= Christelle Luisier =

Swiss politician (born 1974)

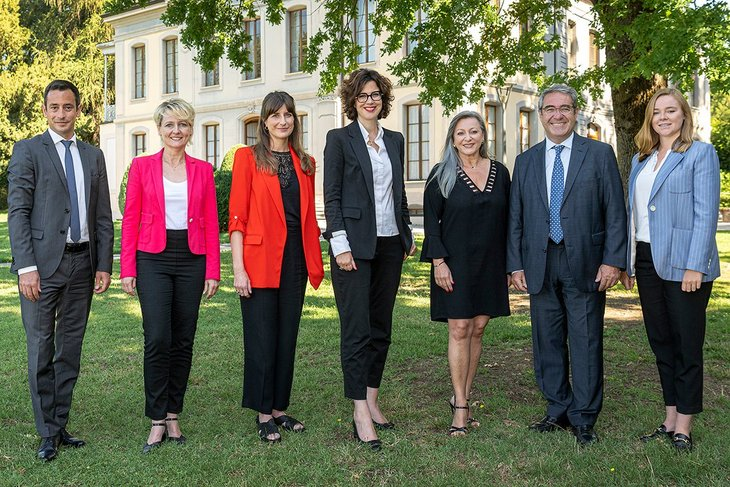
- Luisier (centre) in 2022

President of the Council of State of Vaud
- Incumbent
- Assumed office 1 July 2022
- Preceded by: Nuria Gorrite

Member of the Council of State of Vaud
- Incumbent
- Assumed office 18 March 2020
- Preceded by: Jacqueline de Quattro

Member of the Grand Council of Vaud
- In office April 2012 – February 2020

Member of the Syndicate of Payerne
- In office July 2011 – February 2020

Personal details
- Born: 27 September 1974 (age 51) Sion, Valais, Switzerland
- Party: FDP.The Liberals
- Spouse: Laurent Brodard (divorced)
- Domestic partner: Étienne Blanc (2023–present)
- Children: 2
- Education: University of Fribourg; University of Augsburg
- Occupation: Politician, lawyer

Christelle Luisier (born 27 September 1974) is a Swiss politician and lawyer. Since 2022, she has served as President of the Council of State of Vaud.

== Early life and education ==
Luisier was born on 27 September 1974 in Sion. She spent her childhood in Martigny.

In 1983, her family moved to Payerne, where her parents ran the Café de la Poste. They lived in an apartment above the restaurant. She studied Latin and English at school in Yverdon-les-Bains, where she was a classmate of Cesla Amarelle.

Luisier graduated from the University of Fribourg with a law degree in 1997. She earned a master's degree in media law from the University of Augsburg.

== Career ==
=== Law ===
Luisier worked as a lawyer at the Institute Du Fédéralisme in Fribourg from 1999 to 2002. Then she interned in Lausanne and obtained her barrister's license in 2005. Under the direction of Pascal Broulis, she served as the Deputy General Secretary of the Finance Department of the Canton of Vaud from 2006 to 2008. She served as the Deputy General Secretary of Veteran Affairs from 2008 to 2011.

=== Politics ===
Luisier joined FDP.The Liberals in 1997. She was elected to the Payerne municipal council in 2009, and joined the Syndicate in 2011. She was responsible for infrastructure, vineyards, and tourism.

In 2012, she was elected to the Grand Council of Vaud.

In 2019, she ran to succeed Jacqueline de Quattro's seat in the Council of State of Vaud. On 9 February 2020 she was elected to the council and officially took office on 18 March 2020. In July 2022, she succeeded Nuria Gorrite as the President of the Council of State.

=== Political positioning ===
Christelle Luisier declares that she "embodies the Vaudois centre-right" and does not place herself "at either end of the PLR, neither right nor left." Until her election to the Council of State, her preferred themes were spatial planning, health, the environment, education, and childcare.

== Personal life ==
Luisier married Laurent Brodard in 2003 and later divorced. She and Broddard have two children. Since 2023, she has been in a relationship with fellow politician Étienne Blanc.
