= Claude Ruey =

Swiss politician (born 1949)

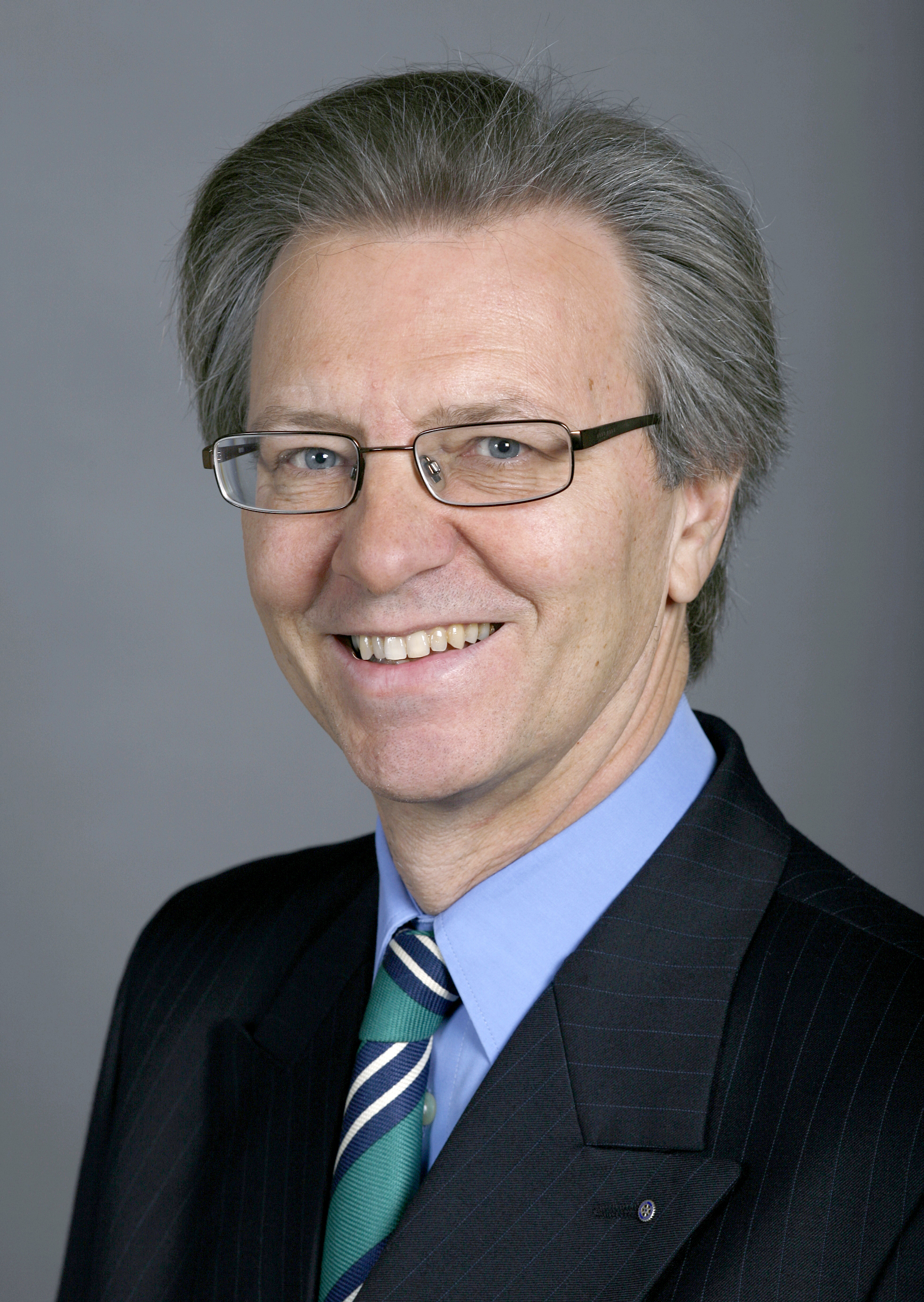

President of the Liberal Party of Switzerland
- In office 8 June 2002 – 15 March 2008
- Preceded by: Jacques-Simon Eggly
- Succeeded by: Pierre Weiss

Member of the National Council
- In office 6 December 1999 – 4 December 2011

Member of the Council of State of Vaud
- In office 1 July 1990 – 30 June 2002

Member of the Grand Council of Vaud
- In office April 1974 – June 1990

Personal details
- Born: 29 November 1949 (age 75); Nyon, Switzerland
- Political party: Liberal Party of Switzerland; FDP.The Liberals

Claude Ruey (born 29 November 1949) is a Swiss politician. He was a member of the National Council from 1999 to 2011. From 2002 to 2008, he was the president of the Liberal Party of Switzerland. During his presidency, the Liberal Party moved towards its merger with the Free Democratic Party to form FDP.The Liberals.

== Biography ==
Ruey was born in Nyon and grew up in the municipality of Gland in the Canton of Vaud. He studied political science and law at the University of Lausanne. In 1973, at the age of 24, he was elected to the municipal council of Nyon. In 1974, he joined the Grand Council of Vaud. where he served until 1990. In 1990, he became a member of the Council of State of Vaud. He was elected to the National Council in the 1999 Swiss federal election. He was a member of the Foreign Policy Committee during his first term.

In 2002, Jacques-Simon Eggly stepped down as the president of the Liberal Party. Ruey ran for the presidency unopposed and was elected to the post in June 2008. He took over a party that had lost seats in prior elections and lost its seat on the Federal Council.

In the 2003 elections the Liberals ran on a joint slate with the Free Democratic Party after losing a number of seats in prior elections. Following the election, losses by both parties pushed Ruey and FDP President Christiane Langenberger to pursue closer cooperation between the two parties. Ruey pushed to continue the cooperation of the parties and they formed a common parliamentary group in 2005. As late as January 2007, Ruey avoided pushing for a formal merger; however, the loss of additional seats in the 2007 Swiss federal election led Ruey to propose a formal merger.

In 2008, Ruey resigned as the party leader in order to become the president of EPER/HEKS, the aid society of the Swiss Protestant church. He was succeeded by Pierre Weiss in April 2008. In 2011, he stood down from parliament.

In addition to his political career, he has served as the president of the foundation of Chillon Castle and president of the Visions du Réel film festival.
