= Jacqueline de Quattro =

Swiss politician

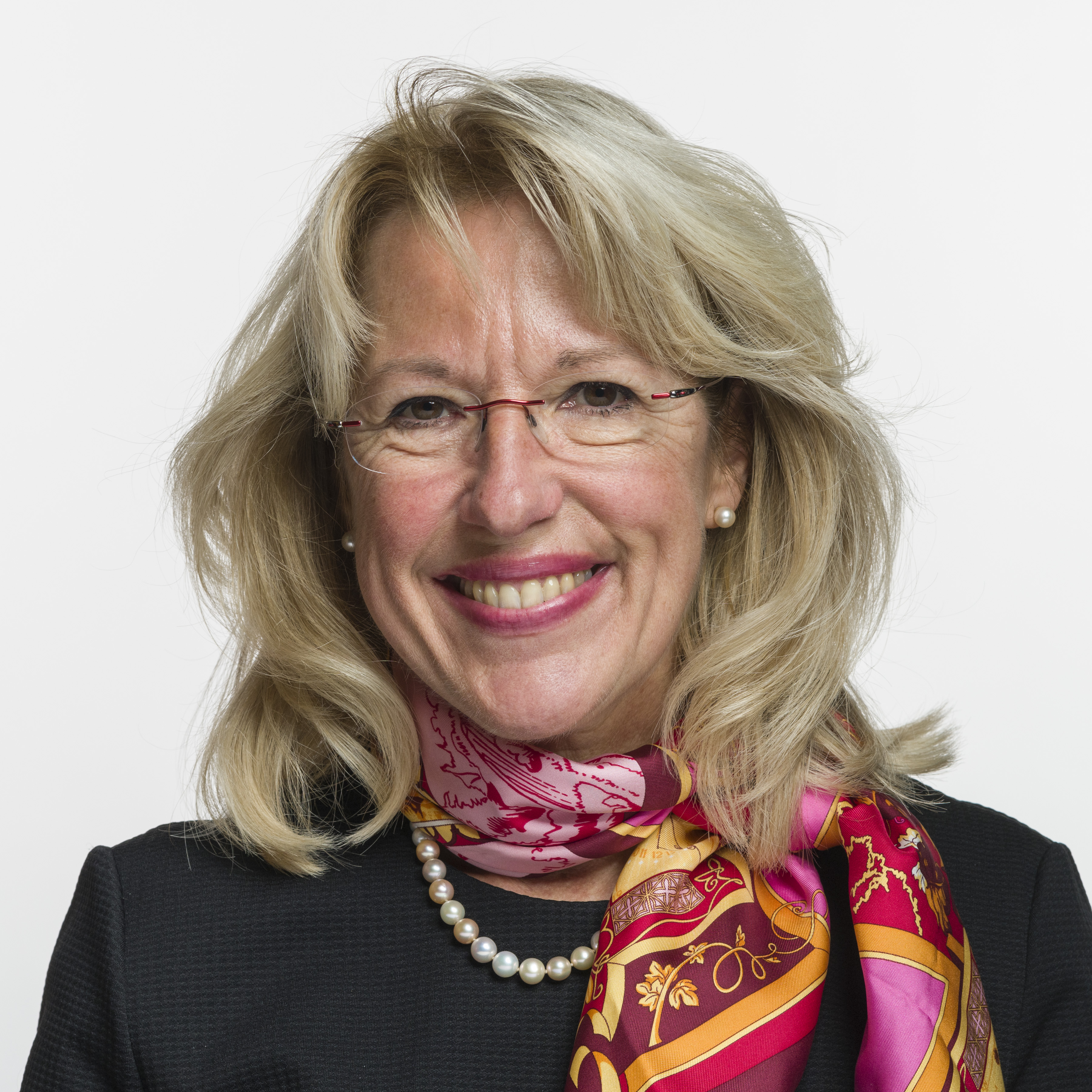
- De Quattro in 2019

Member of the National Council of Switzerland
- Incumbent
- Assumed office 2 December 2019

Member of the Council of State of Vaud
- In office 1 April 2007 – 30 November 2019
- Preceded by: Charles-Louis Rochat
- Succeeded by: Christelle Luisier

Personal details
- Born: 28 June 1960 (age 66) Zürich, Switzerland
- Party: Free Democratic Party (until 2009); FDP.The Liberals (2009-present)
- Children: 2
- Education: University of Lausanne
- Occupation: politician, lawyer

Jacqueline Denise de Quattro (born 28 June 1960) is a Swiss-Italian politician, lawyer, and former judoka. As a member of the FDP.The Liberals, she was elected to the Council of State of Vaud in 2007. In 2019, she was elected to a seat in the National Council of Switzerland.

== Early life and education ==
De Quattro was born on 28 June 1960 in Zürich. She was educated in schools in Zürich until her family moved to Pully in 1971. She graduated from Le Gymnase de La Cité in Lausanne in 1979. In 1983, she graduated from the University of Lausanne with a law degree.

== Career ==
=== Martial arts ===
Passionate about martial arts, de Quattro is a former judo champion. She coached Swiss judoka Sergei Aschwanden. On 10 June 2020, she was elected to the committee of the Swiss Federation of Judo and Jujitsu.

=== Law ===
De Quattro was an assistant at the University of Lausanne Corporate Law Center from 1986 to 1987. In 1987, she was hired as a court clerk at the juvenile court and later at the cantonal court.

In 1992, after moving to La Tour-de-Peilz with her family, de Quattro was employed by the library of the Federal Supreme Court of Switzerland. In 1993, she was appointed as clerk at the Federal Court in the first and second courts of public law.

De Quattro obtained her lawyer's license in 2000 and founded a law firm with three partners.

=== Politics ===
In 2005, de Quattro was appointed by Fulvio Pelli to rebuild the Free Democratic Party of Switzerland's strategy. She was elected as president of the party's women's commission in 2008, serving until 2010. In 2009, the party merged with the Liberal Party of Switzerland to become FDP.The Liberals.

De Quattro was elected to the municipal council of La Tour-de-Peilz in 2006, and headed the Security and Culture dicastery.

In 2007, she was elected to the Council of State of Vaud and was appointed the head of the Department of Security and Environment. In 2014, she headed the Department of Territory and Environment. In 2018, her department organized the first Climate Conference of Vaud.

She resigned from the council in 2019 to run for a seat in the National Council during the 2019 Swiss federal election. De Quattro won her election and officially took office on 2 December 2019. She is a member of the councils' Security Policy Commission. She was considered as a candidate for her party to succeed Olivier Français in the Swiss Council of States in 2022, but the party chose Pascal Broulis.

== Personal life ==
De Quatrro is a dual citizen of Switzerland and Italy. She speaks German, Italian, and French. She is divorced and has two daughters. She lives in Clarens.
