= Christophe Champod =

Swiss forensic scientist and rector-designate of the University of Lausanne

- Born: 1968 (age 57–58); Yverdon-les-Bains, Vaud, Switzerland
- Education: University of Lausanne (MSc, PhD)
- Known for: Forensic identification; fingerprints and trace evidence
- Scientific career
- Fields: Forensic science
- Workplaces: University of Lausanne

Christophe Champod (born 1968) is a Swiss forensic scientist and academic at the University of Lausanne (UNIL). He is widely recognised as a leading expert on trace and fingerprint evidence and has received several of the field’s top distinctions. Born in Yverdon-les-Bains in the Canton of Vaud, he grew up in neighbouring Neuchâtel.

In June 2025, UNIL’s Council selected Champod as the institution’s next rector (the university’s head/president), an appointment that was confirmed by the Vaud Council of State on 9 October 2025; his term is scheduled to begin on 1 August 2026.

== Early life and education ==
Champod was born in Yverdon-les-Bains in 1968 and grew up in the canton of Neuchâtel. He earned a diploma (MSc equivalent) in forensic science and criminology from the University of Lausanne in 1990 and a PhD (summa cum laude) in 1995, both in forensic science.

== Career ==
From 1999 to 2003, Champod led the Interpretation Research Group at the UK Forensic Science Service before returning to UNIL, where he was appointed full professor in 2003. His research focuses on the inferential aspects of forensic identification and the evaluation of evidence, notably fingerprints and footwear marks, and he continues to serve as an expert witness in Switzerland and abroad. In 2021 he became Director of UNIL’s École des sciences criminelles (School of Criminal Justice).

== UNIL rector selection ==
On 27 June 2025, UNIL’s Council proposed Champod to succeed Frédéric Herman as rector from 1 August 2026. The proposal was officially confirmed by the Vaud Council of State on 9 October 2025.

== Honours ==
Henry Medal (2017), The Fingerprint Society (UK).

Douglas M. Lucas Medal (2020), American Academy of Forensic Sciences (Forensic Science Foundation).

== Selected works ==
Champod, Christophe; Lennard, Chris J.; Margot, Pierre; Stoilovic, Milutin, eds. (2017). Fingerprints and Other Ridge Skin Impressions (2nd ed.). Boca Raton: CRC Press. ISBN 978-1-4987-2895-9.

Traces et empreintes digitales : traité de dactyloscopie (in French). Lausanne: Presses polytechniques et universitaires romandes (PPUR). 2017. ISBN 978-2889151837.

== See also ==
Forensic science

University of Lausanne
