= Rebecca Ruiz =

Swiss politician

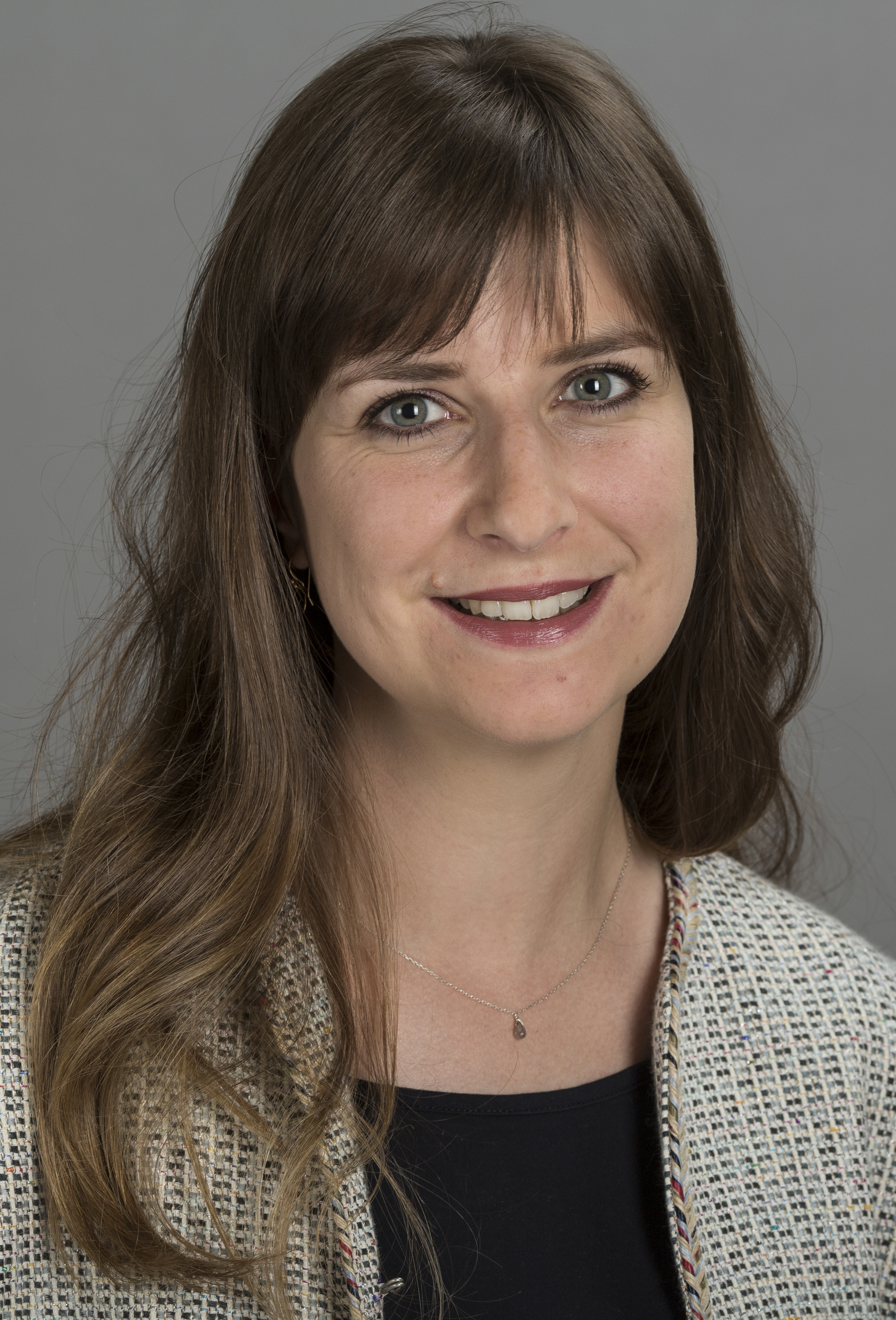

Member of the Council of State of Vaud
- Incumbent
- Assumed office 7 May 2019
- Preceded by: Pierre-Yves Maillard

Member of the National Council
- In office 2 June 2014 – 7 May 2019
- Preceded by: Josiane Aubert
- Succeeded by: Nicolas Rochat Fernandez
- Constituency: Vaud

Personal details
- Born: Rebecca Ana Ruiz; 4 February 1982 (age 44) Lausanne, Switzerland
- Party: Social Democratic Party
- Spouse: Benoît Gaillard

Rebecca Ana Ruiz (born 4 February 1982) is a Swiss politician of the Social Democratic Party (SP). Since 2019, she has been a member of the Council of State in the canton of Vaud where she heads the cantonal department of health and social action. She also represented Vaud in the National Council from June 2014 to May 2019.

== Biography ==
Ruiz comes from a politically active family, her parents who immigrated from Spain were members of the Spanish Socialist Workers' Party, and a grandmother who spent five years in a Francoist prison. She is a dual Spanish-Swiss citizen, studied social sciences and obtained the Master of Laws in criminal law.

== Political career ==
Ruiz is an incumbent State Councilor for the canton of Vaud. She was elected on 19 March 2019 and took office on 7 May. She had previously been a member of the National Council since 2 June 2014.

From July 2006 to June 2012, she was a member of the municipal council (conseil communal) of Lausanne. She then served on the Grand Council of Vaud from July 2012 to May 2014. From March 2008 to April 2013, she was President of the SP in Lausanne and from June 2012 to May 2014 Vice President of the SP parliamentary group in the Grand Council.

== Personal life ==
Ruiz is married to Lausanne councilor Benoît Gaillard and has two children.
