= Nuria Gorrite =

Swiss politician (born 1970)

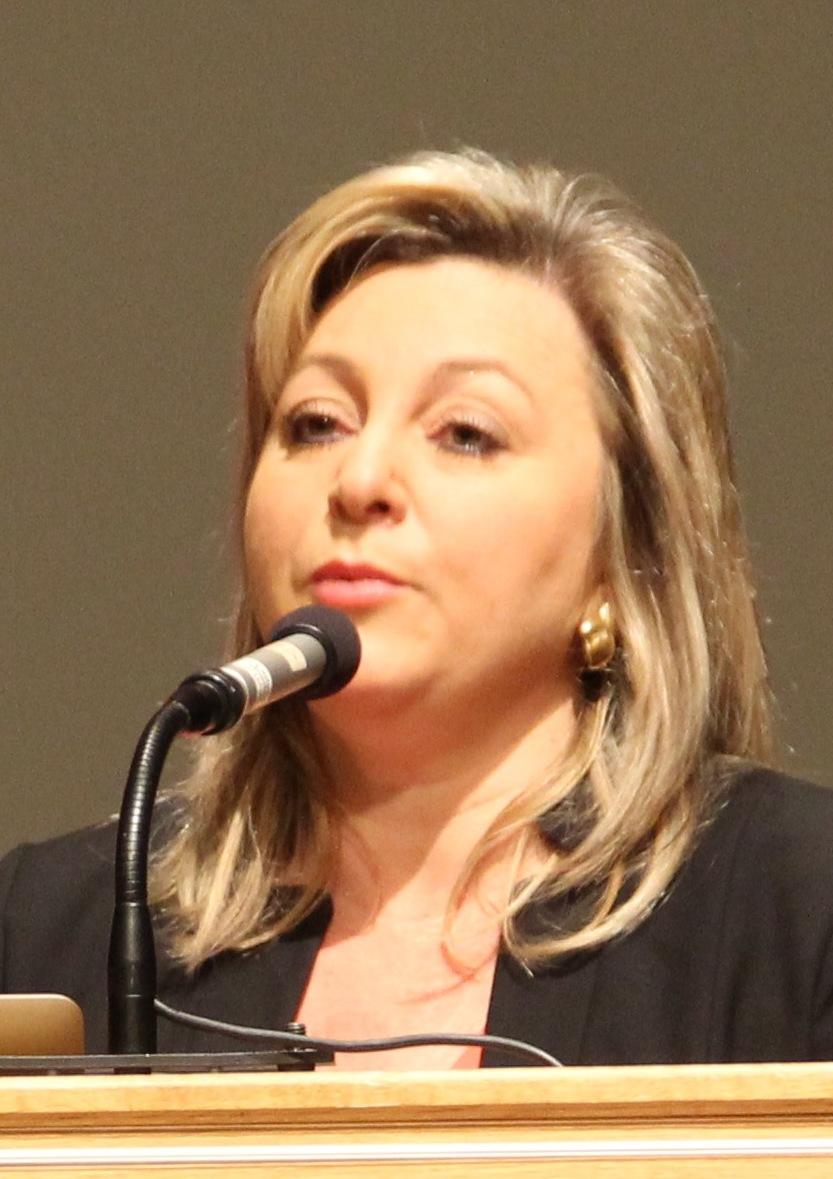
- Gorrite in 2016

Member of the Council of State of Vaud
- Incumbent
- Assumed office 1 July 2012

President of the Council of State of Vaud
- In office 1 July 2017 – 30 June 2022
- Preceded by: Pierre-Yves Maillard
- Succeeded by: Christelle Luisier

Mayor of Morges
- In office April 2008 – June 2012
- Preceded by: Éric Voruz
- Succeeded by: Vincent Jacques

Member of the Grand Council of Vaud
- In office April 2007 – June 2012

Personal details
- Born: 6 July 1970 (age 55) La Chaux-de-Fonds, Neuchâtel, Switzerland
- Party: Social Democrat
- Domestic partner: Olivier Feller
- Children: 1
- Education: University of Lausanne
- Occupation: politician, museum curator

Nuria Gorrite (born 6 July 1970) is a Swiss-Spanish politician and museum curator. A member of the Social Democratic Party of Switzerland, she was the first woman to be elected President of the Council of State of Vaud.

== Early life and education ==
Gorrite was born on 6 July 1970 in La Chaux-de-Fonds to Spanish Basque-Catalan parents who worked as trade unionists. In 1975, her family moved to Morges. Gorrite became a naturalized citizen of Switzerland when she was nineteen.

She studied art history, French, and Spanish at the University of Lausanne from 1992 to 1996.

== Career ==
After finishing her studies, Gorrite was employed as curator of the Musée Alexis Forel in Morges.

In 1987, she became involved with Amnesty International.

=== Politics ===
Gorrite joined the Social Democratic Party of Switzerland in 1993 and was elected to her municipal council that same year.

In 2007, she was elected to sit in the Grand Council of Vaud. In 2008, she was elected as mayor of Morges, succeeding Éric Voruz. She served in both of these capacities until 2012.

On 1 April 2012, Gorrite was elected to the Council of State of Vaud, where she chaired the departments of infrastructure and human resources. She was re-elected in 2017 and was appointed president of the council, succeeding Pierre-Yves Maillard as the first woman president. She was sworn into office without the use of religious text. She served as president until 2022, when she was succeeded by Christelle Luisier.

On 28 September 2023, she announced that she was diagnosed with cancer and was taking a hiatus from her political office in order to receive treatment, with plans to return in 2024.

== Personal life ==
Gorrite is a dual citizen of Spain and Switzerland.

Gorrite is in a relationship with national councillor Olivier Feller, with whom she has a daughter.

She said in 2024 that she has breast cancer.
