= Pierre-Yves Maillard =

Swiss politician

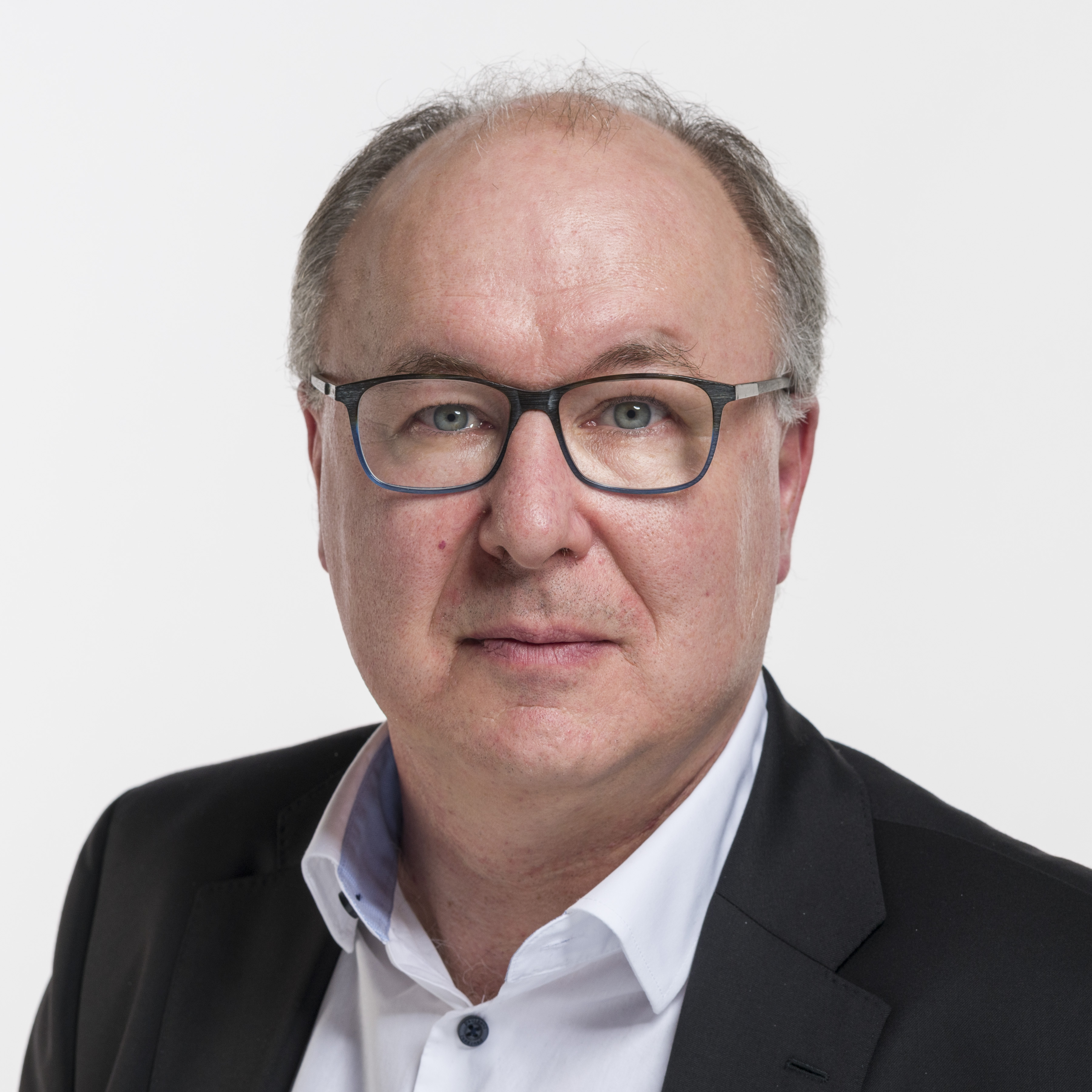
Pierre-Yves Maillard (2019)

Pierre-Yves Maillard (born 16 March 1968) is a Swiss politician of the Social Democratic Party. He was successively a deputy for the canton of Vaud on the National Council (from the end of 1999 to the end of 2004), a member of the Council of State of Vaud at the head of the department of health and social action (from the end of 2004 to May 2019), again national advisor (from the end of 2019 to the end of 2023) and advisor to the states since the end of 2023.

== Life ==
Born in Lausanne, he studied literature at the University of Lausanne and was president of the Swiss Students' Association. He taught French, history and geography in the secondary schools of Préverenges and Lausanne, and was also from 2000 to 2004 the regional secretary of the trade union FTMH Vaud Fribourg.

=== Politics ===
In politics, he served in the municipal parliament of Lausanne from 1990 to 1998, in the Grand Council of Vaud from 1998 to 2000 and in the National Council from 1999 to 2004. There, he was a member of the committees responsible for the environment, for land use planning and energy, and for finance.

Since 1 December 2004, he is a member of the Council of State of Vaud and head of the Department of Health and Social Services. In March 2011, he became the first Socialist politician in the history of the canton of Vaud to be elected in the first round of a popular election, with 54% of votes cast. From March 2004 to 2008, he was also vice president of the Social Democratic Party of Switzerland.

On 26 October 2011, he announced his candidacy to succeed Federal Councillor Micheline Calmy-Rey. On 25 November 2011, the parliamentary group of his party chose him, together with Alain Berset, as one of the party's candidates for the election of 14 December 2011.

According to him, some of the great challenges for the future are ageing of the population, delay in investment in infrastructures and transition to other sources of energy.
