= 2011 Swiss Federal Council election =

Election for the Swiss Federal Council

An election for all seven members of the Federal Council, the government of Switzerland, was held on 14 December 2011, following the federal election on 23 October 2011. Micheline Calmy-Rey announced she would not run for re-election to the council. According to a traditional informal convention, the successor has to come from the French-speaking or Italian-speaking part of Switzerland. The candidates for her post announced by their respective cantonal sections are Alain Berset (Fribourg), Pierre-Yves Maillard (Vaud), Stéphane Rossini (Valais), and Marina Carobbio (Ticino).

Berset and Maillard were favourites. Jean Studer, Liliane Maury Pasquier and Elisabeth Baume-Schneider declined to stand in the election. In the end, the SP decided to nominate Berset and Maillard.

Apart from Calmy-Rey's successor, the controversial aspects of the election included, whether the SVP would hold their seat or gain another, which they had lost after one of their incumbents defected to the BDP; and whether the CVP or the FDP would gain the second seat held by the FDP, which both lay claim to.

The SVP's possible candidates are Heinz Tännler (Zug), Bruno Zuppiger (Zürich), Jakob Stark (Thurgau), Guy Parmelin (Vaud) and Hannes Germann (Schaffhausen). Jean-François Rime (Fribourg) was unofficially nominated, as well. Rime and Zuppiger were nominated as the SVP's candidates; after a scandal involving Zuppiger's professional activities emerged very shortly after the nomination meeting, Hansjörg Walter (Thurgau) was nominated in his stead.

== Candidates ==
The following candidates participated in the election:

- Incumbents, in descending order of seniority:
  - Doris Leuthard (CVP), from Aargau, head of the Federal Department of Environment, Transport, Energy and Communications,
  - Eveline Widmer-Schlumpf (BDP), from Grisons, head of the Federal Department of Finance,
  - Ueli Maurer (SVP), from Zurich, head of the Federal Department of Defence, Civil Protection and Sports,
  - Didier Burkhalter (FDP), from Neuchâtel, head of the Federal Department of Home Affairs,
  - Simonetta Sommaruga (SPS), from Bern, head of the Federal Department of Justice and Police,
  - Johann Schneider-Ammann (FDP), from Bern, head of the Federal Department of Economic Affairs,

(Micheline Calmy-Rey (SPS), from Geneva, head of the Federal Department of Foreign Affairs decided not to seek re-election)

- Other candidates nominated by their party:
  - Alain Berset (SPS), from Fribourg, a member of the Council of States, was nominated by his party to contest the election of the former Micheline Calmy-Rey's seat.
  - Jean-François Rime (SVP), from Fribourg, a member of the National Council, was nominated by his party to contest the election of Eveline Widmer-Schlumpf's, Simonetta Sommaruga's, Johann Schneider-Ammann's and the former Micheline Calmy-Rey's seats.
  - Hansjörg Walter (SVP), from Thurgau, a member of the National Council, was nominated by his party to contest the election of Eveline Widmer-Schlumpf's seat.
  - Pierre-Yves Maillard (SPS), from Vaud, a member of the Council of State of Vaud, was nominated by his party to contest the election of the former Micheline Calmy-Rey's seat.
- Other candidates receiving at least 10 votes:
  - Luc Recordon (GPS), from Vaud, a member of the Council of States
  - Marina Carobbio (SPS), from Ticino, a member of the National Council

== Results ==
Results:

=== Seat held by Doris Leuthard ===
Doris Leuthard was re-elected during the first ballot. Her re-election was supported by all parliamentary groups.

	Round 1
Doris Leuthard	216
Votes received by other persons	11
Votes cast	245
Invalid votes	1
Blank votes	17
Valid votes	227
Absolute majority	114

=== Seat held by Eveline Widmer-Schlumpf ===
Eveline Widmer-Schlumpf was re-elected during the first ballot. Her re-election was supported by all parliamentary groups except that of the SVP and part of the FDP.

	Round 1
Eveline Widmer-Schlumpf	131
Hansjörg Walter	63
Jean-François Rime	41
Votes received by other persons	4
Votes cast	245
Invalid votes	1
Blank votes	5
Valid votes	239
Absolute majority	120

=== Seat held by Ueli Maurer ===
Ueli Maurer was re-elected during the first ballot. His re-election was supported by all parliamentary groups except the GPS

	Round 1
Ueli Maurer	159
Hansjörg Walter	41
Luc Recordon	13
Votes received by other persons	13
Votes cast	245
Invalid votes	3
Blank votes	16
Valid votes	226
Absolute majority	114

=== Seat held by Didier Burkhalter ===
Didier Burkhalter was re-elected during the first ballot. His re-election was supported by all parliamentary groups.

	Round 1
Didier Burkhalter	194
Jean-François Rime	24
Votes received by other persons	14
Votes cast	245
Invalid votes	1
Blank votes	12
Valid votes	232
Absolute majority	117

=== Seat held by Simonetta Sommaruga ===
Simonetta Sommaruga was re-elected during the first ballot. Her re-election was supported by all parliamentary groups except that of SVP

	Round 1
Simonetta Sommaruga	179
Jean-François Rime	61
Votes received by other persons	2
Votes cast	245
Invalid votes	0
Blank votes	3
Valid votes	242
Absolute majority	122

=== Seat held by Johann Schneider-Ammann ===
Johann Schneider-Ammann was re-elected during the first ballot. His re-election was supported by all parliamentary groups except that of SVP

	Round 1
Johann Schneider-Ammann	159
Jean-François Rime	64
Votes received by other persons	11
Votes cast	245
Invalid votes	2
Blank votes	9
Valid votes	234
Absolute majority	118

=== Vacant seat ===
A vacant seat was to be filled following the retirement of Micheline Calmy-Rey (SPS).

Alain Berset (SPS) was elected in the second round. His election was supported by all parliamentary groups except the SVP's.

	Round 1	Round 2
Alain Berset	114	126
Pierre-Yves Maillard	59	63
Jean-François Rime	59	54
Marina Carobbio	10	
Votes received by other persons	1	2
Votes cast	243	245
Invalid votes	0	0
Blank votes	0	0
Valid votes	243	245
Absolute majority	122	123
