= Charles-Louis Rochat =

Swiss politician

Member of the Council of State of Vaud
- In office 21 April 1998 – 1 April 2007
- Succeeded by: Jacqueline de Quattro

Personal details
- Born: 20 November 1946 (age 79) Les Charbonnières, Vaud, Switzerland
- Party: FDP.The Liberals
- Occupation: politician

Charles-Louis Rochat (born 20 November 1946) is a Swiss politician. He is a member of the Liberal Party and served in the Conseil d'État of Vaud from 1998 to 2007.

== Biography ==
Rochat was born in Les Charbonnières on 20 November 1946.

As a member of the Liberal Party, he was elected to serve in the Council of State of Vaud in 1998, sitting in office until 2007. In April 1998, he became part of the Department for Health and Social Action. On 30 November 2004, Rochat was appointed chairman of the Department of Security and the Environment. He was succeeded in office by Jacqueline de Quattro.
