= Clarens, Switzerland =

Village in the canton of Vaud, Switzerland

Coordinates: 46.442°N 6.894°E

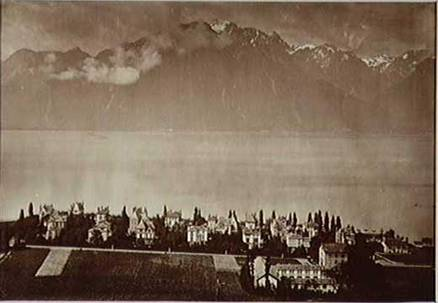
Clarens around 1882

Clarens-Montreux or Clarens is a neighbourhood in the municipality of Montreux, in the canton of Vaud, in Switzerland. This neighbourhood is the biggest and most populated of the city of Montreux.

Clarens was made famous throughout Europe by the immense success of the book La Nouvelle Héloïse by Jean-Jacques Rousseau.

Aerial view (1964)

== Notable people ==
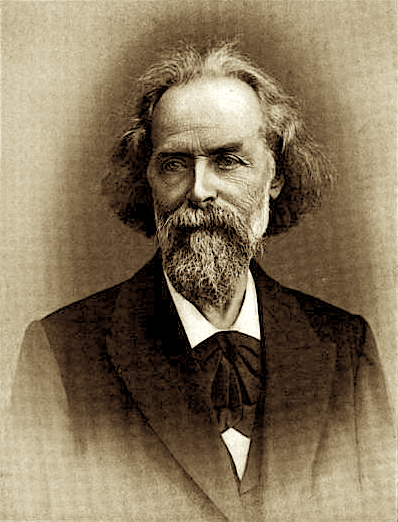
Élisée Reclus, 1905

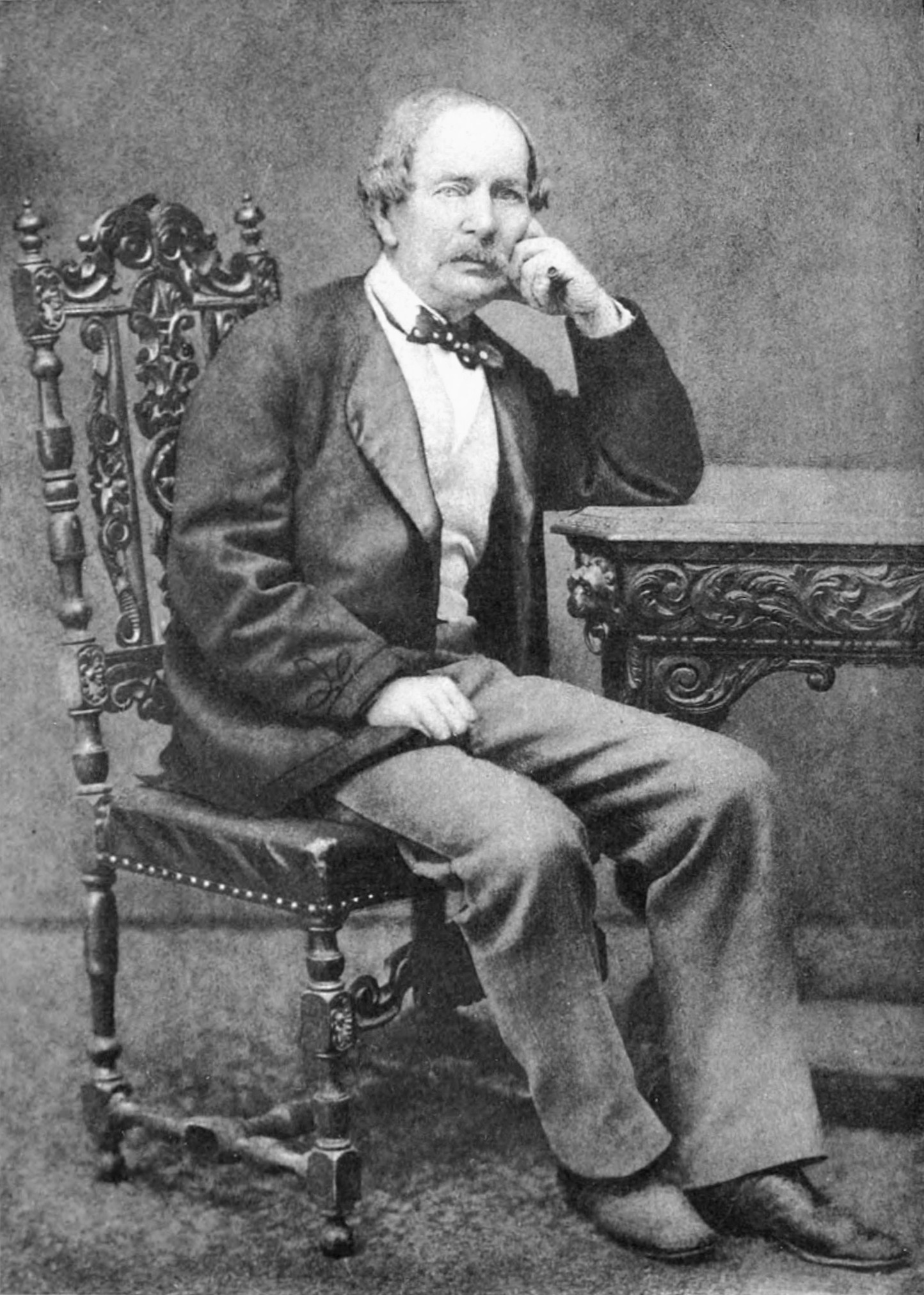
David Urquhart

=== Lived in Clarens ===
- Élisée Reclus (1830–1905), renowned French geographer, writer and anarchist; resided in Clarens from 1872.
- Pyotr Ilyich Tchaikovsky (1840–1893), the Russian composer of the Romantic period, wrote his Violin Concerto in Clarens in 1878; it is one of the best known violin concertos ever written.
- Jens Peter Jacobsen (1847-1885), the Danish writer, resided in Montreux in the winter of 1877-78 and featured the town of Clarens in his novel Niels Lyhne.
- Sholem Aleichem (1859–1916), the Yiddish classic writer, resided in Clarens in 1912.
- Igor Stravinsky (1882–1971), the Russian composer, lived in Clarens during the summers of 1910 to 1915. He composed his ballets The Rite of Spring and Pulcinella here.
- Jacqueline de Quattro (born 1960), a member of the National Council of Switzerland and former member of the Council of State of Vaud.

=== Died in Clarens ===
- David Urquhart (1805–1877), British diplomat, writer and politician, MP for Stafford 1847 to 1852, introduced Turkish baths to Britain; lived in Clarens from 1864 and is buried there.
- Paul Kruger (1825–1904), former President of the Transvaal Republic up to and including the Second Boer War, lived his final year in self-imposed exile in Clarens after escaping from South Africa, and died there. Clarens, Free State, a small town in South Africa, was named in his honour.
- Johannes van Laar (1860–1938), Dutch chemist who is best known for the equations regarding chemical activity (Van Laar equation).

=== Buried in Clarens ===
- Henri-Frédéric Amiel (1821–1881), Swiss poet, diarist, moral philosopher.
- Sydney Chaplin (1885–1965), British actor and the elder half-brother of Sir Charlie Chaplin. He died in Nice and was buried in Clarens.
- Oskar Kokoschka (1886–1980), Austrian artist, poet and playwright of expressionistic portraits and landscapes, lived in Montreux from 1947 to 1980, where he died. He is buried in Clarens.
- Vladimir Nabokov (1899–1977), Russian-born novelist, poet, translator and entomologist; in 1961 he and Véra moved from the United States to Montreux, where he subsequently died. He is buried in Clarens.
- Joan Sutherland (1926–2010), Australian soprano, leading exponent of bel canto.

== Education ==
St George's School in Switzerland, a British international school, is in Clarens.

== Photo gallery ==
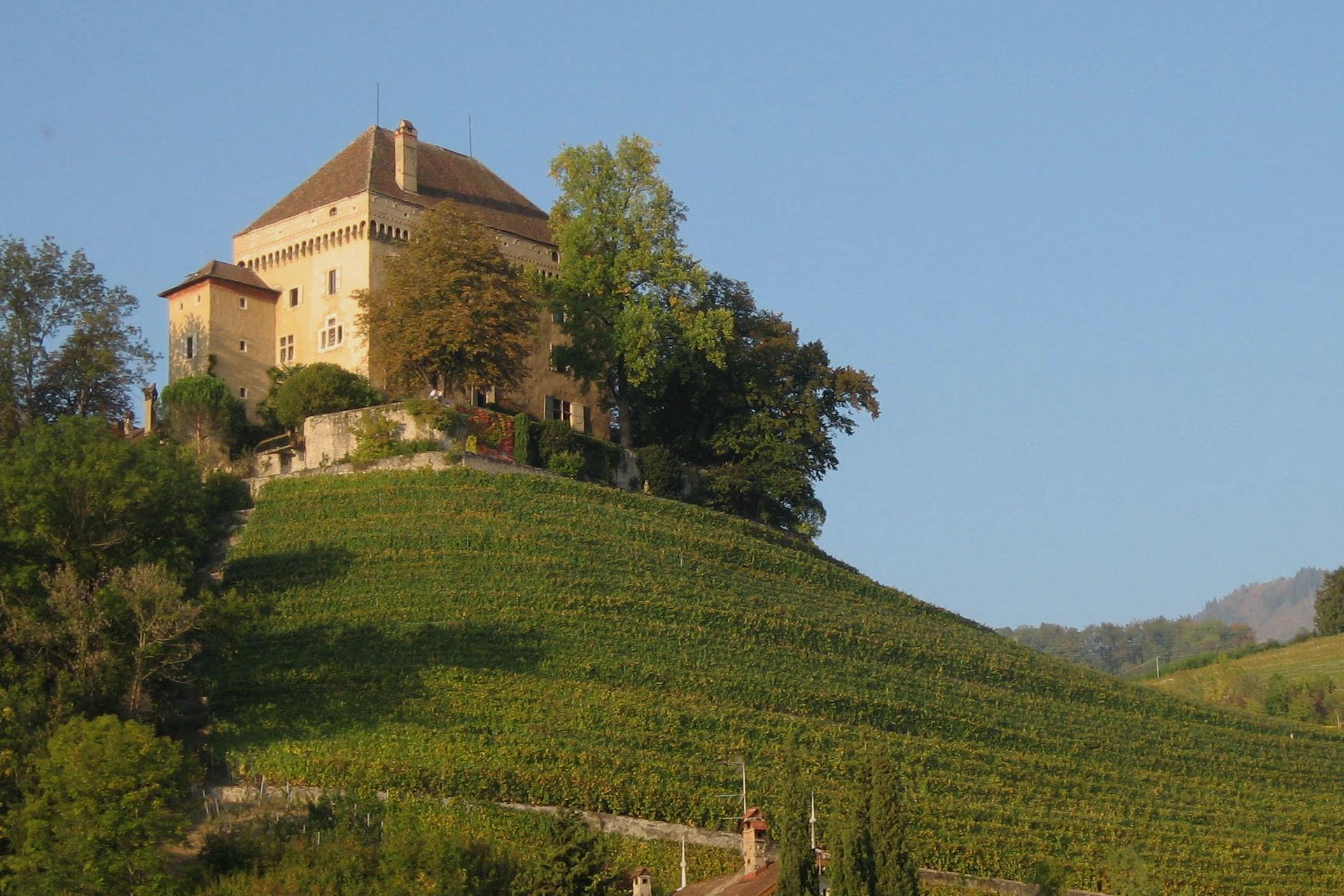
Castel Châtelard near Clarens

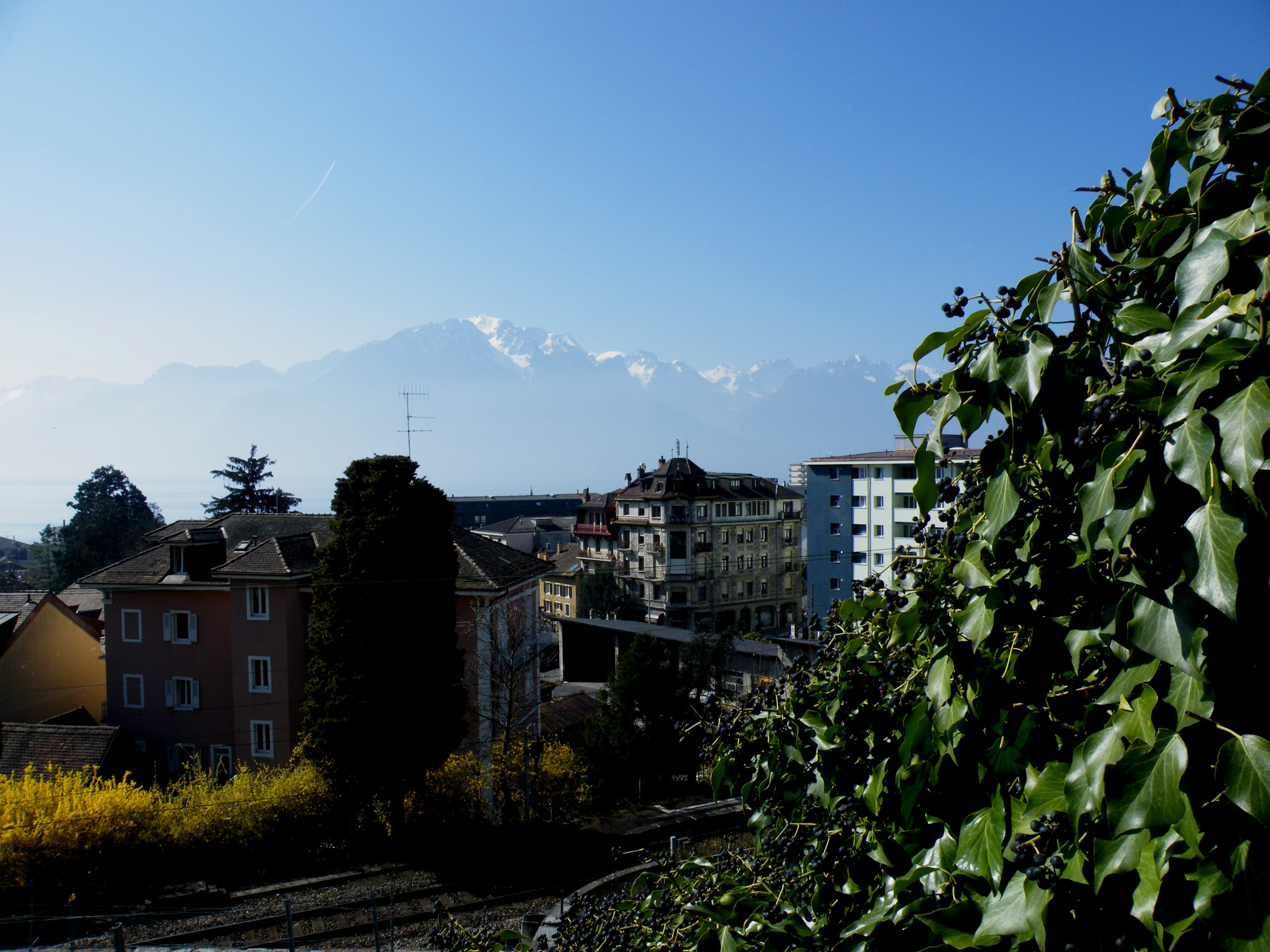
Clarens and mountain view
