= Samuel Bendahan =

Swiss politician (born 1980)

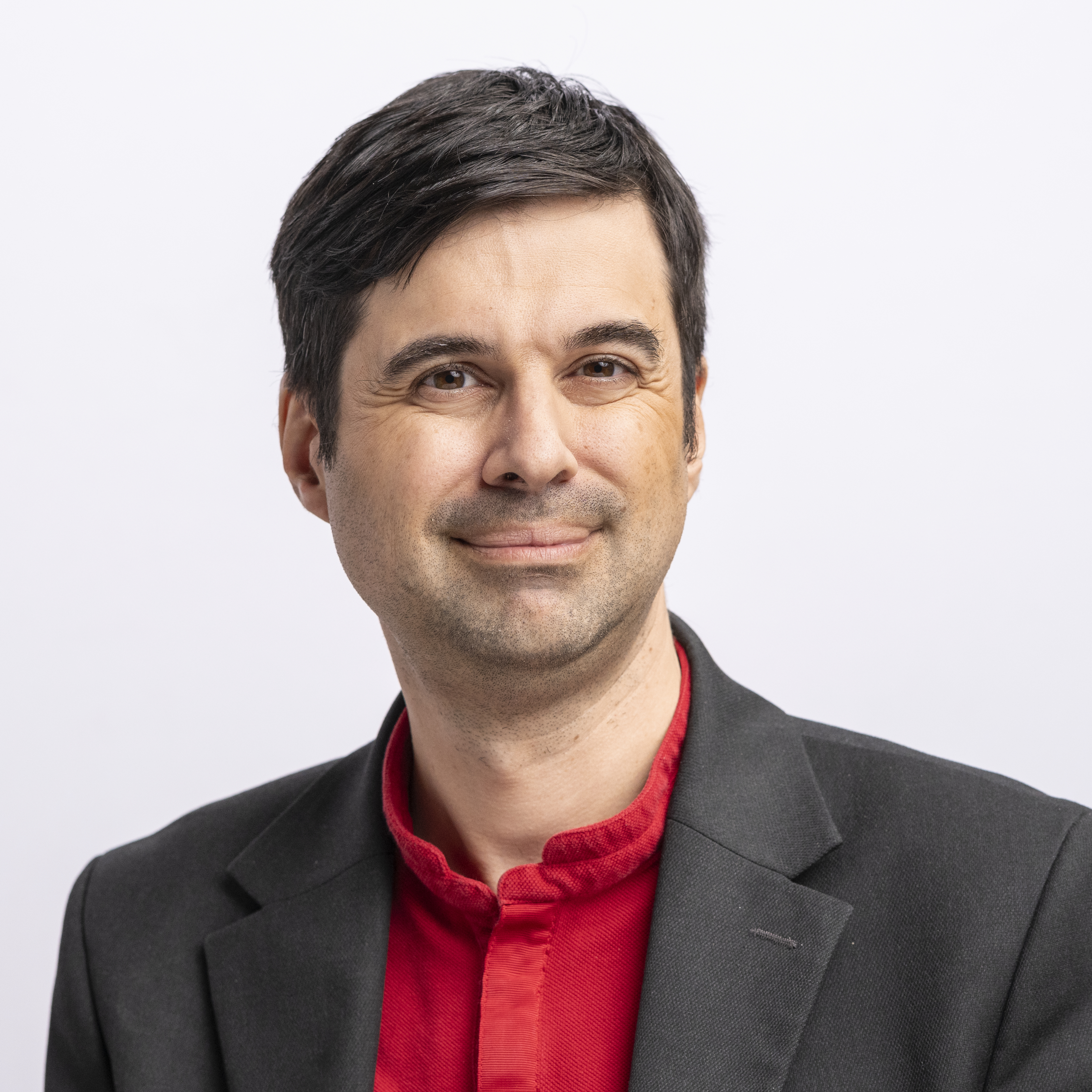
Samuel Bendahan

Samuel Bendahan (born 11 June 1980) is a Swiss Socialist Party politician and member of the National Council elected from Canton of Vaud in 2017. He previously served in Vaudois Grand Council.

== Early life and education ==
Bendahan was born in Lausanne and raised in Morges. His father is a Moroccan and his mother is from Aargau. He was a gymnast in Lausanne during his teen years. He became an actor at the age of 17 and did theatrical improvisation for ten years. He studied for a degree in economics at the University of Lausanne graduating in 1999 and a doctorate degree in Economics Management, Organisational Behaviour in 2009. He started teaching in 2007 and later became a research professor at the International Institute for Management Development (IMD)

== Political career ==
When he decided to join active politics, he studied several political parties to find one that is suitable for his ambition. He then joined Socialist Party and campaigned in markets to meet “real people”. He was elected to the Municipal Council of Lausanne in 2011. He left the council in 2012 following his election to the Grand Council of the Canton of Vaud. He ran for a seat in the National Council in 2015 but was defeated. Bendahan was elected to the National Council in 2017 replacing Cesla Amarelle who was elected to the State Council of the Canton of Vaud. He was re-elected for another term in 2019.
