= Marguerite Narbel =

Swiss biologist and politician (1918–2010)

President of the Grand Council of Vaud
- In office May 1981 – May 1982
- Preceded by: Gilliand Olivier
- Succeeded by: Perey André

Member of the Grand Council of Vaud for Lausanne
- In office 1970–1986

Personal details
- Born: 7 February 1918 Lausanne, Vaud, Switzerland
- Died: 2 June 2010 (aged 92) Lutry, Vaud, Switzerland
- Party: Liberal Party of Switzerland
- Spouse: Jean-René Hofstetter (divorced)
- Education: University of Lausanne

Marguerite Narbel-Hofstetter (7 February 1918 – 2 June 2010) was a Swiss biologist and politician who served on the Grand Council of Vaud from 1970 until 1986. A member of the Liberal Party of Switzerland, Narbel became the first woman to serve as president of the council in 1981.

== Biography ==
Marguerite Narbel was born on 7 February 1918 in the city of Lausanne in Vaud. Her father Jean-Louis, who was the chief physician at a local hospital, died two years after her birth. Narbel attended the University of Lausanne, graduating in 1941 with a degree in natural science. After receiving an exchange fellowship from the American Swiss Foundation the following year, Narbel studied zoology at Columbia University in the United States. In 1946, she received a doctorate in zoology from the University of Lausanne.

Narbel worked as a biologist in Lausanne and Zürich, and she later held research and teaching positions at the University of Lausanne and the University of Geneva. Narbel's research focused on cytogenetics, and her study of the process of meiosis in parthenogenic animals was described as being "a modern classic". From 1956 until 1958, Narbel served as the president of the Vaud Association of University Women, and she was the vice president of the Swiss Association of University Women from 1964 until 1968. The following year, Narbel founded a training school for laboratory assistants in Lausanne. Narbel was elected an honorary member of Pro Natura in 1982.

In 1970, Narbel was elected to the Grand Council of Vaud, representing Lausanne as a member of the Liberal Party of Switzerland. During her tenure, Narbel advocated for feminism and environmentalism, and she served on the Federal Water Protection Commission in 1980. In May 1981, Narbel became the first woman to serve as president of the Grand Council of Vaud, holding the position until the following year. Narbel left the Grand Council in 1986.

At some point, Narbel was married to Jean-René Hofstetter, who was the director of the Lausanne University Hospital, though they had no children and eventually divorced. Narbel died in Lutry on 2 June 2010 at the age of 92. Her funeral was held at the Lausanne Cathedral.
