= Pascal Broulis =

Swiss politician (born 1965)

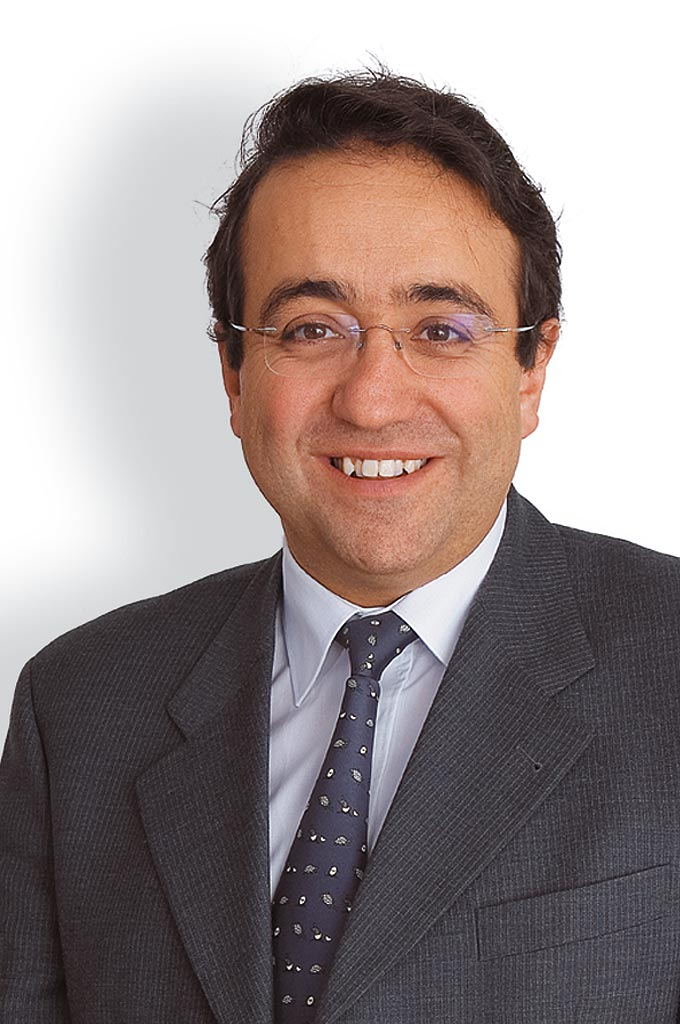
Pascal Broulis

Pascal Broulis (born 3 April 1965 in Sainte-Croix, Vaud) is a Swiss politician. Since 2002, he has been a member of the Council of State in the canton of Vaud. He headed the cantonal finance department, and has been the President of the Council of State from 2007 to 2012. He no longer stood in the 2022 Council of State elections.

Broulis was elected to Vaud's legislature, the Grand Council, in 1990, as a member of the Free Democratic Party.

He was the fourth candidate to the succession of Pascal Couchepin in the Swiss Federal Council.
