= Cesla Amarelle =

Uruguayan-Swiss politician

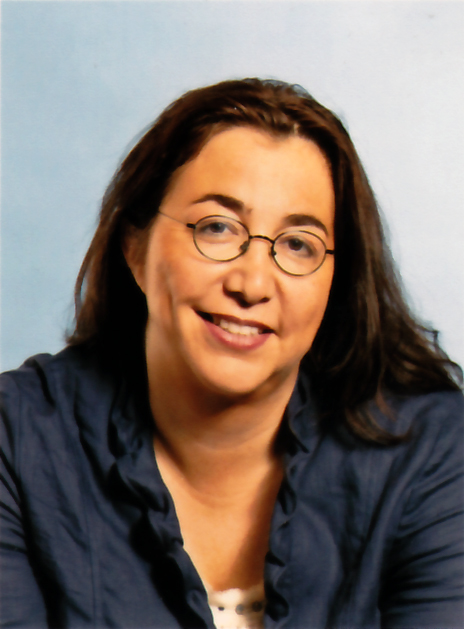
- Amarelle in 2011

Personal details
- Born: 14 September 1973 (age 52) Montevideo
- Citizenship: Uruguay, Switzerland
- Party: Social Democratic Party of Switzerland
- Website: www.cesla-amarelle.ch

Cesla Virginia Amarelle (born 14 September 1973, Montevideo) is an Uruguayan-Swiss jurist and politician. She is a member of the Social Democratic Party of Switzerland and a professor of law at University of Neuchâtel.

== Early life ==
Cesla Amarelle was born on 14 September 1973 in Montevideo, Uruguay, three months after the 1973 Uruguayan coup d'état that brought a military dictatorship to power in the country. Her parents, both leftist activists, decided to flee Uruguay and in 1977, while working for an international organization in Geneva, Switzerland, settled in Yverdon-les-Bains. Amarelle became a naturalized citizen of Switzerland at the age of 16.

== Academic career ==
In 2008–09, Amarelle lectured at University of Fribourg and was its chair for international and European law. She was made an assistant professor on migration law at the University of Neuchâtel the following year. Since January 2016, she has been a professor of public and migration law there.

== Political career ==
Amarelle joined the Social Democratic Party of Switzerland in 1999. She was the vice president of the party's chapter in the Canton of Vaud from 2004 to 2008 and then that chapter's president from 2008 to 2012.

== Personal life ==
Amarelle is married to Philipp Müller.
