= University of Lausanne =

University in Lausanne, Switzerland

- Université de Lausanne
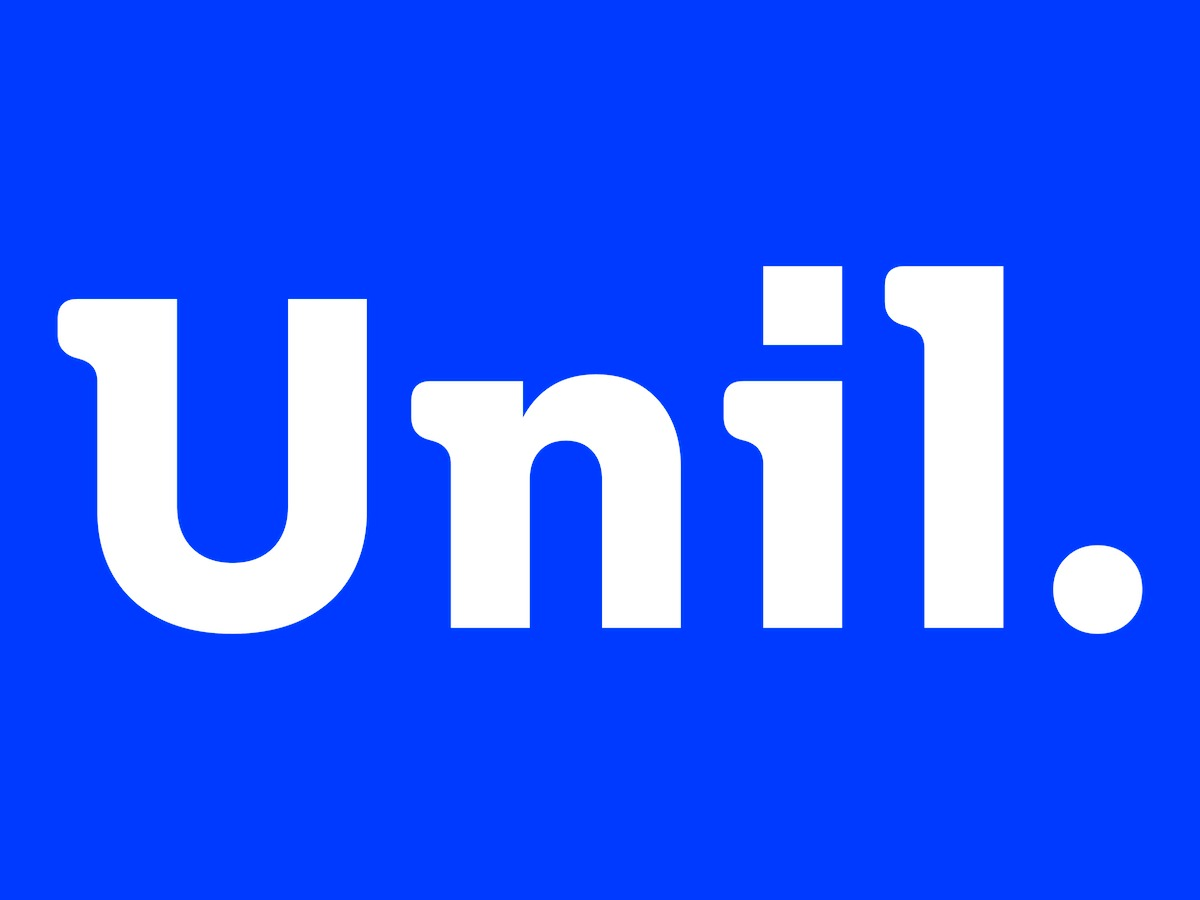
- Latin: Schola Lausannensis
- Motto: Le savoir vivant
- Motto in English: Live knowledge
- Type: Public university
- Established: 1537; 489 years ago
- Affiliations: EUA; AUF; UNICA
- Rector: Frédéric Herman (since August 2021)
- Administrative staff: 3,861 (2023)
- Students: 16,951 (2023)
- Undergraduates: 8,459 (2023)
- Postgraduates: 5,444 (2023)
- Doctoral students: 2,476 (2023)
- Location: Lausanne; Chavannes-près-Renens; Écublens; Saint-Sulpice; Épalinges; 46°31′21″N 6°34′46″E
- Website: www.unil.ch

The University of Lausanne (UNIL; French: Université de Lausanne) in Lausanne, Switzerland, was founded in 1537 as a school of Protestant theology, before being made a university in 1890. The university is the second-oldest in Switzerland, and one of the oldest in the world in continuous operation. As of fall 2017, about 15,000 students and 3,300 employees studied and worked at the university. Approximately 1,500 international students attend the university (120 nationalities), which has a wide curriculum including exchange programs with other universities.

Together with the École polytechnique fédérale de Lausanne (EPFL) the university forms a vast campus at the shores of Lake Geneva.

== History ==
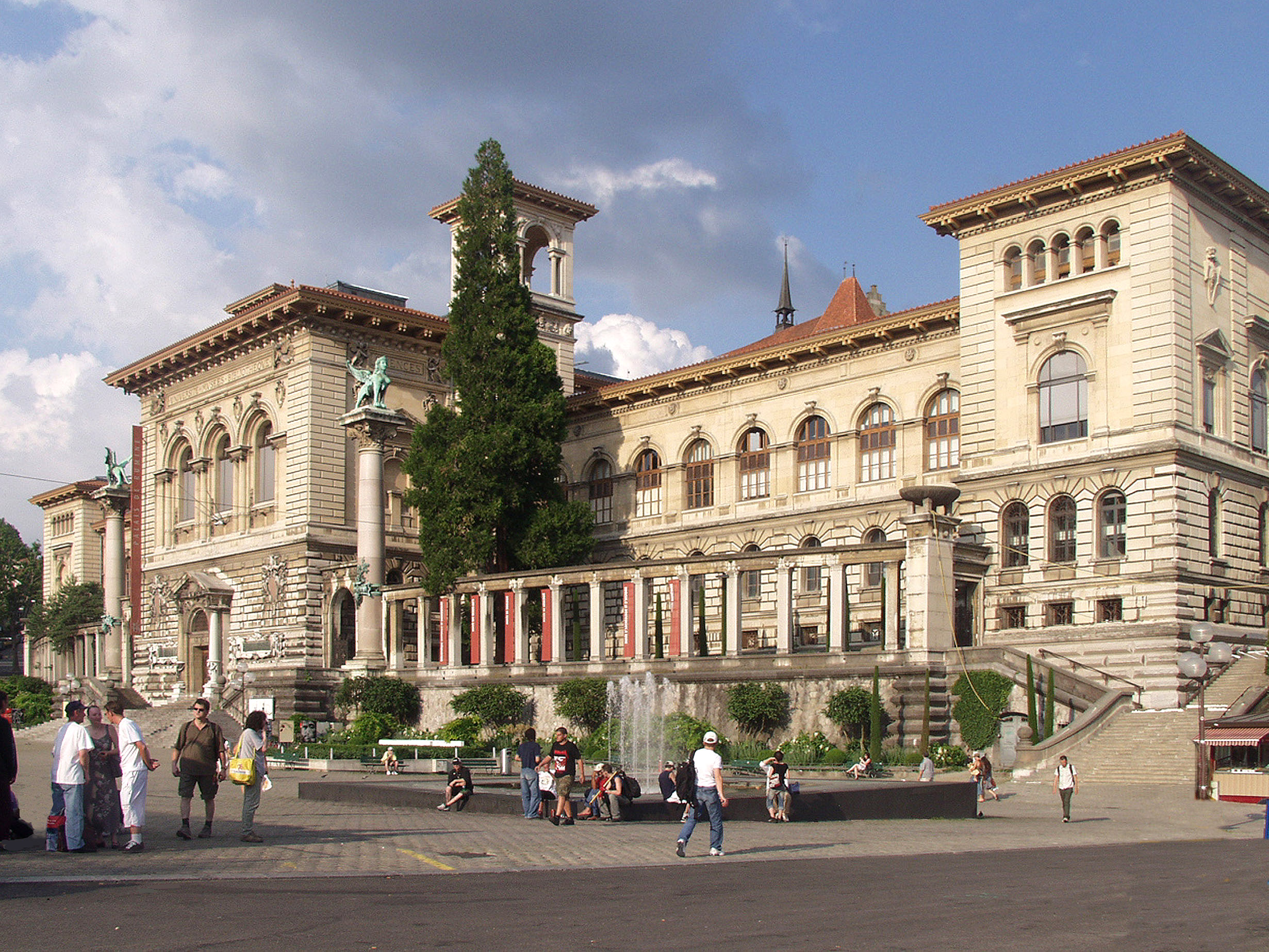
The Palais de Rumine, one of the former buildings of the University of Lausanne

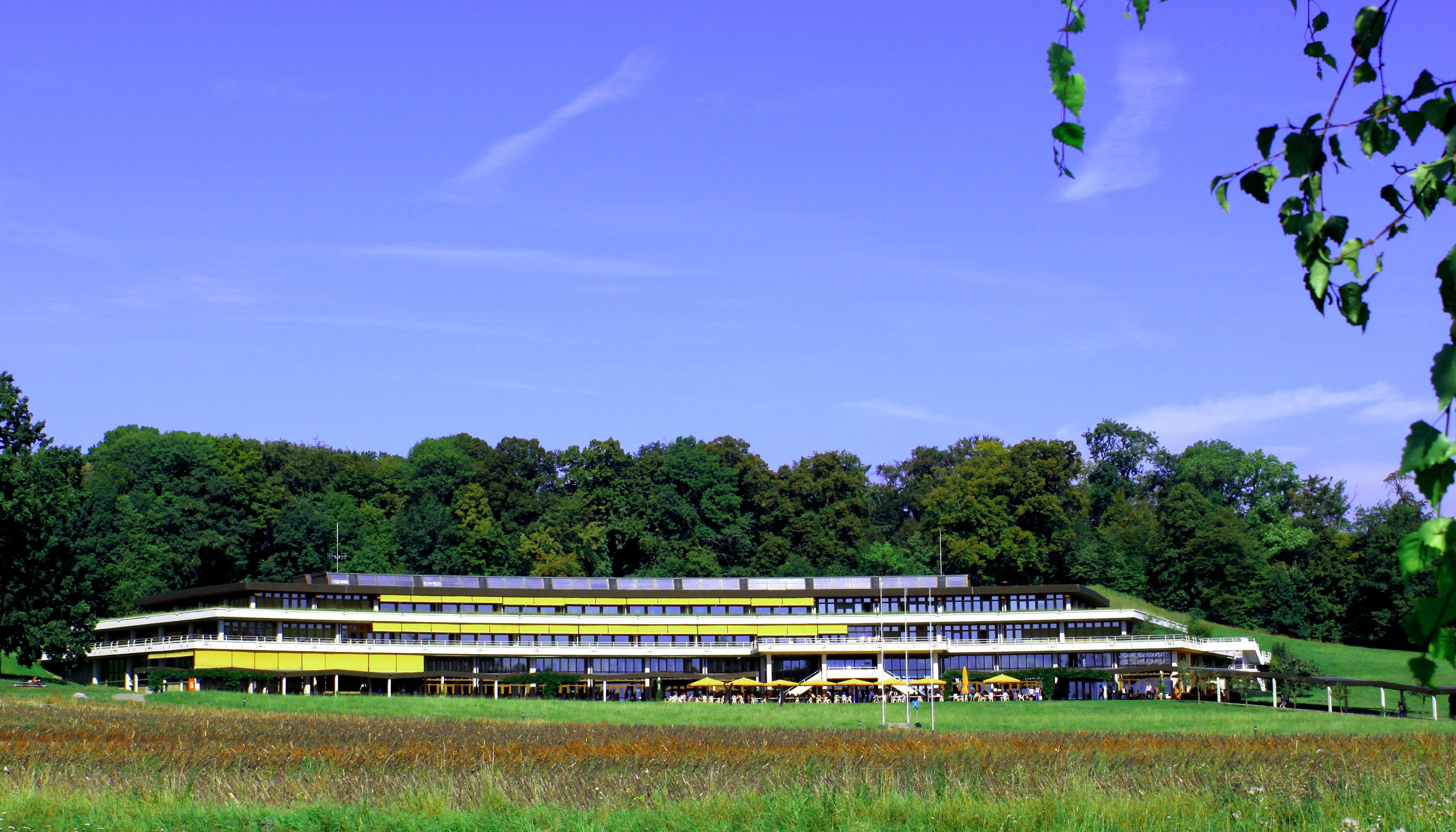
Unithèque building houses one of the two sites of the Cantonal and University Library of Lausanne on the main campus of the UNIL.

The university was founded in 1537 as the Schola Lausannensis, one year after Bern annexed the territory of Barony of Vaud from the Duchy of Savoy, as a school of theology with the purpose of training pastors for the church. It enjoyed great renown in its early years for being the first and, until the establishment of the Academy of Geneva in 1559, the only French-language Protestant school of theology. It quickly became a center of humanist learning, with thinkers such as Corderius and Celio Secondo Curione among its professors. In 1558, the school had 700 students. It entered into a period of decline in the following years, after several members of the academic staff, including rector Theodore Beza and Pierre Viret, resigned their seats to join the newly established Academy of Geneva.

In the seventeenth century, the institution became known as the Academy of Lausanne (Académie de Lausanne). In 1741, it counted 150 students and seven professors. Starting in 1837, the academy was modernized by the authorities of the canton of Vaud, becoming a secular institution divided into three faculties (letters and sciences, theology, and law). It continued to expand throughout the second half of the 19th century, until 1890, with the establishment of a medicine course, the academy received the name and status of a university.

From 1970, the university moved progressively from the old centre of Lausanne, around the Cathedral and Château, to its present site at Dorigny.

The end of the 20th century, witnessed the beginnings of an ambitious project aiming at greater co-operation and development among the French-speaking universities of Lausanne, Geneva, and Neuchâtel, together with the Swiss Federal Institute of Technology in Lausanne (EPFL). Among others, this led to the transfer of the sections of Mathematics, Physics and Chemistry from the university to the EPFL; the funds that were made available following this transfer were invested in the development of the life sciences at the university, including the creation of a Center for Integrative Genomics.

In 2003, two new faculties were founded, concentrating on the life and human sciences: the Faculty of Biology and Medicine and the Faculty of Geosciences and Environment.

== Faculties and schools ==
Location: Lausanne, Switzerland

The University of Lausanne comprises seven faculties:

- Faculty of Arts (Faculté des lettres)
- Faculty of Biology and Medicine (FBM)
- Faculty of Business and Economics (HEC), also called HEC Lausanne
- Faculty of Geosciences and Environment (GSE)
- Faculty of Law, Criminal Justice and Public Administration (FDSC), including the Swiss Graduate School of Public Administration
- Faculty of Social and Political Sciences (SSP)
- Faculty of Theology and Religious Studies (FTSR)

The University of Lausanne also comprises schools and different sections, including but not limited to:

- School of Criminal Justice (ESC)
- School of French as a Foreign Language (EFLE)
- French summer and winter courses (Cours de vacances)
- Science-Society Interface

== Campus ==
=== Main campus ===
The main campus is presently situated outside the city of Lausanne, on the shores of Lake Léman, in Dorigny. It is adjacent to the Swiss Federal Institute of Technology in Lausanne (EPFL) and is served by the Lausanne Metro Line M1. The two schools together welcome about 20,000 students.

The UNIL and the EPFL share an active sports centre located on the campus, on the shores of Lake Geneva and their campus is also equipped with a bicycle sharing system.

The university campus is made up of individual buildings with a park and arboretum in between. The university library also serves as eating hall and is centrally located. The view from the library across the sports fields to the lake of Geneva and the French and Swiss Alps. On a clear day, Mont Blanc can be seen.

The Swiss Institute of Comparative Law and the central administration of the Swiss Institute of Bioinformatics are also located on the main campus.

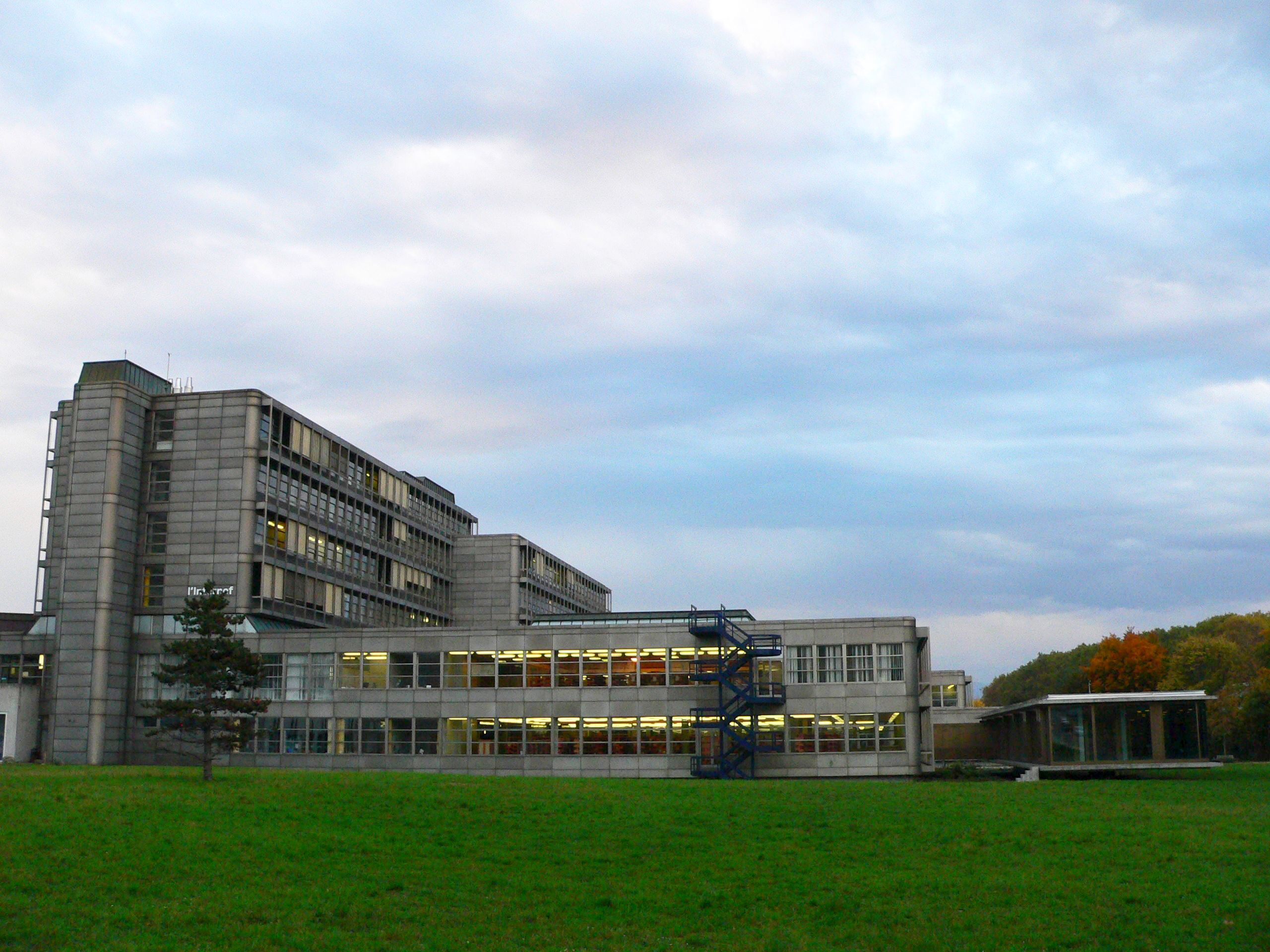
The main building of the Faculty of Law and Criminal Justice and of the Faculty of Business and Economics

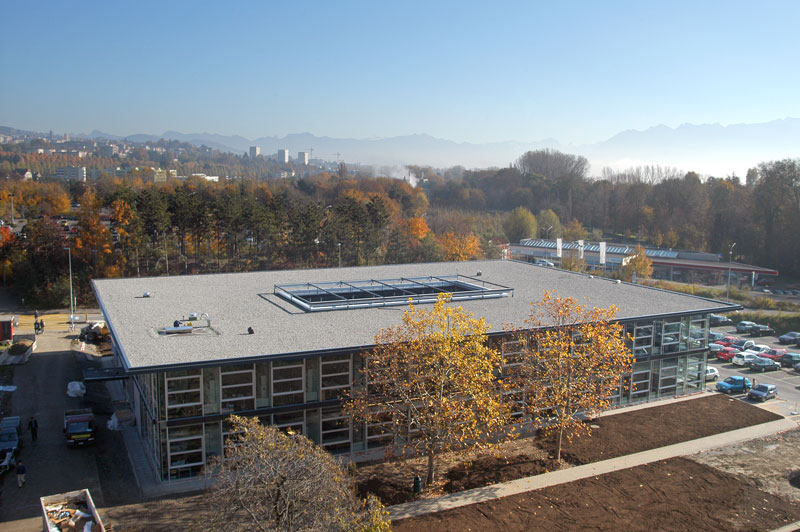
The Extranef building

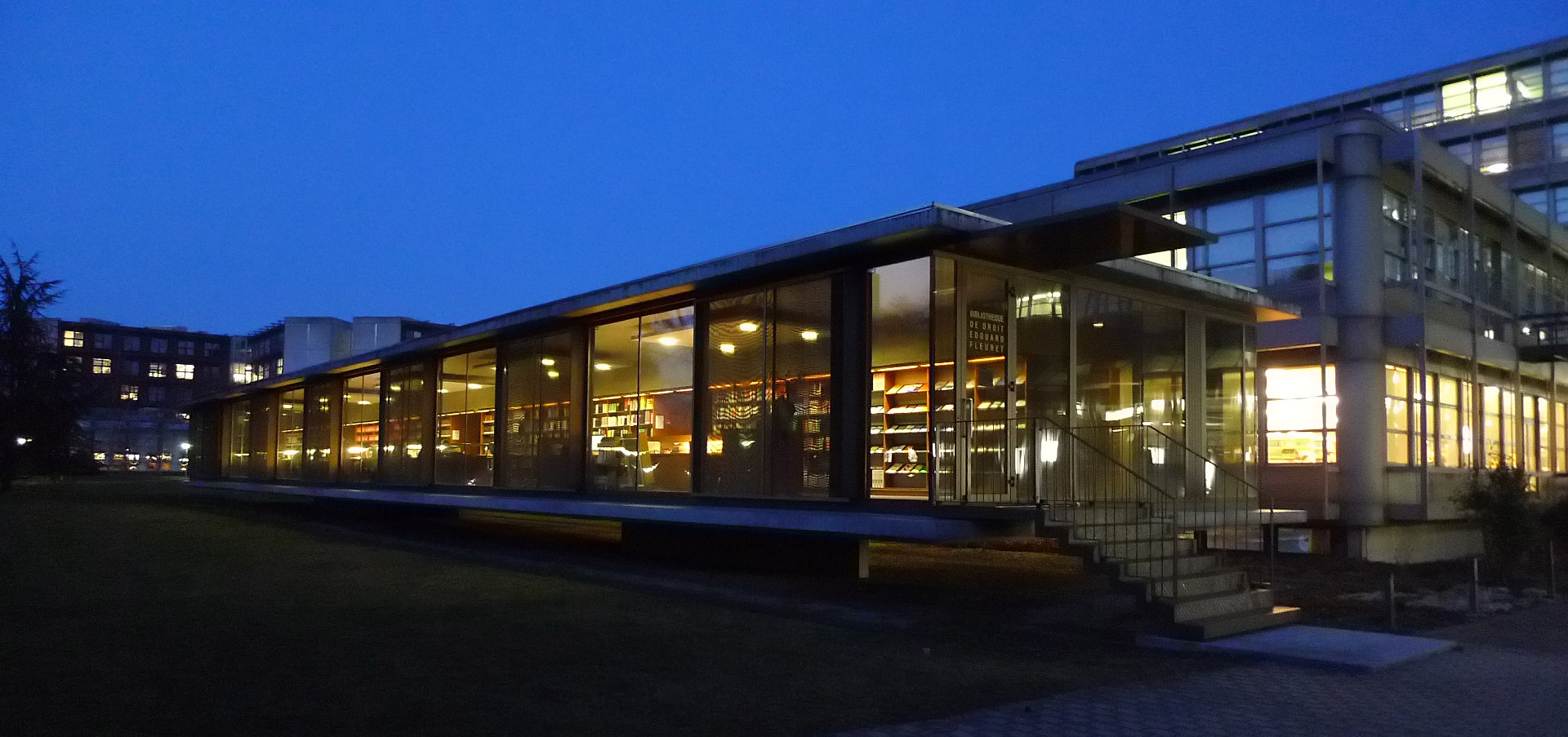
The Édouard Fleuret Library pavilion

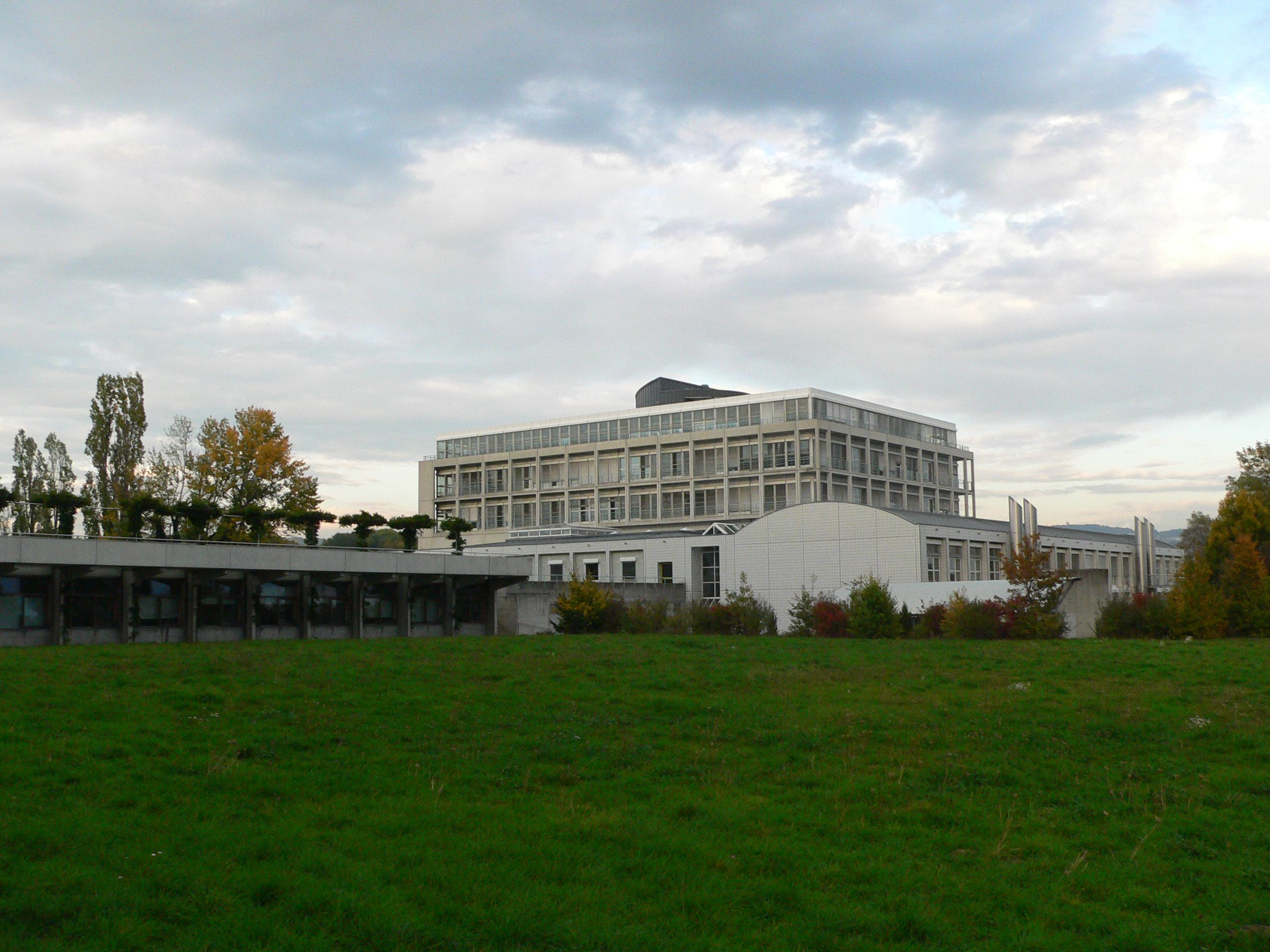
The Génopode building of the University of Lausanne hosts the Center for Integrative Genomics of the University of Lausanne and the central administration of the Swiss Institute of Bioinformatics.

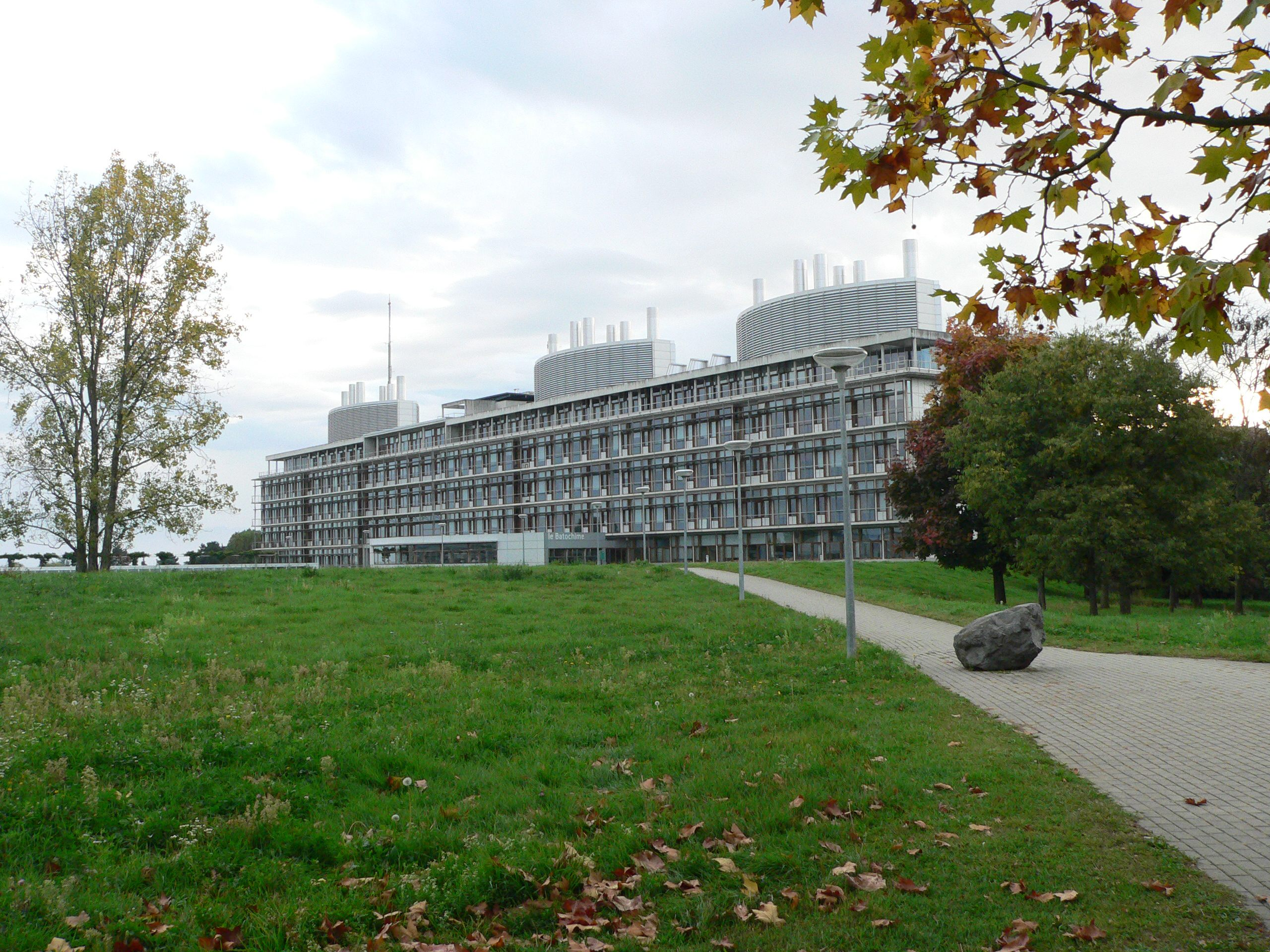
The School of Criminal Justice of the UNIL is the world's oldest school of forensic science and is one of the only European institution to offer a complete education in forensic sciences.

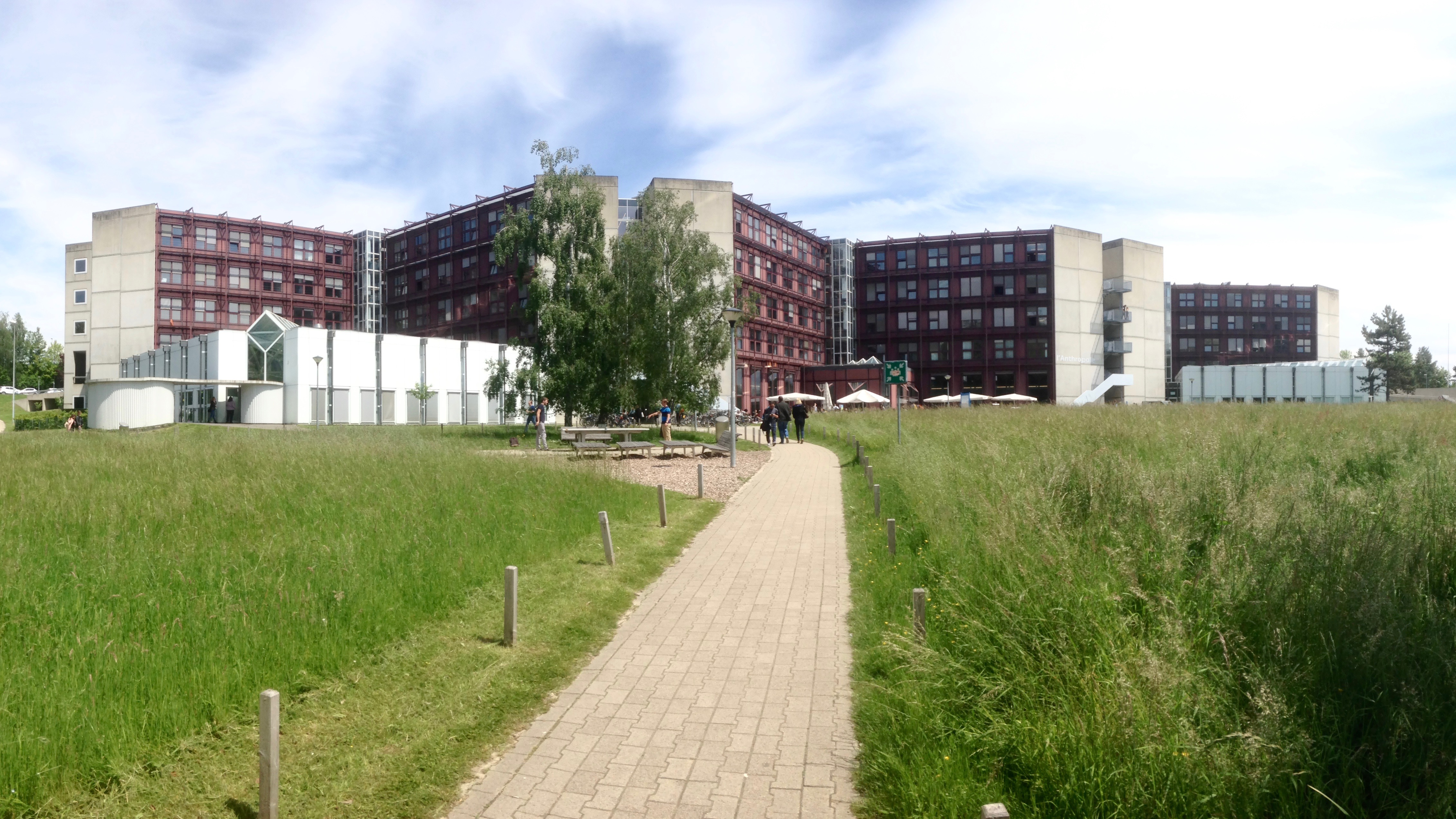
The Anthropole building

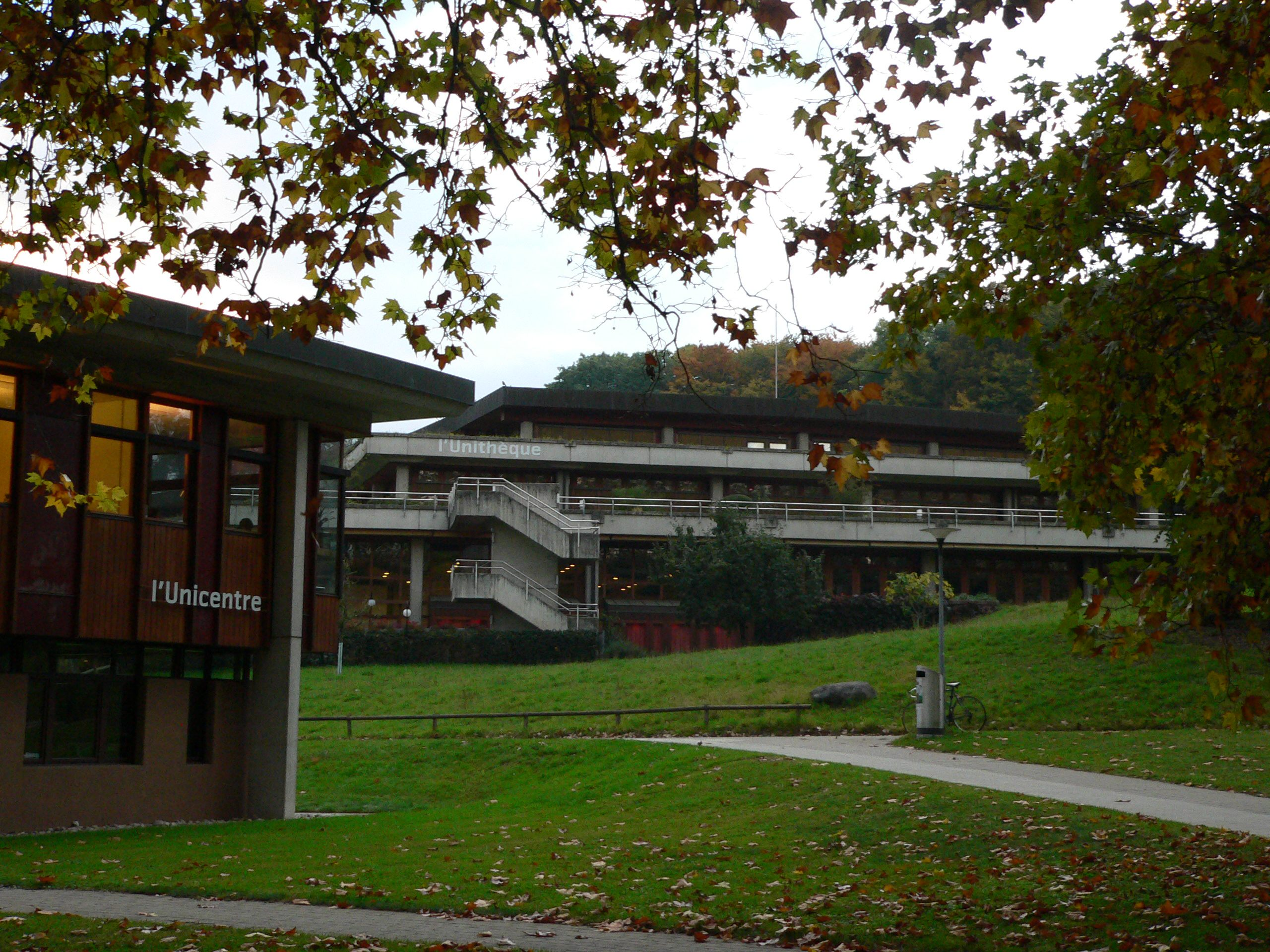
Unithèque building houses one of the two sites of the Cantonal and University Library of Lausanne on the main campus of the UNIL.

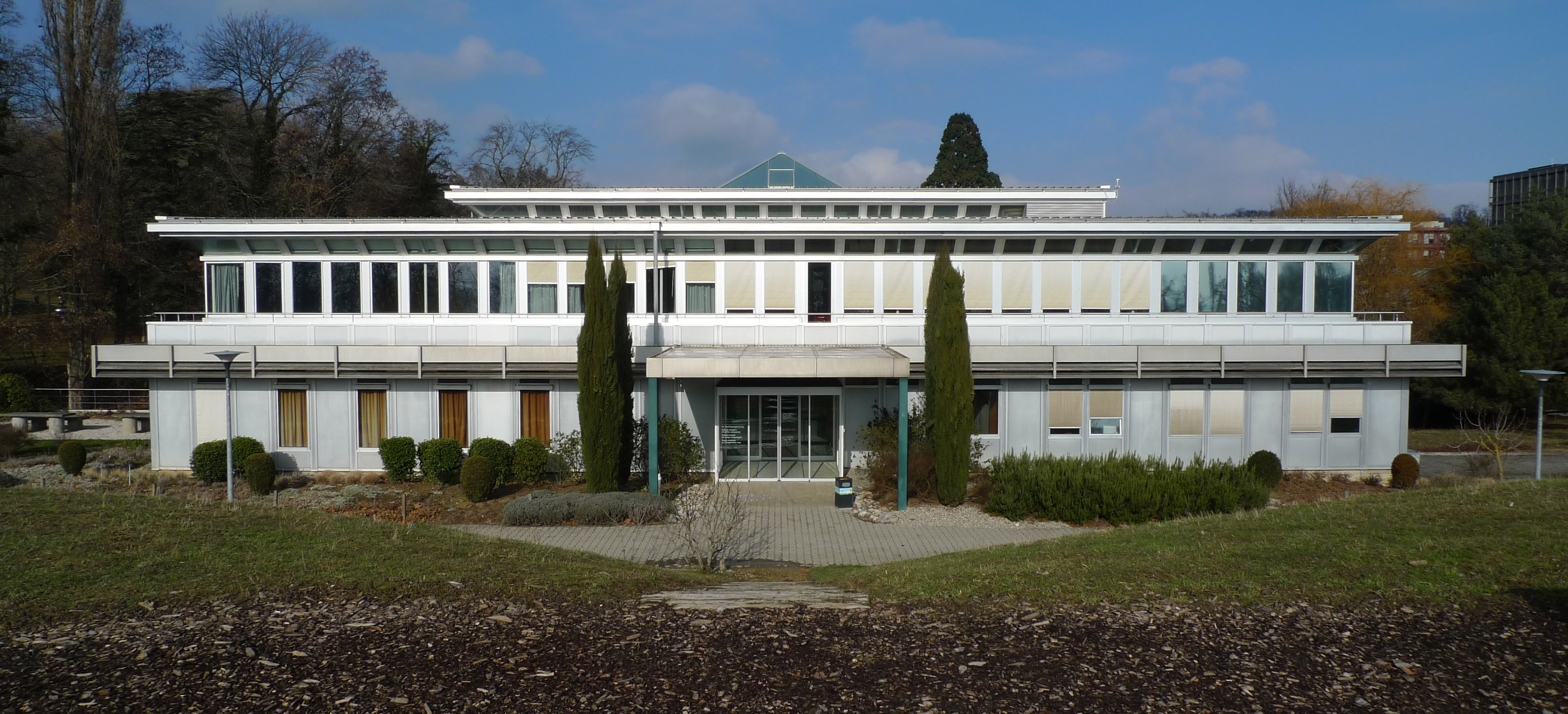
The Swiss Institute of Comparative Law, on the campus of the University of Lausanne

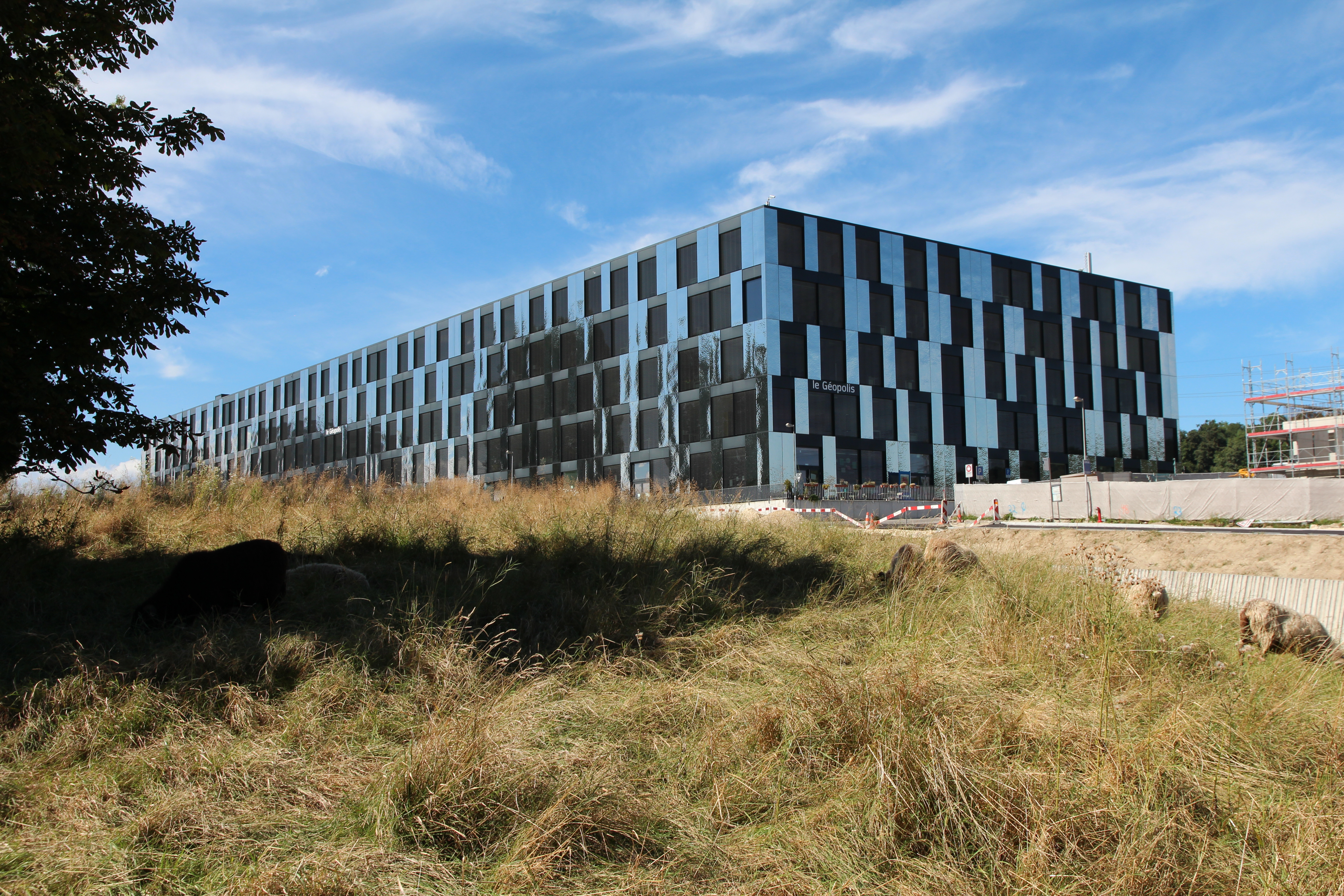
The Géopolis building: Faculty of Geosciences and Environment and Faculty of Social and Political Sciences

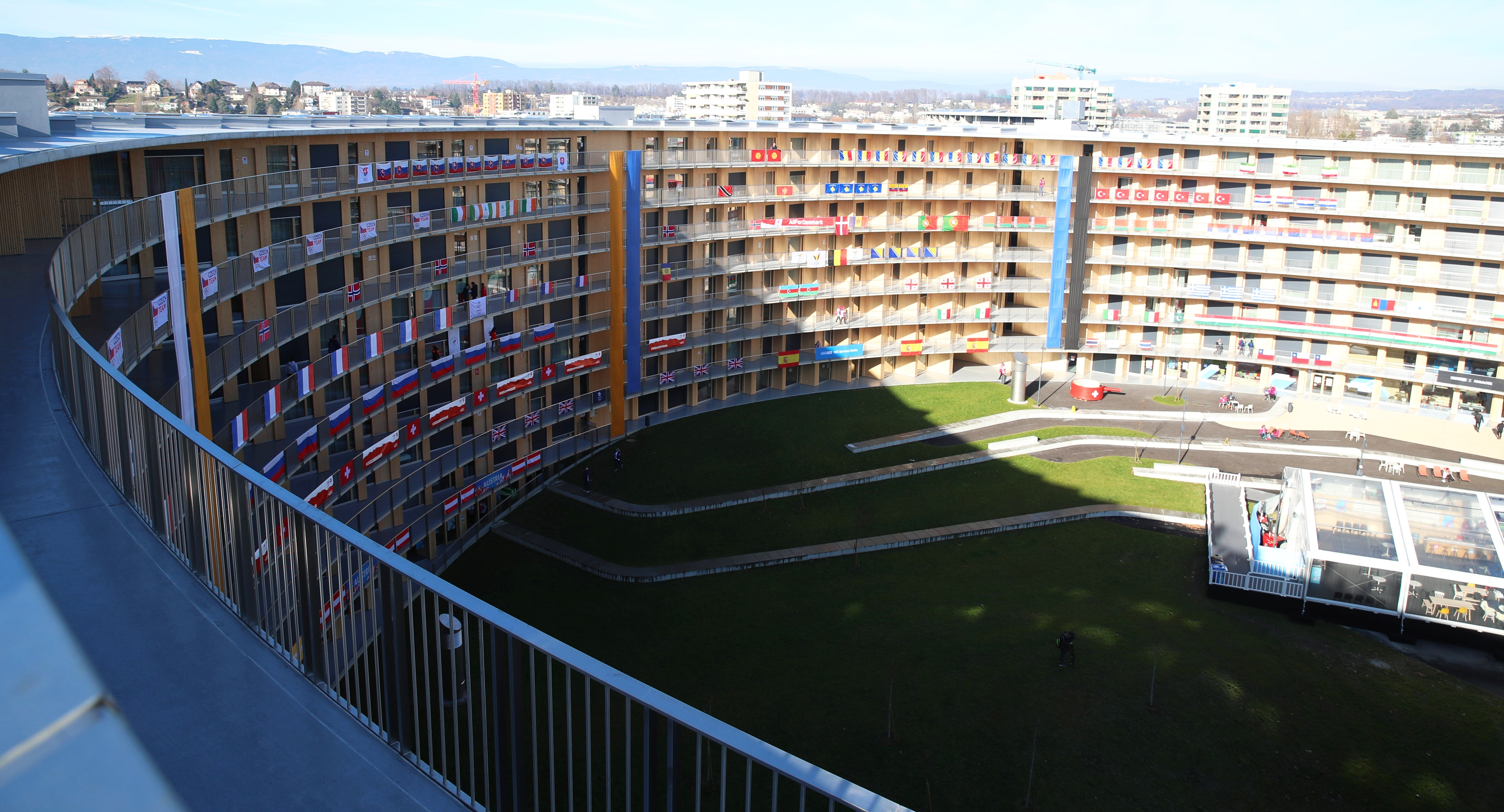
Vortex building, student residence on the campus

=== Other sites ===
In addition to its main campus at the lakeside, the University of Lausanne also has other sites. The Faculty of Biology and Medicine is also located in two other sites: around the University Hospital of Lausanne (CHUV) (site called Bugnon) and in Épalinges (to the north of Lausanne).

The Department of Biochemistry, the Ludwig Cancer Research branch of the University of Lausanne and the WHO Immunology Research and Training Centre and some laboratories of the University Hospital of Lausanne are located in Épalinges. The Biopôle was built next to the Épalinges campus. The Faculty of Biology and Medicine also comprises a fourth site, the Psychiatric Hospital of Cery, in Prilly.

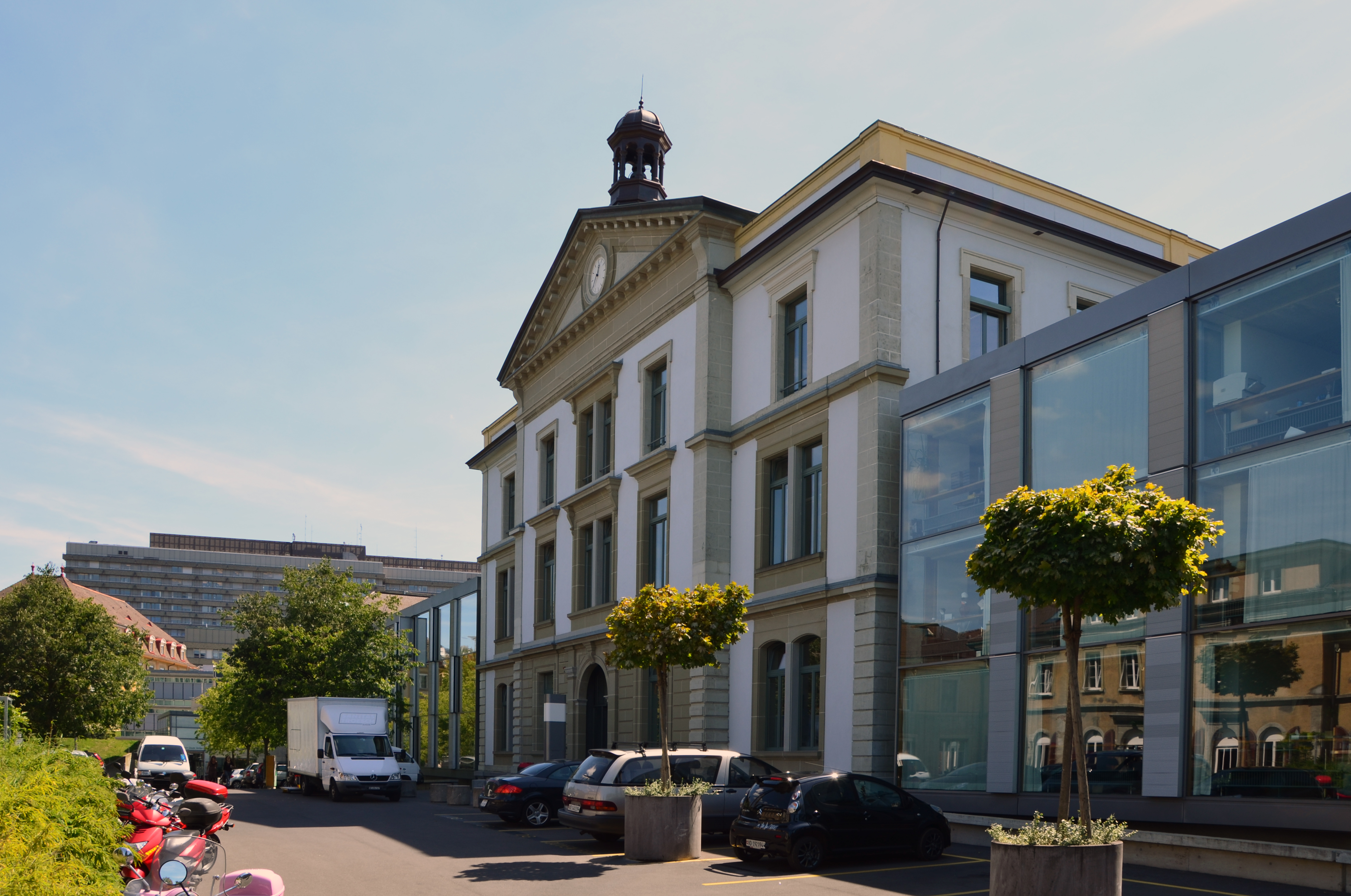
Bugnon 21, headquarters of the University Hospital of Lausanne and of the deanship of the Faculty of Biology and Medicine

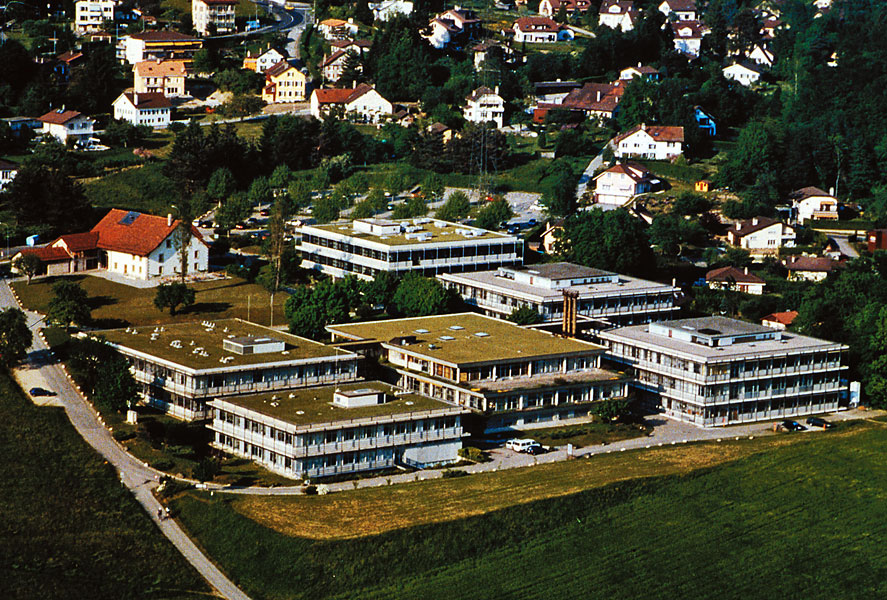
The Center for Immunology and Infection Lausanne (CIIL), UNIL-CHUV, in Épalinges (2007)

== Associated institutions ==
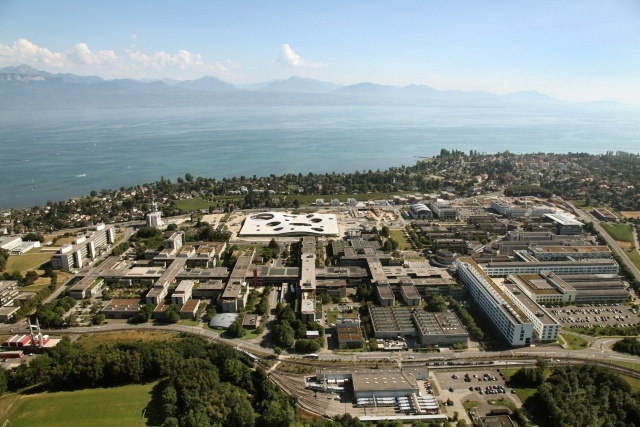
The Swiss Federal Institute of Technology in Lausanne (EPFL) and the University of Lausanne form a large campus near the lake Geneva.

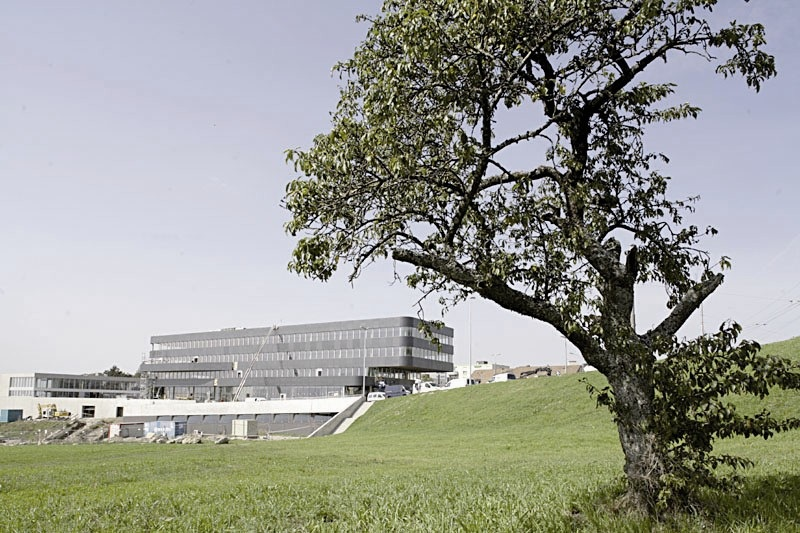
One of the Biopôle buildings in Épalinges (2010). More Biopôle buildings were built there since then.

- Biopôle
- Kurt Bösch Institute (IUKB)
- Center for Biomedical Imaging (CIBM)
- Centre de recherches sur les lettres romandes (CRLR)
- Centre du droit de l'entreprise (CEDIDAC)
- Centre for Advanced Modelling Science (CADMOS)
- École romande de santé publique (ERSP)
- Fondation Edouard Fleuret (FEF)
- Institut Benjamin Constant (IBC)
- Institut romand des sciences bibliques (IRSB)
- Institut universitaire romand de santé au travail (IST)
- International Academy of Sport Science and Technology (AISTS)
- International Institute for Management Development (IMD)
- Jean Monnet Foundation for Europe
- Jules Gonin Eye Hospital
- Ludwig Cancer Research
- Swiss Cancer Centre
- Swiss Centre of Expertise in the Social Sciences
- Swiss Institute of Bioinformatics (SIB)
- Swiss Institute of Comparative Law
- Swiss Institute for Experimental Cancer Research (ISREC)
- Swiss School of Archaeology in Greece
- Swiss Vaccine Research Institute
- University Centre of Legal Medicine (CURML)
  - Swiss Laboratory for Doping Analyses
- WHO Immunology Research and Training Centre

== Reputation and rankings ==
University rankings

Global – Overall
- ARWU World: 101–150 (2023)
- QS World: =212 (2026)
- THE World: =143 (2024)
- USNWR Global: 182 (2023)

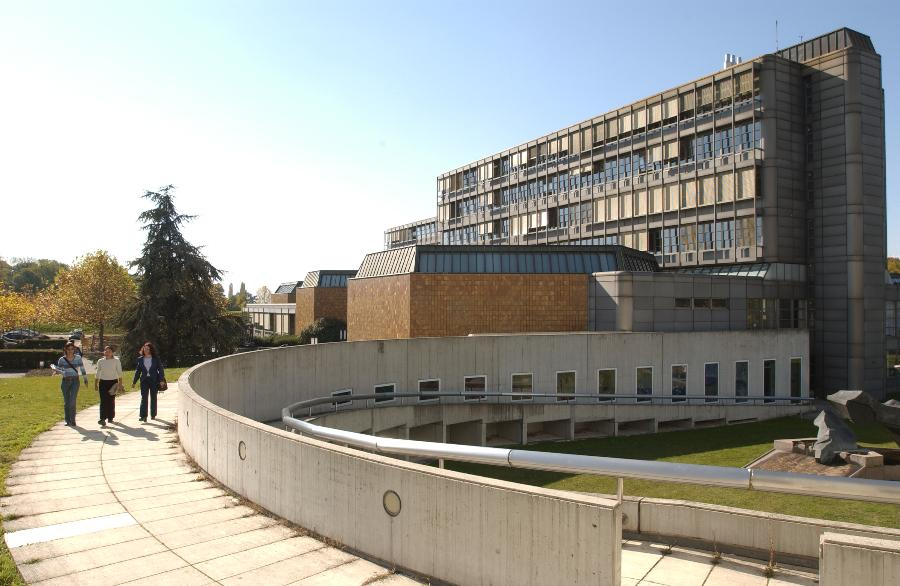
The main building of the Faculty of Law and Criminal Justice and of the Faculty of Business and Economics

The University of Lausanne is consistently ranked among the top 100 universities in the world. Between 2010 and 2018, the Leiden Ranking (CWTS) ranked the University of Lausanne 57th-98th globally, and 15th-38th among all universities in Europe. According to the Times Higher Education World University Rankings (THE), the University of Lausanne ranked 62nd in life sciences worldwide (4th in Switzerland) in 2017. The QS World University Rankings (QS) placed the University of Lausanne 96th in life science and medicine. The Academic Ranking of World Universities (ARWU) ranked the University of Lausanne 101-150 globally.

Below are rankings for the University of Lausanne by the Leiden Ranking (CWTS).

Year	In Europe	In the World
2015–2018	35	98
2014–2017	38	108
2013–2016	28	90
2012–2015	34	99
2011–2014	22	73
2010–2013	15	57
2009–2012	31	88
2008–2011	21	67
2007–2010	16	67
2006–2009	14	67

== Press ==
The UNIL publishes a free monthly campus magazine entitled L'Uniscope The UNIL also publishes Allez savoir !, a free magazine aimed at a larger audience (general public), in January, May, and September.

Besides these, L'auditoire is the students' newspapers from both UNIL and EPFL, with a circulation of 19,000.

== Alumni ==
=== ALUMNIL network ===
In 2011, an on-line network of the UNIL alumni, called ALUMNIL, was created. Since then, regular events (throughout the year) and an annual party (in autumn) are organised every year for the alumni.

=== Royalty ===
- King Ananda Mahidol (Rama VIII) of Thailand (1925-1946)
- King Bhumibol Adulyadej (Rama IX) of Thailand (1927-2016)
- Princess Galyani Vadhana of Thailand
- Prince Bernhard of the Netherlands
- Princess Vera Ignatievna Giedroyc, Lithuanian princess and Russian-Ukrainian surgeon

=== Politics ===
- Jean-Luc Addor Swiss politician
- Samuel Bendahan Swiss politician
- Ignazio Cassis, President of the Swiss Confederation
- İsmail Cem, Minister of Foreign Affairs of Turkey
- Paul Ceresole, President of the Swiss Confederation
- Georges-André Chevallaz, President of the Swiss Confederation
- Pascal Couchepin, President of the Swiss Confederation
- Ernest Chuard, President of the Swiss Confederation
- Jean-Pascal Delamuraz, President of the Swiss Confederation
- Vedat Dicleli, Minister of Economy & Trade of Turkey
- Daniel-Henri Druey, President of the Swiss Confederation
- Florika Fink-Hooijer, prominent European civil servant
- Constant Fornerod, President of the Swiss Confederation
- Nuria Gorrite, President of the Council of State of Vaud
- Şemsettin Günaltay, Prime Minister of Turkey
- Max Huber, Swiss international lawyer and diplomat, President of the International Committee of the Red Cross
- Yvette Jaggi, Swiss National Councillor, Member of the Council of States, and Mayor of Lausanne
- Antoine Louis John Ruchonnet, President of the Swiss Confederation
- Fazıl Küçük, first Vice President of the Republic of Cyprus
- Pascoal Mocumbi, Prime Minister of Mozambique
- Benito Mussolini, Prime Minister of Italy, Duce of Italy
- Marguerite Narbel (1918–2010), member of the Grand Council of Vaud
- Marcel Pilet-Golaz, President of the Swiss Confederation
- Eugène Ruffy, President of the Swiss Confederation
- Marc-Emile Ruchet, President of the Swiss Confederation
- Mohammad Sa'ed, Prime Minister of Iran
- Jonas Savimbi, leader of UNITA, an anti-Communist rebel group in Angola
- Lutz Graf Schwerin von Krosigk, Leading Minister of the German Reich
- Germaine Suter-Morax (1896–1974), Swiss-French Resistance member
- Christine Wohlwend, (born 1978), Liechtensteiner politician

=== Business ===
- Jean-Claude Biver, CEO of Hublot
- Louis C. Camilleri, CEO of Philip Morris International
- Jean Claude Gandur, CEO of Addax Petroleum

=== Literature ===
- Philippe Jaccottet, Swiss poet
- Mohammad-Ali Jamalzadeh, Iranian writer
- Edmond Pidoux, Swiss poet and novelist
- Charles Ferdinand Ramuz, Swiss writer

=== Scholars ===
- André Bonnard (1888–1959), Swiss Hellenist and philologist
- Jacques Dubochet (1942–), biophysicist and co-laureate of the Nobel Prize in Chemistry 2017.
- Pierre Gilliard (1879–1962), French professor, Legion of Honour recipient
- Leo Aryeh Mayer (1895–1959), rector of the Hebrew University of Jerusalem.
- Vilfredo Pareto (1848–1923) Economist, engineer, sociologist, philosopher, Professor of Economics at University of Lausanne, co-founder of the Lausanne School of economics, together with Léon Walras
- Jean Piccard (1884–1963), Swiss-born American chemist, engineer, professor and high-altitude balloonist.
- Martine Rebetez (1961–), Swiss climatologist
- Georges de Rham (1903–1990), Swiss mathematician, known for his contributions to differential topology.
- Pedro Rossello (1897–1970), Catalonian educator and Deputy Director of the International Bureau of Education.
- Jean de Serres (1540–1598), French humanist, Plato translator, Calvinist.
- Léon Walras (1834–1910) Economist, Professor of Economics at University of Lausanne, co-founder of the Lausanne School of economics, together with: Vilfredo Pareto
- Luc E. Weber (1941–), Rector Emeritus of the University of Geneva
- Alexandre Yersin (1863–1943), Swiss-French physician, co-discoverer of the bacillus responsible for the bubonic plague.
- Zaharina Dimitrova (1873–1940), Bulgarian doctor and philanthropist.
- Marguerite Narbel (1918–2010), Swiss biologist

=== Others ===
- Sepp Blatter, President of FIFA
- Murielle Bochud, Swiss physician who is the co-chief of the Department of Epidemiology and Health Systems of Unisanté
- Abraham Davel, independence hero of the Canton of Vaud
- Akbar Etemad, president of the Atomic Energy Organisation of Iran
- Christophe Keckeis, Head of the Swiss Army
- Claude Nicollier, Swiss astronaut
- Bertrand Piccard, Swiss psychiatrist and balloonist
- Nikolaus Senn (1926–2014), co-director of Schweizerische Bankgesellschaft
- Peter Herzen, Soviet surgeon

== School of Lausanne ==
Neoclassical school of thought in economics founded at the University of Lausanne by two of its professors: Léon Walras and Vilfredo Pareto. The School of Lausanne is associated with the development of general equilibrium theory as well as the marginalist revolution.

== See also ==
- Charles Guillaume Loys de Bochat
- List of largest universities by enrollment in Switzerland
- List of modern universities in Europe (1801–1945)
- List of universities in Switzerland
- Cantonal and University Library of Lausanne
- International Academy of Sport Science and Technology (AISTS)
- Jean Monnet Foundation for Europe
- Swiss School of Archaeology in Greece
- University Hospital of Lausanne (CHUV)

== Notes and references ==
=== Bibliography ===
- (in French) Jean-Philippe Leresche, Frédéric Joye-Cagnard, Martin Benninghoff and Raphaël Ramuz, Gouverner les universités. L'exemple de la coordination Genève-Lausanne (1990-2010), Presses polytechniques et universitaires romandes, 2012 (ISBN 9782880749316).
- (in French) Nadja Maillard, L'Université de Lausanne à Dorigny, Éditions Infolio, 488 pages, 2013 (ISBN 978-2-88474-280-1).
