= Grand Council of Vaud =

Legislature of Vaud, Switzerland

Grand Council of Vaud Grand Conseil du Canton de Vaud

Type
- Type: Unicameral of Canton of Vaud
- Term limits: 5 years

Leadership
- President: Stéphane Montangero, PS since 2025
- First Vice-President: Patrick Simonin, PLR since 2025
- Second Vice-President: Nathalie Jaccard, Greens since 2025

Structure
- Seats: 150
- Political groups: Liberal-Radicals (PLR) (50); Social Democratic Party (PS) (32); Greens (PES) (24); People’s Party (UDC) (23); Green Liberals (PVL) (14); Together Left (EAG) (7)

Elections
- Last election: 20 March 2022 (1st round) 10 April 2022 (2nd round)
- Next election: 2027

Meeting place
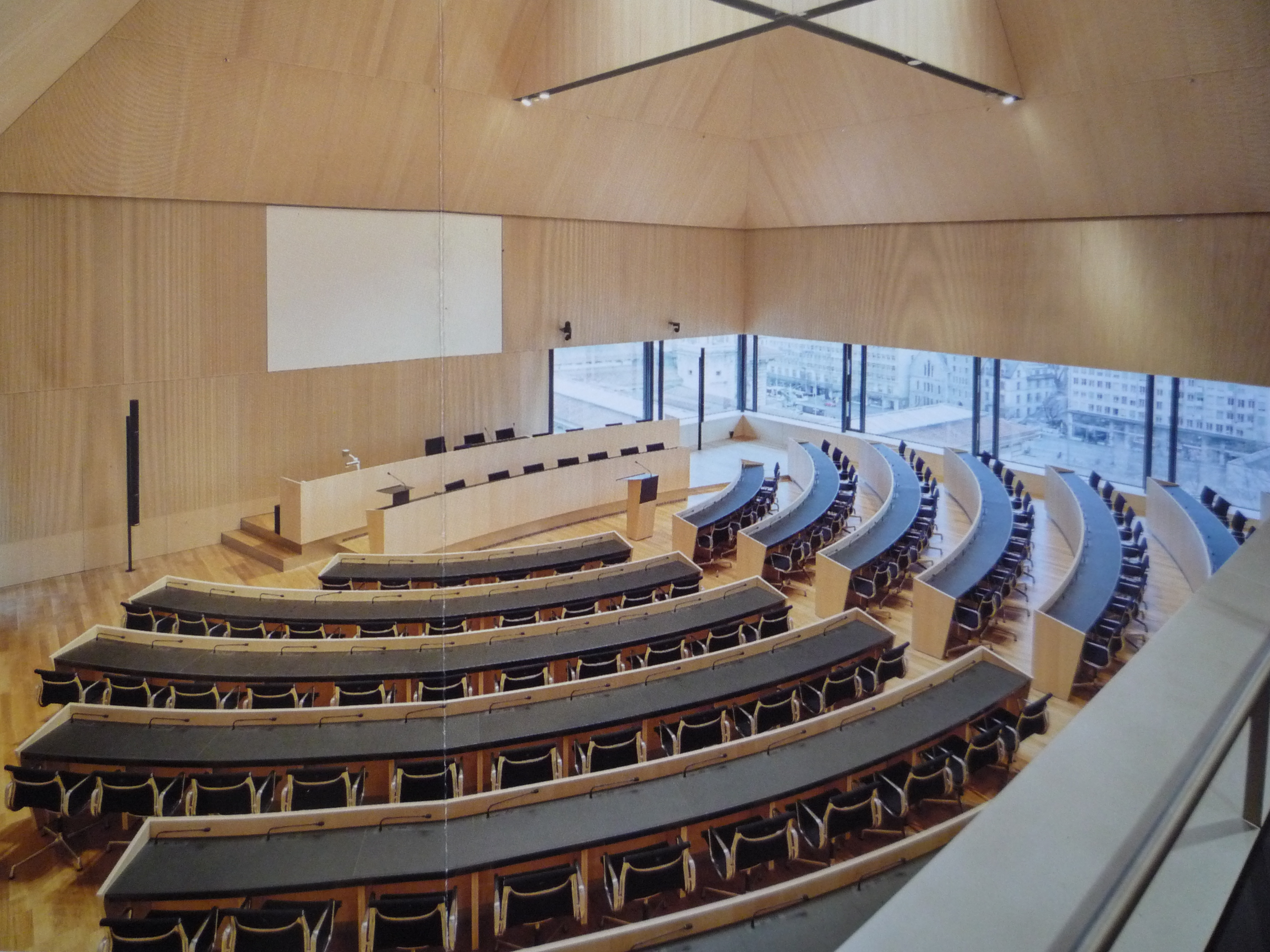
- Assembly room of the Grand Council of Vaud

The Grand Council of Vaud (French: Grand Conseil de Vaud) is the legislature of the canton of Vaud, in Switzerland. Vaud has a unicameral legislature. The Great Council has 150 seats, with members elected every five years.

In May 1981, Marguerite Narbel became the first woman to serve as president of the Grand Council of Vaud, holding the position until the following year. Narbel left the Grand Council in 1986.

== Composition ==
The largest groups are the Liberals (50 seats), followed by the Socialist group (32 seats), the Green group (24 seats), the People's Party (23 seats) and the Green Liberals group (14 seats).

== See also ==
- Council of State of Vaud
- List of cantonal legislatures of Switzerland
