= Council of State of Vaud =

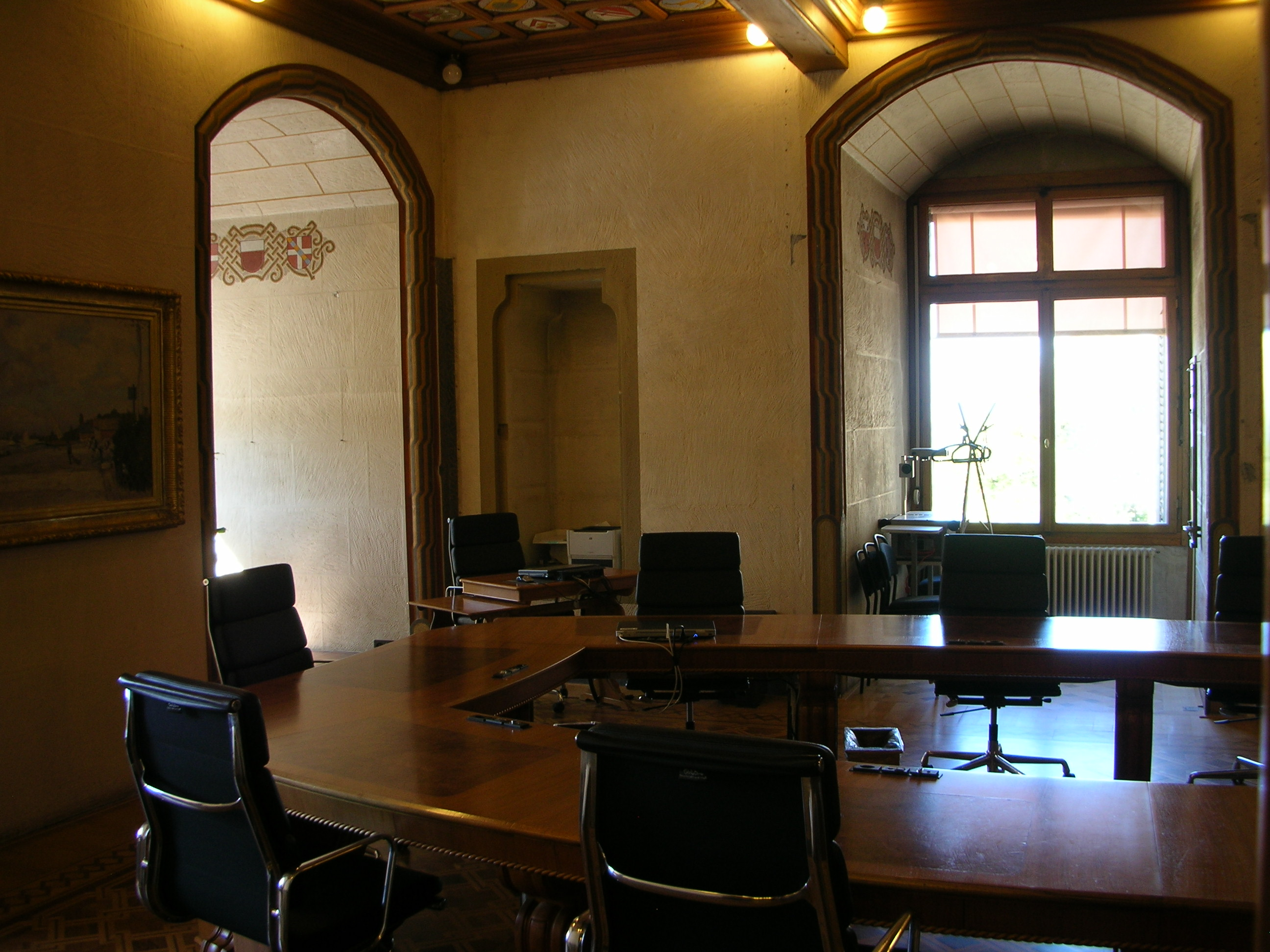
The meeting room of the Council of State in the Château Saint-Maire in Lausanne.

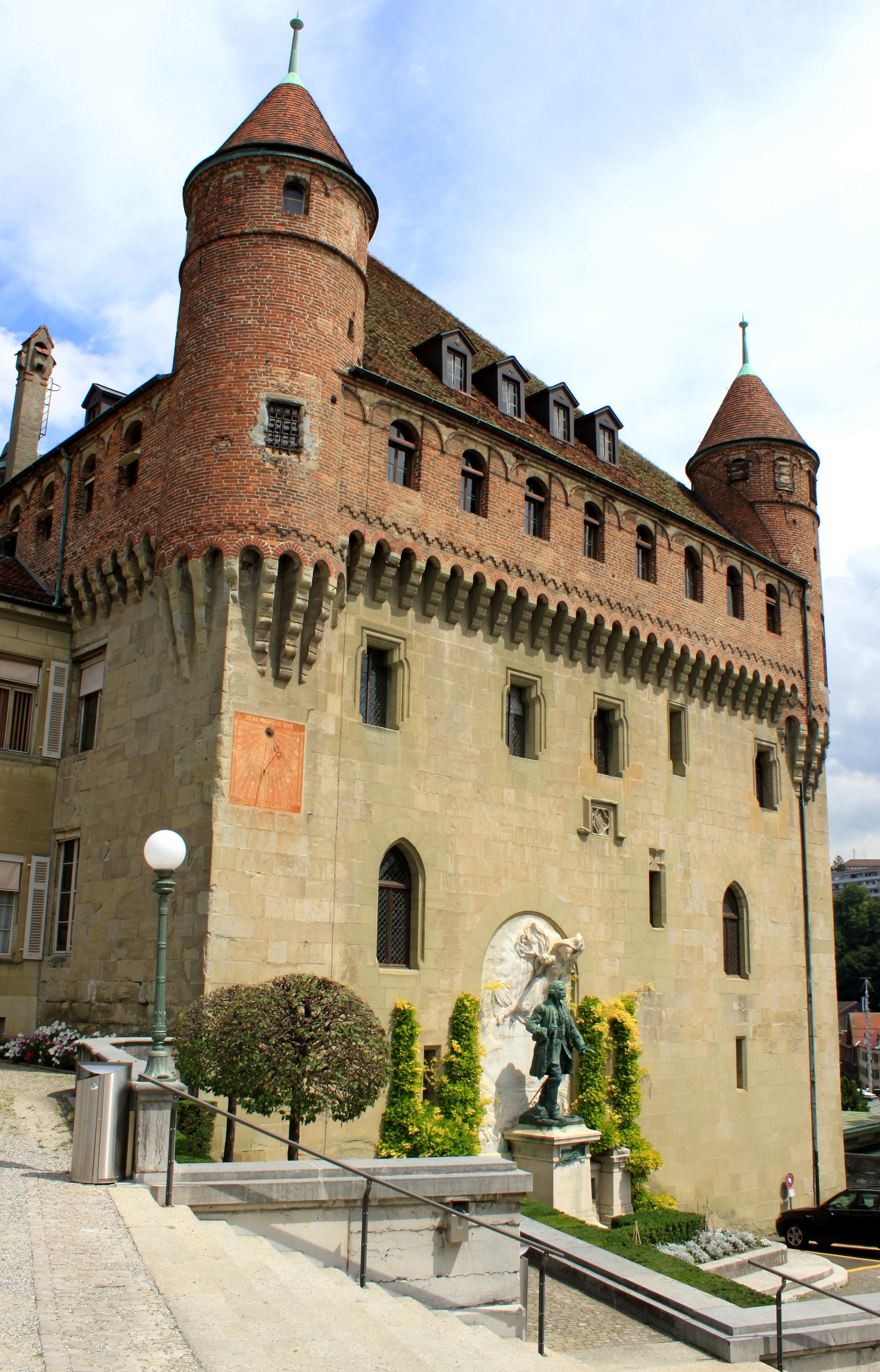
The Château Saint-Maire.

The Council of State of the Canton of Vaud (French: Conseil d'État du Canton de Vaud) is the executive organ of the Canton of Vaud, in Switzerland. Vaud has a seven-member Conseil d'État. The responsibilities of the Council of State is to run the administration, submit laws and decrees to the Grand Council, observe a budget and adopt regulations or directives. Essentially, the Cantons define their own structure within federal regulations. Switzerland consists of twenty-six cantons in which each can influence the federal government. Vaud is a part of these cantons, and it is the central area connected to high trafficked communication routes in Switzerland.

== Members ==
Name	Party	Office	Elected	Notes
Frédéric Borloz	PLR	Education and Vocational Training	2022	
Valérie Dittli	LC	Finance and Agriculture	2022	
Nuria Gorrite	Social Democratic Party	Culture, Infrastructure and Human Resources	2012	
Christelle Luisier Brodard	PLR	Institutions, Territory and Sport	2020	
Isabelle Moret	PLR	Economy, Innovation, Employment and Heritage	2022	
Rebecca Ruiz	Social Democratic Party	Health and Social Action	2019	
Vassilis Venizelos	Green Party	Youth, Environment and Safety	2022	

== See also ==
- Grand Council of Vaud
- List of cantonal executives of Switzerland
