= Order of precedence in Switzerland =

Relative preeminence of officials for ceremonial purposes

The Swiss order of precedence is a hierarchy of important positions within the government of Switzerland. It has no legal standing but is used by ceremonial protocol. The order of precedence is determined by the Protocol Regulations and the Table of Precedence of the Federal Department of Foreign Affairs. Unless otherwise noted, precedence among persons of equal rank is determined by seniority. As a general rule, spouses share the same rank.

== Table of precedence ==
Color legend
Governments, Parliaments and Courts
of the Confederation, Cantons and Communes
Diplomats
Armed forces
Federal administration
Religious and educational authorities

Rank	Position	Incumbent (as of 1 January 2026)
1	President of the Confederation	Guy Parmelin
2	Vice President of the Federal Council	Ignazio Cassis
3	Federal Councillors (Note: Precedence is determined by date of election.)	Karin Keller-Sutter, Albert Rösti, Élisabeth Baume-Schneider, Beat Jans, Martin Pfister
3	Commanding General (Note: A General is only elected in time of war, and is ranked after the Federal Councillors.)	vacant in time of peace
4	President of the National Council	Maja Riniker
5	President of the Council of States	Andrea Caroni
6	Federal Chancellor	Viktor Rossi
7	President of the Federal Supreme Court	Martha Niquille
8	Former Federal Councillors	see List of members of the Federal Council
9	Presidents of the cantonal governments (Note: Precedence of cantonal authorities is determined by the order of cantons in article 1 of the Federal Constitution.)	see List of cantonal executives
9	Cardinals; Prince; Members of the Council of the Federation of Protestant Churches; Chief Rabbis	
10	Vice Presidents of the National Council	Pierre-André Page (1st), (Note: The Vice Presidency of both chambers are numbered. Whenever the President is not available during the meetings of Parliament they are replaced by the available Vice Presidents. Usually the 1st Vice President succeeds the outgoing President with the 2nd Vice President taking the place of the 1st one.) Katja Christ (2nd)
11	Vice Presidents of the Council of States	Stefan Engler (1st), Werner Salzmann (2nd)
12	Vice President of the Federal Supreme Court	
12	Prince Bishops	
13	Chief of the Armed Forces	Thomas Süssli
13	Secretaries of State	
14	Members of the National Council	see List of members of the National Council
15	Members of the Council of States	see List of members of the Council of States
16	Judges of the Federal Supreme Court	see List of judges of the Federal Supreme Court
17	President of the Federal Criminal Court	Tito Ponti
18	President of the Federal Administrative Court	Jean-Luc Baechler
19	President of the Federal Patent Court	Mark Schweizer
20	Heads of Swiss diplomatic missions	
20	Lieutenant Generals	
20	Chairman of the Board of the Swiss National Bank; Chairman of the Board of Swiss Federal Railways; Chairman of the Board of Swiss Post	Martin Schlegel; Vincent Ducrot; Urs Schwaller
20	President of the Board of the Swiss Federal Institutes of Technology	Fritz Schiesser
21	Vice Presidents of the cantonal governments	see List of cantonal executives
22	Vice President of the Federal Criminal Court	Giuseppe Muschietti
23	Vice President of the Federal Administrative Court	Marianne Ryter
24	Vice President of the Federal Patent Court	Frank Schnyder
25	Members of the cantonal governments	see List of cantonal executives
26	Members of the Board of the Swiss National Bank	Fritz Zurbrügg, Andréa Maechler
27	Ambassadors	
27	Major Generals	
27	Delegates of the Federal Council; Directors of Federal Offices; Secretary-General of the Federal Assembly; Secretaries-General of the Federal Departments; Secretary-General of the Federal Supreme Court; Federal Vice Chancellors of the Confederation; Trade agreement delegates	see Federal administration
28	Mayor of Bern	Alec von Graffenried
28	Rectors of universities and equivalent establishments	
29	Presidents of cantonal legislatures	see List of cantonal legislatures
29	Brigadier Generals	
29	Deputy directors	
30	University deans and directors	
31	Presidents of the cantonal courts	
31	Deans of religious authorities	
32	Judges of the Federal Criminal Court	see List of judges of the Federal Criminal Court
32	Professors of universities and equivalent establishments	
33	Judges of the Federal Administrative Court	see List of judges of the Federal Administrative Court
34	Judges of the Federal Patent Court	see List of judges of the Federal Patent Court
35	Presidents of municipal executive authorities	
36	Chancellors of cantons	
36	Ministers	
36	Colonels	
36	Vice directors	
37	Members of cantonal legislatures	see List of cantonal legislatures
38	Cantonal judges; Cantonal public prosecutors; Presidents of municipal legislatures	
38	Lieutenant Colonels	
39	Majors	
39	Section heads	
39	Priests and Protestant Ministers	
40	Vicars	
