= 2015 Swiss Federal Council election =

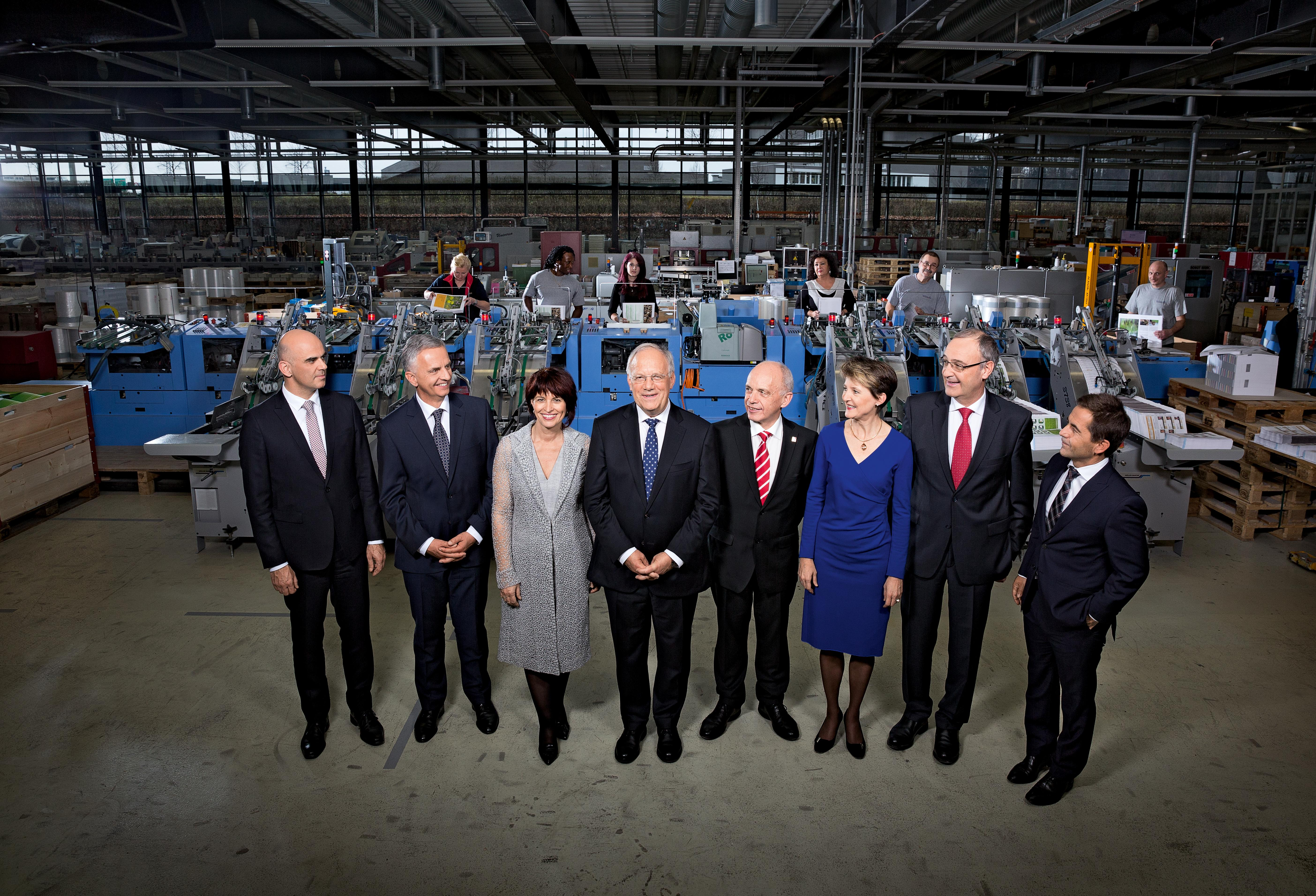
The official photograph of the Swiss Federal Council for 2016. From left to right: Alain Berset, Didier Burkhalter, Doris Leuthard (Vice President for 2016), Johann Schneider-Ammann (President for 2016), Ueli Maurer, Simonetta Sommaruga, Guy Parmelin and Federal Chancellor Walter Thurnherr.

An election for all seven members of the Federal Council, the Government of Switzerland, was held on 9 December 2015, following the federal election on 19 October 2015, for the 2016–2020 term.

Eveline Widmer-Schlumpf, a member of the Conservative Democratic Party (BDP/PBD), announced she would not run for reelection after the Swiss People's Party (SVP/UDC) won a record 29.4% of the vote, whilst her own party received 4.1% of the vote. The SVP/UDC was widely expected to fill her seat in the election; it chose Thomas Aeschi (Zug), Guy Parmelin (Vaud) and Norman Gobbi (Ticino) as candidates for the seat, with Aeschi being the favourite at the time.

Guy Parmelin, of the SVP/UDC, was ultimately elected by the Federal Assembly on 9 December 2015. Parmelin, a farmer and winegrower from Bursins in the canton of Vaud, became the first Federal Councillor of the Swiss People's Party from the French-speaking part of Switzerland.

There was a minor cabinet reshuffle after the election, as newly elected Federal Councillor Parmelin was selected to become head of the Federal Department of Defence, Civil Protection and Sports, replacing fellow SVP/UDC member Ueli Maurer, who became head of the Federal Department of Finance. The SVP/UDC regained its second seat on the Federal Council, which it had lost in 2008, when the newly created BDP/PBD split from the SVP/UDC.

== Incumbents ==
Incumbents, in descending order of seniority, including political party affiliation and department at the time of the election:

- Doris Leuthard (CVP/PDC), from Aargau, head of the Federal Department of Environment, Transport, Energy and Communications,
- Eveline Widmer-Schlumpf (BDP/PBD), from Grisons, head of the Federal Department of Finance (did not run for reelection),
- Ueli Maurer (SVP/UDC), from Zürich, head of the Federal Department of Defence, Civil Protection and Sports,
- Didier Burkhalter (FDP.The Liberals), from Neuchâtel, head of the Federal Department of Foreign Affairs,
- Simonetta Sommaruga (SPS/PSS), from Bern, head of the Federal Department of Justice and Police,
- Johann Schneider-Ammann (FDP.The Liberals), from Bern, head of the Federal Department of Economic Affairs, Education and Research,
- Alain Berset (SPS/PSS), from Fribourg, head of the Federal Department of Home Affairs.

== Results ==
Source showing only the final tallies in favour of the winner of each seat:

=== Seat held by Doris Leuthard ===
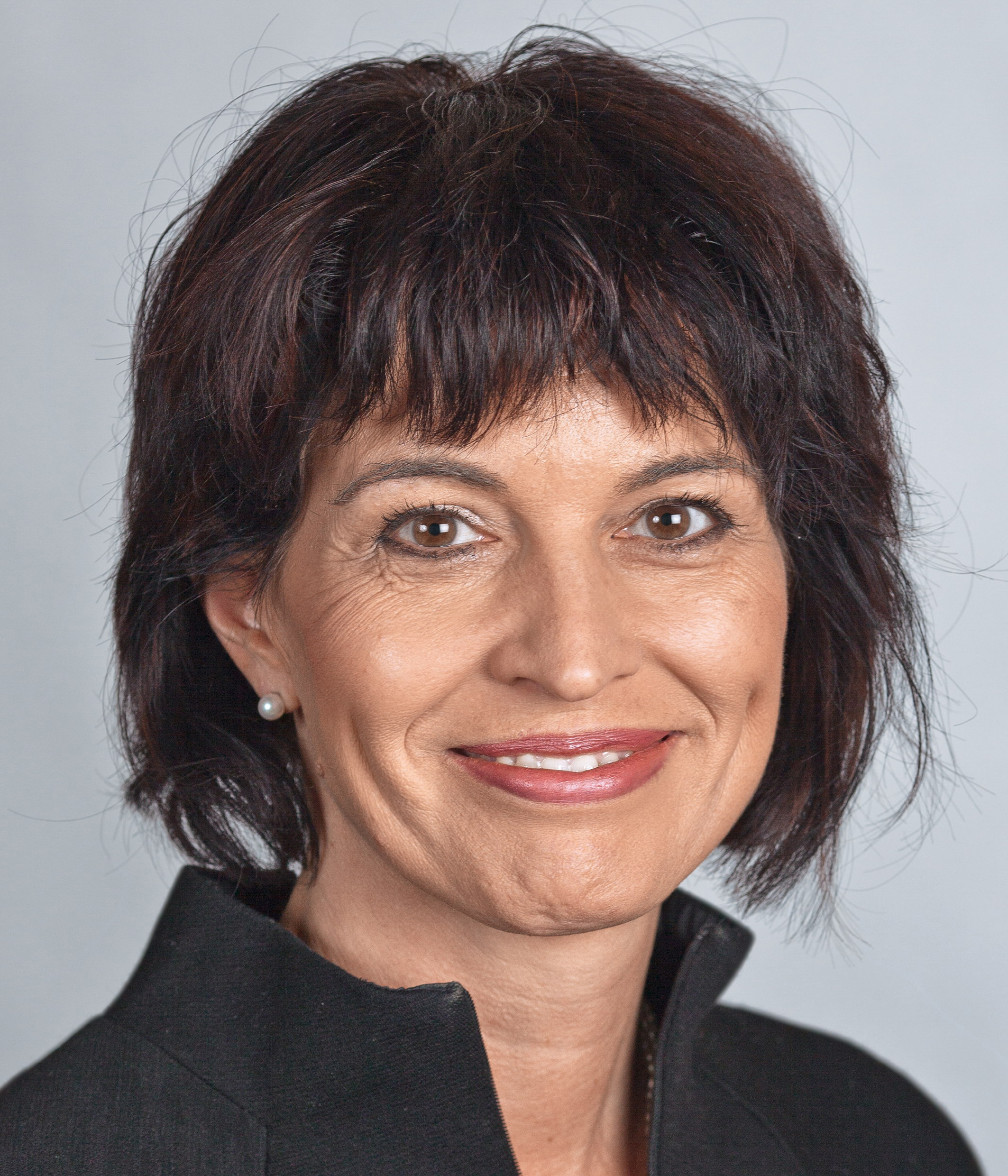
Federal Councillor Doris Leuthard

Doris Leuthard (CVP/PDC) was reelected in the first round of voting.

	Round 1
Doris Leuthard	215
Votes received by other persons	19
Votes cast	245
Invalid votes	3
Blank votes	8
Valid votes	234
Absolute majority	118

=== Seat held by Ueli Maurer ===
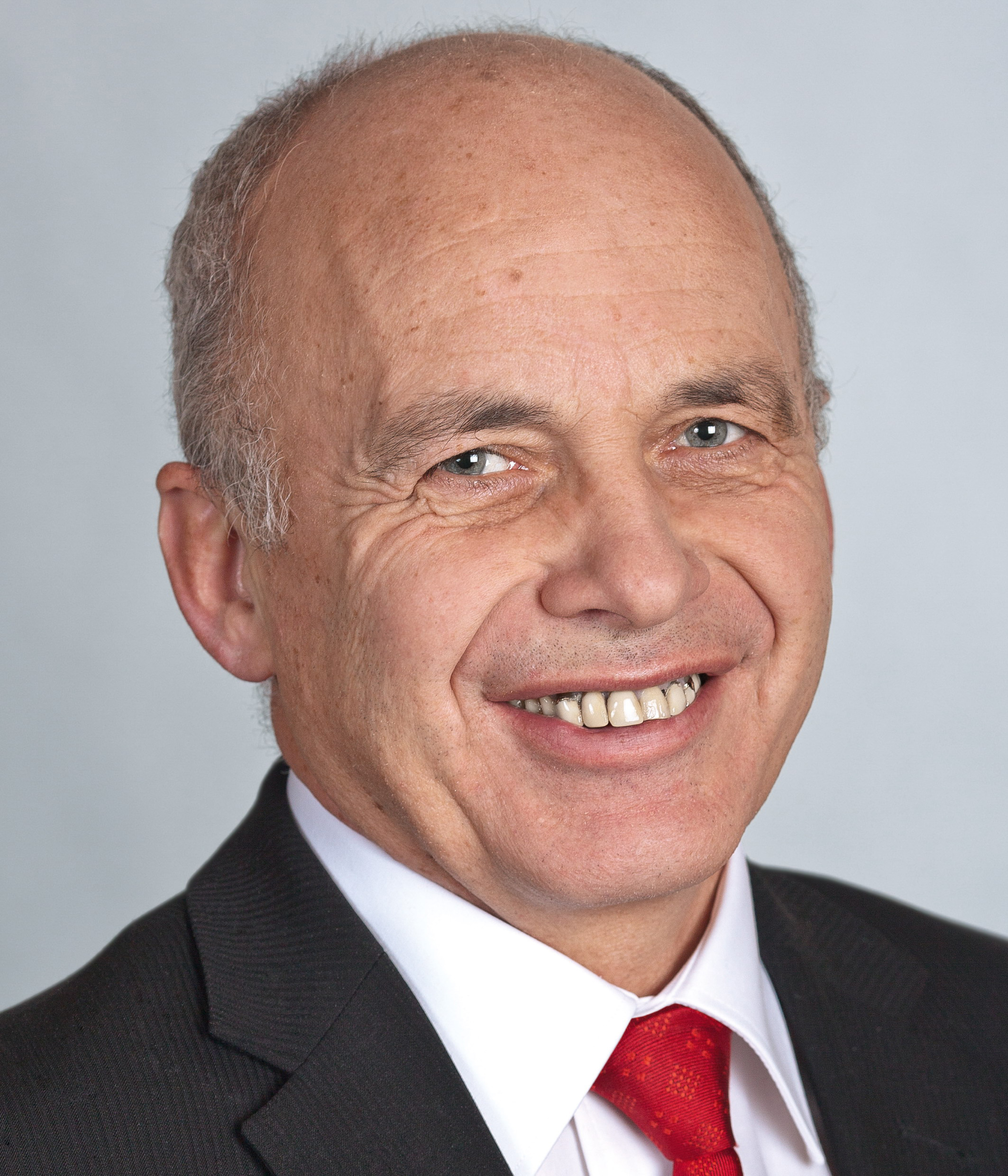
Federal Councillor Ueli Maurer

Ueli Maurer (SVP/UDC) was reelected in the first round of voting.

	Round 1
Ueli Maurer	173
Thomas Hurter	10
Votes received by other persons	27
Votes cast	245
Invalid votes	3
Blank votes	32
Valid votes	210
Absolute majority	106

=== Seat held by Didier Burkhalter ===
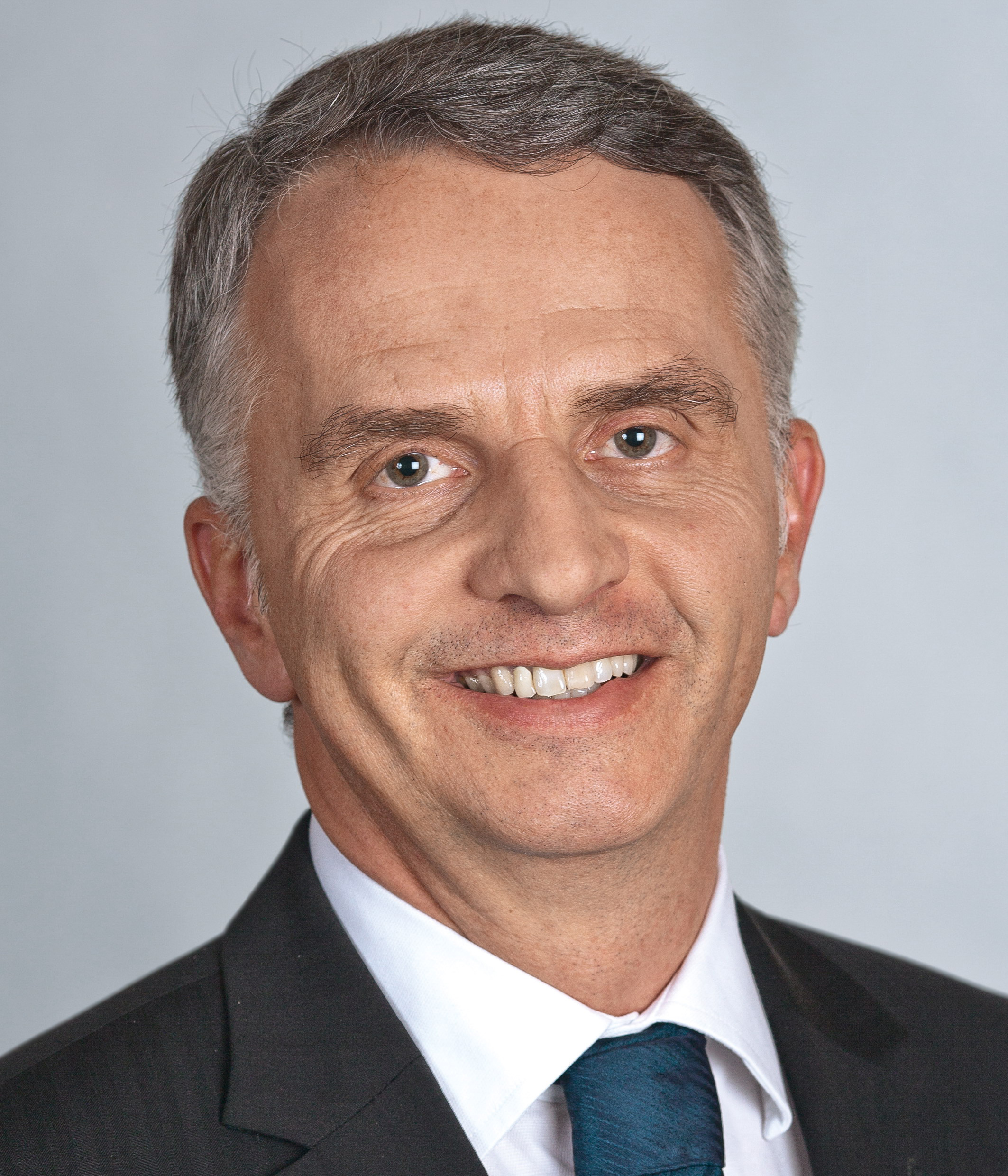
Federal Councillor Didier Burkhalter

Didier Burkhalter (FDP.The Liberals) was reelected in the first round of voting.

	Round 1
Didier Burkhalter	217
Votes received by other persons	14
Votes cast	244
Invalid votes	0
Blank votes	13
Valid votes	231
Absolute majority	116

=== Seat held by Simonetta Sommaruga ===
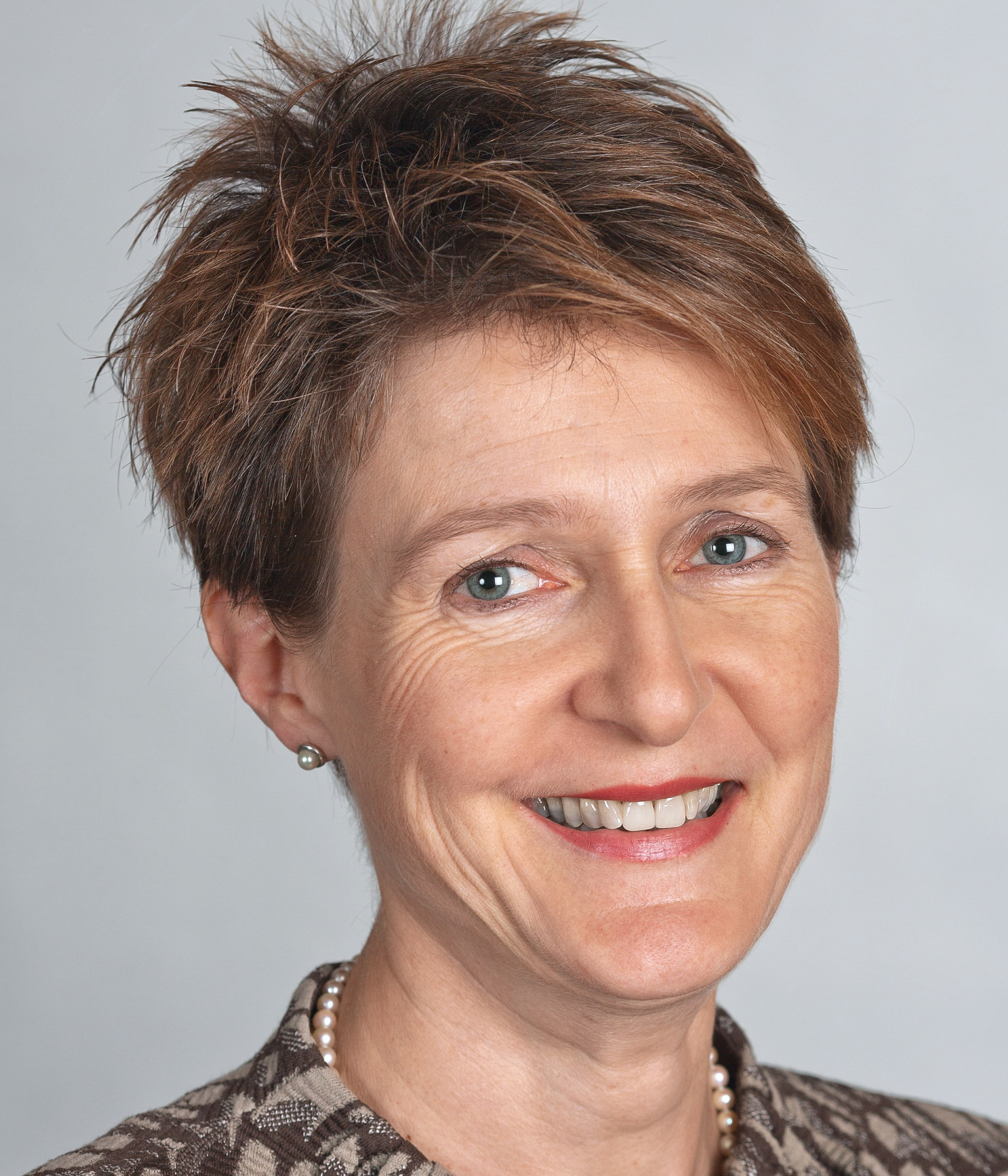
Federal Councillor Simonetta Sommaruga

Simonetta Sommaruga (SPS/PSS) was reelected in the first round of voting.

	Round 1
Simonetta Sommaruga	182
Daniel Jositsch	11
Votes received by other persons	28
Votes cast	245
Invalid votes	5
Blank votes	19
Valid votes	221
Absolute majority	111

=== Seat held by Johann Schneider-Ammann ===
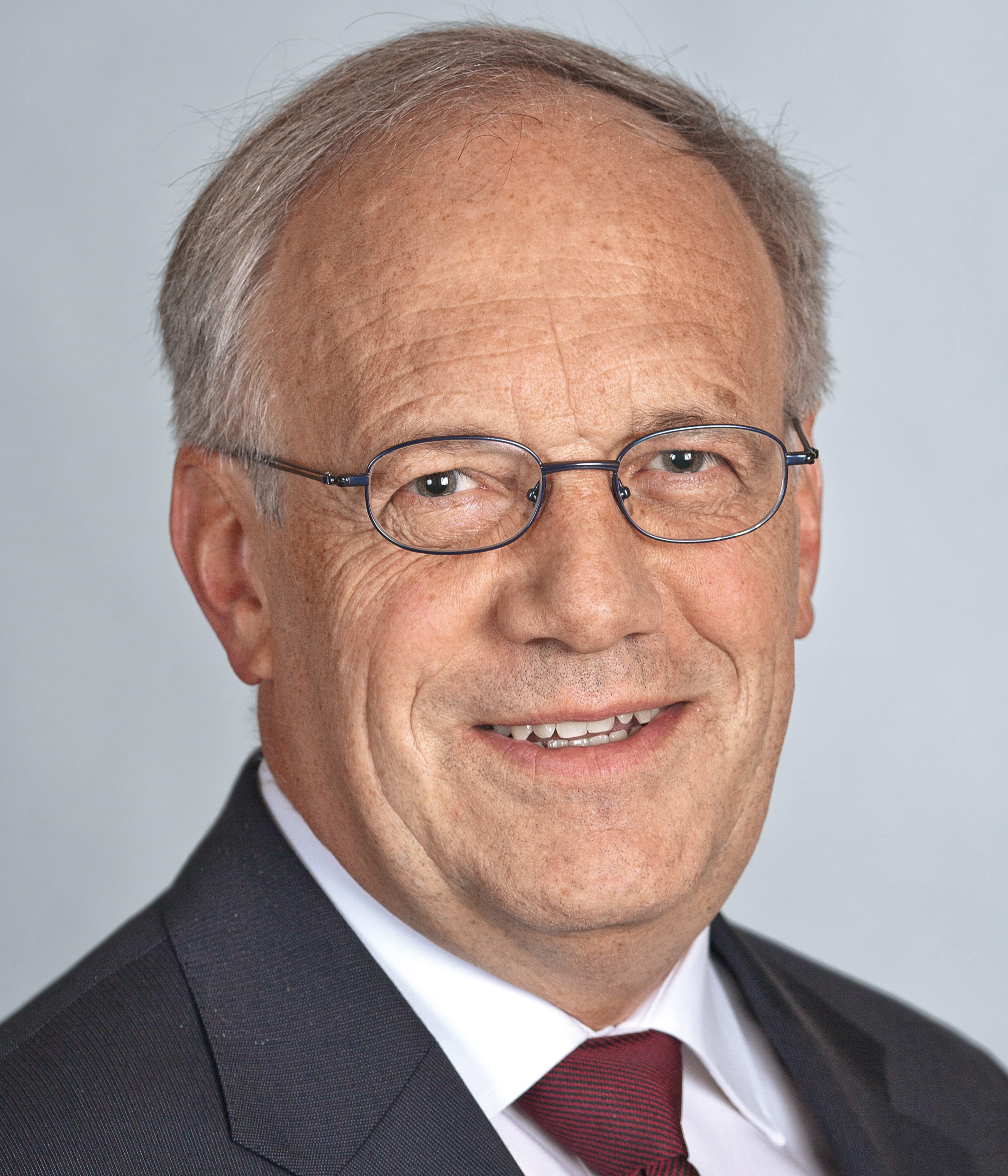
Federal Councillor Johann Schneider-Ammann

Johann Schneider-Ammann (FDP.The Liberals) was reelected in the first round of voting.

	Round 1
Johann Schneider-Ammann	191
Votes received by other persons	28
Votes cast	244
Invalid votes	2
Blank votes	23
Valid votes	219
Absolute majority	110

=== Seat held by Alain Berset ===
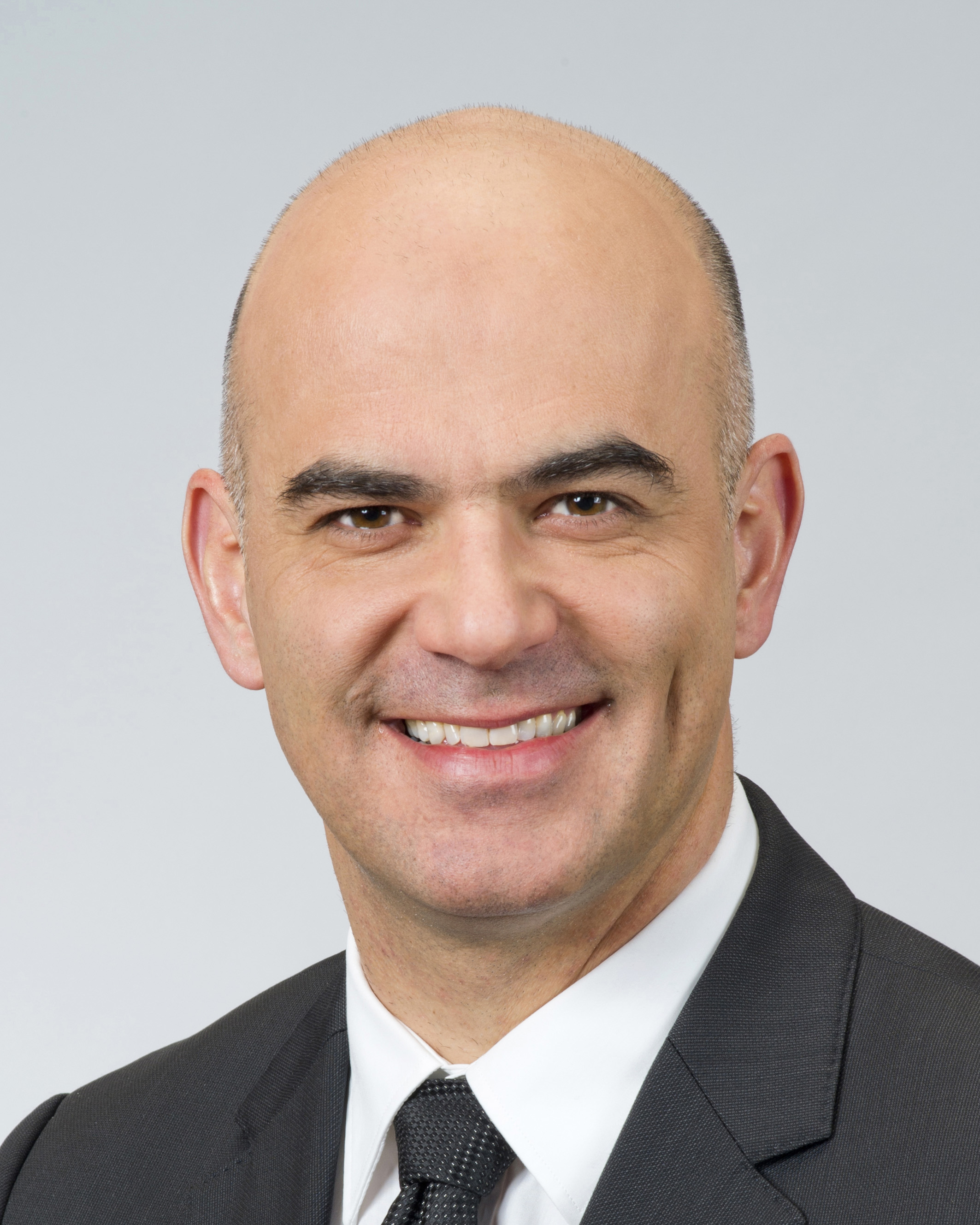
Federal Councillor Alain Berset

Alain Berset (SPS/PSS) was reelected in the first round of voting.

	Round 1
Alain Berset	210
Votes received by other persons	23
Votes cast	243
Invalid votes	2
Blank votes	8
Valid votes	233
Absolute majority	117

=== Vacant seat ===
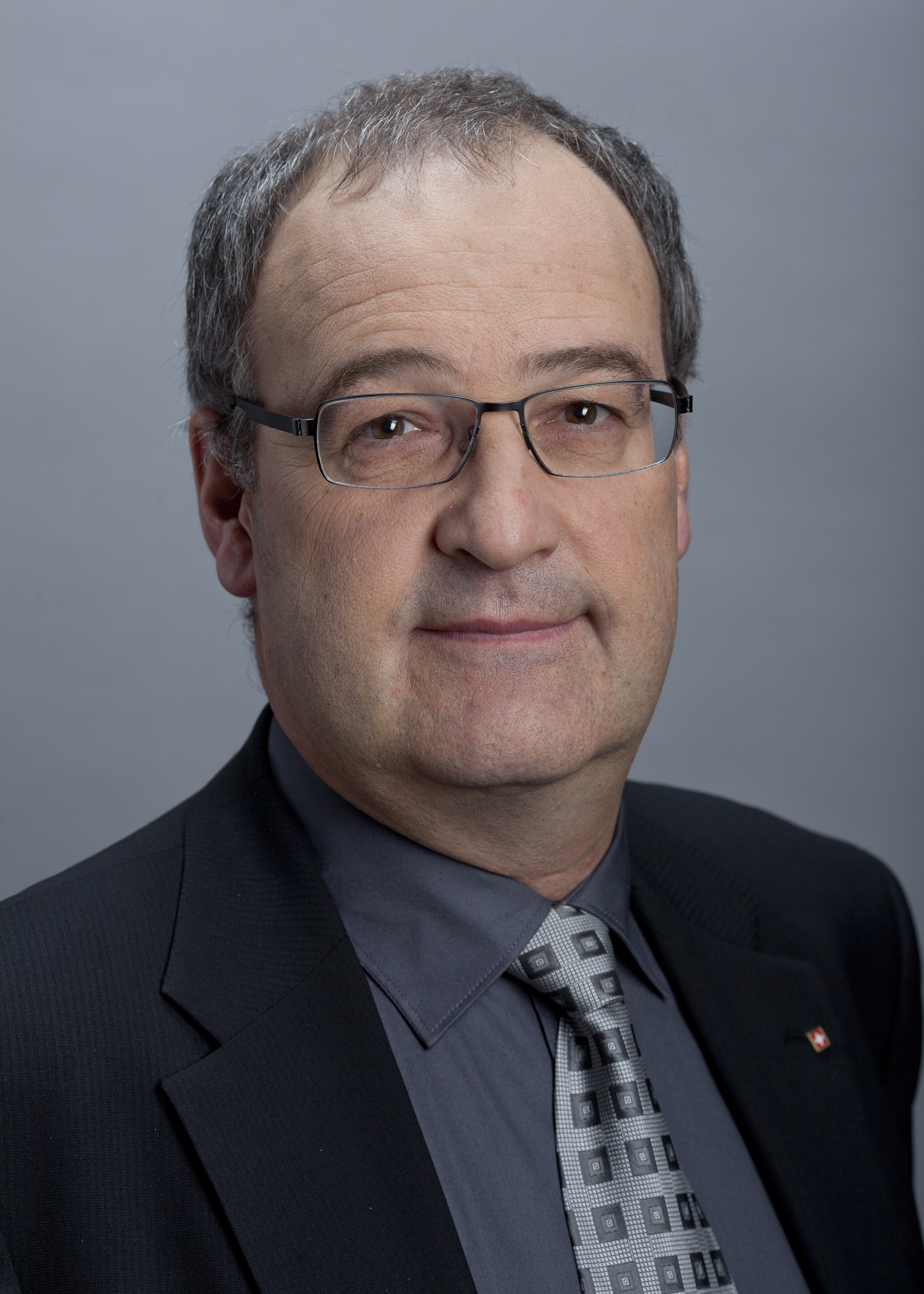
Federal Councillor Guy Parmelin

Guy Parmelin (SVP/UDC) was elected to the Federal Council after three rounds of voting.

	Round 1	Round 2	Round 3
Guy Parmelin	90	117	138
Thomas Aeschi	61	78	88
Norman Gobbi	50	30	11
Thomas Hurter	22	-	-
Viola Amherd	16	-	-
Votes received by other persons	4	14	-
Votes cast	245	244	243
Invalid votes	0	0	0
Blank votes	2	5	6
Valid votes	243	239	237
Absolute majority	122	120	119
