= Didier Burkhalter =

Swiss Federal Councillor from 2009 to 2017

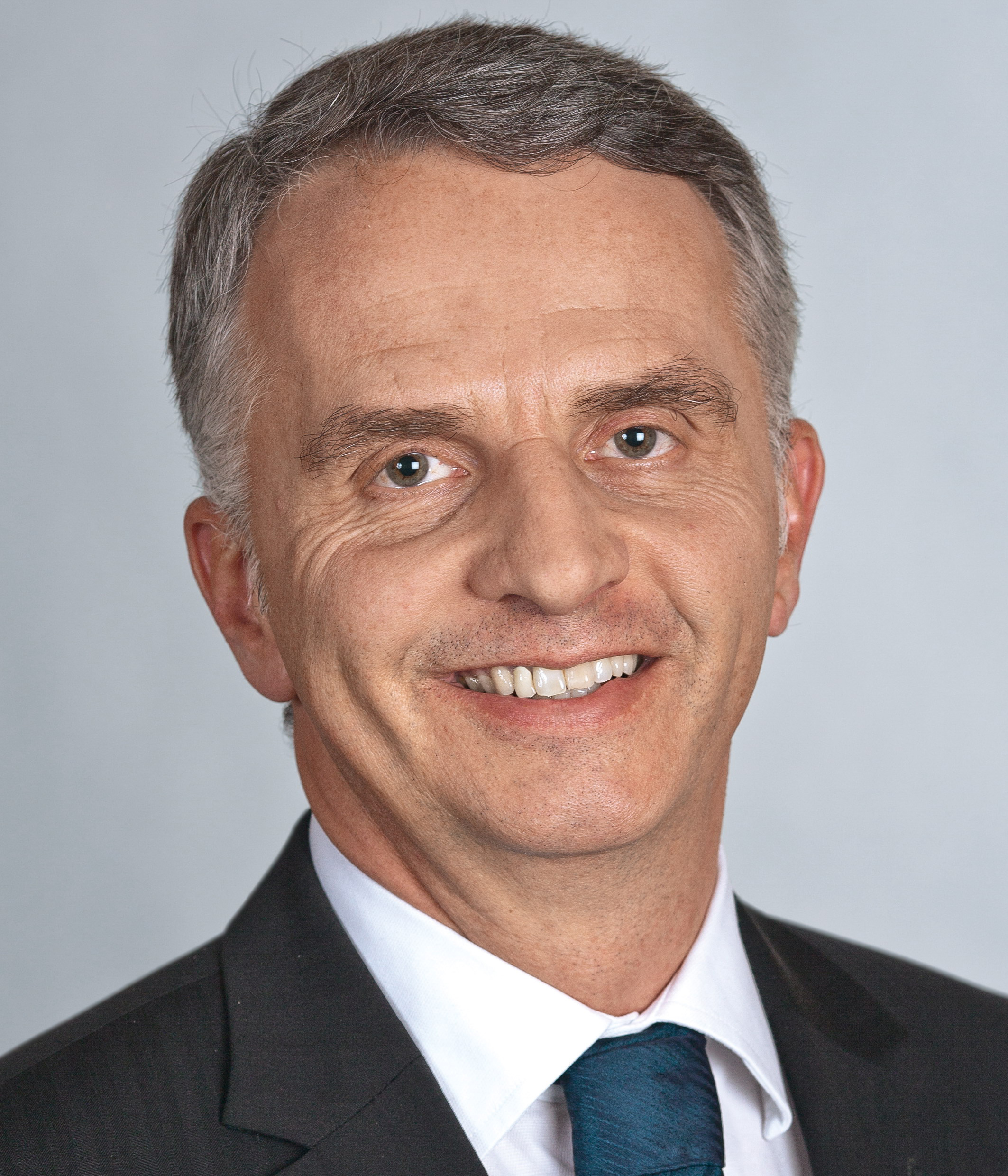
- Official portrait, 2011

Chair of the Organization for Security and Co-operation in Europe
- In office 1 January 2014 – 31 December 2014
- Preceded by: Leonid Kozhara
- Succeeded by: Ivica Dačić

President of Switzerland
- In office 1 January 2014 – 31 December 2014
- Vice President: Simonetta Sommaruga
- Preceded by: Ueli Maurer
- Succeeded by: Simonetta Sommaruga

Vice President of Switzerland
- In office 1 January 2013 – 31 December 2013
- President: Ueli Maurer
- Preceded by: Ueli Maurer
- Succeeded by: Simonetta Sommaruga

Head of the Department of Foreign Affairs
- In office 1 January 2012 – 31 October 2017
- Preceded by: Micheline Calmy-Rey
- Succeeded by: Ignazio Cassis

Head of the Department of Home Affairs
- In office 1 November 2009 – 31 December 2011
- Preceded by: Pascal Couchepin
- Succeeded by: Alain Berset

Member of the Swiss Federal Council
- In office 1 November 2009 – 31 October 2017
- Preceded by: Pascal Couchepin
- Succeeded by: Ignazio Cassis

Personal details
- Born: Didier Eric Burkhalter; 17 April 1960 (age 66) Auvernier, Switzerland
- Party: Free Democratic Party (until 2009); FDP.The Liberals (since 2009)
- Spouse: Friedrun Sabine Burkhalter (m. 1986)
- Children: 3
- Education: University of Neuchâtel

Didier Eric Burkhalter (born 17 April 1960) is a Swiss politician who served as a Member of the Swiss Federal Council from 2009 to 2017. A member of FDP.The Liberals, he was President of the Swiss Confederation in 2014.

Burkhalter was elected to the Swiss Federal Council on 16 September 2009; he succeeded Pascal Couchepin on 1 November 2009 when he became head of the Federal Department of Home Affairs. From 1 January 2012 to 31 October 2017, he served as head of the Federal Department of Foreign Affairs. As President of the Swiss Confederation, he served as Chairman-in-Office of the Organization for Security and Co-operation in Europe (OSCE) in 2014. He left the Federal Council on 31 October 2017.

== Biography ==
A native of Auvernier, Burkhalter served in the Grand Council of Neuchâtel from 1990 to 2001. From 1991 to 2005, he was a member of Neuchâtel's city government (Conseil communal); he was the Mayor of Neuchâtel several times (1994/1995, 1998/1998, 2001/2002). From 2003 to 2007, he was a member of the Swiss National Council. He was a member of the Free Democratic Party (FDP/PRD) until the foundation of FDP.The Liberals in 2009.

On 11 November 2007, Burkhalter was elected to the Council of States, along with Social Democratic Party (SP/PS) candidate Gisèle Ory, who was reelected for a second term. During the election campaign, he was backed by the Liberal Party (LPS/PLS) and the Swiss People's Party (SVP/UDC). Two years later, he was elected to the Swiss Federal Council.

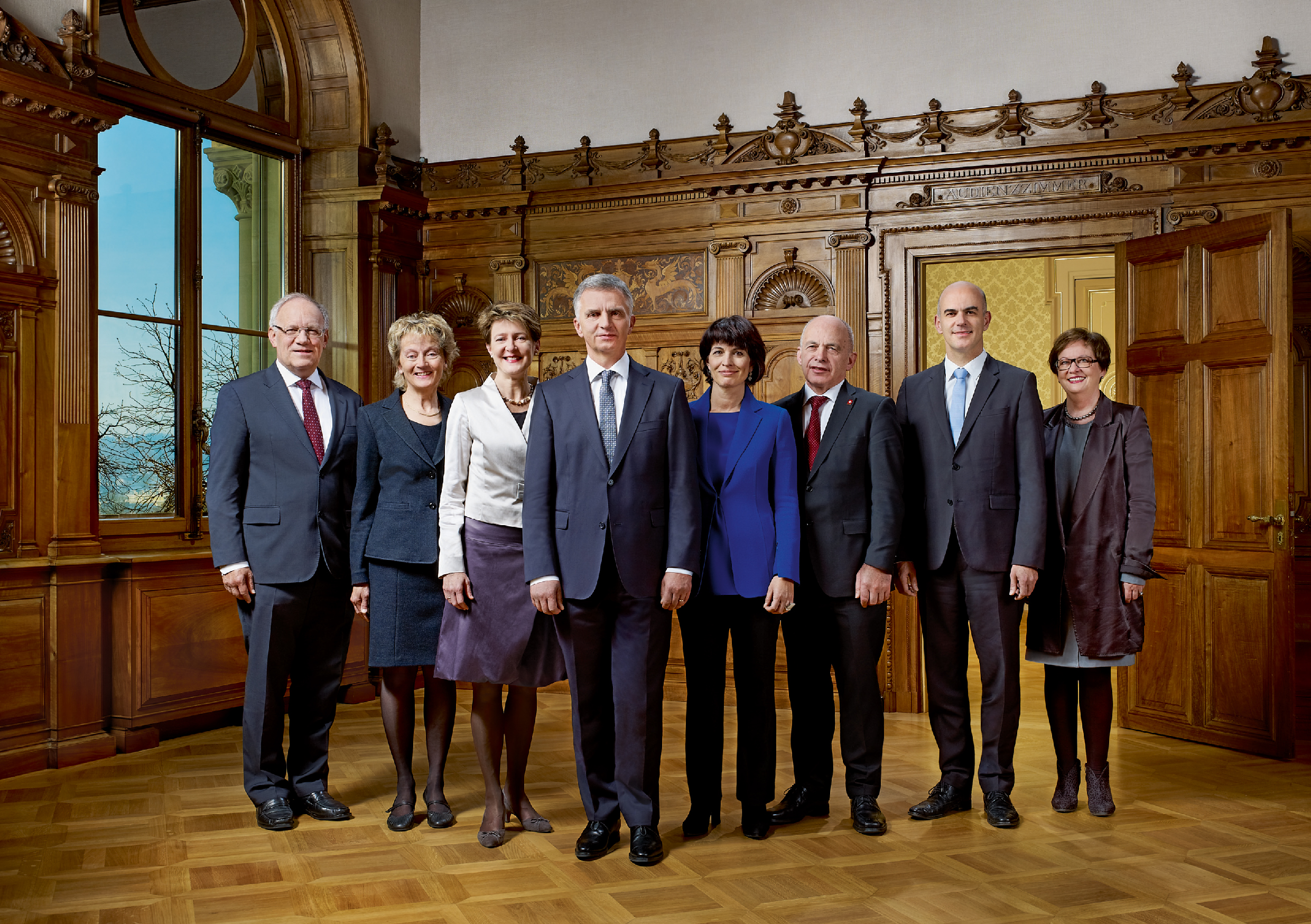
2014 Swiss Federal Council

On 4 December 2013, Burkhalter was elected as President of the Swiss Confederation for the 2014 term by taking 183 of the available 222 votes of the Federal Assembly.

On 1 January 2014, Burkhalter assumed the office as President of the Swiss Confederation. As President of the Confederation, he presided over meetings of the Federal Council and carried out representative functions that would normally be handled by a head of state in other democracies, though in Switzerland, the Federal Council as a whole is regarded as the head of state. He was also the highest-ranking official in the Swiss order of precedence and had the power to act on behalf of the whole Federal Council in emergency situations. However, in most cases, the officeholder is merely primus inter pares, with no powers over and above his six colleagues.

Burkhalter has a degree in Economics, is married to a native Austrian and the father of three children.

On 14 June 2017, Burkhalter published a letter in which he announced that he will be resigning as a Federal Councillor on 31 October 2017. He was succeeded by Ignazio Cassis. In April 2018, Burkhalter stated he disagreed with his colleagues on arms exports to war zones and equal pay for men and women, issues he described as "fundamental values."

== See also ==
- List of foreign ministers in 2017

Political offices
Preceded by Pascal Couchepin	Member of the Swiss Federal Council; 2009–2017	Succeeded by Ignazio Cassis
Preceded by Pascal Couchepin	Head of the Department of Home Affairs; 2009–2011	Succeeded by Alain Berset
Preceded by Micheline Calmy-Rey	Head of the Department of Foreign Affairs; 2012–2017	Succeeded by Ignazio Cassis
Preceded by Ueli Maurer	Vice President of Switzerland; 2013	Succeeded by Simonetta Sommaruga
Preceded by Ueli Maurer	President of Switzerland; 2014	Succeeded by Simonetta Sommaruga
