= Alain Berset =

Swiss Federal Councillor from 2012 to 2023

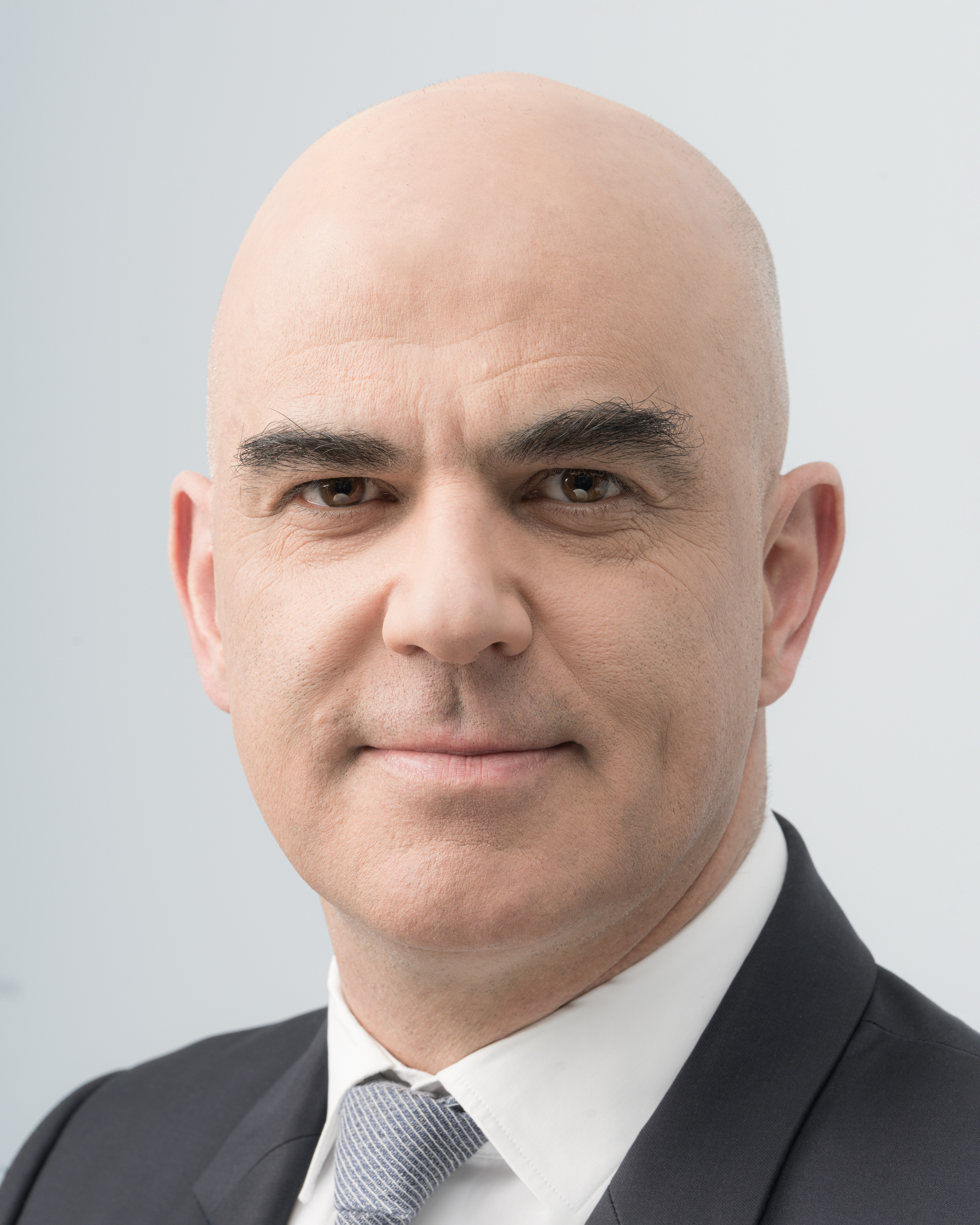
- Official portrait, 2023

Secretary General of the Council of Europe
- Incumbent
- Assumed office 18 September 2024
- Preceded by: Marija Pejčinović Burić

President of Switzerland
- In office 1 January 2023 – 31 December 2023
- Vice President: Viola Amherd
- Preceded by: Ignazio Cassis
- Succeeded by: Viola Amherd
- In office 1 January 2018 – 31 December 2018
- Vice President: Ueli Maurer
- Preceded by: Doris Leuthard
- Succeeded by: Ueli Maurer

Vice President of Switzerland
- In office 1 January 2022 – 31 December 2022
- President: Ignazio Cassis
- Preceded by: Ignazio Cassis
- Succeeded by: Viola Amherd
- In office 1 January 2017 – 31 December 2017
- President: Doris Leuthard
- Preceded by: Doris Leuthard
- Succeeded by: Ueli Maurer

Swiss Federal Councillor
- In office 1 January 2012 – 31 December 2023
- Department: Home Affairs
- Preceded by: Micheline Calmy-Rey
- Succeeded by: Beat Jans

President of the Council of States
- In office 1 December 2008 – 23 November 2009
- Preceded by: Christoffel Brändli
- Succeeded by: Erika Forster-Vannini

Personal details
- Born: 9 April 1972 (age 54) Fribourg, Switzerland
- Party: Social Democratic Party
- Spouse: Muriel Zeender (m. 2002)
- Children: 3
- Education: University of Neuchâtel (BA, MA, PhD)
- Website: alainberset.ch parlament.ch/de/biografie/alain-berset/1161

Alain Berset (French pronunciation: [alɛ̃ bɛʁsɛ]; born 9 April 1972) is a Swiss politician and economist who served as a Member of the Swiss Federal Council from 2012 to 2023. A member of the Social Democratic Party (SP/PS), he headed the Federal Department of Home Affairs from when he took office. Berset served as President of the Swiss Confederation for 2018 and 2023.

On 25 June 2024, Berset was elected Secretary General of the Council of Europe, and assumed his role on 18 September 2024 succeeding Marija Pejčinović Burić.

== Personal life ==
Berset was born in Fribourg on 9 April 1972, the elder of two children, to Michel Berset, a teacher at the commercial and industrial school of Fribourg, and Solange Berset (née Angéloz; b. 1952), a bookseller. He was raised in a political family. His maternal grandfather, François Angéloz, was among the first municipal presidents of the Social Democratic Party, in the predominantly conservative Fribourg.

Berset speaks French, German, Romansh, Italian and English fluently.

Berset studied political science and economics at the University of Neuchâtel, where he received a master's degree in political science in 1996 and a PhD in economics in 2005 with a dissertation about the role of international migration upon local working conditions.

Berset is married to Muriel Zeender Berset and is the father of three children. The family lives in Belfaux, a village near Fribourg.

== Career ==
=== Early career ===
Berset worked as an assistant lecturer and researcher at the Institute for Regional Economics of the University of Neuchâtel from 1996 till 2000, when he moved to the Hamburg Institute for Economic Research for a year. In 2000 he became a member of the Constituent Assembly of the canton of Fribourg and president of its social democrat parliamentary group until 2004. He also served on the Belfaux communal parliament from 2001 to 2003. In 2002, he became a strategic consultant to the Department of Economic Affairs of the canton of Neuchâtel.

=== Member of the Council of States ===
In 2003 he was elected to the Swiss Council of States from the canton of Fribourg as a member of the Social Democratic Party becoming the youngest member of the Council of States, as well as the party's parliamentary group's vice president in December 2005. He was also a member of the parliamentary assembly of the Organization for Security and Co-operation in Europe (OSCE). Following his reelection in 2007, he was elected the States Council's vice president in 2007–2008; he subsequently served as the body's president in 2008–2009.

=== Member of the Federal Council ===
On 14 December 2011, he was elected to the Swiss Federal Council, the seven-member Swiss federal government, with 126 votes out of 245. He was one of the Social Democratic Party's two candidates (alongside Pierre-Yves Maillard) officially put forward to succeed the head of the Federal Department of Foreign Affairs, Micheline Calmy-Rey, who had announced her resignation from the Federal Council. Berset became head of the Federal Department of Home Affairs as its former head Didier Burkhalter became head of the Federal Department of Foreign Affairs.

On 1 January 2017, Berset became Vice-President of the Federal Council under President Doris Leuthard.

=== President of the Federal Council (2018) ===
2018 Swiss Federal Council

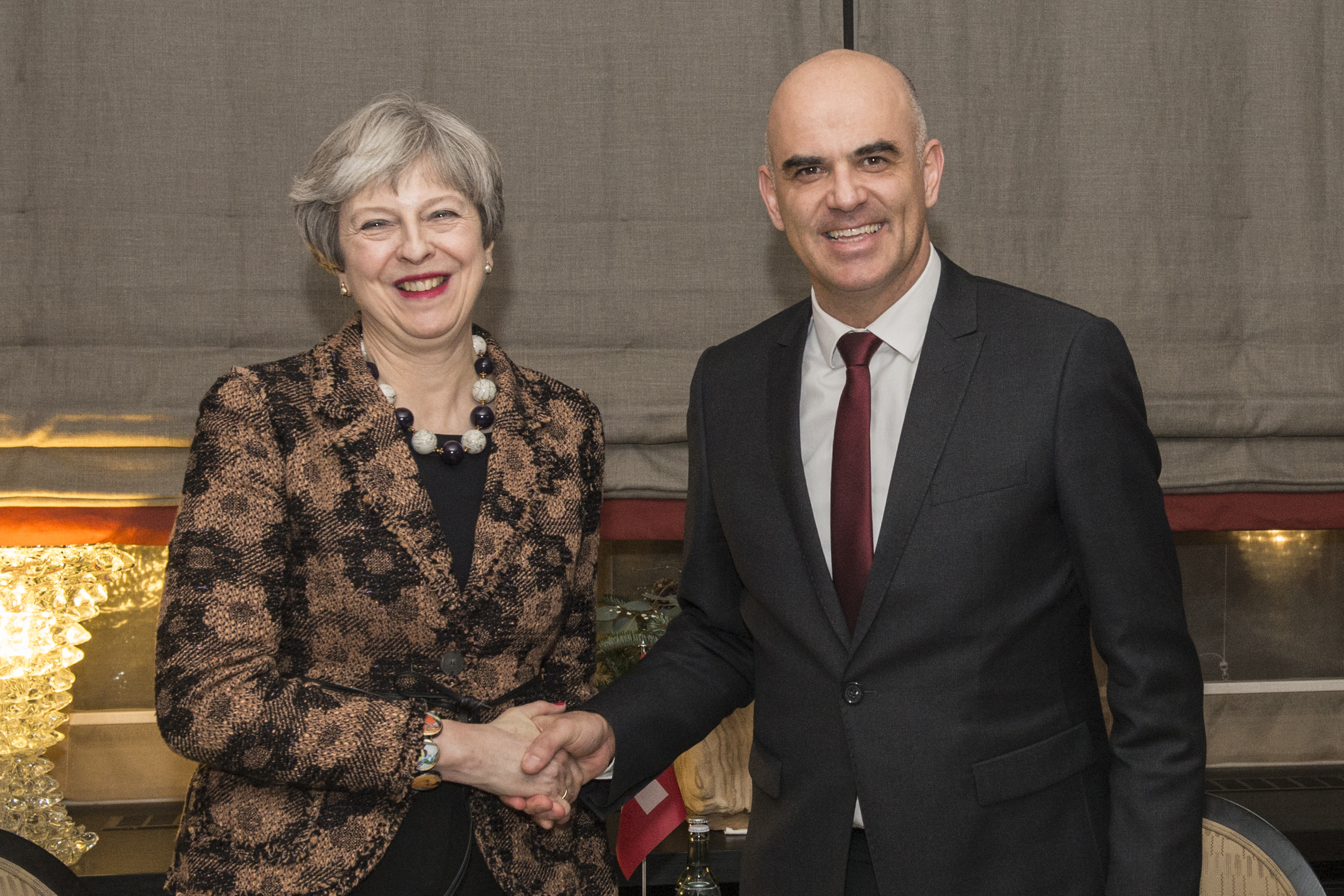
Berset with British Prime Minister Theresa May in Davos in 2018

Berset became President on 1 January 2018. He left the presidency on 31 December 2018. He was succeeded by Ueli Maurer.

At age 45, he was the youngest officeholder since Marcel Pilet-Golaz in 1934.

=== Secretary of Home Affairs ===
During the COVID-19 pandemic in Switzerland, as head of the Federal Department of Home Affairs, he was one of the leading figures in the government's response to the crisis. Following an interview with Berset, Schweizer Radio und Fernsehen (SRF) wrote, "there were moments during the first wave when he no longer knew whether it was day or night, weekday or weekend. He said he had never experienced anything like that before".

On 1 January 2022, Berset became again Vice-President of the Federal Council, under President Ignazio Cassis.

=== President of the Federal Council (2023) ===
On 7 December 2022, he was elected President, succeeding Cassis on 1 January 2023.

On 21 June 2023, he announced in a press conference that he would not run for re-election as a member of the Federal Council in the election on 13 December 2023. He left office on 31 December 2023, He was succeeded by Beat Jans.

=== Secretary-General of the Council of Europe (2024–present) ===
In January 2024, Berset became the Swiss government's candidate to succeed Marija Pejčinović Burić as Secretary General of the Council of Europe, competing with Didier Reynders and Indrek Saar.

On 25 June 2024, Berset was elected Secretary General of the Council of Europe, to succeed Marija Pejčinović Burić. He defeated Belgian candidate Didier Reynders and Estonian candidate Indrek Saar.

He took office on 18 September 2024.

=== Blackmail affair ===
On 21 November 2020, the weekly Die Weltwoche revealed, from the pen of the former Zürich SVP/UDC national councillor Christoph Mörgeli, that Berset was the victim of an attempted blackmail the previous year. A woman, since convicted in criminal proceedings, allegedly tried to extort 100,000 Swiss francs from him by threatening to publish photographs and private messages that they had exchanged. The political world seized the case; the Supervisory Authority of the Public Ministry of the Confederation (MPC) opened an investigation to verify that the Federal Councillor did not benefit from favours in the treatment of his complaint.

In September 2021, while the health policy followed by the Federal Council to overcome the COVID-19 pandemic was contested and Alain Berset criticized, the case bounced back: a controversy broke out over the use of a vehicle of representation during an escapade with the woman, on the use of state collaborators to settle the attempt of blackmail, in particular by sending the Task Force TIGRIS of the Federal Office of Police at the home of the woman concerned, as well as on the limits between respect for the private life invoked by the magistrate and the public interest.

On 14 June 2022, Berset was cleared in a parliamentary investigation into the alleged abuse of state resources.

=== Aerial interception in France ===
On 5 July 2022 Berset entered the restricted airspace approximately ten kilometres south of Avord Air Base in France. His Cessna 182 was then intercepted by two Rafale fighter jets of the French Air Force who forced him to land. Berset's statements to the press described the interception as a "private affair". He was at the time the President of Switzerland. This was the first time that an aerial interception in France involved a sitting member of a government.

== Works ==
Berset is the author of several books and some 30 articles on economic development, migration, and regional development.

== Notes and references ==
Political offices
Preceded by Christoffel Brändli	President of the Council of States; 2008–2009	Succeeded by Erika Forster-Vannini
Preceded by Micheline Calmy-Rey	Member of the Swiss Federal Council; 2012–2023	Succeeded by Beat Jans
Preceded by Didier Burkhalter	Head of the Department of Home Affairs; 2012–2024	Succeeded by Élisabeth Baume-Schneider
Preceded by Doris Leuthard	Vice President of Switzerland; 2017	Succeeded by Ueli Maurer
Preceded by Doris Leuthard	President of Switzerland; 2018	Succeeded by Ueli Maurer
Preceded by Ignazio Cassis	Vice President of Switzerland; 2022	Succeeded by Viola Amherd
Preceded by Ignazio Cassis	President of Switzerland; 2023	Succeeded by Viola Amherd
