= Schwaller =

Schwaller is a surname. Notable people with the surname include:

- Andreas Schwaller (born 1970), Swiss curler
- Christof Schwaller (born 1966), Swiss curler
- Heike Schwaller (born 1968), Swiss curler
- Kim Schwaller (born 2003), Swiss curler
- Yannick Schwaller (born 1995), Swiss curler
- Urs Schwaller (born 1952), Swiss politician
- R. A. Schwaller de Lubicz (1887–1961), Alsatian scholar and writer
