= 2009 Swiss Federal Council election =

← 2008	16 September 2009	2010 →
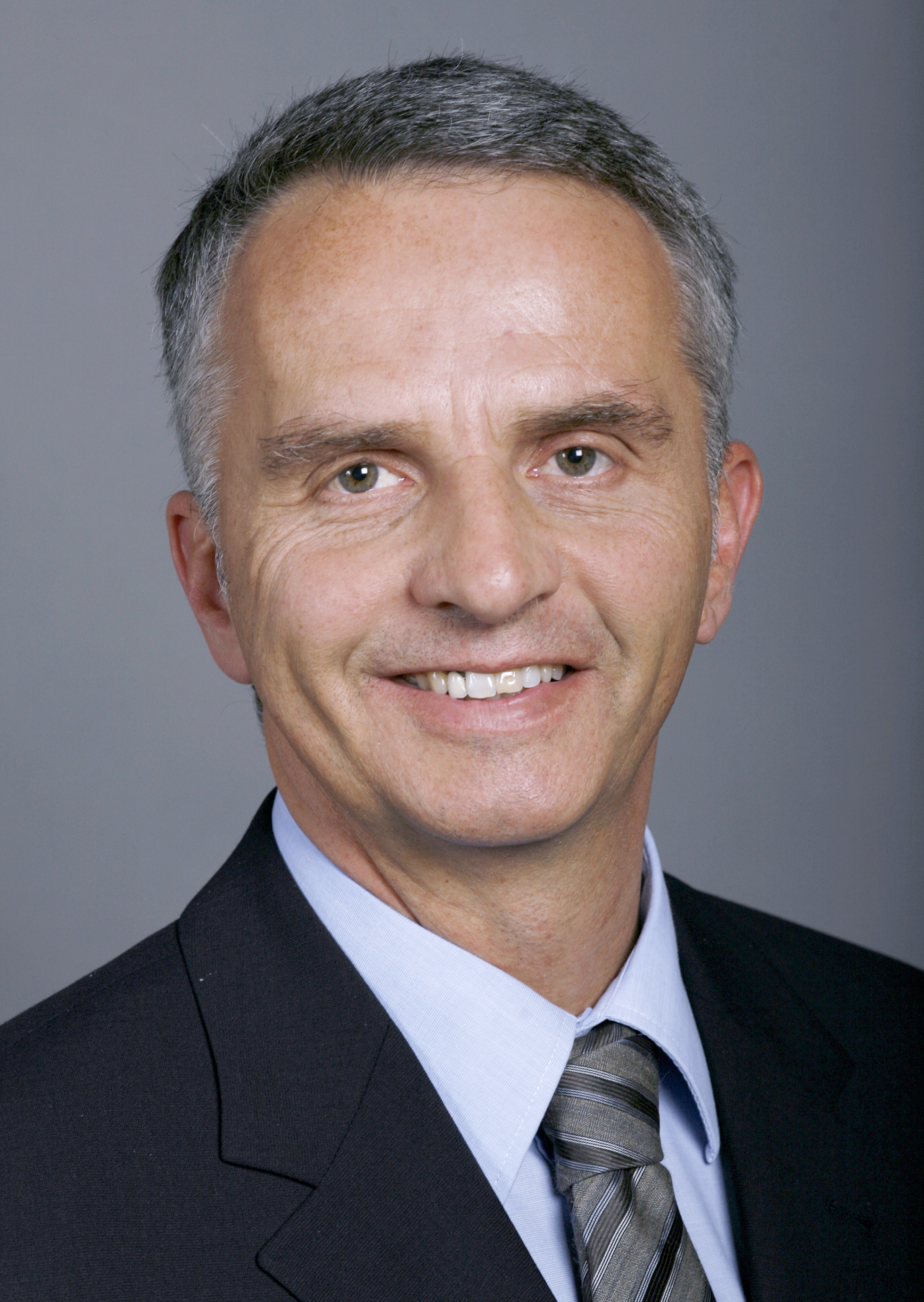

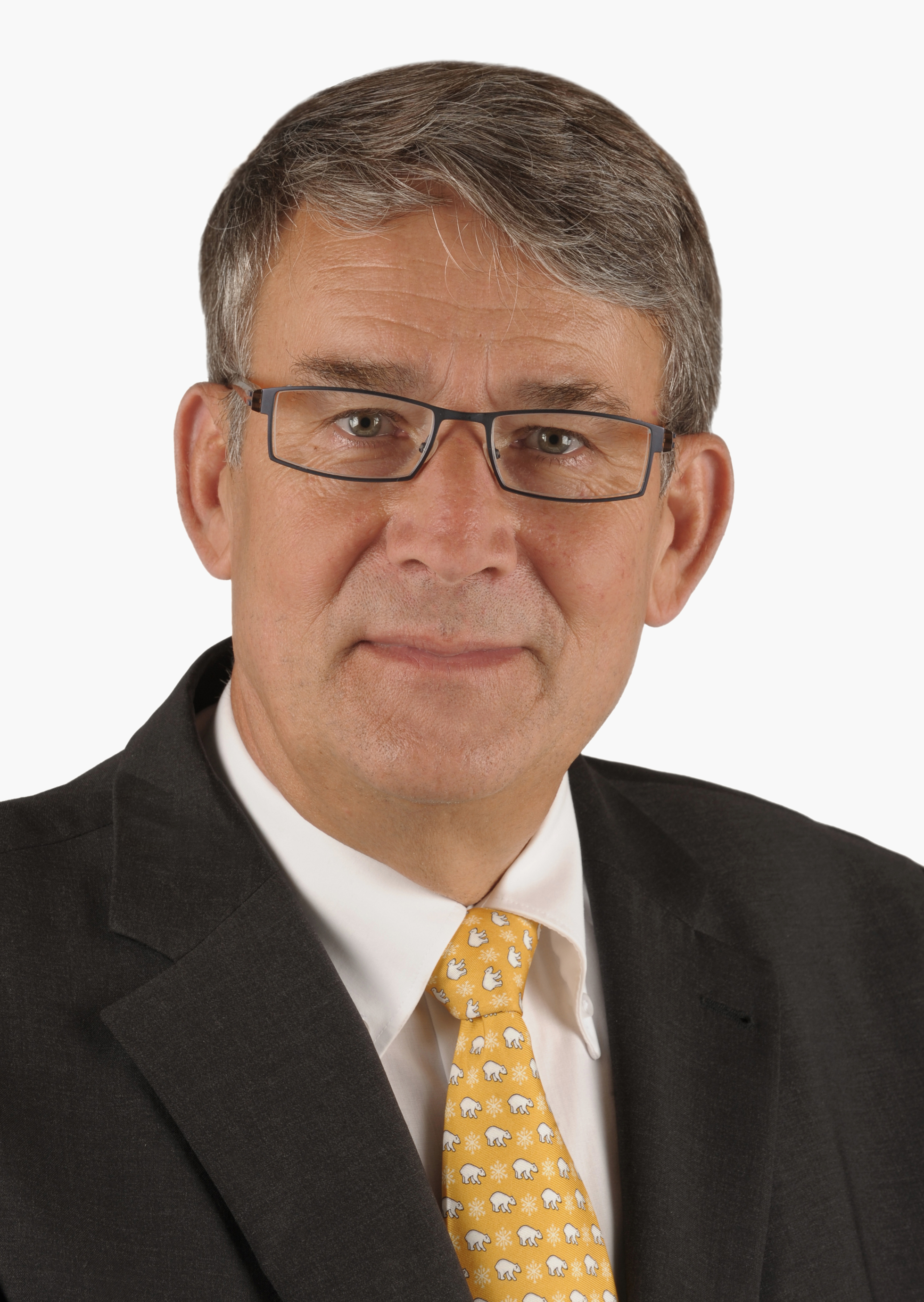

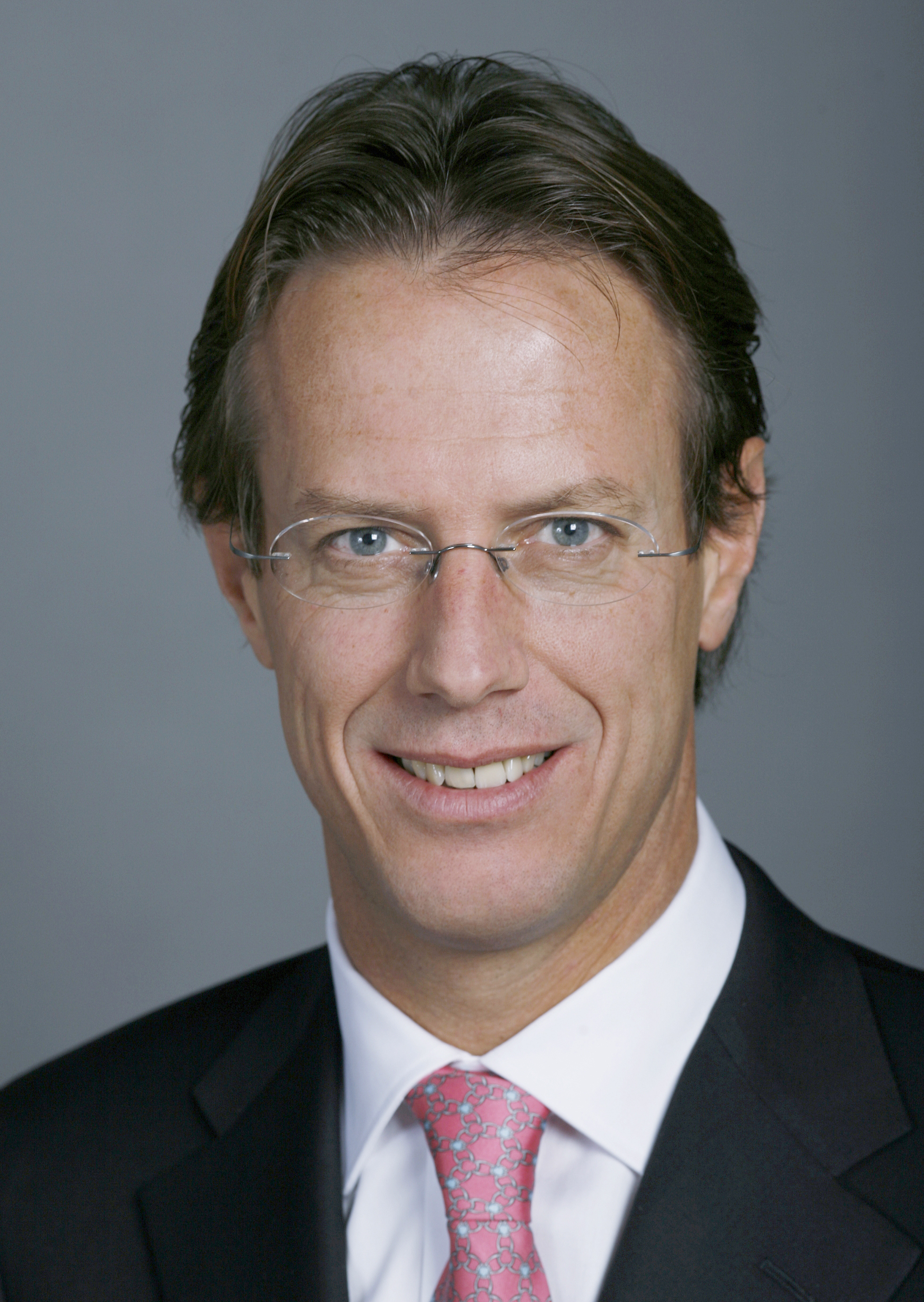
Nominee	Didier Burkhalter	Urs Schwaller	Christian Lüscher
Party	Free Democrats	Christian Democrats	Free Democrats
Electoral vote	129	106	4
Federal Councillor before election
Pascal Couchepin
Free Democrats
Elected Federal Councillor
Didier Burkhalter
Free Democrats

A by-election to the Swiss Federal Council was held in Switzerland on 16 September 2009, after incumbent Federal Councillor Pascal Couchepin (Free Democratic Party, FDP/PLR) announced his intention to retire on 31 October 2009.

Some saw the election as an important decision regarding whom the "fourth seat" in the Federal Council belonged to (the FDP or the CVP), and as an indirect political decision regarding whether the SP or the SVP would have more influence in the future.

Didier Burkhalter (FDP/PLR) was elected to succeed Couchepin in the fourth ballot.

== Candidates and party positions ==
The election became a contest between the center-right Free Democrats and the centrist Christian Democrats, who both claimed to be entitled to the free Council seat. The right-wing Swiss People's Party and the left-wing Social Democratic Party's support, however, will decide the outcome.

=== Free Democratic Party ===
The FDP entered the election trying to retain Pascal Couchepin's seat. Representative Didier Burkhalter (Neuchâtel) announced his candidacy on 8 July 2009, followed by the Genevan representatives Christian Lüscher on 9 July and Martine Brunschwig Graf on 12 July, as well as Pascal Broulis (Vaud) on 6 August. Party president Fulvio Pelli, while not officially putting himself forward, stated that he would stand in the election if nominated by his party.

The FDP decided on 29 August to nominate two candidates, Burkhalter and Lüscher. Lüscher was seen as a right-wing candidate and Burkhalter as a centrist; some speculated that the FDP had nominated Lüscher to appease the SVP, while wanting Burkhalter to be elected. This strategy was considered to be risky, however, as a final vote between the FDP's Lüscher and the CVP's Schwaller would likely see Schwaller's election. The FDP claimed that Lüscher was not at all meant as an appeasement, and that he was as legitimate a candidate as Burkhalter.

Shortly before the election, Dick Marty (FDP Ticino) announced without the support of his party that he would accept an election; it was seen as possible that some SP and Green representatives might support him.

=== Christian Democratic Party ===
The Christian Democratic People's Party (CVP/PDC) also stated it was entitled to a second seat. Dominique de Buman from the CVP Fribourg announced his candidacy on 7 August 2009. Urs Schwaller (CVP Fribourg) will also stand. Furthermore, Luigi Pedrazzini (CVP Ticino) was nominated on 31 August 2009. On 8 September 2009, the CVP unanimously nominated Schwaller.

=== Swiss People's Party ===
The Swiss People's Party (SVP/UDC) maintained that it was entitled to a second seat on the Federal Council, but that it had not yet decided when to try and obtain it. The SVP announced that it would only support the FDP's candidate if the FDP agreed to a fixed timetable for the election of a second SVP councilor. The SVP was strongly considering proposing their own candidate, with Jean-François Rime (SVP Fribourg) the only likely candidate; if they do not propose their own candidate, they stated they would only vote for FDP candidates, as they do not recognize the CVP's claim to a second seat.

=== Social Democratic Party ===
SP representatives stated that they would consider the candidates of CVP and FDP on their own merits, as they don't see either of the two parties having a natural claim to the seat; supporting the Greens was seen as unlikely, but possible. The FDP's Pelli was the only candidate the SP ruled out supporting. Analysts stated the SP had to take into account that it would likely shortly have to replace Moritz Leuenberger's seat, and that it couldn't risk alienating the FDP too strongly. The SVP almost directly threatened it might vote against the SP's second candidate and for a Green candidate in the next complete renewal of the Federal Council in 2011. Shortly before the election, the SP declared that it was not decided that its members would prefer Schwaller; while he was closer to the SP on the issues, some members of the SP were reluctant to vote for a non-FDP candidate on institutional grounds. The SP also stated it would openly announce its voting behaviour (likely in an attempt to show that some SVP members – likely from constituencies strongly influenced by the farming community – would vote for Schwaller, who had tried to raise his profile as a critic of agricultural free trade with the EU).

=== Greens ===
The Greens decided on 28 August not to propose a candidate for the seat, as they had done in the two previous elections when SVP seats were contested, because they considered the time not to be right.

=== Conservative Democrats ===
The small Conservative Democratic Party (BDP) stated that if any agreement to replace Eveline Widmer-Schlumpf with a SVP representative came to pass, the party would vote for the CVP's candidate. Furthermore, the BDP proposed giving the BDP's votes to the CVP candidate in exchange for the CVP's support for Widmer-Schlumpf's reelection in 2011.

== Procedure ==
Federal Council elections proceed in as many ballots as are required for a candidate to receive an absolute majority of valid votes. Each of the 246 members of the Federal Assembly, members of the National Council and the Council of States alike, hold one vote. Article 132, par. 3 and 4 of the Parliament Act provides that:

^{3} In the first two ballots, any person who is eligible for election may be voted for. From the third ballot onwards, no additional candidatures are permitted. ^{4} Excluded from the election are:
a. those who obtain fewer than ten votes from the second ballot onwards; and
b. the person who receives the lowest number of votes from the third ballot onwards, unless more than one person receives this same number of votes.

== Results ==
Candidates		Ballot 1	Ballot 2	Ballot 3	Ballot 4
Didier Burkhalter	Didier Burkhalter	58	72	80	129
Christian Lüscher	Christian Lüscher	73	72	63	(4)
Dick Marty	Dick Marty	34	(12)	(5)	—
Urs Schwaller	Urs Schwaller	79	89	95	106
Other persons		1	0	0	0
Votes cast		245	245	243	245
Invalid votes		0	0	0	1
Blank votes		0	0	0	5
Valid votes		245	245	243	239
Absolute majority		123	123	122	120

After the first ballot, Dick Marty asked his colleagues, in a personal statement, to support his party's official candidates. After the third ballot, Christian Lüscher asked his colleagues to support Didier Burkhalter. Didier Burkhalter accepted his election to Federal Councillor.
