= Johann Schneider-Ammann =

Swiss Federal Councillor from 2010 to 2018

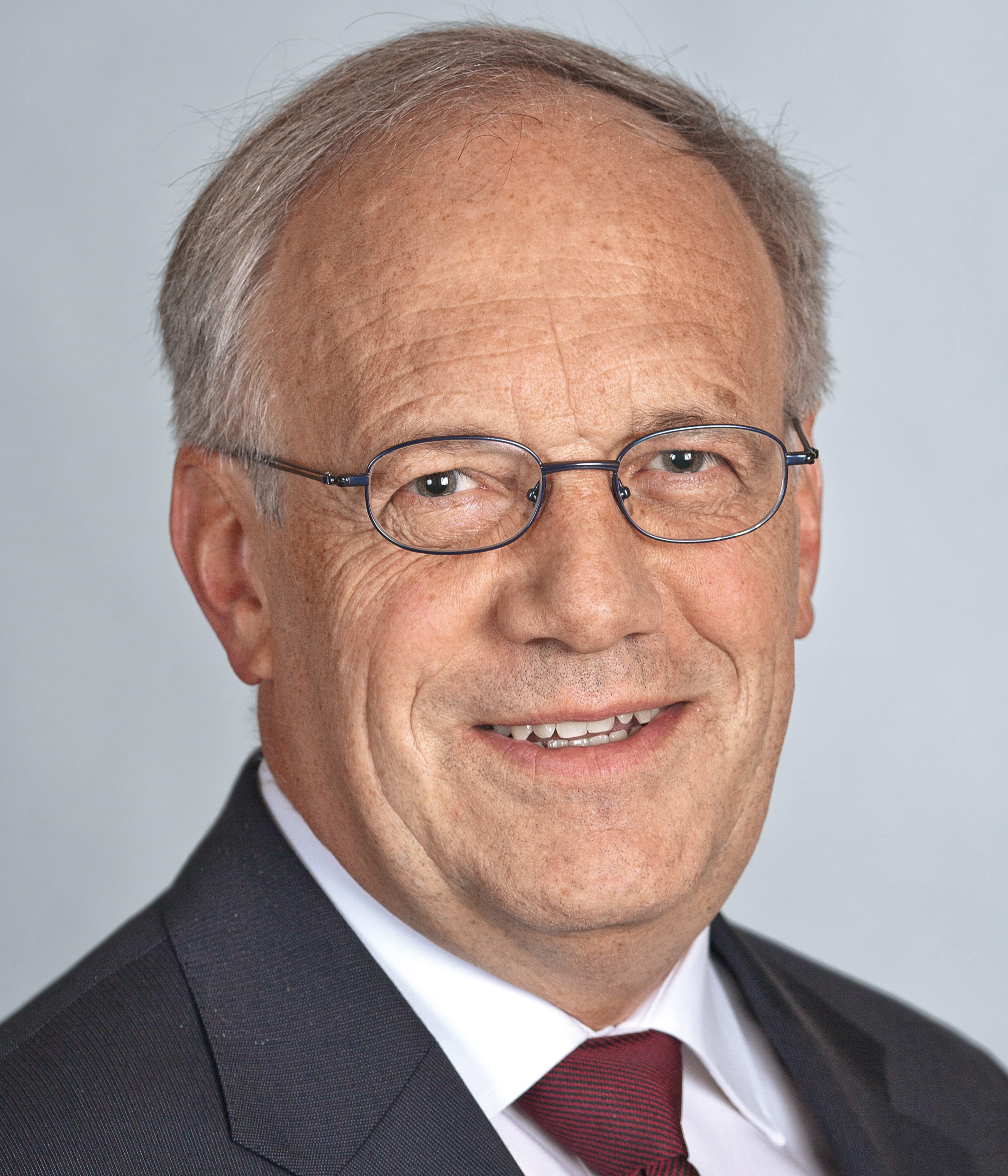
- Official portrait, 2011

President of Switzerland
- In office 1 January 2016 – 31 December 2016
- Vice President: Doris Leuthard
- Preceded by: Simonetta Sommaruga
- Succeeded by: Doris Leuthard

Vice President of Switzerland
- In office 1 January 2015 – 31 December 2015
- President: Simonetta Sommaruga
- Preceded by: Simonetta Sommaruga
- Succeeded by: Doris Leuthard

Head of the Department of Economic Affairs, Education and Research
- In office 1 November 2010 – 31 December 2018
- Preceded by: Doris Leuthard
- Succeeded by: Guy Parmelin

Member of the Swiss Federal Council
- In office 1 November 2010 – 31 December 2018
- Preceded by: Hans-Rudolf Merz
- Succeeded by: Karin Keller-Sutter

Personal details
- Born: Johann Niklaus Schneider; 18 February 1952 (age 74) Sumiswald, Switzerland
- Party: FDP. The Liberals (since 2009)
- Other political affiliations: Free Democratic Party (until 2009)
- Spouse: Katharina Ammann (m. 1978)
- Relations: Ulrich Ammann (father-in-law)
- Children: 2
- Education: ETH Zürich; INSEAD

Johann Niklaus Schneider, colloquially Johann Schneider-Ammann (born 18 February 1952), is a Swiss businessman, electrical engineer and politician who most notably served as President of Switzerland in 2016, and concurrently as a member of the Federal Council (Switzerland) for The Liberals.

During his tenure as a federal councillor, Schneider-Ammann headed the Federal Department of Economic Affairs, Education and Research. The Schneider-Ammann family is among the richest Swiss citizens with an estimated net worth of 650 million Swiss Francs (approximately $725 million in 2024) by Handelszeitung.

== Early life and education ==
Schneider was born 18 February 1952 in Sumiswald, Switzerland, one of five children, to Ernst Schneider, a veterinarian, and Elisabeth Schneider (née Hofmann). He was raised in the Emmental and attended local schools.

He attended the Gymnasium in Langenthal where he graduated with his Matura in 1972. Schneider graduated as an electrical engineer from the ETH Zürich in 1977 and obtained a Master of Business Administration from INSEAD in France in 1983.

== Professional career ==
Schneider-Ammann started his professional career at Oerlikon-Bührle where he was a project manager from 1978 to 1981. He then entered the family business of his in-laws, Ammann Group, in Langenthal in 1984.

From 1990 to 2010, he served as president and chairman of Ammann Group, in the fourth generation, when he passed control over the company to his two children.

== Political career ==
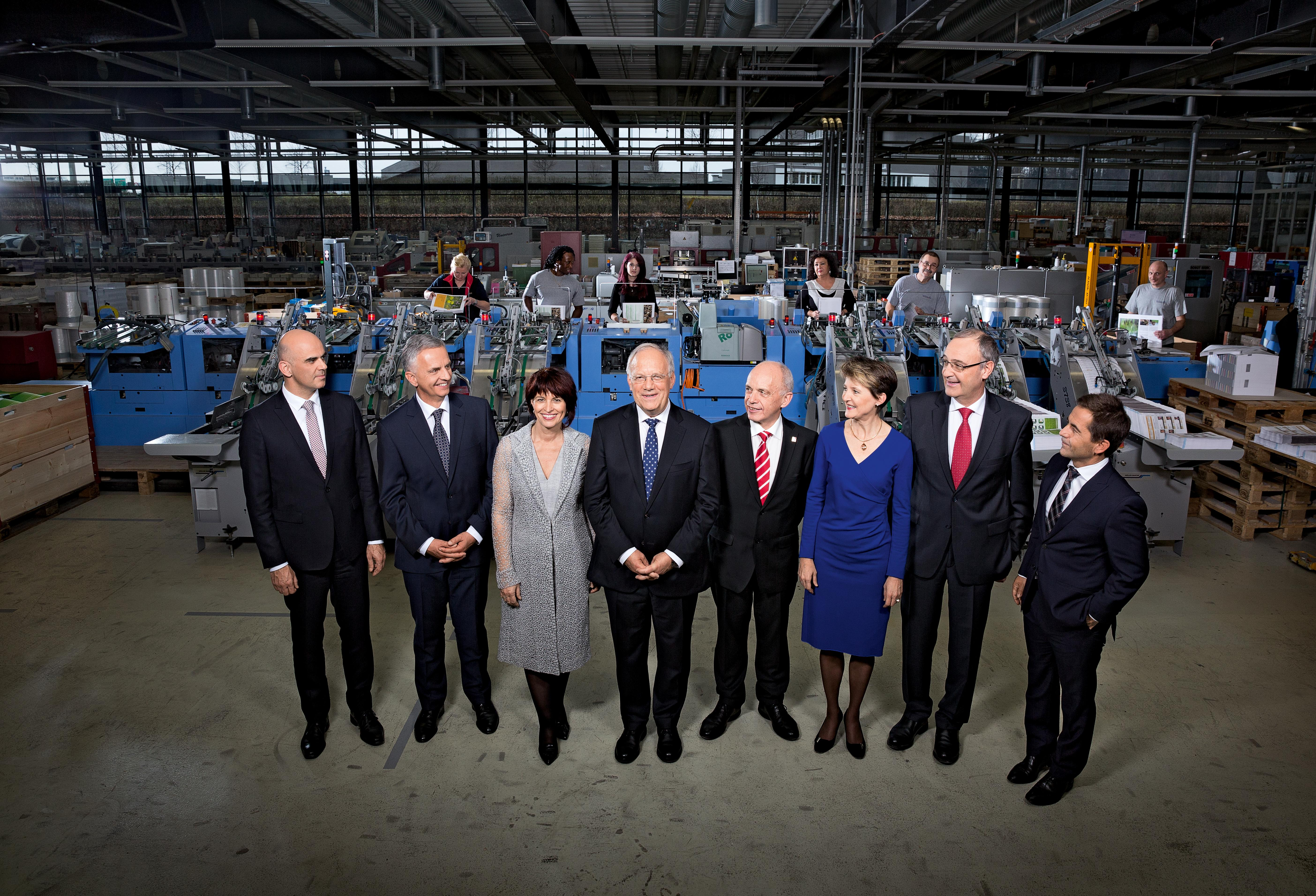
2016 Swiss Federal Council

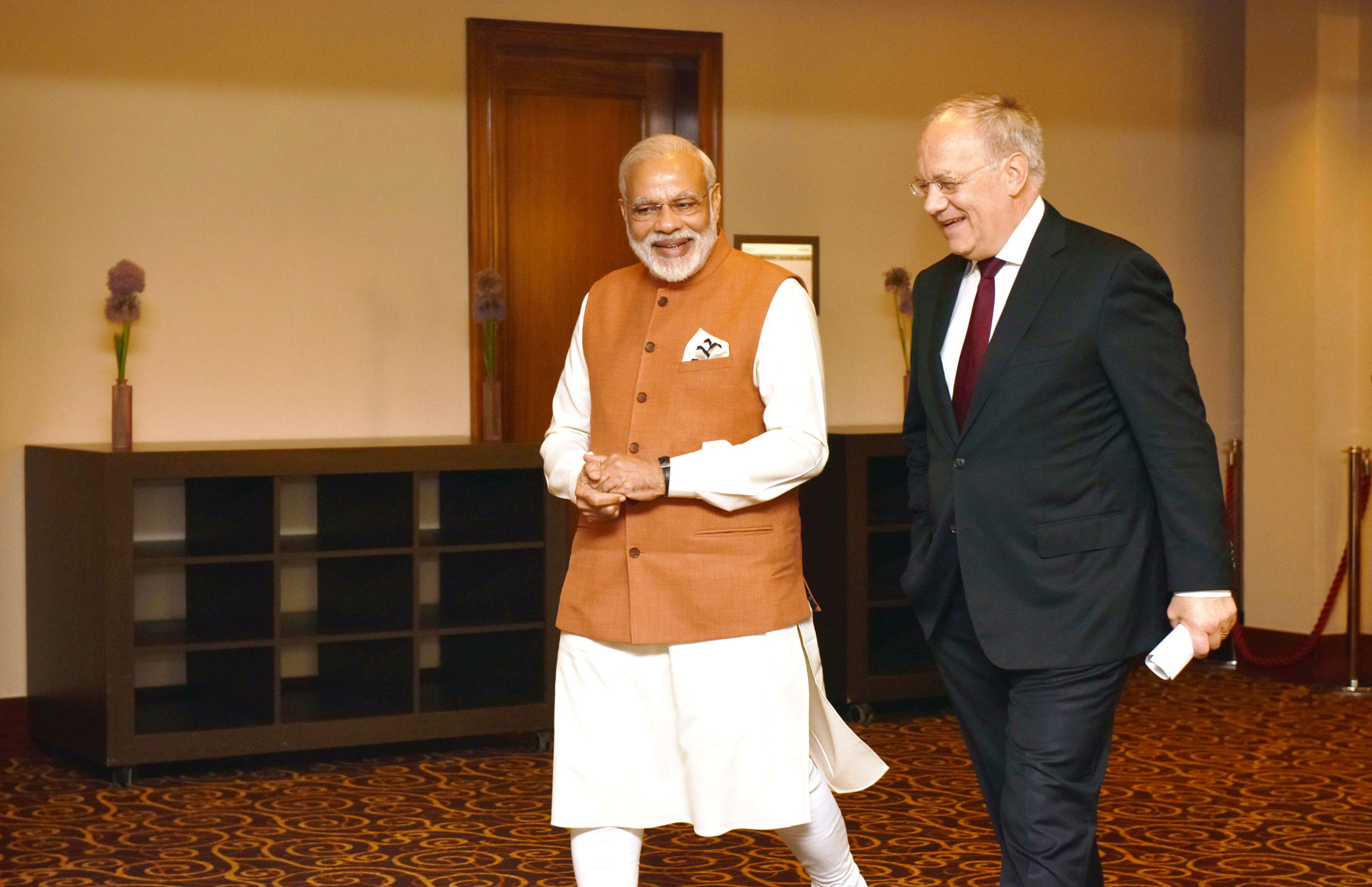
Schneider-Ammann with Indian Prime Minister Narendra Modi in Geneva in 2016

In the 1999 federal election, Schneider-Ammann was elected to the Swiss National Council for the canton of Bern as a member of the Free Democratic Party (FDP/PRD). From 1999, he also chaired the corporate union Swissmem. He was reelected to the National Council in 2003 and 2007. In the context of the 2008 financial crisis, Schneider-Ammann took a critical stance on bonuses awarded to the finance industry. However, Schneider-Ammann's company moved substantial funds to a Jersey, a tax haven, the same year.

In 2009, Schneider-Ammann became a member of the newly-established FDP.The Liberals. In the 2010 election, he was elected to the Swiss Federal Council as Hans-Rudolf Merz's successor. He took office on 1 November 2010 as the head of the Federal Department of Economic Affairs, which became the Federal Department of Economic Affairs, Education and Research in 2013. He had previously announced his intention to step down from his corporate responsibilities as well as various board memberships if elected.

In 2015, he took office as Vice President of Switzerland under President Simonetta Sommaruga. He was inaugurated as President of the Swiss Confederation on 1 January 2016 along Vice President Doris Leuthard. In March 2016, he became an Internet meme after a speech on laughter that many deemed sad. On 1 June 2016, as President of Switzerland, Schneider-Ammann was present at the official opening of the Gotthard Base Tunnel, which became the world's longest railway tunnel, alongside German Chancellor Angela Merkel, French President François Hollande and Italian Prime Minister Matteo Renzi among others.

On 31 December 2018, Schneider-Ammann left the Federal Council; he was replaced by Karin Keller-Sutter on 1 January 2019.

== Personal life ==
In 1978, Schneider married Katharina Ammann, a veterinarian, the only daughter of Ulrich Ammann (1921–2006), president and majority shareholder of Ammann Group, and Katharina Ammann (née Schellenberg). They have two children;

- Hans-Christian Schneider (born 1979)
- Daniela Schneider (born 1981), married Aeschlimann

Schneider-Ammann resides in Langenthal, Switzerland.

== Other activities ==
- Asian Infrastructure Investment Bank (AIIB), Ex-Officio Member of the Board of Governors
- European Bank for Reconstruction and Development (EBRD), Ex-Officio Member of the Board of Governors
- Joint World Bank-IMF Development Committee, Member

== Notes and references ==
Political offices
Preceded by Hans-Rudolf Merz	Member of the Swiss Federal Council; 2010–2018	Succeeded by Karin Keller-Sutter
Preceded by Doris Leuthard	Head of the Department of Economic Affairs, Education and Research; 2010–2018	Succeeded by Guy Parmelin
Preceded by Simonetta Sommaruga	Vice President of Switzerland; 2015	Succeeded by Doris Leuthard
Preceded by Simonetta Sommaruga	President of Switzerland; 2016	Succeeded by Doris Leuthard
