= List of mayors of Neuchâtel =

This is a list of mayors of the city of Neuchâtel, Switzerland. The executive of the city of Neuchâtel is its Conseil communal. Its annual presiding member is the Président du Conseil communal.

Claude Frey was mayor in 1977/1978, 1982/1983, 1986/1987

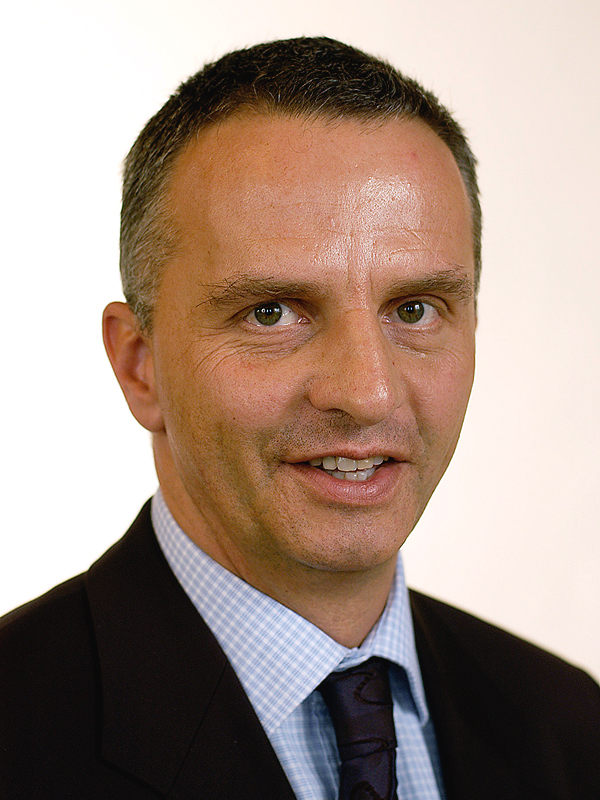
Didier Burkhalter was a member of Neuchâtel's city government (Conseil communal) from 1991 to 2005 and its mayor several times (1994/1995, 1998/1998, 2001/2002). In 2009, he was elected to the Federal Council.

Mayor (Président du Conseil communal) of Neuchâtel
Term	Mayor	Lifespan	Party	Notes
1888–1893	Frédéric-Auguste Monnier	(1847–1931)		
1893–1900	Alfred Jeanhenry	(1845–1902)		
2000/2001	Françoise Jeanneret	(born 1959)	PSS	
2001/2002	Didier Burkhalter	(born 1960)		
2002/2003	Eric Augsburger			
2003/2004	Antoine Grandjean			
2004/2005	Françoise Jeanneret	(born 1959)	PSS	
2005/2006	Antoine Grandjean			
2006/2007	Daniel Perdrizat			
2007/2008	Valérie Garbani	(born 1966)	PSS	
2008/2009	Pascal Sandoz	(born 1959)	PLR	
2009/2010	Françoise Jeanneret	(born 1959)	PSS	
2010/2011	Daniel Perdrizat			
2011/2012	Alain Ribaux	(born 1962)	PLR	
2012/2013	Pascal Sandoz	(born 1959)	PLR	
2013/2014	Olivier Arni	(born 1969)	PSS	
