= Christian Lüscher =

Swiss politician

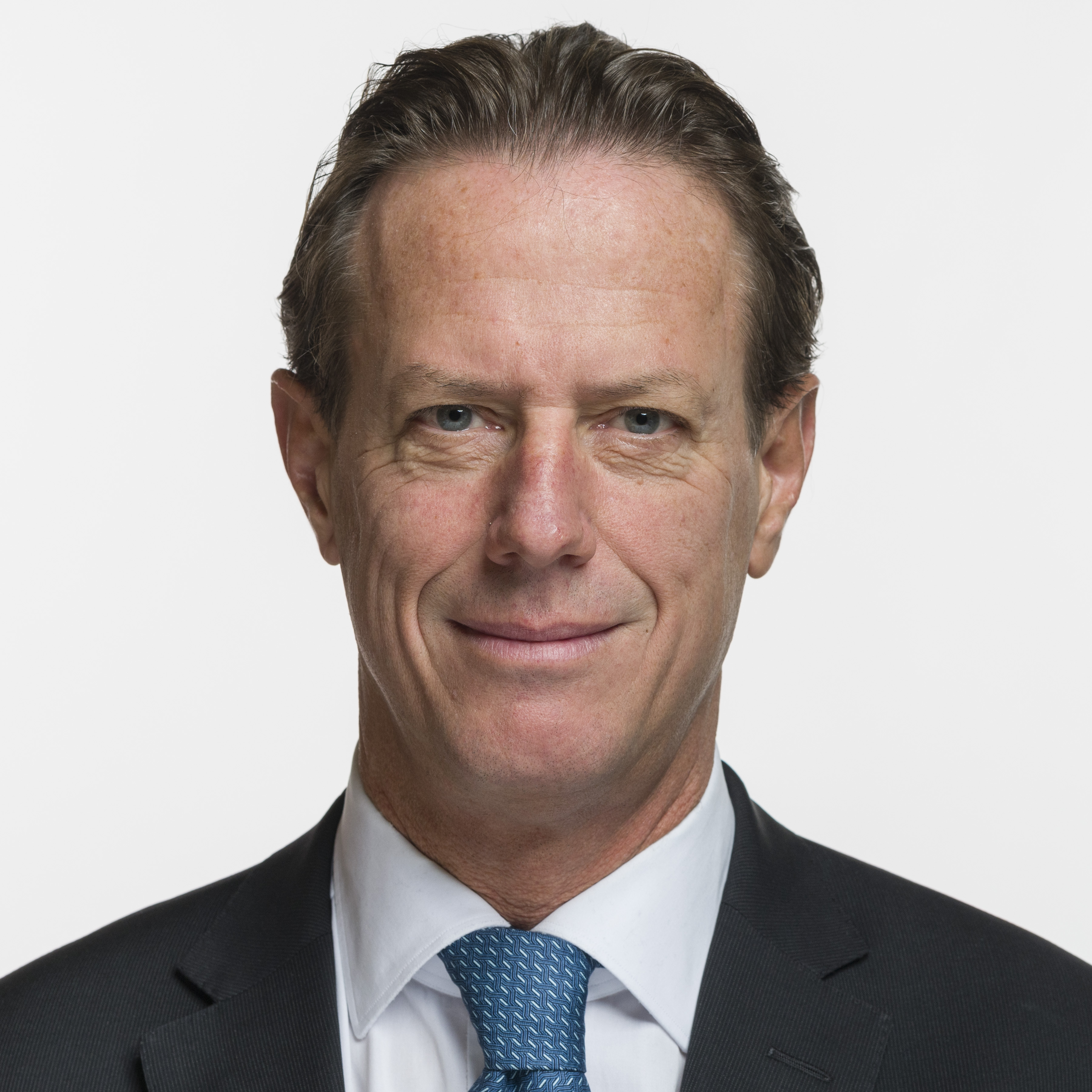
- Official portrait, 2019

Member of the National Council (Switzerland)
- In office 3 December 2007 – 3 December 2023
- Constituency: Canton of Geneva

Personal details
- Born: Christian Lüscher; 6 December 1963 (age 62) Geneva, Switzerland
- Party: The Liberals
- Spouse(s): Audrey Rohner (m. 1988) Marie Schiefelbusch (m. 2012)
- Domestic partner: Lolita Morena (2008–2009)
- Children: 4
- Education: University of Geneva (Licentiate); Tulane University (Master of Law)
- Occupation: Attorney, politician

Christian Lüscher (French pronunciation: [kʁis.tjɑ̃ ly.ʃɛʁ]; born 6 December 1963) is a Swiss attorney and politician who served on the National Council (Switzerland) from 2007 to 2023 for the Free Democratic Party and nominee in the 2009 Swiss Federal Council election. Lüscher is a partner in CMS, a multinational law firm.

== Early life and education ==
Lüscher was born 6 December 1963 in Geneva, Switzerland, the second of three children, to Raymond Lüscher (1935–2008) and Béatrice Lüscher (née Hurst; born 1937), into a Protestant family. He has an older and one younger sister.

Both his parents originally hail from German-speaking Switzerland with his paternal family being from Muhen and his maternal family being from Niederösch. His mother, served as mayor of Troinex, from 1991 to 1998, and concurrently also as member of the Grand Council of Geneva from 1980 to 1993.

He attended the public schools in Pinchat and Troinex, completing his Matura at Collège Calvin in Geneva. He subsequently studied Law at the University of Geneva where he graduated with a Licentiate degree in 1987. He was admitted to the Genevan Bar in 1990. In 1991, Lüscher obtained a Master of Laws at the Tulane University School of Law in New Orleans.

== Politicial career ==
During the campaign for the 2009 Federal Council elections Lüscher declared to the newspaper "Tribune de Genève" to represent the right wing of the Swiss political spectrum.

Lüscher is a firm supporter of banking secrecy. He is in favor of the construction of new nuclear plants in Switzerland.

== Professional career ==
Lüscher practises law in Geneva with Charles Poncet and others as a partner in the ZPG law firm. He was co-chairman of the Servette FC football club from 2002 until its bankruptcy in 2005.

Lüscher serves on several boards most notably Tradexbank AG, Geneva Airport and EEII AG.

== Personal life ==
In 1988, Lüscher firstly married to Audrey Rohner, a daughter of Walter Rohner and Mariuccia Rohner (née Kronauer). They had two sons and the marriage ended in divorce. He was in a brief relationship with Lolita Morena from 2008 to 2009.

In 2012, he secondly married Dutch-born Marie Schiefelbusch, a wealth manager at the private bank Julius Baer, with whom he has two children (twins).
