= Guy Parmelin =

Swiss Federal Councillor since 2016

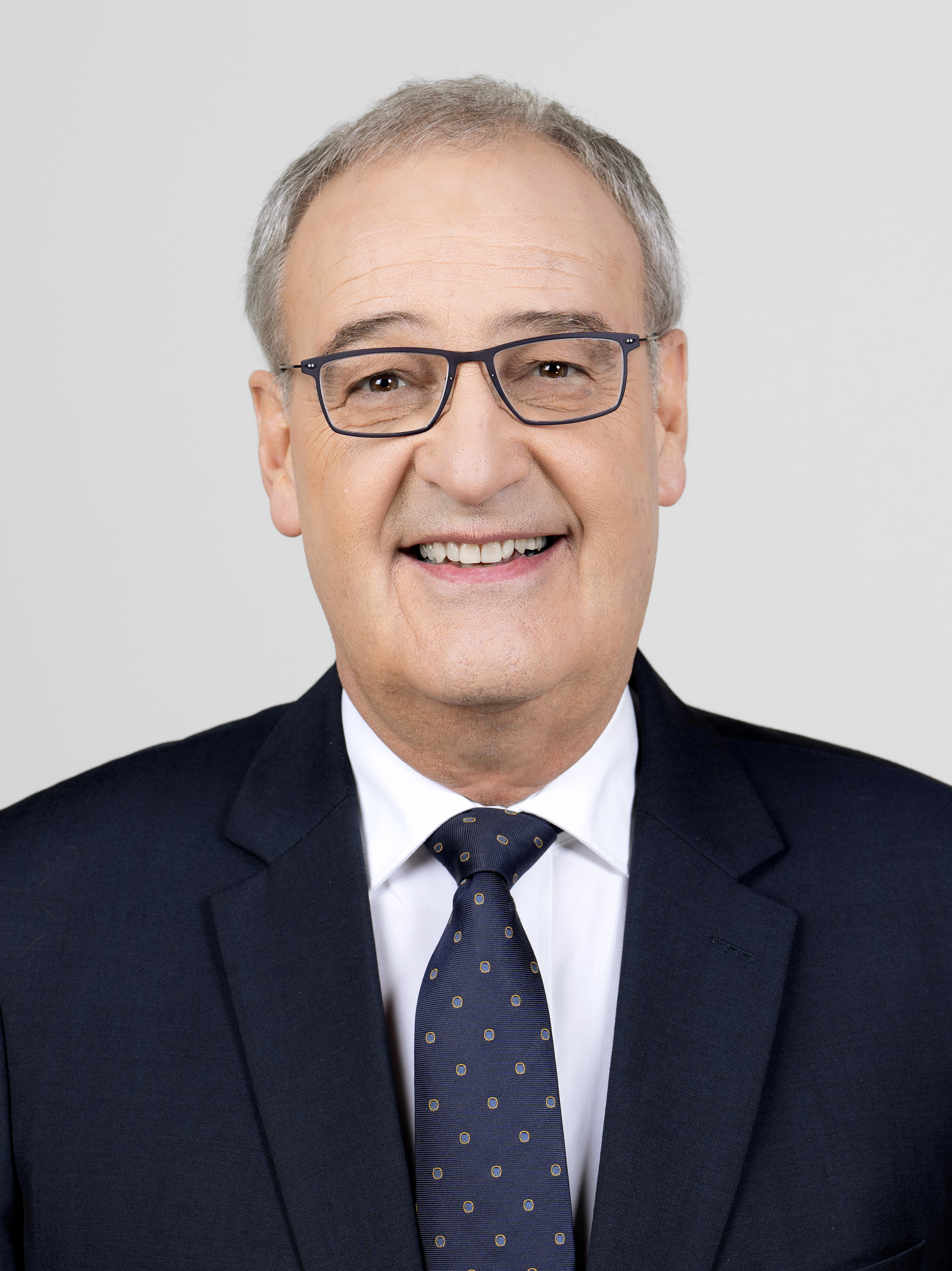
- Official portrait, 2026

President of Switzerland
- Incumbent
- Assumed office 1 January 2026
- Vice President: Ignazio Cassis
- Preceded by: Karin Keller-Sutter
- In office 1 January 2021 – 31 December 2021
- Vice President: Ignazio Cassis
- Preceded by: Simonetta Sommaruga
- Succeeded by: Ignazio Cassis

Vice President of Switzerland
- In office 1 January 2025 – 31 December 2025
- President: Karin Keller-Sutter
- Preceded by: Karin Keller-Sutter
- Succeeded by: Ignazio Cassis
- In office 1 January 2020 – 31 December 2020
- President: Simonetta Sommaruga
- Preceded by: Simonetta Sommaruga
- Succeeded by: Ignazio Cassis

Swiss Federal Councillor
- Incumbent
- Assumed office 1 January 2016
- Department: Defence, Civil Protection and Sports (2016–2018); Economic Affairs, Education and Research (2018–)
- Preceded by: Eveline Widmer-Schlumpf

Member of the Swiss National Council
- In office 1 December 2003 – 31 December 2015
- Constituency: Vaud

Personal details
- Born: Guy Bernard Parmelin; 9 November 1959 (age 66) Bursins, Vaud, Switzerland
- Party: Swiss People's Party
- Spouse: Caroline Merotto (m. 1995)

Guy Bernard Parmelin (French pronunciation: [ɡi bɛʁnaʁ paʁməlɛ̃]; born 9 November 1959) is a Swiss politician and viticulturist who has been a member of the Federal Council since 2016. A member of the Swiss People's Party (SVP/UDC), he is currently the president of Switzerland for 2026, having previously served as president in 2021 and as vice president in 2020 and 2025. Parmelin has also led the Department of Economic Affairs, Education and Research since 2019. He previously led the Department of Defence, Civil Protection and Sports between 2016 and 2018.

== Early life and education ==
Parmelin was born 9 November 1959 in Bursins, the oldest of three children, to Richard Parmelin, a farmer and winegrower, and Jeannine Parmelin (née Favre; 1939–2020). His siblings are Christophe Parmelin and Valérie Cottet (née Parmelin).

He completed his Gymnasium Matura in 1977 and then completed a diploma in agriculture at the Cantonal Agricultural College Marcelin in Morges. In 1985, he completed a master's degree in viticulture.

== Biography ==
=== Early political career ===
A master wine grower by trade, he was elected to the Grand Council of Vaud from 1994 until 2003, when he was elected to the National Council for the canton of Vaud. From 2000 to 2004, Parmelin was also president of the Swiss People's Party of the canton of Vaud. On 9 December 2015, he was elected by the Federal Assembly to the Federal Council in replacement of Eveline Widmer-Schlumpf.

=== Member of the Federal Council ===
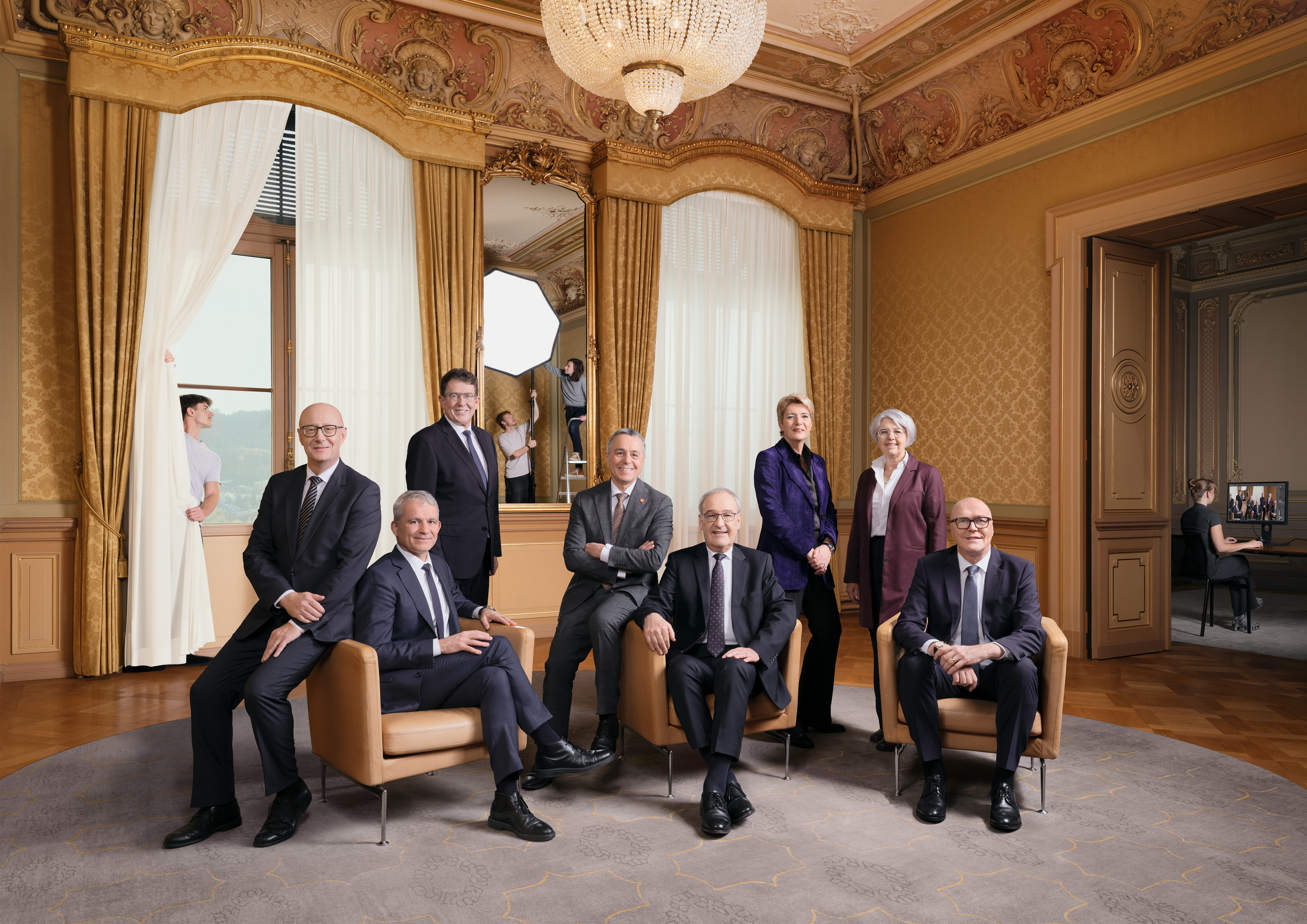
Parmelin (seated centre) in the official Federal Council group photo for 2026, designed according to his wishes

After the Swiss People's Party won a record vote of over 29% in the 2015 general election, Federal Councillor Eveline Widmer-Schlumpf announced she would not run for reelection. She had been expelled from the SVP/UDC shortly after her election in 2007, whereupon she founded the splinter Conservative Democratic Party (BDP/PBD). The SVP/UDC was expected to take Widmer-Schlumpf's seat; it put forward three candidates, including Parmelin, who was ultimately elected.

Parmelin became the first SVP/UDC Federal Councillor from the French-speaking part of Switzerland. He was selected to become head of the Federal Department of Defence, Civil Protection and Sports, replacing fellow party member Ueli Maurer, who became head of the Federal Department of Finance. Starting in 2019, Parmelin became the head of the Federal Department of Economic Affairs, Education and Research. He served as Vice President of Switzerland in 2020. He assumed the presidency on 1 January 2021 alongside Vice President Ignazio Cassis.

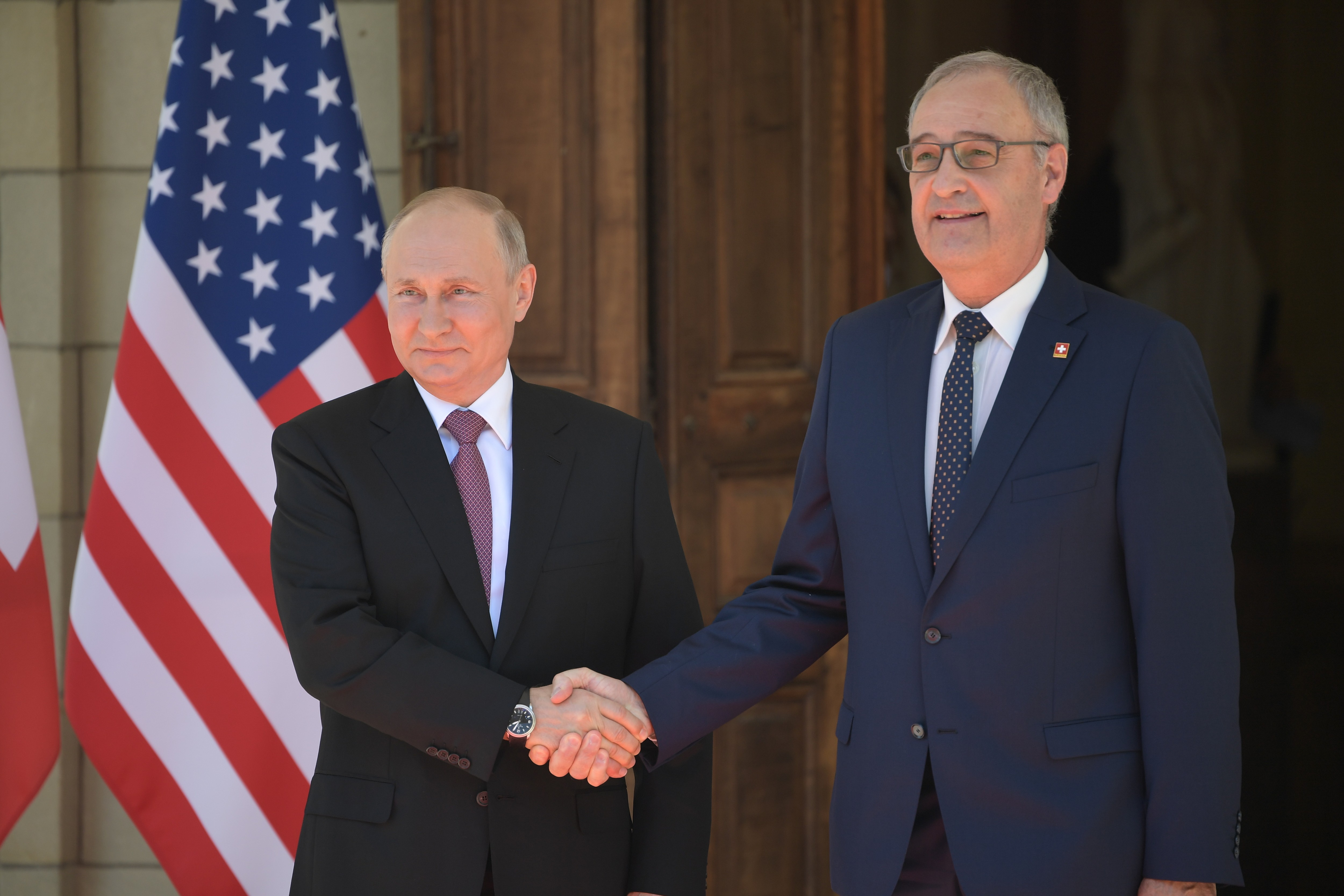
Parmelin with Russian President Vladimir Putin in front of the Villa La Grange on 16 June 2021

On 16 June 2021, as President of Switzerland, Parmelin hosted the 2021 Russia–United States summit at Villa La Grange in Geneva between Vladimir Putin and Joe Biden. He wished them "a fruitful dialogue, in the interests of [their] two countries, and the world".

On 10 December 2025, Parmelin was elected Federal President for the year 2026 with 203 valid votes in the Federal Assembly (of a total of 246).

On 9 January 2026, Parmelin addressed the nation in an open letter following the lethal New Year's Eve fire at the Le Constellation bar in Crans-Montana, which killed 40 people, many teenagers, and injured over 110, pledging solidarity and demanding investigations into safety breaches.

On 2 October 2026, Parmelin announced he would retire at the end of 2026.

== Personal life ==
In 1995, Parmelin married Caroline Merotto, the daughter of Aldo Merotto, an engineer of Italian origin, and Maria Merotto (née Moosrainer). They have no children.

Political offices
Preceded by Eveline Widmer-Schlumpf	Member of the Swiss Federal Council; 2016–present	Incumbent
Preceded by Ueli Maurer	Head of the Department of Defence, Civil Protection and Sports; 2016–2018	Succeeded by Viola Amherd
Preceded by Johann Schneider-Ammann	Head of the Department of Economic Affairs, Education and Research; 2019–present	Incumbent
Preceded by Simonetta Sommaruga	Vice President of Switzerland; 2020	Succeeded by Ignazio Cassis
Preceded by Simonetta Sommaruga	President of Switzerland; 2021	Succeeded by Ignazio Cassis
Preceded by Karin Keller-Sutter	Vice President of Switzerland; 2025	Succeeded by Ignazio Cassis
Preceded by Karin Keller-Sutter	President of Switzerland; 2026	Incumbent
