= Ignazio Cassis =

Swiss Federal Councillor since 2017

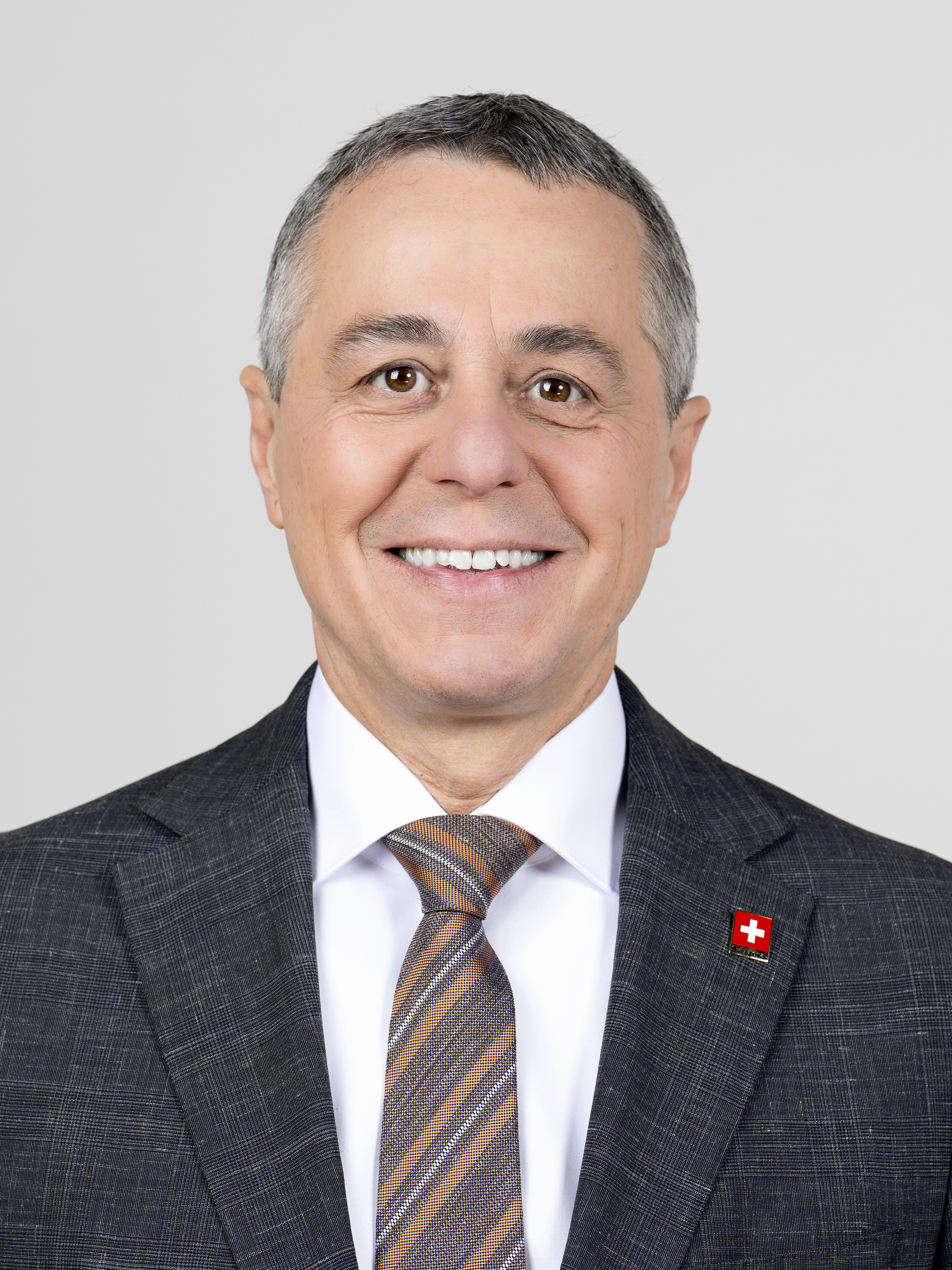
- Official portrait, 2026

President of Switzerland
- In office 1 January 2022 – 31 December 2022
- Vice President: Alain Berset
- Preceded by: Guy Parmelin
- Succeeded by: Alain Berset

Vice President of Switzerland
- Incumbent
- Assumed office 1 January 2026
- President: Guy Parmelin
- Preceded by: Guy Parmelin
- In office 1 January 2021 – 31 December 2021
- President: Guy Parmelin
- Preceded by: Guy Parmelin
- Succeeded by: Alain Berset

Swiss Federal Councillor
- Incumbent
- Assumed office 1 November 2017
- Department: Foreign Affairs (2017–present)
- Preceded by: Didier Burkhalter

Personal details
- Born: Ignazio Daniele Giovanni Cassis; 13 April 1961 (age 65) Sessa, Ticino, Switzerland
- Party: FDP.The Liberals
- Spouse: Dr. Paola Rodoni
- Education: University of Zurich; University of Lausanne

Cassis speaking at the 2024 World Economic Forum

Ignazio Daniele Giovanni Cassis (Italian pronunciation: [iɲˈɲattsjo ˈkassis]; born 13 April 1961) is a Swiss physician and politician who has served as a member of the Swiss Federal Council since 1 November 2017 and as Vice President of the Swiss Confederation for 2026. A member of FDP.The Liberals, Cassis was elected to the Federal Council on 20 September 2017 following the resignation of Didier Burkhalter. He has headed the Federal Department of Foreign Affairs since he took office. On 8 December 2021, Cassis was elected President of the Swiss Confederation for 2022.

== Early life and education ==
Cassis was born 13 April 1961 at Malcantonese Hospital in Croglio (presently Sessa) in Ticino, to Gino Cassis and Mariarosa. He has three sisters. He was born an Italian citizen and received Swiss citizenship by derivation when his parents naturalized in 1976. He held dual citizenship until his election in 2017. Cassis studied medicine at the University of Zurich and the University of Lausanne until 1987.

== Career ==
He subsequently specialised in internal medicine and public health; he received his master's degree in public health in 1996. Cassis was awarded a doctorate in medicine (Dr. med., MD) from the University of Lausanne in 1998. He was a cantonal doctor in Ticino from 1996 to 2008 and vice president of the Foederatio Medicorum Helveticorum (FMH, literally "Swiss Medical Association") from 2008 to 2012.

== Political career ==
=== National Council ===
Residing in the canton of Ticino, Cassis served in the National Council from 4 June 2007 to 30 October 2017 where he was affiliated with FDP.The Liberals.

=== Federal Council ===
When Federal Councillor Didier Burkhalter announced his retirement in 2017, Cassis was one of the three candidates the FDP chose to replace him, the other two being Isabelle Moret (a National Councillor from Vaud) and Pierre Maudet (a cantonal official from Geneva and former mayor of Geneva). Cassis was considered the favourite to succeed Burkhalter.

In the election, held on 20 September 2017, the Federal Assembly elected Cassis to the Federal Council in the second round by taking 125 of 244 valid votes, becoming the 117th Federal Councillor since 1848. He was supported by the centre-right and right-wing parties in the Assembly. Cassis became the first Federal Councillor from Ticino since 1999, and the first Italian-speaking Federal Councillor since then. The Swiss press generally commented positively on Cassis's election.

Cassis took office on 1 November 2017 as head of the Department of Foreign Affairs, succeeding Didier Burkhalter. He caused some controversy shortly after his election when the media reported that he addressed and joined ProTell, a gun rights advocacy group, nine days before his election, something that might have made his relationship with the EU difficult as Foreign Minister due to discussions over joint gun policy. Cassis ended his membership in ProTell and other gun rights organisations shortly afterward.

A member of the Swiss Parliament's Israel Friendship Group, Ignazio Cassis defends positions perceived as pro-Israeli. In 2019, he ordered the suspension of Swiss aid to UNRWA, which he had criticized in several speeches.

In 2021 Cassis served as Vice President of Switzerland. On 8 December 2021, he was elected President of Switzerland for the year 2022. He assumed the office on 1 January 2022 succeeding Guy Parmelin.

In 2022, as president of the Swiss Confederation, Cassis took a leading role in redefining Swiss neutrality in light of the Russian invasion of Ukraine. In a delicate balance between a failed agreement towards the EU proposed framework accord and Swiss national interests, he has taken sides with the EU with regard to international sanctions against Russia. On 20 October, Cassis made an official visit to Ukraine, meeting President Volodymyr Zelenskyy, Prime Minister Denys Shmyhal and Foreign Minister Dmytro Kuleba.

== Personal life ==
Cassis is married to Paola Cassis and lives in Montagnola.

Political offices
Preceded by Didier Burkhalter	Member of the Swiss Federal Council; 2017–present	Incumbent
Preceded by Didier Burkhalter	Head of the Department of Foreign Affairs; 2017–present	Incumbent
Preceded by Guy Parmelin	Vice President of Switzerland; 2021	Succeeded by Alain Berset
Preceded by Guy Parmelin	President of Switzerland; 2022	Succeeded by Alain Berset
Preceded by Guy Parmelin	Vice President of Switzerland; 2026	Incumbent
