= Urs Schwaller =

Swiss politician

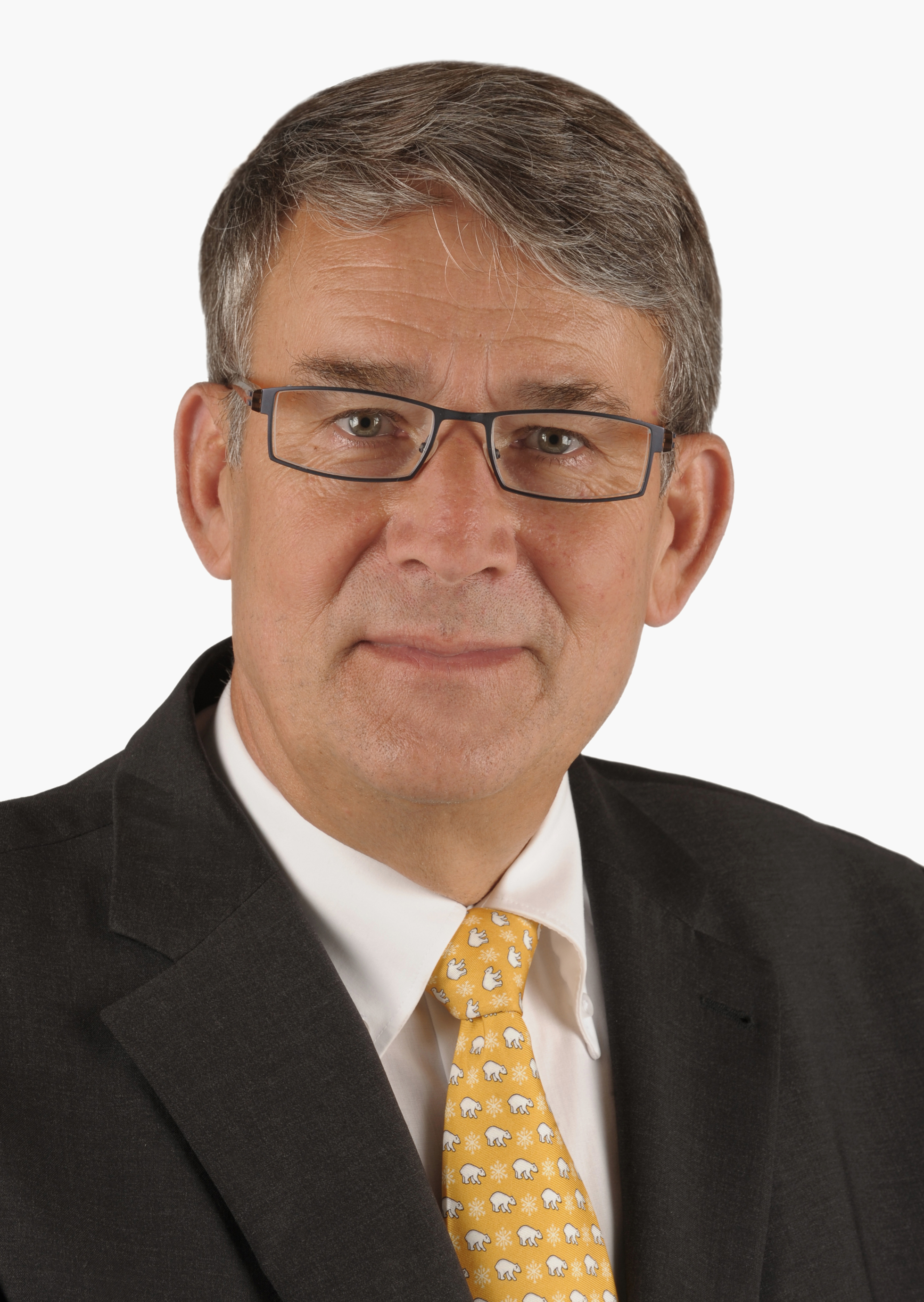
Urs Schwaller, 2007

Urs Schwaller (born 31 October 1952 in Fribourg) is a Swiss politician. He was a member of the cantonal government of Fribourg, the Conseil d'Etat from 1992 to 2004. He then served in the Swiss Council of States for the Canton of Fribourg from 2003 to 2015. From 2005 to 2014 he was the parliamentary leader of the CVP/EVP/glp.
