= Vice President of Switzerland =

Deputy to the President of Switzerland

Vice President of the Federal Council
- Vizepräsident des Bundesrates (German); Vice-président du Conseil fédéral (French); Vicepresidente del Consiglio federale (Italian); Vicepresident dal Cussegl federal (Romansh)

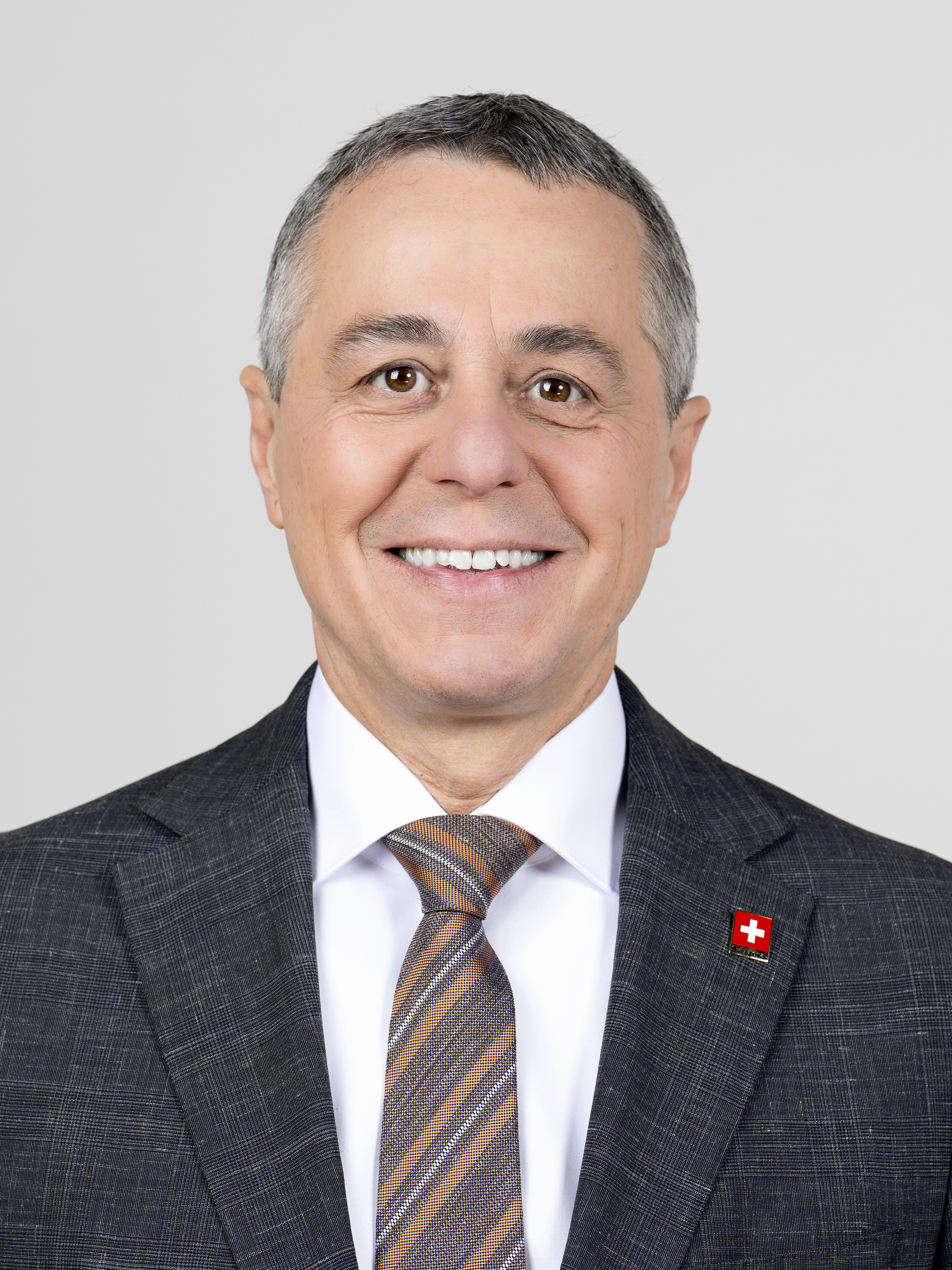
- Incumbent; Ignazio Cassis since 1 January 2026
- Status: Presiding member
- Member of: Federal Council
- Term length: Unlimited non-consecutive one-year terms
- Inaugural holder: Henri Druey
- Formation: 21 November 1848; 177 years ago
- Website: Federal Presidency

The vice president of the Swiss Confederation, also known as the vice president of the Federal Council or colloquially as the vice president of Switzerland, is, as primus inter pares among the other members of the Federal Council, the deputy to the President of the Swiss Confederation and a member of Switzerland's seven-member executive branch.

A vice president of the Federal Council is elected alongside the president of the Swiss Confederation; customarily, the elected vice president is the member of the Federal Council who is expected to become president the following year. However, as for the choice of president, this rule is unwritten. The only formal rule, as specified in article 176 of the Swiss Constitution, is that the president can not be elected as either president or vice president for the following year.

The current vice president is Ignazio Cassis, since 1 January 2026.
