= President of the Swiss Confederation =

Presiding member of the Swiss Federal Council

- Bundespräsident(in) (German); Président(e) de la Confédération (French); Presidente della Confederazione (Italian); President(a) da la Confederaziun (Romansh)

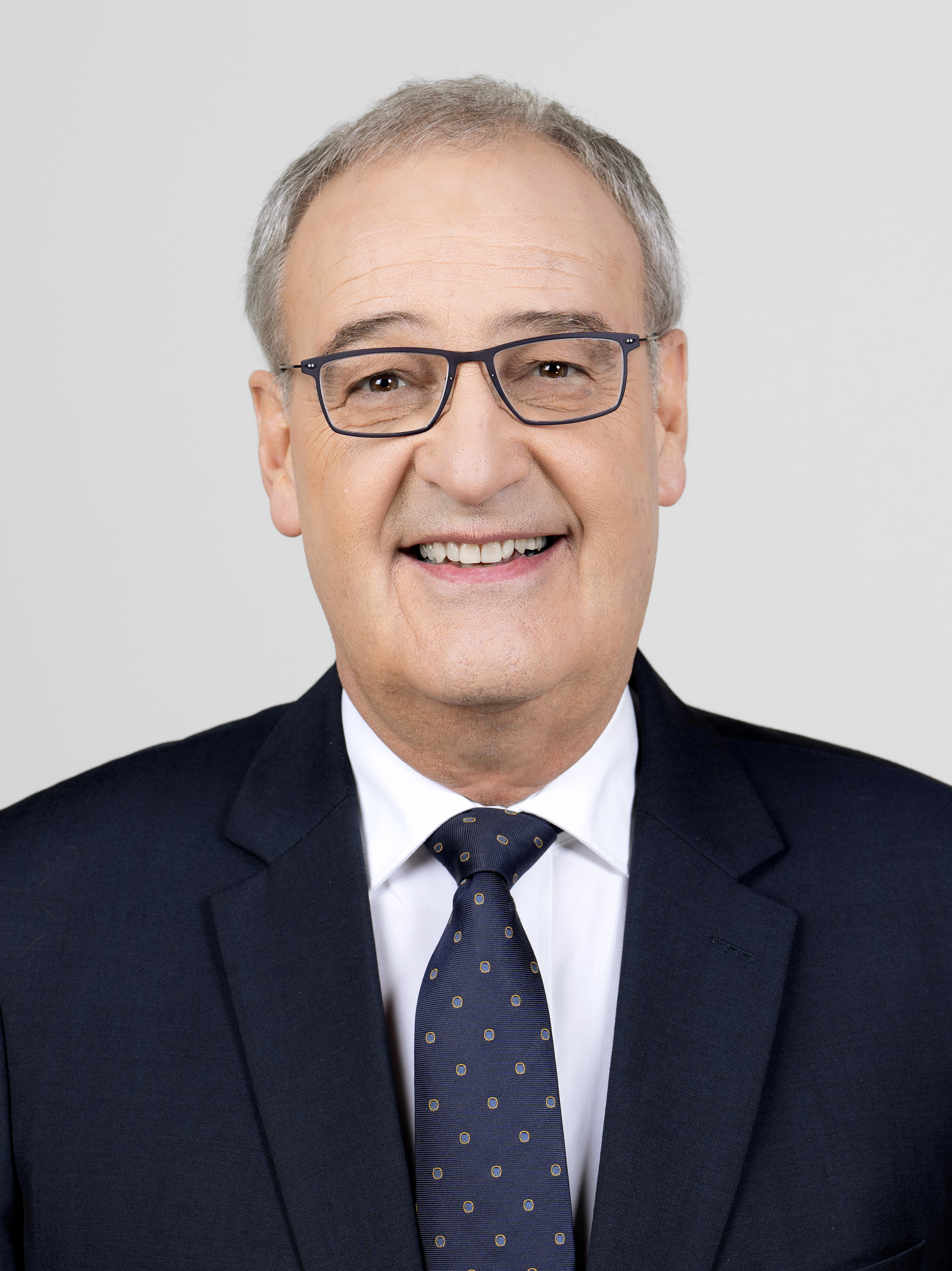
- Incumbent; Guy Parmelin since 1 January 2026
- Status: Presiding member
- Member of: Federal Council
- Appointer: Federal Assembly
- Term length: Unlimited non-consecutive one-year terms
- Inaugural holder: Jonas Furrer
- Formation: 21 November 1848; 177 years ago
- Deputy: Vice President
- Salary: CHF 478,166 annually
- Website: Federal Presidency

The president of the Swiss Confederation, also known as the president of the confederation, federal president or colloquially as the president of Switzerland is, as primus inter pares among the other members of the Federal Council, the head of Switzerland's seven-member executive branch. Elected by the Federal Assembly for one year, the officeholder chairs the meetings of the Federal Council and undertakes special representational duties.

First among equals, the president of the Confederation has no powers over and above the other six councillors and continues to head the assigned department. Traditionally the duty rotates among the members in order of seniority; the vice president of the Federal Council assumes the presidency the year after the officeholder's tenure. The president of the Confederation is not the head of state because the entire Federal Council is the collective head of state.

The constitutional provisions relating to the organisation of the Federal Government and federal administration are set out in Section 1 Organisation and Procedure of Chapter 3 Federal Council and Federal Administration of the Title 5 Federal Authorities of the Swiss Federal Constitution at articles 174 to 179. Article 176 specifically relates to the presidency.

The current president is Guy Parmelin, since 1 January 2026.

== Competencies ==
The Swiss president is not – as are, for example, the presidents in Austria or Germany – the head of state of the country: under the Swiss Federal Constitution, the Federal Council doubles as a head of state and government. When a tied vote occurs in the council (which may happen despite an odd number of members, since abstention is permitted, and a meeting of the council can take place without all members present, subject to a quorum of four), the president's vote is worth double.

In addition to the control of their own department, the president carries out some of the representative duties that are normally carried out by a single head of state in other democracies. For example, since joining the United Nations, Swiss presidents have on occasion spoken at inaugural sessions of the General Assembly along with other visiting heads of state and government. However, because the Swiss have no single head of state, the country carries out no state visits. When travelling abroad, the president does so only in their capacity as head of their department. Visiting heads of state are received by the seven members of the Federal Council together, rather than by the president of the Confederation. Treaties are signed on behalf of the full council, with all Federal Council members signing letters of credence and other documents of the kind.

== Election ==
The president is elected by the Federal Assembly from the Federal Council for a term of one year.

In the nineteenth century, the election as president of the confederation was an award for especially esteemed Federal Council members. However, a few less influential members of the government were regularly passed over. One such example was Wilhelm Matthias Naeff, who – although a member of the Federal Council for 27 years – was president only once, in 1853.

Since the twentieth century, the election has usually not been disputed. There is an unwritten rule that the member of the Federal Council who has not been president the longest becomes president. Therefore, every Federal Council member gets a turn at least once every seven years. The only question in the elections that provides some tension is the question of how many votes the person who is to be elected president receives. This is seen as a popularity test. In the 1970s and 1980s, 200 votes (of 246 possible) was seen as an excellent result, but in the current era of growing party-political conflicts, 180 votes are a respectable outcome.

Until 1920, it was customary for the serving president to also lead the Department of Foreign Affairs. Therefore, every year there was a moving around of posts, as the retiring president returned to his former department and the new president took up the foreign affairs portfolio. Likewise, it was traditional for the president not to leave Switzerland during their year in office.

== See also ==
- List of presidents of the Swiss Confederation
- Chancellor of Switzerland
