= 2025 Swiss Federal Council election =

2025 Swiss Federal Council by-election
- 12 March 2025

1 of the 7 Federal Councillors 123 votes to win
- Amherd's seat
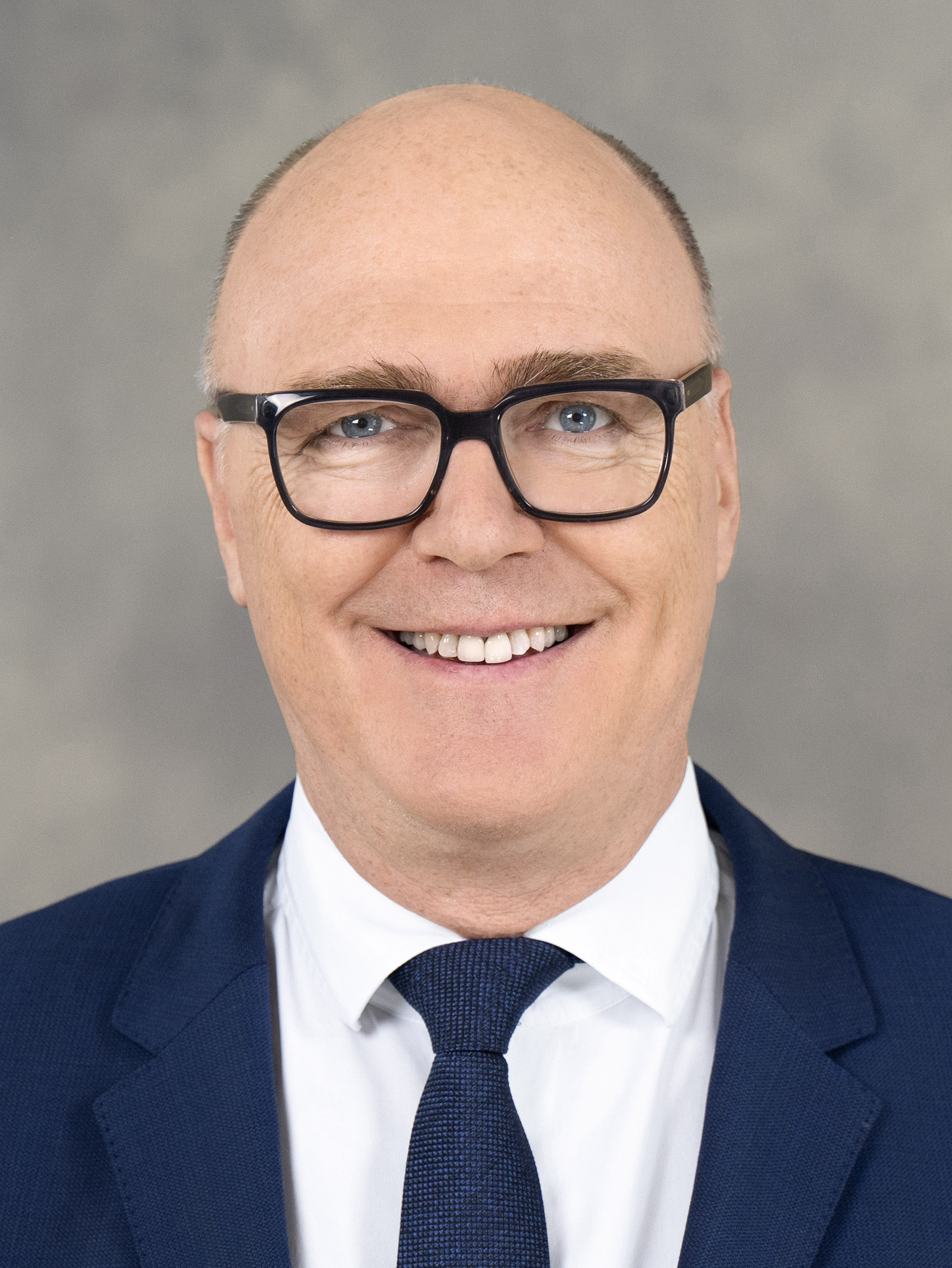

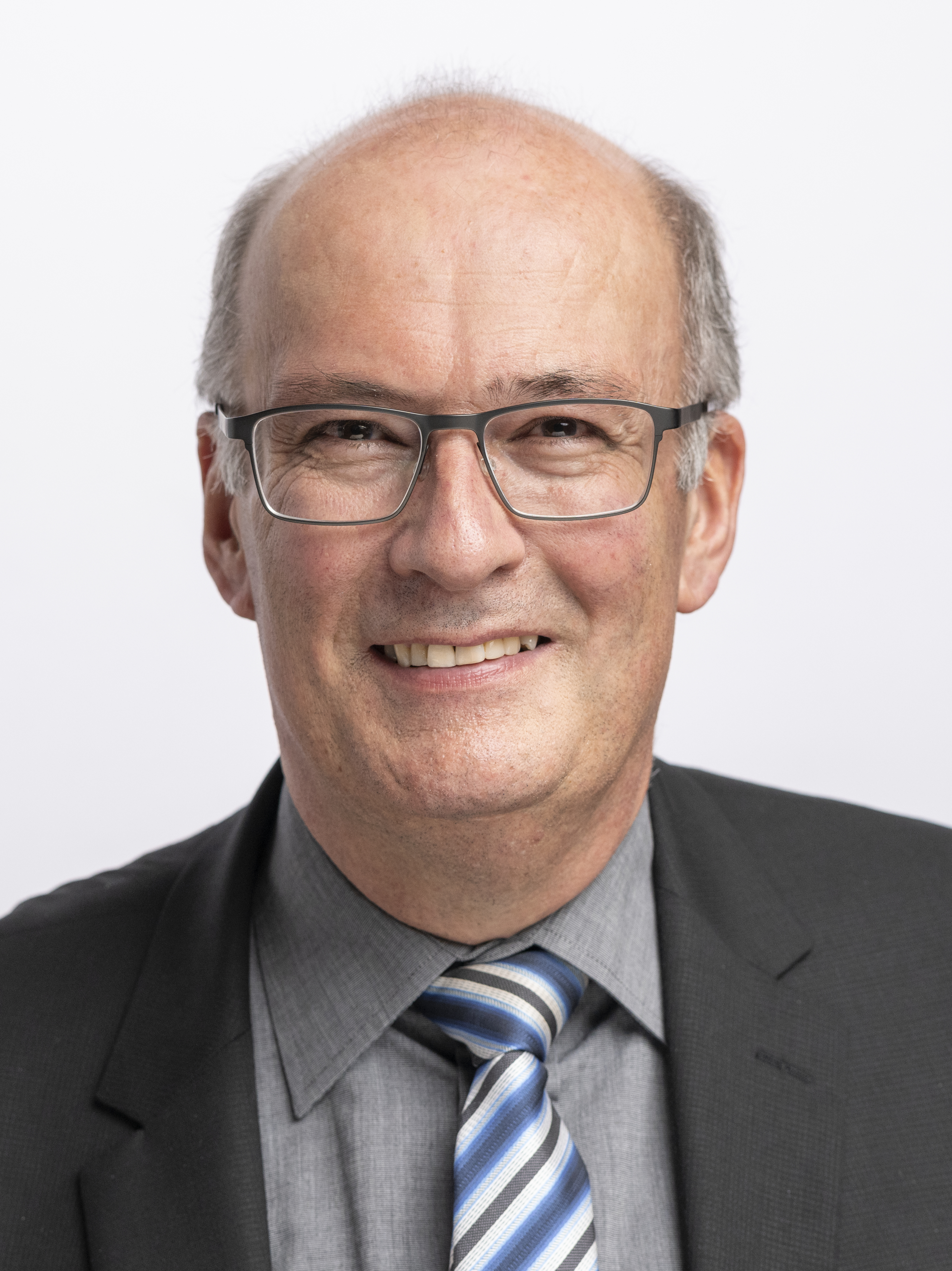
Candidate	Martin Pfister	Markus Ritter
Party	The Centre	The Centre
1st round	122	105
2nd round	134	110

After the resignation of federal councillor and defence minister Viola Amherd, Martin Pfister was elected to the Swiss Federal Council on 12 March 2025.

As per an informal agreement between the major political parties known as the magic formula, the only candidates were from Amherd's party, The Centre. Her successor will take over the leadership of the Federal Department of Defence, Civil Protection and Sport (DDPS).

The two candidates were national councillor from St. Gallen Markus Ritter and cantonal minister Martin Pfister of Zug. Several prominent members of The Centre Party declined to run, amongst them Gerhard Pfister, the outgoing leader of The Centre, who had been speculated to be a strong favourite to succeed Amherd.

== Background ==
=== Amherd's resignation ===
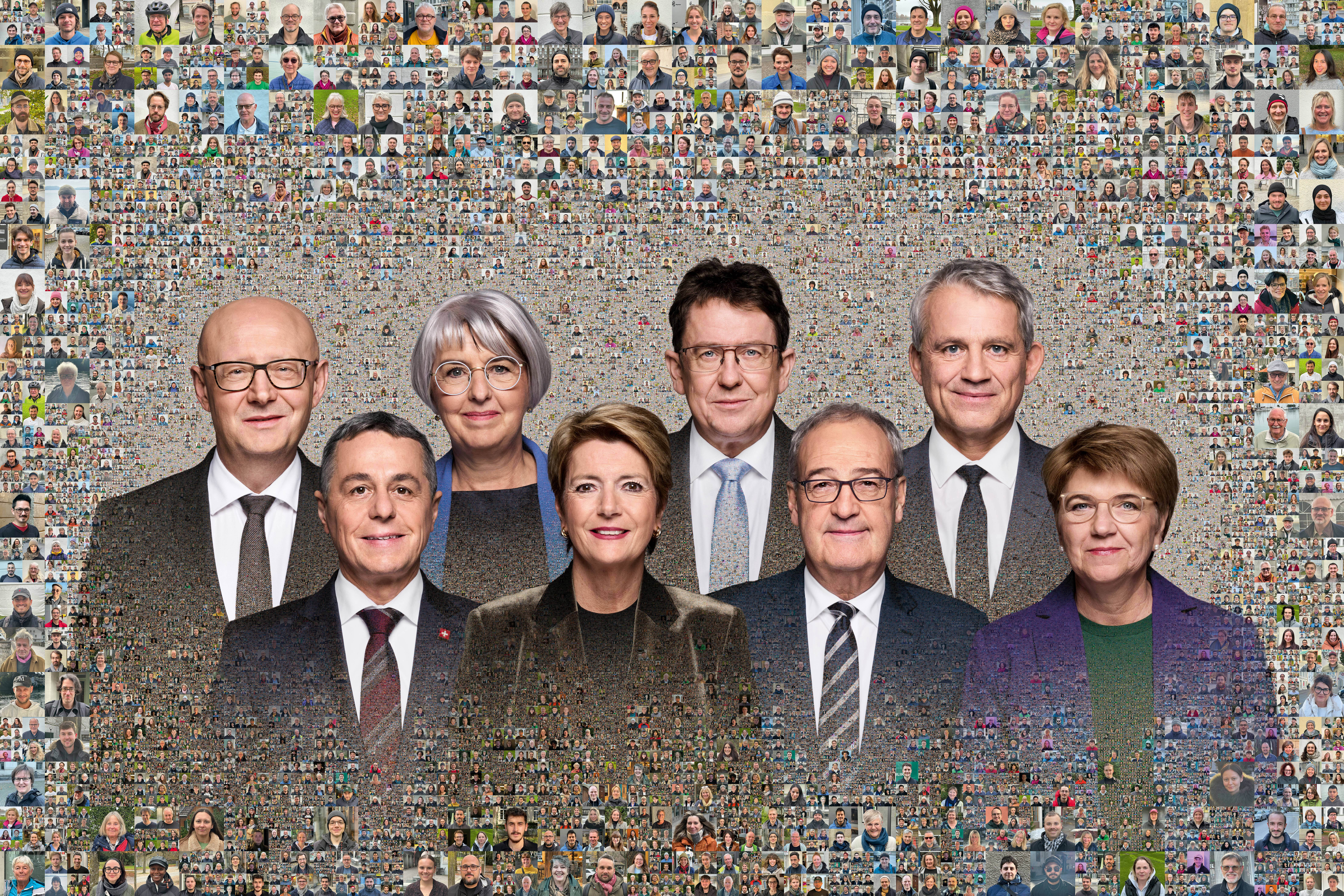
Viola Amherd (bottom right) in the 2025 group photo of the Federal Council

Viola Amherd is a Centre politician from Brig-Glis, Valais, who became a Federal Councillor in 2019 and headed the Federal Department of Defence, Civil Protection and Sport (DDPS). After the 2023 Swiss federal election, she was re-elected for another four-year term of office from 2024 to 2027 and was elected as the President of the Swiss Confederation for 2024. On 15 January 2025, she announced her resignation, effective at the end of March 2025.

Swiss media outlets, including Blick, Neue Zürcher Zeitung, and Watson, had reported on a possible resignation in the weeks around the turn of the year. On 6 January, The Centre party president Gerhard Pfister announced his resignation as party leader. In connection with Pfister's resignation, his ambitions for the Federal Council office were publicly discussed. A few days before Amherd's resignation announcement, the SVP criticized Amherd's conduct in office at a meeting of the party cadre. SVP representatives called for Amherd's resignation. Calls for resignation are considered unusual in Switzerland, which caused other parties to criticize the demand. The possible retirements of Ignazio Cassis and Guy Parmelin were also publicly discussed.

=== Election process of the Federal Council ===
In Switzerland, the seven-seat executive Federal Council is elected by the United Federal Assembly, where both chambers of the bicameral legislature sit together. The vote is held by secret ballot. Seats on the Federal Council are apportioned between the parties following an unwritten agreement known as the "magic formula". The formula originally dates back to 1959; it currently provides two seats each for the SVP, SP, and FDP, and one seat for The Centre.

Federal councillors are traditionally re-elected until they choose to step down. On average, federal councillors have served for ten years. There is no procedure to remove a federal councillor before the end of their term, and only four incumbent candidates have lost re-election. The 2025 election was the first to elect a new councillor since the December 2023 election of Beat Jans.

The Federal Council is elected by an absolute majority of the United Federal Assembly in a secret ballot, each seat being filled independently. Any Swiss citizen with the right to vote is eligible as a candidate. In the first two rounds, members of the Federal Assembly may vote for any eligible candidate, but only those receiving at least ten votes are announced in the results; from the third round onwards only candidates who received at least ten votes in one of the first two rounds are eligible. Following the exhaustive ballot method, the last-placed candidate in each round is eliminated from the next until one candidate receives an absolute majority.

The Federal Council decides how the seven federal departments are distributed to its members, with longer-serving members given priority. The Federal Council may also choose to redistribute the departments at any time. However, Amherd's successor is widely expected to take over the Federal Department of Defence, Civil Protection and Sport.

== Candidates ==
=== Background ===
While nomination of a single candidate to replace a departing Federal Councillor used to be prevalent, Swiss political parties have begun generally nominating at least two candidates since the 1980s. The composition of the list of nominated candidates has been used by the parties to strategically cover internal variety, for example by choosing candidates that lean in differing political orientations or are of differing gender. In contrast, the Swiss Federal Constitution only specifies that the country regions and language regions of Switzerland should be appropriately represented in the composition of the Federal Council. As such The Centre found itself needing to compose a suitable list of candidates to succeed Viola Amherd.

=== Search for candidates ===
There had been a considerable amount of speculation about who might run to succeed Amherd even before she announced her resignation. However, in the week after she had made the announcement most of the people that the media speculated might run declined to run mainly citing a lack of interest in the job. Initially, outgoing The Centre party leader Gerhard Pfister was generally viewed as a favourite, as he was said to be interested in the role, especially after the announcement of his resignation from the role of party leader. However, he announced he had no intentions to run on 18 January in an interview. The Centre party set up a taskforce (Findungskommission) led by Gerhard Pfister and Philipp Matthias Bregy to find candidates and launched the nomination procedure on 20 January. Candidate proposals would be accepted until 3 February and the decision by the taskforce for the final candidate list was set for 21 February.

Many more candidates declined to run, amongst the most notable Martin Candinas, Andrea Gmür-Schönenberger, Philipp Kutter, Philipp Matthias Bregy, Elisabeth Schneider-Schneiter, and Christophe Darbellay. Candinas was seen as an initial favourite; so was Gmür though especially amongst those who called for a female candidate to succeed Amherd. While Kutter initially expressed interest, he ultimately declined to run citing a desire to spend more time with his family. He is quadriplegic and would have been the first Federal Councillor with a motor disability. Schneider-Schneiter and Darbellay were undecided initially and only announced their decision against running shortly before the end of the nomination process.

National councillor Markus Ritter from St. Gallen was the first to officially declared his candidacy on 28 January and was nominated by his cantonal party. Shortly before the end of the nomination period, cantonal minister of Zug Martin Pfister officially declared his candidacy on 3 February and was nominated as well. The nomination process closed with no further candidates on the same day.

=== Candidate list and reactions ===
- Markus Ritter (The Centre-SG), national councillor for St. Gallen since 2011 and president of the Swiss Farmers' Union since 2012
- Martin Pfister (The Centre-ZG), health minister of Zug since 2016
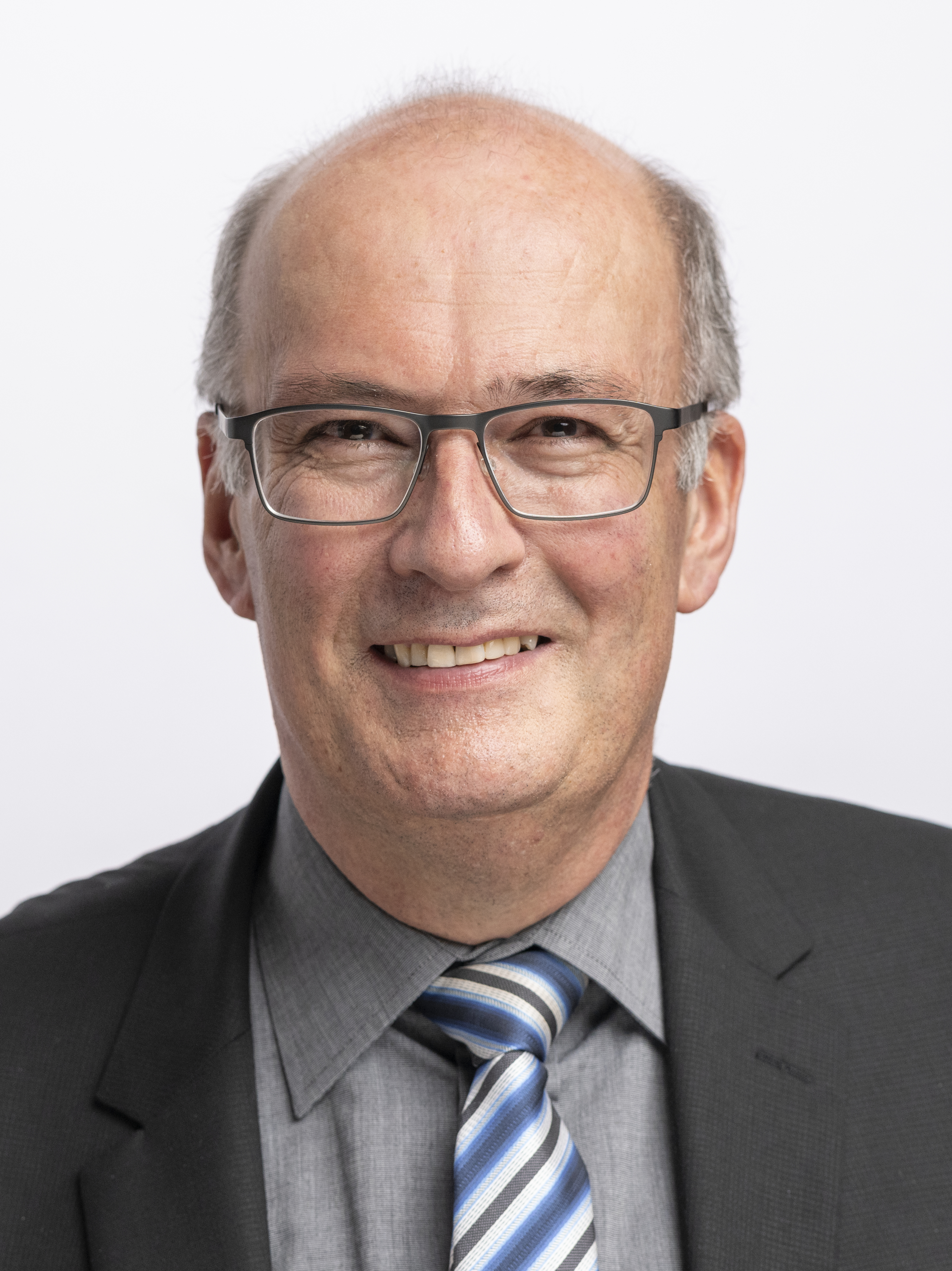
National Councillor
Markus Ritter
from St. Gallen

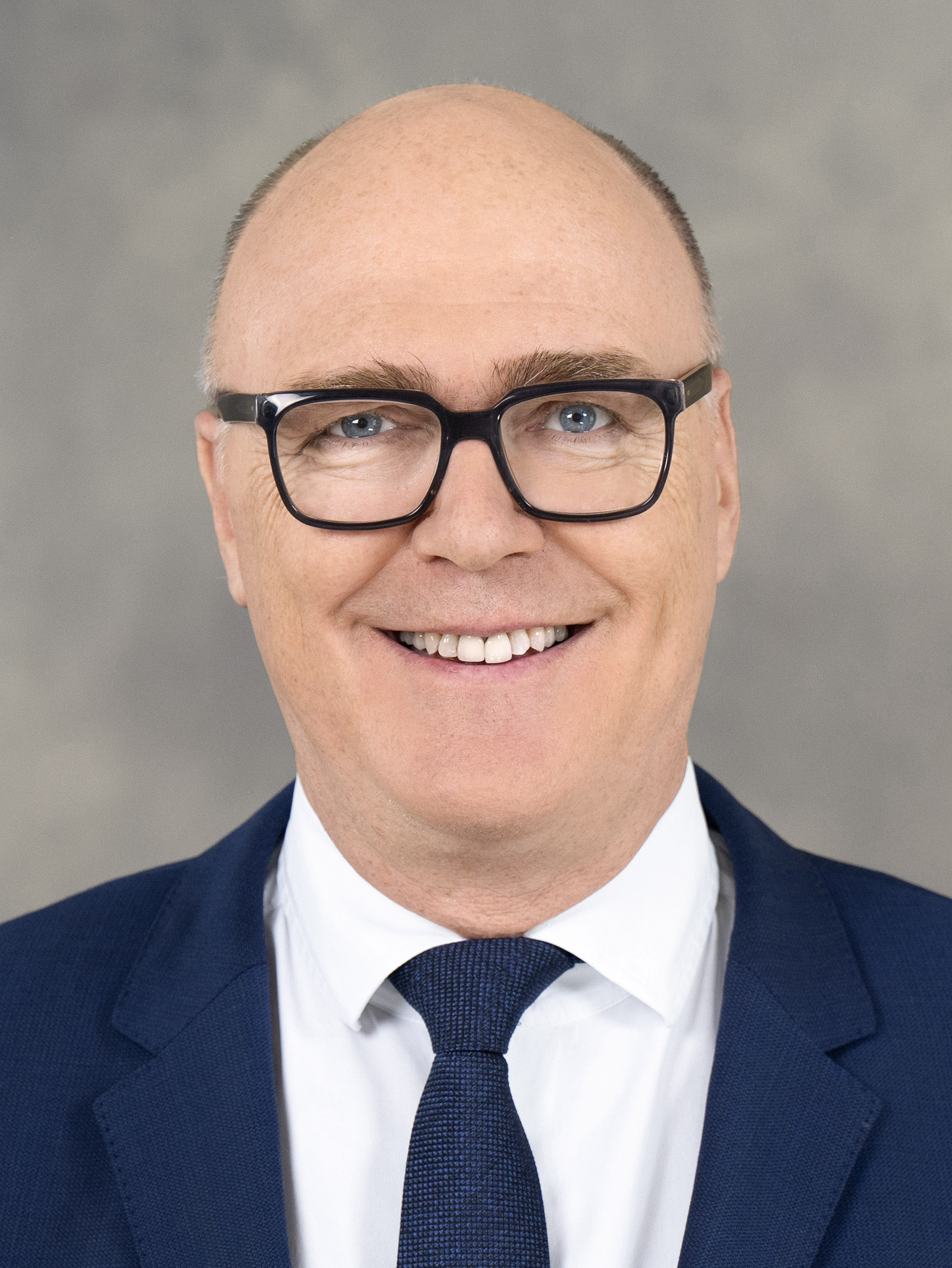
Cantonal Minister
Martin Pfister
from Zug

Initially, Swiss media portrayed Ritter as the clear favourite among the two candidates. However, coverage closer to the election date increasingly reports Pfister to have caught up to his competitioner, attributing him with equal or better odds, and increasingly disputing Ritter's role as the favourite.

In their communiqué regarding the announcement of their official candidate list, The Centre discuss their conviction of having found suitable candidates, backed by Gerhard Pfister and Philipp Matthias Bregy of the Findungskommission taskforce. The Centre Women, a sub-organisation of The Centre, also showed their support for the two candidates in a communiqué, but had demanded that at least a third, female candidate be found.

Outside of The Centre, left-wing parties also showed disapproval of the purely male and right-leaning candidate list. One source reported a notion amongst electors that The Centre is presenting a "weak" candidate list. While the two nominated candidates are generally respected, outliers calling for a "wild election" for another candidate were still reported on in Swiss media.

== Results ==
Martin Pfister was elected into the Federal Council in the second round. Of the 246 members of the Federal Assembly, 245 were present and voted.

Before the election, there were concerns that ballots marked simply with "Pfister" would be declared invalid, since they could refer to either Martin or Gerhard. The head vote-counter asked parliamentarians to fill ballots out precisely. The final tally showed that no ballots were declared invalid.

Candidate	Party	Round 1	Round 2
Martin Pfister	The Centre	122	134
Markus Ritter	The Centre	105	110
Others		18	1
Valid votes		245	245
Absolute majority		123	123
Invalid votes		0	0
Blank votes		0	0
Votes cast		245	245
