= Lili Kohler-Burg =

Swiss teacher, farmer and rural women's movement pioneer (1893–1978)

- Born: Lili Burg; 4 July 1893; Schönenwerd, Switzerland
- Died: 2 October 1978 (aged 85); Brugg, Switzerland
- Occupations: Teacher; farmer; association leader
- Known for: Founding the Aargau Rural Women's Association; co-founder of the Swiss Association of Women Farmers
- Spouse: Max Kohler
- Children: 2

Lili Kohler-Burg, born Lili Burg (4 July 1893 – 2 October 1978), was a Swiss teacher, farmer, and a pioneer of the Swiss rural women's movement. She founded the Aargau Rural Women's Association (Aargauischer Landfrauenverband) and was among the founders of the Swiss Association of Women Farmers, which she chaired from 1939 to 1946.

== Early life and teaching ==
Lili Burg was the daughter of Theodor Burg, administrator of the pension fund of the Bally company, and Emma née Schäfer, and grew up at Schönenwerd with an elder brother and two younger half-sisters. She lost her mother to tuberculosis at the age of six, and her father then married her mother's sister. After attending the district school she qualified at the teachers' college in Aarau and began studying mathematics at the University of Neuchâtel.

Following the outbreak of the First World War in 1914, Burg returned to Schönenwerd, where she stood in for teachers called up for service. She taught at Rheinfelden from 1916 to 1923, where she gave her pupils swimming lessons, unusual for the time and a mark of modernity. In 1923 she married Max Kohler, a farmer at Linn, whom she had met while working as a leader at a holiday camp on the Stalden near Brugg. After her marriage she had to give up teaching and became a farmer. The couple had two sons.

== Rural women's movement ==
Through the women's agricultural associations, Kohler-Burg encouraged women to gain confidence and to improve their standing on farms. In 1929 she founded the women farmers' association of the Brugg district and the Aargauische landwirtschaftliche Frauenvereinigung, renamed in 1930 the Aargauischer Landfrauenverband (Aargau Rural Women's Association), which she chaired for 40 years and of which she was later honorary president.

With the support of Ernst Laur, director of the Swiss Farmers' Union, Kohler-Burg was behind the founding in 1932 of the Swiss Association of Women Farmers, which brought together the cantonal associations of Bern, Schaffhausen, Basel-Stadt, Basel-Landschaft, and Vaud. She was its president from 1939 to 1946, a term marked by the strengthening of the association's secretariat and the appointment of Mascha Oettli, an agronomist and qualified farmer, as its first full-time secretary. She was also a member of the Swiss Farmers' Union's commission for agricultural radio information from 1947 to 1951.

Unlike the first Swiss women farmers' cooperative, founded in 1918 by Augusta Gillabert-Randin, and the first cantonal women farmers' association, created in 1928 on the initiative of Emilie Dettwyler-Jeker, the Aargau association did not aim at its foundation to market agricultural produce, seeking rather to provide immediate and continuing training for women working in agriculture. On Kohler-Burg's initiative it offered from the outset a wide range of courses, covering poultry and pig keeping, horticulture, cooking and nutrition, infant and nursing care, the making of traditional costume, and bookkeeping.

At the Swiss Farmers' Union delegates' assembly in 1943, Kohler-Burg argued without success for an increase in the number of crèches and kindergartens in the countryside in order to lighten the workload of women on farms. On her own farm she trained many apprentices in farming, and she worked to ensure that women's training in the sector was not confined to practical skills but also officially recognized.

== Bibliography ==
- Aargauischer Landfrauenverband, ed., 50 Jahre Aargauischer Landfrauenverband 1929–1979, 1979
- Landfrauenverein Bözberg, ed., 90 Jahre Landfrauen Bözberg. Jubiläumsschrift 1929–2019, 2019
- Schweizerischer Bäuerinnen- und Landfrauenverband, ed., Engagées ensemble depuis 90 ans 1932–2022, 2022
- C. Morgenthaler, "'Was wir wollen, ist keine Emanzipation; es ist Selbsthilfe und Selbstbildung.' Die Anfänge der Landfrauenbewegung in der Schweiz", master's thesis, University of Basel, 2023
- P. Moser, "Die Bäuerin. Einst Dreh- und Angelpunkt der Arbeiten auf dem Bauernhof. Veränderungen des bäuerlichen Familienbetriebs im 19./20. Jahrhundert", in E. Bäschlin, S. Contzen et al., eds., Von Bäuerinnen, Landwirtinnen und Betriebsleiterinnen. Beiträge zu Frauen in der Landwirtschaft, 2025, 17–44

=== Archives ===
- Archiv Gosteli-Stiftung, Worblaufen, Archiv Schweizerischer Landfrauenverband (SLFV)
