= Markus Ritter (politician) =

Swiss politician (born 1967)

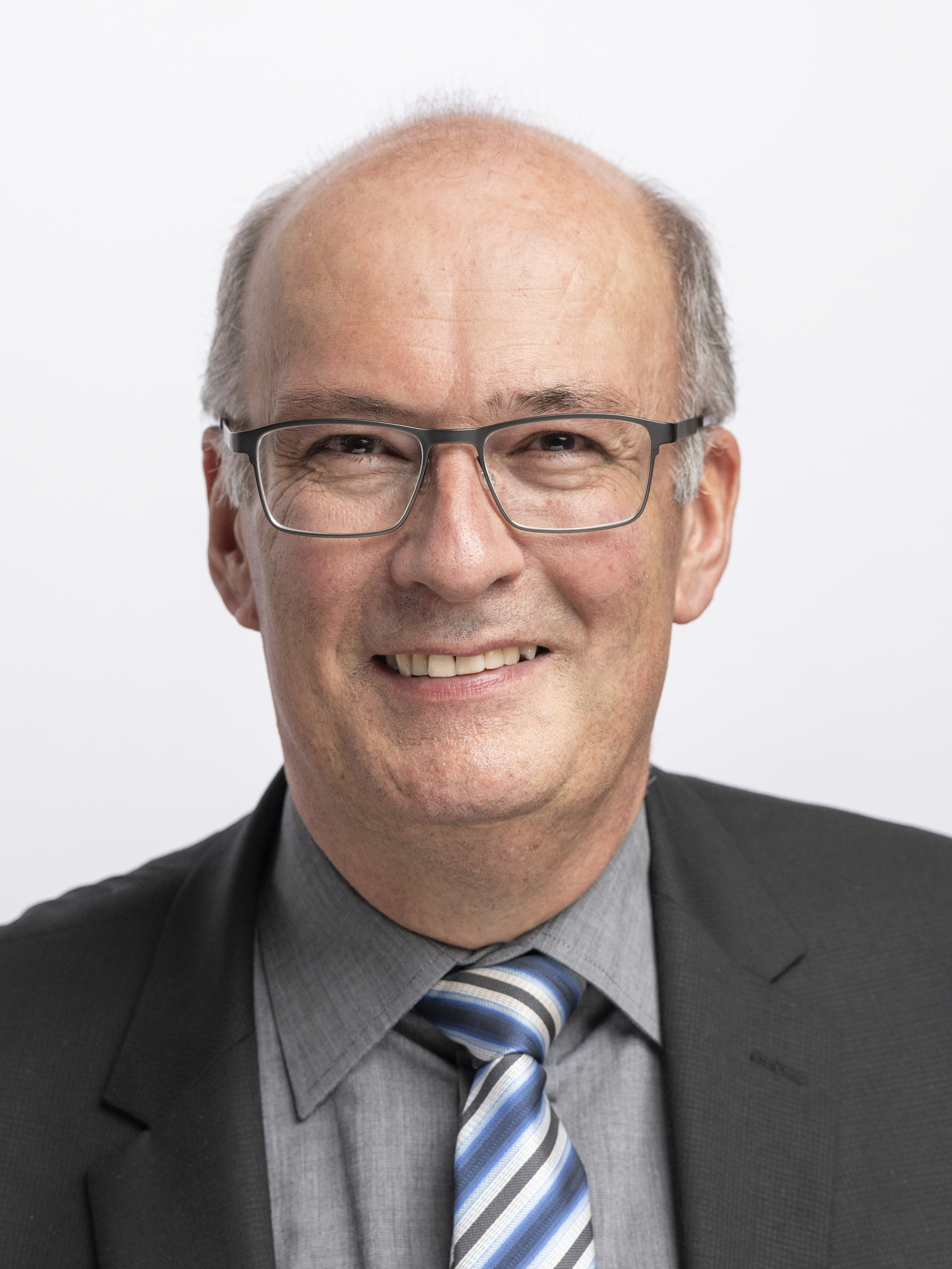
- Official portrait, 2023

Member of the National Council (Switzerland)
- Incumbent
- Assumed office 5 December 2011
- Constituency: Canton of St. Gallen

Personal details
- Born: Markus Vinzenz Ritter; 19 April 1967 (age 58) Altstätten, St. Gallen
- Political party: The Centre
- Spouse: Heidi Haltiner
- Children: 3
- Website: Parliament website Official website

Military service
- Allegiance: Switzerland
- Rank: Gefreiter (Private E-2)

Markus Vinzenz Ritter (German pronunciation: [ˈmaʁkʊs ˈʁɪtɐ]; born 19 April 1967) is a Swiss farmer, lobbyist and politician who currently serves on the National Council (Switzerland) for The Centre since 2011. He concurrently serves as president of the Swiss Farmers' Union since 2012. He is known as a lobbyist for agriculture-related issues.

On 28 January 2025, he was nominated by the Centre Party of St. Gallen as a candidate to succeed Viola Amherd on the Federal Council (Switzerland) as head of the Federal Department of Defence, Civil Protection and Sport. He lost the election to Martin Pfister of Zug.

== Early life and education ==
Ritter was born 19 April 1967 in Altstätten, Switzerland, one of seven children, to Albert Ritter (1925–1983), a farmer originally from Hinterforst, and Helena Ritter (née Baumgartner; died 2024).

He completed studies in engineering management (University of Applied Sciences) and a Master's degree in agriculture.

== Political career ==
Ritter was a member of the city council (German: Stadtrat) of Altstätten from 1993 to 2012 as a member of the CVP. In 2011, Ritter was elected into the National Council, representing the Canton of St. Gallen, and assumed office on 5 December of the same year. Additionally, he was elected as the president of the Swiss Farmers' Union on 21 November 2012 as the successor of Hansjörg Walter.

== Personal life ==
Markus Ritter is married to Heidi Ritter. They have three children.

Since 1989, Ritter has cultivated the family farm in Altstätten, and has also taken ownership of the farm of his in-laws, which he continuously expanded. The farm is medium-sized at 28,2 hectares (roughly 70 acres) and mainly produces organic dairy and field fruits. On 1 January 2023, he sold his farm to his sons.
