= Swiss Association of Women Farmers and Rural Women =

Swiss agricultural women's organisation

- Schweizerischer Bäuerinnen- und Landfrauenverband
- Abbreviation: SBLV
- Formation: 1932
- Type: Agricultural women's association
- Affiliations: Associated Country Women of the World (from 1935); Swiss Farmers' Union (from 1941)

The Swiss Association of Women Farmers and Rural Women (German: Schweizerischer Bäuerinnen- und Landfrauenverband, SBLV; French: Union suisse des paysannes et des femmes rurales) is a Swiss agricultural women's organisation. It goes back to the Swiss Association of Women Farmers (German: Schweizerischer Landfrauenverband; French: Union des paysannes suisses), created in 1932 by cantonal associations of women farmers, and took its present form in 2006.

== History ==
Protestant women farmers of the Swiss Plateau had been partly organised since 1918. The national association was founded in 1932 on the initiative of Lili Kohler-Burg, who had established the Aargau Rural Women's Association in 1929 and acted with the support of Ernst Laur, director of the Swiss Farmers' Union; it brought together the cantonal associations of Bern, Schaffhausen, Basel-Stadt, Basel-Landschaft, and Vaud.

Anna Schneider-Schnyder was the association's first president, and Augusta Gillabert-Randin its honorary president. Kohler-Burg herself served as president from 1939 to 1946, a term marked by the strengthening of the secretariat. The association joined the Associated Country Women of the World in 1935 and the Swiss Farmers' Union in 1941. From 1936 it had a secretariat, directed first by Marie Renfer and then by Mascha Oettli from 1942 to 1947. The Schweizerische Landfrauen-Zeitung, founded in 1930, did not establish itself as the association's organ, as most cantonal associations placed their announcements in local agricultural papers.

In 2006 the association merged with the Swiss Association of Catholic Women Farmers, founded in 1961, to form the Swiss Association of Women Farmers and Rural Women.

== Bibliography ==
- W. Baumann, P. Moser, Bauern im Industriestaat, 1999
- Schweizerischer Bäuerinnen- und Landfrauenverband, ed., Engagées ensemble depuis 90 ans 1932–2022, 2022

=== Archives ===
- Schweizerisches Bundesarchiv, Archiv Schweizerischer Bäuerinnen- und Landfrauenverband; Archiv Schweizerischer Verband Katholischer Bäuerinnen
