= Elisabeth Schneider-Schneiter =

Swiss politician

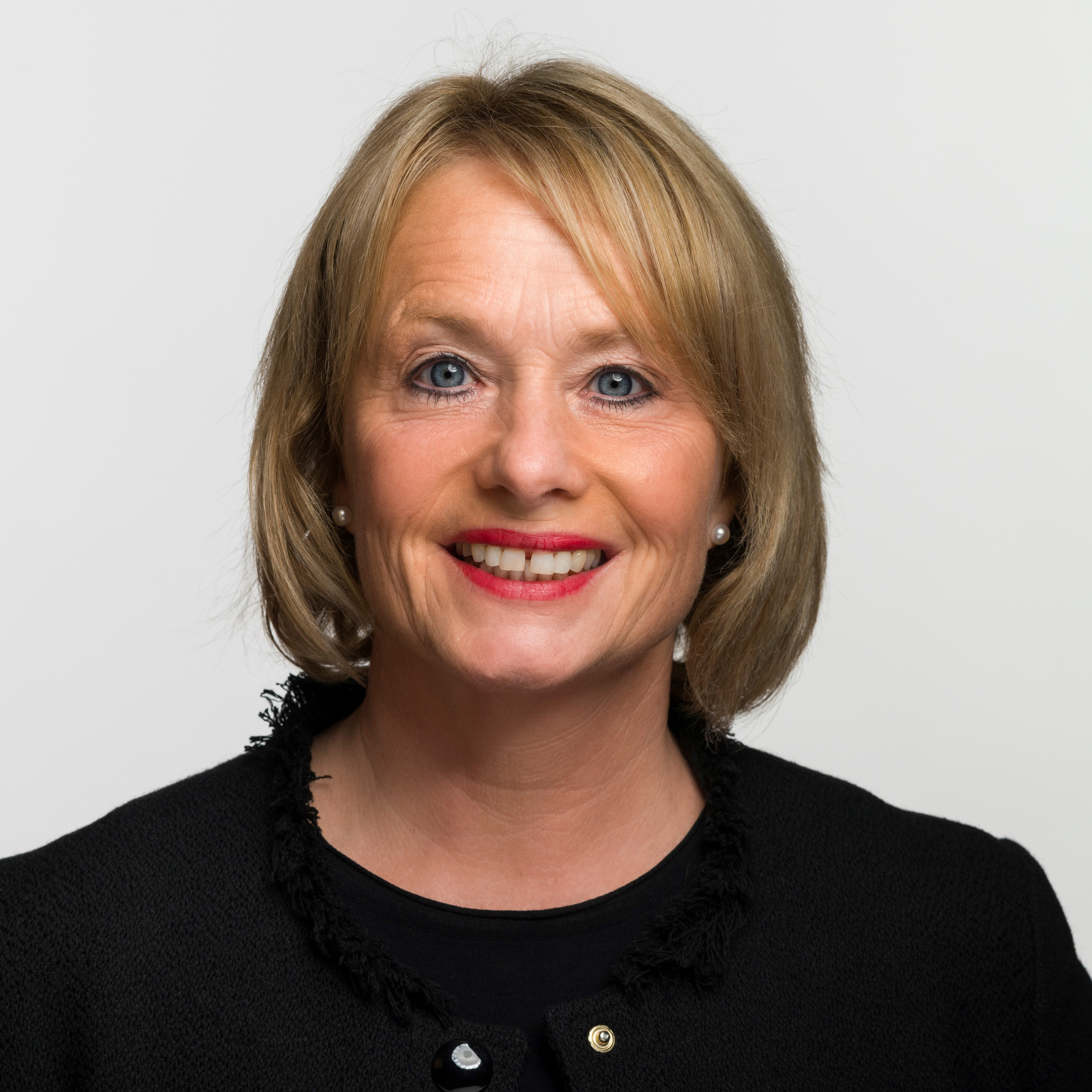

Member of the National Council of Switzerland
- Incumbent
- Assumed office November 2010

Personal details
- Born: 19 February 1964 (age 62) Basel, Switzerland
- Party: Christian Democratic People's Party of Switzerland

Elisabeth Schneider-Schneiter (born 19 February 1964) is a Swiss jurist and politician of The Centre (formerly known as the Christian Democratic People's Party).

== Political career ==
She has been a member of the parliament of the Canton Basel-Landschaft since 1999, over which she also presided in the term between 2006 and 2007. In November 2010, she replaced the resigning Kathrin Amacker in the National Council. She was also a member of the Parliamentary Assembly of the Council of Europe (PACE).

At the party conference of the CVP Baselland in October 2018, Schneider-Schneiter was nominated as a candidate for the successor of Doris Leuthard in the Federal Council. She would have been the first Federal Councillor from the Basel Landschaft in 123 years. However, the CVP later decided to present a two-person ticket with the National Councilor Viola Amherd of Canton Valais and the councilor of Uri Heidi Z’graggen for the Federal Council election. Eventually, Viola Amherd was elected into the Federal Council. In the Swiss parliamentary elections in 2019, Schneider-Schneiter was re-elected to the National Council rather comfortably as the CVP entered the elections within a political alliance with the Green Liberal Party (GLP) and the Evangelical People's Party (EVP).

== Further activities ==
Schneider-Schneiter is the President of the Chamber of Commerce of Basel and a member of the Board of Directors in the Economiesuisse. She is also a Member of the Board at Primeo Energy and the President of the European Youth Choir Festival.

== Personal life ==
She lives is married and has two children. Living in Biel-Benken, her places of origin are Basel, Lenzburg and Schwendibach.
