= Bregy (surname) =

Bregy is a surname. Notable people with the surname include:

- Björn Bregy (born 1974), Swiss kickboxer
- Georges Bregy (born 1958), Swiss footballer
- Philipp Matthias Bregy (born 1978), Swiss politician
