= Emilie Dettwyler-Jeker =

Swiss farmer and rural women's movement pioneer (1880–1951)

- Born: Emilie Jeker; 13 March 1880; Holderbank, Switzerland
- Died: 21 May 1951 (aged 71); Köniz, Switzerland
- Occupations: Farmer; editor; association leader
- Known for: Founding the first cantonal women farmers' association in Switzerland and the Schweizerische Landfrauen-Zeitung
- Spouse: Emil Dettwyler
- Children: 2

Emilie Dettwyler-Jeker, born Emilie Jeker (13 March 1880 – 21 May 1951), was a Swiss farmer, founder of the Schweizerische Landfrauen-Zeitung, and a pioneer of the rural women's movement. She established the first cantonal women farmers' association in Switzerland.

== Early life ==
Emilie Jeker was the daughter of Alois Jeker and Anna née Brunner, and grew up in a large family on the Alt-Bechburg farm near Holderbank. In 1900 she married the farmer Emil Dettwyler, with whom she had a daughter and a son. After some years on her father-in-law's farm, the couple bought the estate of the former Paradies convent in the Thurgau municipality of Schlatt in 1906, selling it again in 1918. The following year they acquired Herblingen Castle and its farm in the Schaffhausen municipality of Stetten.

== Egg marketing and the Schaffhausen association ==
Keeping several hundred hens, Dettwyler-Jeker began in 1926 to sell her neighbours' eggs as well. In order to create outlets for direct sales, she founded in 1928 the Kantonaler landwirtschaftlicher Frauenverein Schaffhausen, renamed Bäuerinnenvereinigung Schaffhausen in 1932 — the first cantonal women farmers' association in Switzerland — which she chaired until 1931. Its aim was to counter middlemen and the competition of imported eggs from large German producers. The women farmers delivered some 60,000 to 70,000 eggs a year to the Schaffhausen cantonal hospital and the cantonal psychiatric clinic at Breitenau. For their stall at the weekly market in the town of Schaffhausen they worked with the cantonal farmers' association, whose van carried the eggs. Regarded in many places as outdated, the market proved an effective and timely form of distribution, allowing the Schaffhausen women farmers to sell some 550,000 eggs in 1935.

A frequent speaker, Dettwyler-Jeker addressed the first Swiss Exhibition of Women's Work (SAFFA) at Bern in 1928, the countrywomen's day at Herzogenbuchsee in 1929, and various conferences in the canton of Bern, encouraging the creation of local women farmers' associations.

== Schweizerische Landfrauen-Zeitung ==
In 1930 Dettwyler-Jeker founded the weekly Schweizerische Landfrauen-Zeitung, for which she wrote most of the articles. It appeared as a supplement to the Bauernfreund from 1941 to 1944, which brought it a wider readership, and ceased publication thereafter.

Although the engagement of women farmers in training, economic affairs, and social policy had an emancipatory character in its early years, Dettwyler-Jeker distanced herself from the notion of emancipation, preferring to speak of self-help and self-education. In her articles she stressed the heavy workload borne by women on farms through the combination of household and agricultural work, and called for recognition of the economic importance of their contribution. Like other pioneers of the movement such as Augusta Gillabert-Randin, Lili Kohler-Burg, and Rosa Neuenschwander, she contributed decisively to overcoming the agricultural crisis of the 1930s by increasing production both for the market and for household consumption.

== Later life ==
After her husband's death in 1941, Dettwyler-Jeker sold Herblingen Castle, which she bought back at auction in 1950, and moved to Winterthur. She spent the last years of her life with her son at Köniz.

== Bibliography ==
- P. Moser, "Mehr Selbstversorgung und mehr Produktion für den Markt. Die Überlebensstrategie der Bäuerinnen in der Zwischenkriegszeit", in Schweizerische Gesellschaft für Wirtschafts- und Sozialgeschichte, 15, 1998, 63–79
- Verband Schaffhauser Landfrauen, ed., 75 Jahre Verband Schaffhauser Landfrauen VSL, 2003
- C. Morgenthaler, "'Was wir wollen, ist keine Emanzipation; es ist Selbsthilfe und Selbstbildung.' Die Anfänge der Landfrauenbewegung in der Schweiz", master's thesis, University of Basel, 2023
- P. Moser, "Die Bäuerin. Einst Dreh- und Angelpunkt der Arbeiten auf dem Bauernhof. Veränderungen des bäuerlichen Familienbetriebs im 19./20. Jahrhundert", in E. Bäschlin, S. Contzen et al., eds., Von Bäuerinnen, Landwirtinnen und Betriebsleiterinnen. Beiträge zu Frauen in der Landwirtschaft, 2025, 17–44

=== Archives ===
- Archiv Gosteli-Stiftung, Worblaufen, Archiv Schweizerischer Landfrauenverband (SLFV)
