= Martin Pfister =

Swiss Federal Councillor since 2025

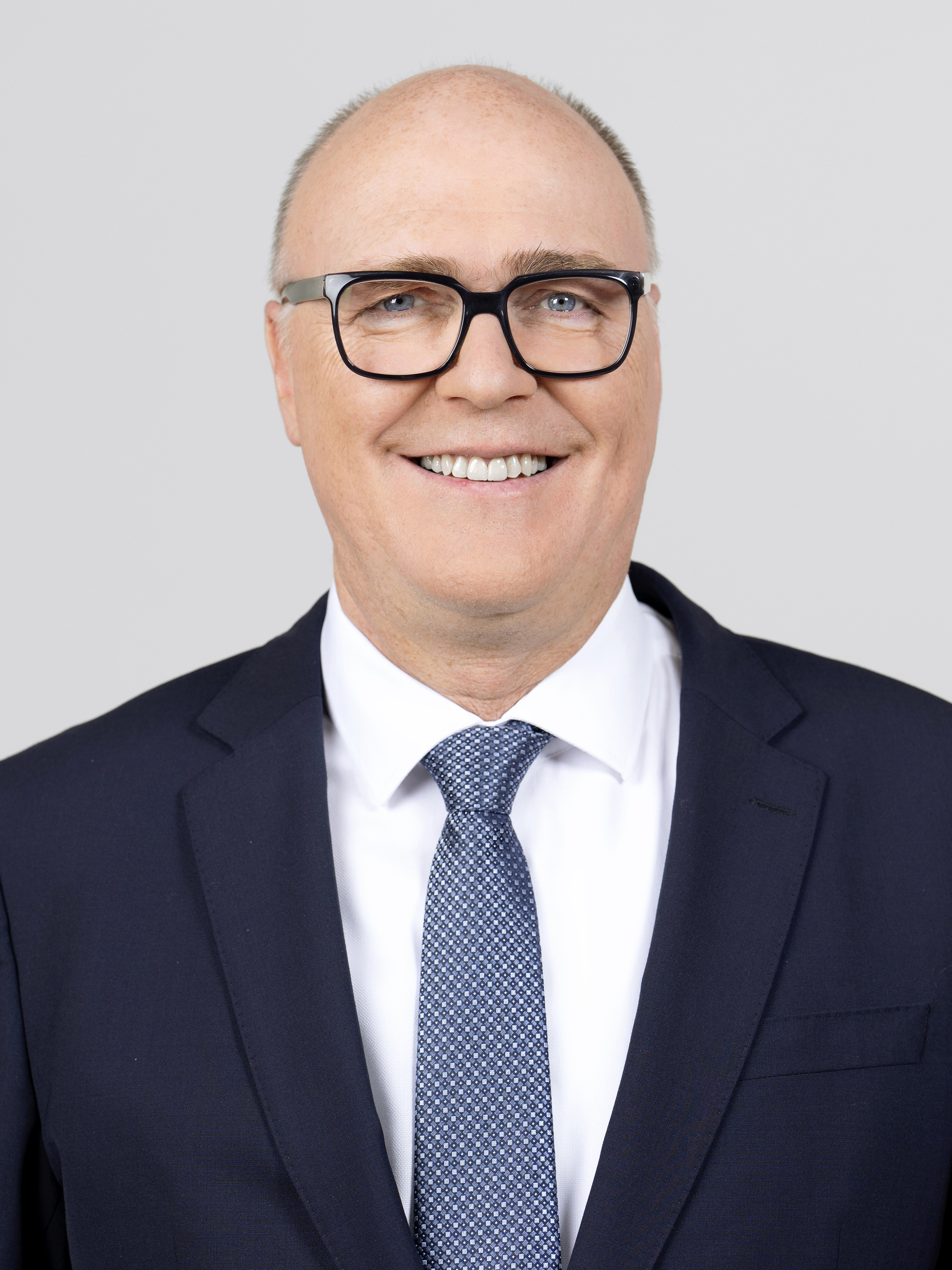
- Official portrait, 2026

Swiss Federal Councillor
- Incumbent
- Assumed office 1 April 2025
- Department: Federal Department of Defence, Civil Protection and Sport
- Preceded by: Viola Amherd

Member of the Executive Council of Zug
- In office 17 January 2016 – 31 March 2025
- Directorate: Health

Personal details
- Pronunciation: Swiss Standard German pronunciation: [ˈmartiːn ˈpfɪstər]
- Born: Martin Pfister; 31 July 1963 (age 63) Zug, Switzerland
- Party: The Centre
- Spouse: Cacilda Giacometti Pfister
- Children: 4
- Education: History; German studies
- Alma mater: University of Fribourg
- Occupation: Historian; teacher
- Website: Executive Council website Official website

Military service
- Allegiance: Switzerland
- Branch/service: Swiss Army
- Rank: Oberst (Colonel)

Martin Pfister (Swiss Standard German pronunciation: [ˈmartiːn ˈpfɪstər]; born 31 July 1963) is a Swiss historian and politician of the Centre who has served as a Federal Councillor since 2025, heading the Federal Department of Defence, Civil Protection and Sport.

A trained teacher and an Oberst in the Swiss Army, having served for eight years in disaster response, he previously served as a Regierungsrat (Cantonal Minister) of Zug from 2016 to 2025, responsible for the health department.

== Early life and education ==
Pfister was born 31 July 1963 in Zug, Switzerland, the oldest of three children, to Paul O. Pfister (1934–2004), a historian and editor of the catholic-conservative daily newspaper Zuger Nachrichten.

He was raised in Allenwinden where he attended the local schools. Pfister completed the teachers seminary St. Michael in Zug to become a primary school teacher in 1984.

Between 1988 and 1996, Pfister studied History and German Studies at the University of Fribourg, graduating with a Licentiate degree. He wrote his thesis about Philipp Etter, who also served as member of the Federal Council (Switzerland) from Zug. Despite the recommendation of his professor, Pfister chose not to pursue an academic career.

== Political career ==
Pfister's political career began with his election into the Cantonal Council (Kantonsrat) of Zug in 2006, an office he held until 2016. From 2009 until 2012, he held the role of party leader (Fraktionschef) of the CVP in Zug. In the by-elections of 17 January 2016 for the Executive Council (Regierungsrat) of the Canton of Zug, Pfister was elected to fill the vacancy of Peter Hegglin. He led the health department of Zug from 2016 to 2025. As the head of the Conference of Central Swiss Health Directors, Pfister had a prominent role in the response to the COVID-19 pandemic. He won the most votes of any candidate in the 2022 Executive Council elections.

In 2025, Pfister was elected into the Federal Council to replace Viola Amherd. His taking over the leadership of the Federal Department of Defence, Civil Protection and Sport was expected and officially confirmed in the redistribution of departments amongst Federal Councillors two days after the election. Initially, Pfister's opponent Markus Ritter was seen as the favorite, having far more influence in national politics. Pfister announced his candidacy at the last moment and spent several days in private afterwards, leading to him being described as an "alibi candidate". During his campaign, he focused on large geopolitical issues, often answering questions hesitantly or with "there I pull the joker". In contrast to Ritter, who aggressively presented himself as a problem-solver, Pfister spoke slowly and calmly.

== Political positions ==
Pfister is against loosening the debt brake, instead preferring to increase revenue by raising the value added tax. His positions were described in the Neue Zürcher Zeitung (NZZ) as "liberal in social and economic questions".

Pfister's colleagues on the Executive Council in Zug have described him as "very collegial", with political opponents praising his openness to discussion. However, his readiness to compromise was also criticized as lacking decisiveness, a quality described by the NZZ as "an embodiment of The Centre like no other".

== Personal life ==
Pfister is married to Cacilda Giacometti Pfister. Together, they parent a patchwork family with four children.

As a young man, Pfister was active in the scouts (Pfadi) in Baar with the scout name Hecht, 'Pike'. During his military service, he attended officer school in Wangen an der Aare, where he was noted for his physical resilience, once even carrying two backpacks.

Pfister resides in Allenwinden.

Political offices
Preceded by Viola Amherd	Member of the Swiss Federal Council; 2025–present	Incumbent
Preceded by Viola Amherd	Head of the Department of Defence, Civil Protection and Sport; 2025–present	Incumbent
