= 1942 Swiss referendums =

Two referendums were held in Switzerland during 1942. The first was held on 25 January on a popular initiative that would provide for the direct election of the Federal Council, as well as increasing the number of members. It was rejected by voters. The second was held on 3 May "for the reorganisation of the National Council", and was also rejected.

== Background ==
The referendums were both popular initiatives, which required a double majority; a majority of the popular vote and majority of the cantons as they implied a change to the Constitution. The decision of each canton was based on the vote in that canton. Full cantons counted as one vote, whilst half cantons counted as half.

== Results ==
=== January referendum ===
Choice	Popular vote		Cantons		
Choice	Votes	%	Full	Half	Total
For	251,605	32.4	0	0	0
Against	524,127	67.6	19	6	22
Blank votes	13,381	–	–	–	–
Invalid votes	3,311	–	–	–	–
Total	792,424	100	19	6	22
Registered voters/turnout	1,278,688	62.0	–	–	–
Source: Nohlen & Stöver

=== May referendum ===
Choice	Popular vote		Cantons		
Choice	Votes	%	Full	Half	Total
For	219,629	34.9	0	1	0.5
Against	408,821	65.1	19	5	21.5
Blank votes	30,543	–	–	–	–
Invalid votes	1,825	–	–	–	–
Total	660,818	100	19	6	22
Registered voters/turnout	1,283,487	51.5	–	–	–
Source: Nohlen & Stöver
