= Nause =

Nause is a German-based surname:

- Franz Nause (1903–1943), Social democratic resistance fighter
- Gudrun Nause (1940–2018), Member of Volkskammer for the DFD
- Martha Nause (born 1954), American golfer
- Reto Nause (born 1971), Swiss trade unionist and politician

== See also ==
- Nause (band), Swedish electronic music duo
