= Popular Initiative: "Election of the Federal Council by the People and Increase in the Number of Members" =

Swiss popular initiative on electing the Federal Council rejected in 1942

- 25 January 1942
- Federal popular initiative
- Outcome: Rejected

Results
Choice	Votes	%
Yes	251,605	32.43%
No	524,127	67.57%
Valid votes	775,732	97.89%
Invalid or blank votes	16,692	2.11%
Total votes	792,424	100.00%
Registered voters/turnout	1,278,688	61.97%%

The federal popular initiative "Election of the Federal Council by the People and Increase in the Number of Members" was a popular initiative in Switzerland, rejected by both the people and the cantons on January 25, 1942.

== Proposal ==
The initiative proposed amending Articles 95 and 96 of the Federal Constitution of Switzerland in order to increase the number of members of the Federal Council from seven to nine.

At the same time, the initiative requests that these members be elected by the people for a four-year term. At least three members were to come from Latin-speaking regions and at least five from German-speaking regions.

The full text of the initiative can be consulted on the website of the Federal Chancellery.

== Procedure ==
=== Historical background ===
When the Federal Constitution was adopted in 1848 and revised in 1874, the Radical Democratic Party, which held a large majority, established the election system for both the federal chambers and the Federal Council in a way that favored the party already in power.

Following the introduction of the federal popular initiative in 1891, opposition parties, led by the Social Democratic Party of Switzerland, sought to change this system.

They made a first attempt by submitting two initiatives. One proposed introducing proportional representation for elections to the National Council, while the other called for the popular election of the Federal Council and an increase in its membership.

Both initiatives were rejected on November 4, 1900 by 58.75% and 58.81% of voters, respectively.

Following this vote, the Federal Council repeatedly opposed expanding its membership in 1909, 1912, and 1914. The idea of electing the Council by popular vote was largely abandoned by the federal authorities.

During the Federal Council election of 15 December 1938, the Social Democratic Party demanded a seat in government. After Parliament refused, the party launched this initiative to expand the Council and ensure both linguistic and political representation.

=== Signature collection and submission of the initiative ===
The collection of the required 50 000 signatures began on February 12, 1939. On July 29, the initiative was submitted to the Swiss Federal Chancellery, which declared it valid on September 18.

=== Discussions and recommendations of the authorities ===
Both the Federal Assembly and the Federal Council recommended rejecting the initiative. ·

In its message to Parliament, the government argued that increasing the size of the Federal Council would threaten its unity and cohesion. It also emphasized the difficulties and risks associated with popular elections, particularly the risk that the German-speaking majority might overwhelmingly support German-speaking candidates, thereby limiting minority representation.

=== Vote ===
The initiative was submitted to a popular vote on 25 and was rejected by all 19 6/2 cantons and by 67.6% of valid votes cast.

== Effects ==
After this popular rejection, the issue of electing the Federal Council by the people periodically returned to public debate. The Socialist Party gained access to the government in 1959 when two seats were given to it through the Magic formula.

In the first decade of the 21st century, the Swiss People's Party, located on the opposite end of the political spectrum, proposed a similar reform through a federal popular initiative. Signature collection was planned to begin in the summer of 2010.

This proposal called for a seven-member Federal Council, including two representatives from linguistic minorities, elected by majority vote for four-year terms.
