= Philipp Matthias Bregy =

Swiss politician (born 1978)

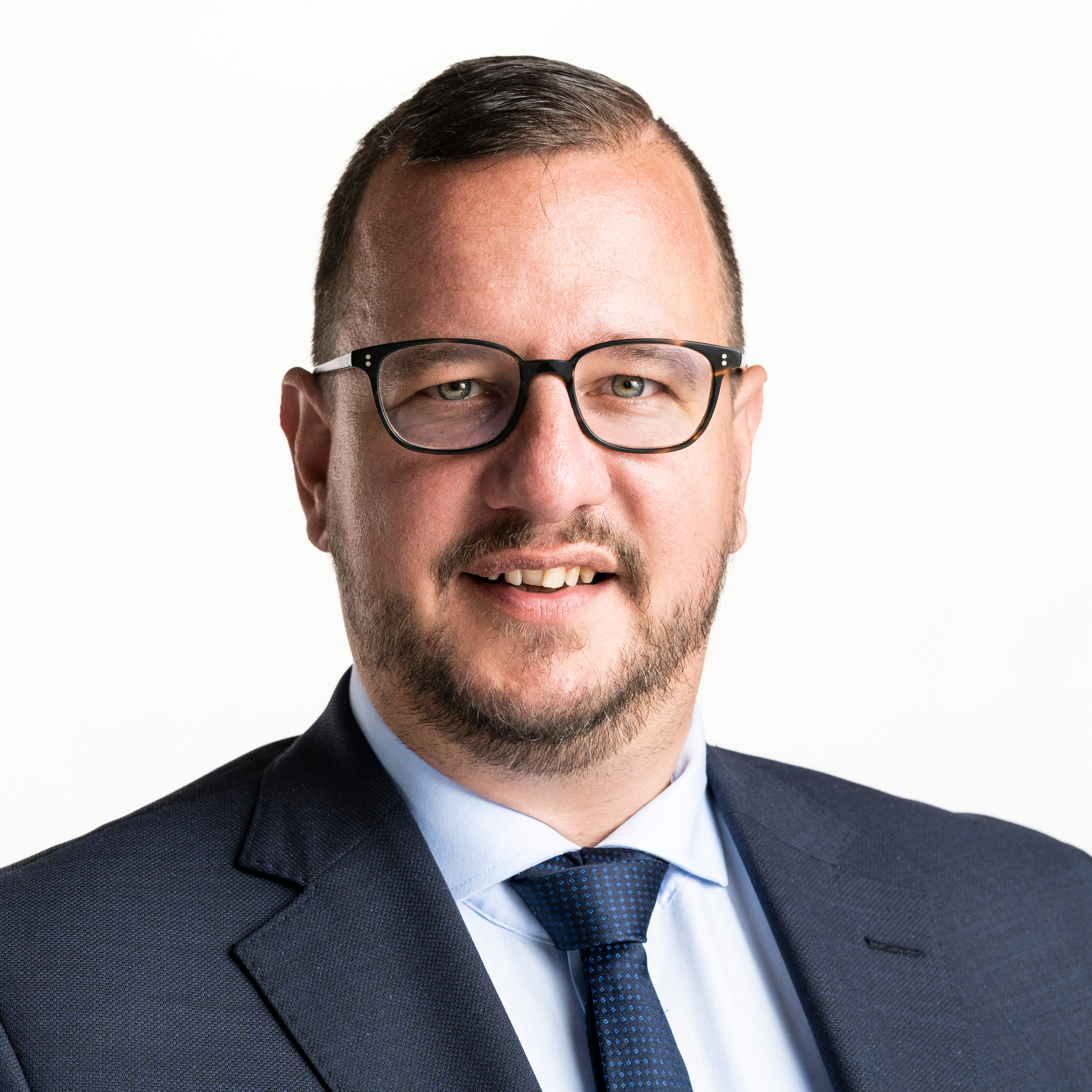
- Official portrait, 2021

Member of the National Council (Switzerland)
- Incumbent
- Assumed office 4 March 2019
- Preceded by: Viola Amherd

Head of The Centre in the National Council (Fraktionschef)
- Incumbent
- Assumed office 21 May 2021
- Preceded by: Andrea Gmür-Schönenberger

Personal details
- Born: 7 July 1978 (age 48) Visp, Switzerland
- Party: The Centre
- Spouse: Nathalie Schaller (m. 2014)
- Children: 2
- Education: University of Bern
- Occupation: Lawyer
- Website: Official website Parliament website

Military service
- Allegiance: Switzerland
- Branch/service: Swiss Army
- Rank: Major

Philipp Matthias Bregy (German pronunciation: [ˈbʁeːɡi]; BRAY-gee; born 7 July 1978) is a Swiss lawyer and politician who serves as member of the National Council (Switzerland) for The Centre since 2019. In 2021, he was elected as the leader (Fraktionschef) of the delegation of The Centre in the National Council. On 28 June 2025, Bregy was elected president of The Centre, succeeding Gerhard Pfister.

== Early life and education ==
Bregy was born 7 July 1978 in Visp, Switzerland, to Edelbert W. Bregy (born 1946), a visual artist, and Ursula Bregy (née Kreuzer). He has a brother. Between 1985–1993 he attended the local schools in Naters before he completed his Matura at the Lycée-collège Spiritus Sanctus, a Catholic high school, in Brig.

Between 1998 and 2004, Bregy completed Law studies at the University of Bern. In 2004, he graduated with a Master of Laws from same institution.

== Personal life ==
On 14 October 2014, Bregy married Nathalie Schaller, a pharmacist. They have two children. He resides in Naters.
