= Gerhard Pfister =

Swiss politician (born 1962)

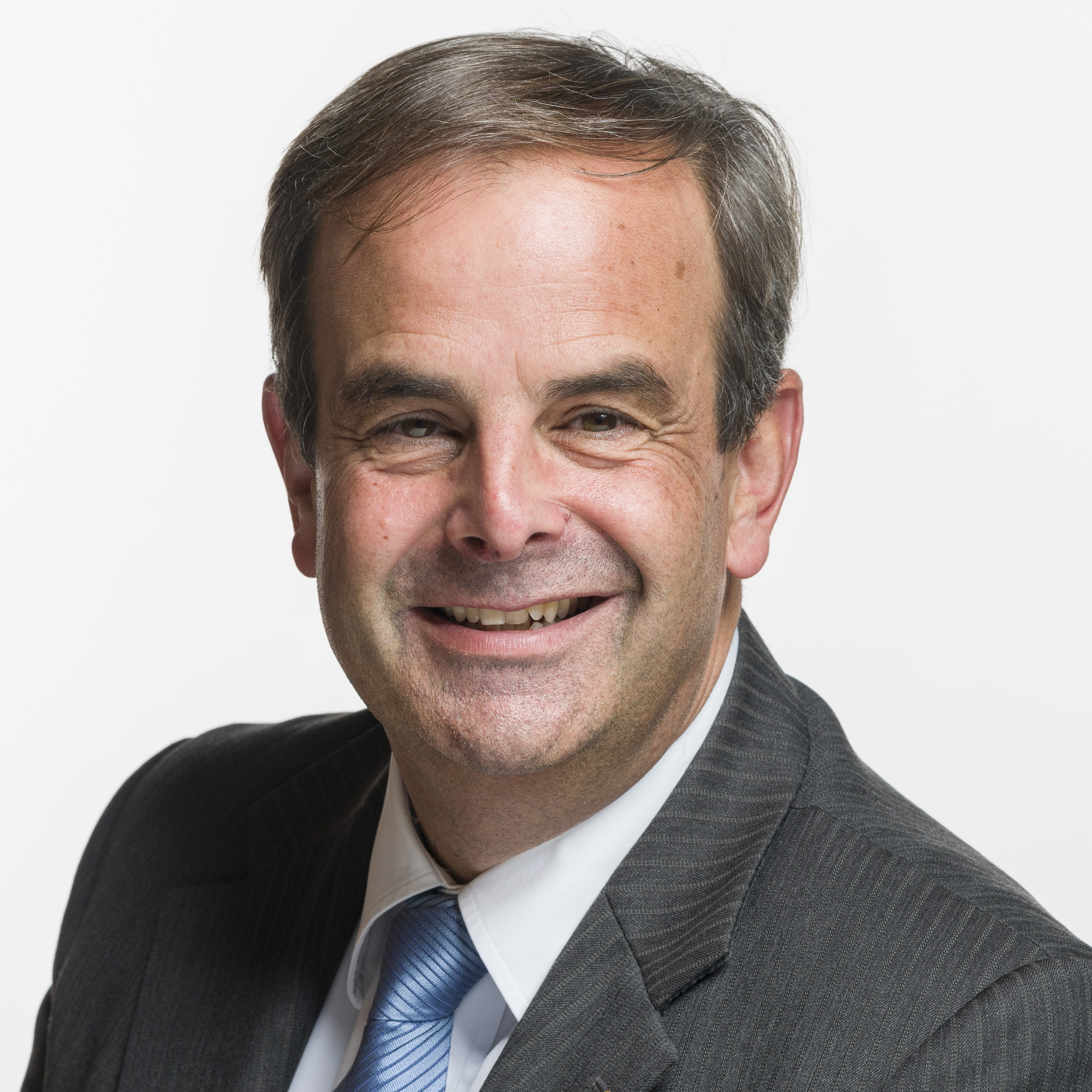
- Official portrait, 2019

Member of the National Council (Switzerland)
- Incumbent
- Assumed office 1 December 2003
- Constituency: Canton of Zug

President of The Centre
- Incumbent
- Assumed office 23 April 2016
- Preceded by: Christophe Darbellay

Personal details
- Born: Gerhard Michael Pfister; 1 October 1962 (age 63) Zug, Switzerland
- Party: The Centre
- Other political affiliations: Christian Democratic People's Party (until 2020)
- Spouse: Franziska Bachmann (m. 1994)
- Education: Disentis Abbey School
- Alma mater: University of Fribourg
- Website: Official website (in German)

Gerhard Michael Pfister (born 1 October 1962) is a Swiss educator and politician who currently serves as a member of the National Council for The Centre (previously Christian Democratic People's Party) since 2003. In 2016, he succeeded Christophe Darbellay as president of The Centre. Pfister is currently also co-president of the Swiss Private School Association and founder and controlling shareholder of the day school Elementa Zug which is deemed for highly gifted children.

== Early life and education ==
Pfister was born 1 October 1962 in Zug, Switzerland, to Dietmar Pfister (1928–1994) and Marliese Pfister (née André; 1936–1970). He lost his mother when he was only eight years old. His parents operated the private boarding school Institute Dr. Pfister in Oberägeri, which was operative from 1920 to 2012. He studied there before moving on to Disentis Abbey school. He studied philosophy and literature at the University of Fribourg.

== Career ==
He taught at the school and took over operations after the death of his father in 1994. The school closed in 2012. He currently is the co-president of the Swiss Private School Association.

== Politics ==
In 1998, he was elected to the Cantonal Council of Zug where he served through 2003. He then became the party president in Zug in 1999, a position he held until 2008. He won a seat in the National Council in 2003. He was re-elected in 2007 and 2011. In January 2025, Pfister announced he would step down as the Centre Party's leader later in the year.

== Personal life ==
Since 1994 Pfister has been married to Franziska (née Bachmann), who is also a teacher and educator.
