= Tim Frey =

Swiss politician and a political consultant

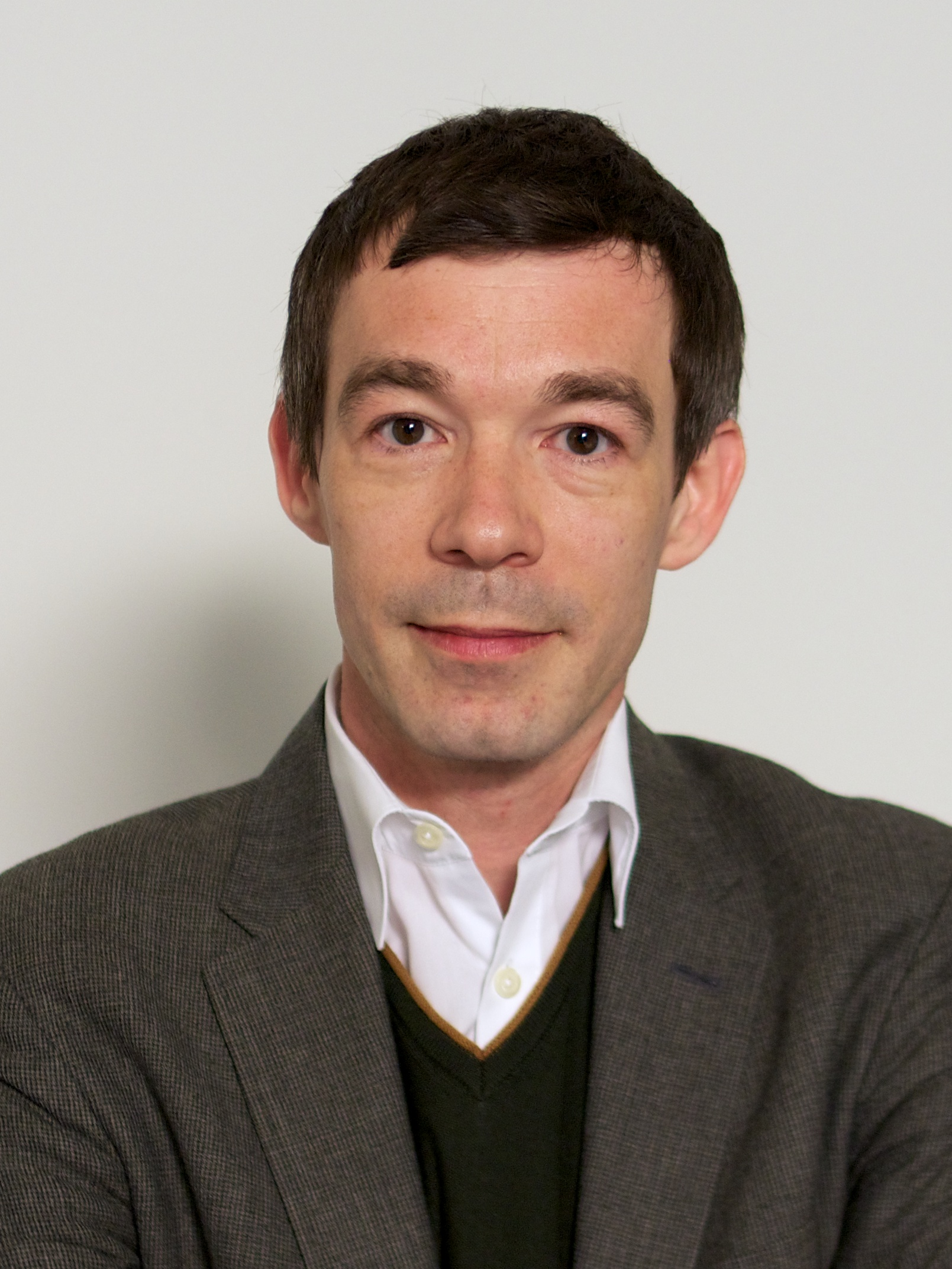
Tim Frey 2014

Timotheos "Tim" Frey (born 19 September 1972) is a Swiss politician and a political consultant. From February 2009 to June 2012, he was the secretary general of the Christian Democratic People's Party (CVP/PDC).

== Career ==
Since October 2018, Tim Frey is partner and member of the executive board of Farner Ltd., a Swiss PR agency.

From 2013 to 2018 he led the public affairs division of the public relations firm Burson-Marsteller Switzerland. From early 2009 to June 2012, Frey has been secretary general of the CVP/PDC. Prior to taking up that post he was researcher and teaching assistant at the Institute of political science at the University of Zurich.

== Education ==
Frey earned his degree in political science from the University of Geneva in 2002 and his Ph.D. degree in political science from the University of Zurich in 2008. Prior to his academic career, Frey did an apprenticeship as interior designer.

== Selected publications ==
- Frey, Timotheos, 2009. Die Christdemokratie in Westeuropa – Der schmale Grat zum Erfolg. Nomos, Baden-Baden.
- Kriesi, Hanspeter, Edgar Grande, Romain Lachat, Martin Dolezal, Simon Bornschier and Timotheos Frey, 2008. West European politics in the age of globalization. Cambridge University Press, Cambridge 2008.
