= Reto Nause =

Swiss politician (born 1971)

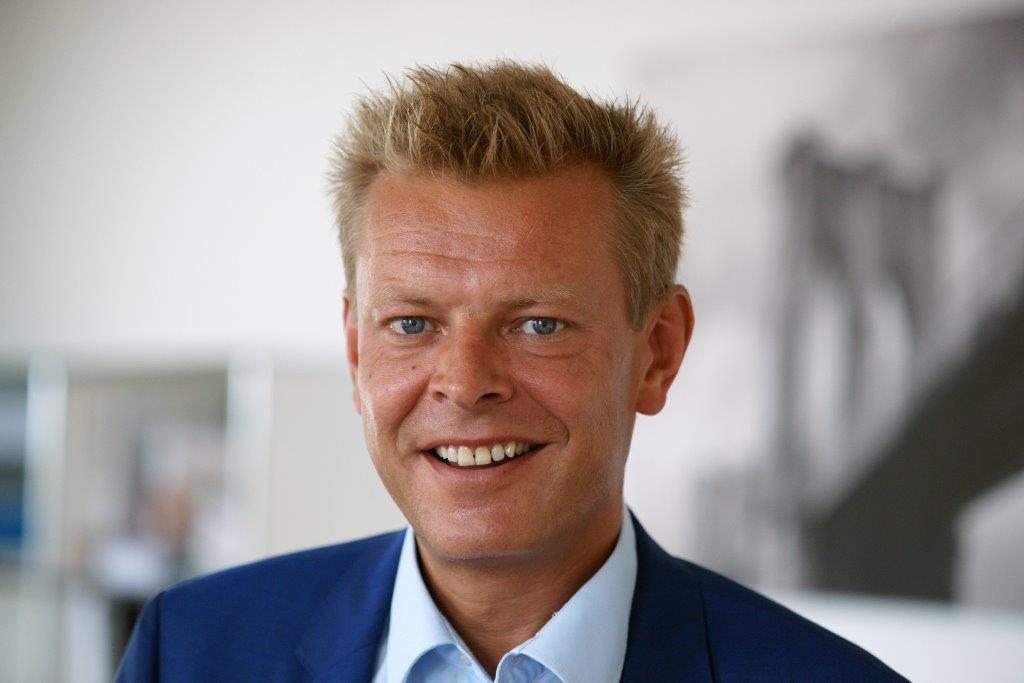
- Campaign portrait, 2023

Member of the National Council (Switzerland)
- Incumbent
- Assumed office 4 December 2023
- Constituency: Canton of Bern

Personal details
- Born: Reto Nause; 17 June 1971 (age 54); Birmenstorf, Aargau, Switzerland
- Political party: The Centre
- Spouse: Sandra Wüthrich
- Children: 2
- Website: Official website Parliament website

Reto Nause (German pronunciation: [ˈreːto ˈnaʊzə]; born 17 June 1971) is a Swiss trade unionist and politician who currently serves on the National Council (Switzerland) since 2023 for The Centre.

== Early life and education ==
Nause was born on 17 June 1971 in Birmenstorf, Switzerland, to German-born Walter Nause (1933–2014) and Marlies Nause (née Lehmann; 1941–2018). His father was German and his mother was Swiss. Nause himself is a dual citizen.

== Politics ==
He served on the City Council of Bern since 2009. During the 2019 Swiss federal election he was not elected into National Council, however he was in 2023. He assumed office as member of the National Council (Switzerland) on 4 December 2023.

== Personal life ==
Nause is married to Sandra Wüthrich and has two sons; Louis and Henry.
