= Christian Democratic People's Party of Switzerland =

Former Swiss political party

Christian Democratic People's Party of Switzerland: Christlichdemokratische Volkspartei (German); Parti démocrate-chrétien (French); Partito Popolare Democratico (Italian); Partida Cristiandemocratica (Romansh)
- President: Gerhard Pfister
- Vice Presidents: Ida Glanzmann; Charles Juillard
- General Secretary: Gianna Luzio
- Member in Federal Council: Viola Amherd
- Founded: 22 April 1912
- Dissolved: 31 December 2020
- Merged into: The Centre
- Headquarters: Hirschengraben 9 CH-3011 Bern
- Youth wing: Young CVP
- Membership (2015): 100,000
- Ideology: Christian democracy Social conservatism Conservatism; Social market economy
- Political position: Centre to centre-right
- European affiliation: European People's Party (associate)
- International affiliation: Centrist Democrat International; Historical: White International
- Colours: Orange

The Christian Democratic People's Party of Switzerland (German: Christlichdemokratische Volkspartei der Schweiz, CVP), also called the Christian Democratic Party (French: Parti démocrate-chrétien, PDC), Democratic People's Party (Italian: Partito Popolare Democratico, PPD) and Swiss Christian Democratic Party (Romansh: Partida cristiandemocratica Svizra), PCD), was a Christian democratic political party in Switzerland. On 1 January 2021, it merged with the Conservative Democratic Party of Switzerland (BDP/PBD) to form The Centre, which now operates at the federal level. The name Christian Democratic People's Party (CVP) was used by some cantonal and regional organisations until 2024. Its seats in the Federal Assembly were transferred to the new party, as was its sole seat on the Federal Council.

The party was founded as the Catholic Conservative Party in 1912. It peaked in the 1950s, having three members of the Federal Council (1954–1958) before agreeing to the magic formula. It adopted its current name in 1970. From 1979 to 2003, the party's vote declined, mostly in the favour of the Swiss People's Party (SVP/UDC); the party was reduced to one Federal Councillor at the 2003 Federal Council election.

The party sat in the centre to centre-right of the political spectrum, advocating Christian democracy, the social market economy and moderate social conservatism. The party was strongest in Catholic rural areas, particularly Central Switzerland and Valais.

== History ==
The Catholic-Conservative Party of Switzerland (German: Katholisch-Konservative Partei der Schweiz) was founded in 1912. From 1919 on, the party occupied two out of the seven seats in the cabinet. Aided by the political climate of the postwar period, the party experienced its peak in the 1950s: It was represented by the biggest parliamentary delegation in the Federal Council, and from 1954 to 1958 the party occupied three out of seven seats in the cabinet. Nonetheless, the party had to relinquish the third seat in favor of the 'magic formula', which was introduced to the cabinet in 1959. In 1957 it changed its name to the Conservative-Christian-Social People's Party (German: Konservativ-Christlichsoziale Volkspartei) and to its current name in 1970. In the ensuing decades, the Catholic voter base dissolved somewhat. The reduction of the voter base, in addition to less cohesion among politicians in the party, led to six successive losses in federal elections after 1980.

The party lost its support over a number of years. Beginning in the 1990s, conservative voters from former strongholds of the CVP switched to vote for the right-wing populist Swiss People's Party. From the 1995 election to the 2019 election, the CVP's vote share decreased from 16.8% to 11.4%. After the 2003 election, Ruth Metzler of the CVP, was replaced by Christoph Blocher of the Swiss People's Party on the Federal Council, leaving the CVP with only one seat in the country's executive.

CVP President Gerhard Pfister and BDP President Martin Landolt, the leader of the Conservative Democratic Party, had ongoing discussions about a merger throughout 2020. In 2020, Pfister announced that the national CVP would undergo a change in branding with a new name and logo as part of a merger with the BDP. The party proposed to change the name to "The Center" or "The Alliance of the Center" (German: Die Mitte, CVP; French: Le Centre, PDC; Italian: il Centro, PPD; Romansh: il Center) which is the name of the parliamentary group that the CVP shares with the other center-right parties, the Conservative Democratic Party of Switzerland and the Evangelical People's Party of Switzerland. The merger was ratified by a vote of the entire party in November 2020. Cantonal parties were not required to adopt the new name if they do not wish to do so. Pfister estimated that a new center-right party could obtain up to 20% of the vote in future elections.

== Platform ==
In its party platform, the CVP described itself as a centrist party. The CVP fostered a social market economy in which a balance is struck between economic liberalism and social justice. The expansion of the party in the Protestant-dominated cantons, in which the CVP uphold rather centrist policies, stands in contrast to the traditional role of the CVP as the leading party in rather Catholic-dominated cantons of central Switzerland and the cantons of Valais. There, the electorate was mostly socially conservative.

The CVP had three main policies in the political centre:

- The CVP uphold the social market economy. It supports exporting industries and more spending on education, research and development. It also aims at combating the black market and tax evasion. In order to increase efficiency and incentives, the CVP calls for the reduction and streamlining of bureaucratic procedures and government agencies, low taxation for family enterprises and those who offer vocational education and internships. The CVP calls for equal wages and job opportunities for both men and women.
- The CVP called for flexible working times, childcare and affordable housing.
- The CVP aimed at ensuring social security. The CVP calls for reforms of the social security system, by raising taxes on demerit goods (e.g. tobacco taxes) to generate more revenues for the pension funds. The retirement age of 65 should also be upheld. The public health care system should be streamlined by a reduction of waiting times of medical procedures in order to ensure equitable services. The CVP also promotes workfare as the primary means to combat unemployment.

== Popular support ==
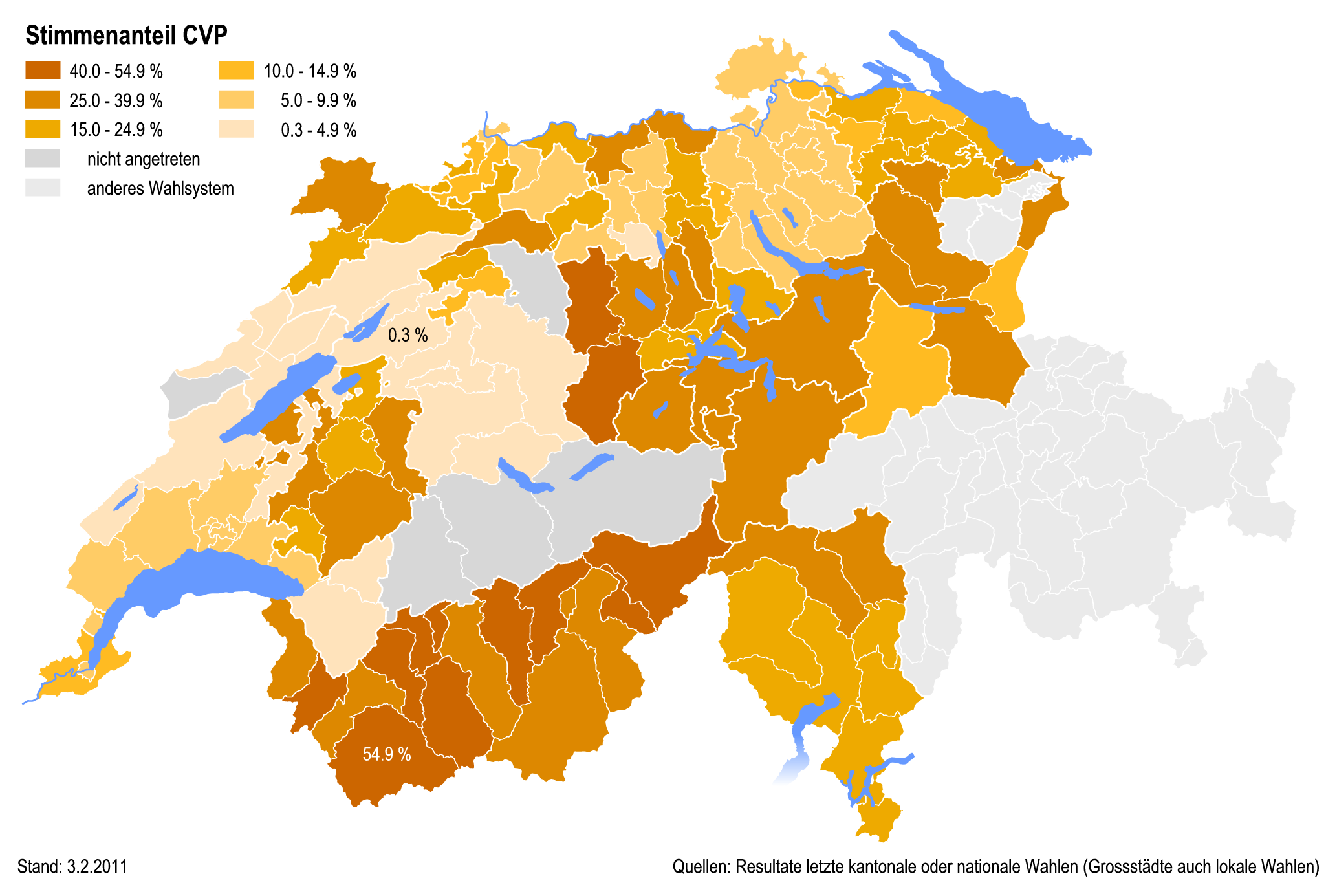
Percentages of the CVP at district level in 2011

The Christian Democrats are the largest party in Catholic southern and central Switzerland, and are the largest party in seven cantonal legislatures (coloured orange above).

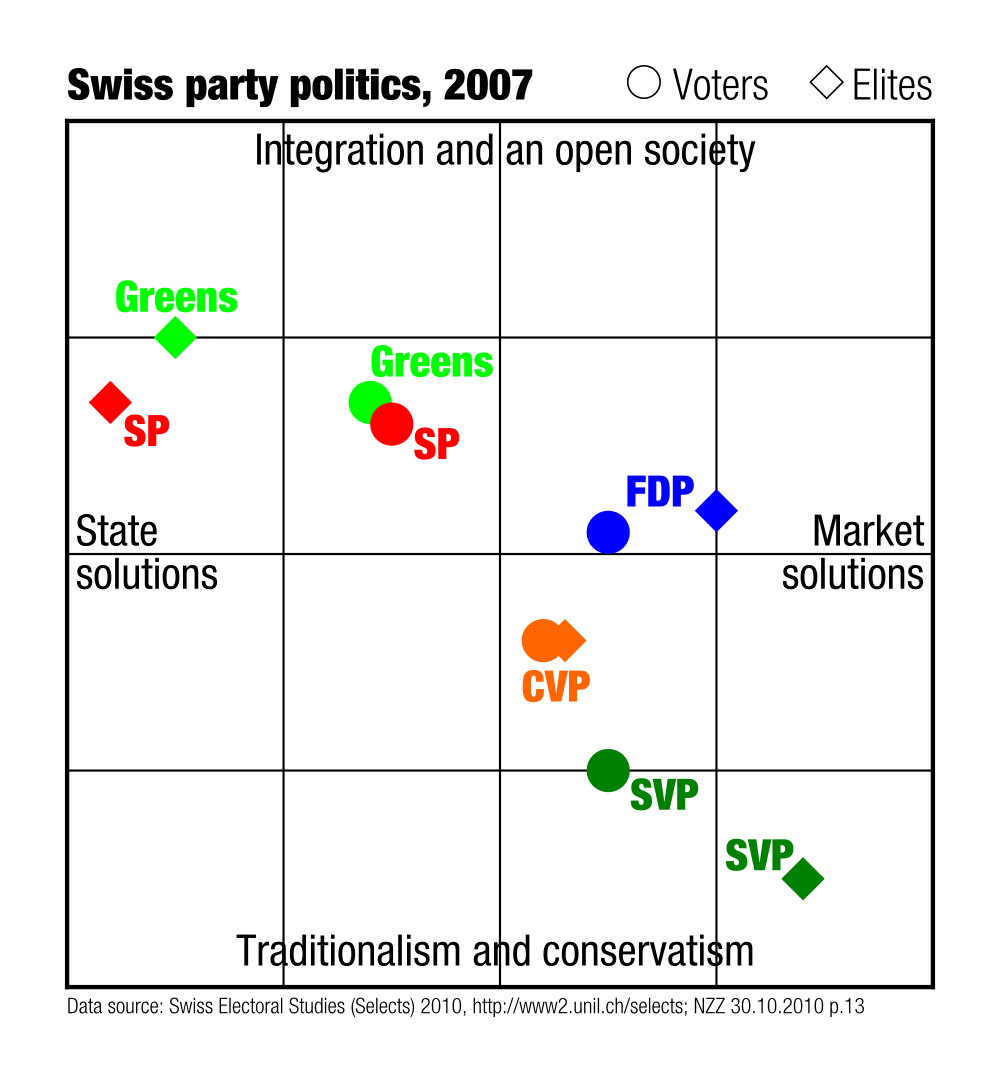
The CVP's positions in the Swiss political spectrum (2007). Positions of voters and of party elites (elected officials) are shown separately. Data from the 2007 general election.

Following continuing losses in the federal parliamentary elections until 2003, in December 2003, the party lost one of its two seats in the four-party coalition government, the Swiss Federal Council, to the Swiss People's Party. The CVP holds roughly 12% of the popular vote.

After the national election in late 2003, it held 28 seats (out of 200) in the Swiss National Council (first chamber of the Swiss parliament); 15 (out of 46) in the Council of States (second chamber, and the largest party in this chamber) and 1 out of 7 seats in the Swiss Federal Council (executive body).

In 2005, it held 20.7% of the seats in the Swiss Cantonal governments and 16.7% in the Swiss Cantonal parliaments (index "BADAC", weighted with the population and number of seats). At the last legislative national elections, 22 October 2007, the party won 14.6% of the popular vote and 31 out of 200 seats in the National Council lower house. This was a gain of 3 seats, ending the long-term decline of the party. It was also only one of the four largest parties besides the Swiss People's Party to gain votes and seats.

In the Federal Assembly, the CVP formerly sat in a bloc in the Christian Democrats/EPP/glp Group, along with the Evangelical People's Party and Green Liberal Party.

== Election results ==
=== National Council ===
Election	Votes	%	Seats	+/–
1914	71,668	21.1 (#2)	37 / 189	
1917	84,784	16.4 (#3)	42 / 189	▲5
1919	156,702	21.0 (#3)	41 / 189	▼1
1922	153,836	20.9 (#3)	44 / 198	▲3
1925	155,467	20.9 (#3)	42 / 198	▼2
1928	172,516	21.4 (#3)	46 / 198	▲4
1931	184,602	21.4 (#3)	44 / 187	▼2
1935	185,052	20.3 (#3)	42 / 187	▼2
1939	105,018	17.0 (#3)	43 / 187	▼1
1943	182,916	20.8 (#3)	43 / 194	Steady
1947	203,202	21.2 (#3)	44 / 194	▲1
1951	216,616	22.5 (#3)	48 / 196	▲4
1955	226,122	23.2 (#3)	47 / 196	▼1
1959	229,088	23.3 (#3)	47 / 196	Steady
1963	225,160	23.4 (#3)	48 / 200	▲1
1967	219,184	22.1 (#3)	45 / 200	▼3
1971	407,225	20.4 (#3)	44 / 200	▼1
1975	407,286	21.1 (#3)	46 / 200	▲2
1979	390,281	21.3 (#3)	44 / 200	▼2
1983	396,281	20.2 (#3)	42 / 200	▼2
1987	378,822	19.6 (#2)	42 / 200	Steady
1991	367,928	18.0 (#3)	35 / 200	▼7
1995	319,972	16.8 (#3)	34 / 200	▼1
1999	309,118	15.8 (#4)	35 / 200	▲1
2003	301,652	14.4 (#4)	28 / 200	▼7
2007	335,623	14.5 (#4)	31 / 200	▲3
2011	300,544	12.3 (#4)	28 / 200	▼3
2015	293,653	11.6 (#4)	27 / 200	▼1
2019	275,842	11.4 (#5)	25 / 200	▼2

== Party strength over time ==
Percentage of the total vote for Christian Democratic People's Party in Federal Elections 1971–2019
Canton	1971	1975	1979	1983	1987	1991	1995	1999	2003	2007	2011	2015	2019
Switzerland	20.3	21.1	21.3	20.2	19.6	18.0	16.8	15.9	14.4	14.5	12.3	11.6	11.4
Zürich	9.5	9.4	9.7	9.1	7.1	5.9	4.9	5.1	5.4	7.6	5.0	4.2	4.4
Bern	5.3	5.3	2.5	2.1	2.4	2.6	1.8	2.4	2.3	4.7	2.1	1.8	1.9
Luzern	48.8	50.1	50.4	49.6	47.0	48.6	37.3	33.8	29.5	30.2	27.1	23.9	25.5
Uri	*^{a}	18.6	*	*	*	*	*	*	*	*	*	26.8	39.2
Schwyz	38.5	46.4	49.4	46.6	36.9	32.8	27.4	27.3	23.4	20.1	20.6	19.5	18.4
Obwalden	67.0	97.1	95.7	91.0	51.7	95.3	94.2	*	66.4	32.5	*	*	36.7
Nidwalden	97.2	97.6	49.5	97.2	96.9	97.7	32.1	*	*	*	*	*	35.8
Glarus	*	*	*	*	*	*	*	*	*	*	*	*	*
Zug	*	39.4	34.1	39.9	34.2	34.2	27.1	26.4	22.9	23.3	24.3	26.4	23.8
Fribourg	41.5	46.9	39.9	37.9	37.7	36.8	36.0	33.7	25.4	24.8	20.3	22.7	17.8
Solothurn	27.7	26.0	27.6	26.7	25.1	22.2	21.5	21.4	21.0	20.4	17.9	14.8	14.2
Basel-Stadt	11.2	12.1	13.9	9.9	10.0	10.4	9.7	8.6	6.6	7.4	6.5	6.4	4.6
Basel-Landschaft	13.3	13.3	11.5	10.8	12.3	11.6	11.7	12.0	10.0	11.4	8.2	9.1	8.5
Schaffhausen	8.0	*	*	6.3	*	*	*	*	2.7	*	5.2	*	2.1
Appenzell A.Rh.	*	14.1	*	14.5	*	16.7	9.5	*	*	*	10.6	*	*
Appenzell I.Rh.	96.1	98.3	97.2	95.6	91.8	98.7	85.4	73.5	69.2	84.6	76.1	76.3	61.3
St. Gallen	44.0	43.3	44.1	40.8	39.4	35.8	31.0	26.2	22.2	21.4	20.3	16.6	18.8
Graubünden	37.3	35.9	35.5	33.3	28.5	25.6	26.9	25.6	23.7	20.3	16.6	16.8	16.3
Aargau	20.0	20.6	22.5	21.5	18.9	14.5	14.2	16.3	15.6	13.5	10.6	8.6	9.9
Thurgau	23.4	22.3	24.6	21.6	20.4	16.5	13.0	15.7	16.5	15.2	14.4	13.1	12.7
Ticino	34.8	35.7	34.1	34.0	38.2	26.9	28.4	25.9	24.6	24.1	20.0	20.1	18.2
Vaud	5.3	4.6	5.1	4.5	4.1	3.6	5.6	4.5	4.4	5.6	4.6	4.1	2.4
Valais	61.5	59.7	58.8	57.5	58.7	54.3	54.8	51.4	47.9	44.9	39.9	39.8	34.8
Neuchâtel	*	*	*	*	*	*	*	*	*	3.3	3.5	3.6	4.2
Genève	13.8	14.7	14.0	12.3	14.6	14.5	13.4	14.1	11.8	9.7	9.8	12.1	7.7
Jura	^{b}	^{b}	37.7	25.1	33.0	36.0	38.2	39.2	39.5	25.0	33.2	27.6	22.8

1.^aA "*" indicates that the party was not on the ballot in this canton.
2.^bPart of the Canton of Bern until 1979.

== Leadership ==
=== Presidents ===
Name	Dates	Canton
Adalbert Wirz	1912–1917	Obwalden
Eugène Deschenaux	1917–1920	Fribourg
Joseph Räber	1920–1928	Schwyz
Ernest Perrier	1928–1932	Fribourg
Eduard Guntli	1932–1933	St. Gallen
Raymond Evéquoz	1934–1935	Valais
Emil Nietlispach	1935–1940	Aargau
Pierre Aeby	1940–1946	Fribourg
Josef Escher	1946–1950	Valais
Max Rohr	1950–1955	Aargau
Jean Bourgknecht	1956–1959	Fribourg
Ettore Tenchio	1960–1968	Ticino
Franz Josef Kurmann	1968–1973	Lucerne
Hans Wyer	1973–1984	Valais
Flavio Cotti	1984–1986	Ticino
Eva Segmüller	1986–1992	St. Gallen
Carlo Schmid-Sutter	1992–1994	Appenzell Innerrhoden
Anton Cottier	1994–1997	Fribourg
Adalbert Durrer	1997–2001	Obwalden
Philipp Stähelin	2001–2004	Thurgau
Doris Leuthard	2004–2006	Aargau
Christophe Darbellay	2006–2016	Valais
Gerhard Pfister	2016–2020	Zug

=== Secretaries-General ===
Name	Dates
Iwan Rickenbacher	1988–1992
Raymond Loretan	1992–1997
Hilmar Gernet	1997–2001
Reto Nause	2001–2008
Tim Frey	2009–2012
Béatrice Wertli	2012–2018
Gianna Luzio	2018–2020
