= Augusta Gillabert-Randin =

Swiss farmer and rural women's movement pioneer (1869–1940)

- Born: Augusta Randin; 22 November 1869; Orbe, Switzerland
- Died: 1 April 1940 (aged 70); Lausanne, Switzerland
- Occupations: Farmer; association leader
- Known for: Founding the first women farmers' association in Switzerland
- Spouse: Jean Jules Gillabert
- Parent(s): Auguste Randin; Jenny Fontannaz

Augusta Gillabert-Randin, born Augusta Randin (22 November 1869 – 1 April 1940), was a Swiss farmer and a pioneer of the rural women's movement, who founded the first women farmers' association in Switzerland.

== Biography ==
Augusta Randin was born on 22 November 1869 at Orbe, the daughter of Auguste Randin, a merchant, and Jenny née Fontannaz. She attended secondary school and trained in home economics. In 1893 she married the farmer Jean Jules Gillabert. She worked at first in her father's business, and after her husband's death in 1914 ran their farm at Moudon alone.

In 1918 Gillabert-Randin founded the Association des productrices de Moudon, from 1921 the Association des paysannes de Moudon, the first of its kind in Switzerland, out of which the Association agricole des femmes vaudoises later grew; she presided over the latter in 1930. She took part in the second Swiss congress on women's interests in 1921 and in the SAFFA exhibition of 1928, and at the founding of the Swiss Association of Women Farmers in 1932 she was named its honorary president.

Gillabert-Randin developed training for women farmers, campaigned for the recognition of women's work in agriculture, and took part as a delegate in international agricultural congresses. She also argued the cause of abstinence and of women's suffrage among the rural population.

== Bibliography ==
- Le Mouvement féministe, 13 April 1940
- P. Moser, M. Gosteli, eds., Une paysanne entre ferme, marché et associations, 2005

=== Archives ===
- Collection biographique, Gosteli-Stiftung, Worblaufen
