= Magic formula (Swiss politics) =

Agreement to divide Federal Council seats

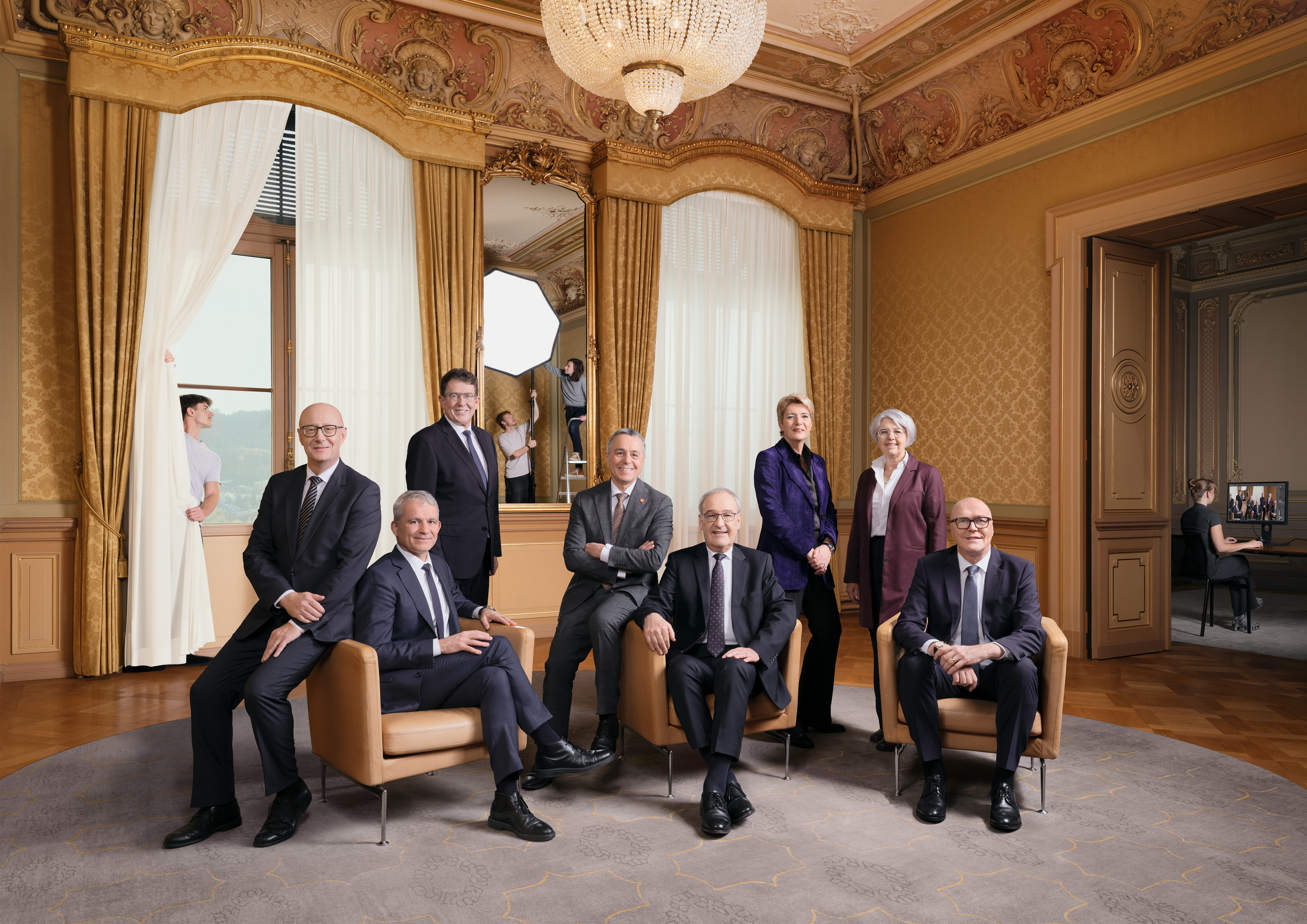
The 2026 Swiss Federal Council

In Swiss politics, the magic formula (German: Zauberformel, French: formule magique, Italian: formula magica, Romansh: furmla magica) is an arithmetic formula for dividing the seven executive seats on the Federal Council among the four coalition parties.

The formula is not a legal requirement and is not formally written: it is the result of an agreement among the four large coalition parties.

== History ==
The formula was first applied in 1959. It gave the Free Democratic Party (now FDP.The Liberals), the Catholic Conservative Party (later Christian Democratic People's Party, now The Centre) and the Social Democratic Party two seats each, while the Party of Farmers, Traders and Independents (now the Swiss People's Party; SVP/UDC) received one seat. After the 2003 general election, the formula was modified, giving two seats to the SVP at the expense of the Christian Democrats. This was because the Swiss People's Party received 29% of the votes in the election, making it Switzerland's largest party by vote share.

After the election of Eveline Widmer-Schlumpf to the Federal Council in Autumn 2007, she was excluded from the SVP party group because she had taken the seat of Christoph Blocher, the unofficial leader of the SVP. Samuel Schmid, the other member of the Council in the SVP, was excluded for the same reason. They then led the establishment of the new Conservative Democratic Party of Switzerland (BDP/PBD). Due to this change, the two seats previously allocated to the SVP now went to the BDP, although it had only a handful of seats in Parliament.

On 12 November 2008, Schmid resigned from his post as Defense Minister. He was replaced in a vote that took place on 10 December 2008 by Ueli Maurer from the SVP, giving the party back one of its two magic formula seats.

Soon after the 2015 Swiss federal election, Widmer-Schlumpf of the BDP announced that she would not run for re-election to the Federal Council after the SVP won a record 29.4% of the vote, while her own party received 4.1% of the vote. The SVP was widely expected to fill her seat in the election, and Guy Parmelin, of the SVP, was ultimately elected on December 9.

With the merger at the start of 2021 of the Christian Democratic People's Party (CVP) and the BDP, the resulting party, The Centre, gained the former CVP's seat on the Council.

== Current formula ==
This is the composition of the Federal Council after the 2023 Swiss Federal Council election.

- The Liberals (FDP/PLR/PLD): two seats
- Social Democratic Party (SPS/PSS): two seats
- Swiss People's Party (SVP/PPS): two seats
- The Centre (Mitte / Centre / Alleanza del Centro): one seat

== See also ==
- Concordance system
- Origins and history of the Federal Council
- D'Hondt method
