= Ernst Laur =

Swiss agronomist and farmers' leader (1871–1964)

- Born: 27 March 1871; Basel, Switzerland
- Died: 30 May 1964 (aged 93); Effingen, Switzerland
- Occupations: Agronomist; association leader; professor
- Known for: Director of the Swiss Farmers' Union (1898–1939)
- Spouse: Sophie Schaffner
- Parent(s): Arnold Laur; Zélie Meyer

Ernst Laur (27 March 1871 – 30 May 1964) was a Swiss agronomist and agricultural organiser who directed the Swiss Farmers' Union from 1898 to 1939 and held the chair of rural economics at ETH Zurich. The combination of the two roles gave him a dominant position in Swiss public life during the first half of the 20th century.

== Early life and education ==
Laur was born on 27 March 1871 in Basel, the son of Arnold Laur, a hospital administrator, and Zélie Meyer. In 1895 he married Sophie Schaffner, daughter of the innkeeper Johann Jakob Schaffner. He attended the progymnasium in Basel and the Strickhof agricultural school in Zurich, completed placements on farms, and qualified as an agricultural engineer at the Federal Polytechnic in Zurich in 1893. After briefly managing an estate, he taught at the agricultural school in Brugg and took a doctorate at the University of Leipzig in 1896.

== Swiss Farmers' Union ==
In 1898 Laur became the first head of the federally subsidized secretariat of the Swiss Farmers' Union, and in the same year he took charge of the union itself, founded in 1897, directing it until 1939. He was a Privatdozent from 1901 and full professor of rural economics at the Federal Polytechnic from 1908 to 1937.

As head of the agricultural umbrella organisation, Laur soon acquired the reputation of undisputed leader of the Swiss farmers. He established the union's policy and ideology, which he defended with competence and eloquence. During the debate on customs tariffs in 1902 he convinced the farmers' organisations of the need for a moderately protectionist policy and made the union a powerful actor in economic policy. Without holding a parliamentary mandate himself, he exercised considerable political influence, contributing directly to tariff policy as the Federal Council's delegate for trade agreements from 1904 to 1945. The First World War gave the farmers' unions still greater power, as they took on quasi-executive functions in food supply, and Laur played an important part in the war economy. His influence on federal agricultural policy, uncontested during the first two decades of the century, weakened during the Depression, as a new generation of agronomists in the federal administration—Ernst Feisst and Friedrich Traugott Wahlen—gradually imposed an agricultural policy oriented toward national food supply.

== Economic theory and international standing ==
Laur's influence rested above all on the financial analyses produced by the union's secretariat. These supplied him with statistical arguments in defence of the union's interests and served as the foundation of his theories of rural economics, which gained an international reputation. His textbooks were translated into many languages and reissued several times. His influence was particularly strong in the interwar period in the largely agricultural new states of central and eastern Europe, where he was regarded as a defender of family farms against large landowners. His international standing brought him the presidency of the European Confederation of Agriculture from 1948 to 1950.

In agricultural policy, Laur held that farms should modernize according to business-management criteria while the state protected the sector against foreign competition through customs measures, allowing farmers to maintain their standing in industrial society. Despite his rhetorical emphasis on "preserving the peasantry", he sought to promote technical and economic modernization and a controlled structural change. Public opinion nonetheless regarded him as the exponent of an ideological, nationalist, and conservative vision of the peasantry—expressed in the slogan Schweizerart ist Bauernart ("the Swiss are farmers by nature")—which played a large part in the context of the spiritual defence of the country.

== Works ==
- Landwirtschaftliche Betriebslehre für bäuerliche Verhältnisse, 1907 (French: Economie rurale de l'exploitation familiale, 5th ed. 1962)
- Agrarpolitik, 1919 (French: Politique agraire, 1919)
- Erinnerungen eines schweizerischen Bauernführers, 1942

== Bibliography ==
- W. Baumann, Bauernstand und Bürgerblock, 1993
- H. Brandt, Von Thaer bis Tschajanow, 1994
- W. Baumann, P. Moser, Bauern im Industriestaat, 1999
