= Mascha Oettli =

Marie Louise [Mascha] Oettli (11 June 1908 – 27 April 1997) was a Swiss socialist and trade unionist, engaged in feminist struggles.

== Biography ==
Mascha Oettli was born and raised in a cultivated and open intellectual milieu. Her father, Max Oettli, was educated at the Swiss Federal Institute of Technology in Zurich, where he graduated as a "master" in natural sciences in 1902, and then completed his doctorate at the University of Zurich. He was a teacher at the Landerziehungsheim Glarisegg near Steckborn, where Mascha was born and spent her childhood. Her mother, Natalie (Tata) Oettli-Kirpitschnikowa (1875-1966), the daughter of a well-known Russian teacher, had first been a teacher in Russia before coming to Switzerland to study medicine; she was a school doctor at the Glarisegg. Her parents were married in 1905 and had 6 children. In 1921, the family settled near Lausanne in Vers-chez-les-Blanc, and Mascha attended the Lausanne gymnasium. From high school, she became interested in politics and became a member of a school-aged youth movement where she became acquainted with the future Social Democrats Eugen Steinemann and Ruedi Schümperli.

She studied medicine and natural sciences. She then heard about the "Walkemühle" school in Melsungen run by the German pedagogue and socialist Minna Specht based on the philosopher Leonard Nelson's pedagogical conceptions. She took economics courses and acquired the "socialist tools" and remained there for three years.

During her stay in Germany, she was denounced for acts of resistance to Nazism. Her struggle against Nazism with her German comrades from 1933 to 1934 was followed on her return to Switzerland from her membership of the Socialist Party of Switzerland. She is then editor of the newspapers of the public services union and the federation of trade, transport and food. She is secretary of the Union of Swiss Peasants from 1942 to 1947 and central secretary of the Socialist Party and Swiss Socialist Women from 1952 to 1970. She is in charge of agricultural policy. It is committed to women's right to vote and equal pay.

Following a four-week trip to India, Mascha Oettli collected money from Socialist party women's groups for a school in Calcutta. For several years, she also managed the Al Forno holiday and education center in Ticino. The creation of this center was due to two former students of the Walkmühle school (founded in 1922) and Mascha Oettli had chosen to be a student for his training: the couple René and Hanna Bertholet from Geneva had organized to give courses of political and educational formation. She subsequently acquired a solid legal basis which enabled the foundation on 29 May 1944 of the "Al Forno holiday center", of which Mascha Oettli was from the beginning the president and the person in charge. During and after the Second World War, the center also housed German political refugees.

In 1983, Macha Oettli moved from the city of Zurich to Bolligen. She died on 27 April 1997 in the Stapfenmatt retirement home in Niederbuchsiten.
