= Swiss Farmers' Union =

- Abbreviation: SFU
- Formation: 1897
- Founded at: Bern
- Type: Association (Switzerland)
- Board of directors: Martin Rufer
- Website: https://www.sbv-usp.ch

The Swiss Farmers' Union (SFU; until 2013 Schweizerischer Bauernverband; French: Union Suisse des Paysans (USP), Italian: Unione Svizzera dei Contadini (USC), Romansh: Uniun Purila Svizra (UPS) represents the interests of the farming community in Switzerland as an umbrella organization and is considered one of the most influential organizations in the country.

== History ==
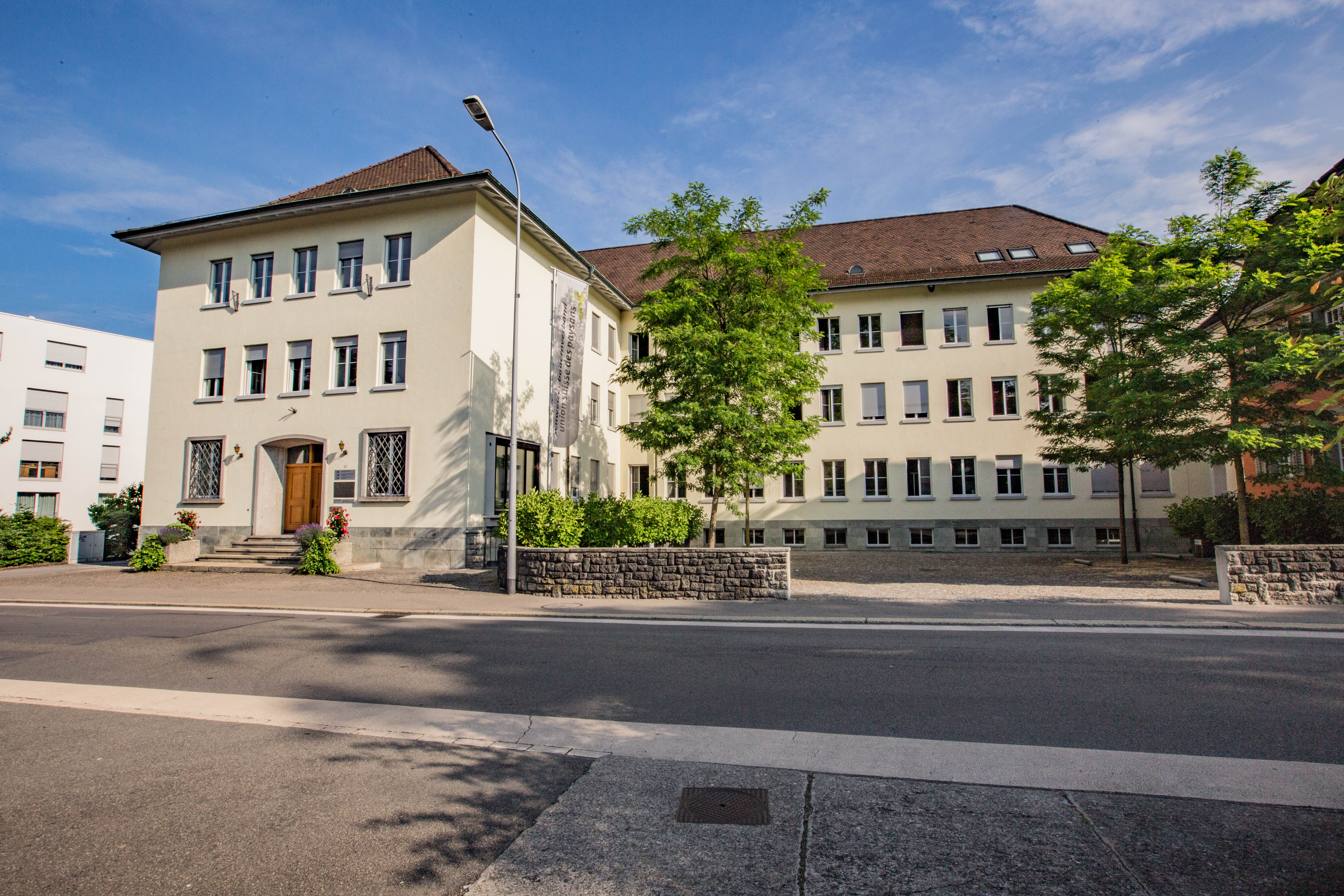
The headquarters of the Swiss Farmers' Union at Laurstrasse 10 in Brugg

The association was established in 1897 in Bern Town Hall. Its co-founders were Johann Jenny and Caspar Decurtins. Three years later, the association's headquarters were relocated from Bern to Brugg, as the wife of the association's director, Ernst Laur, was from there and was unwilling to relocate to Bern. Another influential figure in the early years was Fritz Zaugg. Over time, the modest Farmers' Secretariat (Schweizerisches Bauernsekretariat; SBS for short) evolved into a sizable association with over 80 permanent employees through the establishment of new departments. In 1941, the Swiss Rural Women's Association joined the SFU. In 1937, the SFU was pivotal in establishing the Agricultural Information Service (AIS). In 1947, a placement office for agricultural workers and trainees was established. Workers were initially recruited mainly from Italy, and later from Spain, Portugal, and Yugoslavia. In the mid-1970s, the Swiss Confederation transferred the central evaluation of accounting results to the Swiss Confederation's Center of Excellence for Agricultural Research in Tänikon. As a result, the SFU was reorganized in 1979 and the SBS was dissolved. The focus shifted to influencing the legislative process in favor of agriculture and providing services to members. In 1981, the Small Farmers' Association was accepted as a section, before leaving in 1982 due to differences over the Small Farmers' Initiative.

In 1995, the association began offering Internet services under the name agri.ch. After a Management buyout, the company became green.ch in 2001.

== Organization and objectives ==
The association is composed of representatives of 25 cantonal farmers' associations and 60 agricultural umbrella and specialized organizations (21 from the animal production sector, 13 from the crop production sector, 4 cooperative associations, and 22 from other sectors; as of November 2023).

The affiliated sub-associations represent some 49,000 farms. They elect 500 members to the Assembly of Delegates, which defines the goals of the association and makes fundamental decisions. The delegates elect a 100-member Chamber of Agriculture (LAKA), which is responsible for securing income, making submissions to the authorities, and supervising management. The Board of Directors consists of 18 to 21 members. It deals with the day-to-day business of the Association, forms specialist commissions, and appoints the members of the Secretariat.

SFU Director Martin Rufer and his deputy Urs Schneider can lobby directly in the Federal Palace. They were granted access to the parliament building by SFU President and National Councillor Markus Ritter. Ritter is the first organic farmer to hold this position. Among the more than 40 "farmer parliamentarians" of the Swiss Farmers' Association are Charles Juillard, a member of the Council of States, Leo Müller, a member of the National Council, and Nicolò Paganini, a member of the National Council and chairman of the Board of Directors of the Migros Cooperative Eastern Switzerland.

The SFU has set itself the following goals To provide a range of services to farmers, to preserve the family farm, to provide farmers with an adequate income, to influence the legal framework, to use the land wisely, to produce quality products through transparent production processes and designations of origin, to protect cultivated land and to preserve nature.

To achieve these goals, the SFU operates various service companies, including Agrimpuls (Job placement), Agriprof (Education), Agriexpert (Fiduciary services, Legal and Valuation issues), the Agricultural Construction and Architecture Firm LBA, and the Agrisano Companies. The latter are five legally and economically independent companies (Agrisano Foundation, Agrisano Health Insurance Ltd., Agrisano Insurance Ltd., Agrisano Previous, and Agrisano Pencas) that work together to offer farming families and their employees self-developed personal insurance solutions tailored to their needs. Agrisano works closely with the cantonal Agricultural Professional Organizations, which operate regional offices for Agrisano.

== Financing ==
The Farmers' Union is financed two-thirds by income from its services and one-third by contributions from its member sections. These contributions are paid directly or indirectly by the farming families and amount to approximately CHF 100.-- to CHF 150.-- per family per year, depending on the size of the farm. The farm families' contributions are divided 3:2 into area contributions and production contributions. The reason for this division is that it takes into account both the area cultivated and the added value of the various branches of production. The Assembly of Delegates votes annually on the area contributions and also decides every four years on the product contributions, which are adjusted to the current share of final production.

The most recent decision of the Assembly of Delegates adjusted the amount of product-related contributions at the beginning of 2018. The product-related contributions were recalculated based on final production and resulted in some significant changes for individual member sections. At the same time, the SFU adjusted the representation rights in the committees.

The Swiss Vegetable Producers Association (VSGP) did not accept the decision of the Delegates Assembly and decided at the end of February 2018 to withdraw from the SFU with retroactive effect from January 1, 2018.

== Positions ==
=== Agricultural policy 22+ ===
The Farmers' Union welcomes the suspension of the 22+ agricultural policy, which the SFU believes offers no prospects for farming families and is immature.

=== Animal welfare ===
According to the association, animal welfare is very important to them. It therefore advocates clear enforcement of the Animal Welfare Act - the association also opposes the slaughter of pregnant cows and cattle. According to Martin Rufer of the SFU, sanctions against slaughterhouses are more effective than fines. However, the association is in favor of factory farming and opposed the federal popular initiative "For a natural farmer - against animal factories (small farmers' initiative)". It also opposes the federal popular initiative "No to factory farming in Switzerland", which will be put to the vote on September 25, 2022. In addition, the SFU is committed to ensuring that direct payments to farmers (approximately CHF 2.8 billion per year) are not reduced, as the majority of these payments are tied to public services. However, the SFU is a member of the Proviande trade association.

== Statements ==
=== CO_{2} Act ===
After a controversial debate, the Chamber of Agriculture voted in favor of the CO_{2} law by 56 votes to 19, with 9 abstentions.

=== Pesticide initiatives ===
According to the Farmers' Union, sustainable agriculture is very important to them. On June 13, 2021, an initiative related to the use of pesticides in water and food was voted on, but not approved. According to SFU deputy director Urs Schneider, this is the biggest campaign in the 125-year history of the Swiss Farmers' Union. Schneider is coordinating the 2x NO campaign.

=== Referendum against free trade agreement with Indonesia ===
The Farmers' Union supported the Free Trade Agreement with Indonesia in the referendum on March 7, 2021.

=== Corporate Responsibility Initiative ===
The Chamber of Agriculture has decided to vote against the Corporate Responsibility Initiative.

== Board members ==
The 24-member SFU board is heavily dominated by the Swiss People's Party (SVP) and includes the following members in addition to SFU President Markus Ritter (The Center):

Name	Position(s)
Anne Challandes	Vice President of the SFU, President of the Swiss Farmers' and Rural Women's Union (SBLV)
Fritz Glauser	Vice-president of the SFU, President of the Swiss Grain Producers Association (SGPV), President of the Fribourg Farmers' Union (UPF)
Alois Huber-Troxler	National Councillor, Vice President of the SFU, former President of the Aargau Farmers' Association (BVA)
Hugo Abt	Representative of Swiss cattle producers
Claude Baehler	President Prométerre
Jürg Bärtschi	Representative of the poultry sector
Boris Beuret	Representative of Swiss Milk Producers (SMP)
Andreas Bernhard	Livestock industry representative, President of Suisseporcs
Vincent Boillat	Representative of cantons Jura, Neuchâtel, Geneva
Pierre-André Geiser	VR Chairman Fenaco
Sem Genini	Managing Director Unione Contadini Ticinesi (UCT)
Willy Giroud	President of the Valais Chamber of Agriculture (WLK)
Maja Grunder	President of the Thurgau Agricultural Association (VTL)
Ursin Gustin	Representative of young farmers (JULA)
Martin Haab	National Councillor, President of the Zürich Farmers' Union (ZBV)
Jürg Iseli	President of the Bernese Farmers' Union (BEBV)
Damien Humbert-Droz	Plant cultivation representative
Markus Kretz	President of the Lucerne Farmers' Association (LBV)
Jakob Lütolf	President of the Central Switzerland Farmers' Union (ZBB) (Zug, Schwyz, Uri, Unterwalden (NW & OW), Lucerne)
Thomas Roffler	President of the Bündner Farmers' Union (BBV), Swiss Alpine Farmers' Union (SAV)
Peter Seiler	Representing the mountain and alpine economy, the Board of the Swiss Association for Mountain Regions and the Swiss Alpine Association
Andreas Vögtli	Representative Solothurn/Basel Landschaft & Stadt, President of the Solothurn Farmers' Union (SOBV)
Fritz Waldvogel	Representative Appenzell (Outer & Inner Rhoden), Glarus, Schaffhausen, President of the Glarus Farmers' Union (BVGL)
Jeanette Zürcher-Egloff	Vice President of the Swiss Farmers' and Rural Women's Association (SBLV)

== Presidents since 1897 ==
Name	Term of office
Johann Jenny	1897–1930
Franz Moser	1930–1935
Ferdinand Porchet	1935–1949
Rudolf Reichling	1949–1961
Joachim Weber	1961–1974
Peter Gerber	1974–1988
Jean Savary	1988–1992
Marcel Sandoz	1992–2000
Hansjörg Walter	2000–2012
Markus Ritter	2012–

== Directors since 1897 ==
Name	Term of office
Ernst Laur	1897–1939
Oskar Howald	1939–1949
Ernst Jaggi	1949–1958
René Juri	1958–1987
Melchior Ehrler	1987–2002
Jacques Bourgeois	2002–2020
Martin Rufer	2020-today
