= Christophe Darbellay =

Swiss politician (born 1971)

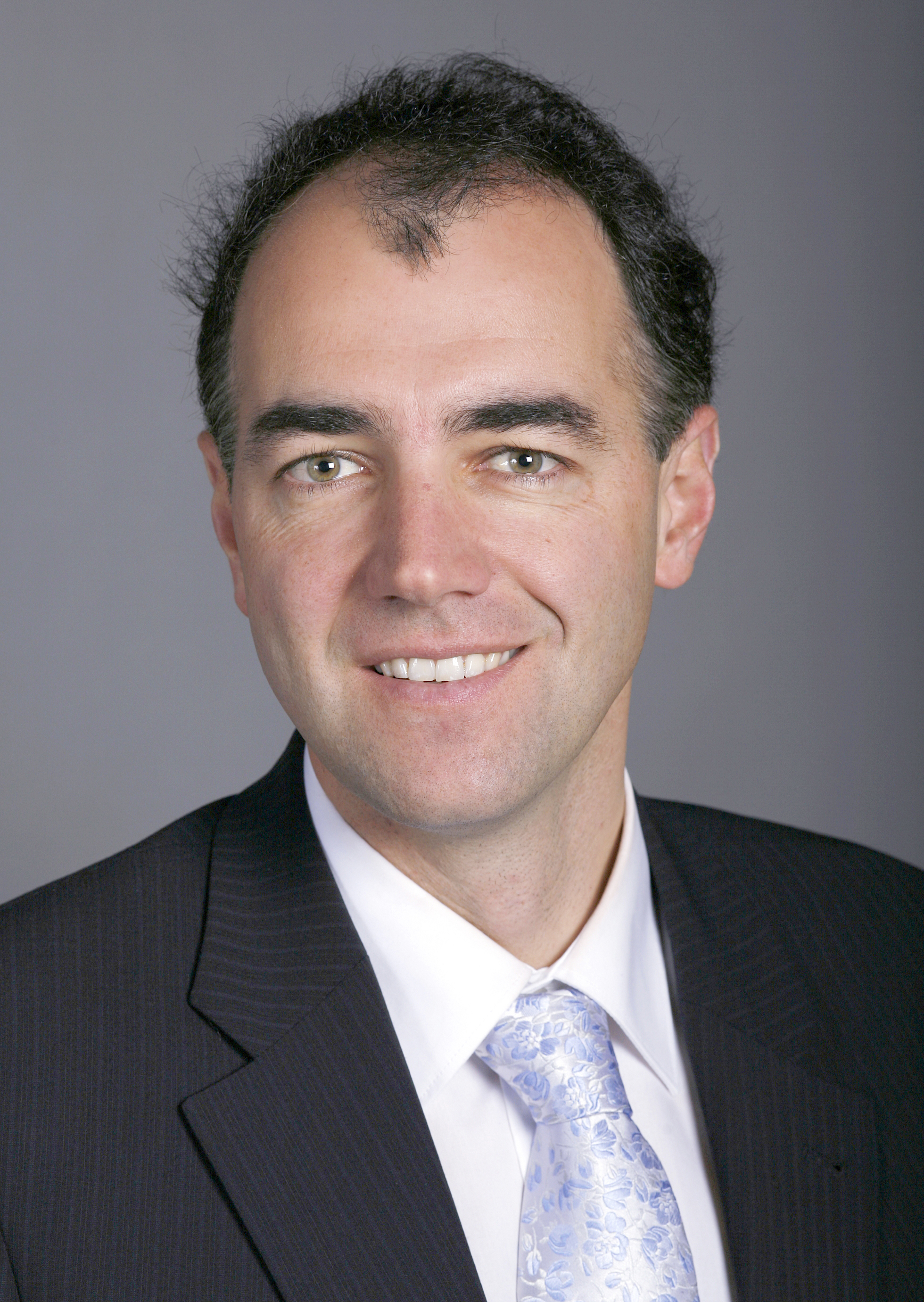

Christophe Darbellay (born 7 March 1971 in Martigny) is a Swiss politician who is member of The Centre.

Since 2017 he has been State Councillor in charge of the Department of Economy and Education in the Valais government.
