= Viola Amherd =

Swiss Federal Councillor from 2019 to 2025

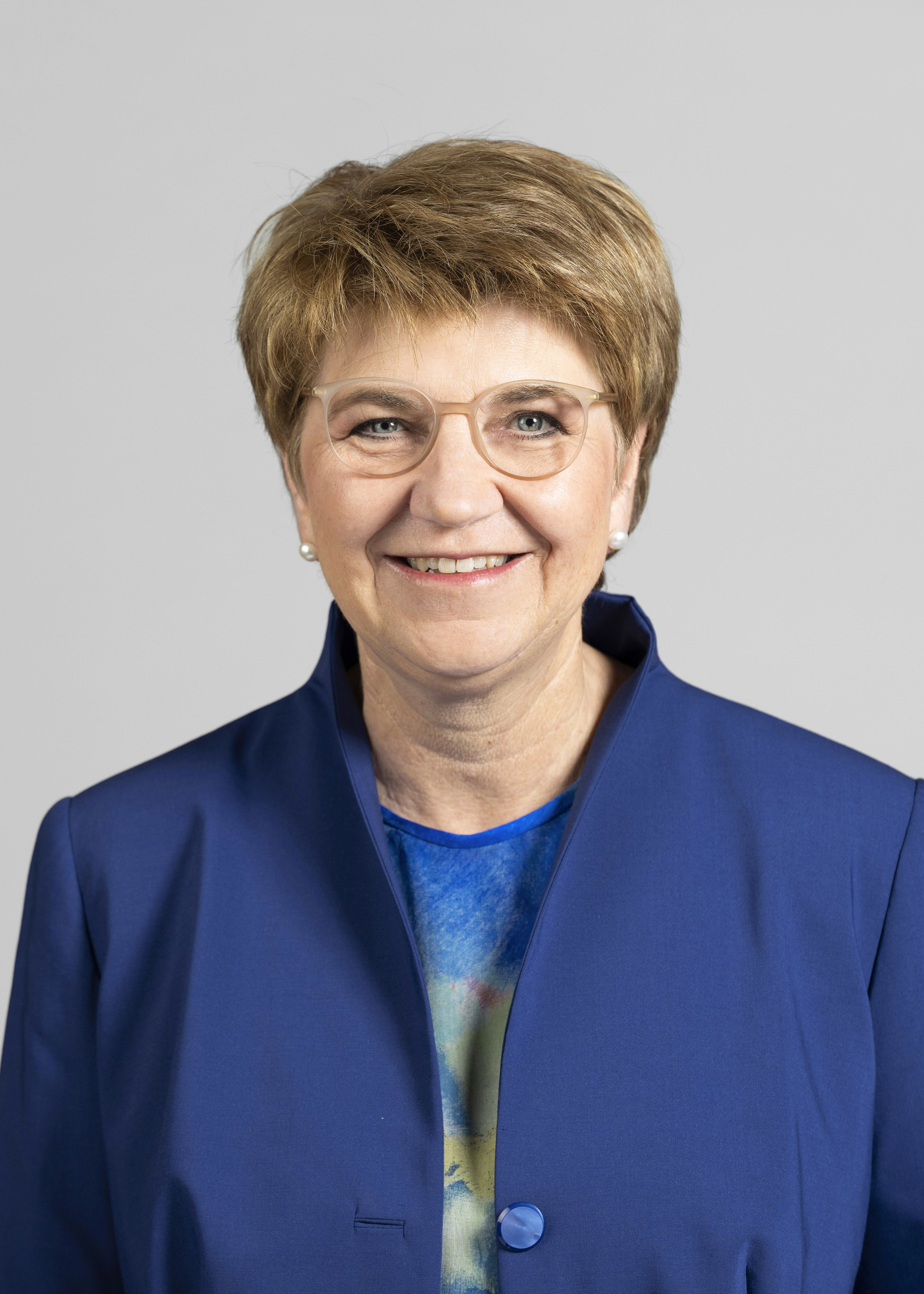
- Official portrait, 2024

President of Switzerland
- In office 1 January 2024 – 31 December 2024
- Vice President: Karin Keller-Sutter
- Preceded by: Alain Berset
- Succeeded by: Karin Keller-Sutter

Vice President of the Swiss Confederation
- In office 1 January 2023 – 31 December 2023
- President: Alain Berset
- Preceded by: Alain Berset
- Succeeded by: Karin Keller-Sutter

Swiss Federal Councillor
- In office 1 January 2019 – 31 March 2025
- Department: Defence, Civil Protection and Sport
- Preceded by: Doris Leuthard
- Succeeded by: Martin Pfister

Personal details
- Born: Viola Patricia Amherd; 7 June 1962 (age 64) Brig-Glis, Valais, Switzerland
- Party: The Centre (since 2021)
- Other political affiliations: Christian Democratic People's (until 2021)
- Education: University of Fribourg
- Occupation: Politician; notary; lawyer

Viola Patricia Amherd (born 7 June 1962) is a Swiss politician who served as a member of the Swiss Federal Council from 2019 to 2025, and as President of the Swiss Confederation for 2024 between 1 January and 31 December. She was the head of the Federal Department of Defence, Civil Protection and Sport. Amherd was a member of the Christian Democratic People's Party (CVP/PDC) before it merged with the Conservative Democratic Party (BDP/PBD) to form The Centre (DM/LC) in 2021, which she joined.

== Biography ==
=== Political career ===
Amherd was a member of the city council of Brig-Glis (Stadtrat, executive member) from 1992 to 1996, vice president of the municipality of Brig-Glis from 1996 to 2000 and president of the municipality of Brig-Glis from 2000 to 2012. Representing the canton of Valais, she was member of the Swiss National Council from 31 May 2005 to 31 December 2018. In the election for the Federal Council of 9 December 2015, Amherd received 16 votes for the vacant seat held by Eveline Widmer-Schlumpf until the following 31 December, although she had not put her name forward as a candidate. The seat eventually went to Guy Parmelin.

In the course of speculations about a candidature for the Federal Council, Amherd announced her candidacy for the replacement of Doris Leuthard on 5 October 2018. On 16 November 2018, Amherd and Heidi Z'graggen, a local executive in the canton of Uri, were nominated as Federal Council candidates by the CVP/PDC. The following 5 December, she was elected to the Federal Council with 148 voting in the first ballot alongside Karin Keller-Sutter of FDP.The Liberals.

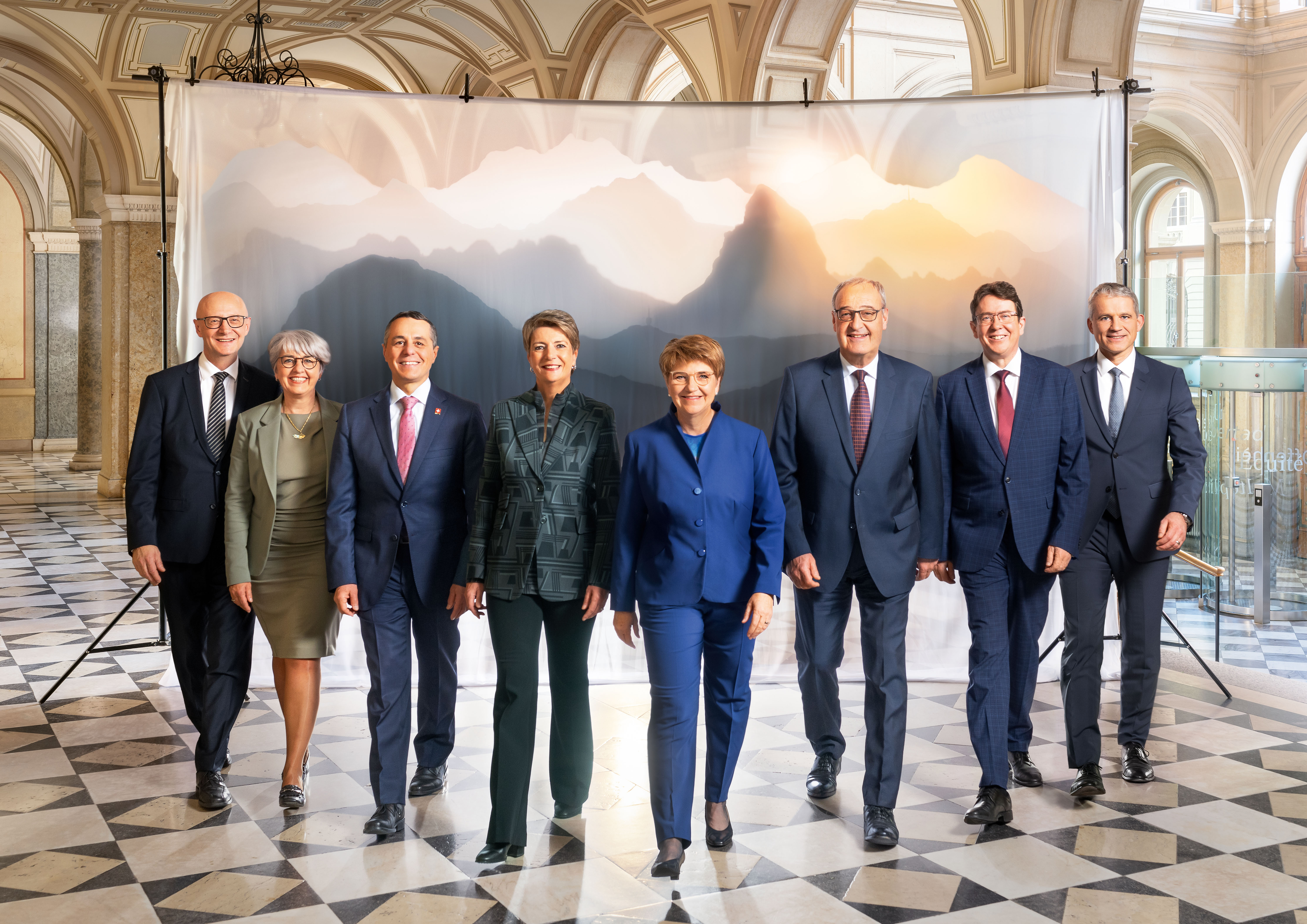
Official portrait of the Federal Council in the year of Amherd's presidency

On 10 December 2018, it was announced that Amherd would head the Federal Department of Defence, Civil Protection and Sport (DDPS) from 1 January 2019. Amherd became the first woman to hold the position.

Following the 2022 Russian invasion of Ukraine, in April 2022 Amherd wrote to International Olympic Committee President Thomas Bach, urging the IOC to suspend officials from Russia and Belarus, much as the IOC recommended a ban of athletes and officials from both countries from competitions. Amherd advocated for strengthening the Swiss Armed Forces, and opposed the possibility of Swiss membership in NATO.

On 7 December 2022, Amherd was elected vice-president of the Federal Council for 2023 alongside Alain Berset, who was elected president. On 13 December 2023, the federal Assembly elected Amherd President of the Swiss Confederation for 2024 with 158 out of 243 votes. She began serving in that function on 1 January 2024. As president, Amherd has delivered a traditional New Year's address. Her term as president ended on 31 December 2024 as Karin Keller-Sutter took over the following day. On 15 January 2025, Amherd announced that she would resign as a federal councillor in March 2025.

=== Personal life ===
Amherd graduated from the Latin Grammar School at the College in Brig in 1982. From 1982 to 1987, she studied jurisprudence at the University of Fribourg and in 1987 received a licenciate in both laws. She then completed an internship as a lawyer and notary in Brig-Glis until 1990. In 1990 she was awarded the notary's diploma of the canton of Valais and in 1991 the lawyer's diploma and the bar exam of the canton of Valais. Since 1991, she has worked as a self-employed lawyer and notary with an office in Brig-Glis and from 1994 to 2006 as a part-time judge of the Federal Personnel Appeals Commission. Amherd is single and lives in Brig-Glis.

Political offices
Preceded by Doris Leuthard	Member of the Swiss Federal Council; 2019–2025	Succeeded by Martin Pfister
Preceded by Guy Parmelin	Head of the Department of Defence, Civil Protection and Sport; 2019–2025	Succeeded by Martin Pfister
Preceded by Alain Berset	Vice President of Switzerland; 2023	Succeeded by Karin Keller-Sutter
Preceded by Alain Berset	President of Switzerland; 2024	Succeeded by Karin Keller-Sutter
