= The Centre (political party) =

The Centre: Die Mitte (German); Le Centre (French); il Centro (Italian); il Center (Romansh)
- President: Philipp Matthias Bregy
- Members in Federal Council: Martin Pfister
- Founded: 1 January 2021
- Merger of: Christian Democratic People's Party; Conservative Democratic Party
- Headquarters: Seilerstrasse 8a Postfach; CH-3011 Bern
- Youth wing: Young Centre / Centre Youth; German: Die Junge Mitte; French: Jeunes du Centre; Italian: Giovani del Centro; Romansh: Il Giuven Center
- Ideology: Christian democracy Conservatism
- Political position: Centre to centre-right
- European affiliation: European People's Party (associate)
- Colours: Orange
- Slogan: Freedom. Solidarity. Responsibility.
- Federal Council: 1 / 7
- National Council: 29 / 200
- Council of States: 15 / 46
- Cantonal executives: 40 / 154
- Cantonal legislatures: 425 / 2,544

Website
- die-mitte.ch (German) le-centre.ch (French)

The Centre (German: Die Mitte; French: Le Centre; Italian: il Centro; Romansh: il Center) is a centrist to centre-right political party in Switzerland. It was formed through the merger of the Christian Democratic People's Party of Switzerland (CVP/PDC) and the Conservative Democratic Party of Switzerland (BDP/PBD). Following the formal merger of the parties on 1 January 2021, it has 29 of 200 seats in the National Council and 15 of 46 seats in the Council of States. Martin Pfister is the party's representative on the Federal Council.

== History ==
The Christian Democratic People's Party of Switzerland (CVP) was founded in 1912 as the Catholic Conservative Party of Switzerland, becoming the Conservative-Christian-Social People's Party in 1957. In 1970, the name changed to the Christian Democratic People's Party of Switzerland. Over time, the party's dependence on Catholic and rural voters resulted in a deterioration of its vote share nationally, but most especially in urban areas. In the four largest cantons of Zürich, Bern, Vaud and Aargau, the CVP held only three of 94 seats in the National Council. It later ceded one of its two seats on the Federal Council to the SVP in accordance with the Magic formula used to derive party strength on the nation's executive. From the 1995 election to the 2019 election, the CVP's vote share decreased from 16.8% to 11.4%. After the 2003 election, Ruth Metzler of the CVP, was replaced by Christoph Blocher of the Swiss People's Party on the Federal Council, leaving the CVP with only one seat in the country's executive.

The Conservative Democratic Party of Switzerland (BDP) was founded on 1 November 2008 after moderate members of the Swiss People's Party (SVP), who supported the election of Eveline Widmer-Schlumpf over SVP leader Christoph Blocher to the Federal Council, were expelled by the national SVP and formed the new party. It remained a regional party with strength in Bern, Glarus and Grisons, but little support elsewhere in the country.

The parties had discussed a political alliance similar to that of the CDU/CSU in Germany from 2012 to 2014, but those negotiations failed. BDP President Martin Landolt openly discussed a merger after the 2019 elections when both parties saw their share of the vote drop from 2015. The parties agreed to a merger in September 2020 and both ratified the merger during 2020. The primary opposition to the change was among members who did not want to drop the "Christian" affiliation for the party. Cantonal parties were not required to adopt the new name if they do not wish to do so. However, the parties will be asked to make a decision on the name within five years of the national change. The party in the Canton of Valais rejected the change, voting to remain as the CVP. The CVP of Aargau, however, moved forward before the national party and contested the November 2020 elections to the Grand Council of Aargau as "CVP – Die Mitte".

== Ideology and platform ==
The Centre aims to promote Switzerland’s unity, seek compromise, and focus on solving problems rather than exploiting them for political gain. It positions itself between the left and right, which it sees as drifting ever further apart, and opposes the growing polarization of the country’s politics.

According to its statutes, the party is guided by Christian and conservative democratic values, seeking to foster the development of society and the state on the basis of individual freedom, support for families in all their forms, equal opportunities, and solidarity. It advocates for a competitive yet socially responsible economy, the responsible use of natural resources, and the lawful, accountable exercise of governmental authority. The Centre supports federalism and subsidiarity, the strengthening of Swiss national unity, and cooperation with other countries to safeguard independence, security, and the promotion of peace in Europe and beyond.

== Elections ==
In the 2019 Swiss federal election, the CVP tallied 11.6% of the vote for the National Council with 25 members, while the BDP won 2.4% and had three members. For elections to the Council of States, the CVP had 13 members. Combined, The Centre has 28 members in the National Council, placing it in a tie for fourth-largest in the lower house. It retains its status as the largest party in the upper house.

== Election results ==
=== National Council ===
Election	Votes	%	Seats	+/–
2023	359,075	14.06 (#4)	29 / 200	New
