= 2018 Swiss Federal Council election =

2018 Swiss Federal Council by-elections
← 2015 (regular) ← 2017 (by-)	5 December 2018	2019 →

2 of the 7 Federal Councillors
- Leuthard's seat
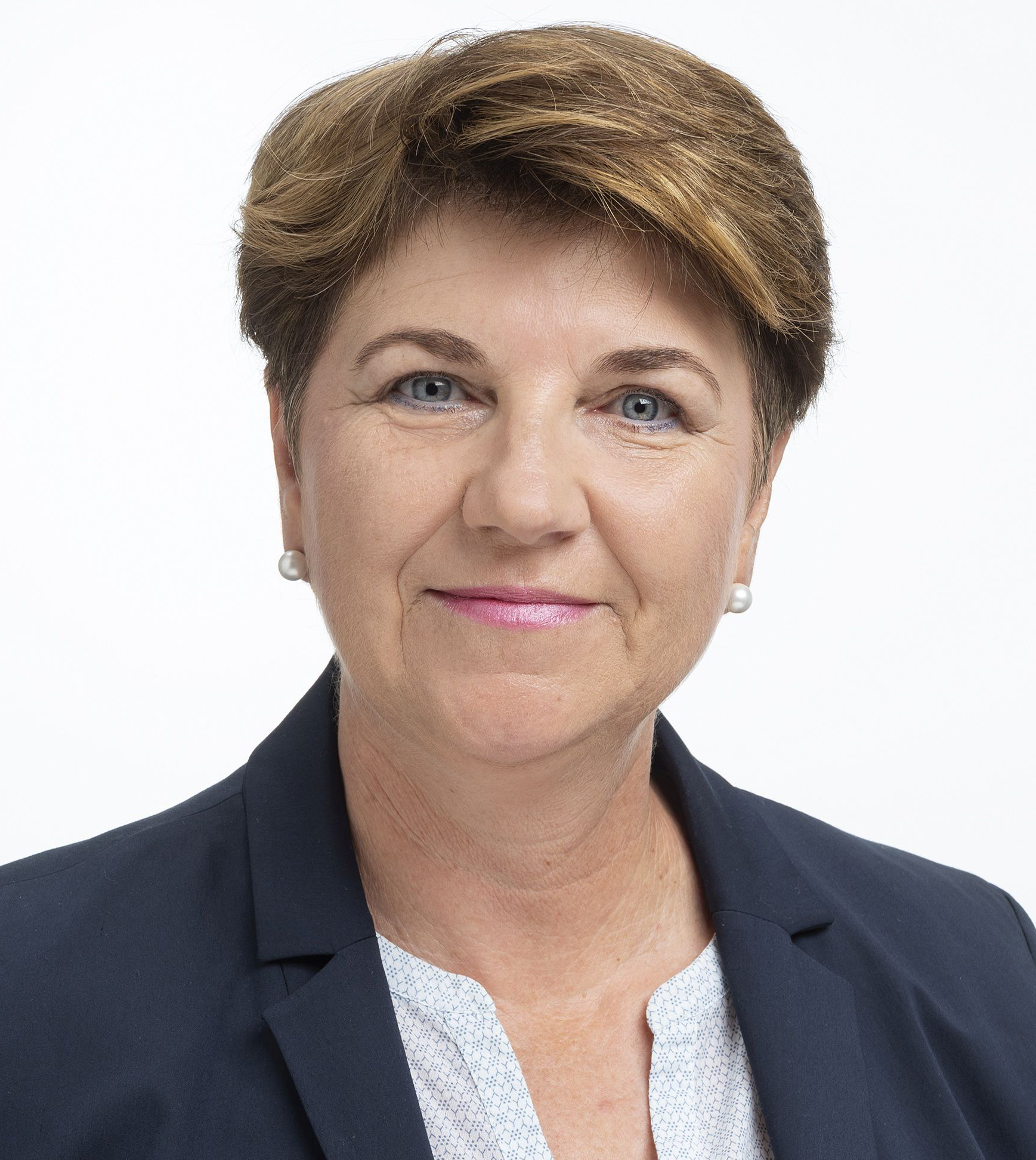

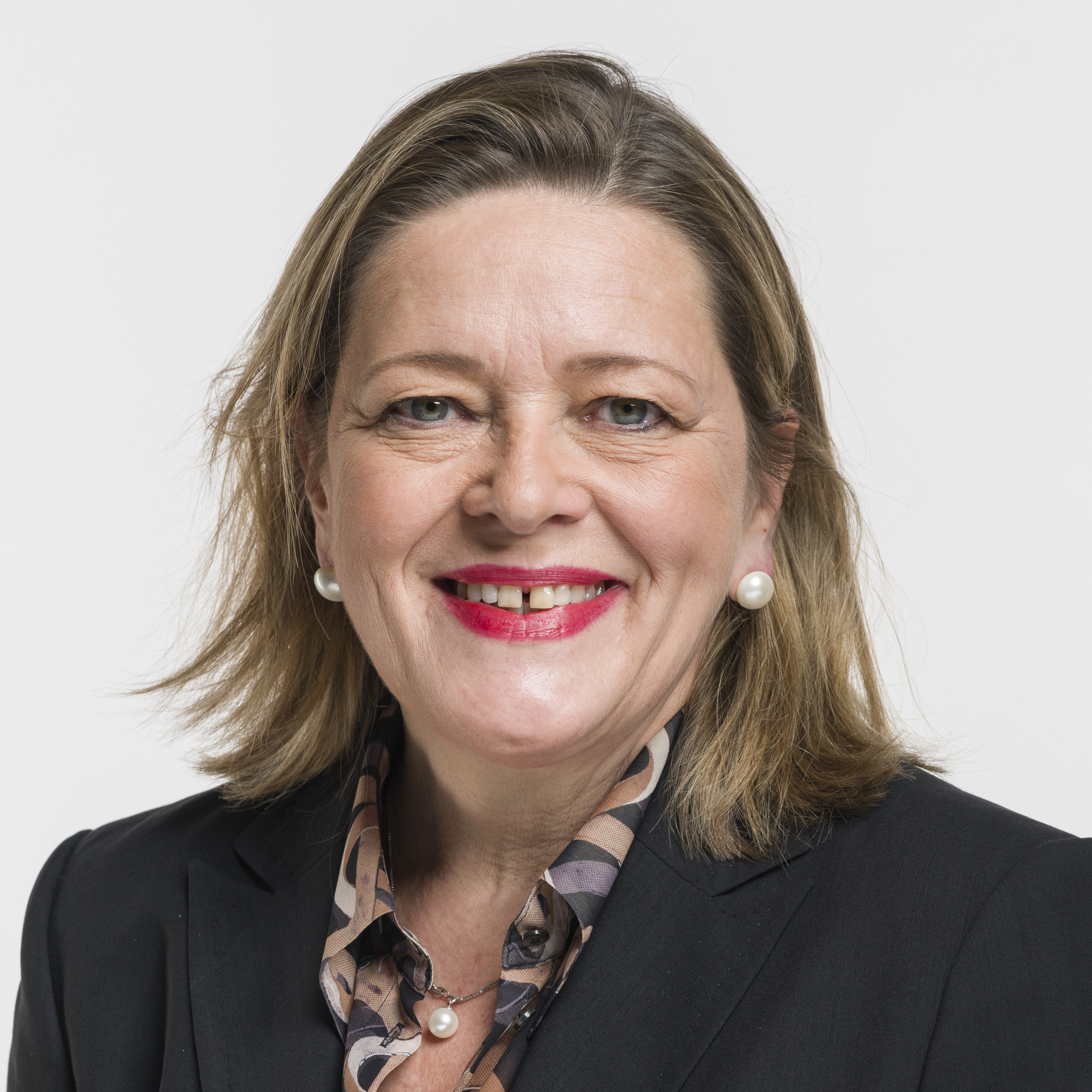

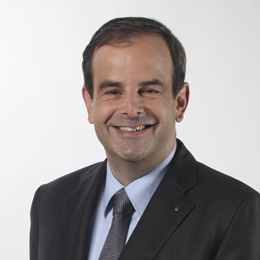
Candidate	Viola Amherd	Heidi Z'graggen	Gerhard Pfister
Party	Christian Democrats	Christian Democrats	Christian Democrats
Electoral vote	148	60	17
- Schneider-Ammann's seat
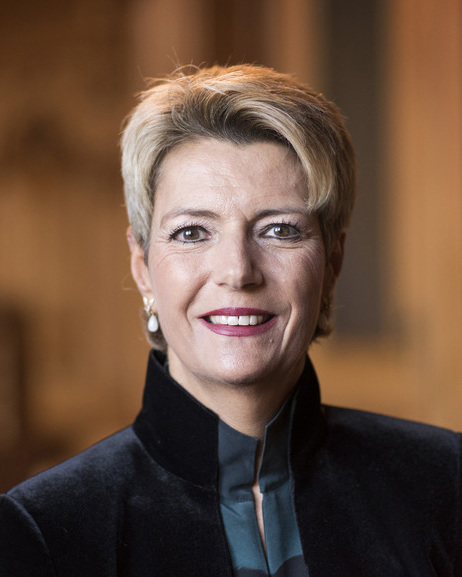

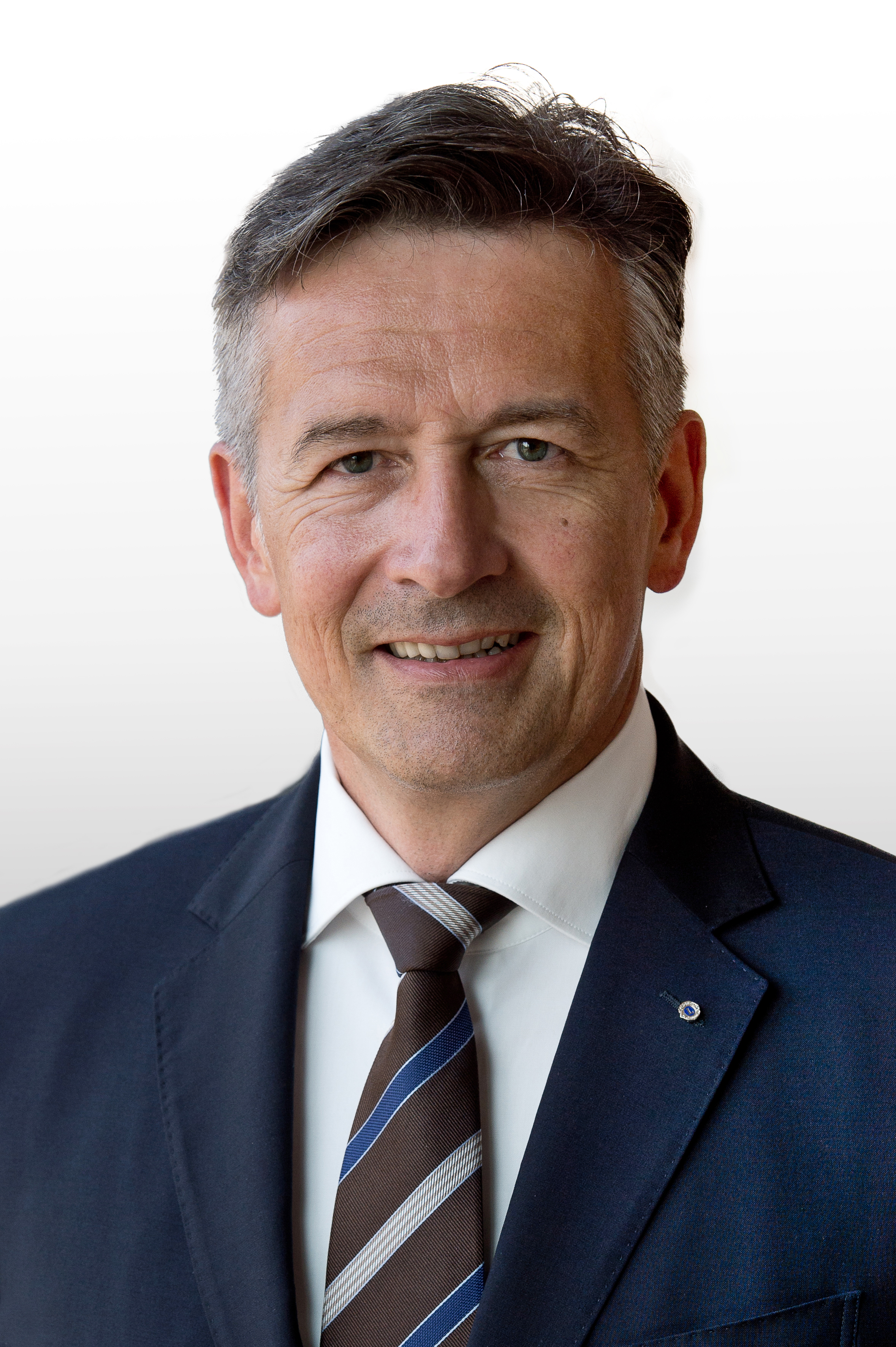
Candidate	Karin Keller-Sutter	Hans Wicki
Party	FDP.The Liberals	FDP.The Liberals
Electoral vote	154	56

By-elections to the Swiss Federal Council were held on 5 December 2018, after federal councillors Johann Schneider-Ammann (FDP-BE) and Doris Leuthard (CVP-AG) announced in September they would leave the Council effective 31 December of the same year.

The by-elections resulted in the elections of Karin Keller-Sutter (FDP-SG) and Viola Amherd (CVP-VS), yielding no change in the partisan composition of the council. Women re-gained a third seat in the Council, with the first simultaneous election of two women. The languages also retained the same representation (4 german-speakers, 2 french-speakers, and 1 italian-speaker) and catholics represented the majority of the federal council for the first time.

== Background ==
In Switzerland, the 7-seat executive Federal Council is apportioned between the parties following the unwritten agreement known as the Magic formula. The formula was followed from 1959 to 2008, and re-appeared in 2015; since 2003 the composition is: SVP 2 seats, SP 2 seats, FDP 2 seats, and CVP 1 seat.

Federal councillors are traditionally re-elected until they step down, only four ever lost re-election. Councillors more often stand down during their term as it allows their party to get more visibility at a moment other than shortly after a general election.

On 25 September 2018, the FDP councillor Johann Schneider-Ammann (elected to the council in 2010) announced he would resign effective 31 December; two days later the CVP councillor Doris Leuthard announced her departure as well after having evoked it during the campaign of the previous year's by-election. Following the Magic formula, only FDP candidates stood for Schneider-Ammann's seat and only CVP candidates stood for Leuthard's seat.

The negative campaigning around Isabelle Moret in the previous year's Federal Council by-election let to criticisms of women's reduced position in politics, especially as one of the only two women still on the Federal Council (Doris Leuthard) was expected to retire the next year. In this election the CVP fielded two women as its official candidates to replace her.

=== Electoral system ===
The seat is elected using an absolute majority with an exhaustive ballot, each seat being filled independently. In the first two rounds members of the Federal Assembly can vote for anyone eligible, but only those receiving at least ten votes are announced in the results; from the third round onwards only candidates who received at least ten votes in one of the first two rounds are eligible, the last-placed candidate is eliminated until someone reaches an overall majority.

== Candidates ==
=== Leuthard's seat ===
The center-right CVP fielded two candidates, both from allemanic Switzerland:

- Viola Amherd (CVP-VS), National Councillor for Valais (2005–)
- Heidi Z'graggen (CVP-UR), Uri Executive Councillor (2004–)

A third person received over ten votes despite not being candidate:

- Gerhard Pfister (CVP-ZG), National Councillor for Zug (2003–) and President of the CVP (2016–)
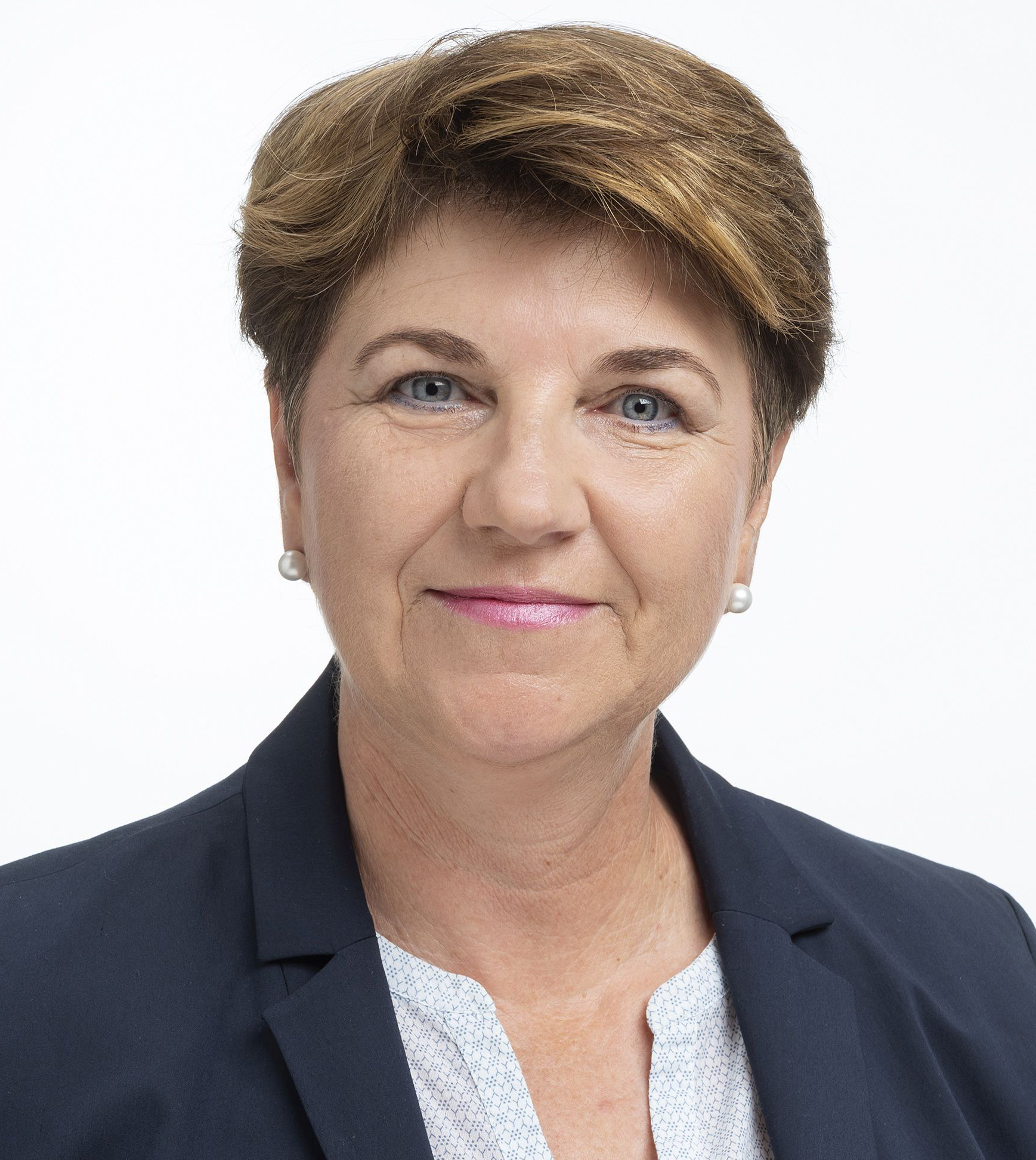
National Councillor
Viola Amherd
from Valais

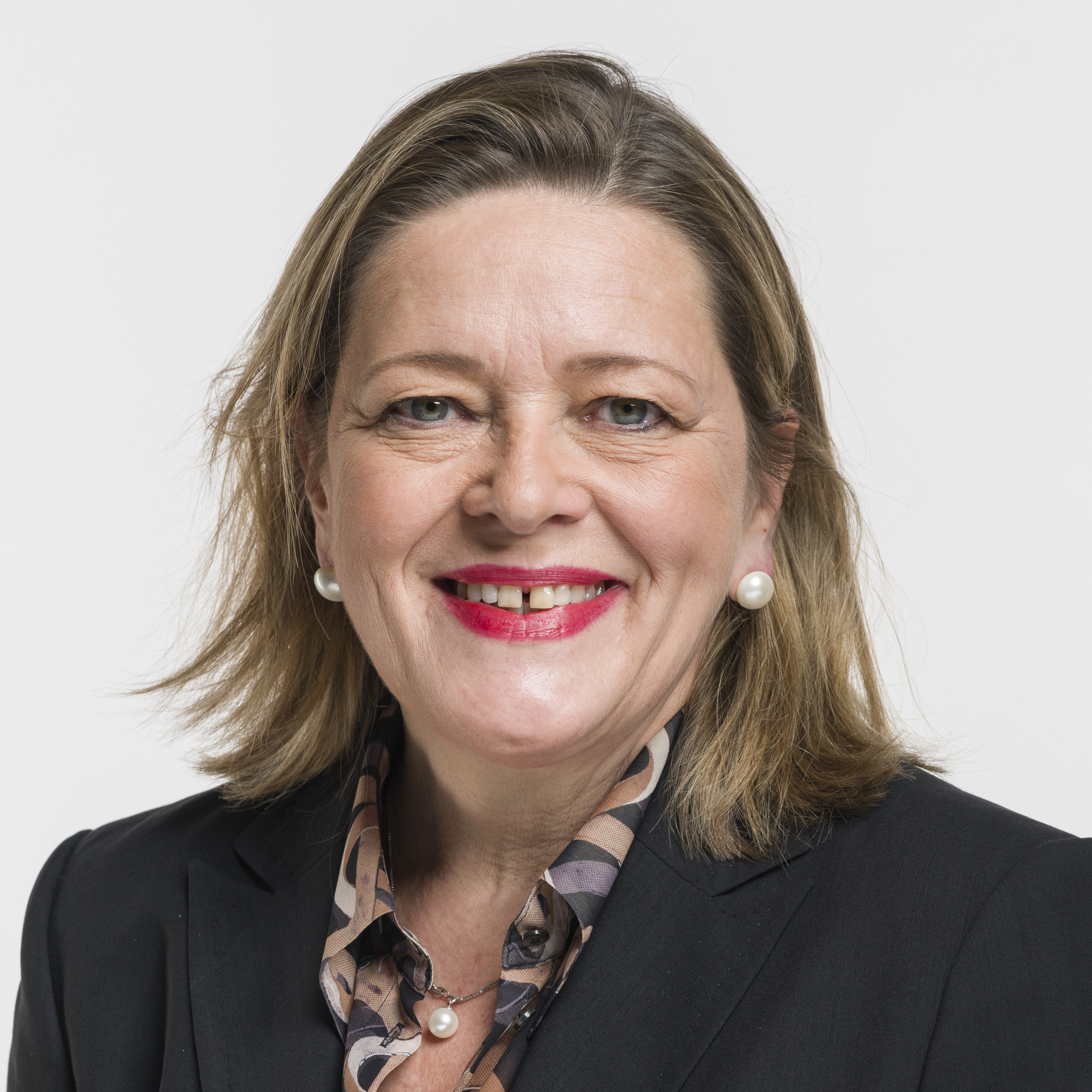
State Councillor
Heidi Z'graggen
of Uri

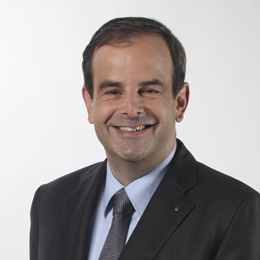
National Councillor
Gerhard Pfister
from Zug

Viola Amherd had already received 16 votes in the election to fill Eveline Widmer-Schlumpf's seat in 2015 although she had not put her name forward as a candidate. She described herself as "in the center of the center".

Amherd was seen as more likely to win, 75% chance according to a SonntagsZeitung and MatinDimanche analysis; she benefited of the agrarians, the states councillors, and the CVP group while Z'graggen was expected to lead in the FDP and SVP groups.

The CVP, SP, and GPS endorsed both declared candidates. The SVP endorsed Heidi Z'graggen, while the GLP and BDP endorsed Viola Amherd.

=== Schneider-Ammann's seat ===
The center-right party FDP.The Liberals fielded two candidates, both from allemanic Switzerland even though all cantonal parties could submit candidacies:

- Karin Keller-Sutter (FDP-SG), States Councillor for Saint-Gallen (2011–) and President of the Council of States (2017–)
- Hans Wicki (FDP-NW), States Councillor for Nidwalden (2015–) and former Nidwalden Executive Councillor (2010–2016)
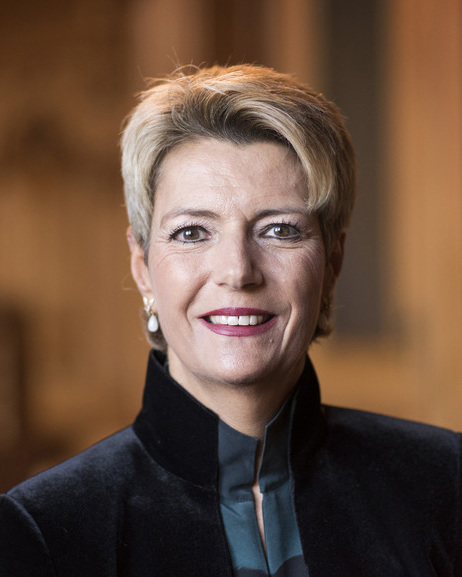
States Councillor
Karin Keller-Sutter
from Saint-Gallen

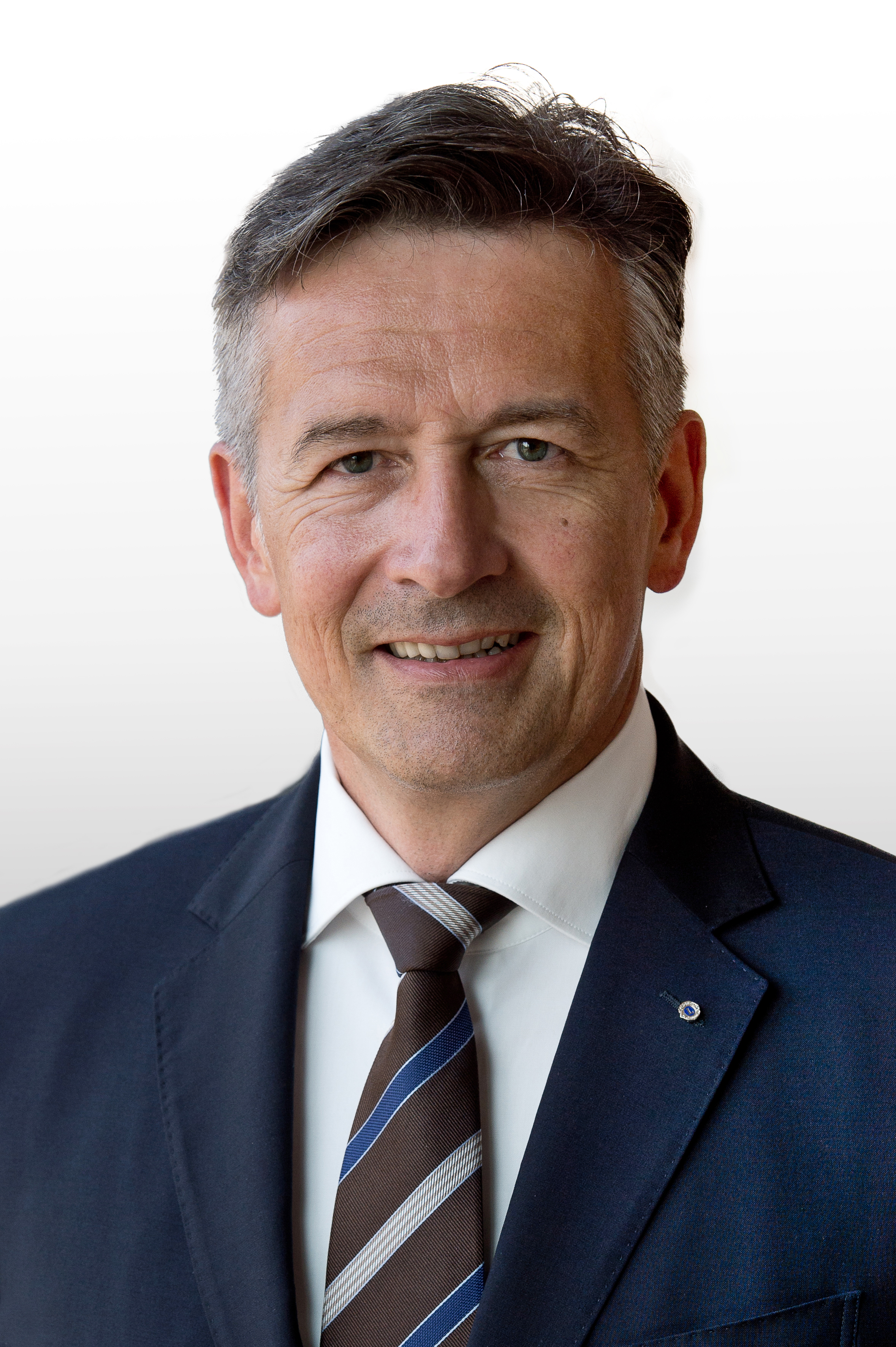
States Councillor
Hans Wicki
from Nidwalden

Karin Keller-Sutter had been a candidate in 2010 to replace Hans-Rudolf Merz (FDP-AR) but was eliminated in the 4th round after only receiving 74 votes, trailing Jean-François Rime (SVP-BE) by 2 votes and to-be-elected Johann Schneider-Ammann by 10 votes. She was seen this time as the front-runner and the party even originally considered only fielding her; a two-person ticket was ultimately proposed since it gives other parties freedom of choice and lowers the risks of surprises.

Hans Wicki was minister for the infrastructures in his canton, and emphasized the under-representation of low-population Central Swiss cantons.

The FDP and CVP endorsed both candidates. The SVP, SP, GPS, BDP, and GLP all endorsed Karin Keller-Sutter.

== Results ==
=== Seat vacated by Doris Leuthard ===
Viola Amherd was elected to the Federal Council in the first round. She swore oath on the same day and assumed her seat on 1 January 2019.

Despite her being elected slightly earlier, the Federal Council voted to give Keller-Sutter priority to choose her department. Amherd ultimately received the head of the Federal Department of Defence, Civil Protection and Sport, considered the least senior position in the council. The department's former head, Guy Parmelin, succeeded Schneider-Ammann as head of the EAER.

Candidate	Party	Round 1
Viola Amherd	CVP	148
Heidi Z'Graggen	CVP	60
Gerhard Pfister	CVP	17
Others		15
Valid votes		240
Absolute majority		121
Invalid votes		0
Blank votes		4
Votes cast		244

=== Seat vacated by Johann Schneider-Ammann ===
Karin Keller-Sutter was elected to the Federal Council in the first round. She swore oath on the same day and assumed her seat on 1 January 2019.

She took the head of the Federal Department of Justice and Police, formerly headed by Simonetta Sommaruga who in turn assumed Leuthard's position as head of the DETEC.

Candidate	Party	Round 1
Karin Keller-Sutter	FDP	154
Hans Wicki	FDP	56
Others		27
Valid votes		237
Absolute majority		119
Invalid votes		0
Blank votes		6
Votes cast		244

=== Presidential and vice presidential selection ===
2018 Swiss presidential election
← 2017	5 December 2018	2019 →
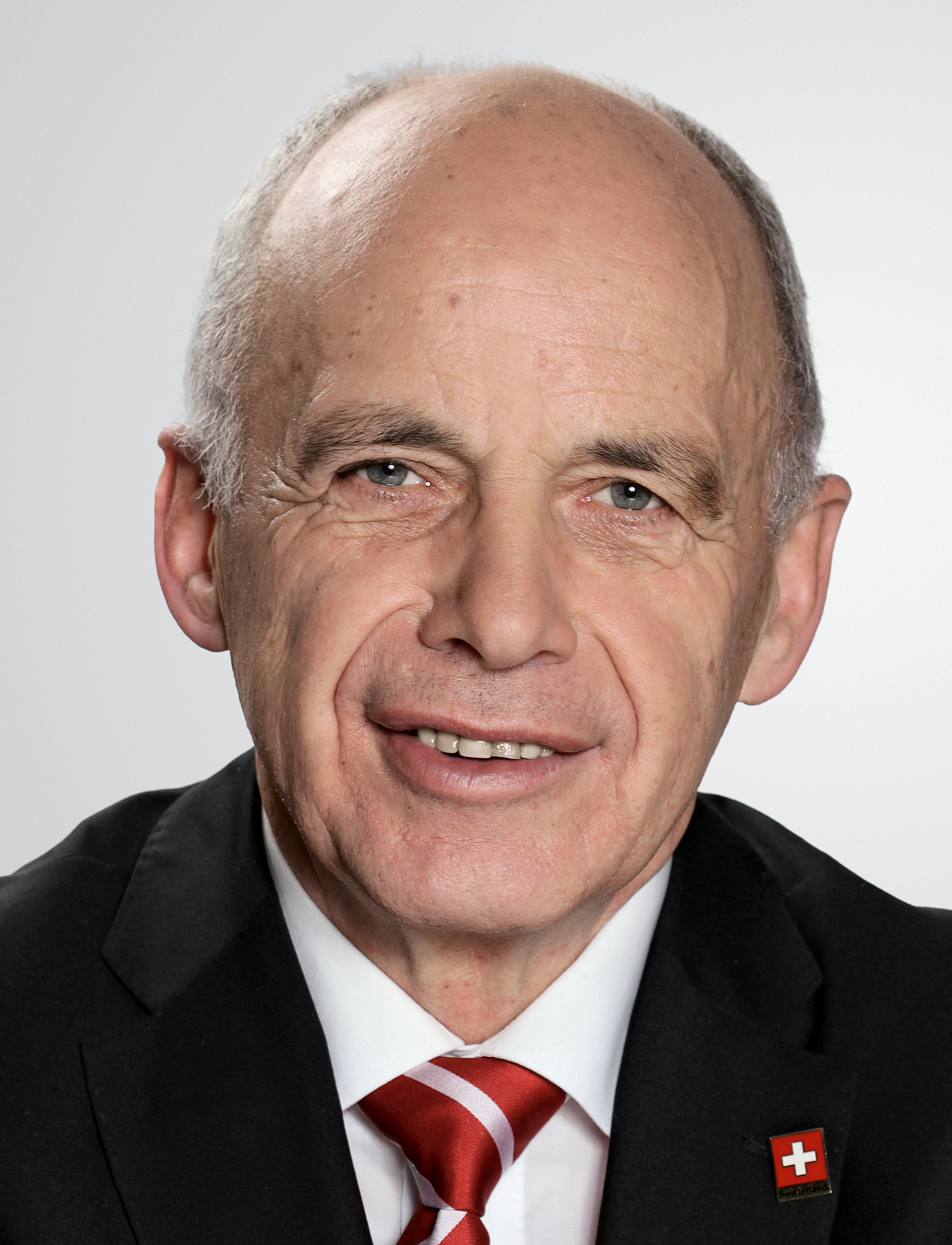
Candidate	Ueli Maurer
Party	Swiss People's
Electoral vote	201 / 209
President before election
Alain Berset
Elected President
Ueli Maurer

==== President of the Confederation ====
The President of the Confederation is a member of the Federal Council elected every year, with no additional powers apart from chairing meetings of the Federal Council. Ueli Maurer (SVP-ZH) was supported by all groups, as he had served the longest on the Federal Council since being last president in 2013 and was vice-president the previous year.

Candidate	Party	Round 1
Ueli Maurer	SVP	201
Others		8
Valid votes		209
Absolute majority		105
Invalid votes		7
Blank votes		16
Votes cast		232

==== Vice President of the Federal Council ====
The Vice President of the Federal Council is a member of the Federal Council elected every year like the President, and the presumptive president for the next year. Simonetta Sommaruga (SP-BE) was supported by all groups, as she had served the longest on the Federal Council since her last presidency in 2015.

Candidate	Party	Round 1
Simonetta Sommaruga	SP	196
Others		20
Valid votes		216
Absolute majority		109
Invalid votes		10
Blank votes		13
Votes cast		239
