= Schweizerisches Konsumentenforum =

Swiss consumer advocacy organization founded in 1961

- Abbreviation: KF
- Formation: December 1, 1961
- Founder: Alliance of Swiss Women's Organizations
- Type: Consumer organization
- Purpose: Consumer protection and advocacy
- Headquarters: Bern, Switzerland
- Region served: Switzerland
- Official language: German, Italian, French
- President: Babette Sigg Frank
- Website: https://konsum.ch

The Schweizerisches Konsumentenforum (KF, Swiss Consumer Forum) is a Swiss consumer organization founded in 1961 that informs consumers about purchasing decisions and represents their interests to economic and political circles. The organization regularly conducts product testing, delegates members to commissions and working groups, and promotes consumer protection at various levels. Its profile is similar to that of the Stiftung für Konsumentenschutz (SKS), which has existed since 1964, though the KF appears closer to business circles and less affiliated with the Social Democratic Party of Switzerland than the SKS.

== History ==
=== Foundation and early years ===
The organization was founded in Zurich on December 1, 1961, under the original name Konsumentinnenforum der deutschen Schweiz und des Kantons Tessin (Consumer Forum of German-speaking Switzerland and Ticino). The Fédération romande des consommatrices, founded in 1959 in French-speaking Switzerland, served as a model for its German-speaking and Ticinese counterparts. Despite close collaboration between the two organizations, they never merged.

The decisive impetus for its creation came from the Alliance of Swiss Women's Organizations (BSF). The founding members included two other major umbrella organizations: Evangelische Frauen Schweiz and the Schweizerischer Katholischer Frauenbund, along with nine women's associations active at the Swiss level and thirteen liaison centers of Swiss women's associations. Some mixed-gender organizations quickly joined, but remained underrepresented for decades. Originally, the forum aimed to be apolitical and non-denominational.

The grouping of women around consumption issues in the forum's early years was part of the broader women's movement, which gained momentum after the rejection of women's suffrage in 1959. Women's organizations gained membership and demanded not only voting and election rights, but more broadly greater participation in all areas of political, social and economic life. Additionally, consumption patterns were changing: the constantly growing supply of products in the post-war economic boom confronted people with more consumption choices, made more complicated rather than simplified by the professionalization of advertising. The need for objective information and decision aids such as those offered by the forum was correspondingly great.

=== Product testing and publications ===
Among the forum's initial tasks were product testing, particularly of oils and fats and detergents. A professional testing system was established in 1965 under the presidency of Socialist Emilie Lieberherr. From 1969, the association published prüf mit, an advertising-free magazine in which test results were published. Subscriptions to prüf mit represented an important source of revenue for the forum until the 1990s, which were marked by massive losses due to competition from commercial consumer magazines. The decision to end the publication of prüf mit was made in autumn 1997 under the leadership of Alliance of Independents (AdI) member Margrit Krüger.

After being less present in the public domain from the late 1990s, the forum published a new annual publication from 2005 in the form of a concerns barometer (Sorgenbarometer, from 2009 Pulsmesser). The association's headquarters was moved from Zurich to Bern in 2009 to get closer to political decision-making centers.

=== Political activity ===
Another essential task of the forum from the beginning was representing consumer interests in consultation procedures and in working groups of various economic partners. A major success in this regard was the 1982 passage of the initiative "to prevent abuses in price formation." The popular initiative, launched by the then-president, AdI National Councillor Monika Weber, subsequently contributed to Weber's election to the National Council. Normally, forum representatives in commissions focused on less important and more concrete questions, such as price labeling for fruits and vegetables in retail trade, harmonization of textile labels, or more recently, contractual conditions in online commerce.

=== Modern developments ===
The KF focused more on e-commerce: the Konsumhelden group, created in September 2013, specifically targets young consumers, and in November of the same year, the KF opened a mediation service for e-commerce. In 2014, the forum established a political committee in which only bourgeois parties were represented. The KF thus abandoned the principle of partisan balance that had originally been part of its identity.

== Leadership ==
The organization changed its name to Schweizerisches Konsumentenforum in 1998 with the aim of reaching a broader audience. The founders had chosen a feminine formulation in 1961 because the forum was born from the women's movement and at that time, shopping, household budget management and product use were considered feminine tasks.

- 1961–1963: Yvonne Rudolf-Benoit
- 1963–1965: Claire Schibler-Kaegi
- 1965–1978: Emilie Lieberherr
- 1978–1986: Monika Weber
- 1986–1998: Margrit Krüger
- 1998–2002: Katharina Hasler
- 2002–2004: Liselotte Steffen (ad interim)
- 2004–2013: Franziska Troesch-Schnyder
- 2013–present: Babette Sigg Frank

== Publications ==
The forum has published several magazines over the years:

- 1969–1997: prüf mit
- 1999–2013: KF-Info
- 2005–2008: Sorgenbarometer
- 2009–present: Pulsmesser

== Bibliography ==
- Konsumentinnenforum Schweiz (ed.): 30 Jahre Konsumentinnenforum, 1991.
- Studer, Brigitte; Tanner, Jakob: "Konsum und Distribution", in: Halbeisen, Patrick; Müller, Margrit; Veyrassat, Béatrice (ed.): Wirtschaftsgeschichte der Schweiz im 20. Jahrhundert, 2012, pp. 637-702, especially 692-695.
