= 2017 Swiss Federal Council election =

2017 Swiss Federal Council by-election
- 20 September 2017

1 of the 7 Federal Councillors
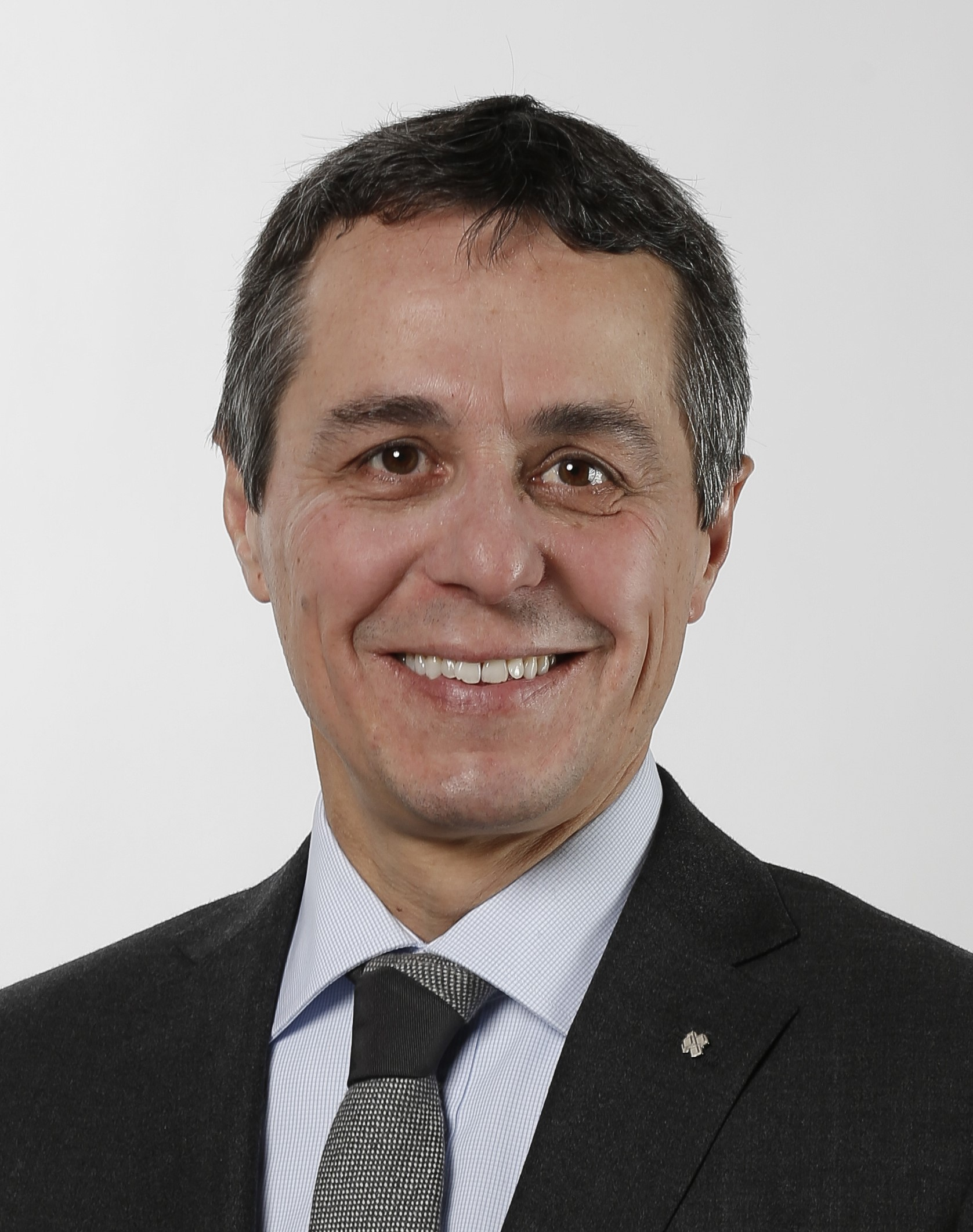

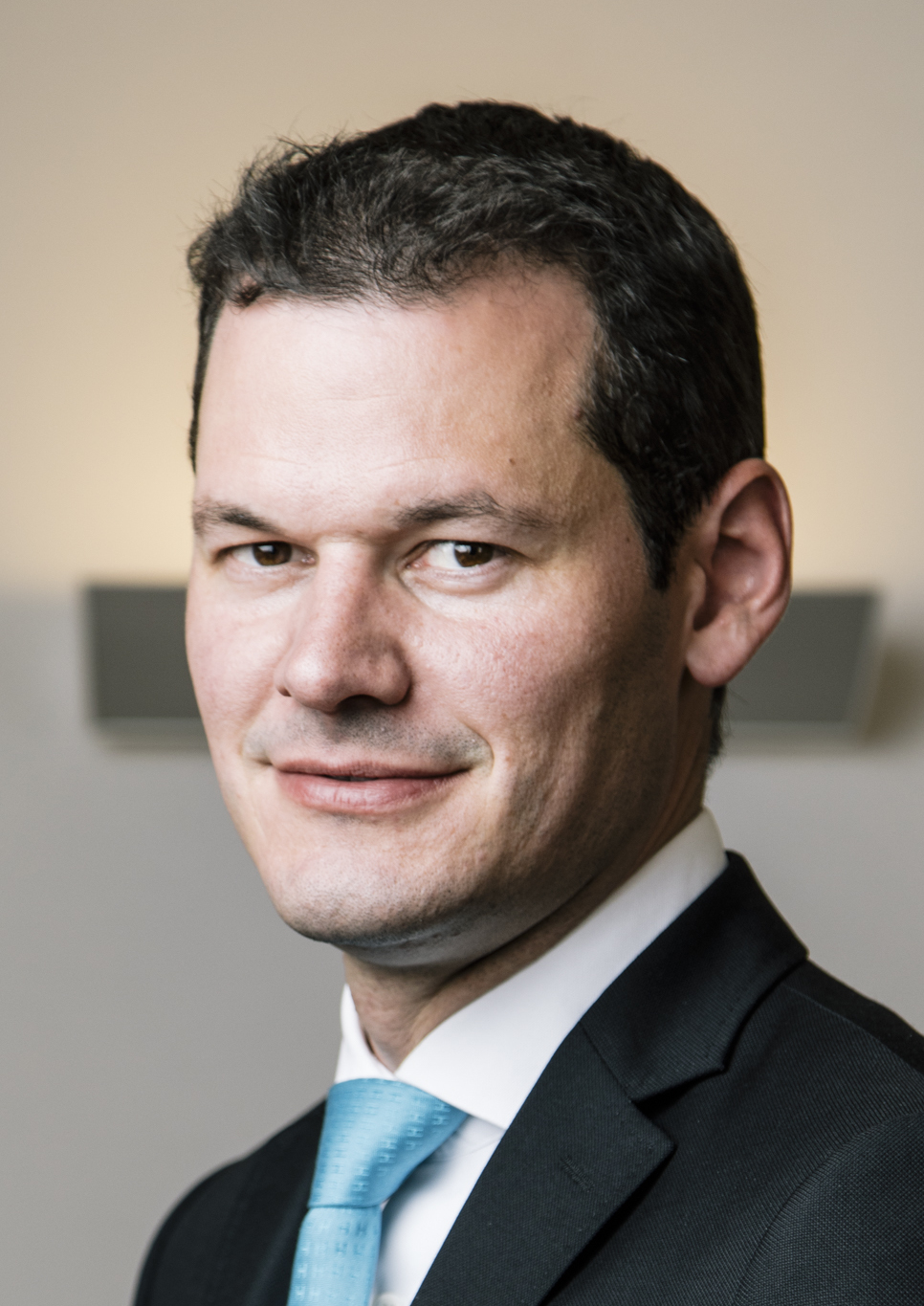

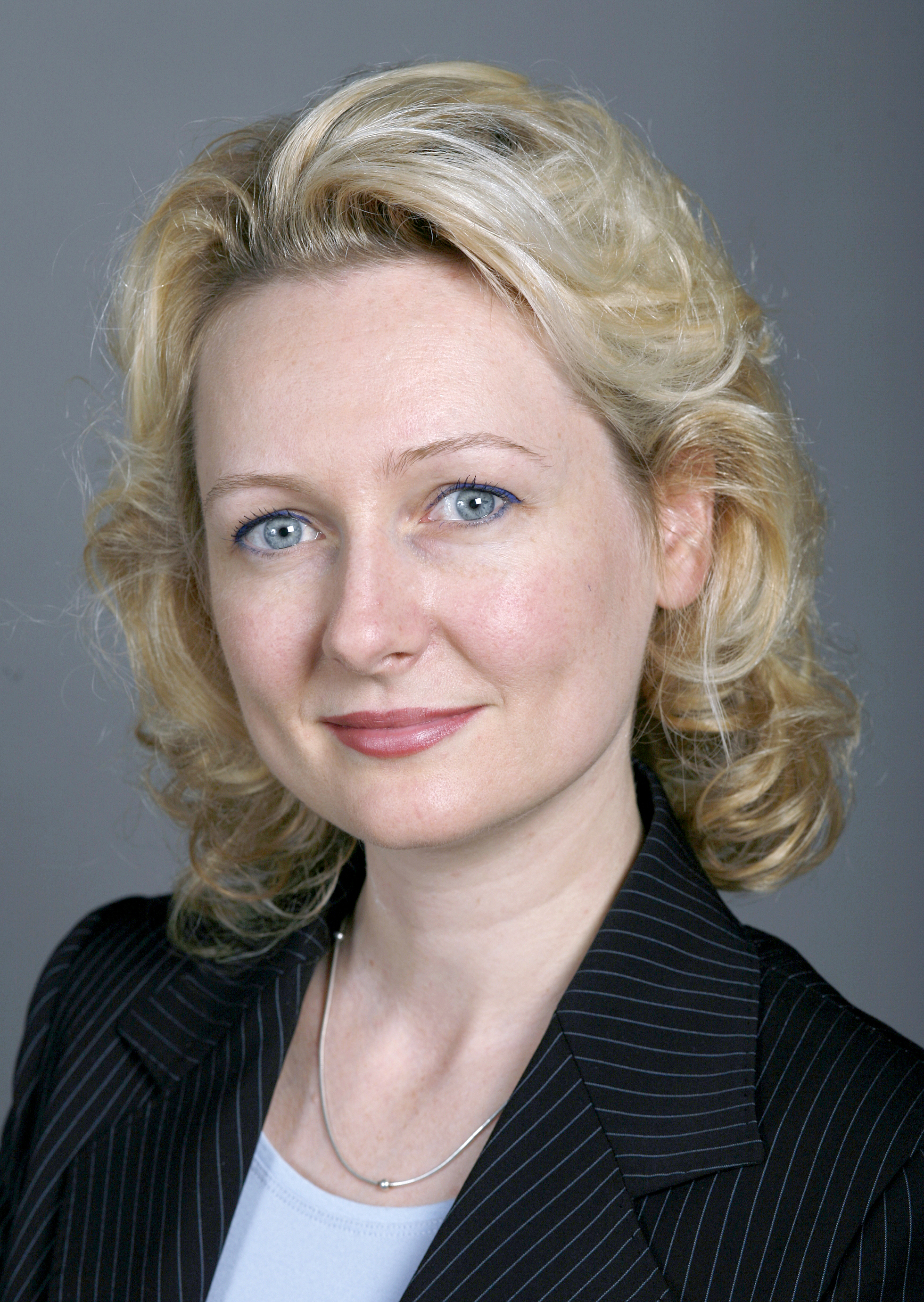
| | First party | Second party | Third party |
|---|---|---|---|
| Candidate | Ignazio Cassis | Pierre Maudet | Isabelle Moret |
| Party | FDP.The Liberals | FDP.The Liberals | FDP.The Liberals |
| 1st round | 109 | 62 | 55 |
| 2nd round | 125 | 90 | 28 |

A by-election to the Swiss Federal Council was held on 20 September 2017, after federal councillor Didier Burkhalter (FDP-NE) announced he would leave the Council effective 31 October 2017. The by-election resulted in the election of Ignazio Cassis (FDP-TI), resulting in no change in the partisan composition of the council.

The election of the President of the Confederation was later held on 6 December 2017, choosing Alain Berset (SP-FR) as president for the year 2018, following the expected rotating order of the ceremonial presidency.

== Background ==
In Switzerland, the 7-seat executive Federal Council is apportioned between the parties following the unwritten agreement known as the Magic formula. The formula was followed from 1959 to 2008, and re-appeared in 2015; since 2003 the composition is: SVP 2 seats, SP 2 seats, FDP 2 seats, and CVP 1 seat.

Federal councillors are traditionally re-elected until they step down, only four ever lost re-election. Councillors more often stand down during their term as it allows their party to get more visibility at a moment other than shortly after a general election.

On 14 June 2017, the FDP councillor Didier Burkhalter (elected to the council in 2009) announced he would resign effective 31 October. Following the Magic formula, only the FDP fielded candidates for his seat.

=== Electoral system ===
The seat is elected using an absolute majority with an exhaustive ballot. In the first two rounds members of the Federal Assembly can vote for anyone eligible, but only those receiving at least ten votes are announced in the results; from the third round onwards only candidates who received at least ten votes in one of the first two rounds are eligible, the last-placed candidate is eliminated until someone reaches an overall majority.

== Candidates ==
Three candidates stood, all three fielded by the center-right party FDP.The Liberals:

- Isabelle Moret (FDP-VD), National Councillor for Vaud (2006–)
- Ignazio Cassis (FDP-TI), National Councillor for Ticino (2007–)
- Pierre Maudet (FDP-GE), Geneva Executive Councillor (2012–) and former Mayor of Geneva (2011–2012)
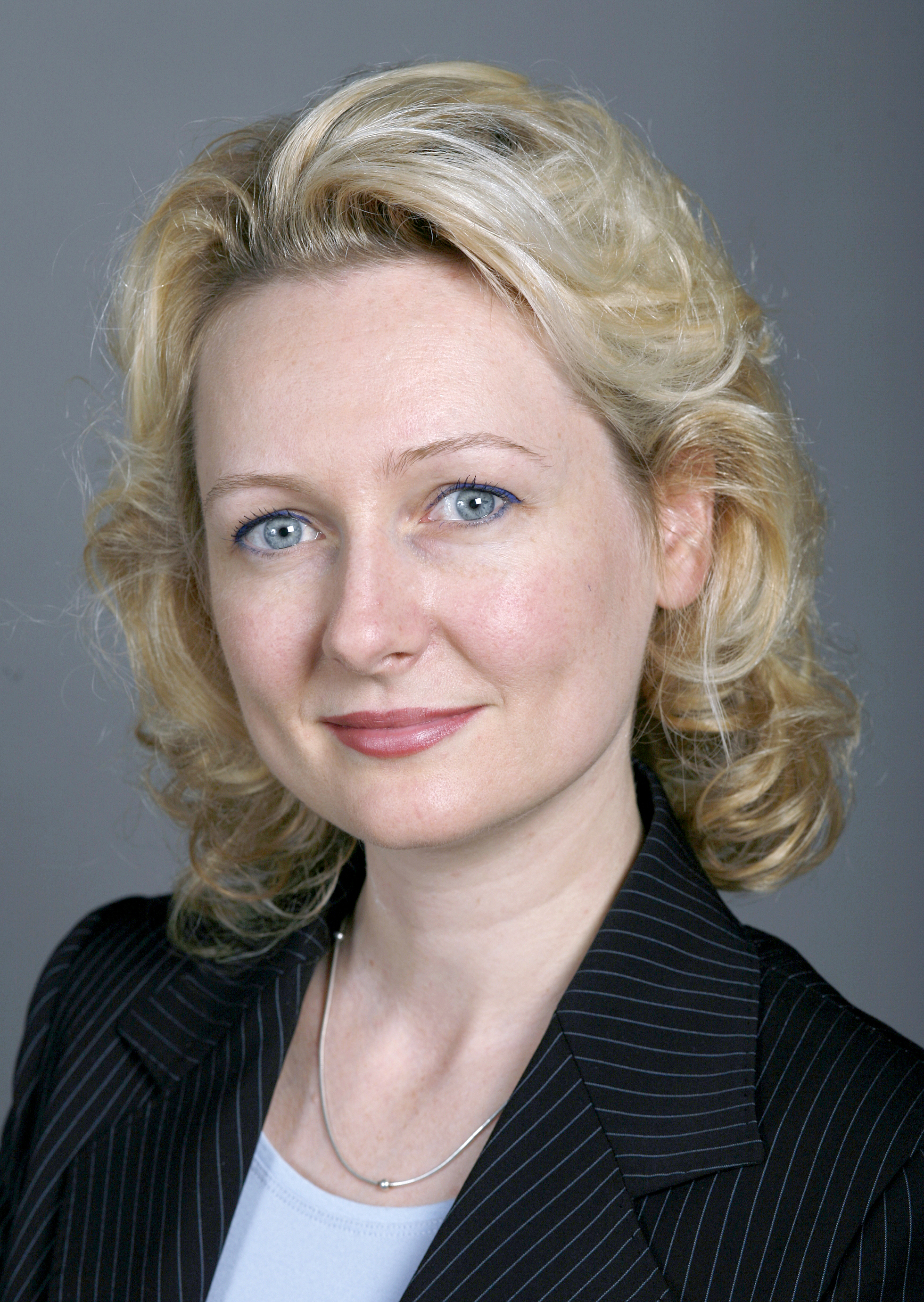
National Councillor
Isabelle Moret
from Vaud

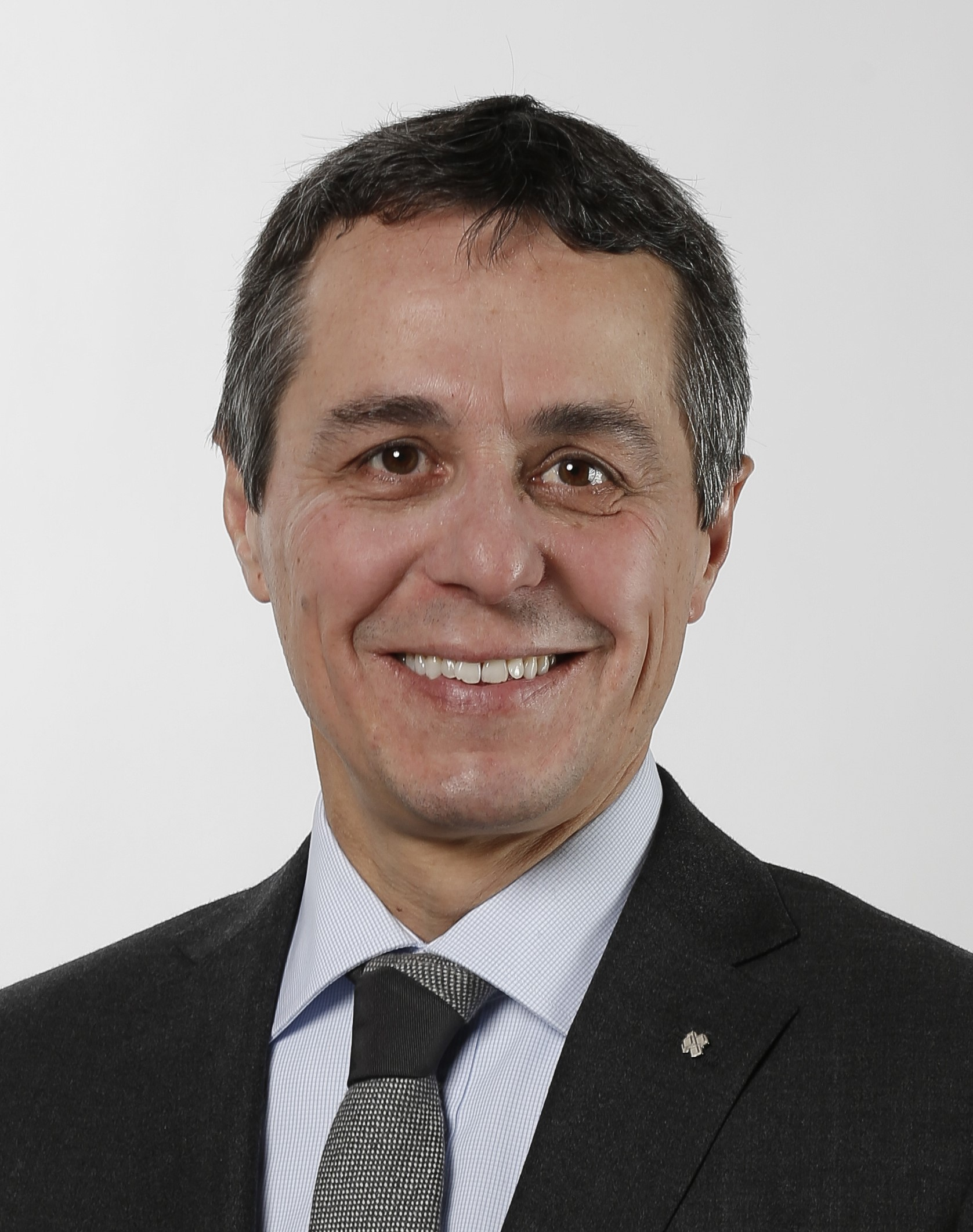
National Councillor
Ignazio Cassis
from Ticino

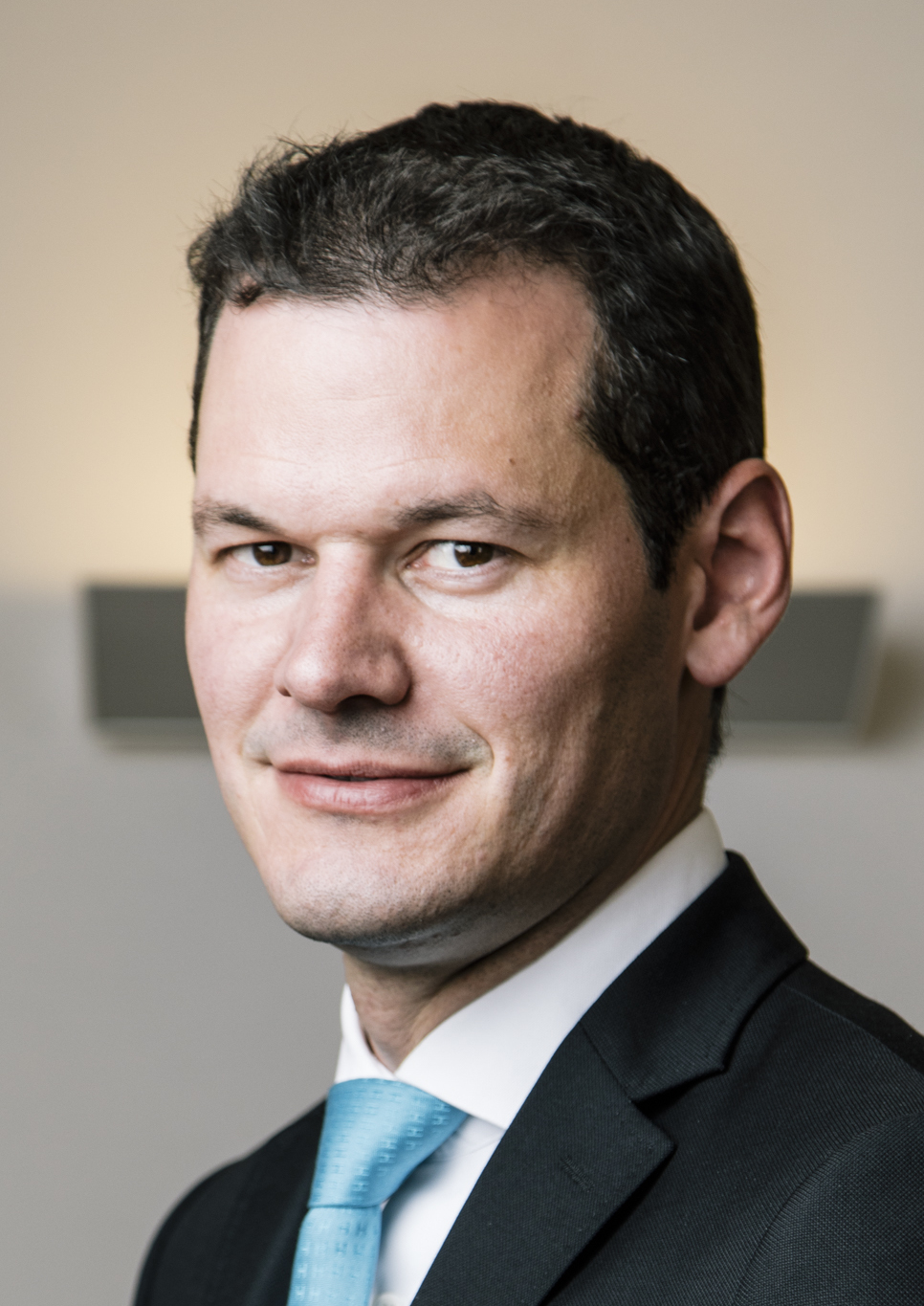
Executive Councillor
Pierre Maudet
of Geneva

The FDP selected these three candidates from propositions by their cantonal components. Since the FDP's other federal councillor (Johann Schneider-Ammann) is from Berne, a German-speaking canton, and the party is most present in several romand cantons and in Ticino, the three candidates selected for this seat are from "latin Switzerland".

Due to all parties being implied in the vote, the candidates' ideological differences entered in play as they tried forming a coalition to be elected. In an interview in September, Cassis used anti-immigration and more economically liberal rhetoric to appeal to largest party, the SVP; in return the party endorsed him early while opposing Maudet's pro-European positions

The FDP and GLP groups supported all three candidates. The Swiss People's Party group supported Cassis, the Greens group supported Moret, and the BDP group supported Maudet; the CVP group did not formally propose any candidate but was expected to mostly support Cassis.

== Results ==
=== Seat vacated by Didier Burkhalter ===
Ignazio Cassis was elected to the Federal Council in the second round.

Cassis swore oath on the same day and assumed his seat on 1 November. After initial speculation on Alain Berset or Guy Parmelin taking Burkhalter's former position, no reshuffling occurred and he assumed the head of the Federal Department of Foreign Affairs.

The outcome was generally seen as expected. SVP leader Albert Rösti (SVP-BE) later emphasized his party's role in the outcome, as the SVP was the only other party to have directly supported Cassis and was the largest party in the Federal Assembly with 70 seats. Green leader Regula Rytz (GPS-BE) and cantonal executive councillor Jacqueline de Quattro (FDP-Vaud) deplored the non-election of a woman in the council; de Quattro cited the attention given to Moret's parental duties, and proposed a two-women ticket in the next election, which would be achieved the following year.

Cassis' election was celebrated in front of the Federal Palace and in Ticino, as the canton had not been represented in the Federal Council since Flavio Cotti (CVP-TI) in 1999.

| Candidate | Party | Round 1 | Round 2 |
|---|---|---|---|
| Ignazio Cassis | FDP | 109 | 125 |
| Pierre Maudet | FDP | 62 | 90 |
| Isabelle Moret | FDP | 55 | 28 |
| Others | | 16 | 1 |
| Valid votes | | 242 | 244 |
| Absolute majority | | 122 | 123 |
| Invalid votes | | 0 | 0 |
| Blank votes | | 3 | 2 |
| Votes cast | | 245 | 246 |

=== Presidential and vice presidential selection ===
2017 Swiss presidential election
- 6 December 2017
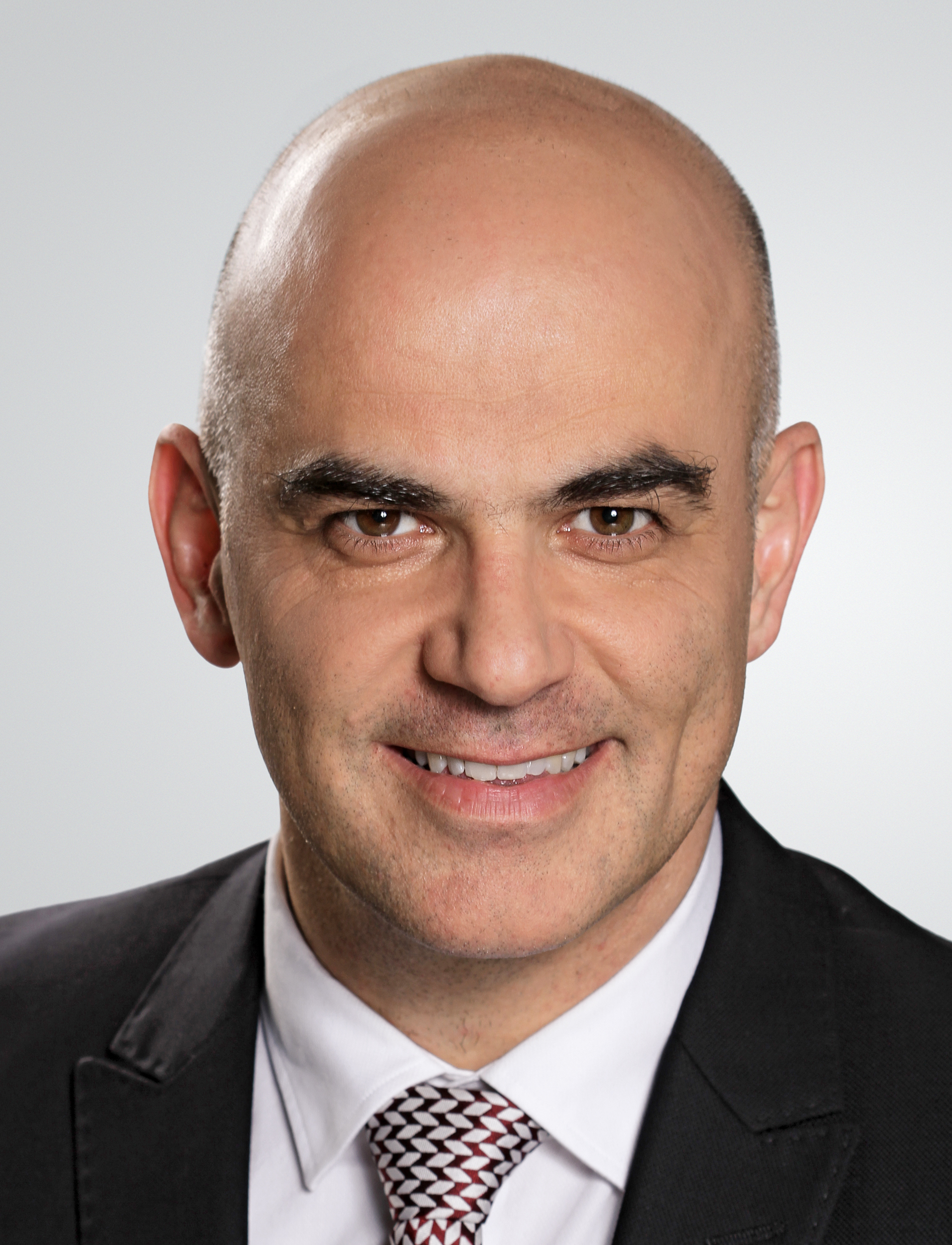
| Candidate | Alain Berset |
| Party | Social Democrats |
| Electoral vote | 190 / 210 |
President before election
Doris Leuthard
Elected President
Alain Berset

==== President of the Confederation ====
The President of the Confederation is a member of the Federal Council elected every year, with no additional powers apart from chairing meetings of the Federal Council. Alain Berset (SP-FR) was supported by all groups, as he had served the longest on the Federal Council since 2012 without being president and was vice-president the previous year.

| Candidate | Party | Round 1 |
|---|---|---|
| Alain Berset | SP | 190 |
| Others | | 20 |
| Valid votes | | 210 |
| Absolute majority | | 106 |
| Invalid votes | | 4 |
| Blank votes | | 14 |
| Votes cast | | 228 |

==== Vice President of the Federal Council ====
The Vice President of the Federal Council is a member of the Federal Council elected every year like the President, and the presumptive president for the next year. Ueli Maurer (SVP-ZH) was supported by all groups, as he had served the longest on the Federal Council since his last presidency in 2013.

| Candidate | Party | Round 1 |
|---|---|---|
| Ueli Maurer | SVP | 178 |
| Others | | 14 |
| Valid votes | | 192 |
| Absolute majority | | 97 |
| Invalid votes | | 11 |
| Blank votes | | 27 |
| Votes cast | | 230 |
