= 2019 Swiss Federal Council election =

| ← 2015 (regular) ← 2018 (by-) | 11 December 2019 | 2022 (by-) → 2023 (regular) → |

All 7 Federal Councillors
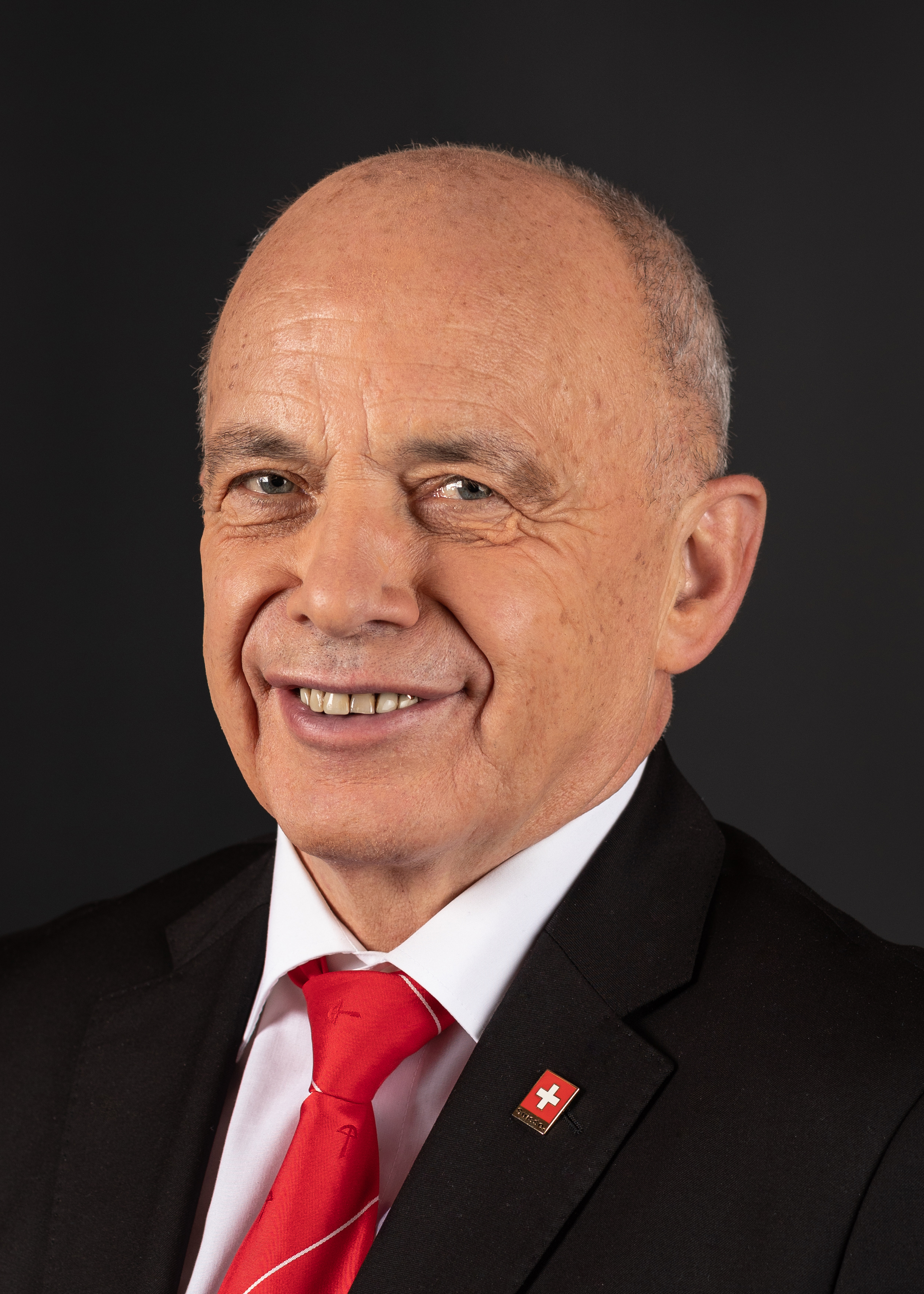

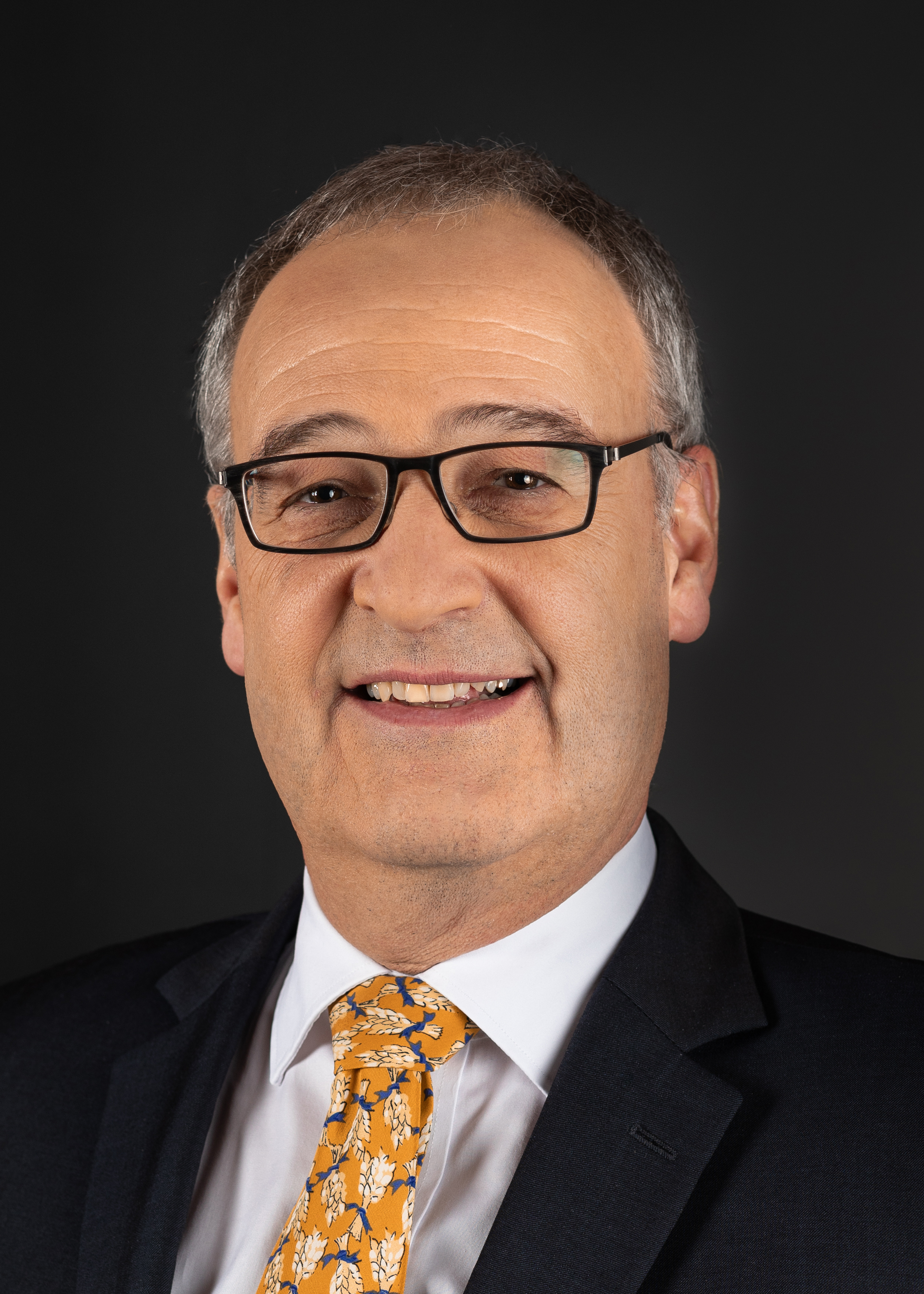

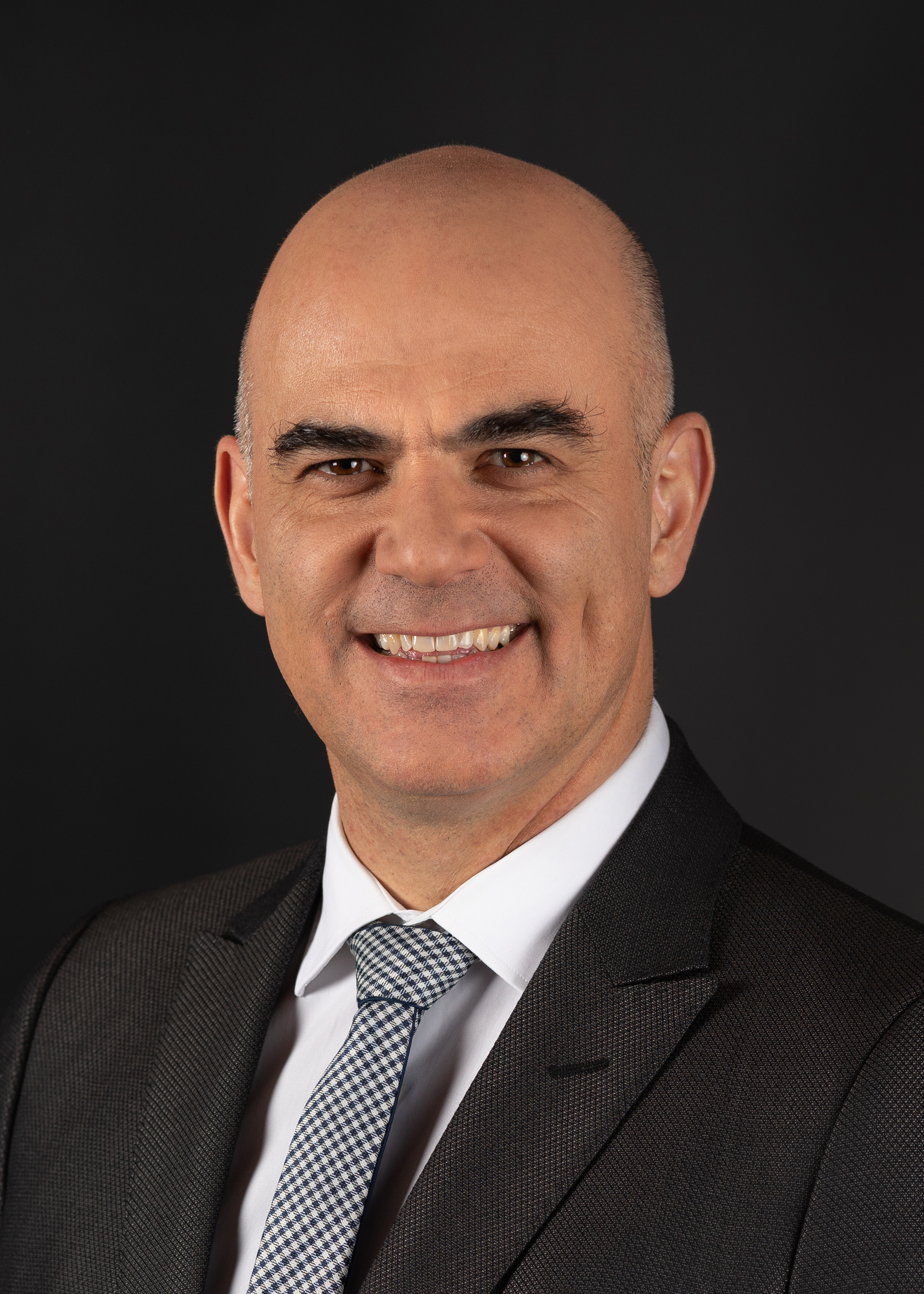

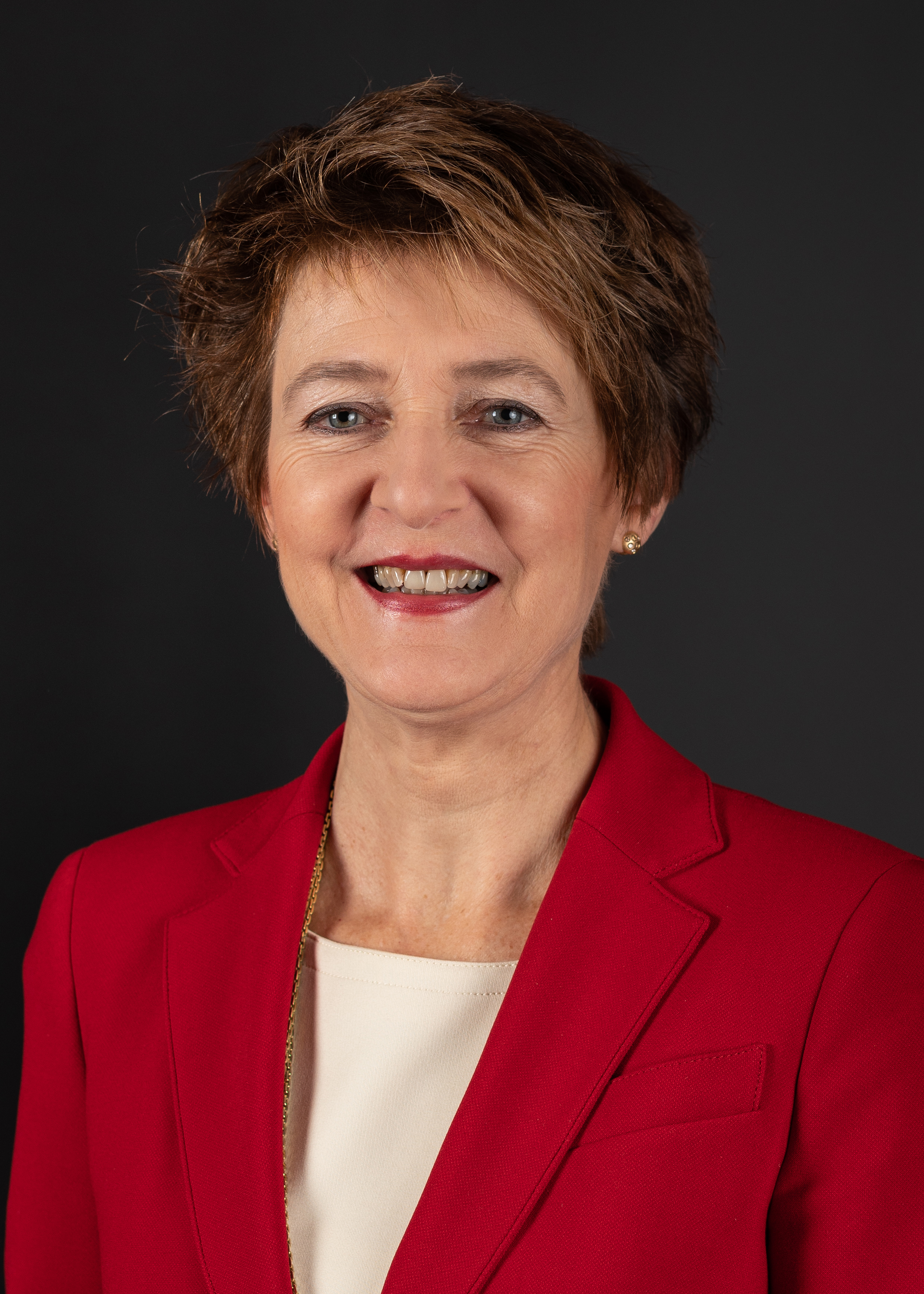

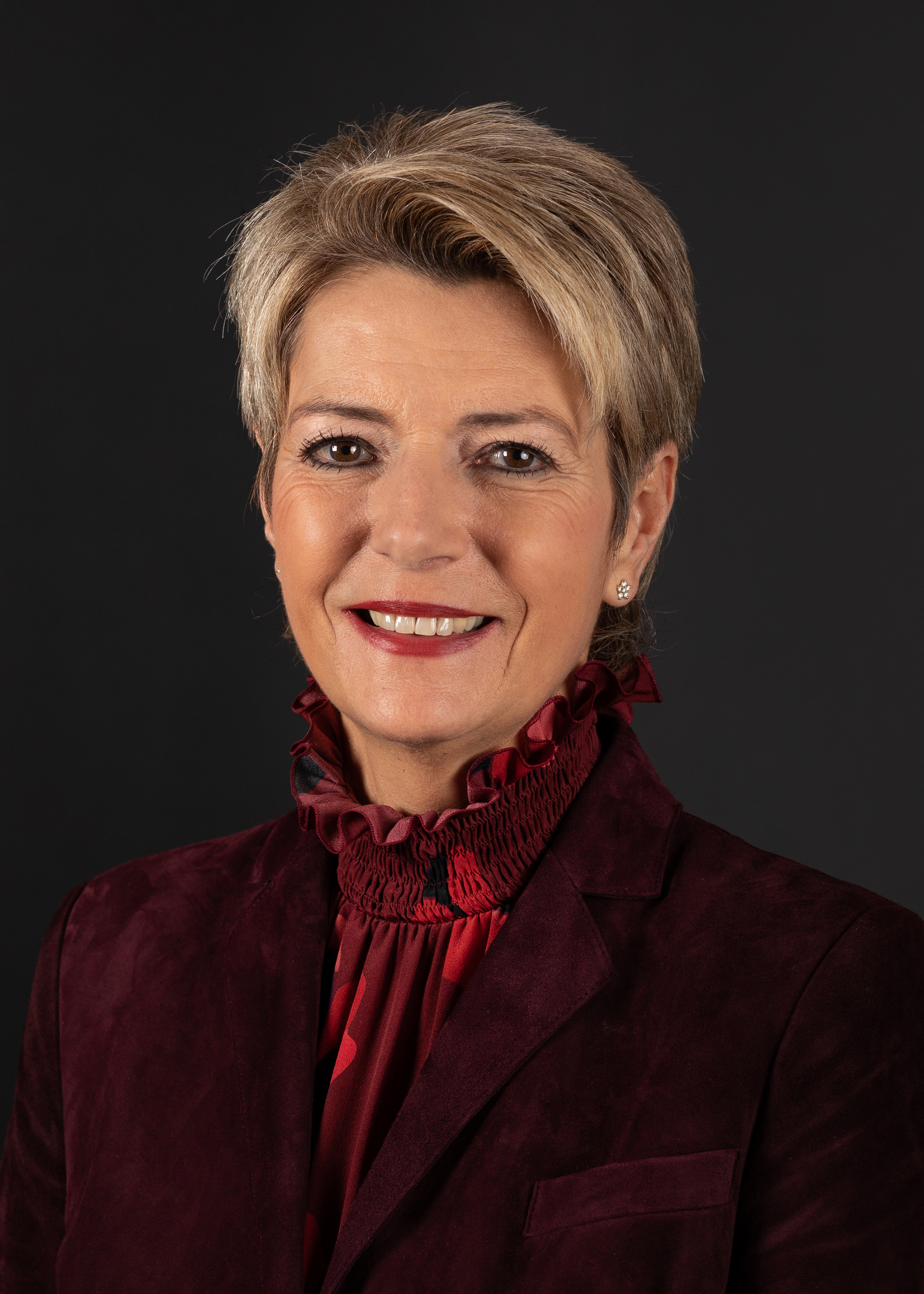

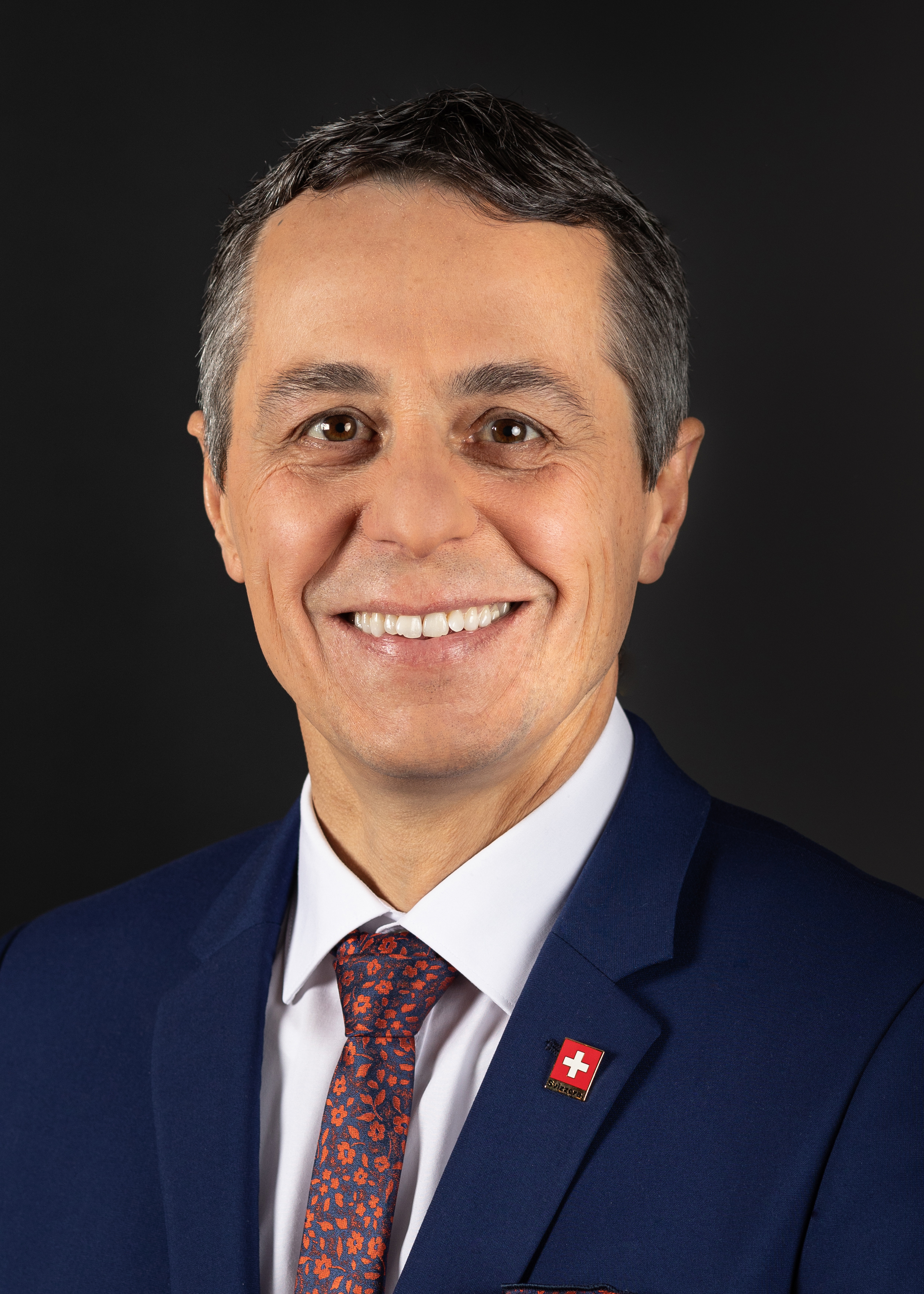

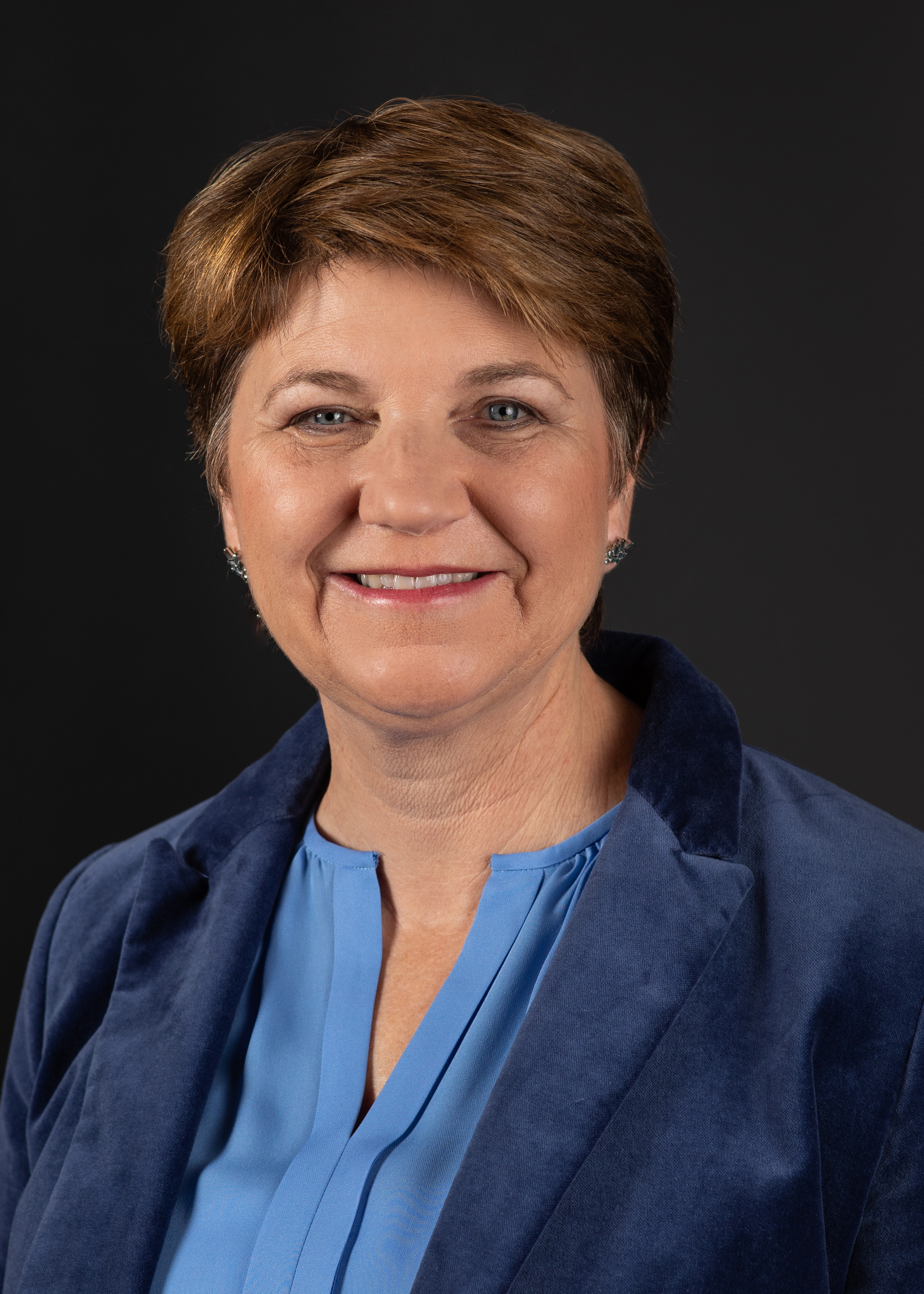
| | First party | Second party |
|---|---|---|
| Party | Swiss People's | Social Democrats |
| Elected | Ueli Maurer; 213 votes | Alain Berset; 214 votes |
| | Guy Parmelin; 191 votes | Simonetta Sommaruga; 192 votes |
| | Third party | Fourth party |
| Party | FDP.The Liberals | Christian Democrats |
| Elected | Karin Keller-Sutter; 169 votes | Viola Amherd; 218 votes |
| | Ignazio Cassis; 145 votes |

An election for all seven members of the Federal Council, the Government of Switzerland, was held on 11 December 2019, following the federal election on 20 October 2019, for the 2020–2024 term.

All Federal Councillors were reelected to their seats by the Federal Assembly in the first round of voting, either for another full four-year term (Ueli Maurer, Simonetta Sommaruga, Alain Berset, Guy Parmelin) or a first full four-year term (Ignazio Cassis, Viola Amherd, Karin Keller-Sutter). No portfolio changes were made after the election.

== Background ==
The Federal Council is the federal executive of Switzerland. It is composed of 7 members, elected for a 4-year term by both houses of the Swiss parliament sitting together as the Federal Assembly after each federal election. Decisions are taken collegially, only deferring to a vote when no consensus can be reached; decisions once taken are then defended by the entire council acting as a single decision-maker.

Any Swiss eligible to the National Council is eligible to the Federal Council, but historically most councillors elected are members of the legislature. Elections are held using secret ballot and candidate need an overall majority of valid votes to be elected. Each seat is elected independently and sequentially, in order of seniority (the seat of the longest-serving federal councillor is first up).

The parliament cannot remove from office any councillor nor vote a non-confidence motion against it. Federal councillors are usually re-elected until they resign, sometimes during their term (calling for a by-election); only four have been unseated in the Council's history.

=== Magic formula ===
The Magic formula is an unwritten agreement between the parties to share the seats on the Federal Council as a national unity coalition. The three largest parties (SVP, SP, and FDP) receive 2 seats each, and the fourth largest party (CVP) receives the last seat (2–2–2–1). It was used since 1959, with the exception of a period between 2007 and 2015 after the SVP/UDC expelled its two federal councillors.

The formula was put in question after the surge in votes of the greens and green-liberals in the federal election a month earlier; the traditional 4 parties only represented 68.9% of the National Council which was the lowest in history. Calls were made either to replace the formula with a five-party coalition (2–2–1–1–1) or expand its size to nine seats, the latter was rejected by referendum last time in 1942 but it is also seen as a way to split the two largest federal departments.

== Federal Assembly ==
| Parliamentary group | Parties | NR/CN | SR/CdÉ | Total | % |
|---|---|---|---|---|---|
| Group of the Swiss People's Party | SVP/UDC, Lega, EDU/UDF, Ind. (Note: One SVP-caucusing independent in the Council of States.) | 55 | 7 | 62 | 25.2% |
| Social-democratic group | SP/PS | 39 | 9 | 48 | 19.5% |
| Center Group CVP-EVP-BDP | CVP/PDC, EVP/PEV, BDP/PBD | 31 | 13 | 44 | 17.9% |
| FDP-Liberal group | FDP/PLR | 29 | 12 | 41 | 16.7% |
| Green group | GPS/PÉS, PST, SolS | 30 | 5 | 35 | 14.2% |
| Green-liberal group | GLP/PVL | 16 | 0 | 16 | 6.5% |

== Incumbents ==
Incumbents, in descending order of seniority, including political party affiliation and department at the time of the election:

- Ueli Maurer (SVP/UDC), from Zürich, head of the Federal Department of Finance,
- Simonetta Sommaruga (SPS/PSS), from Bern, head of the Federal Department of Environment, Transport, Energy and Communications,
- Alain Berset (SPS/PSS), from Fribourg, head of the Federal Department of Home Affairs,
- Guy Parmelin (SVP/UDC), from Vaud, head of the Federal Department of Economic Affairs, Education and Research,
- Ignazio Cassis (FDP.The Liberals), from Ticino, head of the Federal Department of Foreign Affairs,
- Viola Amherd (CVP/PDC), from Valais, head of the Federal Department of Defence, Civil Protection and Sport,
- Karin Keller-Sutter (FDP.The Liberals), from St. Gallen, head of the Federal Department of Justice and Police.

All groups supported the re-election of all federal councillors, with the exception of the greens and social-democrats who supported Green Party leader Regula Rytz to take Ignazio Cassis' seat.

== Results ==
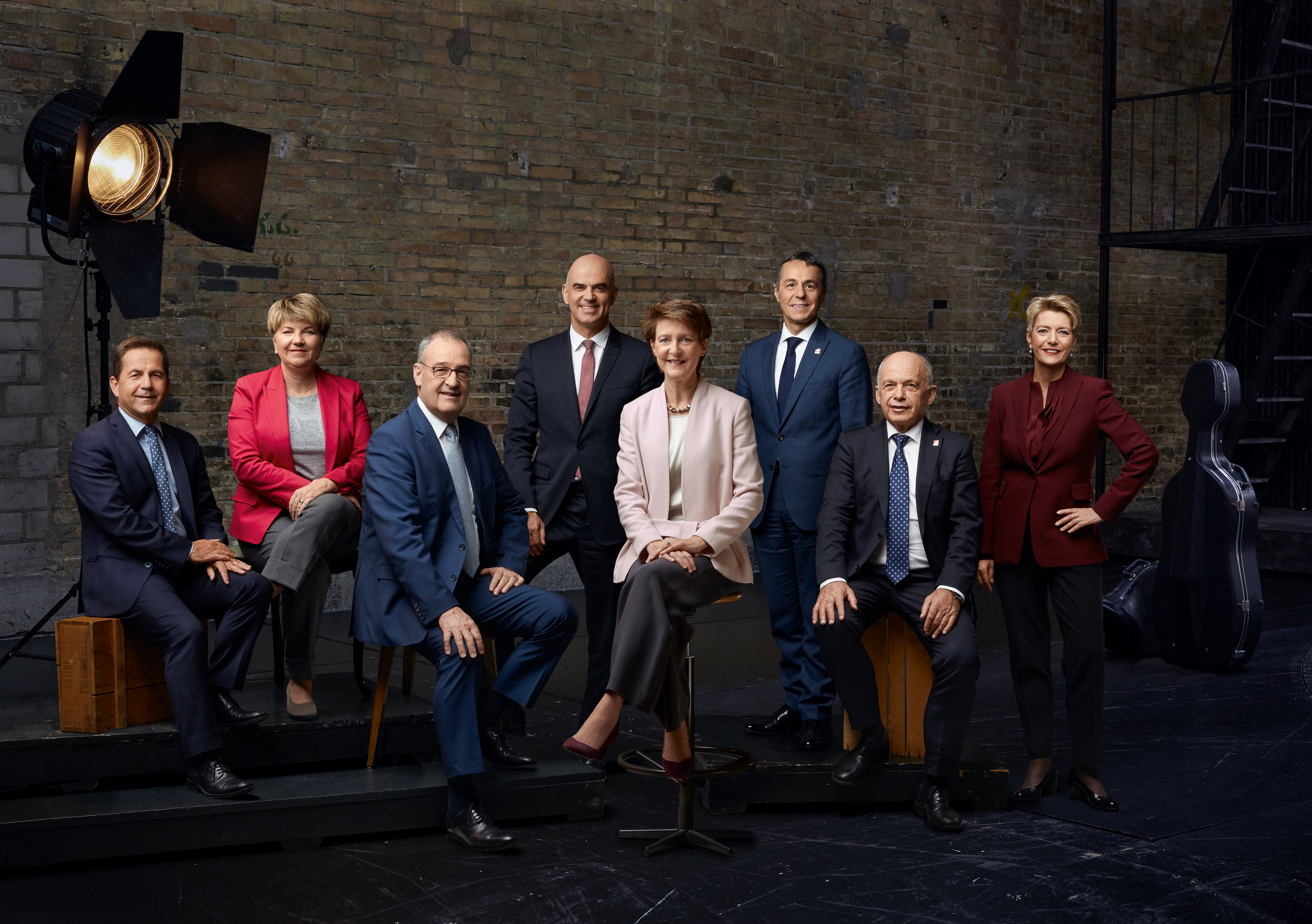
The official photograph of the Swiss Federal Council for 2020. From left to right: Federal Chancellor Walter Thurnherr, Viola Amherd, Guy Parmelin (Vice President for 2020), Alain Berset, Simonetta Sommaruga (President for 2020), Ignazio Cassis, Ueli Maurer and Karin Keller-Sutter.

=== Seat held by Ueli Maurer ===
Ueli Maurer (SVP-ZH) was reelected in the first round of voting.

| Candidate | Party | Round 1 |
|---|---|---|
| Ueli Maurer | SVP | 213 |
| Others | | 8 |
| Valid votes | | 221 |
| Absolute majority | | 111 |
| Invalid votes | | 0 |
| Blank votes | | 23 |
| Votes cast | | 244 |

=== Seat held by Simonetta Sommaruga ===
Simonetta Sommaruga (SP-BE) was reelected in the first round of voting.

| Candidate | Party | Round 1 |
|---|---|---|
| Simonetta Sommaruga | SP | 192 |
| Regula Rytz | GPS | 13 |
| Others | | 13 |
| Valid votes | | 218 |
| Absolute majority | | 110 |
| Invalid votes | | 1 |
| Blank votes | | 25 |
| Votes cast | | 244 |

=== Seat held by Alain Berset ===
Alain Berset (PS-FR) was reelected in the first round of voting.

| Candidate | Party | Round 1 |
|---|---|---|
| Alain Berset | SP | 214 |
| Others | | 16 |
| Valid votes | | 230 |
| Absolute majority | | 116 |
| Invalid votes | | 0 |
| Blank votes | | 14 |
| Votes cast | | 244 |

=== Seat held by Guy Parmelin ===
Guy Parmelin (SVP-VD) was reelected in the first round of voting.

| Candidate | Party | Round 1 |
|---|---|---|
| Guy Parmelin | SVP | 191 |
| Others | | 13 |
| Valid votes | | 204 |
| Absolute majority | | 103 |
| Invalid votes | | 1 |
| Blank votes | | 39 |
| Votes cast | | 244 |

=== Seat held by Ignazio Cassis ===
Ignazio Cassis (FDP-TI) was reelected in the first round of voting. The Greens and Socialists considered FDP.The Liberals to no longer deserve a seat in the Federal Council and fielded Green Party leader Regula Rytz to challenge his seat. Her candidacy mobilized the green and social-democratic groups almost unanimously, but failed to appeal to the centrist parties and Ignazio Cassis was re-elected without being challenged to a runoff.

| Candidate | Party | Round 1 |
|---|---|---|
| Ignazio Cassis | FDP | 145 |
| Regula Rytz | GPS | 82 |
| Others | | 11 |
| Valid votes | | 238 |
| Absolute majority | | 120 |
| Invalid votes | | 0 |
| Blank votes | | 6 |
| Votes cast | | 244 |

=== Seat held by Viola Amherd ===
Viola Amherd (CVP-VS) was reelected in the first round of voting.

| Candidate | Party | Round 1 |
|---|---|---|
| Viola Amherd | CVP | 218 |
| Others | | 14 |
| Valid votes | | 232 |
| Absolute majority | | 117 |
| Invalid votes | | 0 |
| Blank votes | | 11 |
| Votes cast | | 243 |

=== Seat held by Karin Keller-Sutter ===
Karin Keller-Sutter (FDP-SG) was reelected in the first round of voting.

| Candidate | Party | Round 1 |
|---|---|---|
| Karin Keller-Sutter | FDP | 169 |
| Marcel Dobler | FDP | 21 |
| Others | | 16 |
| Valid votes | | 206 |
| Absolute majority | | 104 |
| Invalid votes | | 1 |
| Blank votes | | 37 |
| Votes cast | | 244 |

=== Additional votes ===
==== Chancellor of the Confederation ====
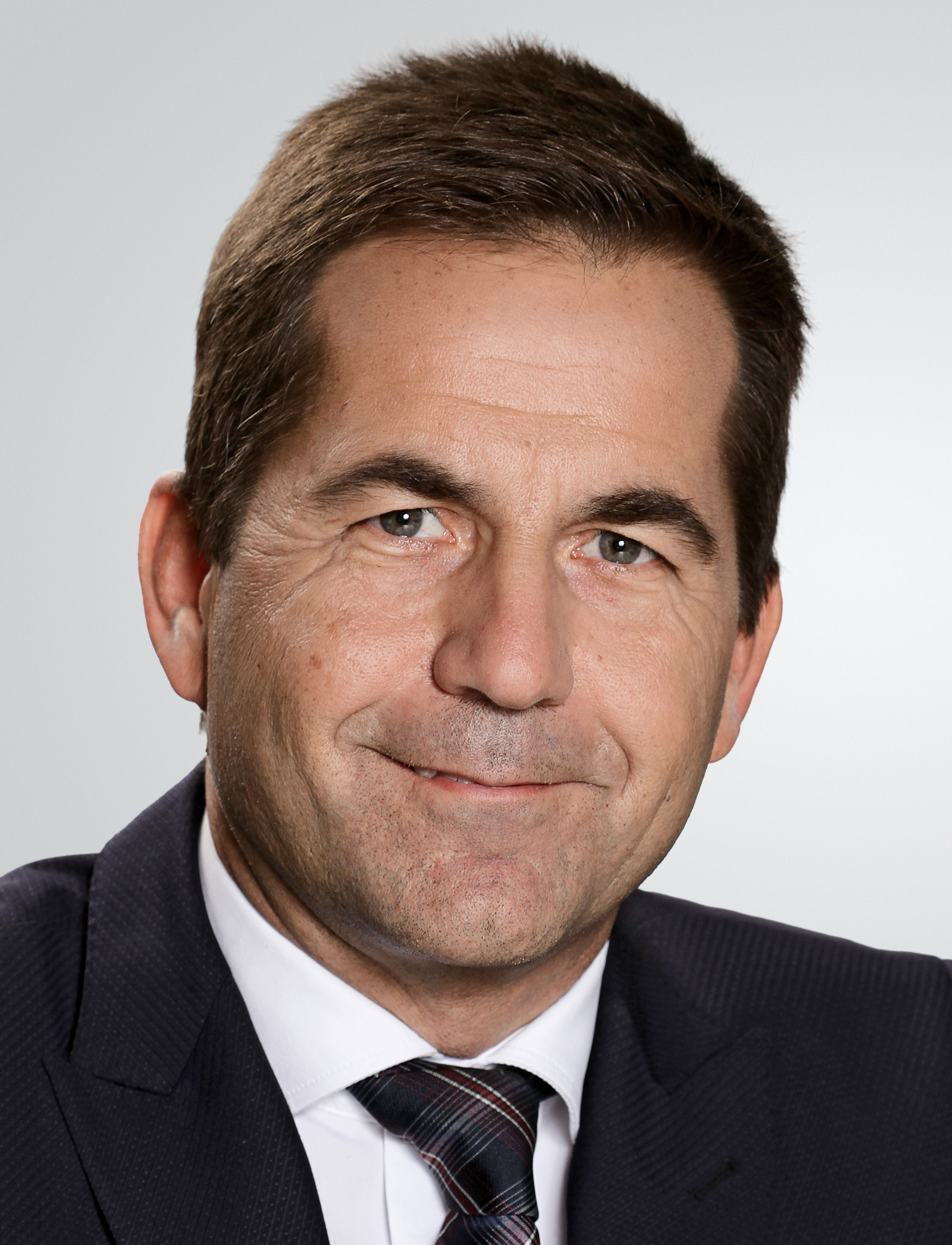
Chancellor Walter Thurnherr

The Chancellor of the Confederation is a technocratic position and not a voting member of the Federal Council, but they are elected after the seven ministers using the same rules. Walter Thurnherr (CVP-AG) was reelected chancellor in the first round of voting, with a majority higher than the ministers.

| Candidate | Party | Round 1 |
|---|---|---|
| Walter Thurnherr | CVP | 219 |
| Others | | 5 |
| Valid votes | | 224 |
| Absolute majority | | 113 |
| Invalid votes | | 3 |
| Blank votes | | 14 |
| Votes cast | | 241 |

==== President of the Confederation ====
2019 Swiss presidential election
| ← 2018 | 11 December 2019 | 2020 → |
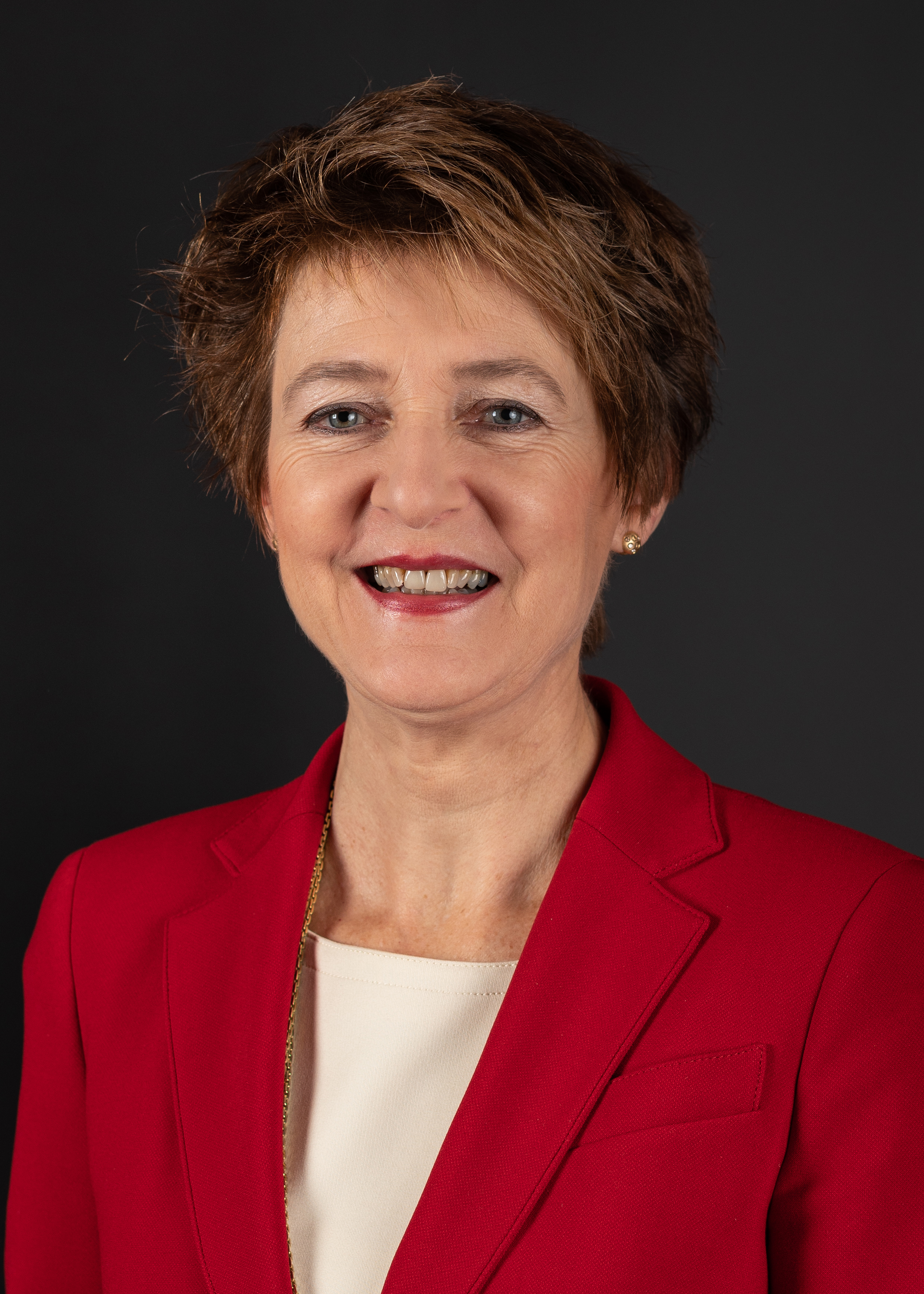
| Candidate | Simonetta Sommaruga |
| Party | Social Democrats |
| Electoral vote | 186 / 200 |
President before election
Ueli Maurer
Elected President
Simonetta Sommaruga

The President of the Confederation is a member of the Federal Council elected every year, with no additional powers apart from chairing meetings of the Federal Council. Simonetta Sommaruga (SP-BE) was supported by all groups, as she had served the longest on the Federal Council since her last presidency in 2015 and was vice-president the previous year.

| Candidate | Party | Round 1 |
|---|---|---|
| Simonetta Sommaruga | SP | 186 |
| Others | | 14 |
| Valid votes | | 200 |
| Absolute majority | | 101 |
| Invalid votes | | 6 |
| Blank votes | | 37 |
| Votes cast | | 243 |

==== Vice President of the Federal Council ====
The Vice President of the Federal Council is a member of the Federal Council elected every year like the President, and the presumptive president for the next year. Guy Parmelin (SVP-VD) was supported by all groups, as he had served the longest on the Federal Council since 2016 without being president.

| Candidate | Party | Round 1 |
|---|---|---|
| Guy Parmelin | SVP | 168 |
| Others | | 15 |
| Valid votes | | 183 |
| Absolute majority | | 92 |
| Invalid votes | | 3 |
| Blank votes | | 52 |
| Votes cast | | 238 |
