= Hans Wicki =

Swiss politician

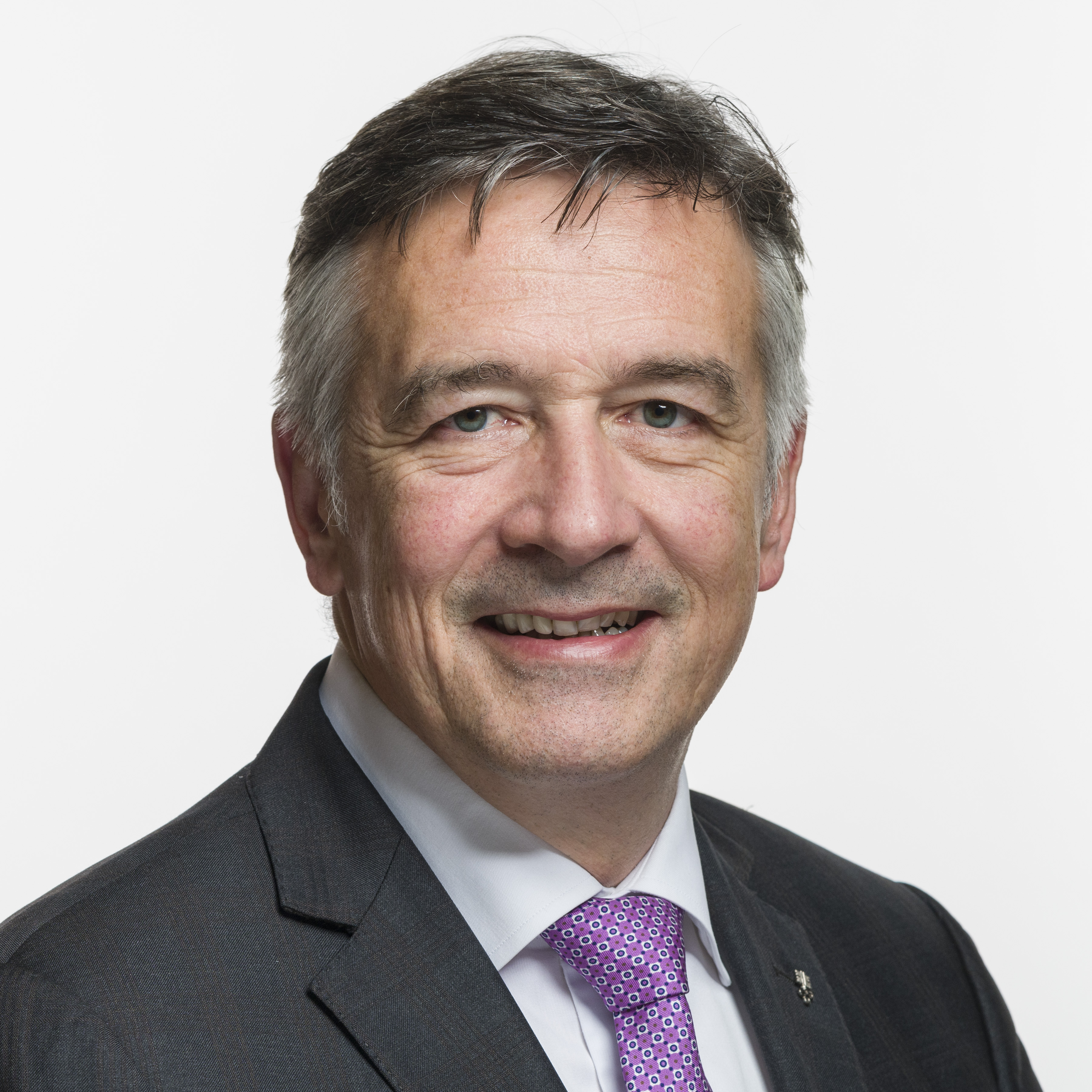
- 2019

Member of the Council of States of Switzerland
- Incumbent
- Assumed office 30 November 2015

Personal details
- Born: 30 May 1962 (age 63) Lucerne, Switzerland

Hans Wicki (born 30 May 1962 in Lucerne) is a Swiss politician who is a member of the Council of States of Switzerland.

== Biography ==
Wicki was elected in 2015.
