= Swiss Alliance of Consumer Organisations =

Umbrella organisation of three Swiss consumer organisations

- (in German) Allianz der Konsumentenschutz-Organisationen (in French) Alliance des organisations de consommateurs (in Italian) Alleanza delle organizzazioni dei consumatori
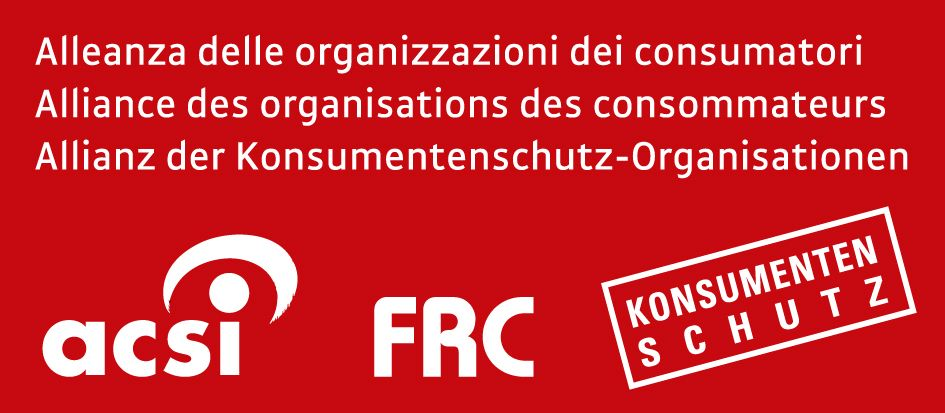
- Formation: 30 June 2010; 16 years ago
- Region served: Switzerland
- Affiliations: Stiftung für Konsumentenschutz; Fédération romande des consommateurs Associazione consumatrici e consumatori della Svizzera italiana

The Swiss Alliance of Consumer Organisations, founded in 2010, is the umbrella organisation of the three Swiss consumer organisations:

- Stiftung für Konsumentenschutz (SKS, founded in 1964) of German-speaking Switzerland;
- Fédération romande des consommateurs (FRC, founded in 1959) of French-speaking Switzerland;
- Associazione consumatrici e consumatori della Svizzera italiana (ACSI, founded in 1975) of Italian-speaking Switzerland.

== History ==
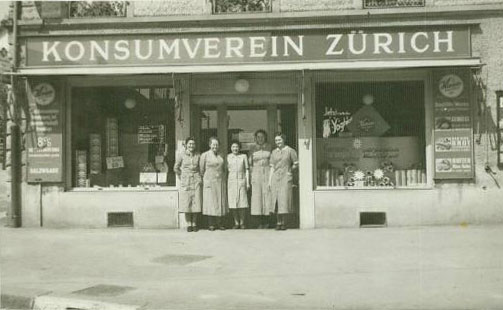
Konsumverein Zürich, 19th century

The earliest efforts for consumer protection in Switzerland emerged in the 19th century, with organisations such as the Konsumverein Zürich (founded in 1851), the first of a number of consumers' co-operatives. Several of these formed the Verband Schweizerischer Konsumvereine (VSK, "Federation of Swiss Consumers' Co-operatives") in 1890. The VSK was renamed Coop in 1969. In post-war Switzerland, especially housewives were confronted with an explosion of new consumer goods choices, and they started to form their organisations to test products for safety and reliability. In 1959, the French-speaking Commission romande des consommatrices (Romand Commission of Female Consumers", today the Fédération romande des consommateurs, FRC) was founded, followed in 1961 by the German- and Italian-speaking women's associations who formed the Konsumentinnenforum ("Female Consumers' Forum") in 1961, today known as the Konsumentenforum (kf, "Consumers' Forum"). In 1975 the Associazione Consumatrici della Svizzera italiana (ACSI, "Association of Female Consumers of Italian Switzerland") was formed in the canton of Ticino. All these consumer organisations were dominated and led by women, and thus some male consumers felt unrepresented. Moreover, the existing tended to focus on cooperation with the providers instead of solely advocating the rights of consumers. This led to the 18 June 1964 foundation of the Stiftung für Konsumentenschutz ("Consumer Protection Foundation"), dominated by men and aimed at improving consumer law, opposing discrimination and testing products.

Later the gender-based organisations merged by language group; the three major language-based federations finally formed the Alliance of Consumer Organisations in 2010.

== See also ==
- Simonetta Sommaruga
