= 2022 Swiss Federal Council election =

Governmental by-election, 7 December 2022

2022 Swiss Federal Council by-elections
- 7 December 2022

2 of the 7 Federal Councillors
- Maurer's seat
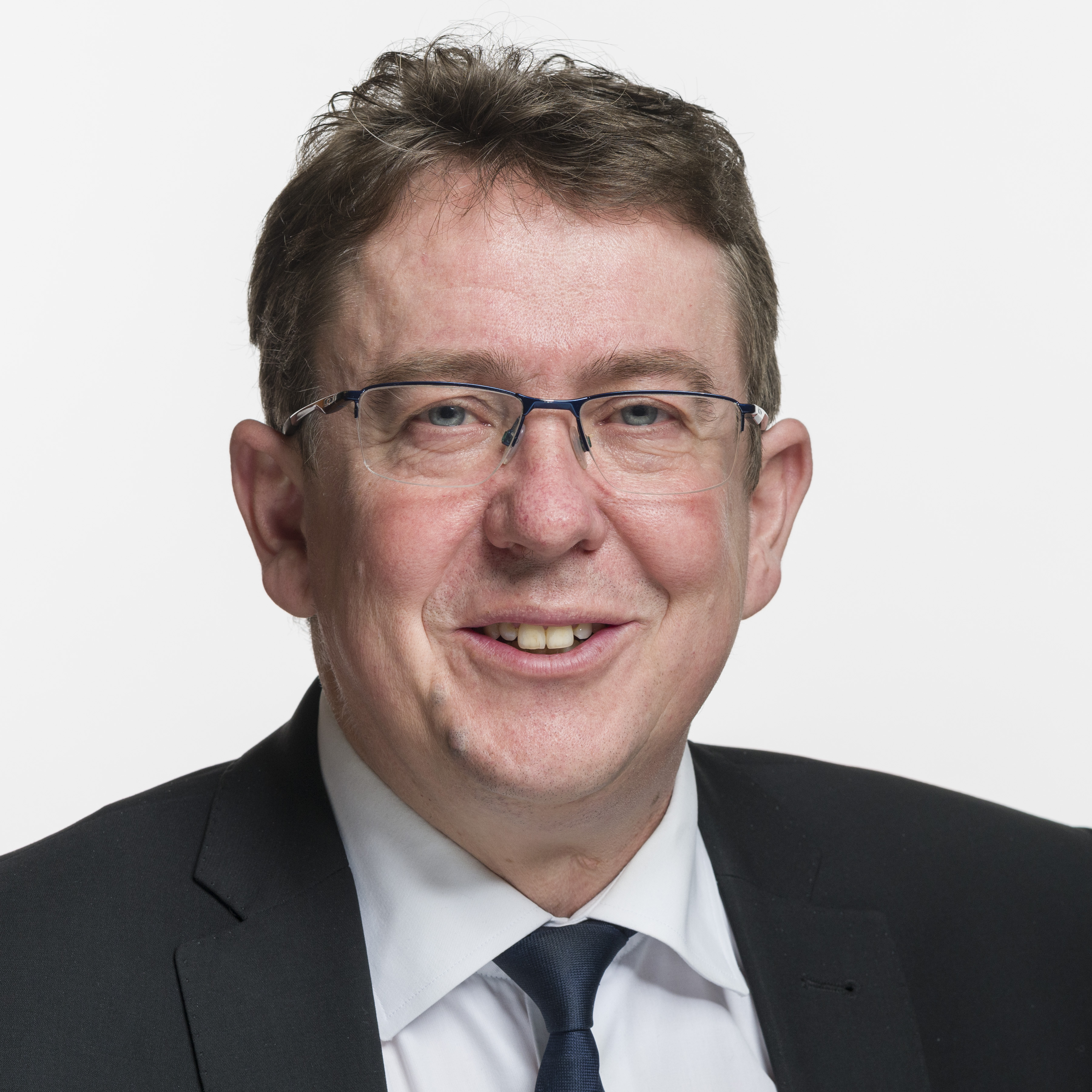

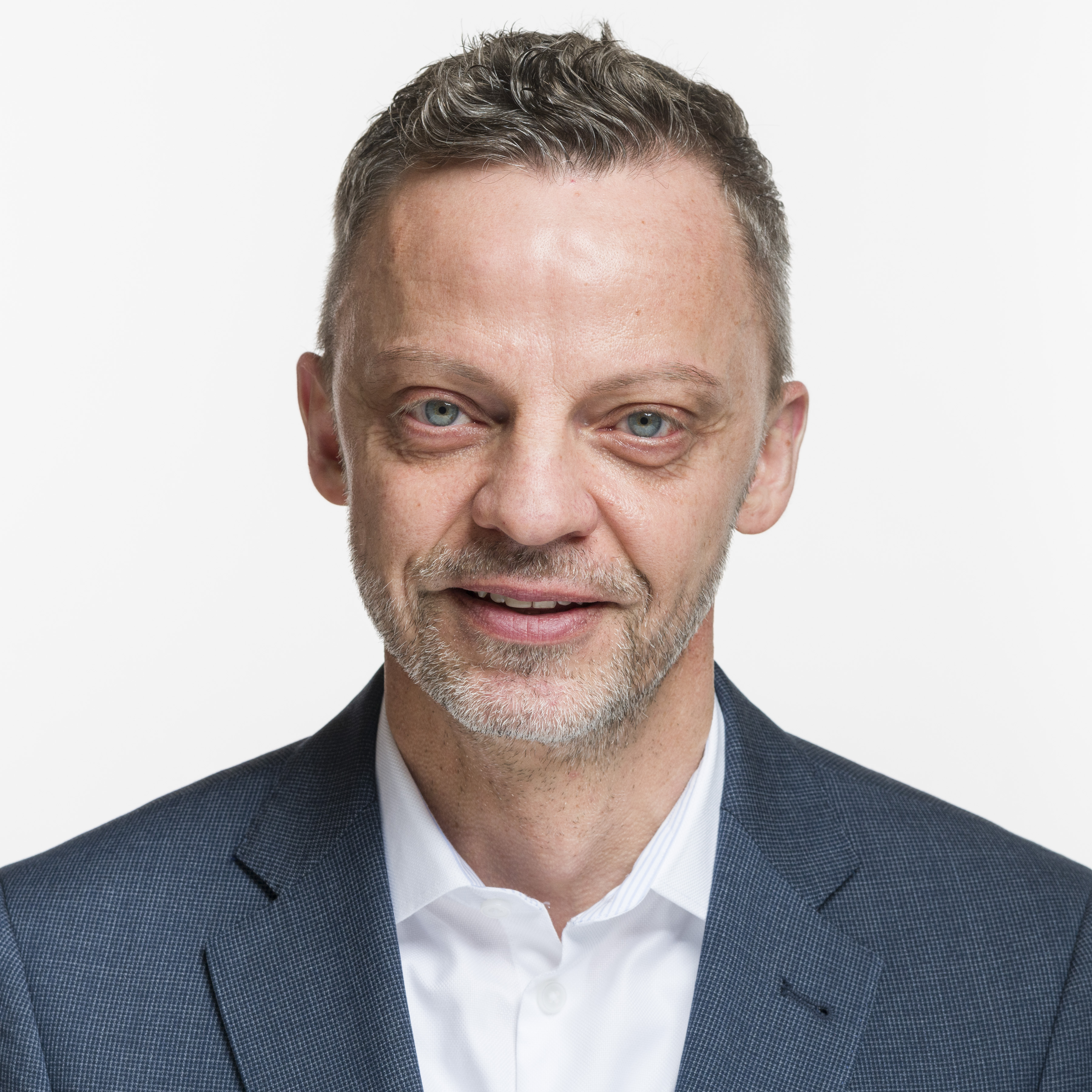
Candidate	Albert Rösti	Hans-Ueli Vogt
Party	Swiss People's	Swiss People's
Electoral vote	131	98
- Sommaruga's seat
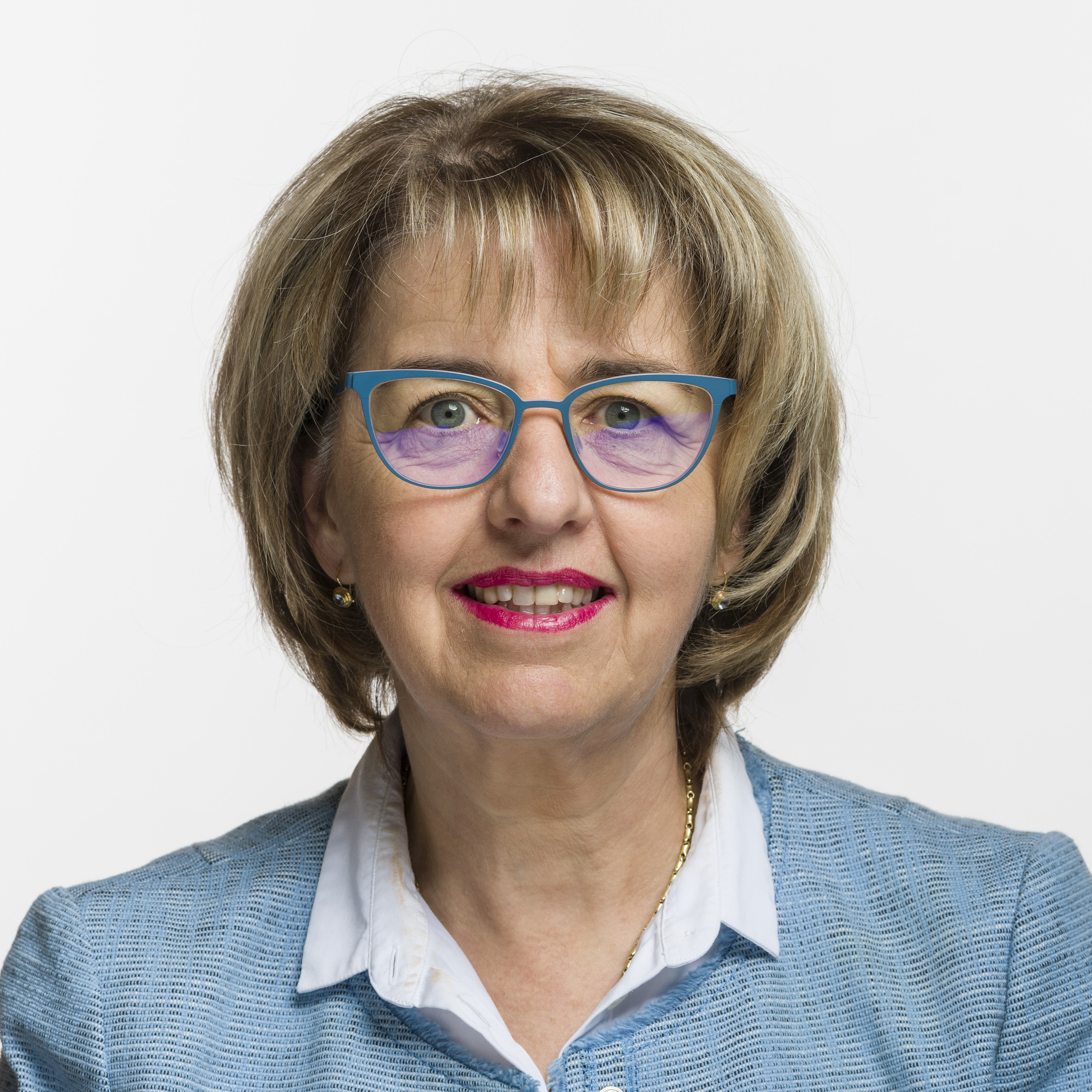

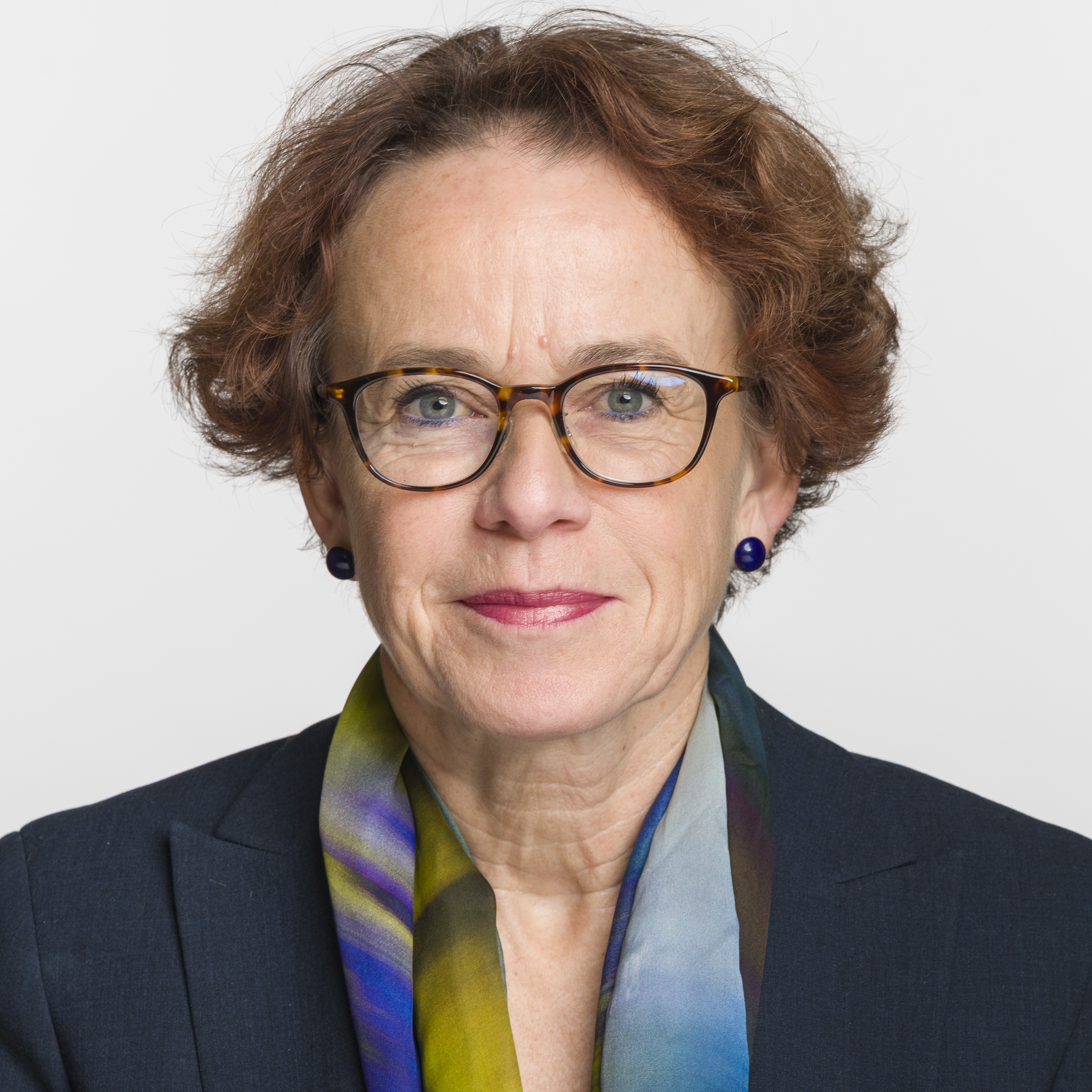

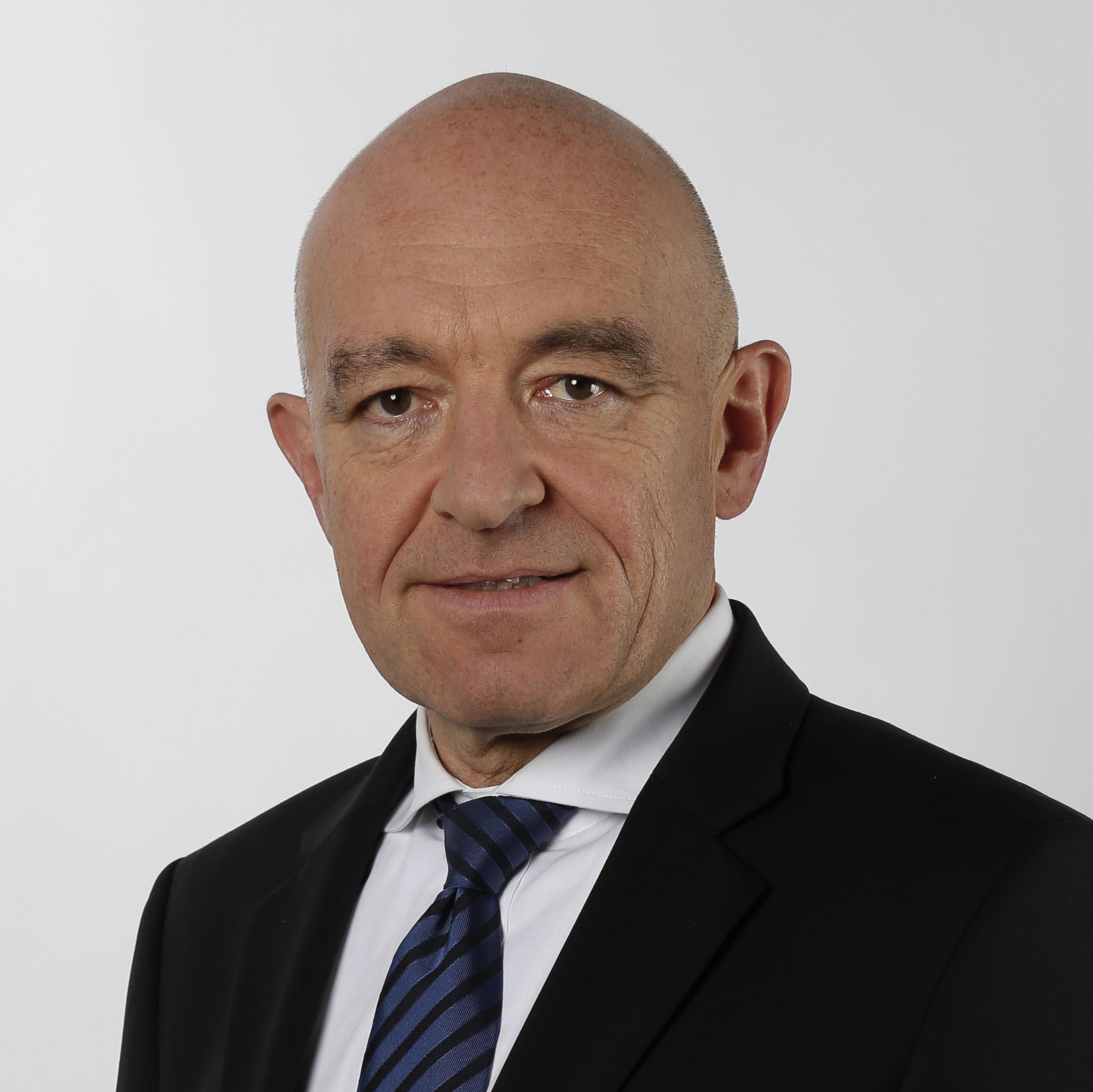
Candidate	Élisabeth Baume-Schneider	Eva Herzog	Daniel Jositsch
Party	Social Democrats	Social Democrats	Social Democrats
1st round	96	83	58
2nd round	112	105	28
3rd round	123	116	6

By-elections to the Swiss Federal Council were held on 7 December 2022, after federal councillors Ueli Maurer (SVP-ZH) and Simonetta Sommaruga (SP-BE) announced they would leave the Council effective 31 December of the same year. The parliament elected Albert Rösti and Élisabeth Baume-Schneider respectively to replace them.

Per an informal agreement between the political parties known as the magic formula, only SVP candidates stood for Maurer's seat and only SP candidates stood for Sommaruga's, ensuring the partisan balance would be retained. However, this election was characterized as an "upset" in the language balance as German-speaking councillors became a minority in the Council for the first time since 1919 as a result of Baume-Schneider's election; a regional imbalance between cities and rural areas was also noticed, while the gender balance remained identical. This election is the first time the canton of Jura is represented to the Federal Council, being the youngest canton in the confederation.

Alain Berset was elected President of the Swiss Confederation for the year 2023, as expected following the informal rotation agreement, but with a narrower margin than usual.

== Background ==
In Switzerland, the 7-seat executive Federal Council is elected by the Federal Assembly (both chambers of the legislature sitting together); in practice it is apportioned between the parties following the unwritten agreement known as the "magic formula". The formula was followed from 1959 to 2007, and again since 2015. Since 2016 the composition has been: SVP 2 seats, SP 2 seats, FDP 2 seats, and Die Mitte 1 seat.

Federal councillors are traditionally re-elected until they step down; only four ever lost re-election. Councillors tend to stand down during their term in order to ensure their party retains their seat and to allow their party to get more visibility at a moment other than shortly after a general election. These by-elections were held only ten months before the 2023 federal election.

On 30 September 2022, SVP councillor Ueli Maurer (elected to the council in 2008) announced he would resign effective 31 December, after serving for 13 years. On 2 November, SP councillor Simonetta Sommaruga (elected to the council in 2010) announced her departure as well after her husband suffered a stroke. Following the existing precedent, only SVP candidates stood for Maurer's seat and only SP candidates stood for Sommaruga's seat.

There was speculation about which departments of the Federal administration would be attributed to whom after the election. For the first time, Alain Berset (PS-FR) will rank highest in seniority after heading Home Affairs for ten years; the departments left open by the resignations of Maurer and Sommaruga were Finance and of Environment, Transport, Energy and Communications.

=== Electoral system ===
The seats are elected using an absolute majority with an exhaustive ballot, each seat being filled independently. In the first two rounds members of the Federal Assembly can vote for anyone eligible, but only those receiving at least ten votes are announced in the results; from the third round onwards only candidates who received at least ten votes in one of the first two rounds are eligible, the last-placed candidate is eliminated until someone reaches an overall majority.

After the elections, the Council meets to attribute the departments of the Federal administration to each councillor. The departments are attributed by a council decision; in practice, each member announces their preference in order of seniority leaving the newly-elected members last, and the council adopts their preferences. In 2018, as Viola Amherd and Karin Keller-Sutter were elected on the same day, the council chose to let Keller-Sutter choose earlier despite having been elected slightly later.

== Candidates ==
=== Maurer's seat ===
The vacancy opened the question of whether the SVP would field a woman on their ticket for the first time (Eveline Widmer-Schlumpf had been elected in 2007 but was not the party's official candidate). One of the anticipated potential candidates, Magdalena Martullo-Blocher (daughter of Christoph Blocher) announced on the same day she would not run.

The Green Party envisioned standing a candidate as well, citing their absence from the magic formula despite their popular support and the SVP's "flouting of collegiality" in the Council, but ultimately did not run.

The SVP selected two candidates, both from German Switzerland and from the two most-populated cantons:

- Albert Rösti (SVP-BE), National councillor for Bern (2011–) and former president of the Swiss People's Party (2016–2020)
- Hans-Ueli Vogt (SVP-ZH), Former national councillor for Zürich (2015–2021)
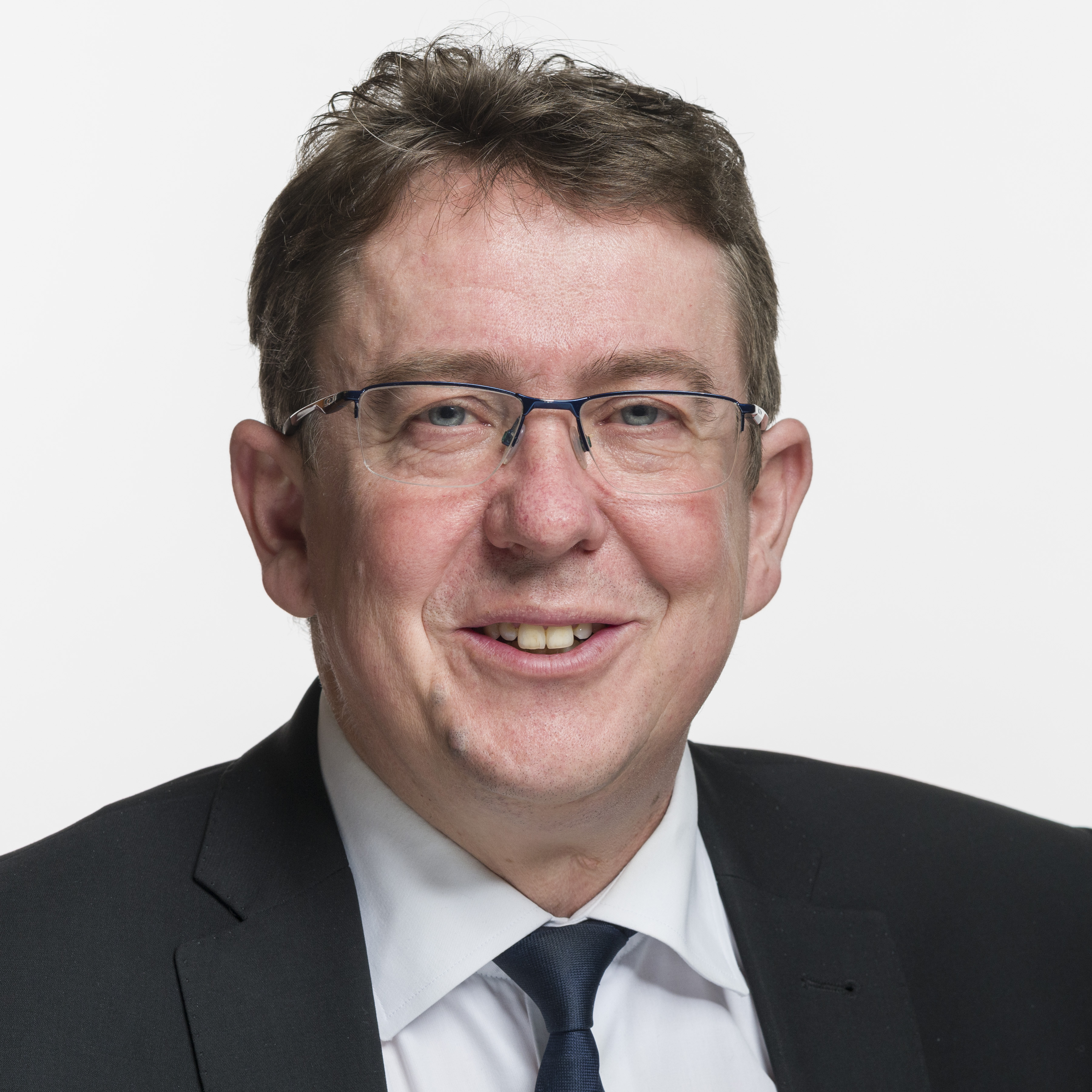
National Councillor
Albert Rösti
from Bern

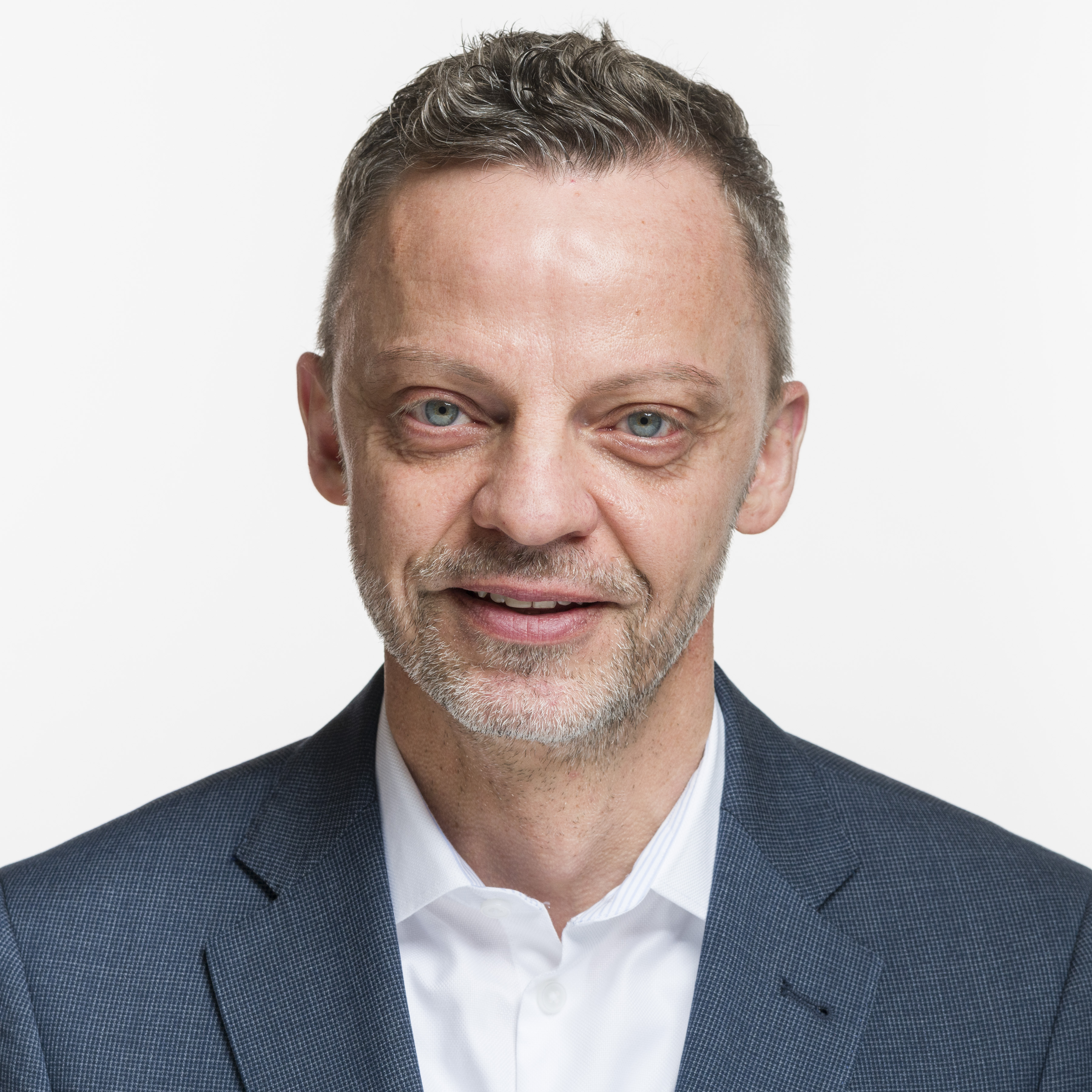
Former National Councillor
Hans-Ueli Vogt
from Zürich

Both candidates were interviewed by the other parties; the green liberals emphasized the question of collegiality while both the FDP and the Greens left it as an open vote for their members. Rösti won the support of the important peasant group in the parliament, is seen as a more traditional candidate for the party and was its president for five years, and is also well-known as a lobbyist, especially in oil as he was president of Swissoil a few months before the election. Vogt distinguished himself on being a more urban figure and surprising candidate for the SVP while being more independent from lobbies, hard-line on national sovereignty, and if elected would have been the first openly homosexual member of the Federal Council. No party endorsed either candidate, leaving it a free vote for their members.

States Councillor for Bern Werner Salzmann declared his candidacy but was ultimately not nominated by the SVP party after being narrowly defeated by Vogt.

=== Sommaruga's seat ===
The SP fielded two candidates, both women in the Council of States who had long experience with the executive in their respective cantons:

- Élisabeth Baume-Schneider (SP-JU), States Councillor for Jura (2015–) and former Jura executive councillor (2003–2015)
- Eva Herzog (SP-BS), States Councillor for Basel-Stadt (2019–) and former Basel-Stadt executive councillor (2005–2020)

A third person received nearly sixty first-round votes despite not being nominated as candidate:

- Daniel Jositsch (SP-ZH), States Councillor for Zürich (2015–) and former National councillor for Zürich (2007–2015)
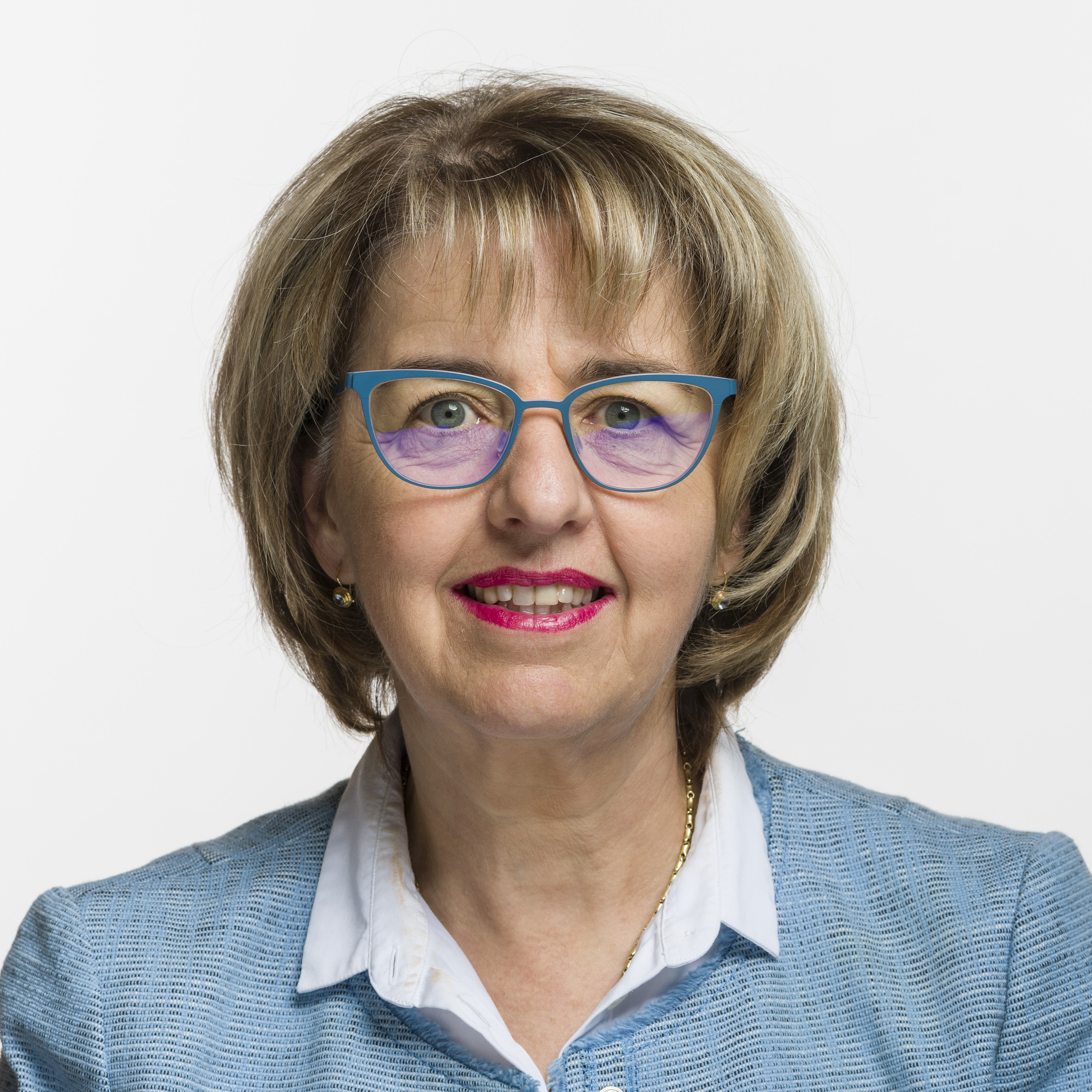
States Councillor
Élisabeth Baume-Schneider
from Jura

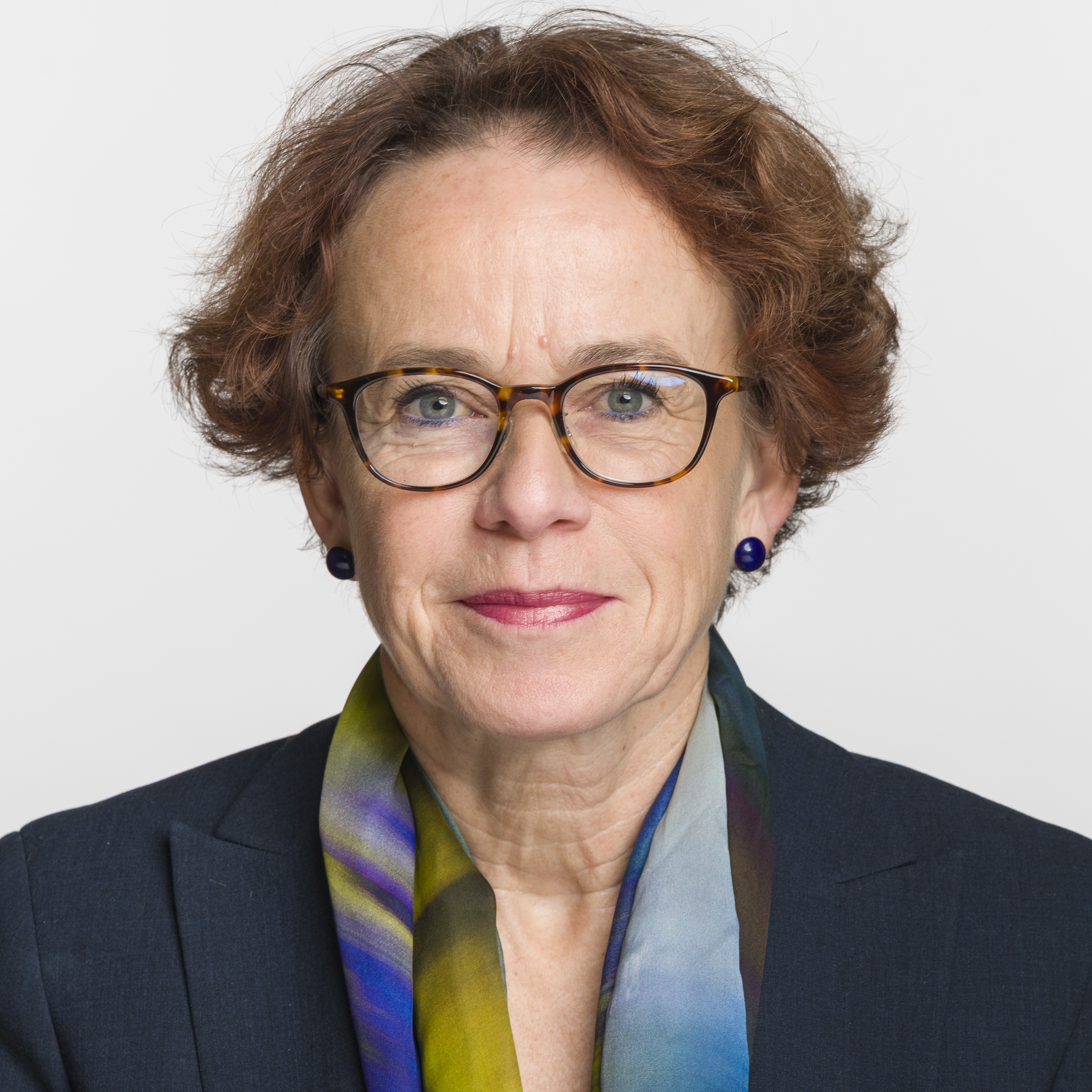
States Councillor
Eva Herzog
from Basel-Stadt

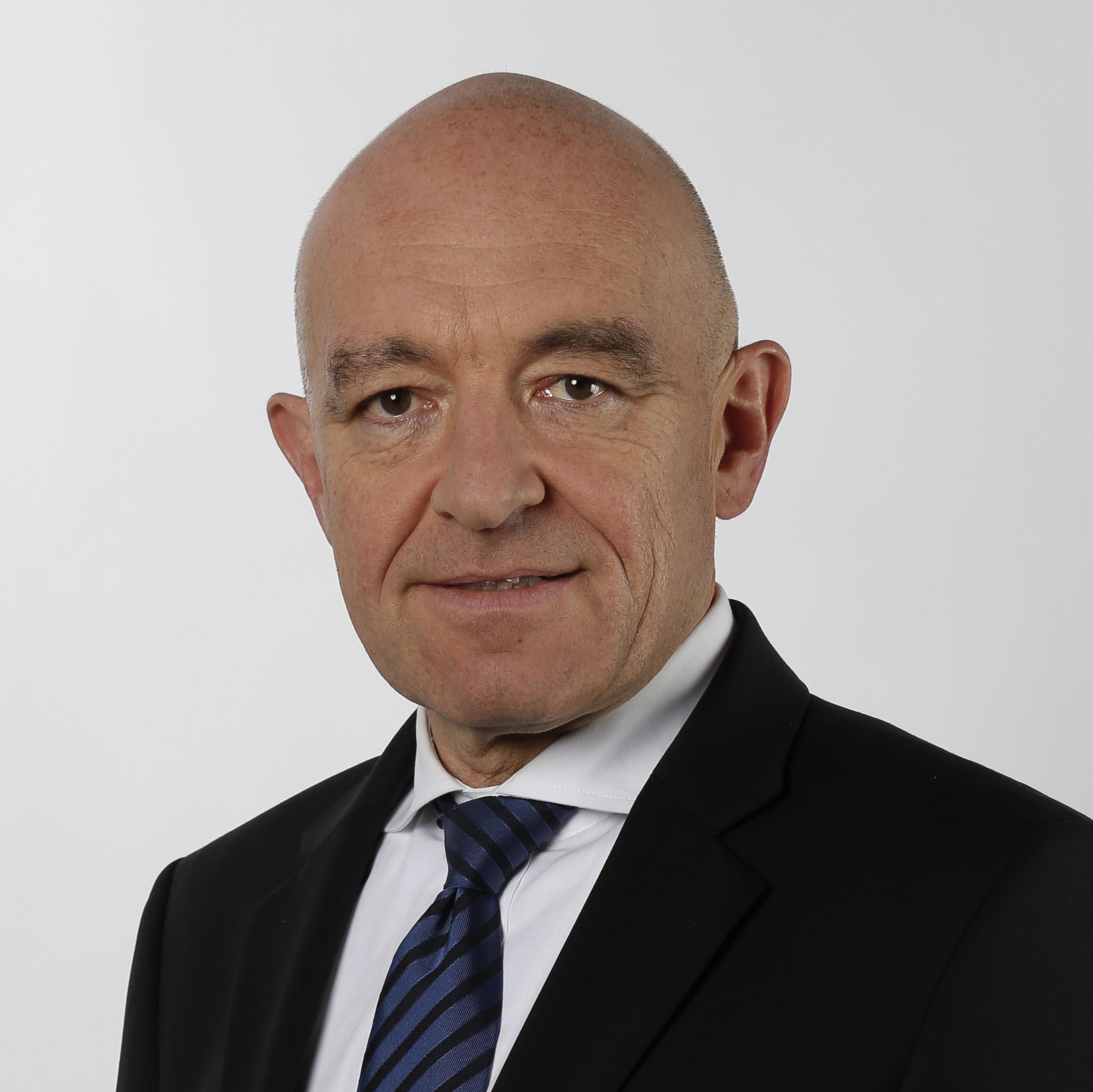
States Councillor
Daniel Jositsch
from Zürich

Herzog was initially seen as front-runner due to her previous experience in managing her canton's finances, as well as having already been candidate for the Council in the 2010 election (losing to Sommaruga) She had also been re-elected by wide margins several times in her canton, which was historically under-represented compared to the others. She also benefited from being German, as Baume-Schneider's election would put the German speakers in minority in the Council, and quickly gained support from the FDP for this reason as well as being from the more liberal wing of the social-democrats. The Green-liberal party endorsed her citing her economic management and her positions on the EU, but all other parties left it an open vote for their members.

Baume-Schneider represented a more left-wing side of the social-democrats, but she gained support within the other "bourgeois parties" (SVP and Die Mitte) after her interview by the important peasant group in the parliament and from her rural background; she also benefited from a warmer image compared to "glacial" Herzog. Despite being from a French-speaking canton and her election risking disturbing the language balance in the Council, her candidacy benefited from her knowledge of Swiss German and the fact she would be the first federal councillor from Jura (the youngest canton, created in 1979).

Baume-Schneider and Herzog were both narrowly selected over Bern executive councillor Evi Allemann; State councillor for Zürich Daniel Jositsch, despite not being nominated, received nearly sixty votes in protest due to the all-women ticket presented by the SP. The candidacy of Jositsch became an issue as the SP presidency preferred an all women ticket as a man of the SP already sits in the Federal Council and the SP considers itself as the party of gender equality. The national councilor Franziska Roth of Solothurn argued that all politicians were allowed to present themselves as candidates in a democratic party, while Hans Stöckli, a fellow MP of Jositsch from Zürich deemed it clear that a second seat for the SP should be reserved for a woman.

== Results ==
=== Seat vacated by Ueli Maurer ===
Albert Rösti was elected to the Federal Council in the first round, with a thirty-three-vote margin over Hans-Ueli Vogt, this marked the first time since 1979 that an SVP candidate was elected in the first round.

Candidate	Party	Round 1
Albert Rösti	SVP	131
Hans-Ueli Vogt	SVP	98
Others		14
Valid votes		243
Absolute majority		122
Invalid votes		0
Blank votes		2
Votes cast		245

=== Seat vacated by Simonetta Sommaruga ===
Élisabeth Baume-Schneider was elected, narrowly defeating Eva Herzog in the third round by reaching the overall majority. Daniel Jositsch received nearly sixty votes in the first, speculated to be from right-wing legislators in protest for the SP's all-female ticket.

She received the fewest votes for the election of an SP councillor since 1943; after Jositsch's strong showing in the first round, social-democrats leader Roger Nordmann emphasized in a parliamentary speech the historical and current gender imbalance in the federal council, calling again to vote for one of the two nominated candidates.

Candidate	Party	Round 1	Round 2	Round 3
Élisabeth Baume-Schneider	SP	96	112	123
Eva Herzog	SP	83	105	116
Daniel Jositsch	SP	58	28	6
Others		6	0	0
Valid votes		243	245	245
Absolute majority		122	123	123
Invalid votes		0	0	0
Blank votes		0	0	0
Votes cast		243	245	245

== Presidential and vice-presidential selection ==
Alain Berset and Viola Amherd were as expected selected, respectively, president and vice-president for the year 2023, shortly after the election of the new federal councillors. A week earlier, on 28 November, Martin Candinas and Brigitte Häberli-Koller had also been elected, respectively, presidents of the National Council and Council of States.

=== President of the Confederation ===
2022 Swiss presidential election
- 7 December 2022
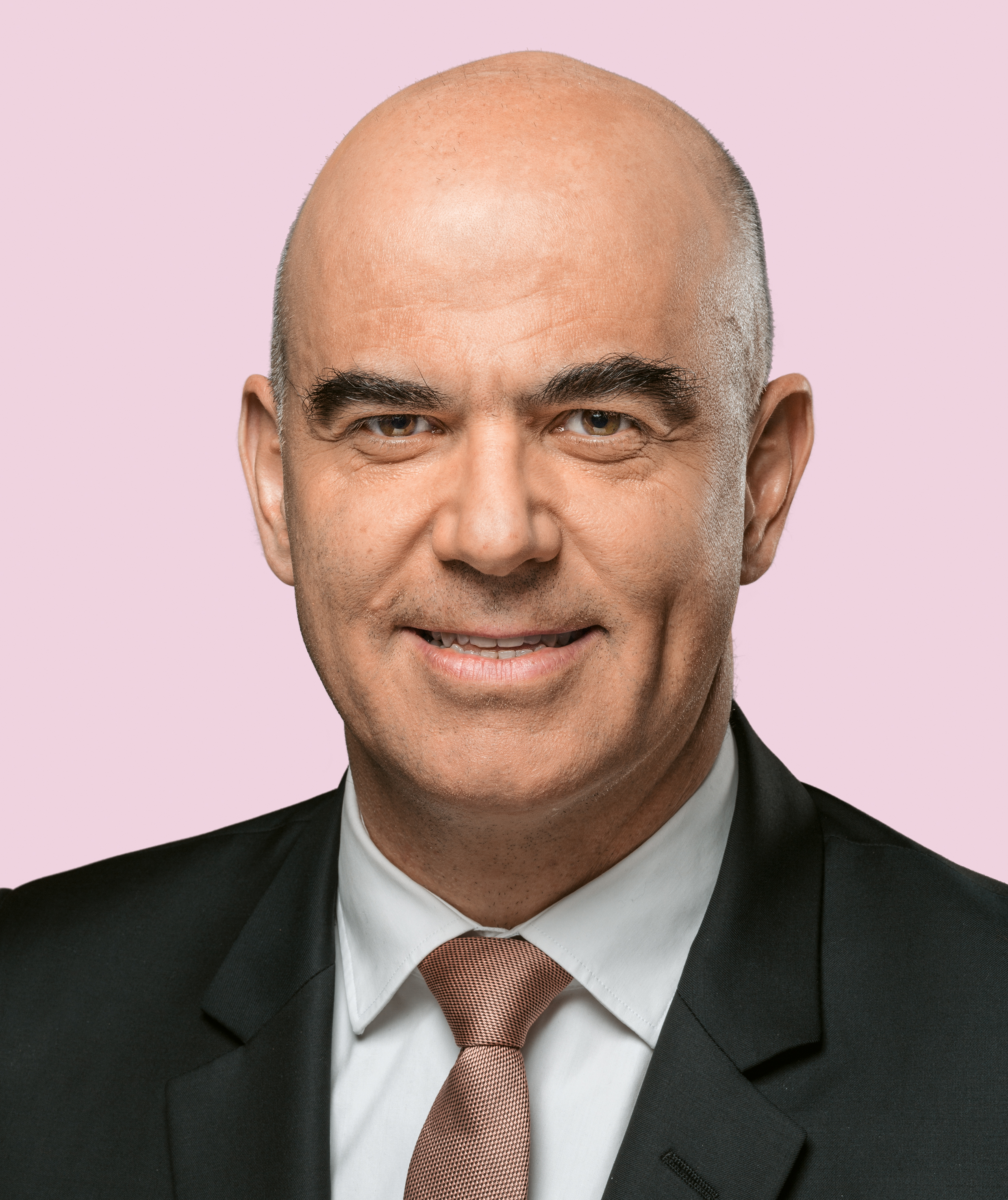
Candidate	Alain Berset
Party	Social Democrats
Electoral vote	140 / 181
President before election
Ignazio Cassis
Elected President
Alain Berset

The President of the Confederation is a member of the Federal Council elected every year, with no additional powers apart from chairing meetings of the Federal Council. Alain Berset (SP-FR) was supported by all groups, as he had served the longest on the Federal Council since being last president in 2018 and was vice-president the previous year; he however only received 140 votes which is the lowest for an elected president since 2011 and fifty fewer votes than his previous selection in 2017.

Candidate	Party	Round 1
Alain Berset	SP	140
Viola Amherd	DM	16
Karin Keller-Sutter	FDP	10
Others		15
Valid votes		181
Absolute majority		91
Invalid votes		5
Blank votes		46
Votes cast		232

=== Vice-President of the Federal Council ===
The Vice President of the Federal Council is a member of the Federal Council elected every year like the President, and the presumptive president for the next year. Viola Amherd (DM-VS) was supported by all groups, as she had served the longest on the Federal Council since her election in 2017 without being president.

Candidate	Party	Round 1
Viola Amherd	DM	207
Others		16
Valid votes		223
Absolute majority		112
Invalid votes		3
Blank votes		13
Votes cast		239

=== Presidents of the National Council and of the Council of States ===
Martin Candinas (DM-GR) was comfortably elected as president of the National Council for the year, succeeding Irène Kälin. He is one of only three Romansh-speaking members of the federal assembly, and later presided over the election of the two federal councillors in Romansh, to highlight Swiss tetra-lingualism.

Brigitte Häberli-Koller (DM-TG) was near-unanimously elected as president of the Council of States for the year, succeeding to Thomas Hefti.

Candidate	Party	Round 1
Martin Candinas	DM	181
Others		7
Valid votes		188
Absolute majority		95
Invalid votes		0
Blank votes		0
Votes cast		188

Candidate	Party	Round 1
Brigitte Häberli-Koller	DM	45
Valid votes		45
Absolute majority		23
Invalid votes		0
Blank votes		1
Votes cast		46

== Reactions ==
Baume-Schneider's election as the first Jurassian federal councillor was celebrated in her canton and in front of the Federal Palace, as being a wide recognition of the youngest canton's place in the confederation. Both her and Albert Rösti swore the oath of office after their election and will take their seats on 1st January 2023, completing their term by serving for one year before the next regular election.

The partisan and gender balance in the council were both preserved (magic formula for parties, and four men to three women for gender), but this election changed the language balance as German ended up with only three seats in the council, with French and Italian having, respectively, three seats and one seat, thus with a majority of Romance-language councillors for the first time. Newspaper 24 Heures estimated this was "an end to ambitions from Vaud" as Alain Berset's successor is expected to be German-speaking.

The regional balance was affected as well, as six seats represented rural areas or small cities, and both the largest cantons (Zürich and Bern) and three largest cities (Zürich, Bern, and Geneva) became unrepresented. Green-Liberal federal councillor Judith Bellaiche deplored the fact all seven councillors represent cantons with a negative contribution to federal finances.

The FDP characterized this situation as a "temporary unbalance". The German-speaking press largely deplored it, as the German-language newspaper Tages-Anzeiger expects both to be resolved in the regular election in 2023 and called for Alain Berset and Guy Parmelin, from Fribourg and Vaud respectively, to both retire.

=== Federal departments ===
The federal departments were attributed on 8 December. The four most senior councillors retained their respective departments: Alain Berset the Home Affairs, Guy Parmelin the Economic Affairs, Education and Research, Ignazio Cassis the Foreign Affairs, and Viola Amherd the Defence, Civil Protection and Sport; Karin Keller-Sutter picked Maurer's former Federal Department of Finance, leaving the Justice and Police she had since 2018 to Élisabeth Baume-Schneider; Albert Rösti took the Environment, Transport, Energy and Communications left by Sommaruga. Cassis described the sharing as "consensual", while the greens criticized Rösti's new position as head of the environment despite his position as former president of Swiss Oil.

Attribution of the departments of the Federal administration of Switzerland for 2023
Department	Head before	Head after
Foreign Affairs	Ignazio Cassis	
Home Affairs	Alain Berset	
Justice and Police	Karin Keller-Sutter	Élisabeth Baume-Schneider
Defence, Civil Protection and Sport	Viola Amherd	
Finance	Ueli Maurer	Karin Keller-Sutter
Economic Affairs, Education and Research	Guy Parmelin	
Environment, Transport, Energy and Communications	Simonetta Sommaruga	Albert Rösti
