= 2019 Swiss federal election =

← 2015	20 October 2019	2023 →
- National Council
- All 200 seats in the National Council; 101 seats needed for a majority
- Turnout: 45.11% (▼2.51pp)
Party	Leader	Vote %	Seats	+/–
Swiss People's	Albert Rösti	25.59	53	−12
Social Democrats	Christian Levrat	16.84	39	−4
FDP.The Liberals	Petra Gössi	15.11	29	−4
Greens	Regula Rytz	13.24	28	+17
Christian Democrats	Gerhard Pfister	11.38	25	−2
Green Liberals	Jürg Grossen	7.80	16	+9
BDP	Martin Landolt	2.47	3	−4
Evangelical People's	Marianne Streiff	2.08	3	+1
Federal Democrats	Hans Moser	1.05	1	+1
Labour–solidaritéS	Gavriel Pinson	1.05	2	+1
Ticino League	Attilio Bignasca	0.75	1	−1
This lists parties that won seats. See the complete results below.
- Council of States
- All 46 seats in the Council of States; 24 seats needed for a majority
Party	Seats	+/–
Christian Democrats	13	0
FDP.The Liberals	12	−1
Social Democrats	9	−3
Swiss People's	6	+1
Greens	5	+4
Independents	1	0
This lists parties that won seats. See the complete results below.

Federal elections were held in Switzerland on 20 October 2019 to elect all members of both houses of the Federal Assembly. This was followed by the 2019 election to the Swiss Federal Council, the federal executive, by the United Federal Assembly.

In the 20 October elections, the two green parties, the Green Party of Switzerland and the Green Liberal Party of Switzerland, made major electoral gains, taking 13.2% and 7.8% of the vote respectively. As in the previous election, the Swiss People's Party received the most votes, but its share of votes went down to 25.6% from 29.4%.

Initial media coverage interprets the 2019 election results as a "green wave" marking a leftward shift of the Swiss electorate on the political spectrum. It remains to be seen what effect the changes in the relative vote and seat shares will have on the composition of the Federal Council, or at least on the government's agenda and legislative initiatives, if there is no change in party representation in the executive branch.

In contrast to Germany and Austria, the Swiss federal government has for decades been composed of representatives of the four largest parties as a matter of political practice (rather than constitutional design); it has long operated on a consensus-seeking model characterised by accommodation of competing interests and viewpoints, rather than imposition of the will of the majority over the opposition.

Switzerland's confederate structure and frequent initiatives and referendums pose additional constraints on what elected politicians are collectively able to accomplish. For these reasons, the strong electoral gains of the two green parties do not have the same implications for coalition-government formation as they do in Austria following the 29 September 2019 parliamentary elections there, in which the Greens obtained their best results ever with 13.9% of the vote and 26 seats in a slightly smaller lower house of Parliament.

== Date ==
The elections for the National Council took place nationally on 20 October 2019.

The cantons individually organise their elections for the Council of States, which all held on 20 October 2019, with one exception. In Appenzell Innerrhoden the election took place on 28 April at the 2019 Landsgemeinde. Depending on the results of the 20 October election, a second round or runoff election may be required in some cantons.

== Electoral system ==
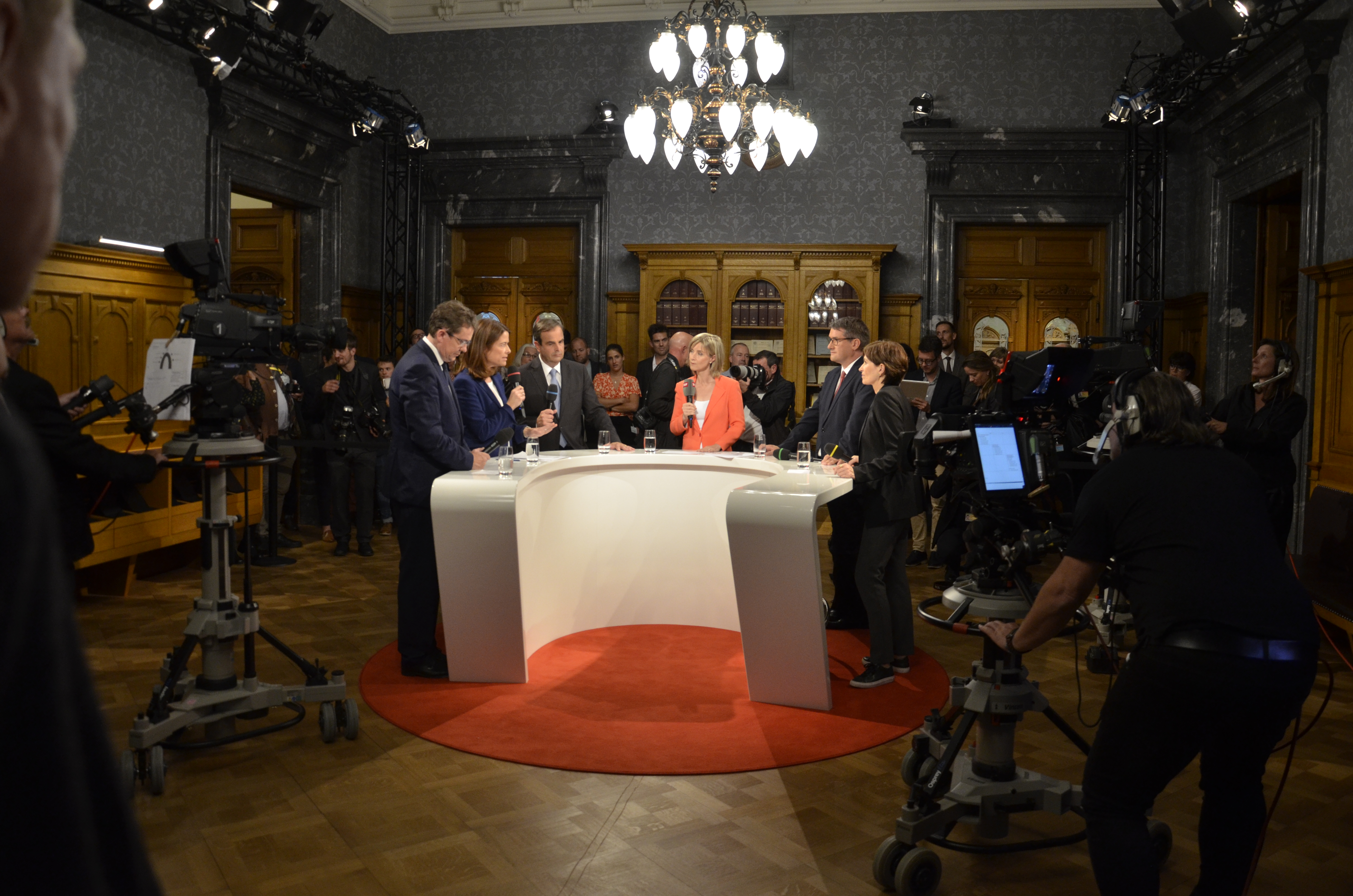
Television interview with the leaders of the five largest parties

The 200 members of the National Council are elected from 26 cantons, each of which constitutes a constituency. The cantons are of unequal population size and use different electoral systems. Six are single-member constituencies in which winners are determined by first-past-the-post voting; the remaining 20 cantons are multi-member constituencies, in which members are elected by open list proportional representation. Voters may cross out names on party lists, split their vote between parties (a system known as panachage), or draw up their own list on a blank ballot. Seats are allocated using the Hagenbach-Bischoff system.

National Council seats are apportioned to the cantons based on their respective population size (which includes children and resident foreigners who do not have the right to vote). Based on the official population count recorded at the end of 2016, Bern and Lucerne each lost a seat while Geneva and Vaud each gained a seat. The least-populous cantons have just one seat in the National Council — in 2019 there are six such cantons, four of which are half-cantons.

The rules regarding who can stand as a candidate and vote in elections to the National Council are uniform across the Confederation. Only Swiss citizens aged at least 18 can stand or vote and the citizens resident abroad can register to vote in the canton in which they last resided (or their canton of citizenship, otherwise) and be able to vote no matter how long since, or whether they ever have, lived in Switzerland.

The 46 members of the Council of States are elected in 20 two-seat constituencies (representing the 20 'full' cantons) and six single-member constituencies (representing the six half-cantons). Two 'full' cantons with small populations — Uri and Glarus — have therefore each two seats in the Council of States but only one seat each in the much larger National Council. In Jura and Neuchâtel the elections are held using proportional representation, whilst the other 24 use the majority system.

With the exception of the cantons of Neuchâtel and Jura (which use proportional representation to elect their councilors), councilors are elected through an up to two-round system of voting. In the first round of voting, candidates must obtain an absolute majority of the vote in order to be elected. If no candidate receives an absolute majority in the first round of voting then a second round is held in which a simple plurality is sufficient to be elected. The top two finishing candidates in the second round are elected.

As each canton regulates its election to the Council of States, the rules regarding who can stand as a candidate and vote in these elections varies canton-by-canton. Jura and Neuchâtel allow certain foreign residents to vote, whilst Glarus allows 16- and 17-year-olds the vote. Swiss citizens abroad registered to vote in a canton are permitted to vote in that canton's Council of States election only if the canton's law allows it. Schaffhausen has compulsory voting, though limited in implementation by way of only an insignificant fine.

Parties can cooperate as political groups, called parliamentary groups in switzerland. Members of the National Council are required to be in a political group in order to be able to sit on a committee.

Political group		Parties	President
V	Swiss People's Party group Fraktion der Schweizerischen Volkspartei; Groupe de l'Union Démocratique du Centre	SVP/UDC, Lega, MCR, Ind.	Thomas Aeschi
S	Social Democratic group Sozialdemokratische fraction Groupe socialiste	SP/PS	Roger Nordmann
RL	FDP-Liberal-Radical group FDP-Liberale fraktion Groupe Libéral-Radical	FDP/PLR	Beat Walti
C	CVP group CVP-fraktion; Groupe PDC	CVP/PDC, EVP/PEV, CSP OW	Filippo Lombardi
G	Greens group Grüne fraktion Groupe des Verts	GPS/PÉS, PdA/PST	Balthasar Glättli
BD	BDP group BDP fraktion Groupe PBD	BDP/PBD	Rosmarie Quadranti
GL	Green-liberal group Grünliberale fraktion Groupe Vert'Libéral	GLP/PVL	Tiana Angelina Moser

== Contesting parties ==
The table below lists contesting parties represented in the Federal Assembly before the election.

Name		Ideology	Leader	2015 result		
Name		Ideology	Leader	Votes (%)	National Council	Council of States
SVP / UDC	Swiss People's Party	National conservatism Right-wing populism	Albert Rösti	29.4%	65 / 200	5 / 46
SP / PS	Social Democratic Party	Social democracy Democratic socialism	Christian Levrat	18.8%	43 / 200	12 / 46
FDP / PLR	FDP.The Liberals	Liberalism; Conservative liberalism	Petra Gössi	16.4%	33 / 200	13 / 46
CVP / PDC	Christian Democratic People's Party	Christian democracy Social conservatism	Gerhard Pfister	11.6%	27 / 200	13 / 46
GPS / PES	Green Party	Green politics Progressivism	Regula Rytz	7.1%	11 / 200	1 / 46
GLP / PVL	Green Liberal Party	Green liberalism Social liberalism	Jürg Grossen	4.6%	7 / 200	0 / 46
BDP / PBD	Conservative Democratic Party	Liberal conservatism	Martin Landolt	4.1%	7 / 200	1 / 46
EVP / PEV	Evangelical People's Party	Christian democracy Social conservatism	Marianne Streiff	1.9%	2 / 200	0 / 46
Lega	Ticino League	Regionalism; Right-wing populism	Attilio Bignasca	1.0%	2 / 200	0 / 46
PdA / PST	Swiss Party of Labour	Communism	Gavriel Pinson	0.4%	1 / 200	0 / 46
MCG	Geneva Citizens' Movement	Regionalism; Right-wing populism	Francisco Valentin	0.3%	1 / 200	0 / 46

Other parties contesting in at least three cantons are:

- Federal Democratic Union (Christian right)
- Alternative List (socialism)
- Pirate Party (pirate politics)
- Christian Social Party (Christian left)
- Swiss Democrats (nationalism)
- Integral Politics (integral theory)

== Opinion polls ==
=== Graphical summary ===
The chart below depicts opinion polls conducted for the 2019 Swiss federal election; trendlines are local regressions (LOESS).

=== Vote share ===
Polling firm	Fieldwork date	Sample size	SVP/ UDC	SP/ PS	FDP/ PLR	CVP/ PDC	GPS/ PES	GLP/ PVL	BDP/ PBD	EVP/ PEV	Others	Lead
2019 election	20 Oct 2019	–	25.6	16.8	15.1	11.4	13.2	7.8	2.4	2.1	5.6	8.8
Gallup	5 Sep–4 Oct 2019	2,065	26.9	18.5	15.9	10.5	10.5	7.4	3.1	–	7.2	8.4
Sotomo	26 Sep–2 Oct 2019	12,107	27.3	18.2	15.2	10.6	10.7	7.3	2.8	1.8	5.8	9.1
LeeWas	23–24 Sep 2019	20,515	27.9	18.0	15.6	10.4	10.2	7.2	3.2	–	7.4	9.9
Sotomo	19–25 Aug 2019	17,128	26.8	18.7	16.7	10.2	10.5	6.9	2.6	1.6	6.0	8.1
Sotomo	17–27 May 2019	10,388	26.5	19.1	16.2	10.6	10.1	6.4	2.9	1.8	6.4	7.4
LeeWas	22–23 May 2019	19,018	28.9	17.6	15.5	10.3	9.9	6.9	3.3	–	7.6	11.3
LeeWas	18–20 Feb 2019	22,326	29.2	18.4	15.9	9.9	9.6	6.7	3.9	–	6.4	10.8
Sotomo	1–7 Feb 2019	12,085	27.0	17.4	17.4	11.3	9.5	6.4	3.3	1.7	6.0	9.6
LeeWas	24–25 Sep 2018	19,412	29.7	17.9	17.0	9.9	7.1	5.7	4.0	–	8.7	11.8
gfs.bern	7–19 Sep 2018	27,105	28.0	18.7	17.3	11.0	9.1	5.9	2.0	1.9	6.1	9.3
Sotomo	13–18 Sep 2018	14,985	27.4	19.3	17.7	10.1	8.7	5.7	3.2	2.0	5.9	8.1
LeeWas	21–22 Jun 2018	14,851	29.2	18.0	16.4	10.0	7.2	5.7	4.7	–	8.8	11.2
LeeWas	4–5 Jan 2018	20,422	30.8	18.7	16.4	9.1	7.4	6.1	3.7	–	7.8	12.1
Sotomo	28 Sep–2 Oct 2017	14,063	28.7	17.7	17.1	10.9	8.1	5.4	3.4	–	8.6	11.0
gfs.bern	19 Feb–23 Mar 2017	1,210	28.3	20.3	17.3	10.7	8.8	4.9	3.0	–	6.7	8.0
gfs.bern	5 Sep–8 Oct 2016	972	29.9	18.7	16.7	10.5	7.6	5.6	3.5	–	7.5	11.2
OpinionPlus	29 Apr–4 May 2016	809	30.8	17.8	16.8	10.6	6.6	5.4	4.6	–	7.4	13.0
2015 election	18 Oct 2015	–	29.4	18.8	16.4	11.6	7.1	4.6	4.1	1.9	6.0	10.5

== Results ==
The Green Party and Green Liberal Party gained votes and seats while most other parties decreased in size. The Gallagher index for this election, a measure of non-proportionality, reached 2.46.

=== National Council ===
Party	Votes	%	Seats	+/–
Swiss People's Party	620,343	25.59	53	−12
Social Democratic Party	408,128	16.84	39	−4
FDP.The Liberals	366,303	15.11	29	−4
Green Party	321,018	13.24	28	+17
Christian Democratic People's Party	275,842	11.38	25	−2
Green Liberal Party	189,162	7.80	16	+9
Conservative Democratic Party	59,852	2.47	3	−4
Evangelical People's Party	50,317	2.08	3	+1
Federal Democratic Union	25,434	1.05	1	+1
Swiss Party of Labour	25,427	1.05	1	0
Solidarity	25,427	1.05	1	New
Ticino League	18,187	0.75	1	−1
Alternative List	7,709	0.32	0	0
Pirate Party	6,602	0.27	0	New
Christian Social Party	6,238	0.26	0	0
Geneva Citizens' Movement	5,388	0.22	0	−1
Swiss Democrats	3,202	0.13	0	0
The Independents	3,079	0.13	0	New
Integral Politics	2,849	0.12	0	0
TEAM 65+ – The Aargau Senior List	2,612	0.11	0	New
Armin Capaul Independent and Other Independents	2,305	0.10	0	New
Young Alternative JA!	1,935	0.08	0	New
Citizens' Association Valais	1,756	0.07	0	New
People with a Future Say Goodbye to 5G!	1,695	0.07	0	New
Luke Gasser (OW)	1,675	0.07	0	New
The Good	1,355	0.06	0	New
Direct Democracy, Spirituality and Nature	1,255	0.05	0	New
Party-free	1,030	0.04	0	0
Target 2030	1,010	0.04	0	New
More Women	908	0.04	0	New
Blue PLanet	872	0.04	0	New
MontagnaViva	736	0.03	0	New
Swiss Hemp Party	727	0.03	0	0
Green League	699	0.03	0	New
Ecological Urgency	676	0.03	0	New
Citizen Transition List	603	0.02	0	New
Swiss Nationalist Party	582	0.02	0	0
Country List	511	0.02	0	New
Nice to Dream	444	0.02	0	New
Free Voters Aargau	442	0.02	0	New
People's Action against Too Many Foreigners and Asylum Seekers	437	0.02	0	0
Luzi Stamm	415	0.02	0	New
JutziPhilipp.com	367	0.02	0	0
Artist Party	314	0.01	0	New
The Plough	287	0.01	0	New
Independence Party up!	274	0.01	0	0
Federation	265	0.01	0	New
The Dear, Very, Very Dear Party	264	0.01	0	New
Solution-Oriented People's Movement	260	0.01	0	New
Party of Unlimited Opportunities	237	0.01	0	New
Independent Citizen Movement	202	0.01	0	New
Prophète Eco – «Santé!»	191	0.01	0	New
Health-Energy-Nature	169	0.01	0	0
Christ-und-Politik.CH	92	0.00	0	New
Eco-Party Switzerland	88	0.00	0	New
Civic List	88	0.00	0	New
European Federalist Party	82	0.00	0	New
Sarantidis Chrisoula	53	0.00	0	New
Other parties	1,258	0.05	0	–
Total	2,424,251	100.00	200	0
Valid votes	2,424,260	98.44		
Invalid votes	29,015	1.18		
Blank votes	9,366	0.38		
Total votes	2,462,641	100.00		
Registered voters/turnout	5,459,218	45.11		
Source: BFS

=== Council of States ===
Party	Seats	+/–
Christian Democratic People's Party	13	0
FDP.The Liberals	12	–1
Social Democratic Party	9	–3
Swiss People's Party	6	+1
Green Party	5	+4
Conservative Democratic Party	0	–1
Independents	1	0
Total	46	0
Source: ch.ch

=== Elected candidates by canton ===
==== Canton of Aargau ====
Party	Candidates	Seats
National Council
Swiss People's Party	Hansjörg Knecht; Thomas Burgherr; Andreas Glarner; Martina Bircher; Jean-Pierre Gallati; Benjamin Glezendanner	6
Social Democratic Party	Yvonne Feri; Cédric Wermuth; Gabriela Suter	3
FDP.The Liberals	Thierry Burkart; Matthias Samuel Jauslin	2
Christian Democratic People's Party	Ruth Humbel; Marianne Binder-Keller	2
Green Party	Irène Kälin	1
Green Liberal Party	Beat Flach	1
Evangelical People's Party	Lilian Studer	1
Council of States (2nd round was held on 24 November)
FDP.The Liberals	Thierry Burkart	1
Swiss People's Party	Hansjörg Knecht	1

==== Canton of Appenzell Ausserrhoden ====
Party	Candidates	Seats
National Council
Swiss People's Party	David Zuberbühler	1
Council of States
FDP.The Liberals	Andrea Caroni	1

==== Canton of Appenzell Innerrhoden ====
Party	Candidates	Seats
National Council
Christian Democratic People's Party	Thomas Rechsteiner	1
Council of States
Christian Democratic People's Party	Daniel Fässler	1

==== Canton of Basel-Landschaft ====
Party	Candidates	Seats
National Council
Swiss People's Party	Thomas de Courten; Sandra Sollberger	2
Social Democratic Party	Samira Marti; Eric Nussbaumer	2
Green Party	Maya Graf	1
FDP.The Liberals	Daniela Schneeberger	1
Christian Democratic People's Party	Elisabeth Schneider-Schneiter	1
Council of States (2nd round was held on 24 November)
Green Party	Maya Graf	1

==== Canton of Basel-Stadt ====
Party	Candidates	Seats
National Council
Social Democratic Party	Eva Herzog; Beat Jans	2
Green Party	Sibel Arslan	1
Green Liberal Party	Katja Christ	1
Liberal Democratic Party (Basel)	Christoph Eymann	1
Council of States
Social Democratic Party	Eva Herzog	1

==== Canton of Bern ====
Party	Candidates	Seats
National Council
Swiss People's Party	Andreas Aebi; Andrea Geissbühler; Erich Hess; Nadja Pieren; Albert Rösti; Werner Salzmann; Erich von Siebenthal	7
Social Democratic Party	Nadine Masshardt; Flavia Wasserfallen; Tamara Funiciello; Matthias Aebischer	4
Green Party	Regula Rytz; Aline Trede; Christine Badertscher; Kilian Baumann	4
Green Liberal Party	Jürg Grossen; Kathrin Bertschy; Melanie Mettler	3
FDP.The Liberals	Christa Markwalder; Christian Wasserfallen	2
Conservative Democratic Party	Lorenz Hess; Beatrice Simon	2
Evangelical People's Party	Marianne Streiff	1
Federal Democratic Union	Andreas Gafner	1
Council of States (2nd round was held on 17 November)
Social Democratic Party	Hans Stöckli	1
Swiss People's Party	Werner Salzmann	1

==== Canton of Fribourg ====
Party	Candidates	Seats
National Council
Social Democratic Party	Ursula Schneider Schüttel; Valérie Piller Carrard	2
Christian Democratic People's Party	Christine Bulliard-Marbach; Marie-France Roth Pasquier	2
FDP.The Liberals	Jacques Bourgeois	1
Swiss People's Party	Pierre-André Page	1
Green Party	Gerhard Andrey	1
Council of States (2nd round held on 10 November)
Social Democratic Party	Christian Levrat	1
FDP.The Liberals	Johanna Gapany	1

==== Canton of Geneva ====
Party	Candidates	Seats
National Council
Green Party	Lisa Mazzone; Nicolas Walder; Delphine Klopfenstein Broggini	3
FDP.The Liberals	Christian Lüscher; Simone de Montmollin	2
Social Democratic Party	Laurence Fehlmann Rielle; Christian Dandrès	2
Swiss People's Party	Yves Nidegger; Céline Amaudruz	2
Christian Democratic People's Party	Vincent Maitre	1
Green Liberal Party	Michel Matter	1
Ensemble à gauche	Stéfanie Prezioso	1
Council of States (2nd round held on 10 November)
Green Party	Lisa Mazzone	1
Social Democratic Party	Carlo Sommaruga	1

==== Canton of Glarus ====
Party	Candidates	Seats
National Council
Conservative Democratic Party	Martin Landolt	1
Council of States
FDP.The Liberals	Thomas Hefti	1
Green Party	Mathias Zopfi	1

==== Grisons ====
Party	Candidates	Seats
National Council
Social Democratic Party	Jon Pult; Sandra Locher Benguerel	2
Swiss People's Party	Magdalena Martullo-Blocher	1
Christian Democratic People's Party	Martin Candinas	1
FDP.The Liberals	Anna Giacometti	1
Council of States
Christian Democratic People's Party	Stefan Engler	1
FDP.The Liberals	Martin Schmid	1

==== Canton of Jura ====
Party	Candidates	Seats
National Council
Social Democratic Party	Pierre-Alain Fridez	1
Christian Democratic People's Party	Jean-Paul Gschwind	1
Council of States
Social Democratic Party	Elisabeth Baume-Schneider	1
Christian Democratic People's Party	Charles Juillard	1

==== Canton of Lucerne ====
Party	Candidates	Seats
National Council
Christian Democratic People's Party	Ida Glanzmann-Hunkeler; Andrea Gmür; Leo Müller	3
Swiss People's Party	Yvette Estermann; Franz Grüter	2
FDP.The Liberals	Albert Vitali	1
Social Democratic Party	Prisca Birrer-Heimo	1
Green Party	Michael Töngi	1
Green Liberal Party	Roland Fischer	1
Council of States
FDP.The Liberals	Damian Müller	1
Christian Democratic People's Party	Andrea Gmür	1

==== Canton of Neuchâtel ====
Party	Candidates	Seats
National Council
FDP.The Liberals	Damien Cottier	1
Green Party	Fabien Fivaz	1
Social Democratic Party	Baptiste Hurni	1
Swiss Party of Labour	Denis de la Reussille	1
Council of States
FDP.The Liberals	Philippe Bauer	1
Green Party	Céline Vara	1

==== Canton of Nidwalden ====
Party	Candidates	Seats
National Council
Swiss People's Party	Peter Keller	1
Council of States
FDP.The Liberals	Hans Wicki	1

==== Canton of Obwalden ====
Party	Candidates	Seats
National Council
Swiss People's Party	Monika Rüegger-Hurschler	1
Council of States
Christian Democratic People's Party	Erich Ettlin	1

==== Canton of Schaffhausen ====
Party	Candidates	Seats
National Council
Swiss People's Party	Thomas Hurter	1
Social Democratic Party	Martina Munz	1
Council of States
Swiss People's Party	Hannes Germann	1
Independent	Thomas Minder	1

==== Canton of Schwyz ====
Party	Candidates	Seats
National Council
Swiss People's Party	Pirmin Schwander; Marcel Dettling	2
FDP.The Liberals	Petra Gössi	1
Christian Democratic People's Party	Alois Gmür	1
Council of States
Swiss People's Party	Alex Kuprecht	1
Christian Democratic People's Party	Othmar Reichmuth	1

==== Canton of Solothurn ====
Party	Candidates	Seats
National Council
Swiss People's Party	Walter Wobmann; Christian Imark	2
FDP.The Liberals	Kurt Fluri	1
Social Democratic Party	Franziska Roth	1
Christian Democratic People's Party	Stefan Müller-Altermatt	1
Green Party	Felix Wettstein	1
Council of States
Christian Democratic People's Party of Switzerland	Pirmin Bischof	1
Social Democratic Party	Roberto Zanetti	1

==== Canton of St. Gallen ====
Party	Candidates	Seats
National Council
Swiss People's Party	Lukas Reimann; Roland Rino Büchel; Mike Egger; Esther Friedli	4
Christian Democratic People's Party	Markus Ritter; Nicolo Paganini	2
FDP.The Liberals	Marcel Dobler; Susanne Vincenz-Stauffacher	2
Social Democratic Party	Barbara Gysi; Claudia Dobler	2
Green Party	Franziska Ryser	1
Green Liberal Party	Thomas Brunner	1
Council of States (2nd round was held on 17 November)
Christian Democratic People's Party	Beni Würth	1
Social Democratic Party	Paul Rechsteiner	1

==== Canton of Thurgau ====
Party	Candidates	Seats
National Council
Swiss People's Party	Verena Herzog; Diana Gutjahr; Manuel Strupler	3
Christian Democratic People's Party	Christian Lohr	1
Social Democratic Party	Edith Graf-Litscher	1
Green Party	Kurt Egger	1
Council of States
Christian Democratic People's Party	Brigitte Häberli-Koller	1
Swiss People's Party	Jakob Stark	1

==== Canton of Ticino ====
Party	Candidates	Seats
National Council
FDP.The Liberals	Rocco Cattaneo; Alex Farinelli	2
Christian Democratic People's Party	Marco Romano; Fabio Regazzi	2
Ticino League	Lorenzo Quadri	1
Social Democratic Party	Bruno Storni	1
Green Party	Greta Gysin	1
Swiss People's Party	Bruno Marchesi	1
Council of States (2nd round was held on 17 November)
Swiss People's Party	Marco Chiesa	1
Social Democratic Party	Marina Carobbio Guscetti	1

==== Canton of Uri ====
Party	Candidates	Seats
National Council
Christian Democratic People's Party	Simon Stadler	1
Council of States
FDP.The Liberals	Josef Dittli	1
Christian Democratic People's Party	Heidi Z'graggen	1

==== Canton of Valais ====
Party	Candidates	Seats
National Council
Christian Democratic People's Party	Benjamin Roduit; Sidney Kamerzin; Philipp Matthias Bregy	3
Swiss People's Party	Jean-Luc Addor; Franz Ruppen	2
FDP.The Liberals	Philippe Nantermod	1
Social Democratic Party	Mathias Reynard	1
Green Party	Christophe Clivaz	1
Council of States (2nd round held on 3 November)
Christian Democratic People's Party	Beat Rieder; Marianne Maret	2

==== Canton of Vaud ====
Party	Candidates	Seats
National Council
FDP.The Liberals	Olivier Français; Frédéric Borloz; Olivier Feller; Isabelle Moret; Jacqueline de Quattro	5
Social Democratic Party	Ada Marra; Samuel Bendahan; Brigitte Crottaz; Roger Nordmann; Pierre-Yves Maillard	5
Green Party	Adèle Thorens Goumaz; Daniel Brélaz; Léonore Porchet; Sophie Michaud Gigon	4
Swiss People's Party	Jean-Pierre Grin; Michaël Buffat; Jacques Nicolet	3
Green Liberal Party	Isabelle Chevalley; François Pointet	2
Council of States (2nd round held on 10 November)
FDP.The Liberals	Olivier Français	1
Green Party	Adèle Thorens Goumaz	1

==== Canton of Zug ====
Party	Candidate	Seats
National Council
Swiss People's Party	Thomas Aeschi	1
Christian Democratic People's Party	Gerhard Pfister	1
Green Party	Manuela Weichelt-Picard	1
Council of States
Christian Democratic People's Party	Peter Hegglin	1
FDP.The Liberals	Matthias Michel	1

==== Canton of Zurich ====
Party	Candidates	Seats
National Council
Swiss People's Party	Roger Köppel; Gregor Rutz; Alfred Heer; Thomas Matter; Hans-Ueli; Barbara Steinemann; Bruno Walliser; Mauro Tuena; Martin Haab; Therese Schläpfer	9
Social Democratic Party	Angelo Barrile; Priska Graf Seiler; Jacqueline Badran; Mattea Meyer; Min Li Marti; Fabian Molina; Céline Widmer	7
Green Party	Katharina Prelicz-Huber; Marionna Schlatter; Balthasar Glättli; Bastien Girod; Meret Schneider	6
Green Liberal Party	Tiana Angelina Moser; Martin Bäumle; Corina Gredig; Jörg Mäder; Judith Bellaïche; Barbara Schaffner	6
FDP.The Liberals	Doris Fiala; Hans-Peter Portmann; Beat Walti; Regine Sauter; Andri Silberschmidt	5
Christian Democratic People's Party	Philipp Kutter	1
Evangelical People's Party	Niklaus Gugger	1
Council of States
Social Democratic Party	Daniel Jositsch	1
FDP.The Liberals	Ruedi Noser	1

== Aftermath ==
The 2019 federal election was followed by the Federal Council election on 11 December 2019. The Green Party failed to win a seat in the Federal Council despite becoming the fourth largest party in the National Council.

== See also ==
- List of members of the National Council of Switzerland, 2019–23
