= Franziska Roth =

Swiss politician (born 1966)

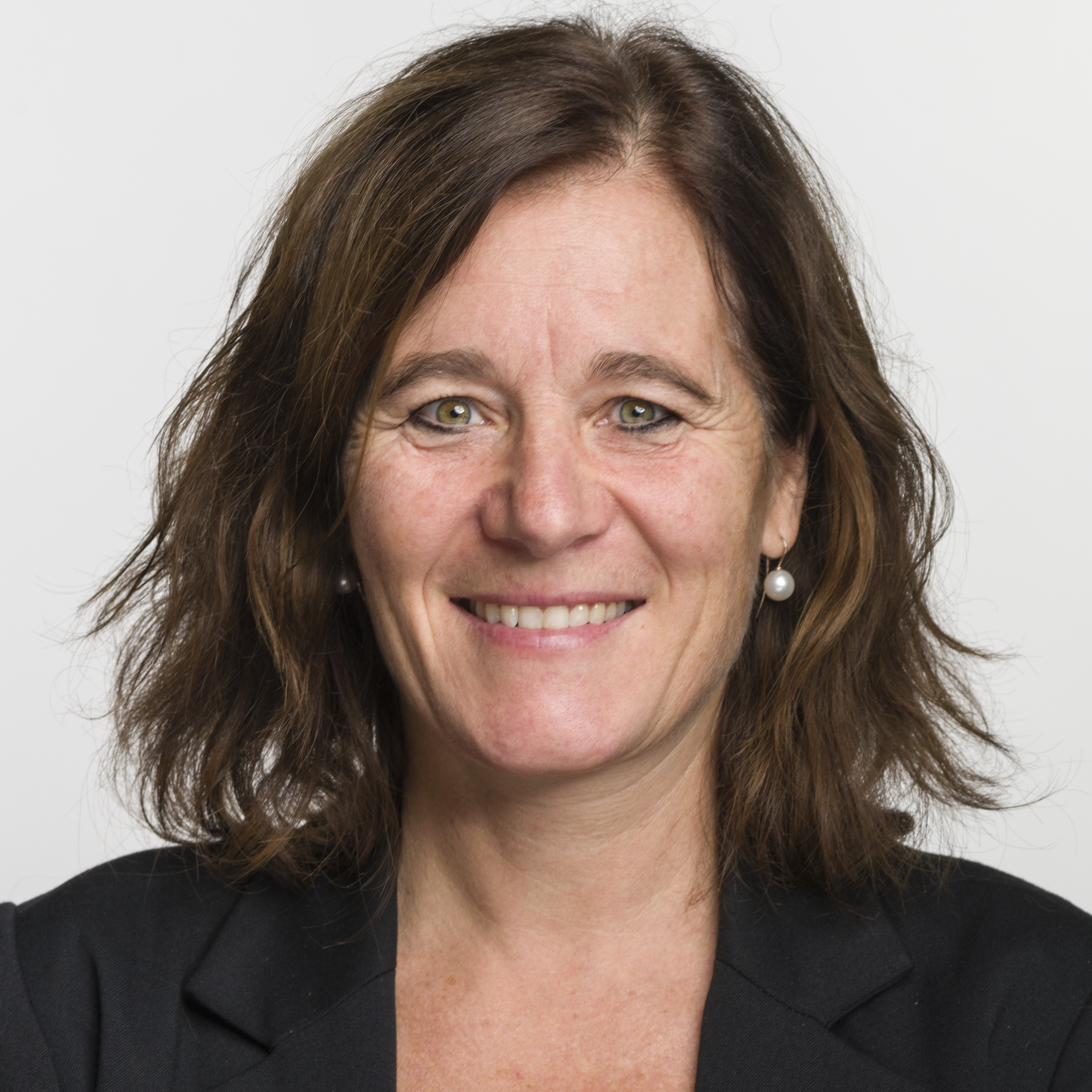
Franziska Roth

Franziska Roth (born 17 April 1966) is a pedagogue and politician of the Social Democrat Party of Switzerland (SP). Since 2019, she is a current member of the National Council, the lower house of the Swiss Parliament.

== Education and professional career ==
She graduated from the vocational school in Solothurn in 1987. Following she was a teacher for primary school in Herbetswil until 2008. Since about 2000, she rides to work on a bicycle between March and October. From 2008 onwards she works as a pedagogue in several municipalities in Solothurn such as in Balsthal or in Bettlach.

== Political career ==
Since 2005 she is a member of the municipal council of Solothurn and in 2011 she was a candidate for the National Council, but was not elected. 2012 she assumed as the president of the cantonal branch of the SP in Solothurn. She was elected to the National Council in the Federal elections of 2019. She was elected as the sole representative of the SP for the Canton Solothurn, as one was not re-elected. In 2021, she resigned as the president of the Solothurn branch of the SP. In October 2022, she announced her candidacy for the Council of States, the Upper House of the Swiss Parliament for the federal elections of 2023.

=== Political positions ===
In 2018, Franziska Roth defended the right of immigrant students to speak in their native language as in Egerkingen, a school demanded they speak in German also during the school breaks.

As her party wanted to exclude men for the Federal Councilor elections of December 2022, Roth argued that everyone should be allowed to have a word in a democratic party. But eventually the party only nominated women for the Federal Council as it already had a man to represent the party in the Federal council and the party sees itself as a supporter of gender equality. Due to the Russo-Ukrainian war and as a member of the security commission of the parliament, she became much more aware of the necessity of a Swiss army. She also argued that issues such as terrorism, cyber security or espionage should receive more attention from the Swiss army.

== Personal life ==
She lives with a partner and is the mother of two children. Since about 2000 she rides by bike to work in the warmer months of the year as she is worried for the environment and prefers to be an example to others than holding discussions. From Solothurn she rides with the bike to the sessions in parliament in Bern. She has an affinity towards Italy, where she often spends her vacations. She has two cars, a Peugeot van with which she travels into vacations and a red Fiat Cinquecento. Her nickname is the Italian Rosso, which translates into red. Her bike is also a Bianchi from Italy.
