= Eva Herzog =

Swiss politician (born 1962)

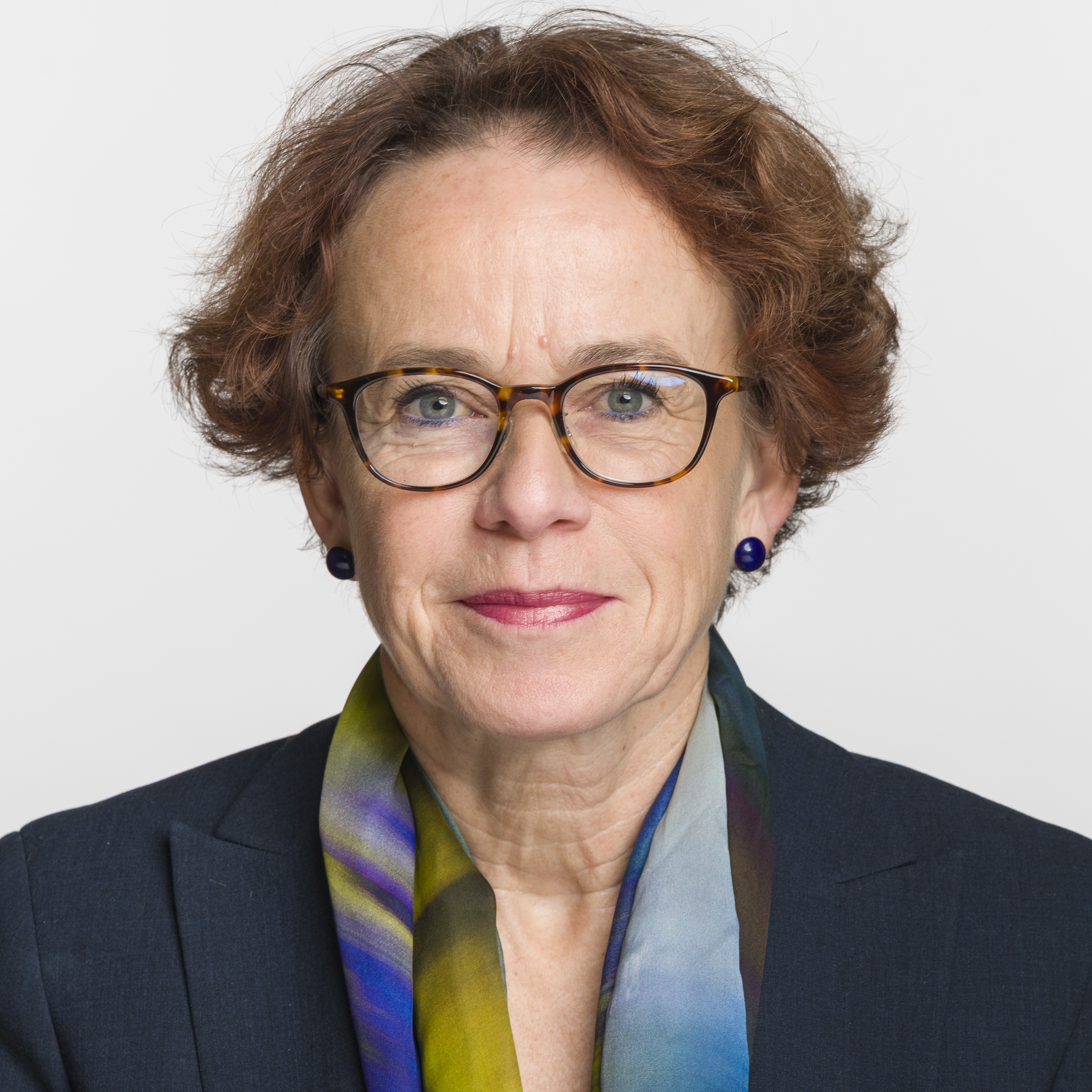
- Official portrait, 2019

President of the Council of States
- In office 4 December 2023 – 2 December 2024
- Preceded by: Brigitte Häberli-Koller
- Succeeded by: Andrea Caroni

Member of the Council of States for Basel-Stadt
- Incumbent
- Assumed office 2 December 2019
- Preceded by: Anita Fetz

Member of the State Council of Basel-Stadt
- In office 1 February 2005 – 31 January 2020
- Preceded by: Ueli Vischer
- Succeeded by: Tanja Soland

Personal details
- Born: Eva Herzog; 25 December 1961 (age 64) Basel, Switzerland
- Party: Social Democratic Party
- Education: History
- Alma mater: University of Basel
- Website: evaherzog.ch

Eva Herzog (born 25 December 1961) is a Swiss politician who has represented the Basel-Stadt canton in the Council of States since 2019 and served as President of the Council in 2023–2024. She is a member of the Social Democratic Party (SP/PS).

== Education ==
Between 1981 and 1988, she studied History, Economics and Spanish at the University in Basel and University of Santiago de Compostela and graduated with a MSc in 1988. She obtained a Doctorate degree in History in 1994.

== Professional career ==
Between 1995 and 2000, she held a leading position in the management of the Artspace Kaserne in Basel. From 2001 until 2004, she was employed as a scientific collaborator at the University of Basel.

== Political career ==
She was elected in to the Grand Council of Basel-Stadt in 2001 and in 2003, she assumed the presidency of the SP group in the Grand Council. She remained a member of the Grand Council until 2005, when she assumed as a member of the Executive Council of Basel-Stadt and onwards headed the finance department.

In May 2019, she announced that she would resign as a State Council of Basel in January 2020. In October 2019 she was elected to the Council of States. As she was a candidate for both the Council of State and the National Council, Mustafa Atici assumed her post in the National Council.

In 2010, she was a candidate for the Federal Council as a successor for the resigning Moritz Leuenberger. But in the elections Simonetta Sommaruga was elected.

After in November 2022, Simmonetta Sommaruga announced her resignation, she and Elisabeth Baume-Schneider became the candidate for Sommarug's succession. On the 7 December, Baume-Schneider was elected to the Federal Council and a week later Eva Herzog to the Vice-Presidency to the Council of States.
