= Brigitte Häberli-Koller =

Swiss politician (born 1958)

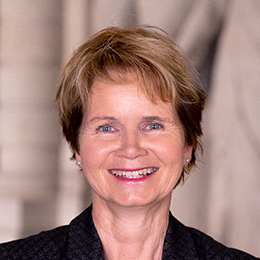
- Official portrait, 2022

President of the Council of States
- In office 28 November 2022 – 4 December 2023
- Preceded by: Thomas Hefti
- Succeeded by: Eva Herzog

Member of the Council of States for Thurgau
- Incumbent
- Assumed office 5 December 2011
- Preceded by: Philipp Stähelin

Member of the National Council
- In office 1 December 2003 – 4 December 2011

Personal details
- Born: 23 August 1958 (age 67) Wetzikon, Zürich, Switzerland
- Party: The Centre (2021–present)
- Other party: Christian Democratic People's Party (until 2021)
- Children: 3

Brigitte Häberli-Koller (born 23 August 1958) is a Swiss politician of The Centre (DM/LC) party, formerly of the Christian Democratic People's Party (CVP/PDC, until 2021). She was a member of the National Council from 2003 to 2011 and has been a member of the Council of States since 2011, of which she served as its president from 2022 to 2023.

== Early life and education ==
Brigitte Häberli was born in August 1958 in Wetzikon, Canton of Zürich but has her place of origin in Münchenbuchsee in Canton of Bern. After she completed her apprenticeship as a merchant, she worked for some time in Zurich.

== Political career ==
She joined The Centre in In 1996 she became a member of the Executive Council of Bichelsee-Balterswil, the same year she was also elected into the Grand Council of Thurgau representing CVP. She worked for both political offices until 2003. In the Federal Elections of 2003, she was elected into the National Council by a margin of sixteen votes, representing the CVP for Thurgau. In 2005, she was discussed as possible president of CVP, but then declined. 2011 she was a member of the National Council. In the Federal Elections of 2011 she was elected into the Council of States. She was the first women to represent the Canton of Thurgau in the Council of States. In November 2022 she was elected as the president of the Council of States. Élisabeth Baume-Schneider of the Social Democratic Party (SP) and Lisa Mazzone of the Green Party (GP) will assume the first and second Vice-Presidencies, therefore making it the first Council of States presided by three women.

=== Presidency of Council of States ===
In her inaugurating speech, Brigitte Häberli-Koller appealed to the political instrument of a direct democracy, which would allow the Swiss population to remain honest.

== Personal life ==
Brigitte Häberli-Koller is married and the mother of three children. Her political career is celebrated in her municipality and after her election to the presidency of the Council of States she was granted an honorary citizenship of Bichelsee-Balterswil. She lives in Bichelsee with her husband.
