= Sandra Locher Benguerel =

Swiss politician (born 1975)

Sandra Locher Bengeruel
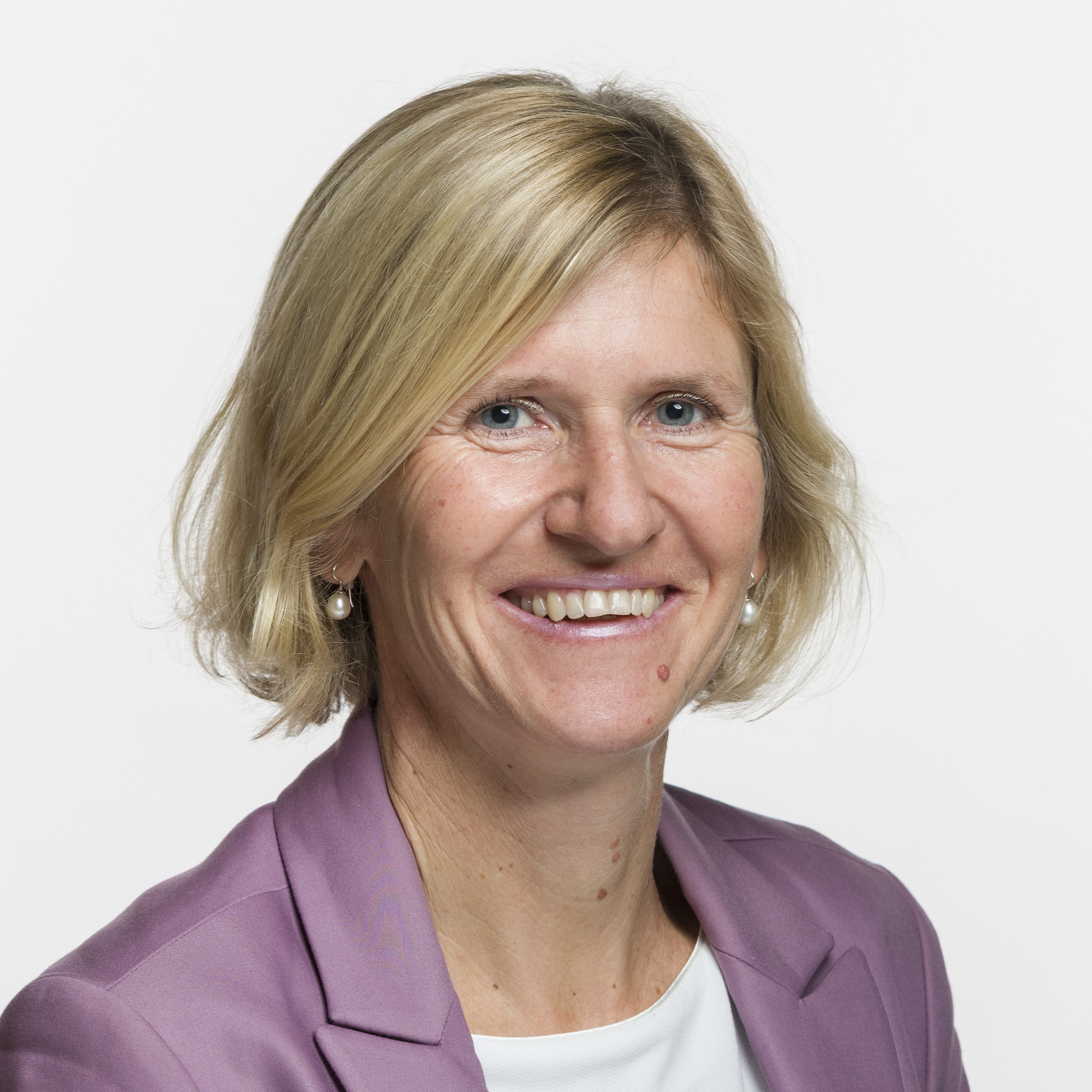

Member of the National Council
- Incumbent
- Assumed office 2019
- Constituency: Grison

Personal details
- Born: 6 September 1975 (age 50) Solothurn, Switzerland
- Profession: Educator

Sandra Locher Benguerel (6 September 1975) is an educator and politician of the Social Democratic Party of Switzerland (SP). Since 2019, she is a member of the National Council, the lower house of the Swiss Parliament.

== Early life and education ==
She was born in Solothurn in 1975 and was raised in Lüterkofen. In 1991, she enrolled in the vocational school in Solothurn from which she graduated in 1996. Following was a teacher for four years in Bettlach. In 2001 she settled in the Canton of Grisons where she learned the Romansh language. In Grison she was the educator primary school in Maladers and since 2005 she teaches a german romansh bilingual class. In 2015 she assumed the presidency of the LEGR, the teachers association of Grison a position she held until 2020. Aside she is a member of the board of the Vocational School of Grison.

== Political career ==
Her interest for politics arose when at the age of eighteen years, she held a speech on occasion of the Swiss National Day the 1 August. In 2010 she was elected into the Grand Council of Grison in which she presided over its Commission of Education and Culture between 2010 and 2014.

In the Federal Elections of 2019, she was elected into the National Council representing the SP for Grison. In the National Council she defended the politics of the mountainous cantons of Switzerland.

== Personal life ==
She is married and is a trained French and English teacher. After having taught for four years, she took a year off a traveled the world with an around the world ticket flight ticket. Despite she resides in Chur, she still has a strong bond to her place or origin in Solothurn. During the parliamentary sessions she lives with her parents in Solothurn and commutes to Bern.
