= Kilian Baumann =

Swiss politician (born 1980)

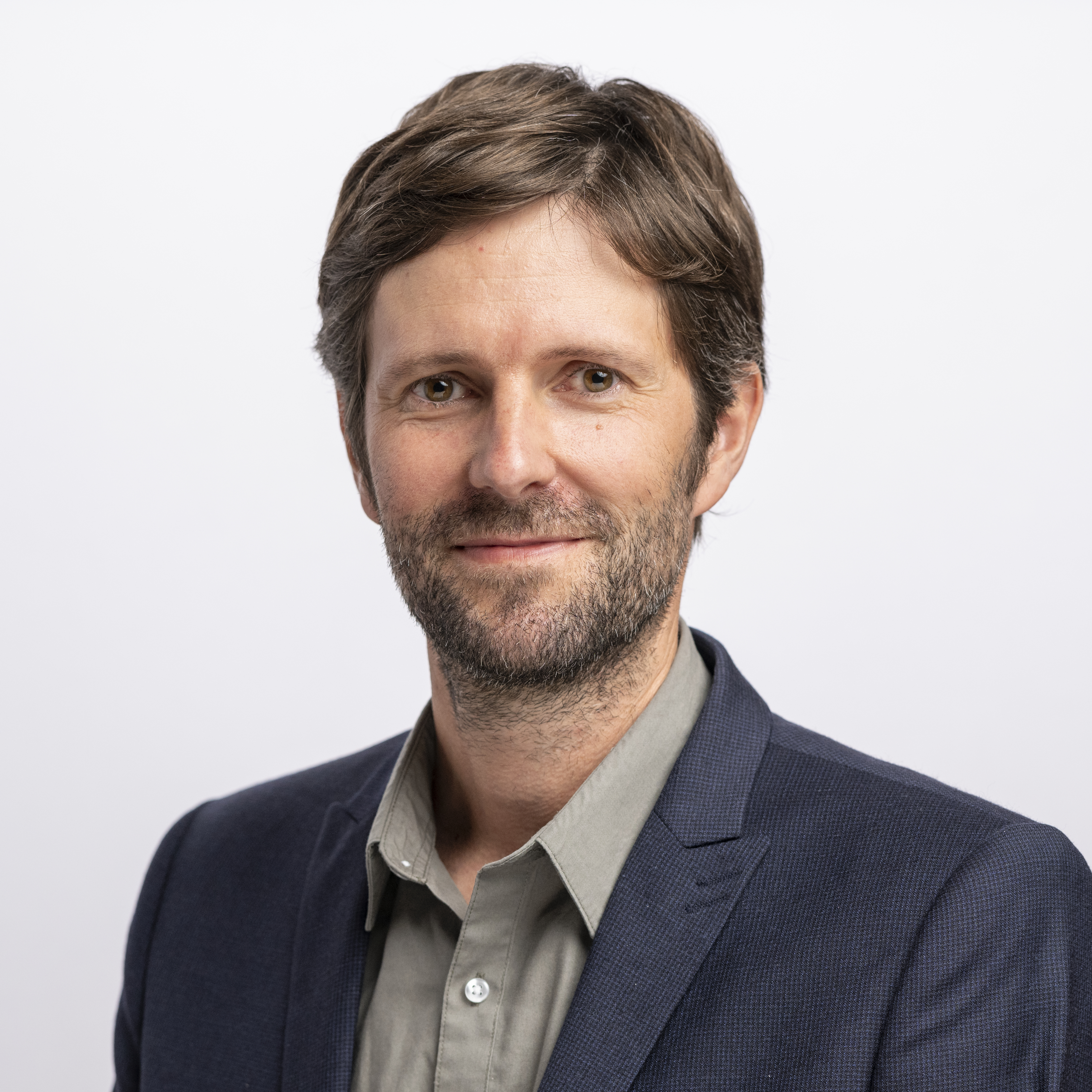

Member of the National Council of Switzerland
- Incumbent
- Assumed office 2 December 2019

Member of the Grand Council of the Canton of Bern
- In office June 2014 – November 2019

Personal details
- Born: December 14, 1980 (age 45) Bern, Switzerland
- Party: Green Party
- Occupation: Politician

Kilian Baumann (14 December 1980 in Bern, Switzerland) is a Swiss politician (Green Party).

== Political career ==
In 2014, Baumann was elected to the Grand Council of Bern for the Green Party, where he was a member of the Justice Commission from 2014 to 2018 and the Building, Energy, Transport and Spatial Planning Commission from 2017.

In 2018, he was re-elected and continued to be a member of the Building, Energy, Transport and Spatial Planning Commission until his resignation from the Grand Council in November 2019. In the national parliamentary elections of 20 October 2019, Baumann was elected to the National Council for the Green Party. He is a member of the Commission for Economic Affairs and Taxation.

Baumann is a member of the board of the Green Party of Seeland and the Small Farmers' Association. He was a member of the board of trustees of the Von Rütte-Gut Foundation in Sutz-Lattrigen and a member of the school board of the Vocational and Further Education Centre (BWZ) in Lyss.

In 2021, he was elected president of the Smallholders' Association. Furthermore, he is a member of the patronage committee of Aqua Viva.
