= Sophie Michaud Gigon =

Swiss politician (born 1975)

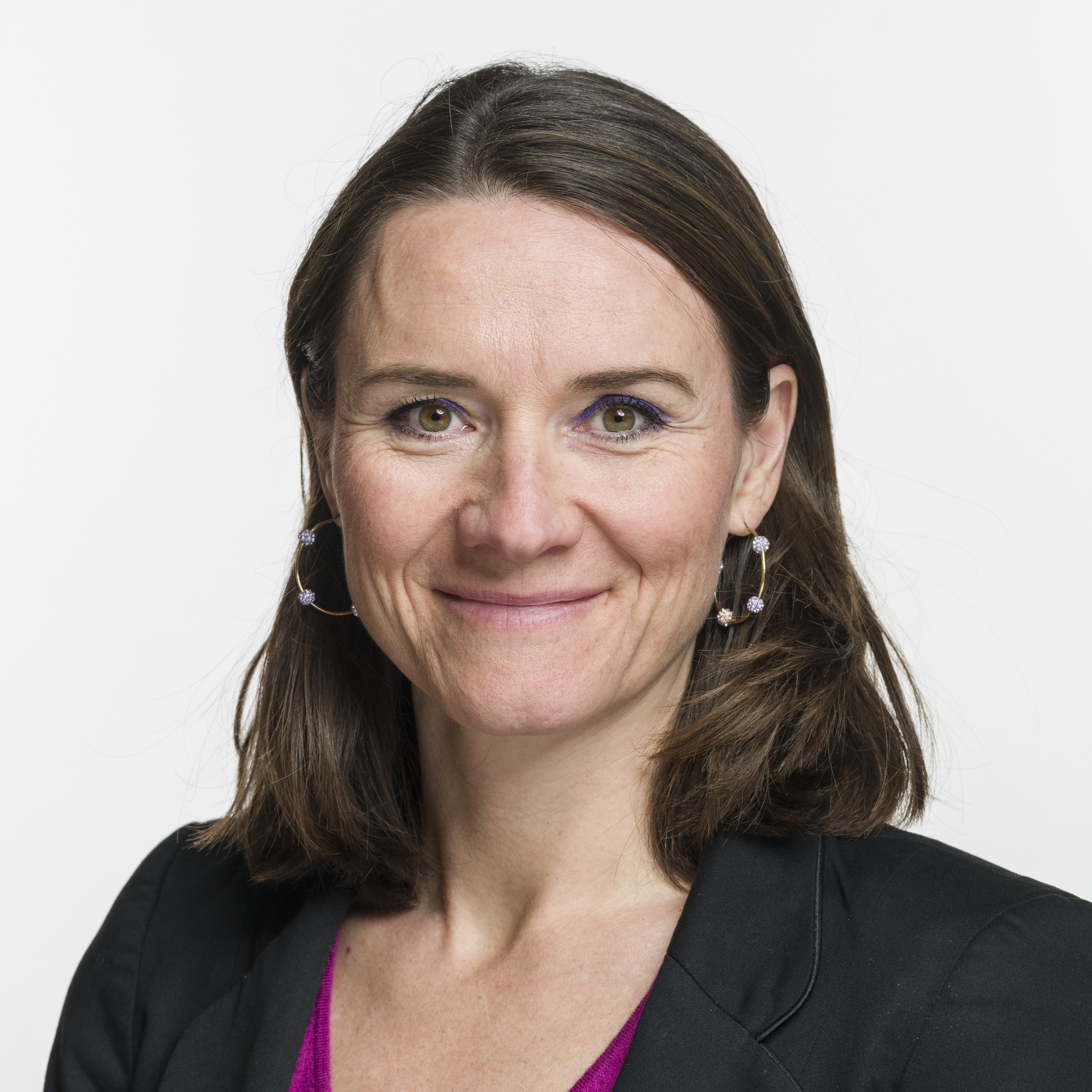

Member of the National Council of Switzerland
- Incumbent
- Assumed office December 2019

Member of the Municipal Council of Lausanne
- In office 2007–2019

Personal details
- Born: 20 January 1975 (age 51) Lausanne
- Party: Green Party of Switzerland

Sophie Michaud Gigon (20 January 1975, Lausanne, Switzerland) is a Swiss politician of the Green Party and a current member of the National Council.

== Education and early life ==
She grew up in the Suisse Romande, the francophone part of Switzerland. She studied German, French and political sciences at the universities of Lausanne, Tübingen and Zürich. In Tübingen she attended the university through the Erasmus programme.

== Professional career ==
In 2008 she assumed the secretariat of the francophone part of Switzerland for Pro Natura. Since 2017 she is the general secretary of the consumer rights association Fédération romande des consommateurs.

== Political career ==
She entered the municipal council of Lausanne in 2007. As a municipal councilor for the greens, she emphasized that if infrastructural improvements are made, then they should also encompass some green zones in the immediate environment. She was elected to the National Council in the Federal Elections in October 2019, and assumed her post in December of the same year. In the National Council, she is part of the commission on economy and taxes.

== Personal life ==
She is married and has two children.
