= Hans-Ueli Vogt =

Swiss jurist

Hans Ueli Vogt
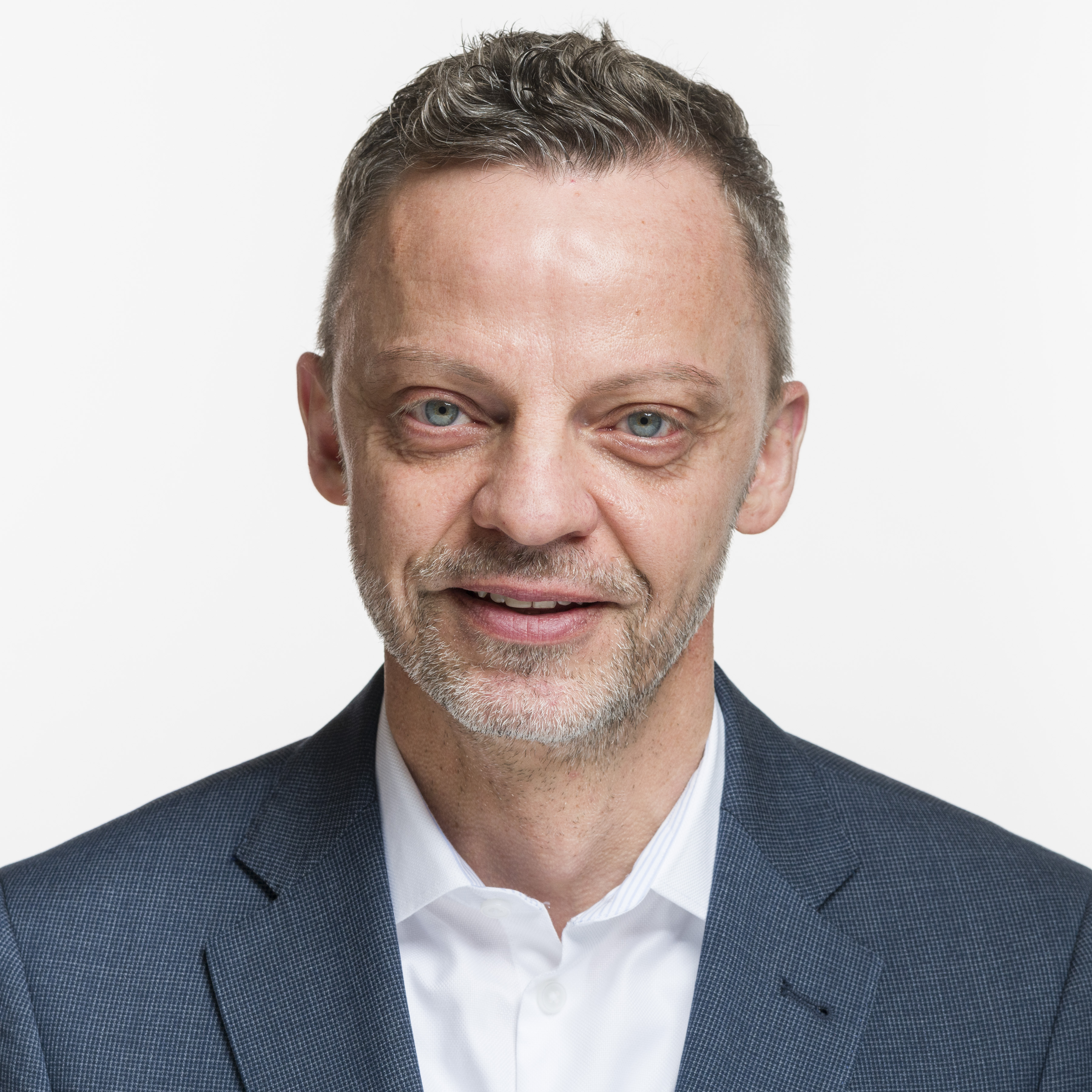
- Official portrait, 2019

Member of the National Council of Switzerland
- In office 2015–2021

Member of the Cantonal Council of Zurich
- In office 2011–2015

Personal details
- Born: December 5, 1969 (age 56) Winterthur, Switzerland
- Party: Swiss People's Party
- Education: University of St. Gallen (MBA); New York University (LLM); University of Zurich (PhD)

Hans-Ueli Vogt (born 5 December 1969) is a Swiss jurist. He is a law professor at the University of Zurich and a politician of the Swiss People's Party (SVP). He was a member of the National Council between 2015 and 2021 and announced his candidacy to the Federal Council in October 2022.

== Education ==
Vogt was born on 5 December 1969 in Winterthur. After Vogt completed high school in Wetzikon following which he studied at the University of St. Gallen, graduating with a Master of Business Administration. Between 1995 and 1998, he was employed as an assistant to and part-time researcher in the law department of the University if Zurich. In 1998, he became a member of the Bar of Zurich. He followed up on his studies at the School of Law at New York University from where he obtained an LL.M in 2000. In 2001, he also received a Doctorate from the University of Zurich. In 2002, Vogt also became a member of the lawyers Bar of New York.

== Legal career ==
He began his legal career at Sullivan & Cromwell LLP in 2000, where he was an associate until 2002. Since 2003 he was an assistant professor for law at the University of Zurich. In 2007, he was promoted a full professor in business and intellectual property law at the University of Zurich. Between 2009 and 2013 he was a counsel at the law firm Homburger. In 2009, he was also assigned a visiting professor in law at the Tsinghua University in Beijing and also in Kings College in London.

== Political career ==
Hans-Ueli Vogt is a member of the Swiss People's Party (SVP) for which he was elected into the Cantonal Council of Zurich in 2011 and in the Federal Elections of 2015 he was elected into the National Council. In the same year he was also a candidate to the Council of States, but not elected. He was re-elected to the National Council in 2019. In Parliament he was in the Committee for Legal Affairs. Vogt announced his resignation from the National Council for the end of 2021, preferring to focus on his career as a law professor at the university.

When Ueli Maurer announced his resignation from the Federal Council, Vogt announced his candidacy as his successor in October 2022. Out of five candidates, the SVP chose Vogt of the Canton of Zurich and Albert Rösti of the Canton of Bern as the party's official candidates. Federal Councilors are the executive branch of the Swiss Government and are elected by the Parliament and not by popular vote.

=== Political positions ===
He is a member of the SVP but also defends positions independently. He is credited with leading the electoral campaign for a referendum on the superiority of the Swiss constitutional law over the decisions of the European Court of Human Rights. The people then voted no to the referendum. Contrary to the position of the SVP, he supported the yes campaign in the referendum on homosexual marriages in 2021. He is not a seen as typical politician of the SVP.

== Personal life ==
He is homosexual lives in Kreis 5 in Zurich and is a fan of the German Schlager singer Helene Fischer.
