= Marionna Schlatter =

Swiss politician (born 1980)

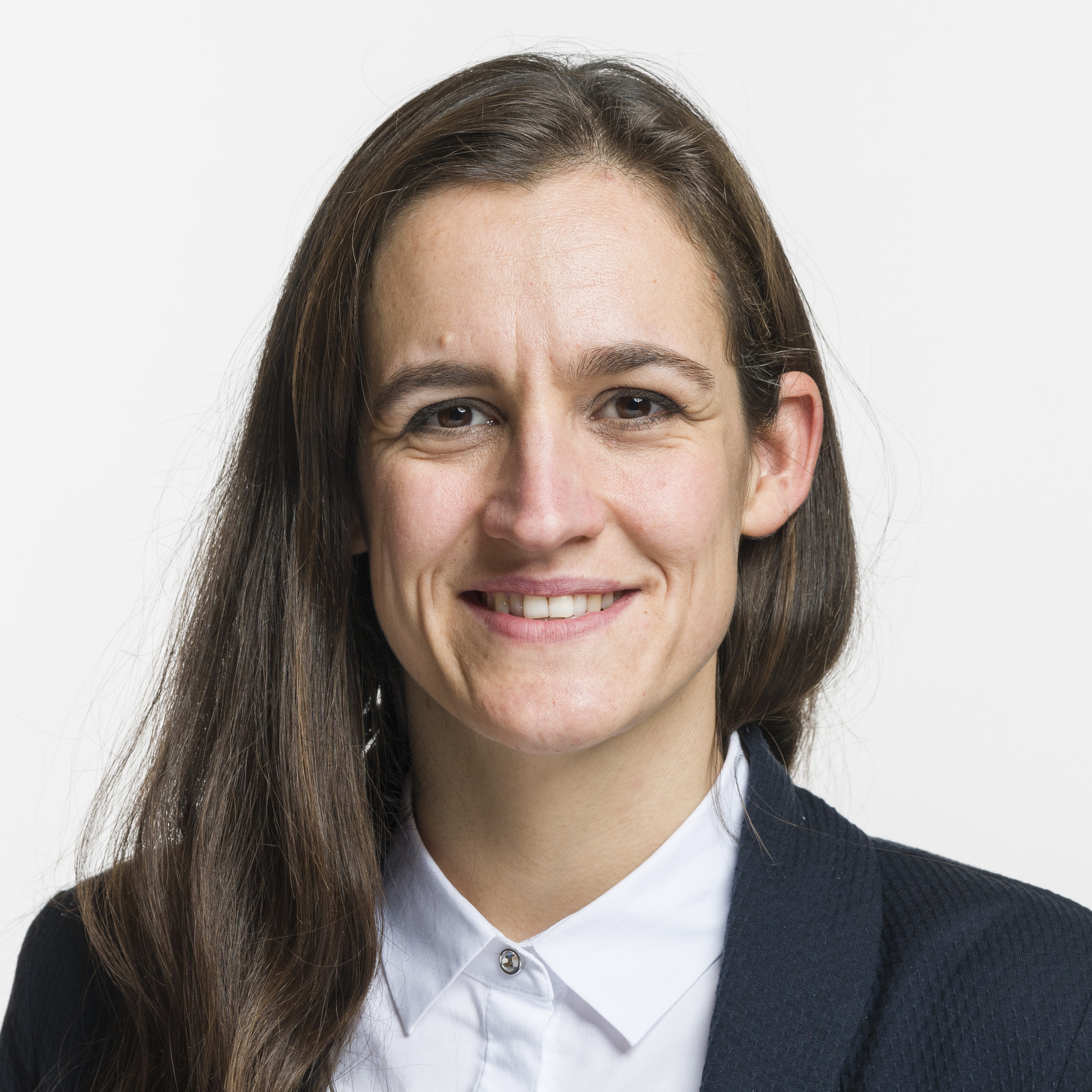

Member of the Cantonal Council of Zurich
- In office March 2019 – October 2019

Member of the National Council of Switzerland
- Incumbent
- Assumed office November 2019

Personal details
- Party: Green Party of Switzerland
- Occupation: Politician

Marionna Schlatter (14 November 1980) is a Swiss politician of the Green Party of Switzerland, and a former member of the Cantonal Council of Zurich and current member of the National Council.

== Early life and education ==
She was born to a Swiss father and Hungarian mother and attended primary school in Bäretswil and secondary school in Wetzikon. Following she enrolled into the University of Zurich studying History of Art and Architecture, Sociology and French, graduating with a MSc in 2007.

== Political career ==
She was the campaigner for the Youth wing of the Green Party between 2008 and 2010 and the President of the Green Party of the Canton Zurich from 2011 until 2020. She was elected in the Cantonal Council of Zurich in March 2019 and in the National Council in October 2019. In 2019, she was also a candidate to the Council of States, but was not elected. Following her election to the National Council, she resigned from the Cantonal Council of Zurich. She is currently a member of the board of directors of the Zurich branch of the Green Party.

== Personal life ==
She became a mushroom expert at the age of fourteen and today she is teaching others how to classify mushrooms. She is married and has 2 children.
