= Angelo Barrile =

Swiss politician (born 1976)

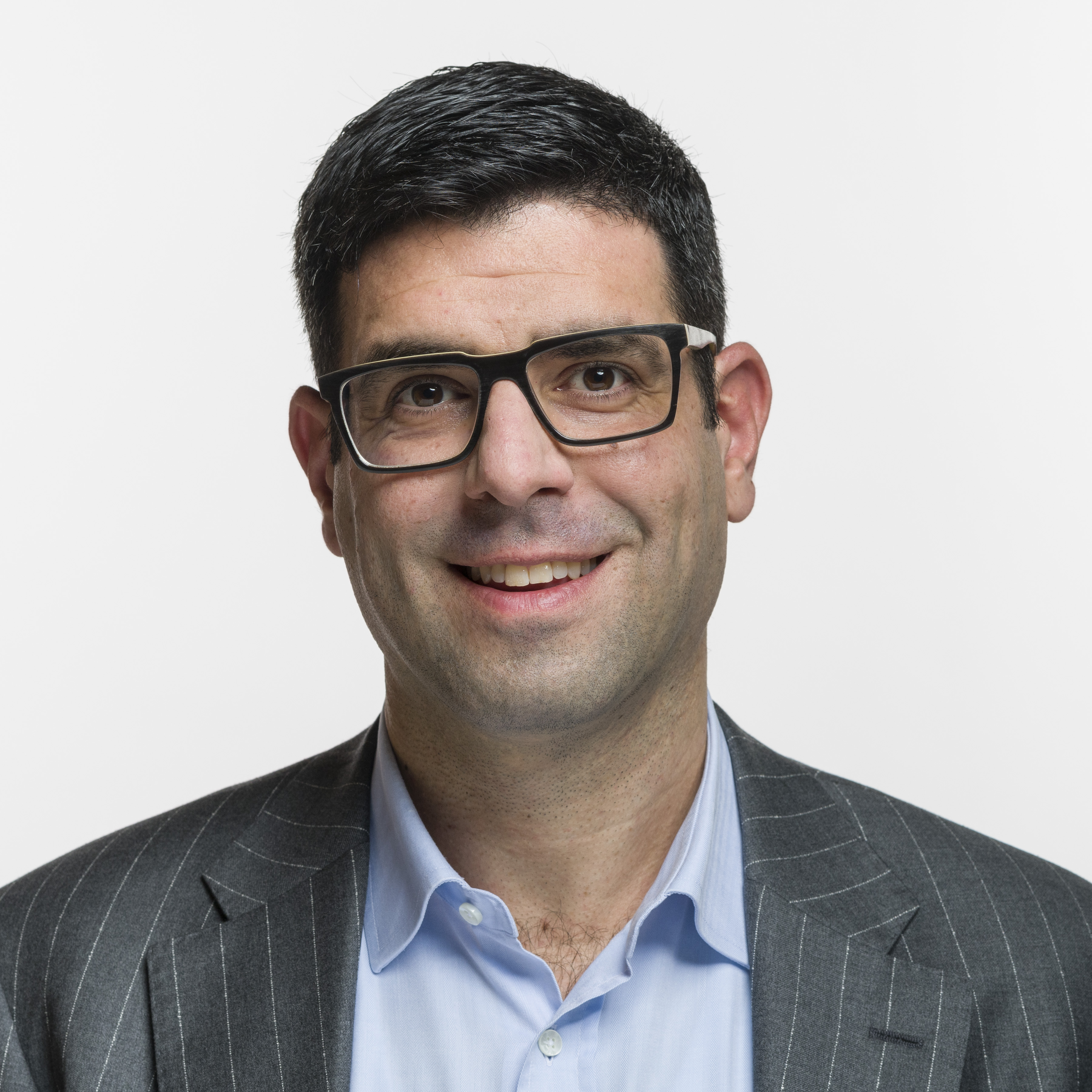

Member of 50th Swiss Federal Assembly (2015-2019)
- Incumbent
- Assumed office 8 December 2015

Personal details
- Born: August 22, 1976 Winterthur
- Party: Social Democratic Party of Switzerland
- Occupation: Medical Doctor

Angelo Barrile (born 22 August 1976) is a Swiss politician of the Social Democratic Party of Switzerland. He represents the Canton of Zürich in the Swiss National Council.

== Private life ==
Angelo Barrile's parents immigrated to Switzerland in the beginning of the 1970s as a working-class family from Sicily. Born in Winterthur as the first of two boys, Angelo Barrile grew up in Pfungen, where he went to kindergarten and primary school from 1981 to 1989. After obtaining his degree from Kantonsschule Rychenberg (high school) in 1996, he graduated in medicine from the University of Zürich in 2002. Angelo Barrile lives in the city of Zürich and is in a civil union with his long-term life partner.

== Professional career ==
In 2003, Angelo Barrile started working as an assistant doctor in the chirurgical clinic of the Muri hospital (Freiamt). From 2004 to 2005, he was an assistant doctor in the medical clinic in the Bülach hospital. From 2006 to 2009, he was an assistant doctor in the psychiatric hospital of the University of Zürich and from 2009 to 2012 an assistant doctor in the psychiatric-psychological service of the city of Zurich. Since 2012, he has been a doctor in a group practice for general internal medicine in Zurich.

== Political career ==
A member of the Social Democratic party since 1998, Angelo Barrile served in the Cantonal Council of Zürich from 2010 to 2015. He represented the Social Democrats in the Committee for Economy and Levies and became a member of the Committee for Social Security and Health in 2011. In the federal election in 2015, he was elected to the Swiss National Council where he represents the Social Democrats in the Political Institutions Committee.
