= Marianne Streiff-Feller =

Swiss politician

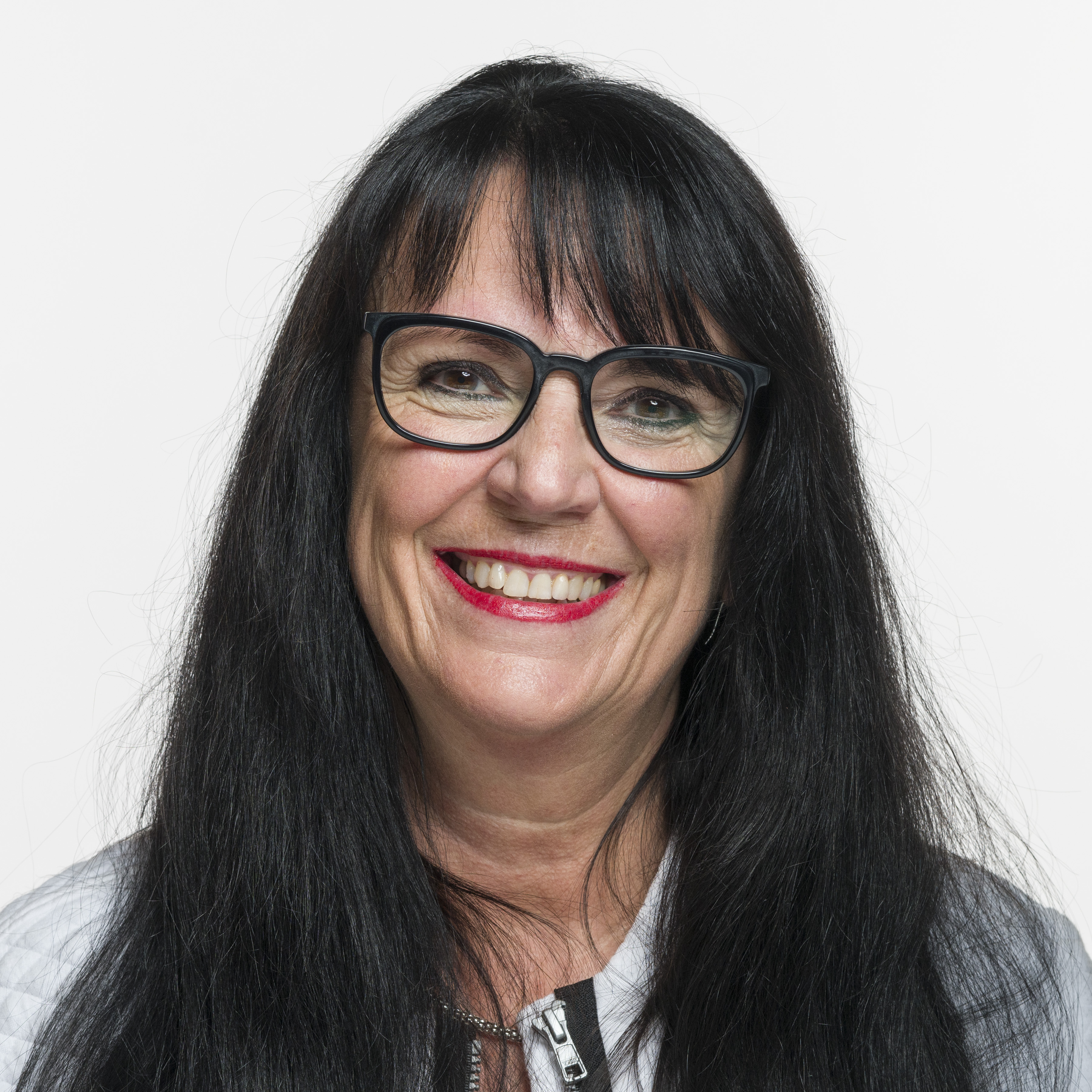

Member of the National Council of Switzerland
- Incumbent
- Assumed office 23 October 2011
- Constituency: Canton of Bern

Leader of the Evangelical People's Party of Switzerland
- Incumbent
- Assumed office 5 April 2014

Personal details
- Born: 17 August 1957 (age 68) Bern, Switzerland
- Party: Evangelical People's Party

Marianne Streiff-Feller (born 17 August 1957) is a Swiss politician who is the leader of the Evangelical People's Party and a member of the National Council.
