= Valérie Piller Carrard =

Swiss politician (born 1978)

Valerie Piller Carrard
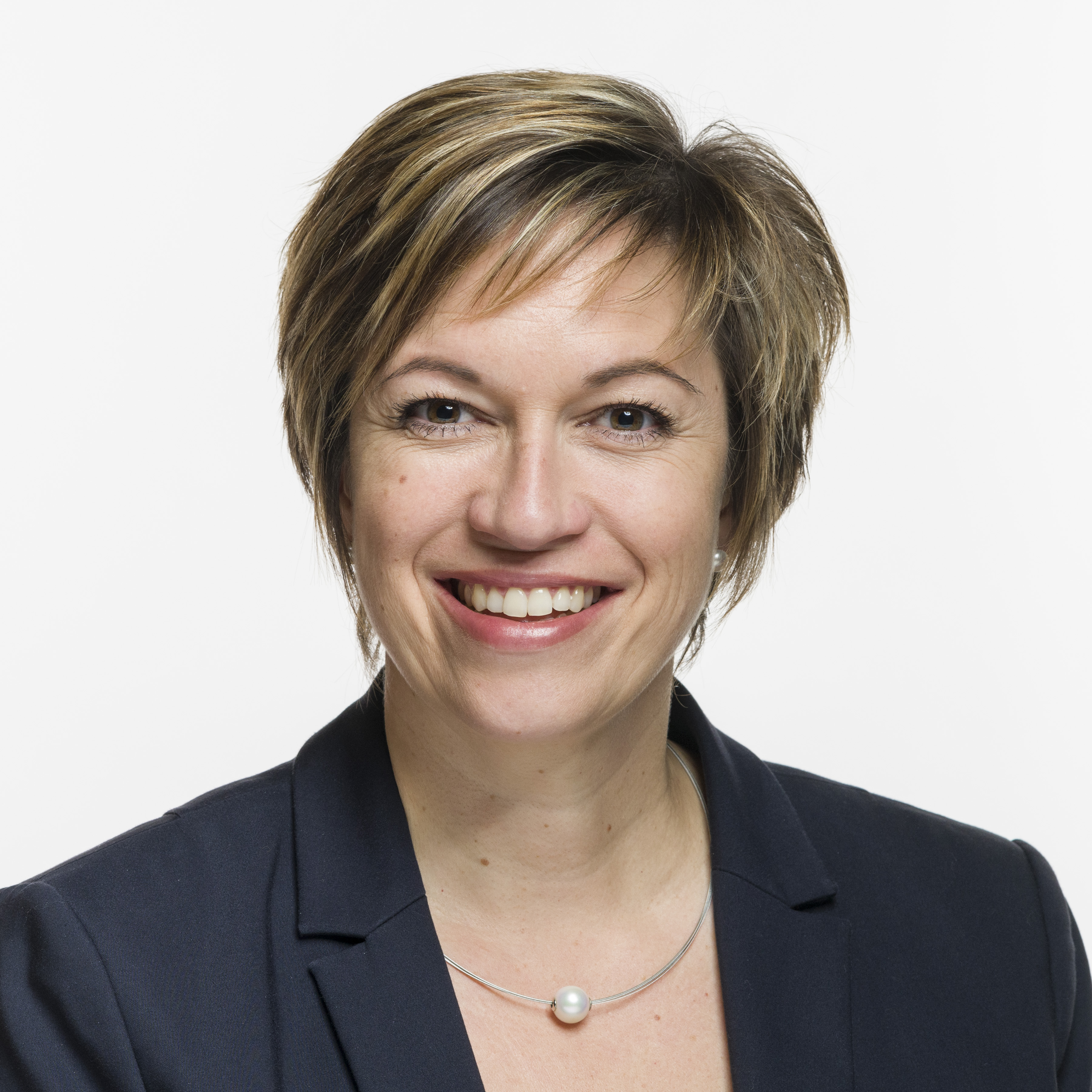

Member of the National Council of Switzerland
- Incumbent
- Assumed office 2011
- Constituency: Canton of Fribourg

Personal details
- Born: 9 September 1978 (age 48) Billens, Fribourg, Switzerland
- Party: Social Democratic Party of Switzerland

Valérie Piller Carrard (born, 9 September 1978) is a Swiss politician of the Social Democratic Party of Switzerland (SP) and a current member of the National Council.

== Professional career ==
For a while she was an accountant at a real estate broker. Today, she is the president of Pro Familia Switzerland, an NGO focused on the welfare of the families.

== Political career ==
Her interest towards politics grew in March 1993, as the National Council refused to elect Christiane Brunner to the Federal Council. She became a member of the Grand Council of Fribourg at the age of twenty-three in 2001, a seat she held until 2011. She was also in the executive council of Gletterens between 2004 and 2009. She was elected into the National Council by a tight margin of twenty-three votes in the Federal Elections in 2011 and was re-elected in 2015 and 2019. In the elections to the Council of State of Fribourg in 2018, she was a candidate, but was not supported by the Green Party, and lost to Didier Castella of the FDP.The Liberals (FDP) in March 2018. In April 2021 she was announced as the candidate for the SP for Cantonal Elections to the Swiss Council of States in November 2021. From 2008 to 2017 she served as the president for the SP in Broye.

=== Political positions ===
She supports a more representative participation of women in politics and in defense of the press freedom she has taken up a Godfatherhood for the imprisoned Belarusian journalist Ala Sharko in April 2021. Concerned about the surging sugar consume of the youth, she advocates for a better guidance through regulations from the state.

== Personal life ==
She is married and has 3 children. Her places of origin are Rechthalten and Font in Estavayer-le-Lac.
