= Élisabeth Baume-Schneider =

Swiss Federal Councillor since 2023

Elisabeth Baume-Schneider
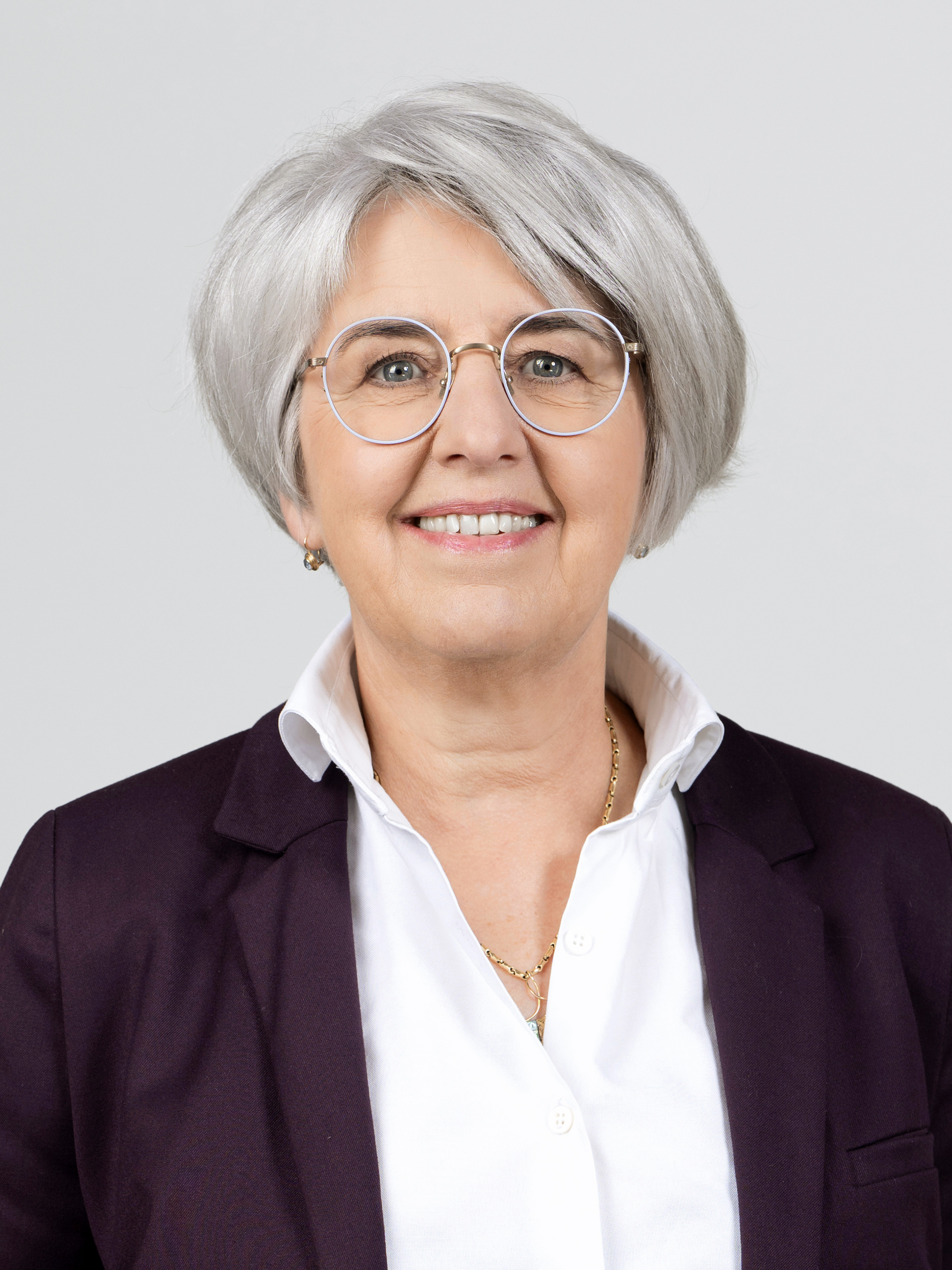
- Official portrait, 2026

Swiss Federal Councillor
- Incumbent
- Assumed office 1 January 2023
- Department: Justice and Police (2023); Home Affairs (2024–present)
- Preceded by: Simonetta Sommaruga

Member of the Swiss Council of States
- Incumbent
- Assumed office 2 December 2019
- Constituency: Jura

Member of the Government of the Canton of Jura
- In office 1 January 2003 – 31 December 2015
- Department: Education (2003–2006); Formation, Culture and Sports (2007–2015)

Personal details
- Born: Elisabeth Schneider; 24 December 1963 (age 62) Saint-Imier, Bern, Switzerland
- Party: Social Democratic Party
- Spouse: Pierre-André Baume
- Children: 2
- Education: University of Neuchâtel

Elisabeth Baume-Schneider (née Schneider; French pronunciation: [elizabɛt bom ʃnajdœʁ, -dɛʁ]; born 24 December 1963) is a Swiss politician who currently serves on the Federal Council for the Social Democratic Party since 2023. She was elected on 7 December 2022, as the first representative of the Canton of Jura.

== Early life and education ==
Elisabeth Baume-Schneider was born Elisabeth Schneider on 24 December 1963 in Saint-Imier, Switzerland, the youngest of three children, to Jean Schneider (1922–2016), a farmer and local politician in Les Bois. Her siblings are; Jean-Claude Schneider and Christiane Heiniger (née Schneider).

Her paternal grandparents were German-speaking from the Bernese Seeland. During her childhood she hated the Bernese dialect spoken at home. In the 1980s, her parents lost their farm, Les Mûrs, due to the construction of a golf course.

She graduated from high school in La Chaux-de-Fonds in 1983 and following she studied social sciences at the University of Neuchâtel. She obtained a licentiate in 1987. Between 1989 and 2002 she worked as a social worker in Franches-Montagnes and later for the cantonal administration of Jura.

== Political career ==
In her early political career, she was influenced by the Polish Solidarnosc, her involvement at the Amnesty International and in the Socialist Workers Party, before she eventually joined the Social Democratic Party (SP). in 1995 she became a member of the Parliament of Jura over which she presided in 2000. Between December 2002 and 2015 she was a member of the government of the Canton of Jura in which she acted as the minister of education culture and sports. As such she was elected as the president of the strategic committee of the Haute École Arc. As an Executive Councilor of Jura, she was involved in the negotiations in transferring Moutier from the majority German speaking Canton Berne to Jura which is a majority francophone canton. She also instituted the bilingual high school exam in the canton.

In the federal elections of 2019, Baume-Schneider was elected to the Council of States. In January 2020 she was elected to the advisory council of the Fachhochschule. In November 2022, she announced her candidacy to the Federal Council of Switzerland.

=== Federal Councilor ===
On the 7 December 2022, she was elected to the federal council, replacing the previous, retiring federal councillor for the SP, Simonetta Sommaruga. She is the first member of the federal council from the canton of Jura, the youngest of the Swiss cantons. Her election was controversial, as it meant that the German-speaking part of Switzerland, which constitutes the majority of the Swiss population, was now underrepresented in the federal council, with only 3 of the 7 councillors hailing from this region. She was assigned to the Federal Departement of Justice and Police in succession of fellow Federal Councillor Karin Keller-Sutter who became the head of the Federal Department of Finance.

== Personal life ==
Baume-Schneider married Pierre-André Baume (born 1966) with whom she has two children. They reside on a farm where she keeps Blacknose sheep.

Political offices
Preceded by Simonetta Sommaruga	Member of the Swiss Federal Council; 2023–present	Incumbent
Preceded by Karin Keller-Sutter	Head of the Department of Justice and Police; 2023	Succeeded by Beat Jans
Preceded by Didier Burkhalter	Head of the Department of Home Affairs; 2024–present	Incumbent
