= Judith Bellaiche =

Swiss politician

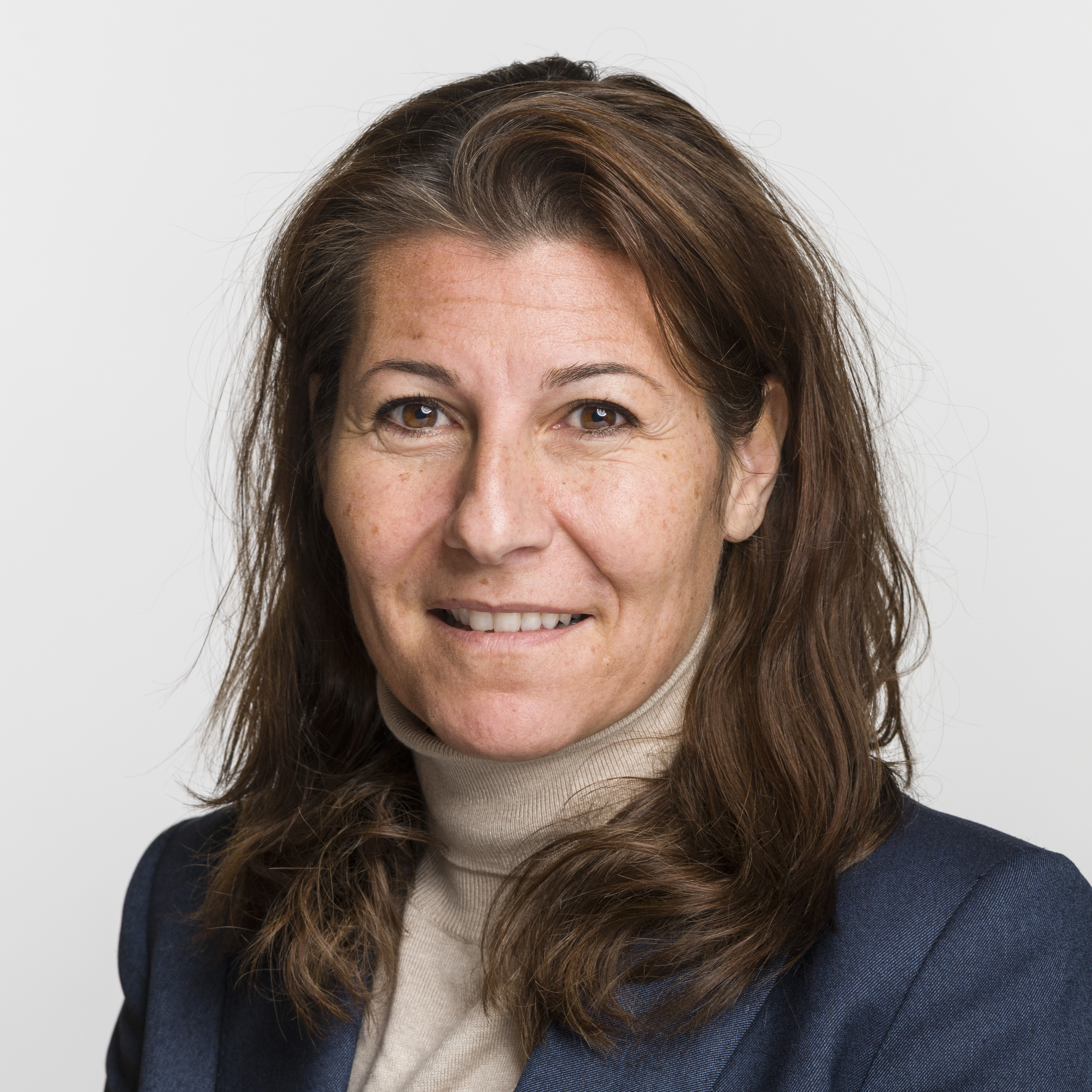
- Bellaïche in 2019

Member of the National Council
- In office 2019–2023
- Constituency: Canton of Zürich

Personal details
- Born: 2 February 1971 (age 55) Lille, France
- Citizenship: Switzerland; France
- Party: Green Liberal Party
- Education: University of Basel (Lic.); University of St Gallen (MBA)
- Occupation: Lawyer, businesswoman

Judith Sarah Jäger Bellaiche (born 2 February 1971, Lille, France) is a Swiss lawyer, Green Liberal Party politician who served as a member of the National Council from 2019 to 2023. She is the managing director of Swico trade association.

== Education ==
Bellaiche studied Law at the University of Basel and an Executive MBA in General Management at the University of St Gallen. She began a career in finance where she worked for several years before co-founding a business.

== Political career ==
Bellaiche began her political career in her local community as an elected councilor in Kilchberg, Zürich where she served for 8 years. She headed building construction, real estate and planning department. In 2011, she was elected to the Zürich Cantonal Council where she was a member of Intergroup Conference from 2015 to 2019 and a member of WAK Commission for Economy and Taxes. She was elected to the National Council in 2019.
