= 2023 Swiss Federal Council election =

← 2019 (regular) ← 2022 (by-)	13 December 2023	2027 (regular) → 2025 (by-) →

All 7 Federal Councillors
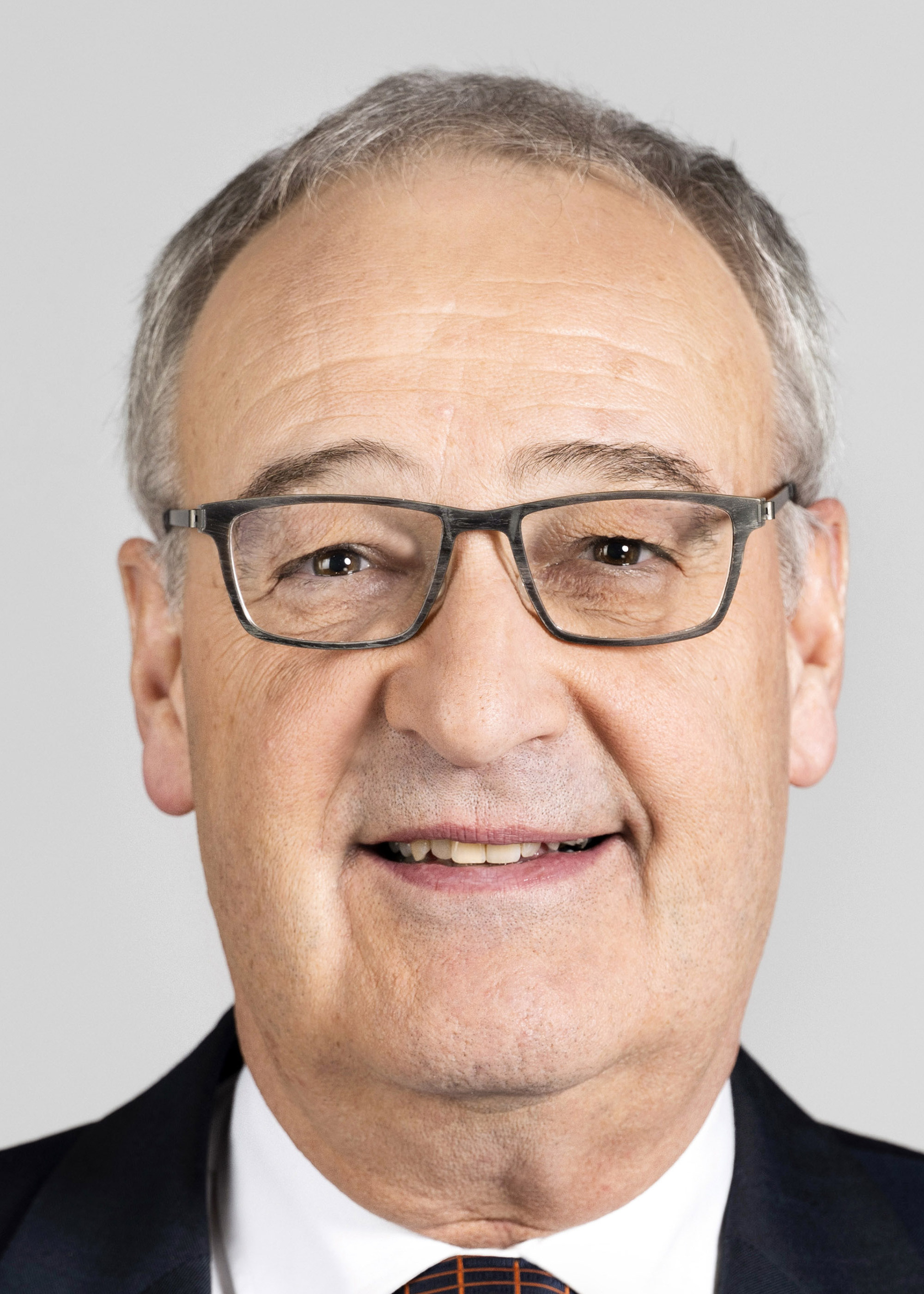

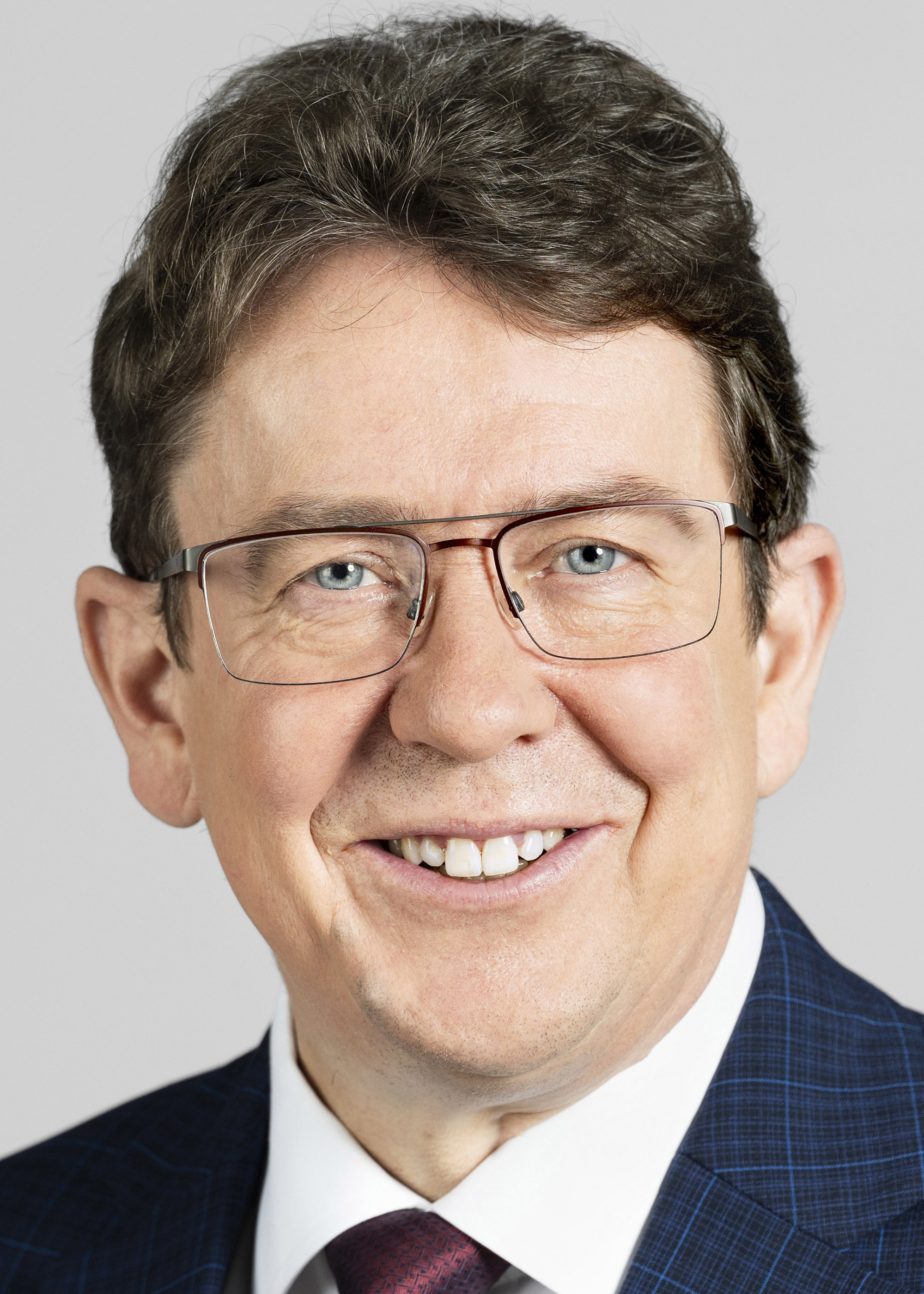

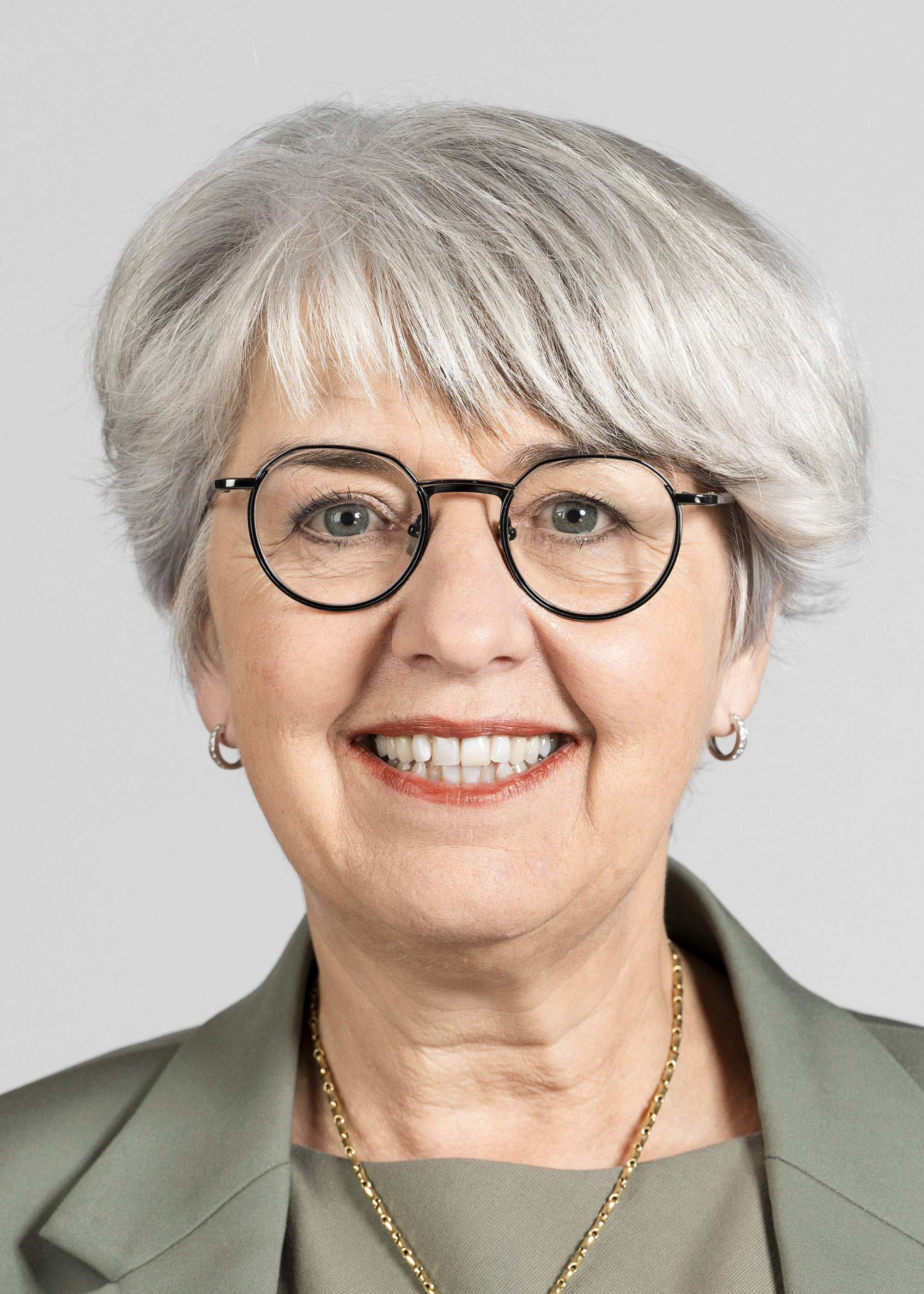

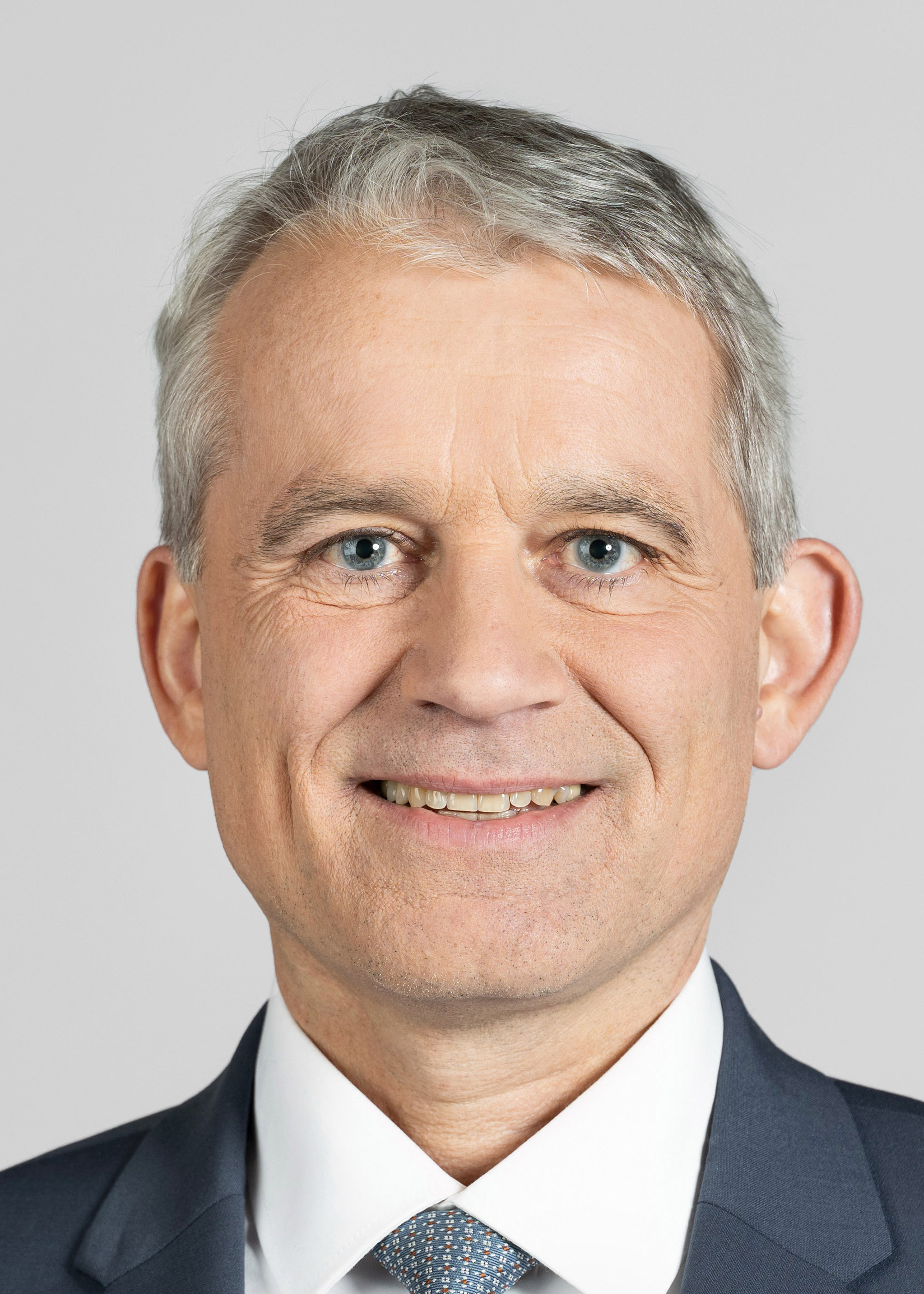

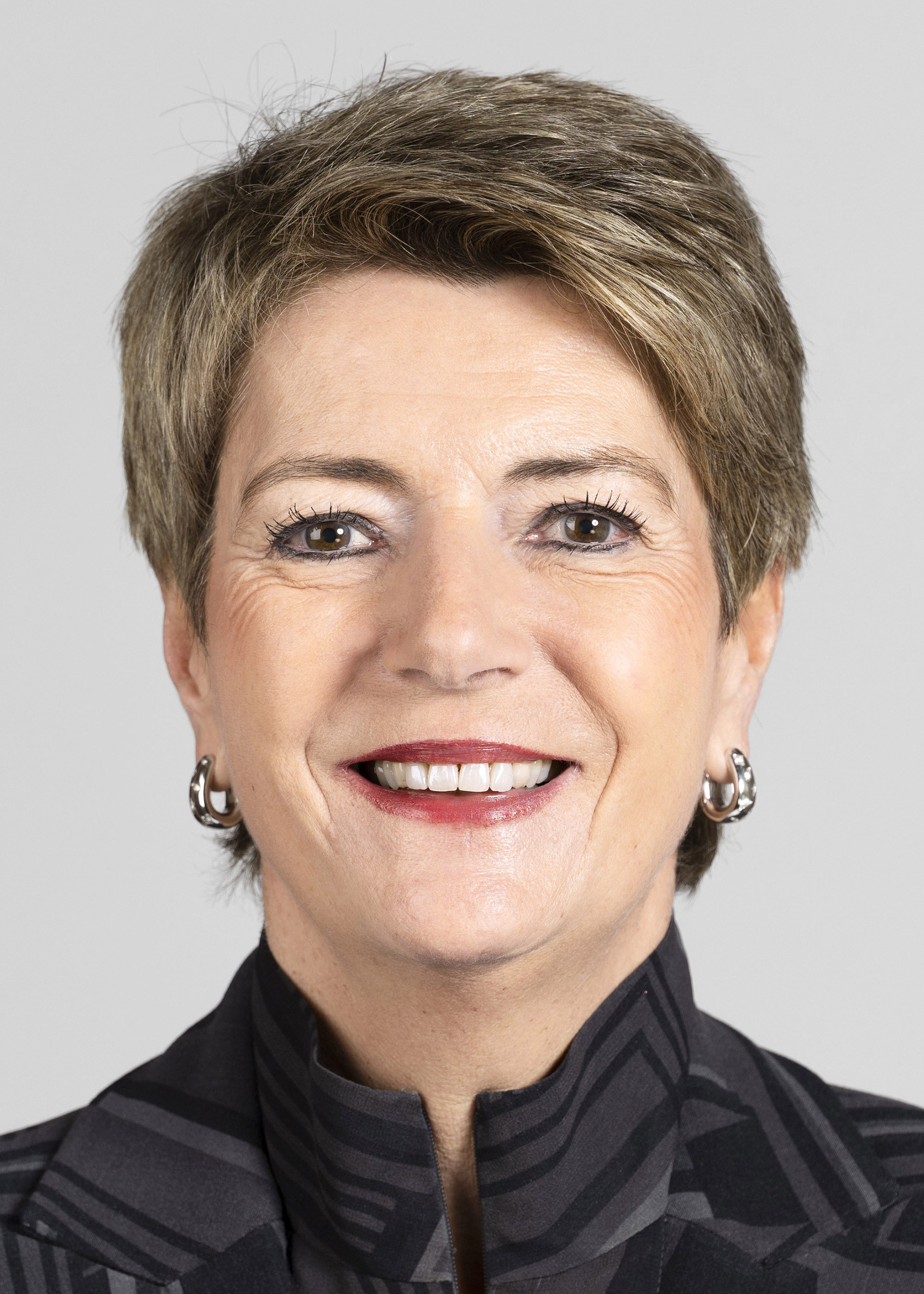

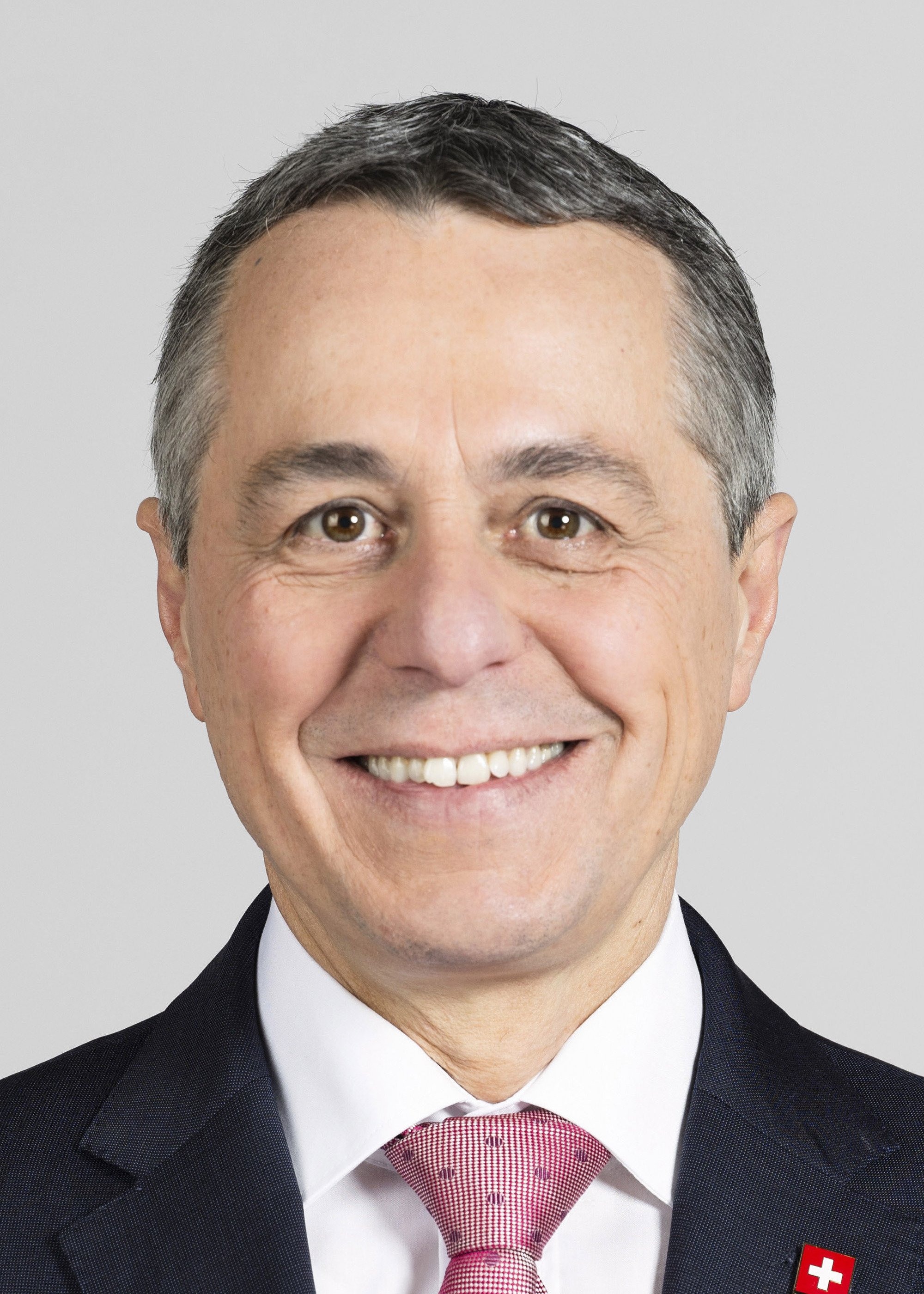

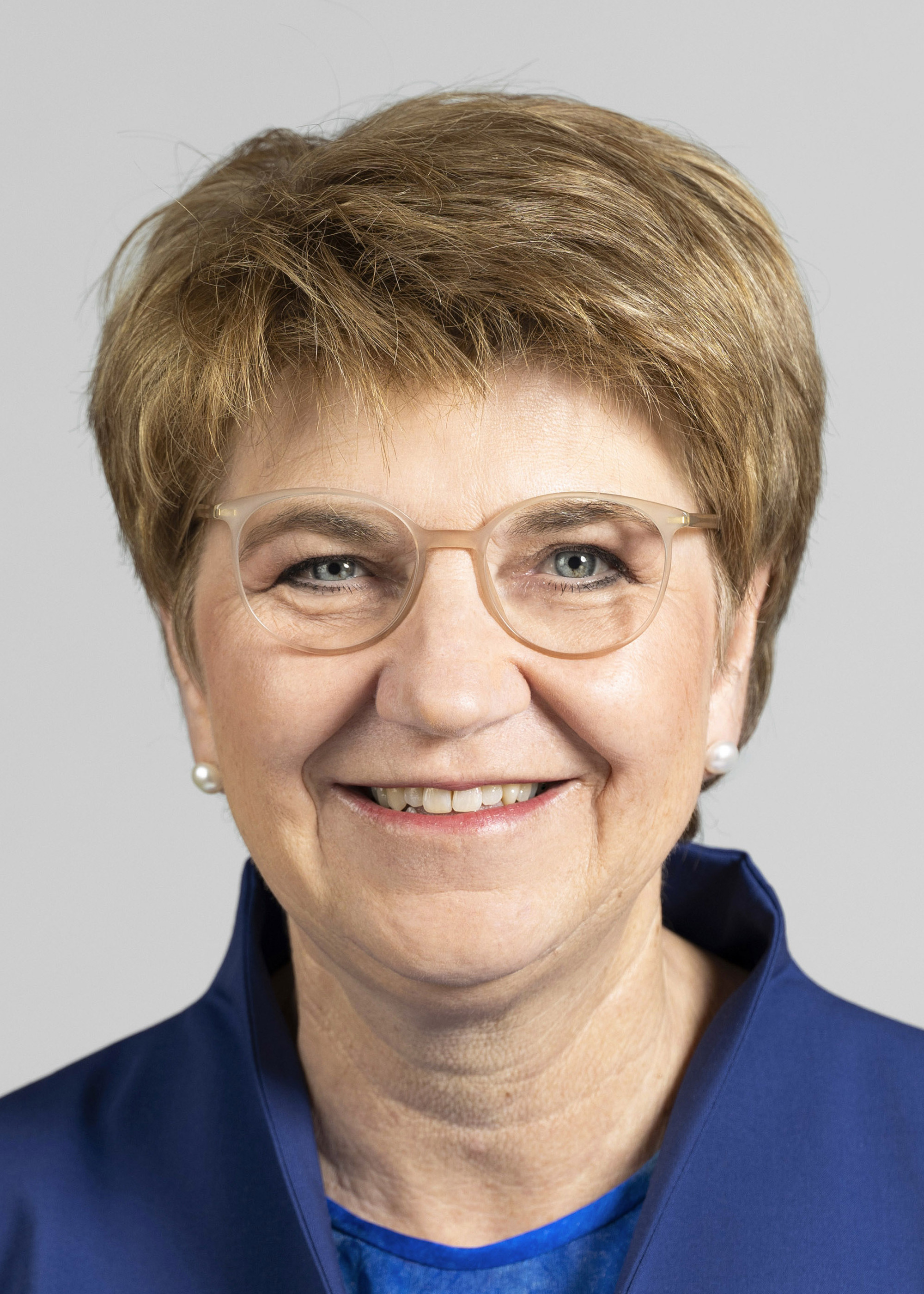
	First party	Second party
Party	Swiss People's	Social Democrats
Elected	Guy Parmelin; 215 votes	Élis. Baume-Schneider; 151 votes
	Albert Rösti; 189 votes	Beat Jans; 134 votes
	Third party	Fourth party
Party	FDP.The Liberals	The Centre
Elected	Karin Keller-Sutter; 176 votes	Viola Amherd; 201 votes
	Ignazio Cassis; 167 votes

An election for all seven members of the Federal Council, Switzerland's government, were held on 13 December 2023 for the 2024–2028 term. It followed the federal election held a month earlier and partly depended on its results.

All Federal Councillors except Alain Berset were running for re-election. Per an informal agreement between the political parties known as the magic formula, incumbents are traditionally left unopposed and open seats are only contested by the incumbent's party, ensuring the partisan balance. The federal assembly elected Beat Jans to replace Alain Berset after three rounds of voting. All other councillors were re-elected.

Elections for President of the Swiss Confederation and Vice President of the Federal Council, as well as for Chancellor of Switzerland, also took place; Federal Councillor Viola Amherd was elected president for the year 2024 following an informal rotation agreement. After the election the federal departements were reshuffled. The Federal Department of Home Affairs (formerly led by Alain Berset) is now being led by Élisabeth Baume-Schneider, whose former department, the Federal Department of Justice and Police, is now being led by newly-elected Beat Jans.

== Background ==
In Switzerland, the 7-seat executive Federal Council is elected by the Federal Assembly (both chambers of the legislature sitting together); in practice it is apportioned between the parties following the unwritten agreement known as the "magic formula". The formula was followed from 1959 to 2003 and in a different composition between 2003 and 2007 and again since 2015. Since 2016 the composition has been: SVP 2 seats, SP 2 seats, FDP 2 seats, and Die Mitte (succeeding the CVP) 1 seat.

Federal councillors are traditionally re-elected until they step down; only four have ever lost re-election. Councillors tend to stand down during their term in order to ensure their party retains their seat and to allow their party to get more visibility at a moment other than shortly after a general election. These by-elections were held only ten months before the 2023 federal election.

On 21 June 2023, a few days after the results of the June referendums, social-democratic councillor Alain Berset announced he would resign effective 31 December, after serving for 12 years. He described the referendum of the amendment to the COVID-19 Act as an end to "the Covid cycle", which defined his third term as head of the Federal Department of Home Affairs. Following the existing precedent, only SP candidates were expected to stand for his seat.

In the previous Federal Council elections in 2022 when Simonetta Sommaruga resigned, her party, the SP chose to only nominate women as to ensure that the gender balance on the council would not be disturbed. Daniel Jositsch who had previously announced to run in 2022, then had to retract his candidacy but nevertheless received a significant number of protest votes. During that election, he did not publicly encourage the federal assembly to not vote for him, which has been criticised by members of his party. Jositsch again stood for the nomination in 2023. After not being chosen, there was speculation that he would again receive protest votes, possibly even being elected in spite of not being nominated by his party.

Moreover, the Green party called the distribution of the Federal Council into question as they had previously done in 2019 on the ground that the right-wing parties SVP and FDP were in a majority on the Federal Council but had lost that majority in the federal assembly. Hence, they announced they would attack an unspecified seat of the FDP. While the SP shared the greens point of view, they did not officially support the green bid due to the other parties announcing that if the green candidate were to be elected the other parties would not support the official candidates of the SP in the election to succeed Alain Berset, which was to happen after the other members election.

The retirement of Alain Berset left the position of head of the Federal Department of Home Affairs open for the first time since 2011.

=== Electoral system ===
A person is elected if they receive an absolute majority of the valid votes cast. If no one receives an absolute majority the voting proceeds via an exhaustive ballot, each seat being filled independently. The order in which the seats are filled is the order of seniority of the members of the council standing for re-election and then the vacant seats (in order of seniority of the councillors that previously held these now vacant seats). In the first two rounds members of the Federal Assembly can vote for anyone eligible, but only those receiving at least ten votes are announced in the results; from the third round onwards only candidates who received at least ten votes in one of the first two rounds are eligible, the last-placed candidate is eliminated until someone reaches an overall majority. The ballots are cast in secret.

== Federal Assembly ==
The composition of the Federal Assembly will depend on the composition of the National Council and Council of States after the 2023 Swiss federal election.

Parliamentary group	Parties	NR	SR	Total	%
Group of the Swiss People's Party	SVP, Lega, EDU, MCG	67	7	74	30.1%
Social Democratic group	SP	41	9	50	20.3%
The Centre group. The Centre. EVP	DM, EVP	31	15	46	18.7%
FDP-Liberal group	FDP	28	11	39	15.8%
Green group	GPS	23	3	26	10.6%
Green Liberal group	GLP	10	1	11	4.5%

== Candidates for the Federal Council ==
=== Incumbents ===
Incumbents, in descending order of seniority, including political party affiliation and department at the time of the election:

- Alain Berset (SP-FR) since 2012, head of the Federal Department of Home Affairs (not running for re-election),
- Guy Parmelin (SVP-VD) since 2016, head of the Federal Department of Economic Affairs, Education and Research,
- Ignazio Cassis (FDP-TI) since 2017, head of the Federal Department of Foreign Affairs,
- Viola Amherd (DM-VS) since 2019, head of the Federal Department of Defence, Civil Protection and Sport,
- Karin Keller-Sutter (FDP-SG) since 2019, head of the Federal Department of Finance,
- Albert Rösti (SVP-BE) since 2023, head of the Federal Department of Environment, Transport, Energy and Communications,
- Élisabeth Baume-Schneider (SP-JU) since 2023, head of the Federal Department of Justice and Police.
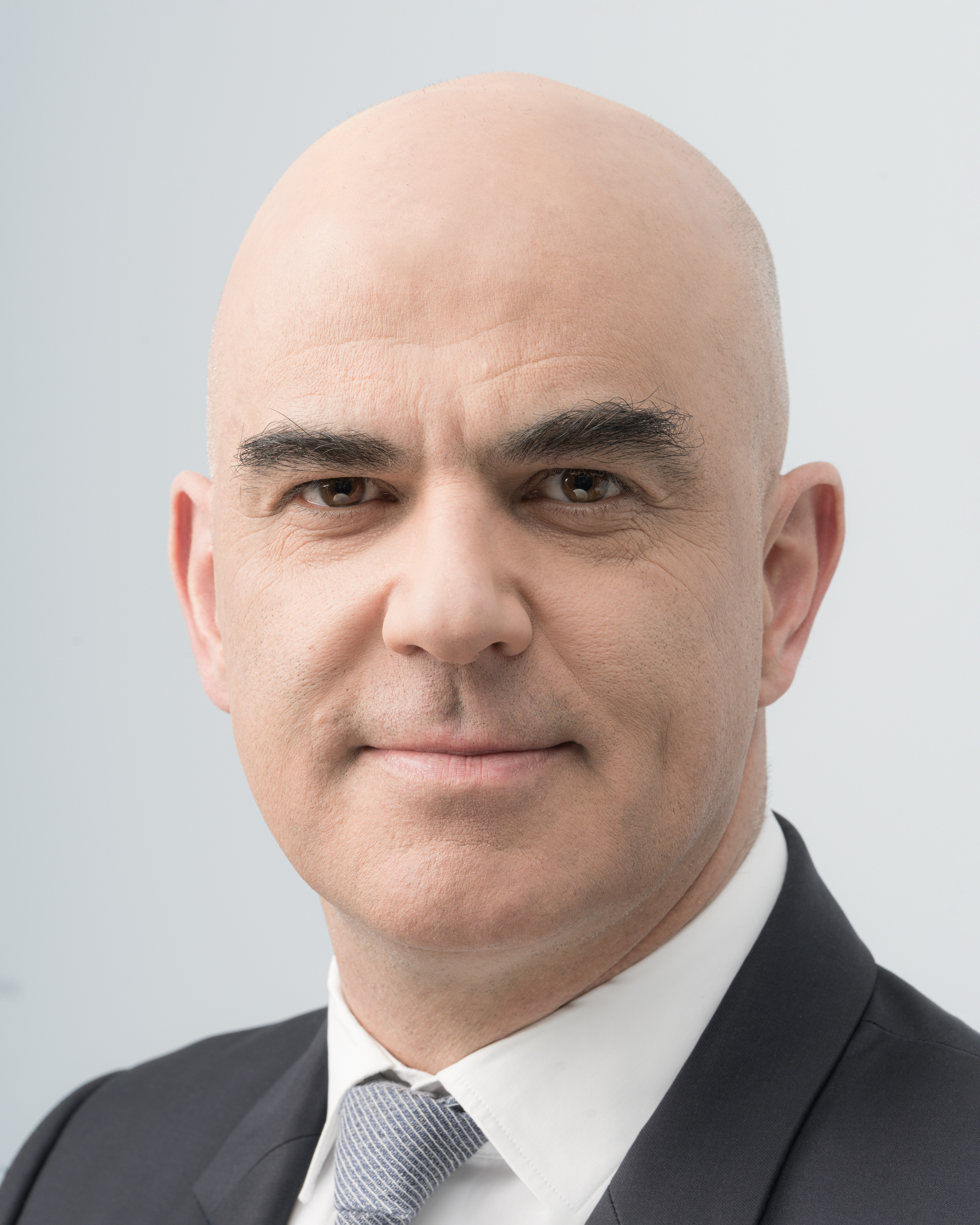
Federal councillor
Alain Berset
from Fribourg
(Retiring)

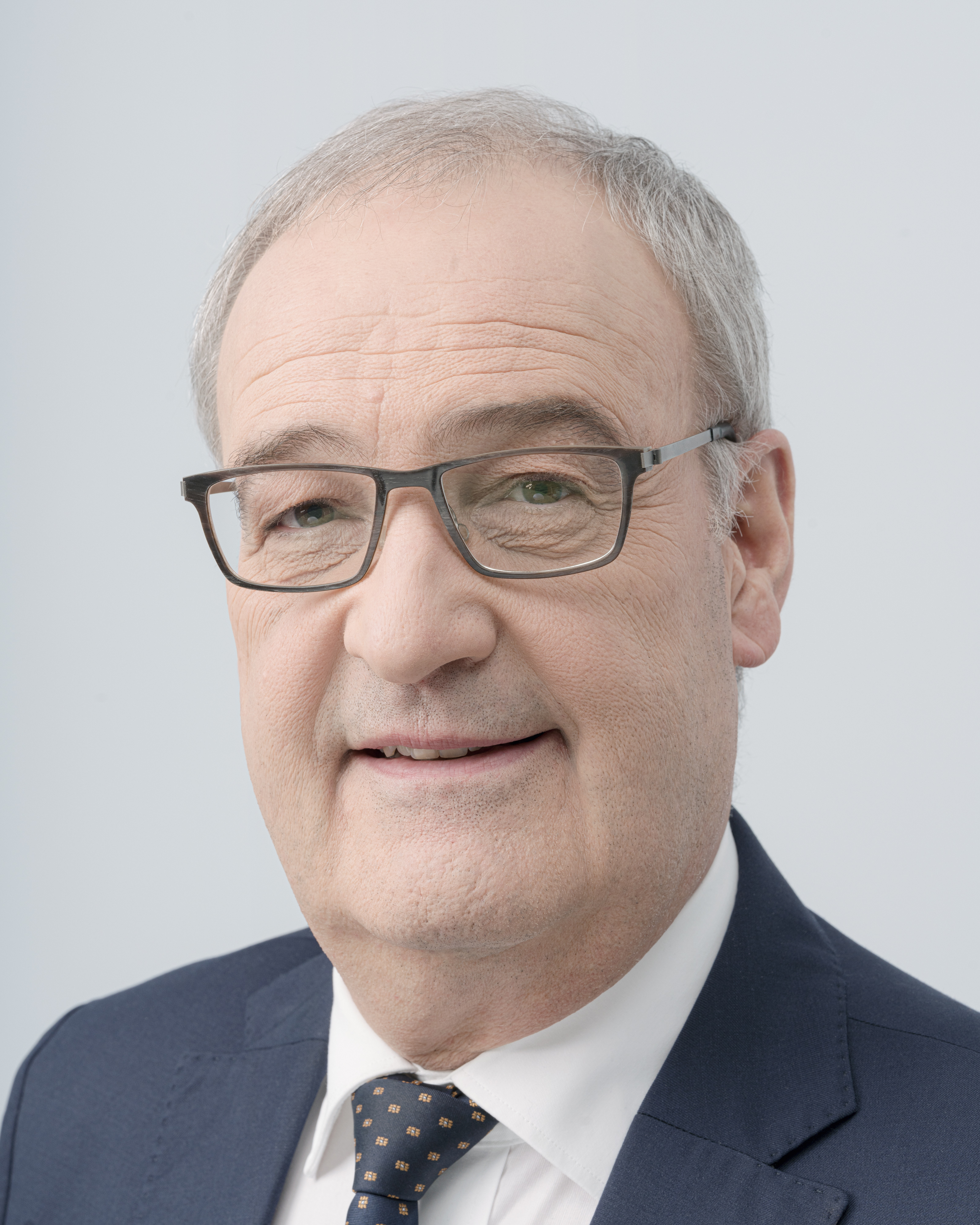
Federal councillor
Guy Parmelin
from Vaud

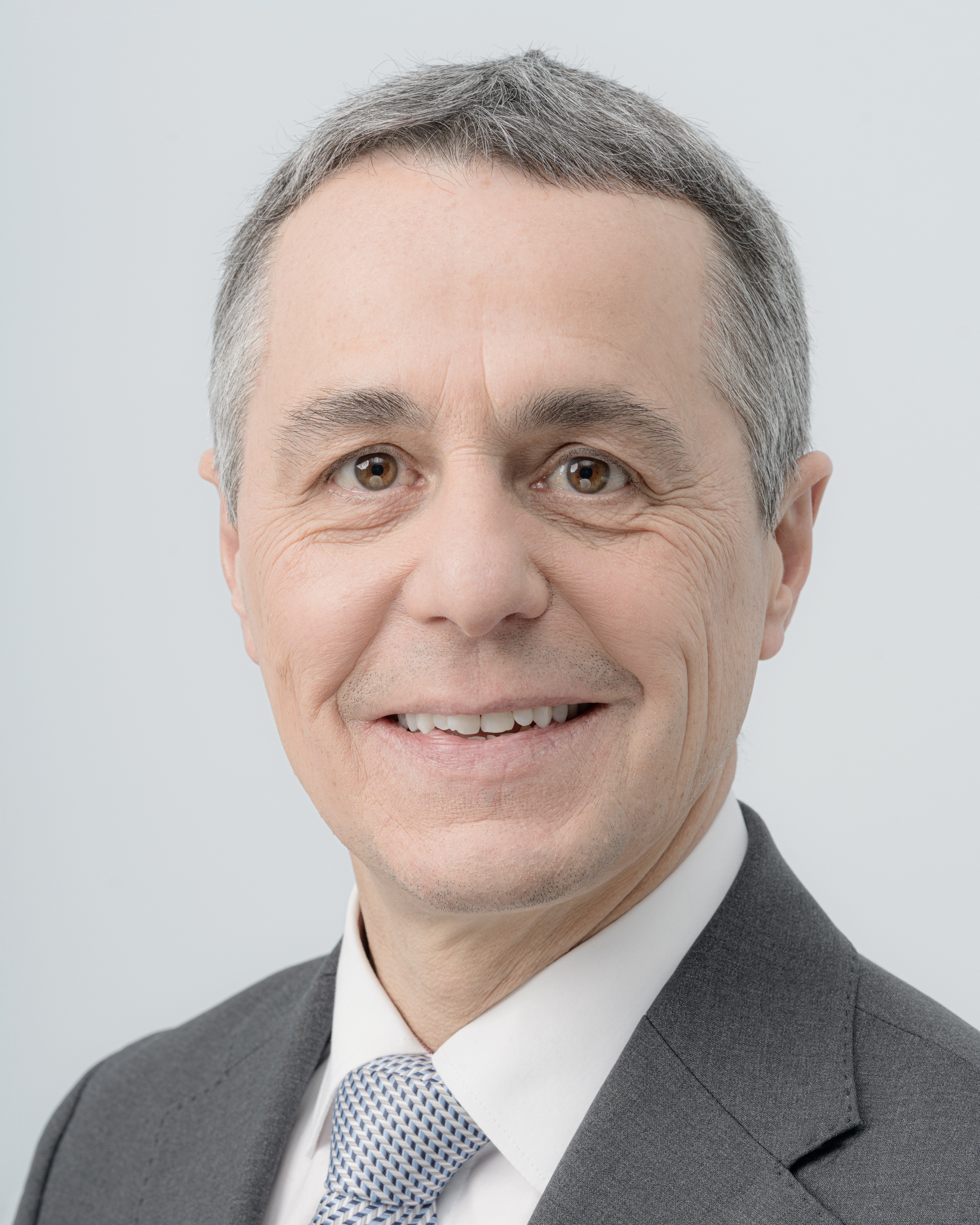
Federal councillor
Ignazio Cassis
from Ticino

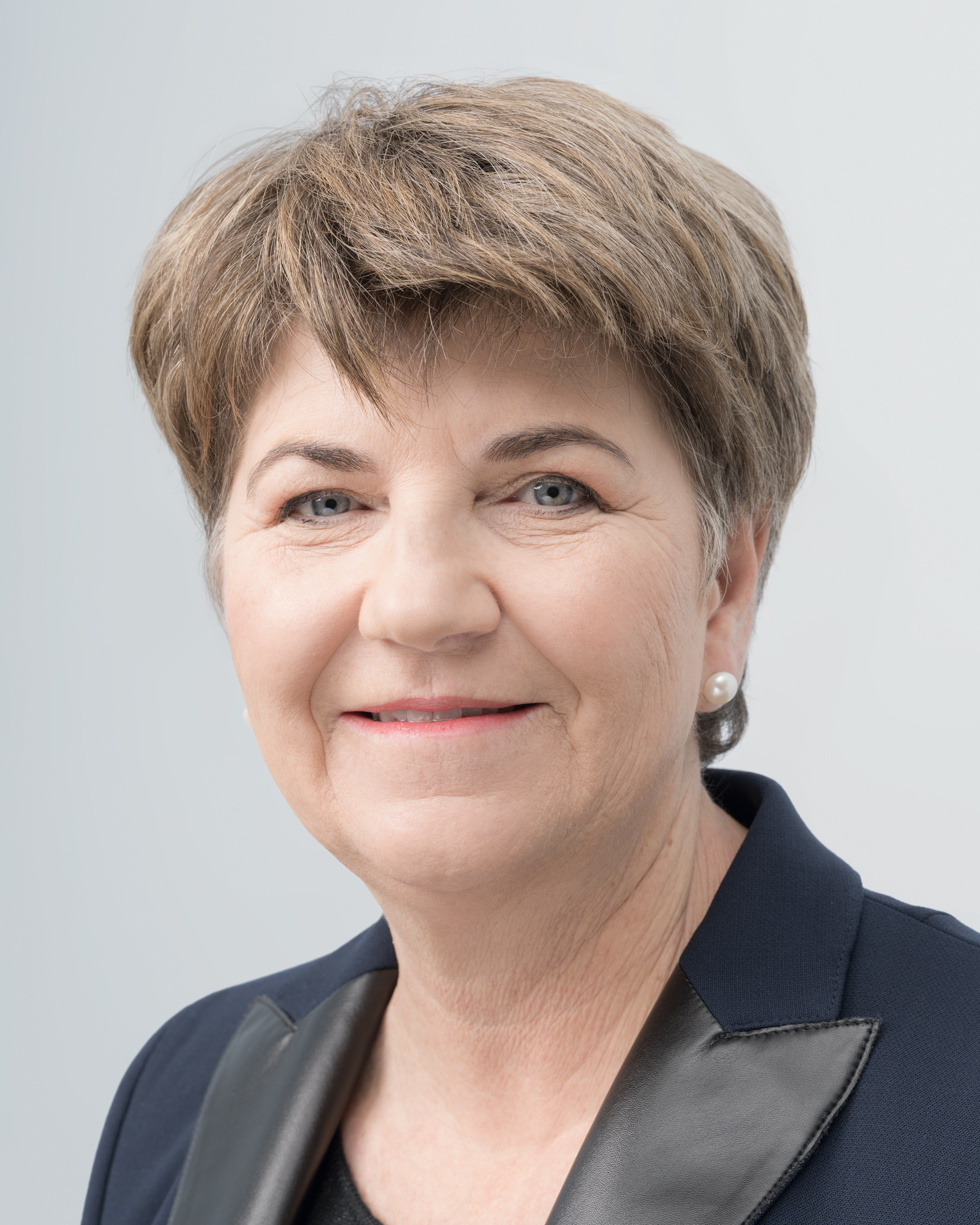
Federal councillor
Viola Amherd
from Valais

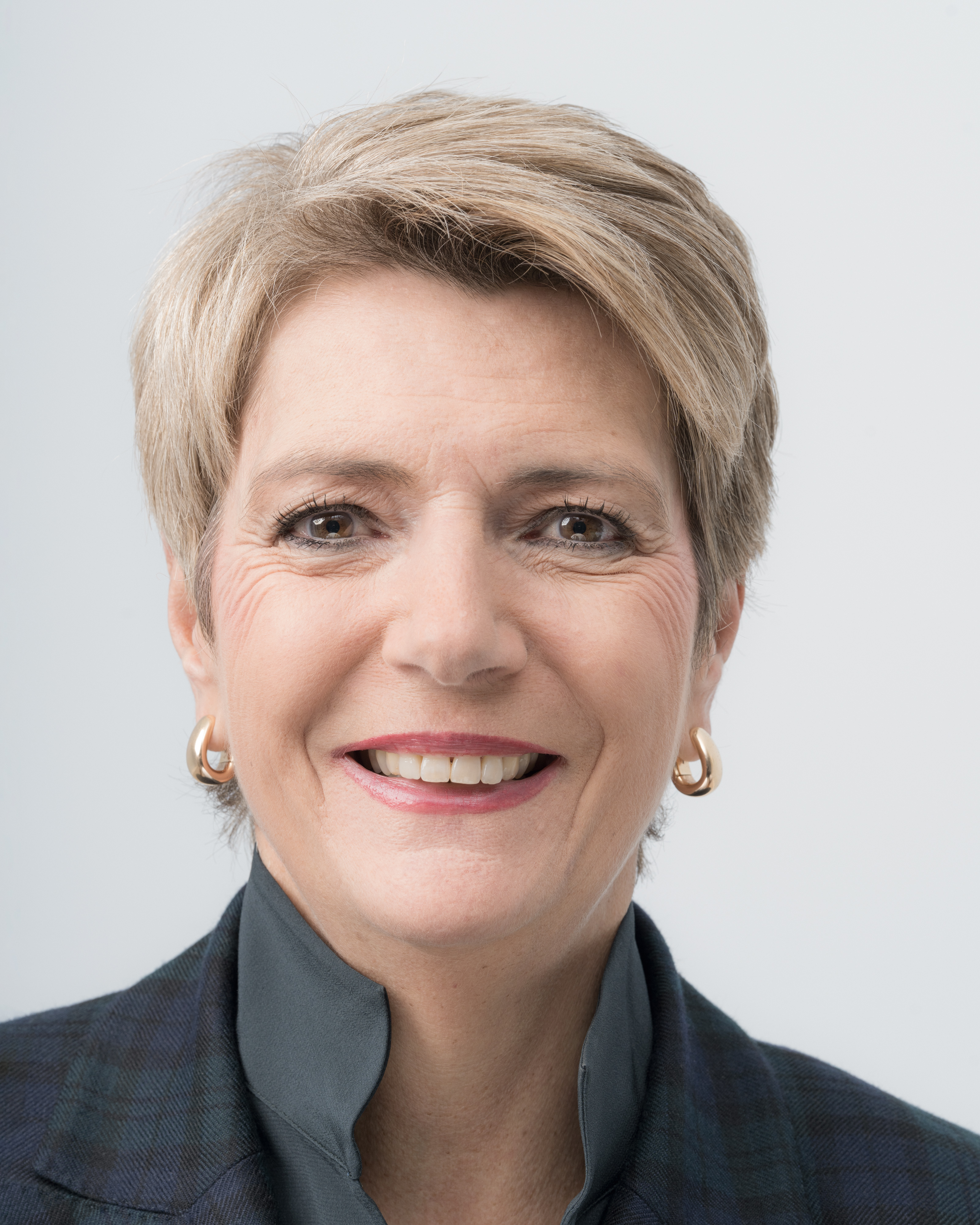
Federal councillor
Karin Keller-Sutter
from St. Gallen

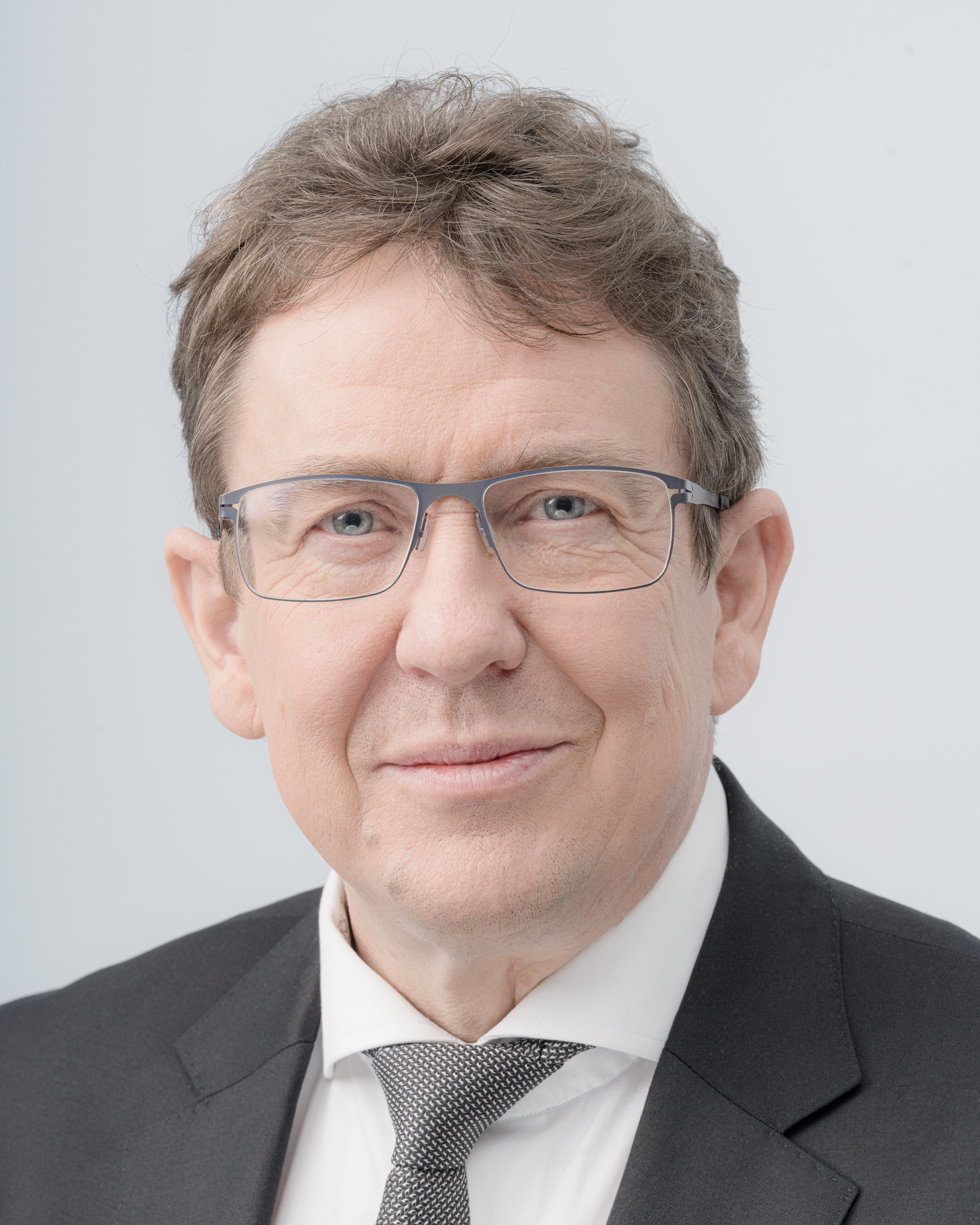
Federal councillor
Albert Rösti
from Bern

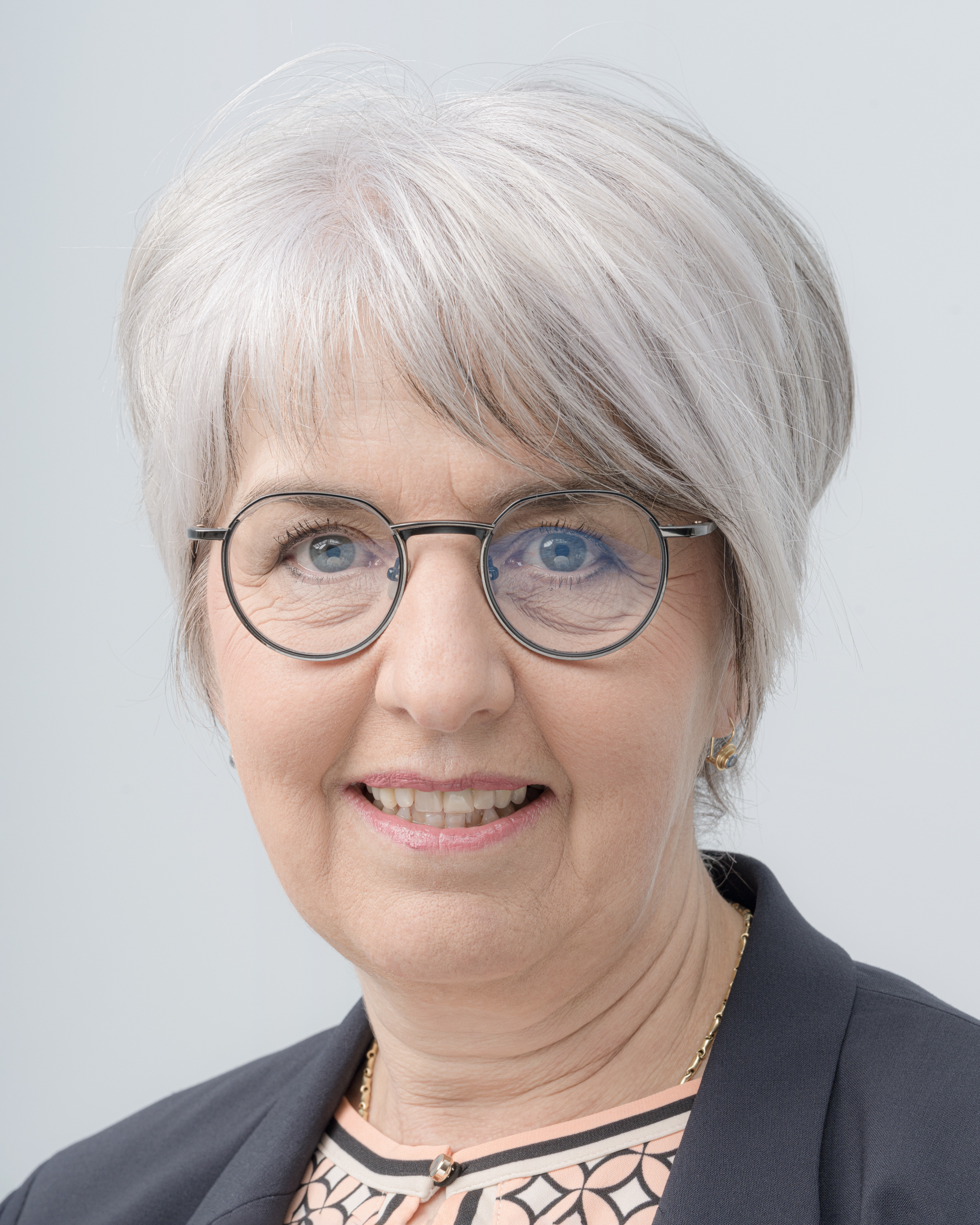
Federal councillor
Élisabeth Baume-Schneider
from Jura

=== Candidates to Berset's seat ===
==== Declared ====
The following individuals had announced their candidacy:

- Matthias Aebischer (SP-BE), national councillor for Bern (2011–present)
- Evi Allemann (SP-BE), Bern executive councillor (2018–present)
- Beat Jans (SP-BS), Basel-Stadt executive councillor (2021–present), former national councillor for Basel-Stadt (2010–2020), former Basel-Stadt cantonal councillor (2001–2011)
- Daniel Jositsch (SP-ZH), states councillor from Zurich (2015–present), former national councillor for Zurich (2007–2015), candidate to the Federal Council in 2022
- Roger Nordmann (SP-VD), national councillor for Vaud (2004–present)
- Jon Pult (SP-GR), national councillor for Grisons (2019–present), former Grisons cantonal councillor (2010–2018), Official SP/PS Nominee on Party ticket

Beat Jans and Jon Pult have been officially nominated by their party on a ticket to fill the seat vacancy created by Alain Berset.

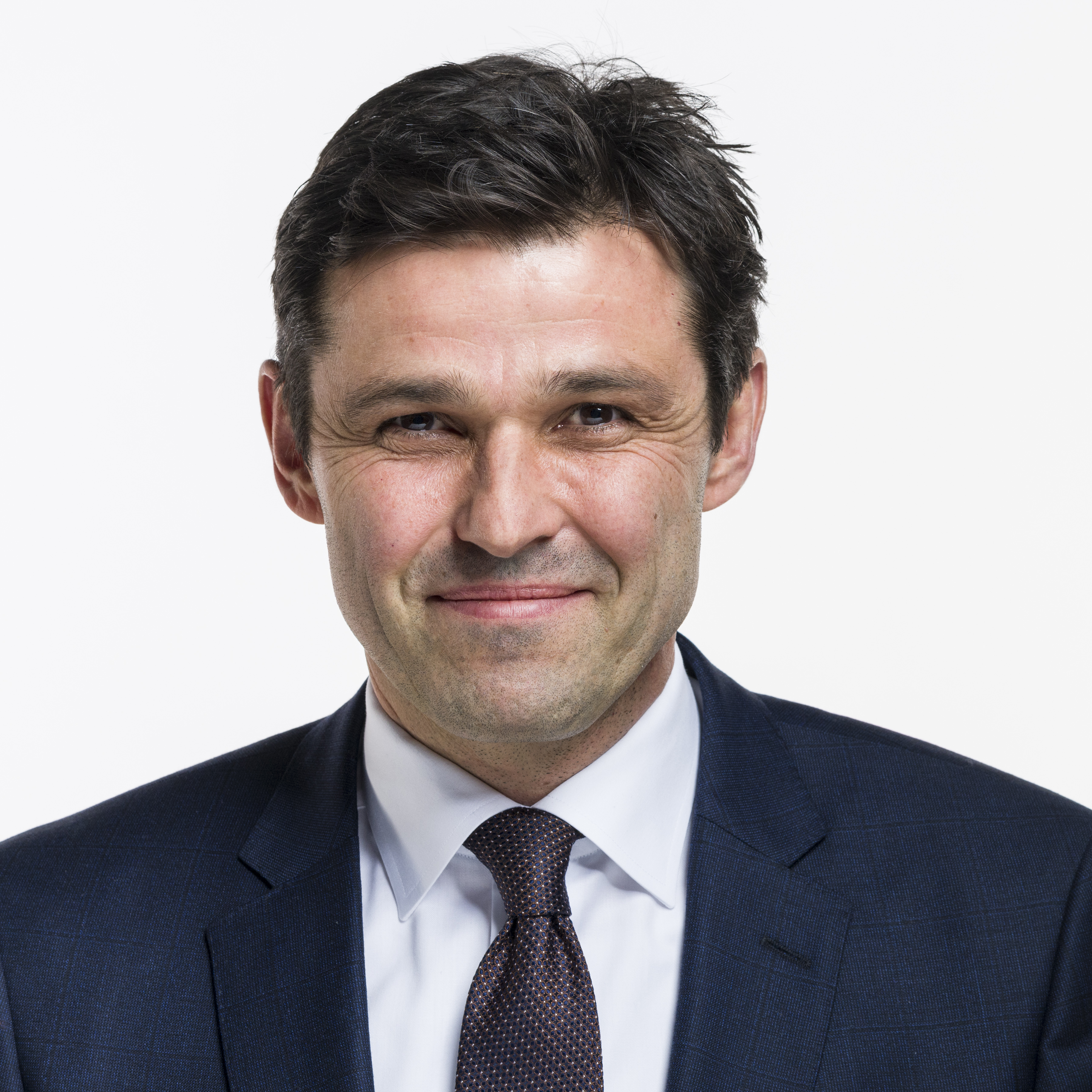
National councillor
Matthias Aebischer
from Bern

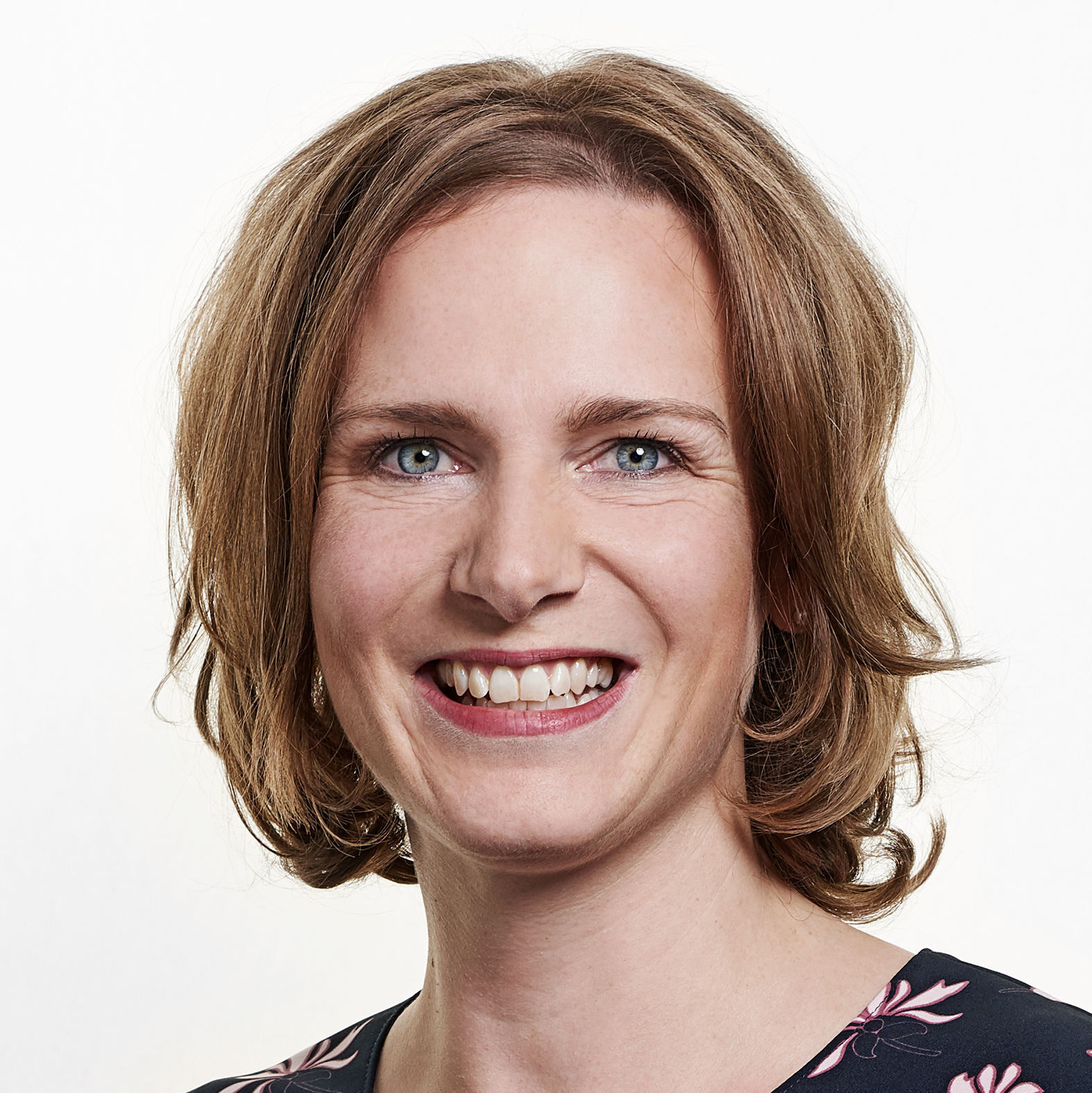
Executive councillor
Evi Allemann
of Bern

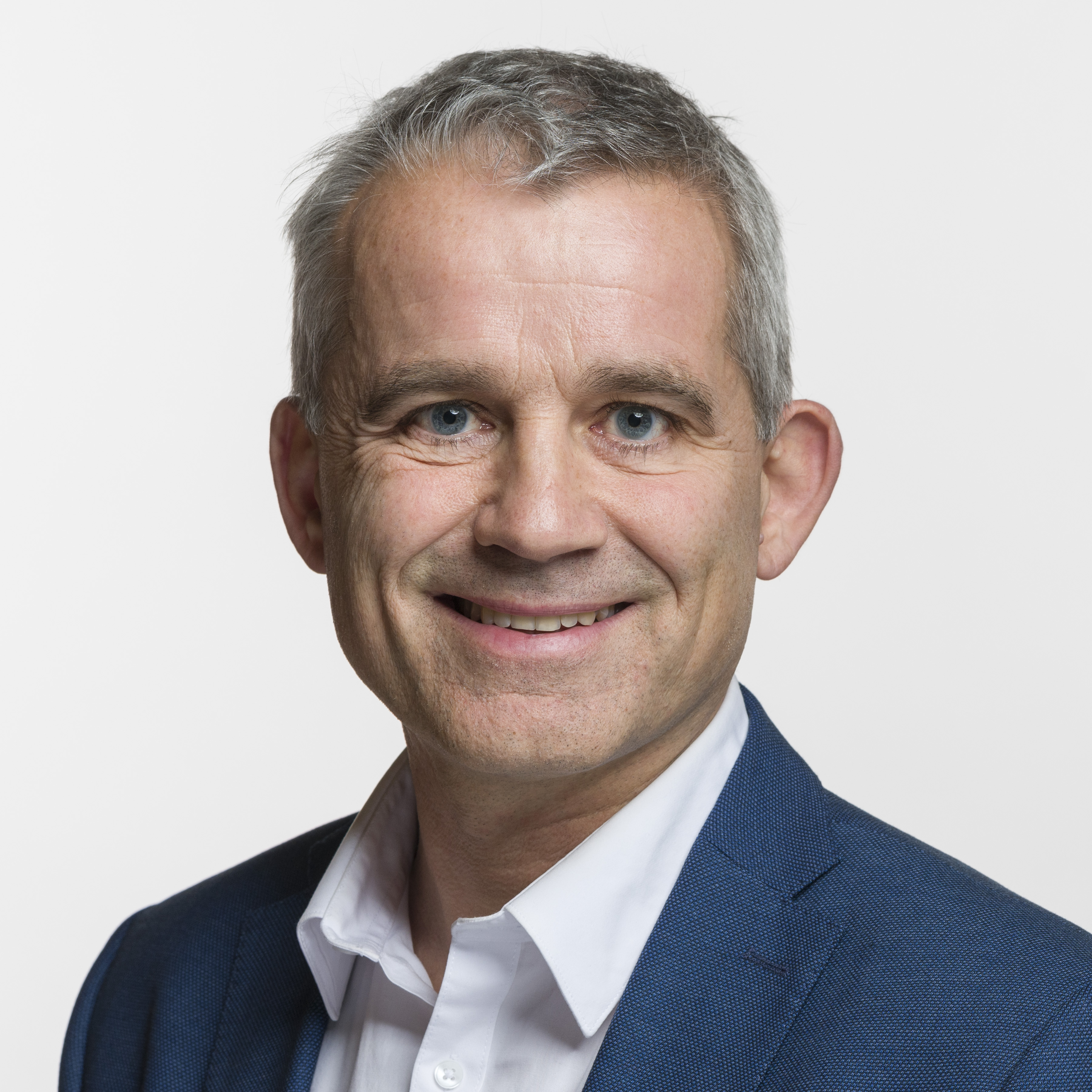
Executive councillor
Beat Jans
of Basel-Stadt
(Official SP/PS Nominee)

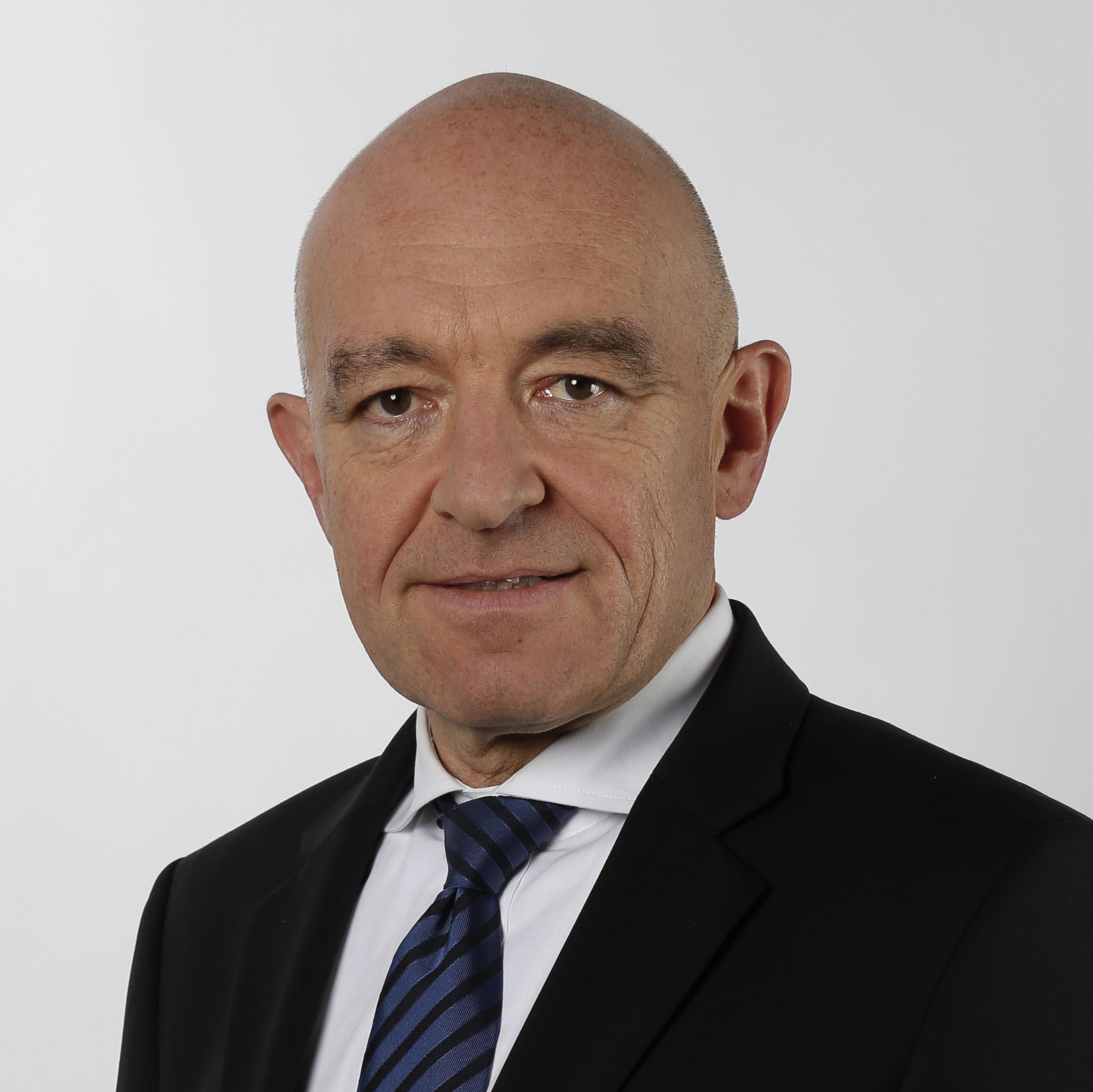
States councillor
Daniel Jositsch
from Zurich

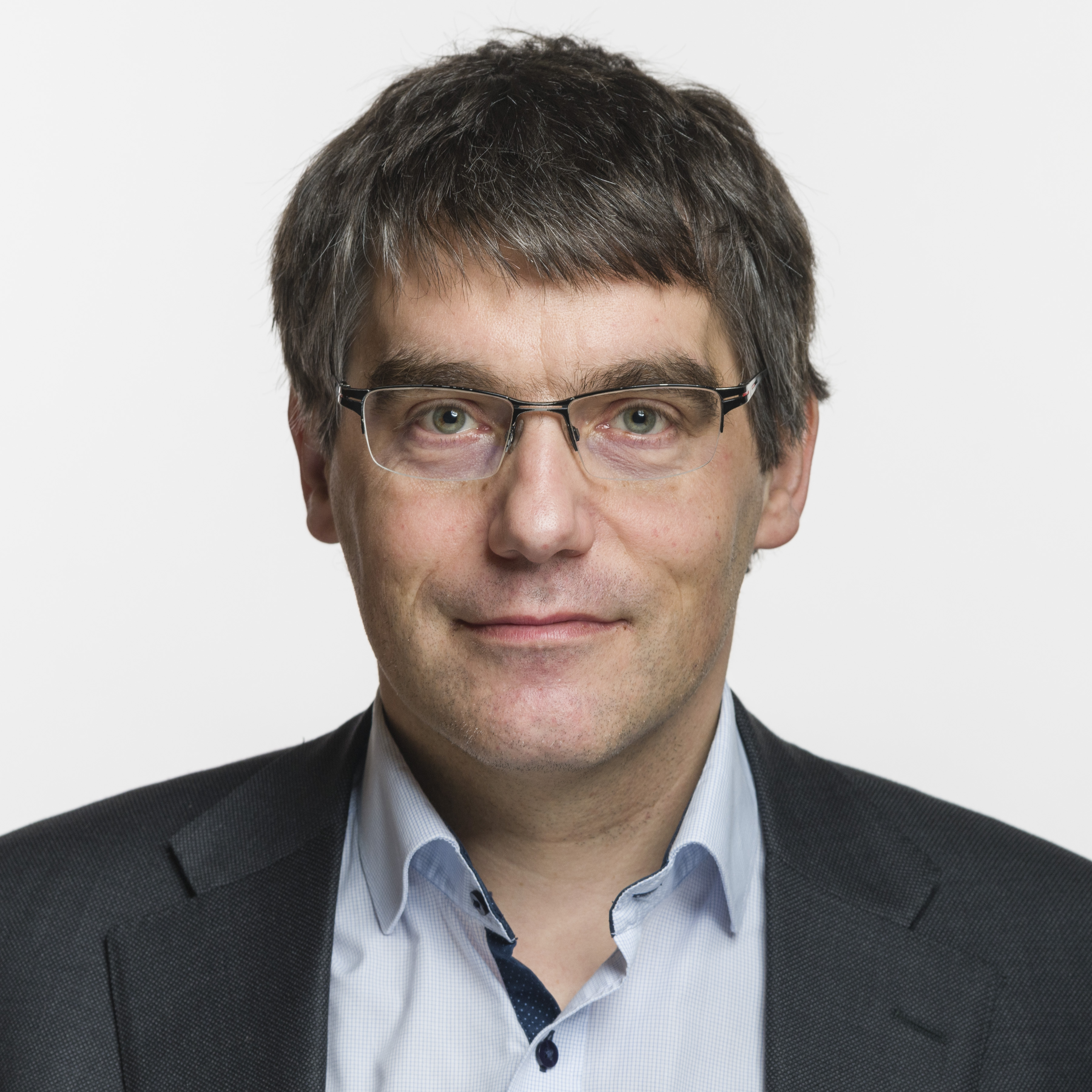
National councillor
Roger Nordmann
from Vaud

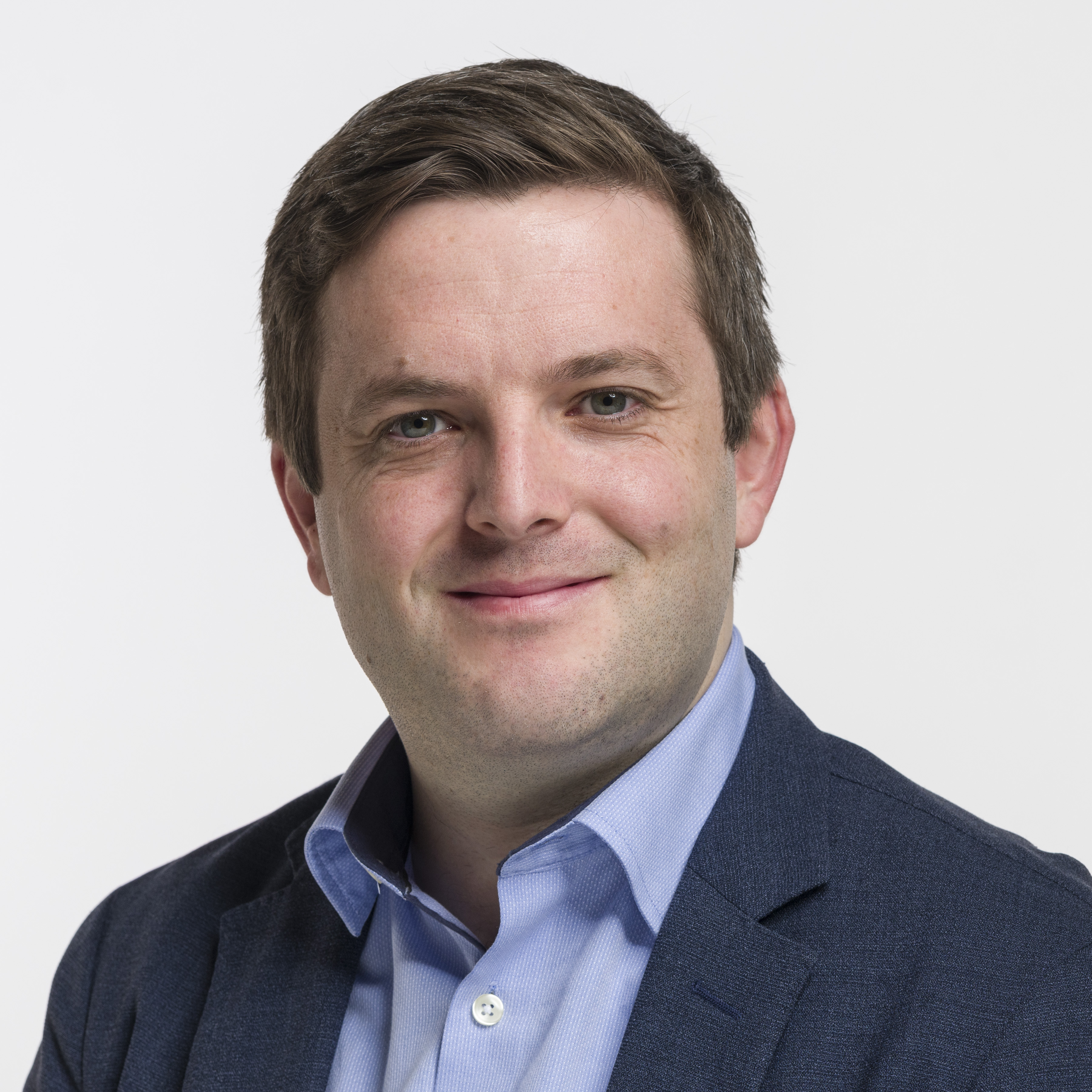
National councillor
Jon Pult
from Grisons
(Official SP/PS Nominee)

==== Potential ====
The following individuals had been subject of speculation about their potential candidacy:

- Priska Seiler Graf (SP-ZH), national councillor for Zurich (2015–present), former Zurich cantonal councillor (2005–2015)
- Samira Marti (SP-BL), national councillor for Basel-Landschaft (2018–present)
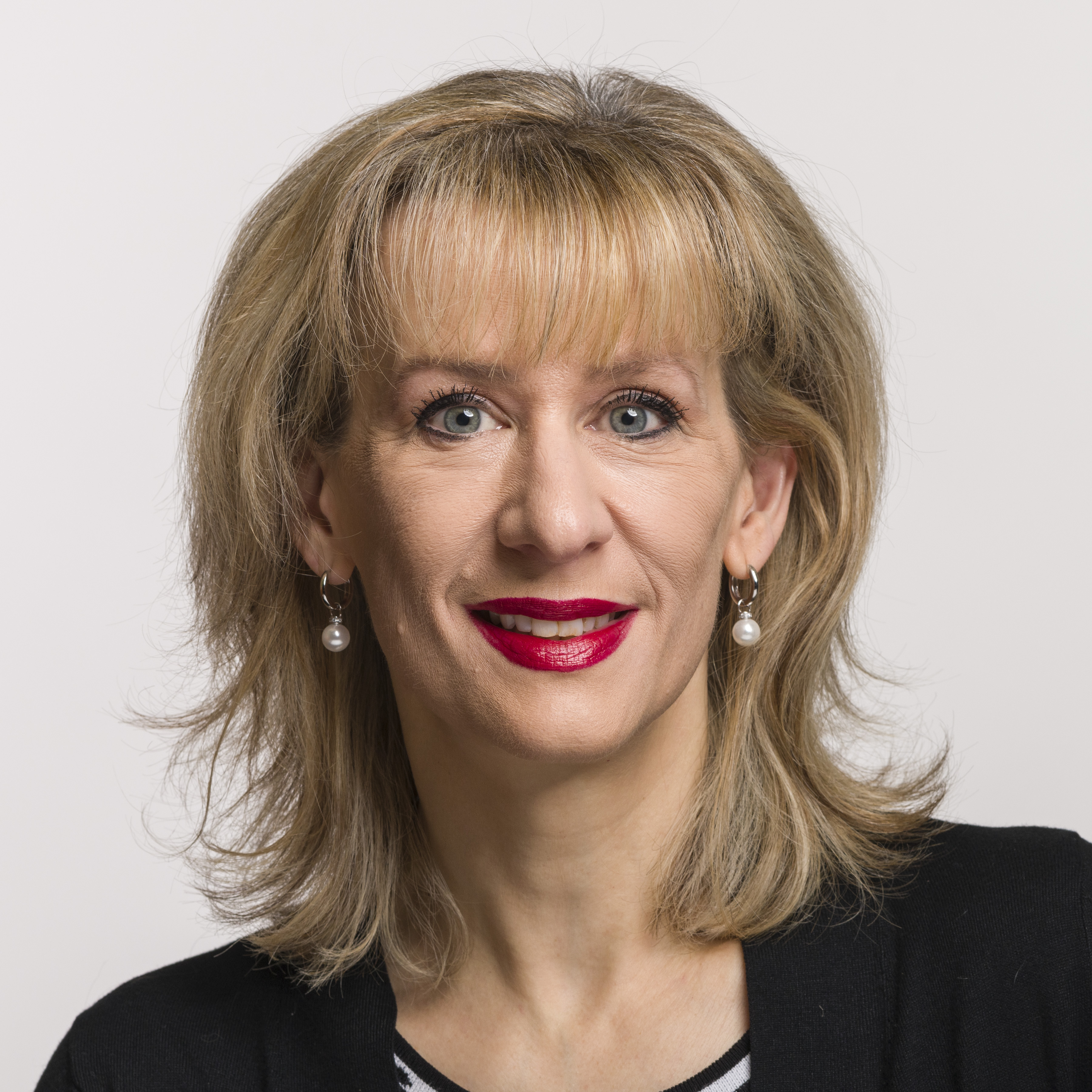
National councillor
Priska Seiler Graf
from Zurich

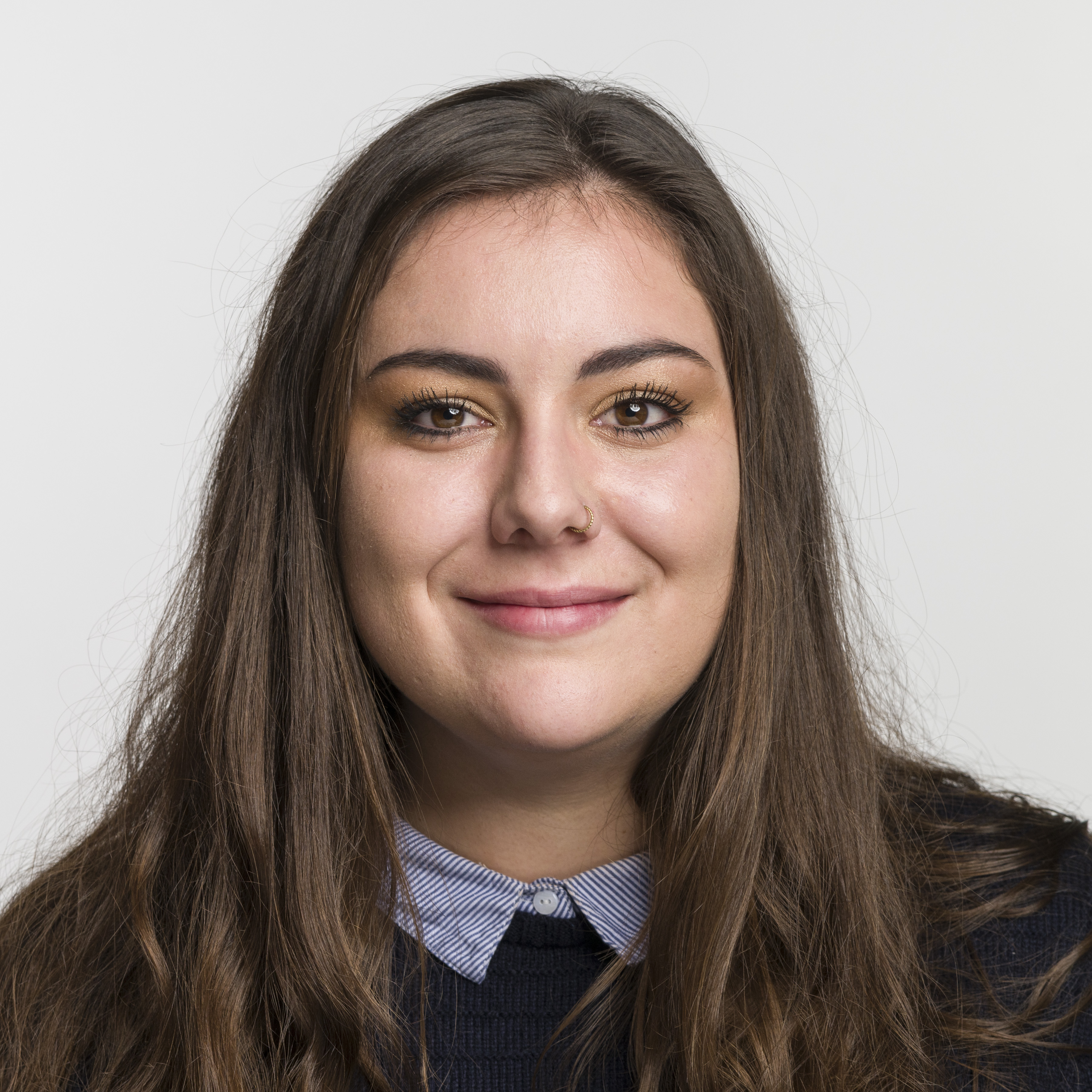
National councillor
Samira Marti
from Basel-Landschaft

==== Declined to be candidate ====
The following individual has been the subject of speculation about her possible candidacy, but has publicly denied interest in running.

- Eva Herzog (SP-BS), states councillor from Basel-Stadt (2019–present), former Basel-Stadt executive councillor (2005–2020), candidate to the Federal Council in 2010 and 2022
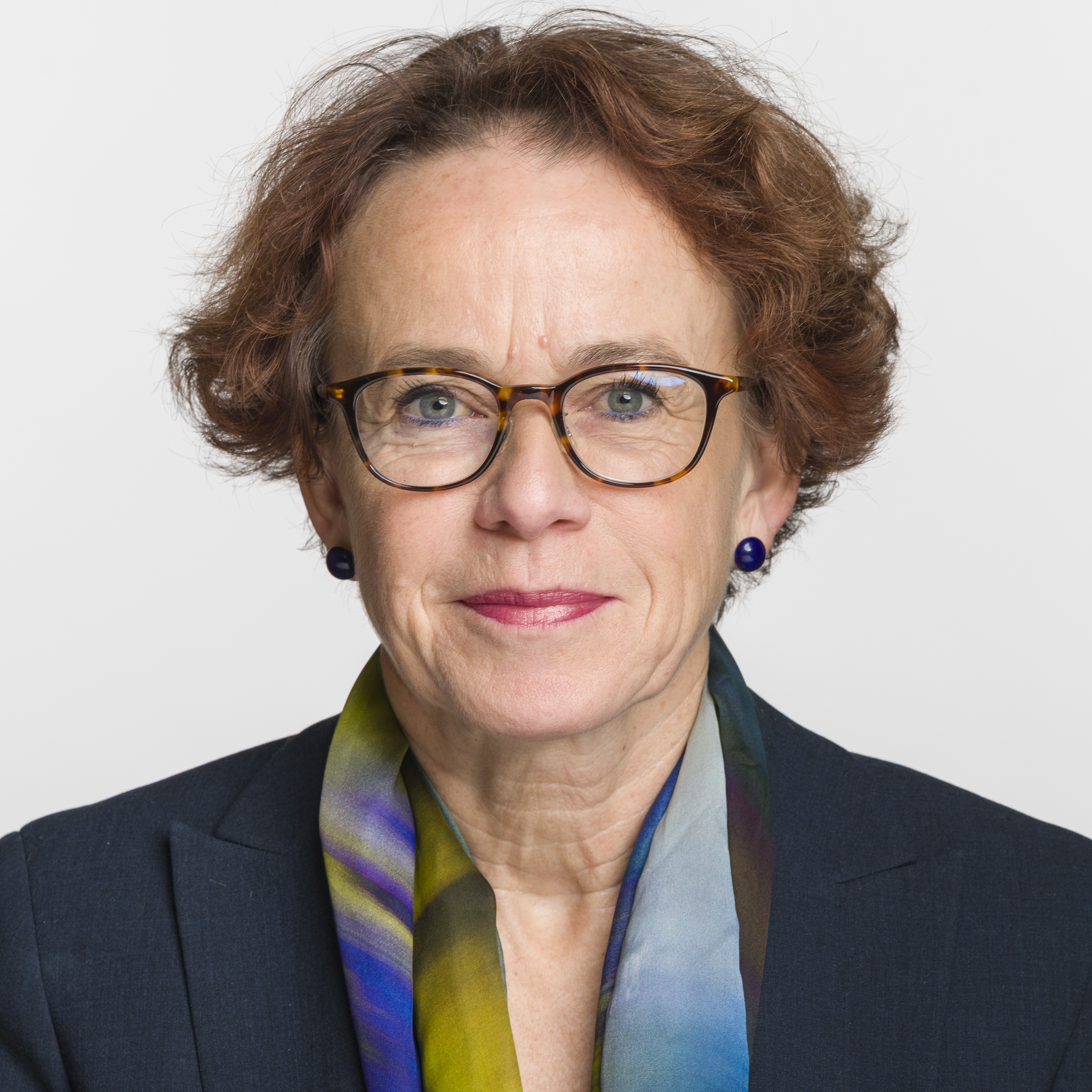
States councillor
Eva Herzog
from Basel-Stadt

=== Candidates to other seats ===
The Greens re-affirmed their claim to a seat in the Council, preferably the FDP seat of Ignazio Cassis, despite losing vote share in the October elections and nominated the following individual. This candidacy was not supported by any other parliamentary group in the federal assembly.

- Gerhard Andrey (Greens-FR), national councillor for Fribourg (2019–present)
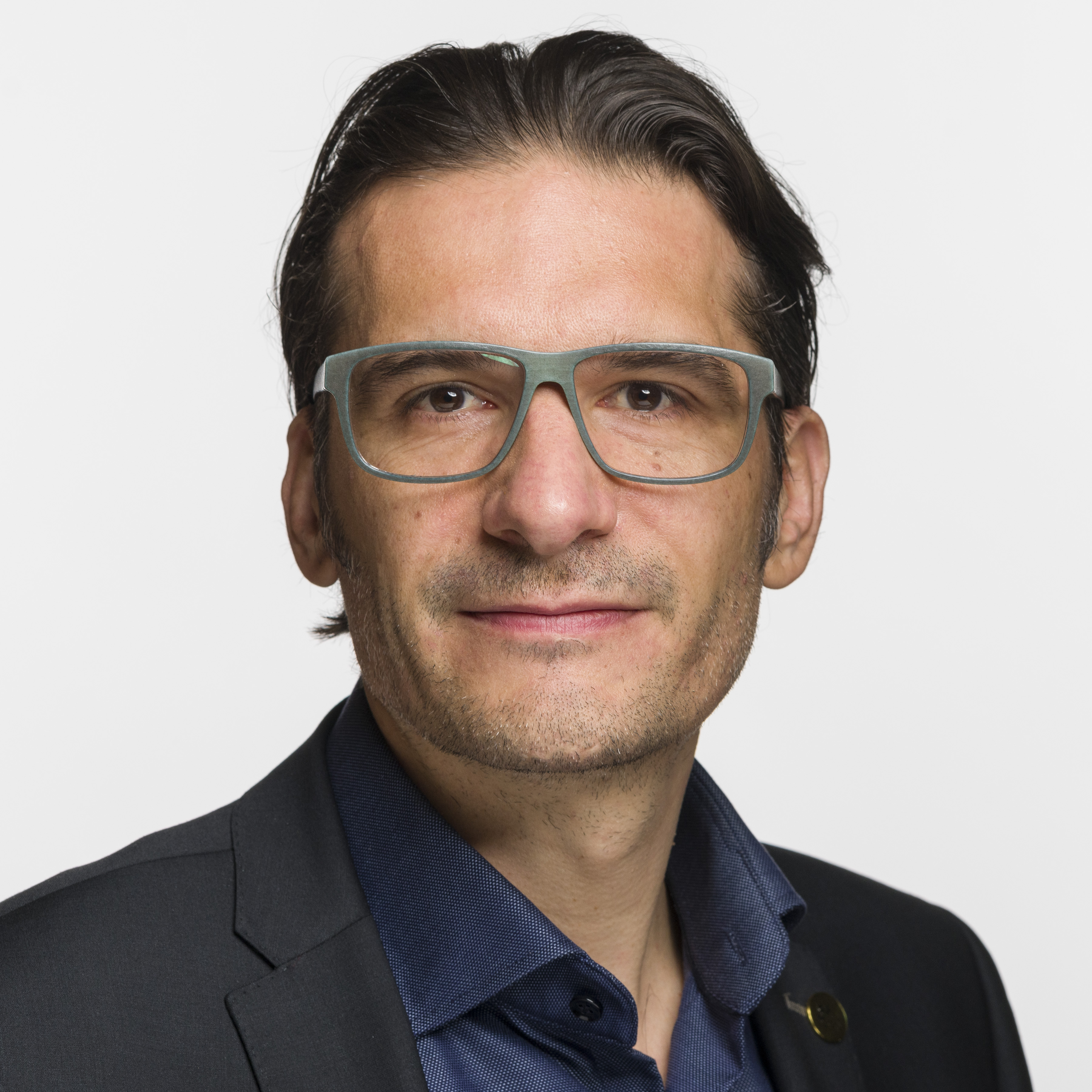
National councillor
Gerhard Andrey
from Fribourg

== Candidates for Federal Chancellor ==
Due to the vacancy created by the resignation of Federal Chancellor Walter Thurnherr (The Centre), the following individuals had announced their candidacy:

- Viktor Rossi (GLP-ZH), Incumbent Federal Vice-Chancellor (2019–present)
- Nathalie Goumaz (SVP-FR), Incumbent General Secretarity of the Federal Department of Economic Affairs, Education and Research (2019-present), Former General Secretarity of the Federal Department of Defence, Civil Protection and Sport (2016-2018)
- Gabriel Lüchinger (SVP-BE), Head of the International Security Division of the Federal Department of Foreign Affairs
- Lukas Gresch-Brunner (Independent), Incumbent General Secretary of the Federal Department of Home Affairs

== Results ==
=== Open seat vacated by Alain Berset ===
Following the retirement of the incumbent President and Federal Councillor Alain Berset (SP-FR), an election of the replacement has been held. Beat Jans (SP-BS), Basel-Stadt executive councillor since 2021, has been elected member of the Federal Council in the third round of voting with 134 votes, beating states councillor Daniel Jositsch (SP-ZH), who received votes despite not being nominated by any parliamentary group, and national councillor Jon Pult (SP-GR).

Candidate	Party	Round 1	Round 2	Round 3
Beat Jans	SP	89	112	134
Daniel Jositsch	SP	63	70	68
Jon Pult	SP	49	54	43
Gerhard Andrey	GPS	30		
Others		12	10	0
Valid votes		243	246	245
Absolute majority		122	124	123
Invalid votes		0	0	0
Blank votes		3	0	0
Votes cast		246	246	245

=== Seat held by Guy Parmelin ===
Guy Parmelin (SVP-VD) was reelected in the first round of voting.

Candidate	Party	Round 1
Guy Parmelin	SVP	215
Others		18
Valid votes		233
Absolute majority		117
Invalid votes		1
Blank votes		12
Votes cast		246

=== Seat held by Ignazio Cassis ===
Ignazio Cassis (FDP-TI) was reelected in the first round of voting. The Greens decided to challenge both FDP.The Liberals seats in the Federal Council as they had done in the 2019 elections and fielded Green Party national councillor Gerhard Andrey to challenge the seats. His candidacy presumably gathered green and some green liberal votes (the votes are cast in secret), but failed to get social democratic voters, thus Ignazio Cassis was re-elected outright without a second round of voting.

Candidate	Party	Round 1
Ignazio Cassis	FDP	167
Gerhard Andrey	GPS	59
Others		13
Valid votes		239
Absolute majority		120
Invalid votes		2
Blank votes		5
Votes cast		246

=== Seat held by Viola Amherd ===
Viola Amherd (DM-VS) was reelected in the first round of voting.

Candidate	Party	Round 1
Viola Amherd	DM	201
Others		27
Valid votes		228
Absolute majority		115
Invalid votes		2
Blank votes		16
Votes cast		246

=== Seat held by Karin Keller-Sutter ===
Karin Keller-Sutter (FDP-SG) was reelected in the first round of voting.

Candidate	Party	Round 1
Karin Keller-Sutter	FDP	176
Anna Giacometti	FDP	15
Gerhard Andrey	GPS	15
Others		18
Valid votes		224
Absolute majority		11
Invalid votes		1
Blank votes		21
Votes cast		246

=== Seat held by Albert Rösti ===
Albert Rösti (SVP-BE) was reelected in the first round of voting.

Candidate	Party	Round 1
Albert Rösti	SVP	189
Others		28
Valid votes		217
Absolute majority		109
Invalid votes		2
Blank votes		26
Votes cast		245

=== Seat held by Élisabeth Baume-Schneider ===
Élisabeth Baume-Schneider (SP-JU) was reelected in the first round of voting.

Candidate	Party	Round 1
Élisabeth Baume-Schneider	SP	151
Gerhard Andrey	GPS	23
Eva Herzog	SP	15
Others		27
Valid votes		216
Absolute majority		109
Invalid votes		2
Blank votes		28
Votes cast		246

=== Additional votes ===
==== Federal Chancellor ====
2023 Swiss chancellor election
← 2019	13 December 2023	2027 →

All 246 votes of the Federal Assembly 124 votes needed to win
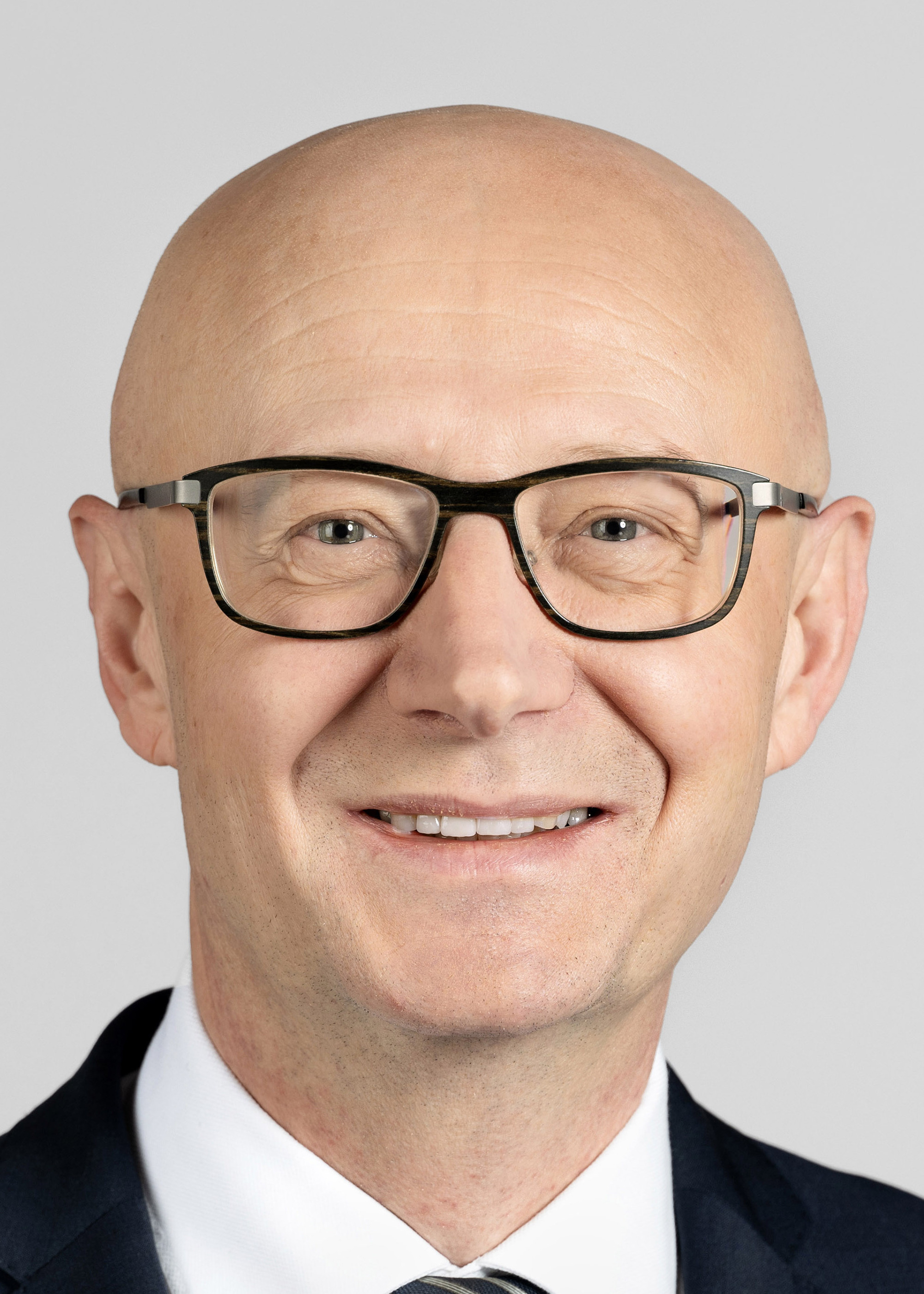
		SVP
Candidate	Viktor Rossi	Gabriel Lüchinger
Party	Green Liberals	Swiss People's
First ballot	98	78
Second ballot	135	103
	Ind	SVP
Candidate	Lukas Gresch-Brunner	Nathalie Goumaz
Party	Independent	Swiss People's
First ballot	45	24
Chancellor before election
Walter Thurnherr
The Centre
Elected Chancellor
Viktor Rossi
Green Liberals

The Federal Chancellor is a technocratic position and not a voting member of the Federal Council, but they are elected after the seven ministers using the same rules.

Following the resignation of the incumbent Chancellor Walter Thurnherr (The Centre), an election of the replacement has been held. Viktor Rossi (GLP), a Vice-Chancellor since 2019, has been elected a new Chancellor in the second round of voting with 135 votes, beating Gabriel Lüchinger (SVP).

Candidate	Party	Round 1	Round 2
Viktor Rossi	GLP	98	135
Gabriel Lüchinger	SVP	78	103
Lukas Gresch-Brunner	Independent	45	
Nathalie Goumaz	SVP	24	
Others		1	7
Valid votes		246	245
Absolute majority		124	124
Invalid votes		0	1
Blank votes		0	0
Votes cast		246	246

==== President of the Confederation ====
2023 Swiss presidential election
← 2022	13 December 2023	2024 →
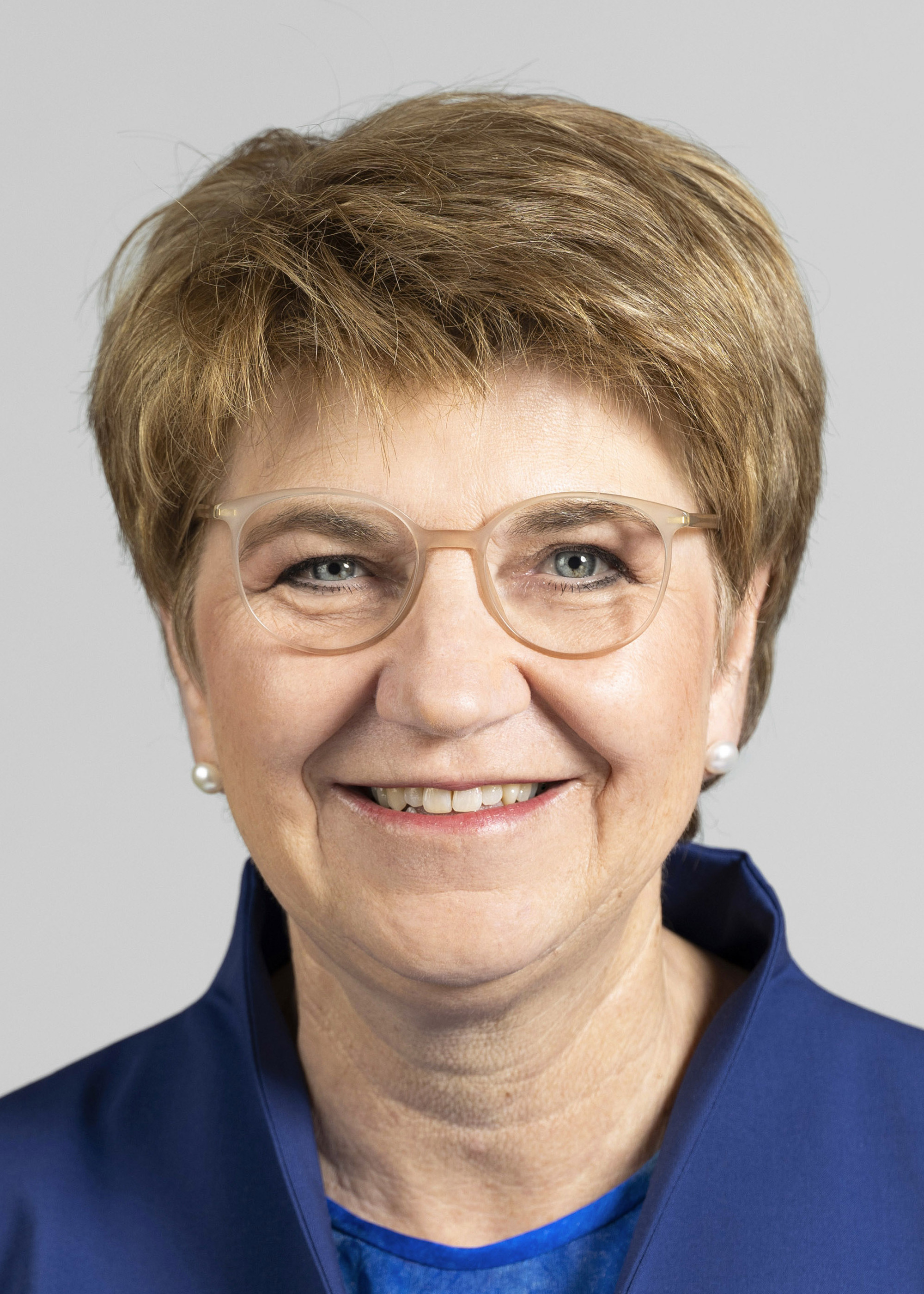
Candidate	Viola Amherd
Party	The Centre
Electoral vote	158 / 204
President before election
Alain Berset
Elected President
Viola Amherd

The President of the Confederation is a member of the Federal Council elected every year, with no additional powers apart from chairing meetings of the Federal Council.

Viola Amherd (DM-VS) was elected in the first round of voting.

Candidate	Party	Round 1
Viola Amherd	DM	158
Albert Rösti	SVP	21
Others		25
Valid votes		204
Absolute majority		103
Invalid votes		3
Blank votes		36
Votes cast		243

==== Vice President of the Federal Council ====
The Vice President of the Federal Council is a member of the Federal Council elected every year like the President, and the presumptive president for the next year.

Karin Keller-Sutter (FDP-SG) was elected in the first round of voting.

Candidate	Party	Round 1
Karin Keller-Sutter	FDP	138
Albert Rösti	SVP	18
Élisabeth Baume-Schneider	SP	16
Ignazio Cassis	FDP	10
Beat Jans	SP	10
Guy Parmelin	SVP	4
Others		0
Valid votes		196
Absolute majority		99
Invalid votes		3
Blank votes		41
Votes cast		240

== Departmental reshuffle ==
After the elections, the newly elected council meets to assign the departments of the Federal administration to each councillor. The departments are attributed by a council decision; in practice, each member announces their preference in order of seniority leaving the newly-elected members last, and the council adopts their preferences. In 2018, as Viola Amherd and Karin Keller-Sutter were elected on the same day, the council chose to let Keller-Sutter choose earlier despite having been elected slightly later.

The resignation of Alain Berset left the Federal Department of Home Affairs open for the first time since 2011. In a surprise reshuffle Élisabeth Baume-Schneider took over the Department of Home Affairs after serving as head of the justice and police department for only one year. Newly-elected Beat Jans took over the Federal Justice and Police Department previously led by Baume-Schneider. The other departments remained with their previous heads. The reshuffle was announced on 14 December 2023 and took effect on 1 January 2024.

Council Member	Position before reshuffle	Position after reshuffle
Viola Amherd (DM-VS)	Head of the Federal Department of Defence, Civil Protection and Sport Vice President of the Federal Council	Head of the Federal Department of Defence, Civil Protection and Sport President of the Swiss Confederation
Guy Parmelin (SVP-VD)	Head of the Federal Department of Economic Affairs, Education and Research	Head of the Federal Department of Economic Affairs, Education and Research
Ignazio Cassis (FDP-TI)	Head of the Federal Department of Foreign Affairs	Head of the Federal Department of Foreign Affairs
Karin Keller-Sutter (FDP-SG)	Head of the Federal Department of Finance	Head of the Federal Department of Finance Vice President of the Federal Council
Albert Rösti (SVP-BE)	Head of the Federal Department of Environment, Transport, Energy and Communications	Head of the Federal Department of Environment, Transport, Energy and Communications
Élisabeth Baume-Schneider (SP-JU)	Head of the Federal Department of Justice and Police	Head of the Federal Department of Home Affairs
Beat Jans (SP-BS)	not in office	Head of the Federal Department of Justice and Police
