= Stadelhofen (disambiguation) =

Stadelhofen may refer to:

- Stadelhofen, a community in the district of Bamberg and a member of the administrative community of Steinfeld in Germany.
- Stadelhofen, a locality in Zürich, Switzerland

- Zürich Stadelhofen FB railway station, the terminus of the Forchbahn railway
- Zürich Stadelhofen railway station, a railway junction station of the S-Bahn Zürich in Zürich
- Kantonsschule Stadelhofen, a gymnasium located nearby
- Stadelhoferplatz, a square nearby and part of southern Sechseläutenplatz plaza
