= Daniel Jositsch =

Swiss politician (born 1965)

Daniel Jositsch JD
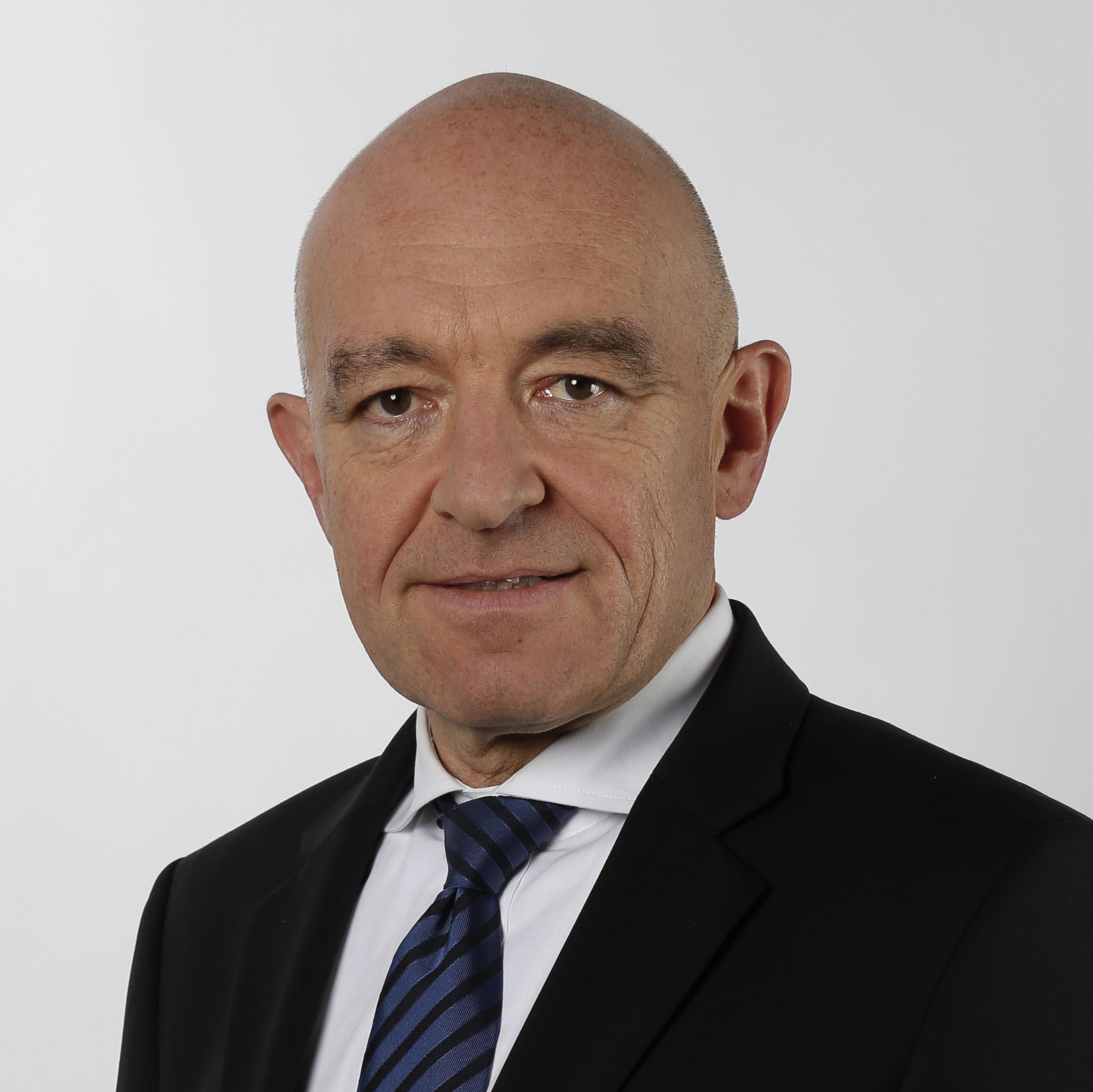
- Official portrait, 2015

Member of the Council of States (Switzerland)
- Incumbent
- Assumed office 8 December 2015
- Constituency: Canton of Zürich

Member of the National Council of Switzerland
- In office 3 December 2007 – 7 December 2015

Personal details
- Born: Daniel Reuwen Jositsch; 25 March 1965 (age 61) Zürich, Switzerland
- Party: Social Democratic Party (until 2026); Independent (since 2026)
- Spouse: Alexia Stouder Darce (m. 2025)
- Children: 1
- Education: University of St. Gallen
- Occupation: Prof. Dr. iur. (Lehrstuhl für Strafrecht und Strafprozessrecht) at the University of Zürich, law historian and writer
- Profession: Professor for penelogy
- Website: Official website Parliament website

Military service
- Allegiance: Switzerland
- Branch/service: Swiss Armed Forces
- Rank: Lieutenant Colonel

Daniel Reuwen Jositsch (Swiss Standard German pronunciation: [ˈdaːni̯eːl ˈrɔʏvn̩ ˈjoːzɪtʃ, ˈdaːni̯ɛl -]; born 25 March 1965) is a Swiss attorney and politician who currently serves on the Council of States for the Social Democratic Party respectively as an independent representing the Canton of Zürich since 2015. He previously served on the National Council from 2007 to 2015 and briefly on the Cantonal Council of Zürich in 2007.

In 2022 and 2023 he declared candidacy for Federal Council but both times was not officially nominated by his party. In 2026, Jositsch was not supported in another candidacy for Council of States, an office he held since 2015, by his party. On 4 June 2026, Jositisch announced candidacy as an independent opposing the nominee of the Social Democrats, Jacqueline Badran.

== Early life and education ==
Jositsch was born 25 March 1965 in Zurich, Switzerland, to Peter Jositsch, an engineer, and Edith Jositsch (née Korek), into a Swiss Jewish family.

He is of Ashkenazi Jewish descent from the Russian Empire on both his paternal and maternal side. His paternal great-grandfather, Benjamin Josselowitsch, became a Swiss citizen in 1913 by taking municipal citizenship in Geroldswil. There were several variants on the spelling of his last name including Joselowitz and Josselowitsch which were both germanized to Jositsch at a later stage. Upon his election campaign for Council of States, Jositsch stated the following about his origins:

My great-grandfather came from Ukraine to Switzerland in the 19th century, Jositsch explained on occasion of an interview, his Jewish roots are important. I feel connected to this tradition. Although the Judaism does not define my everyday life, but as a parliamentarian I take myself to the interests of the Jewish minority.

— Daniel Jositsch

Jositsch was raised in the Limmat Valley and completed his Matura in 1984 at Kantonsschule Stadelhofen. He studied law at the University of St. Gallen.

== Career ==
In 2004 he qualified as a professor at the University of Zurich, and was appointed as Associate Professor of Criminal Law and Criminal auxiliary sciences. In 2012, Jositsch was promoted by the university council to full professor.

== Politics ==
In spring 2007 Jositsch was elected as a member of the SP Zürich in the parliament of the Canton of Zürich, and since October 2007 he was a member of the Swiss National Council. In the first round of the 2015 Council of States elections in the canton of Zürich, Jositsch won the majority, and for the first time since 32 years, an SP politician will represent the canton of Zürich in the Swiss Council of States (Ständerat).

During the 2023 Swiss federal election, Jositsch had been an opposition candidate, to succeed Alain Berset on the Federal Council (Switzerland), however was not officially nominated by the Social Democratic Party. Despite this he received a respectable number of votes (presumably from the Swiss People's Party and The Liberals) running competitively (second with 70 votes) against the official candidates Jon Pult and Beat Jans. Ultimately, Beat Jans, was elected into office on 13 December 2023. His actions are often titled The Jositsch Coup by press.

== Personal life ==
Jositsch was firstly married to a Colombian with whom he had one son. They were divorced. Between 2008 and 2014, he was in a relationship with Chantal Galladé, with whom he concurrently served on the National Council. On 26 July 2025, Jositsch married secondly to French-born Alexia Darce (née Stouder), whom he met in a book shop and has been engaged to since December 2024.

End of October 2015 Jositsch announced to stand for the five-person chairmanship of the Israelitische Cultusgemeinde Zürich (ICZ), the largest Jewish community in Switzerland, on 2 December 2015. The candidacy is a private commitment without a professional or political context.
