= Gerhard Andrey =

Swiss politician

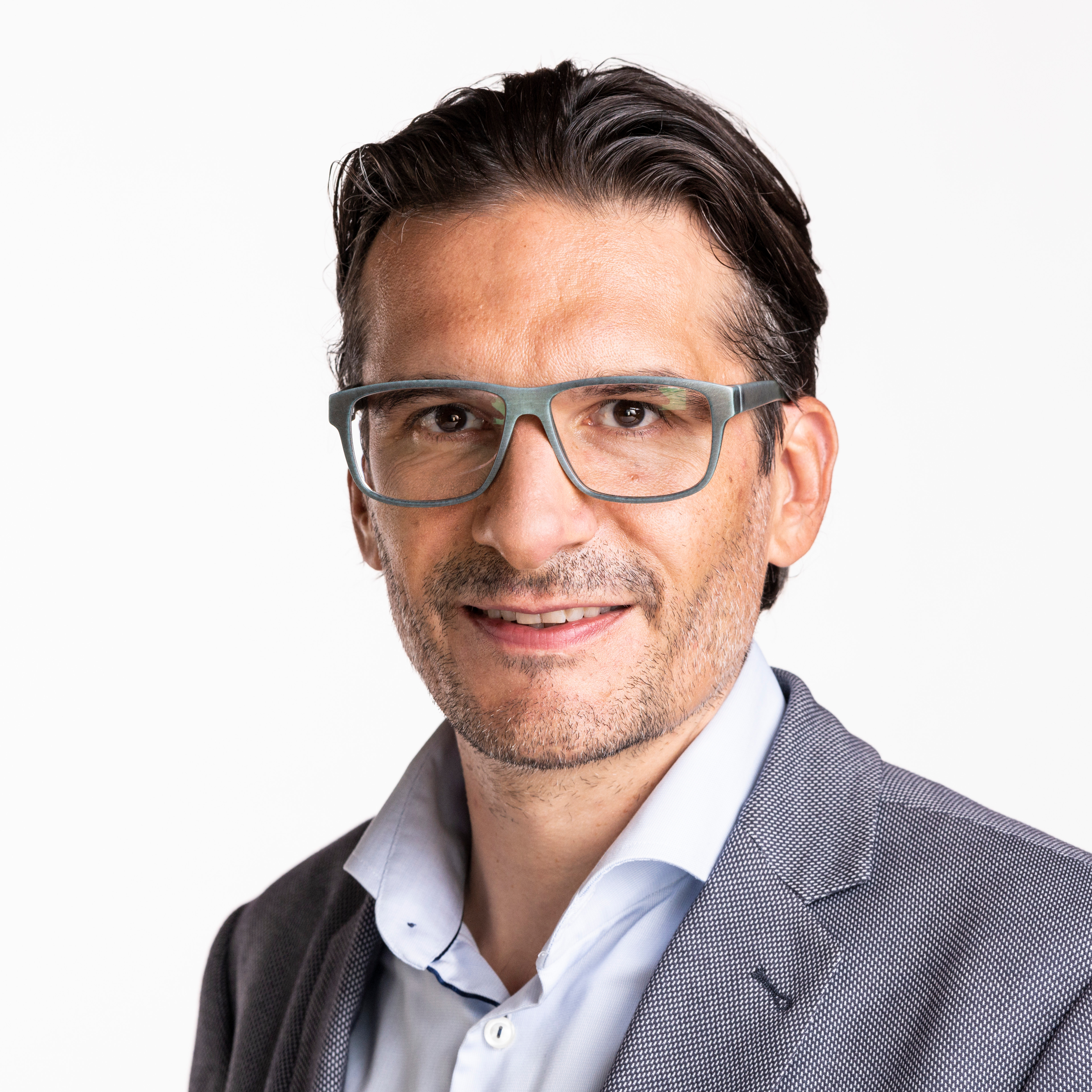
- Official portrait, 2021

Member of National Council (Switzerland)
- Incumbent
- Assumed office 2 December 2019
- Constituency: Canton of Fribourg

Personal details
- Born: Gerhard Andrey; 21 January 1976 (age 50) Fribourg, Switzerland
- Citizenship: Switzerland
- Party: Green Party of Switzerland
- Spouse: Christina Gräni
- Children: 2
- Education: University of Fribourg
- Website: Official website (in German and French)

Gerhard Andrey (born 21 January 1976) is a Swiss entrepreneur and politician who currently serves as a member of the Swiss National Council for the canton of Fribourg. A member of the Green Party of Switzerland Andrey was the Green Party's candidate for Federal Council in the 2023 Federal Council election to unseat incumbent FDP federal councillors, which did not succeed.

== Early life and education ==
Andrey was born on 21 January 1976 in Fribourg, Switzerland to Annelies and Peter Andrey. His father was a farmer and community councillor of the Christian Democratic People's Party in Heitenried in Fribourg.

From 1991 to 1995 Gerhard Andrey learnt to be a carpenter in St. Antoni. He then went on to study wood engineering at the Bern University of Applied Sciences from 1996 to 2000 and in 1999 Andrey worked in Costa Rica on an apprenticeship. In 2001 Andrey visited a post-diploma course to become a computer science mediator at the University of Fribourg.

== Career ==
From 2003 to 2006 Andrey was co-founder and manager of a media company, Mediagonal AG. In the year 2007 Andrey founded the advertisement agency Liip AG together with Hannes Gassert, Nadja Perroulaz and Christian Stocker in Fribourg. Andrey sits on several board of directors, among them a small Swiss bank, called the Alternative Bank Schweiz.

== Politics ==
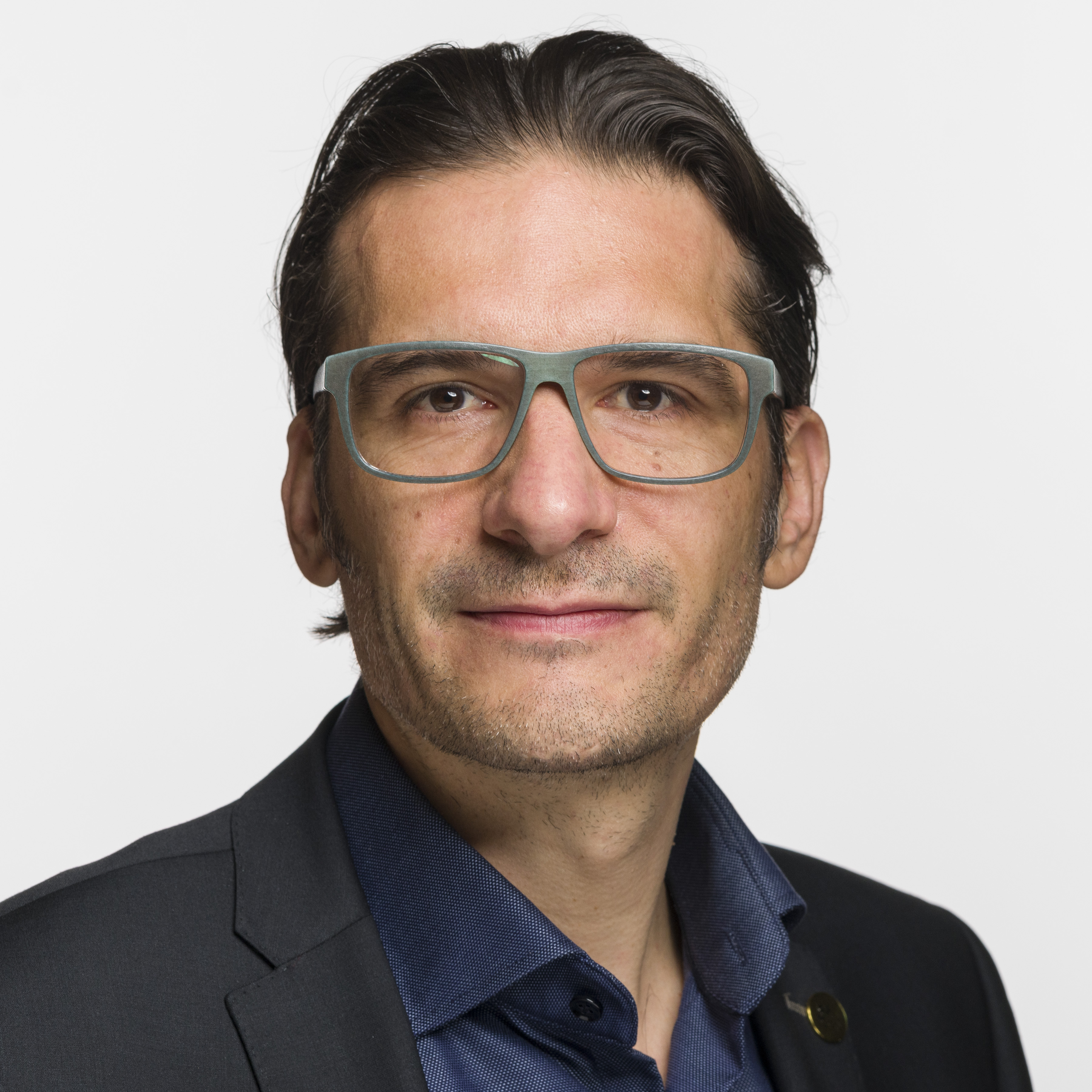
Gerhard Andrey upon his election to the Swiss National Council in 2019

Andrey started his political career in 2010 when he became board member and later vice-president of the Fribourg local section of the Swiss Green Party. In 2012, he became a board member of the national party. He held both these offices until 2016 when he became vice-president of the national Swiss Green Party. From 2016 to 2020 Andrey was a member of the committee supporting a popular initiative for a 20-day paternity leave in Switzerland.

In the Swiss Federal parliament elections of October 2019 Gerhard Andrey was elected to the Swiss National Council for the canton of Fribourg. In 2023 Andrey was reelected.

=== Candidacy for Federal Councillor ===
As in 2019 the Green party called the distribution of the Federal Council into question on the ground that the right-wing parties Swiss People's Party and the Liberals were in a majority on the Federal Council but had lost that majority in the federal assembly. (Note: They had lost that majority in parliament in 2019 and failed to reach it again in 2023. On the Federal Council the SVP-FDP majority existed since 2015.) In 2019 the Green Party had gained seats and attacked the seat of Ignazio Cassis on the council, failing in unseating him. However, in the election of 2023 the Green Party had lost seats.

Nevertheless, on 27 October 2023 the President of the Green Party Balthasar Glättli announced that yet again the Green party would attack one of the liberal party's seats. On 10 November 2023 the Green Party nominated Gerhard Andrey to the Federal Council after several high-profile green party politicians refused. The green bid was speculated to have very low chances of success. While the Swiss Social Democratic Party shared the greens point of view, they did not officially support the green bid due to the other parties announcing that if the green candidate were to be elected the other parties would not support the official candidates of the SP in the election to succeed Alain Berset, which was to happen after the other members' election.

The election for Federal Council was held on 13 December 2023. Andrey received 59 of 239 votes, attacking incumbent Ignazio Cassis who won in the first round of voting with 167 votes. He also received 15 of 224 votes attacking incumbent Karin Keller-Sutter who also won reelection. Furthermore, Andrey received votes in the reelection of Socialist party candidate Élisabeth Baume-Schneider and in the vote to elect a replacement for Socialist party Federal Councillor Alain Berset who was not seeking reelection. In both cases he was not elected.

== Personal life ==
Gerhard Andrey is married to Christina Gräni. The couple have two children, called Anna and Basil. Andrey grew up speaking German and French. Additionally, he speaks English and Spanish fluently.
