= 2023 Swiss referendums =

- June referendums
- 18 June 2023

Implementation of the OECD/G20 project on special taxation of large groups of companies
For	78%
Against	22%

Federal Act on Climate Protection Targets, Innovation and Strengthening Energy Security
For	59%
Against	41%

Amendment to the COVID-19 Act
For	62%
Against	38%

Maps
- Yes 50–60% 60–70% 70–80% 80–90% No 50–60%

Several referendums were held in Switzerland during 2023. The only national votes were held on 18 June, with subnational votes held on 12 March, 22 October (alongside the federal elections) and 26 November.

== March referendums ==
Although 12 March had been scheduled as a voting day, no national referendums were approved for the date. However, cantonal referendums took place in Geneva (on a proposed increase in the tax rate on profits for large shareholders) and Basel-Stadt (on tax cuts). The proposal in Geneva was rejected by 59% of voters, while the referendum in Basel passed with a large majority.

== June referendums ==
Three referendums were held on 18 June:

- On the Implementation of the OECD/G20 project: A constitutional amendment aiming to ensure that large international corporate groups are taxed at a rate of at least 15% as proposed by the OECD and G20.
- On the Federal Act on Climate Protection Targets, Innovation and Strengthening Energy Security: A parliamentary proposal seeking to gradually reduce Switzerland's consumption of mineral oil and natural gas through financial support for those who replace their oil, gas or electric heating, and for companies that invest in climate-friendly technologies. The goal is for Switzerland to become climate neutral by 2050.
- On the Amendment of 16 December 2022 to the COVID-19 Act: An amendment extending until mid-2024 the period of application for the legal provisions on certain measures in the COVID-19 Act such as COVID certificates or imports of medicines for severe COVID-19 related diseases.

=== Results ===
Question	For			Against			Invalid/ blank	Total votes	Registered voters	Turnout	Outcome
Question	Votes	%	Cantons	Votes	%	Cantons	Invalid/ blank	Total votes	Registered voters	Turnout	Outcome
Implementation of the OECD/G20 project on special taxation of large groups of companies	1,803,309	78.45	20 6/2	495,239	21.55	0	60,075	2,358,623	5,567,120	42.37	Approved
Federal Act on Climate Protection Targets, Innovation and Strengthening Energy Security	1,380,974	59.07	–	957,077	40.93	–	30,085	2,368,136	5,567,120	42.54	Approved
Amendment to the COVID-19 Act	1,438,216	61.94	–	883,778	38.06	–	43,160	2,365,154	5,567,120	42.48	Approved
Source: Federal Chancellery
