= Jon Pult =

Swiss politician (born 1984)

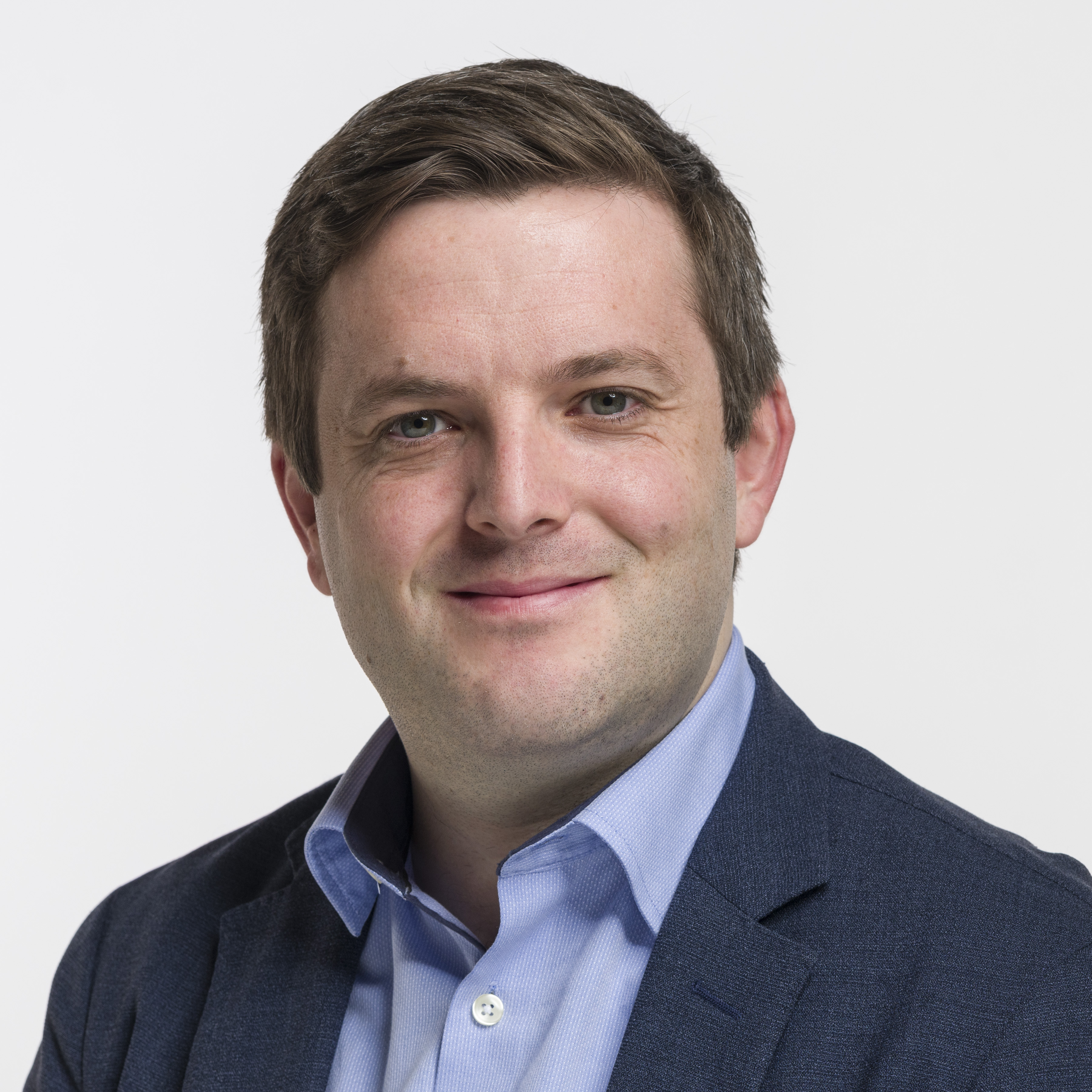
- Official portrait, 2019

Member of the National Council (Switzerland)
- Incumbent
- Assumed office 2 December 2019
- Constituency: Canton of Grisons

Member of the Grand Council of Grisons
- In office 2010–2018

Personal details
- Born: Jon Andri Pult; October 12, 1984 (age 41) Scuol, Switzerland
- Citizenship: Switzerland; Italy
- Party: Social Democratic Party of Switzerland
- Domestic partner: Sara Ibrahim
- Children: 1
- Education: University of Zürich (Licentiate)
- Occupation: Consultant, historian and politician
- Website: Official website Parliament website

Jon Andri Pult (German pronunciation: [jɔn pʊlt]; Italian pronunciation: [ˈjɔm ˈpult]; born 12 October 1984) is a Swiss consultant, historian and politician who currently serves as a member of the National Council (Switzerland) for the Social Democratic Party since 2019. He previously served on the Grand Council of Grisons between 2010 and 2018. In the 2023 Swiss federal election, Pult declared official candidacy for Federal Council (Switzerland), to succeed Alain Berset.

== Early life and education ==
Pult was born 12 October 1984 in Scuol, Switzerland, to Clot Pult, a teacher, and Marcella Pult (née Palmara), an Italian-born art historian and translator. He was raised in Guarda and Milan until he entered kindergarten in Domat/Ems. His grandfather was romanist and culture advocate. His uncle is Romansh lecturer, translator and cultural mediator Chasper Pult (born 1949). Later he attended primary and high school in Chur. Following he studied history at the University of Zurich and graduated with a licentiate about the History of the Rhaetian Railway.

== Professional career ==
In 2016, Jon Pult was employed by Feinheit, a campaign and strategy developer. Since 2022, he is a Member of the Board of Feinheit. In 2014, Pult assumed the presidency of the Alpine Initiative, an association which aims at safeguarding the Alps from transit traffic. In March 2024 Jon Pult was elected as member of the Board of the Convivenza Foundation - International Center for Minorities.

== Political career ==
He has for years been mentioned as one of the political talents with the Neue Zürcher Zeitung describing him in 2014 as the political talent. Three former presidents of the SP have lauded him and he is widely viewed a promising politician. Jaqueline Fehr called him in 2010 a promise to the future, Peter Bodenmann reasoned in 2015 that the current SP president Christian Levrat was only staying president to give Pult some more time to get ready and when Helmut Hubacher was asked who the candidates for the succession of Levrat were, he answered that even though the people talked about others, in his opinion Pult was the main talent for the party.

=== Cantonal politics ===
Between 2005 and 2011, he was a member of the Municipal Council of Chur, and between 2010 and 2018 one of the Grand Council of Grisons. As a Grand Councilor he was in favor of a revision of the electoral system from the majoral to the proportional system and joined forces with the Swiss People's Party (SVP). In 2013, the Grisons branch of the SP managed to stop the candidature of St.Moritz to become the host of the Olympic Games 2022.

In 2018 he resigned because he wanted to be elected to the National Council in 2019 and his party would have lost a seat if he had to resign from the Grand Council after getting elected to the National Council.

=== Member of the National Council ===
In national politics he was a candidate to the National Council in 2011 and also 2015, but was not elected. In 2019 he was a candidate to both the National Council (the lower chamber) and the Council of States (the higher chamber). In his electoral campaign to the National Council he positioned himself as focused on policy regarding traffic and Europe. Eventually he was elected to the National Council as a representative for Grisons for the SP.

== Personal life ==
Pult is in a relationship with Sara Ibrahim, an editor and journalist, of Egyptian and Italian origin. She primarily works for SwissInfo focussing on Middle Eastern and North African topics. They have one child.

Pult is a citizen of Italy and Switzerland and lives in Chur. His place of origin is Sent in Grisons.
