= Grand Council of Grisons =

Unicameral legislature of the Swiss canton of Grisons

Type
- Type: Unicameral legislature

Structure
- Seats: 120
- Political groups: DM (34); FDP (27); SP (27); SVP (25); GLP (7)

Elections
- Last election: 15 May 2022

The Grand Council of Grisons (German: Grosse Rat des Kantons Graubünden; Romansh: Cussegl grond; Italian: Gran Consiglio) is the unicameral legislature of the Swiss canton of Grisons. It meets in the cantonal capital Chur's Grand Council Building (Grossratsgebäude), being composed of 120 members, elected for 4 years.
