= Kantonsschule Stadelhofen =

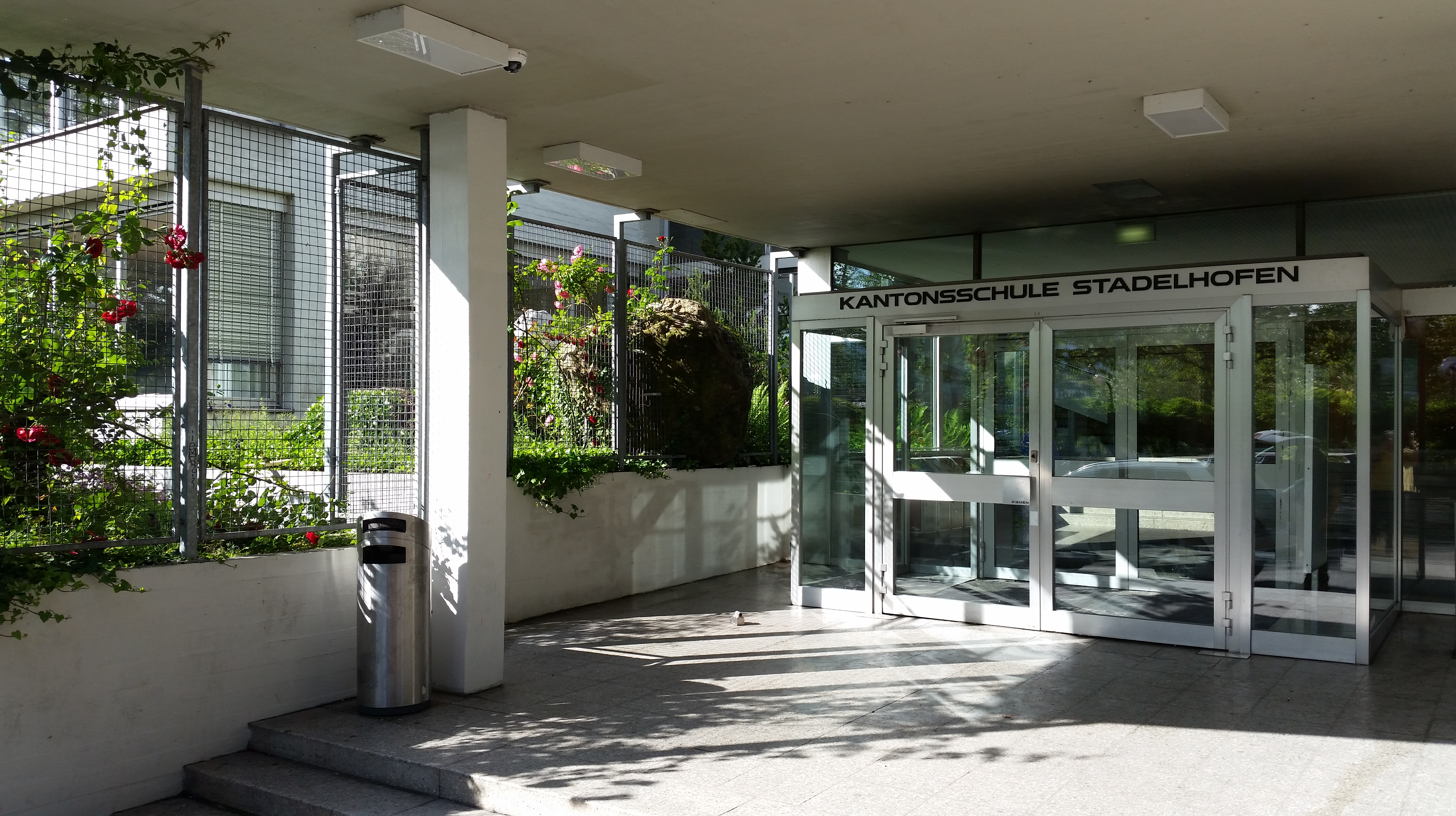
- lower entrance of the Stadelhofen college

Location
- Schanzengasse 17, CH-8001 Zürich; Zurich, Canton of Zürich; Switzerland
- Coordinates: 47°22′3.4″N 8°32′57.3″E

Information
- Type: Public coeducational
- Established: 1874 as Höhere Töchterschule der Stadt Zürich; 1975 as Kantonsschule Stadelhofen
- Teaching staff: 120
- Grades: Langzeit- and Kurzzeitmittelschule (7-12, 9-12)
- Campus: Urban
- Houses: 7 classes
- Website: Official website (in German)

Kantonsschule Stadelhofen (KST) in Zürich-Stadelhofen is an upper secondary school in the Canton of Zürich in Switzerland. KST is organized as a public high school that is teaching on the level of the maturity profiles altsprachlich (classical languages), neusprachlich (modern languages), musisch (fine arts), and mathematisch-naturwissenschaftlich (mathematical and natural sciences). The school in its present form was established in 1975, but its predecessing institution dates back to the former Töchterschule der Stadt Zürich which was established in 1874.

== Villa Hohenbühl ==
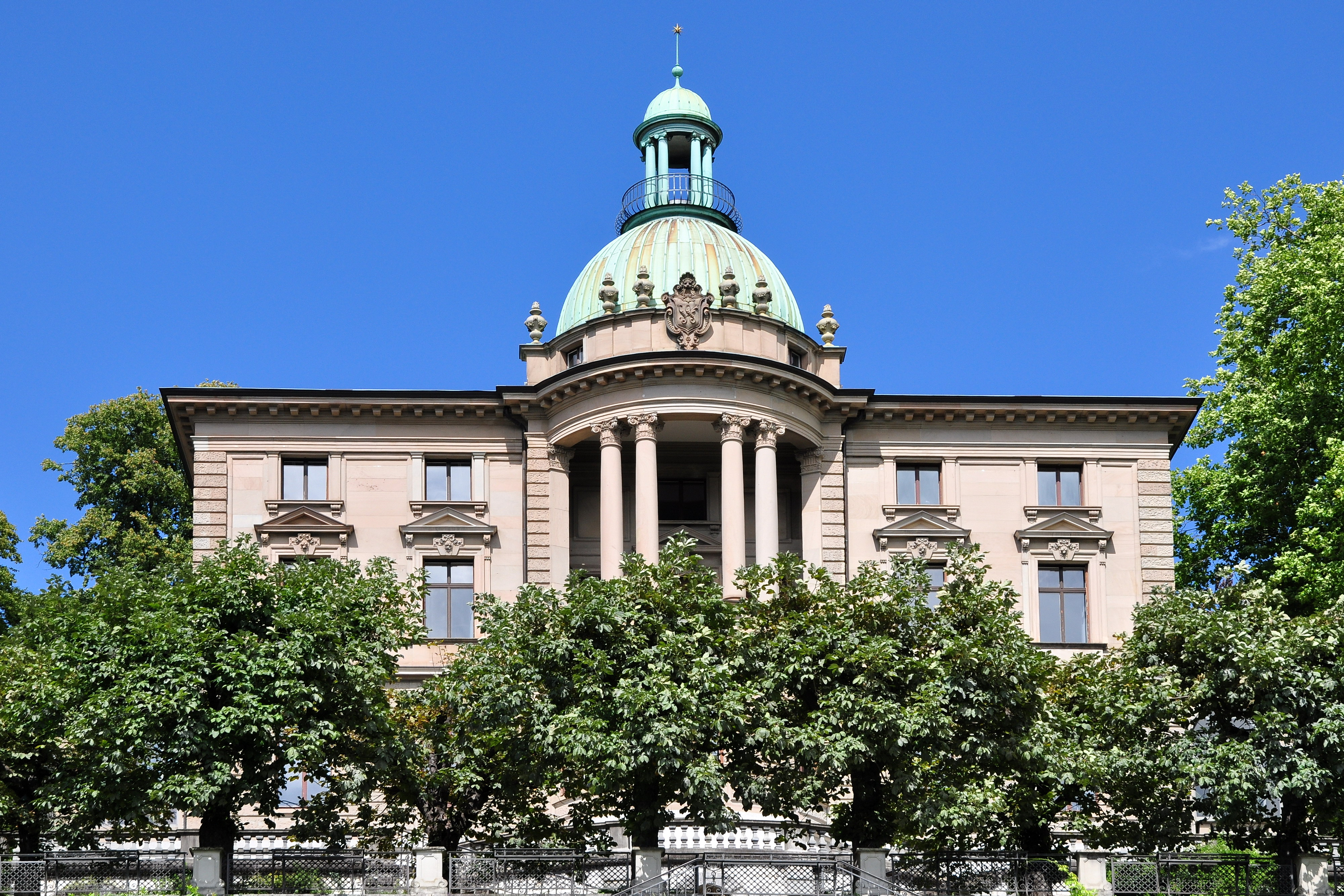
Villa Hohenbühl

Villa Hohenbühl was built by the Swiss architect Alfred Friedrich Bluntschli for Friedrich Wegmann-Schoch from 1887 to 1889. As Bluntschli served also as the architect for the construction of the Enge Church on the opposite Zürichsee lake shore, there ary many similarities in the construction. Surrounded by a beautiful park, the building now houses premises of the adjacent Stadelhofen college.
