= Opinion polling for the 2023 Swiss federal election =

In the run up to the 2023 Swiss federal election and the following Federal Council election, various organizations carry out opinion polling to gauge voting intention and public opinion in Switzerland. Results of such polls are displayed in this article. The date range for these opinion polls is from the previous general election, held on 20 October 2019, to the present day.

== Electoral polling ==
=== Graphical summary ===
The chart below depicts opinion polls conducted for the 2023 Swiss federal election; trendlines are local regressions (LOESS).

Local regression of polls conducted.

=== Nationwide polling ===
==== Since 2021 ====
Polling firm	Fieldwork date	Sample size	SVP/ UDC	SP/ PS	FDP/ PLR	DM/ LC	Grüne/ Verts	GLP/ PVL	EVP/ PEV	EDU/ UDF	Others	Lead
2023 election	22 Oct 2023	–	27.9	18.3	14.3	14.1	9.8	7.6	2.0	1.2	4.9	9.6
Sotomo	22 Sep – 5 Oct 2023	31,850	28.1	18.3	14.1	14.3	9.7	6.8	2.1	–	6.6	9.8
OpinionPlus	20–26 Sep 2023	1,623	28.8	17.8	14.0	14.1	10.4	7.2	2.2	1.1	4.6	11.0
LeeWas	19–20 Sep 2023	29,081	28.7	17.6	13.8	13.6	10.5	7.5	–	–	8.3	11.1
Sotomo	4–25 Aug 2023	40,889	27.6	17.3	14.6	14.8	10.7	7.3	2.1	–	5.6	10.3
LeeWas	10–11 Jul 2023	25,688	27.9	17.3	14.3	13.9	10.7	8.2	–	–	7.7	10.6
Sotomo	8–22 Jun 2023	25,216	27.1	17.8	14.6	14.3	10.2	8.3	2.1	–	5.5	9.3
Sotomo	20 Feb – 5 Mar 2023	27,058	26.6	17.8	15.6	13.3	10.7	8.3	2.1	–	5.6	8.8
LeeWas	15–17 Feb 2023	27,668	27.5	16.9	15.4	13.5	11.1	8.5	–	–	7.1	10.6
Sotomo	26 Sep – 7 Oct 2022	21,038	26.1	16.3	16.1	13.3	11.7	9.3	2.1	–	5.1	9.8
LeeWas	15–16 Aug 2022	26,298	25.9	16.2	16.4	13.4	11.8	9.2	–	–	7.1	9.5
LeeWas	8–9 Dec 2021	19,324	27.0	16.2	15.4	13.3	11.7	10.2	–	–	6.2	10.8
Sotomo	29 Sep – 3 Oct 2021	27,976	26.6	15.8	14.6	13.3	13.2	9.8	2.1	–	5.6	10.8
	1 Jan 2021	CVP/PDC and BDP/PBD merge into DM/LC										

==== 2020 ====
Polling firm	Fieldwork date	Sample size	SVP/ UDC	SP/ PS	FDP/ PLR	GPS/ PES	CVP/ PDC	GLP/ PVL	BDP/ PBD	EVP/ PEV	EDU/ UDF	Others	Lead
Sotomo	23 Oct – 2 Nov 2020	19,620	24.1	16.8	15.1	12.2	11.9	9.8	1.9	2.6	–	5.6	7.3
2019 election	20 Oct 2019	–	25.6	16.8	15.1	13.2	11.4	7.8	2.4	2.1	1.0	4.6	8.8

=== Regional polling (National Council) ===
==== Language regions ====
===== German-speaking Switzerland =====
Polling firm	Fieldwork date	Sample size	SVP	SP	DM	FDP	Grüne	GLP	Others	Lead
Sotomo	22 Sep – 5 Oct 2023	26,274	31.0	17.3	15.4	12.4	8.8	7.8	7.3	13.7
Sotomo	4–25 Aug 2023	32,956	31.0	16.8	15.4	12.9	9.8	7.8	6.3	12.7
2019 election	20 Oct 2019	–	29.0	16.3	14.4 (Note: 11.2 for CVP and 3.2 for BDP.)	13.4	11.8	8.8	6.3	8.8

===== French-speaking Switzerland =====
Polling firm	Fieldwork date	Sample size	PLR	PS	Verts	UDC	LC	PVL	Others	Lead
Sotomo	22 Sep – 5 Oct 2023	4,661	19.1	21.6	13.5	19.3	10.8	5.7	10.0	2.3
Sotomo	4–25 Aug 2023	6,982	19.6	20.1	14.5	18.8	11.3	6.2	9.5	0.5
2019 election	20 Oct 2019	–	20.1	19.1	18.5	16.3	10.8 (Note: 10.5 for CVP and 0.3 for BDP.)	5.7	9.5	1.0

==== Canton of Aargau (16 seats) ====
Polling firm	Fieldwork date	Sample size	SVP	SP	FDP	DM	Grüne	GLP	EVP	EDU	Others	Lead
2023 election	22 Oct 2023	–	35.5	16.4	13.1	12.0	7.1	8.5	4.5	1.0	1.2	19.1
OpinionPlus	6–16 Sep 2023	1,458	34.9	17.1	13.1	13.3	7.7	8.2	3.5	1.0	1.2	17.8
OpinionPlus	14–25 Jun 2023	1,610	34.6	16.7	13.2	13.1	7.4	9.4	3.6	0.9	1.1	17.9
2019 election	20 Oct 2019	–	31.5	16.5	13.6	13.0 (Note: 9.9% for CVP and 3.1% for BDP.)	9.8	8.5	3.6	1.0	2.5	15.0

==== Canton of the Grisons (5 seats) ====
Polling firm	Fieldwork date	Sample size	SVP/ UDC	DM/ AdC	SP/ PS	FDP/ PLR	GLP	Grüne/ Verdi/ Verda	EVP	EDU	Others	Lead
2023 election	22 Oct 2023	–	30.6	23.9	17.8	13.7	6.3	5.2	1.0	1.2	0.3	6.7
OpinionPlus	6–16 Sep 2023	1,512	30.4	25.5	17.4	13.4	6.9	4.5	1.0	0.5	0.4	4.9
2019 election	20 Oct 2019	–	29.9	25.4 (Note: 16.3% for CVP and 9.1% for BDP.)	17.1	13.6	8.3	5.5	–	–	0.2	4.5

==== Canton of Lucerne (9 seats) ====
Polling firm	Fieldwork date	Sample size	DM	SVP	FDP	SP	Grüne	GLP	Others	Lead
2023 election	22 Oct 2023	–	27.9	26.5	15.4	13.7	8.1	6.5	1.9	1.4
OpinionPlus	6–16 Sep 2023	1,338	25.0	28.0	15.1	14.0	10.0	6.8	1.1	3.0
2019 election	20 Oct 2019	–	25.5	24.7	15.6	13.5	12.2	7.1	1.3	0.8

==== Canton of Solothurn (6 seats) ====
Polling firm	Fieldwork date	Sample size	SVP	FDP	SP	DM	Grüne	GLP	EVP	MASS- VOLL	Others	Lead
2023 election	22 Oct 2023	–	28.7	17.4	17.2	17.9	9.3	6.0	1.5	2.0	–	10.8
OpinionPlus	Aug/Sep 2023	>1,100	29.1	17.8	19.2	17.0	6.8	7.2	1.2	1.3	0.4	9.9
2019 election	20 Oct 2019	–	25.9	18.5	18.4	16.2 (Note: 14.2% for CVP and 2.0% for BDP.)	11.4	6.8	1.2	–	1.5	7.4

==== Canton of Thurgau (6 seats) ====
Polling firm	Fieldwork date	Sample size	SVP	DM	SP	FDP	Grüne	GLP	EDU	EVP	Lead
2023 election	22 Oct 2023	–	40.3	15.3	10.2	10.7	8.5	6.6	2.8	2.4	25.0
OpinionPlus	6–16 Sep 2023	1,255	39.8	14.7	13.1	11.3	8.3	7.6	2.6	2.6	25.1
2019 election	20 Oct 2019	–	36.7	15.0 (Note: 12.7% for CVP and 2.3% for BDP.)	12.6	11.5	10.6	8.1	2.8	2.7	21.7

==== Canton of Valais (8 seats) ====
Polling firm	Fieldwork date	Sample size	LC/ DM	Neo	UDC/ SVP	PLR/ FDP	PS/ SP	Verts/ Grüne	PVL/ GLP	Others	Lead
2023 election	22 Oct 2023	–	30.4	5.0	24.5	14.7	14.3	8.4	2.0	0.7	5.9
Sotomo	19–27 Sep 2023	3,367	28.5	5.8	21.8	16.0	16.6	7.1	1.3	2.9	6.7
2019 election	20 Oct 2019	–	27.5	7.3	19.8	16.5	15.1	10.6	1.0	1.5	7.7

==== Canton of Zurich (36 seats) ====
Polling firm	Fieldwork date	Sample size	SVP	SP	Grüne	GLP	FDP	DM	EVP	AL	EDU	Others	Lead
2023 election	22 Oct 2023	–	27.4	21.1	9.9	12.4	12.5	8.1	2.8	1.0	1.5	2.5	6.3
OpinionPlus	30 Aug – 10 Sep 2023	917	29.6	20.4	9.9	12.6	13.8	6.4	3.2	1.6	1.7	0.8	9.2
OpinionPlus	18–20 Jul 2023	867	29.1	20.1	9.1	13.5	14.0	6.6	3.4	1.6	1.4	1.2	9.0
2019 election	20 Oct 2019	–	26.7	17.3	14.1	14.0	13.7	6.0 (Note: 4.4% for CVP and 1.6% for BDP.)	3.3	1.9	1.6	1.4	9.4

=== Council of States polling ===
==== Canton of Aargau (2 seats) ====
Polling firm	Fieldwork date	Sample size	Burkart FDP	Giezendanner SVP	Binder DM	Suter SP	Kälin Grüne	Portmann GLP	Studer EVP	Lead
2023 election (first round)	22 Oct 2023	–	52.2	42.6	23.9	25.6	19.0	10.2	8.1	9.6
OpinionPlus	6–16 Sep 2023	1,458	45	31	27	28	22	16	7	14
OpinionPlus	14–25 Jun 2023	1,610	38.3	25.6	20.7	15.8	17.8	12.3	4.4	12.7
2019 election (first round)	20 Oct 2019	–	43.4	38.2 (Knecht)	30.4 (Note: 19.3 for Binder (CVP) and 11.4 for Bally (BDP).)	29.1 (Wermuth)	21.4 (Müri)	12.2 (Flach)	5.2 (Frauchiger)	5.2

==== Canton of Berne (2 seats) ====
Polling firm	Fieldwork date	Sample size	Wasserfallen SP/PS	Pulver G/V	Salzmann SVP/UDC	L. Hess DM/LC	S. Hess FDP/PLR	Grossen GLP/PVL	Jost EVP/PEV	Lead
2023 election (first round)	22 Oct 2023	–	42.6	26.1	42.4	11.1	25.0	19.6	7.6	0.2
LeeWas	19–20 Sep 2023	5,232	34	25	42	17	14	20	6	8
2019 election (first round)	20 Oct 2019	–	40.0 (Stöckli)	39.3 (Rytz)	39.2	24.9 (Simon) (Note: (BDP/PBD).)	20.3 (Markwalder)	15.8 (Bertschy)	7.9 (Streiff)	0.7

==== Canton of the Grisons (2 seats) ====
Polling firm	Fieldwork date	Sample size	Engler DM	Schmid FDP	Others	Lead
2023 election (first round)	22 Oct 2023	–	77.2	67.8	11.5	9.4
OpinionPlus	6–16 Sep 2023	1,512	37	35	12	2
2019 election (first round)	20 Oct 2019	–	52.8	46.8	(Note: 26.8 for Pult (SP), 17.7 for Favre-Accola (SVP), 12.5 for Danuser (GLP), 10.6 for others.)	6.0

==== Canton of Lucerne (2 seats) ====
Polling firm	Fieldwork date	Sample size	Müller FDP	Gmür DM	Haller SVP	Spring Grüne	Roth SP	Fischer GLP	Lead
2023 election (first round)	22 Oct 2023	–	53.7	50.7	23.5	21.2	22.1	7.2	3.0
OpinionPlus	6–16 Sep 2023	1,338	33.0	28.0	17.0	10.0	14.0	14.0	5.0
2019 election (first round)	20 Oct 2019	–	50.2	41.9	29.3 (Grüter)	23.2 (Frey)	22.7	7.1 (Graber)	8.3

==== Canton of Solothurn (2 seats) ====
Polling firm	Fieldwork date	Sample size	Bischof DM	Roth SP	Imark SVP	Wettstein Grüne	Ankli FDP	Künzli GLP	Lead
2023 election (first round)	22 Oct 2023	–	53.4	35.4	33.8	16.7	29.6	10.1	18.0
OpinionPlus	Aug/Sep 2023	>1,100	31.4	16.1	19.4	10.8	24.6	9.5	6.8
2019 election (first round)	20 Oct 2019	–	53.1	47.1 (Zanetti)	30.8	24.9	22.6 (Nünlist)	–	6.0

==== Canton of Thurgau (2 seats) ====
Polling firm	Fieldwork date	Sample size	Häberli- Koller DM	Stark SVP	Leuthold GLP	Coray Ind.	Vietze FDP	Spiri Aufrecht	Lead
2023 election (first round)	22 Oct 2023	–	63.5	57.2	23.9	4.5	21.9	9.2	6.3
OpinionPlus	6–16 Sep 2023	1,255	49	42	22	6	28	8	7
2019 election (first round)	20 Oct 2019	–	61.6	53.3	19.7 (Fisch)	6.2	–	–	8.3

==== Canton of Valais (2 seats) ====
Polling firm	Fieldwork date	Sample size	Rieder LC/DM	Maret LC/DM	Bogiqi PS/SP	Nantermod PLR/FDP	Dessimoz LV/G	Addor UDC/SVP	Alpiger PS/SP	Jansen PVL/GLP	Salzmann PVL/GLP	Lead
2023 election (first round)	22 Oct 2023	–	48.7	39.9	10.4	23.2	12.6	21.6	11.5	6.2	4.9	8.8
Sotomo	19–27 Sep 2023	3,367	48	35	10	26	12	21	9	5	5	13
2019 election (first round)	20 Oct 2019	–	38.9	33.8	30.9 (Reynard)	21.9	21.1 (Wolf)	27.3 (Note: 14.2% for Fauchère (UDC) & 13.1% for Kreuzer (SVP).)	–	–	–	5.1

==== Canton of Zurich (2 seats) ====
Polling firm	Fieldwork date	Sample size	Jositsch SP	Sauter FDP	Rutz SVP	Leupi Grüne	Moser GLP	Kutter DM	Gugger EVP	Lead
2023 election (first round)	22 Oct 2023	–	51.8	26.4	33.9	21.3	23.1	14.6	7.2	17.9
LeeWas	19–20 Sep 2023	7,897	52	21	36	20	20	16	5	16
OpinionPlus	30 Aug – 10 Sep 2023	1,110	47	29	31	17	22	28	8	16
OpinionPlus	10–18 Jul 2023	1,118	45	23	27	12	14	24	5	18
2019 election (first round)	20 Oct 2019	–	52.6	34.4 (Noser)	26.1 (Köppel)	23.1 (Schlatter)	19.5	4.9 (Barandun)	4.3	18.2

== Seat predictions ==
=== National Council ===
Firm	Publication	SVP/ UDC	SP/ PS	FDP/ PLR	Grüne/ Verts	DM/ LC	GLP/ PVL	EVP/ PEV	PST-Sol	EDU/ UDF	Lega	MCG	Others	Lead
2023 election	22 Oct 2023	62	41	28	23	29	10	2	0	2	1	2	0	21
NZZ	7 Oct 2023	56	42	31	23	30	11	2	1	2	1	1	–	14
Tamedia	23 Sep 2023	57	40	30	24	29	13	7						17
CH Media	2 Sep 2023	55	39	31	24	32	12	2	1	2	2	–	–	16
2019 election	20 Oct 2019	53	39	29	28	28	16	3	2	1	1	0	0	14

=== Council of States ===
Firm	Publication	DM/ LC	FDP/ PLR	SP/ PS	SVP/ UDC	Grüne/ Verts	GLP/ PVL	MCG	Ind.	Lead
2023 election	22 Oct – 19 Nov 2023	15	11	9	6	3	1	1	0	4
Tamedia	30 Sep 2023	14	15	6	6	4	–	–	1	1
SRG	20 Sep 2023	13–14	14–15	5–6	6–8	4–5	–	–	1	0–2
2019 election	20 Oct – 24 Nov 2019	13	12	9	6	5	–	–	1	1

== Leadership polling ==
=== Federal councilors approval ===
Federal councilors are elected indirectly by the Federal Assembly, but opinion polls are held regularly to gauge their popular approval.

==== Average rating ====
The table below lists opinion polling on leader ratings, on a 1–6 scale: 1 would stand for "absolutely inadequate", whereas 6 would stand for "excellent".

Polling firm	Fieldwork date	Sample size	Maurer SVP/UDC	Sommaruga SP/PS	Berset SP/PS	Parmelin SVP/UDC	Cassis FDP/PLR	Amherd DM/LC	Keller- Sutter FDP/PLR	Rösti SVP/UDC	Baume- Schneider SP/PS
LeeWas	19–20 Sep 2023	29,081	–	–	4.09	3.69	3.49	4.09	3.94	3.99	3.31
LeeWas	10–11 Jul 2023	25,688	–	–	4.15	3.77	3.57	4.17	3.89	4.02	3.42
LeeWas	15–17 Feb 2023	27,668	–	–	3.92	3.84	3.69	4.22	4.09	3.89	3.64
	7 Dec 2022		Albert Rösti and Élisabeth Baume-Schneider are elected to the Federal Council								
LeeWas	15–16 Aug 2022	26,298	3.81	3.66	4.11	3.84	3.51	4.02	4.05	–	–
LeeWas	8–9 Dec 2021	19,324	3.75	4.00	4.33	4.14	4.23	4.12	3.51	–	–

==== Approval ====
===== Swiss People's Party councilors =====
Polling firm	Fieldwork date	Sample size	Question wording	Ueli Maurer (SVP/UDC)				Guy Parmelin (SVP/UDC)				Albert Rösti (SVP/UDC)			
Polling firm	Fieldwork date	Sample size	Question wording	Yes	No	Neither	Net	Yes	No	Neither	Net	Yes	No	Neither	Net
Sotomo	21–23 Oct 2023	23,207	Sympathy	–				34	30	36	+4	48	28	24	+20
Sotomo	22 Sep – 5 Oct 2023	31,850	Sympathy	–				32	31	37	+1	45	28	27	+17
Sotomo	4–25 Aug 2023	40,889	Sympathy	–				36	28	36	+8	45	28	27	+17
Sotomo	8–22 Jun 2023	25,216	Sympathy	–				34	31	35	+3	43	31	26	+12
Sotomo	20 Feb – 5 Mar 2023	27,058	Sympathy	–				39	27	35	+12	45	29	26	+16
	7 Dec 2022			Albert Rösti is elected to the Federal Council											
Sotomo	26 Sep – 7 Oct 2022	21,038	Sympathy	38	39	22	−1	37	28	35	+9	–			
Sotomo	29 Sep – 3 Oct 2021	27,976	Sympathy	46	35	20	−11	42	24	34	+18	–			

===== Social Democratic councilors =====
Polling firm	Fieldwork date	Sample size	Question wording	Simonetta Sommaruga (SP/PS)				Alain Berset (SP/PS)				Élisabeth Baume-Schneider (SP/PS)			
Polling firm	Fieldwork date	Sample size	Question wording	Yes	No	Neither	Net	Yes	No	Neither	Net	Yes	No	Neither	Net
Sotomo	21–23 Oct 2023	23,207	Sympathy	–				60	22	18	+38	43	29	28	+14
Sotomo	22 Sep – 5 Oct 2023	31,850	Sympathy	–				58	25	17	+33	42	28	30	+14
Sotomo	4–25 Aug 2023	40,889	Sympathy	–				59	24	17	+35	43	28	29	+15
Sotomo	8–22 Jun 2023	25,216	Sympathy	–				52	27	21	+25	45	25	30	+20
Sotomo	20 Feb – 5 Mar 2023	27,058	Sympathy	–				55	26	18	+29	51	19	30	+32
	7 Dec 2022			Élisabeth Baume-Schneider is elected to the Federal Council											
Sotomo	26 Sep – 7 Oct 2022	21,038	Sympathy	48	32	20	+16	54	27	19	+27	–			
Sotomo	29 Sep – 3 Oct 2021	27,976	Sympathy	52	31	17	+21	59	26	15	+33	–			

===== FDP.The Liberals councilors =====
Polling firm	Fieldwork date	Sample size	Question wording	Ignazio Cassis (FDP/PLR)				Karin Keller-Sutter (FDP/PLR)			
Polling firm	Fieldwork date	Sample size	Question wording	Yes	No	Neither	Net	Yes	No	Neither	Net
Sotomo	21–23 Oct 2023	23,207	Sympathy	29	38	33	−9	42	28	30	+14
Sotomo	22 Sep – 5 Oct 2023	31,850	Sympathy	27	40	33	−13	41	30	29	+11
Sotomo	4–25 Aug 2023	40,889	Sympathy	30	38	32	−8	41	30	29	+11
Sotomo	8–22 Jun 2023	25,216	Sympathy	36	30	34	−4	41	29	30	+12
Sotomo	20 Feb – 5 Mar 2023	27,058	Sympathy	33	34	34	−1	43	27	30	+16
Sotomo	26 Sep – 7 Oct 2022	21,038	Sympathy	29	39	33	−10	40	26	33	+14
Sotomo	29 Sep – 3 Oct 2021	27,976	Sympathy	23	40	37	−17	46	25	30	+21

===== The Centre councilors =====
Polling firm	Fieldwork date	Sample size	Question wording	Viola Amherd (DM/LC)			
Polling firm	Fieldwork date	Sample size	Question wording	Yes	No	Neither	Net
Sotomo	21–23 Oct 2023	23,207	Sympathy	61	15	24	+46
Sotomo	22 Sep – 5 Oct 2023	31,850	Sympathy	59	16	25	+43
Sotomo	4–25 Aug 2023	40,889	Sympathy	58	18	24	+40
Sotomo	8–22 Jun 2023	25,216	Sympathy	57	16	27	+41
Sotomo	20 Feb – 5 Mar 2023	27,058	Sympathy	59	16	25	+43
Sotomo	26 Sep – 7 Oct 2022	21,038	Sympathy	49	22	28	+27
Sotomo	29 Sep – 3 Oct 2021	27,976	Sympathy	57	14	28	+43

=== Satisfaction ===
The question was "How satisfied are you with the work of the Parliament/Federal Council?"

Polling firm	Fieldwork date	Sample size	Parliament				Federal Council			
Polling firm	Fieldwork date	Sample size	Yes	No	Neither	Net	Yes	No	Neither	Net
LeeWas	19–20 Sep 2023	29,081	42	57	1	−15	49	50	1	−1
LeeWas	10–11 Jul 2023	25,688	48	50	2	−2	54	45	1	+9
LeeWas	15–17 Feb 2023	27,668	50	49	1	+1	55	44	1	+11
LeeWas	15–16 Aug 2022	26,298	46	53	1	−7	50	49	1	+1
LeeWas	8–9 Dec 2021	19,324	56	43	1	+13	65	34	1	+31

== Federal Council ==
As federal councilors are elected indirectly by the Federal Assembly, all the polls in this section are hypotheticals to gauge popular support.

=== Partisan composition ===
Sotomo polls allowed for multiple responses.

Polling firm	Fieldwork date	Sample size	Magic formula (Note: 2 SVP, 2 SP, 2 FDP, 1 DM)	Grüne+1 SP−1 (Note: 2 SVP, 2 FDP, 1 SP, 1 DM, 1 Grüne)	Grüne+1 FDP−1 (Note: 2 SVP, 1 FDP, 2 SP, 1 DM, 1 Grüne)	Grüne+1 DM−1 (Note: 2 SVP, 2 FDP, 2 SP, 1 Grüne)	GLP+1 SP−1 (Note: 2 SVP, 2 FDP, 1 SP, 1 GLP, 1 DM)	GLP+1 FDP−1 (Note: 2 SVP, 1 FDP, 2 SP, 1 DM, 1 GLP)	GLP+1 DM−1 (Note: 2 SVP, 2 FDP, 2 SP, 1 GLP)	Grüne+1 GLP+1 SP−1, FDP−1 (Note: 2 SVP, 1 FDP, 1 SP, 1 DM, 1 Grüne, 1 GLP)	Center-left+1 Right−1 (Note: 3 Right (SVP, FDP), 4 Center-left (SP, DM, Grüne, GLP))	Center- left coalition	Center- right coalition	Bourgeois council (Note: None for the SP)	Other	Not specified
Sotomo	21–23 Oct 2023	23,207	25	6	19	–	–	–	–	9	27	–	–	13	15	6
Sotomo	22 Sep – 5 Oct 2023	31,850	23	6	20	–	–	–	–	10	26	–	–	13	16	5
LeeWas	19–20 Sep 2023	29,081	26	7	20	–	16	10	–	12	–	–	–	–	–	9
Sotomo	4–25 Aug 2023	40,889	25	7	19	–	–	–	–	10	24	–	–	14	14	5
LeeWas	10–11 Jul 2023	25,688	27	7	19	–	17	9	–	12	–	–	–	–	–	9
Sotomo	8–22 Jun 2023	25,216	22	8	20	–	–	–	–	11	23	–	–	14	17	4
Sotomo	20 Feb – 5 Mar 2023	27,058	22	10	20	–	–	–	–	11	23	–	–	14	14	4
LeeWas	15–17 Feb 2023	27,668	19	8	17	–	19	12	–	14	–	–	–	–	–	11
LeeWas	15–16 Aug 2022	26,298	18	9	16	–	17	11	–	12	–	–	–	–	–	17
LeeWas	8–9 Dec 2021	19,324	28	9	22	3	5	8	2	–	–	5	11	–	–	7

=== Re-election support ===
The question is "Which of the federal councilors should be re-elected?"

Polling firm	Fieldwork date	Sample size	Maurer SVP/UDC	Sommaruga SP/PS	Berset SP/PS	Parmelin SVP/UDC	Cassis FDP/PLR	Amherd DM/LC	Keller- Sutter FDP/PLR	Rösti SVP/UDC	Baume- Schneider SP/PS	None	Don't know
LeeWas	19–20 Sep 2023	29,081	–	–	–	36	29	57	54	53	34	9	6
LeeWas	10–11 Jul 2023	25,688	–	–	–	39	32	60	53	54	38	8	6
LeeWas	15–17 Feb 2023	27,668	–	–	49	37	33	58	54	47	39	7	4
	7 Dec 2022		Albert Rösti and Élisabeth Baume-Schneider are elected to the Federal Council										
LeeWas	15–16 Aug 2022	26,298	37	43	56	40	27	53	55	–	–	7	
LeeWas	8–9 Dec 2021	19,324	34	50	64	50	27	57	56	–	–	5	

=== Successors ===
==== Socialist seat ====
Polling firm	Fieldwork date	Sample size	Jositsch	Maillard	Herzog	Pult	Aebischer	Levrat	Jans	Funiciello	Wermuth	Nordmann	Meyer	Fehr	Nussbaumer	Someone else	Not specified
LeeWas	19–20 Sep 2023	29,081	27	9	7	4	9	2	3	3	3	2	2	1	1	9	18
LeeWas	10–11 Jul 2023	25,688	24	9	8	6	4	3	3	3	3	2	2	2	1	10	20

==== Potential Green seat ====
Polling firm	Fieldwork date	Sample size	Glättli	Mazzone	Ryser	Neukom	Pulver	Zopfi	Häsler	Weichelt	Andrey	Someone else	No Green	Not specified
LeeWas	10–11 Jul 2023	25,688	7	6	4	3	3	2	1	1	1	4	48	20

==== Potential Green-liberal seat ====
Polling firm	Fieldwork date	Sample size	Moser	Bäumle	Grossen	Bertschy	Someone else	No GLP	Not specified
LeeWas	10–11 Jul 2023	25,688	9	9	8	4	4	43	23
