= 2023 Swiss federal election in Zurich =

Swiss election in Zurich

- 22 October 2023
- National Council
- All 36 of Zurich's seats in the National Council
- Turnout: 47.0% (▲2.6pp)
Party	Vote %	Seats	+/–
Swiss People's	27.4	10	0
Social Democrats	21.1	8	+1
FDP.The Liberals	12.5	5	0
Green Liberals	12.4	4	−2
Greens	9.9	4	−1
The Centre	8.1	3	+2
Evangelical People's	2.8	1	0
Federal Democrats	1.5	1	+1
This lists parties that won seats. See the complete results below.
- Council of States

Both of Zurich's seats in the Council of States
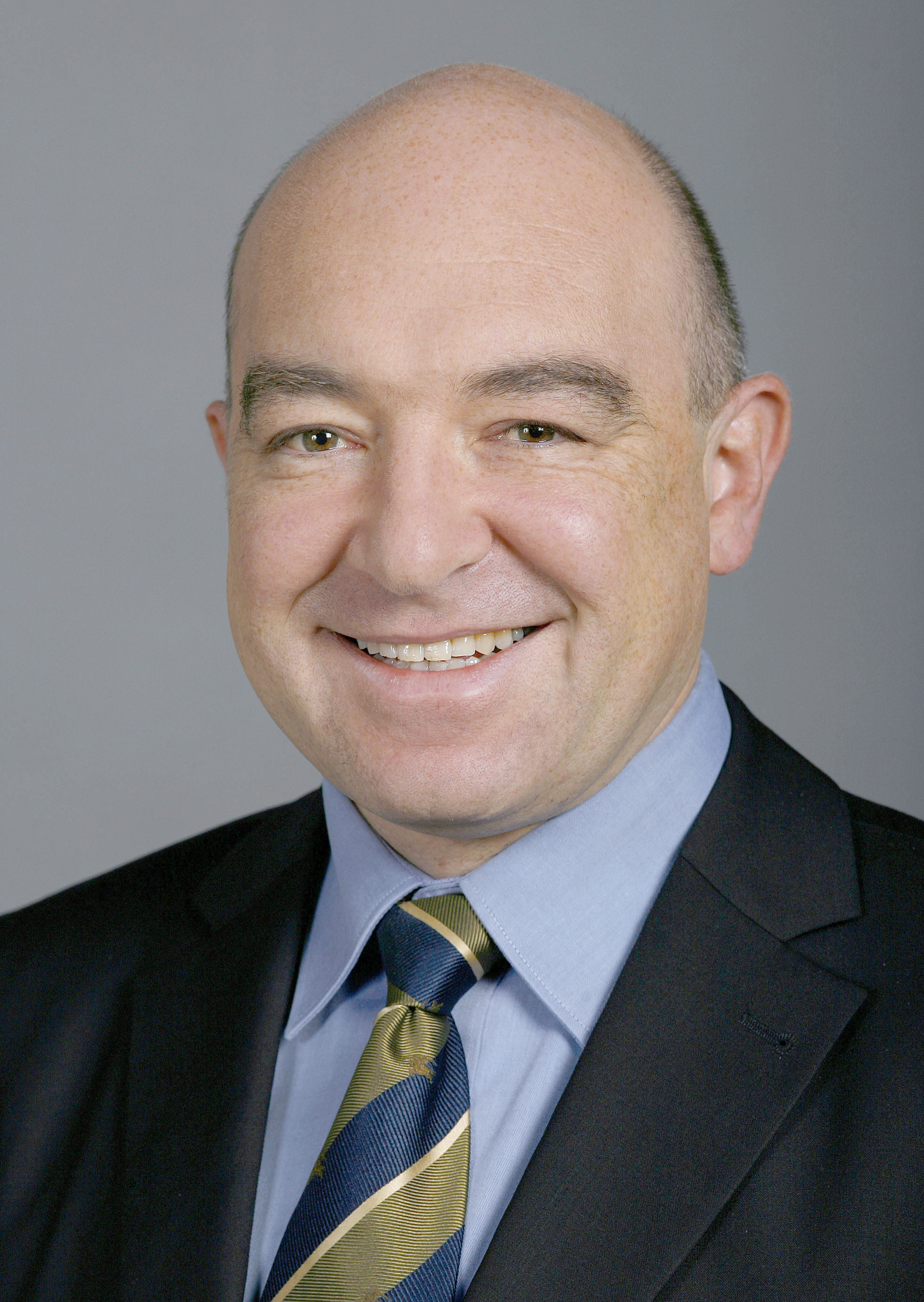

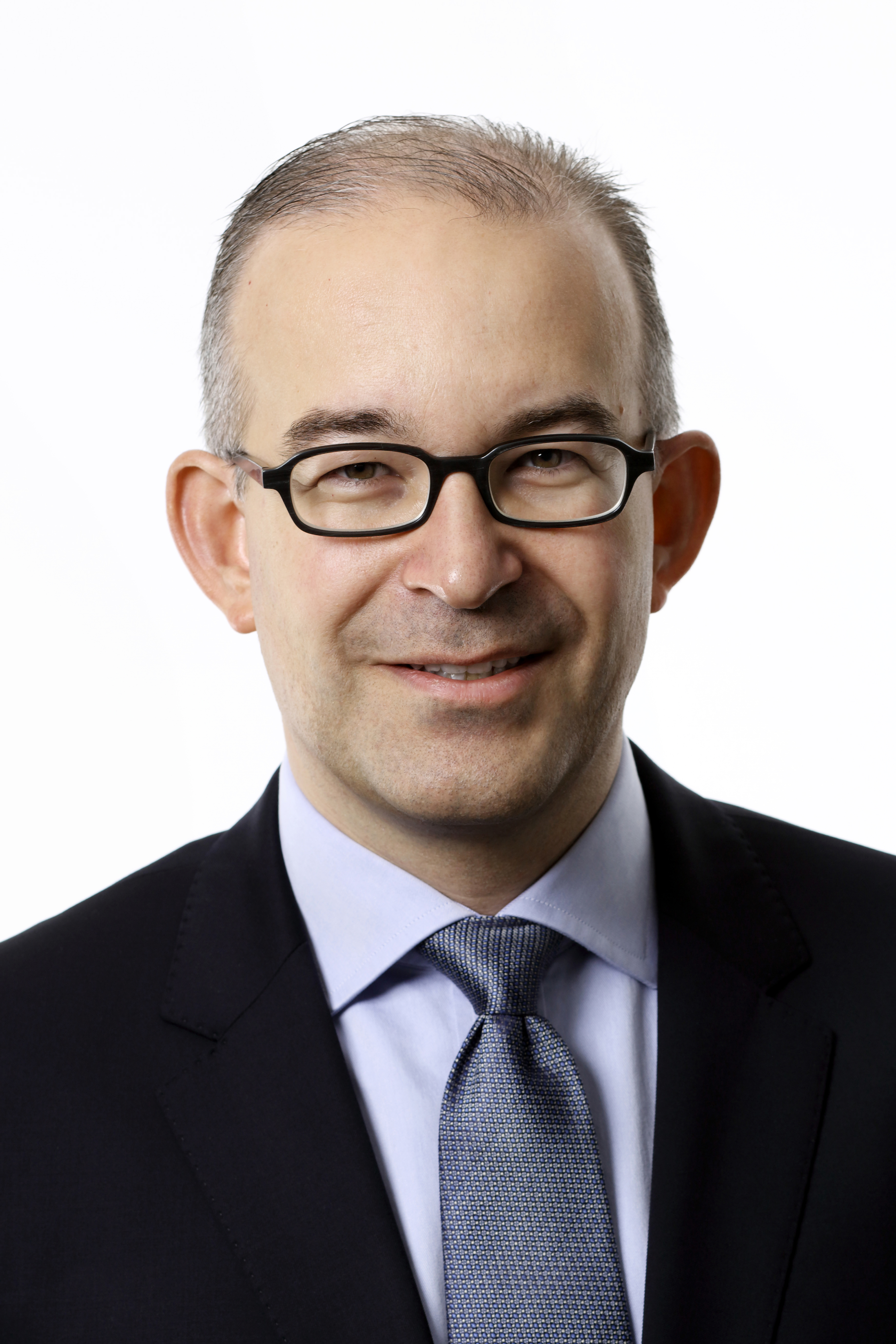

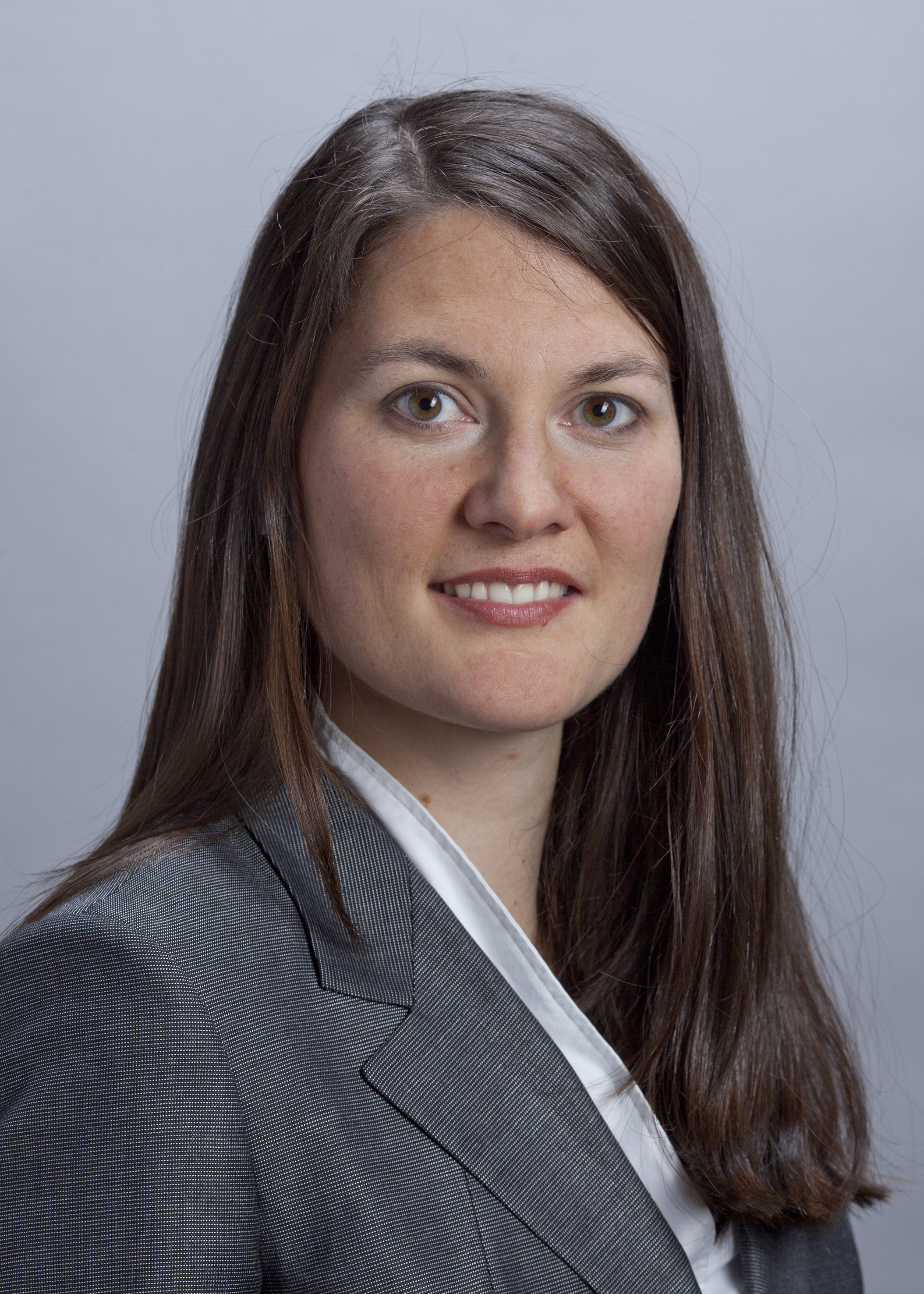
Candidate	Daniel Jositsch	Gregor Rutz	Tiana Angelina Moser
Party	Social Democrats	Swiss People's	Green Liberals
1st Round	263,775; 54.3%	154,910; 35.5%	105,604; 24.2%
2nd Round	-	159,328; 41.8%	206,493; 54.3%
Councillors before election
D. Jositsch - SP
R. Noser - FDP
Elected Councillors
D. Jositsch - SP
T.A. Moser - GLP

Swiss federal elections took place on the 22nd of October 2023 to elect the canton of Zurich's 36 members of the national council and both of its members of the council of states. The runoff for the election to the council of states took place on the 19th of November.

This election resulted in the ninth consecutive win for the Swiss People's Party (SVP) in the canton since 1991. Mirroring national results, both the Greens' and Green Liberals' vote share declined, although the Green Liberals managed to regain the council of states seat they had lost to the Liberals in 2015.

== Electoral System ==
=== National Council ===
The 36 members of the National Council for Zurich are elected from one cantonwide constituency. The system for National Council elections is the same in every multi-member canton: open-list proportional representation is used; with apparentments for allied parties and sub-apparentments for lists within parties, where apparented lists are initially counted together for seats allocation. Seats are allocated using the Hagenbach-Bischoff system with no threshold. Voters may cross out names on party lists or write names twice, split their vote between parties (a system known as panachage), or draw up their own list on a blank ballot.

Seats in the National Council are apportioned to the cantons based on their total populations (which includes children and resident foreigners who do not have the right to vote). Based on the official population count at the end of 2020, Zurich gained one seat, making it the canton with the most seats at 36.

The law regarding candidacy and voting rights in elections to the National Council are the same across all cantons. Only Swiss citizens aged 18 or over and resident in Zurich can stand or vote in Zurich. Citizens resident abroad can vote in Zurich if it was the canton in which they last resided or their canton of citizenship.

=== Council of States ===
Elections to the council of states are fully regulated by the cantons. As a "full" canton, Zurich is entitled to two members of the council. Like most cantons, Zurich uses a two-round majoritarian system. In the first round, held concurrently with the election to the national council, voters may vote for two different candidates. In order to win in the first round, a candidates name must appear on at least 50%+1 of all ballots. If one or both seats remain unfilled, a second round occurs. Unlike most two-round systems, no candidates are eliminated, rather, candidates may voluntarily withdraw (often done as part of electoral alliances) and new candidates may enter the race. This time voters may vote for as many candidates as there are seats available (1 or 2). The one or two candidates with the most votes win in the second round, achieving the same effect as first past the post or plurality block voting.

== Incumbents not standing for re-election ==
National Councillors
Member	First elected	Party	Reason
Doris Fiala	2007	FDP	Retirement.
Roger Köppel	2015	SVP	To focus on his career as editor-in-chief of the newspaper Die Weltwoche.
Angelo Barrile	2015	SP	Re-evaluation of lifestyle and career.

Councillors of State
Member	First elected	Party	Reason
Ruedi Noser	2015	FDP	To focus on his business the Noser Group and reduce workload.

== Opinion Polling ==
National Council
Polling firm	Fieldwork date	Sample size	SVP	SP	Grüne	GLP	FDP	DM	EVP	AL	EDU	Others	Lead
2023 election	22 Oct 2023	–	27.4	21.1	9.9	12.4	12.5	8.1	2.8	1.0	1.5	2.5	6.3
OpinionPlus	30 Aug – 10 Sep 2023	917	29.6	20.4	9.9	12.6	13.8	6.4	3.2	1.6	1.7	0.8	9.2
OpinionPlus	18–20 Jul 2023	867	29.1	20.1	9.1	13.5	14.0	6.6	3.4	1.6	1.4	1.2	9.0
2019 election	20 Oct 2019	–	26.7	17.3	14.1	14.0	13.7	6.0 (Note: 4.4% for CVP and 1.6% for BDP.)	3.3	1.9	1.6	1.4	9.4

Council of States - First Round
Polling firm	Fieldwork date	Sample size	Jositsch SP	Sauter FDP	Rutz SVP	Leupi Grüne	Moser GLP	Kutter DM	Gugger EVP
2023 election	22 Oct 2023	–	54.3	27.6	33.5	24.2	22.4	15.3	7.6
LeeWas	19–20 Sep 2023	7,897	52	21	36	20	20	16	5
OpinionPlus	30 Aug – 10 Sep 2023	1,110	47	29	31	17	22	28	8
OpinionPlus	10–18 Jul 2023	1,118	45	23	27	12	14	24	5

== Results ==
=== National Council ===
Seating diagram of the parties.

Overall, the results in Zurich differed very little from the nationwide results. The Green Liberals and Social Democrats performed much better, while the Centre performed much worse. The SVP dominated the countryside, winning 153 of 160 communes in Zurich, while the Social Democrats and other left-wing parties performed the best in the cities of Zurich and Winterthur. The FDP stagnated but maintained their base along the coast of Lake Zurich. Neither left nor right wing parties secured a majority of Zurich's national council seats.

=== Council of States ===
Daniel Jositsch was victorious for the SP in the first round, however the second seat remained unfilled. Sauter, Leupi and Kutter all pulled out to avoid splitting the vote with their preferred candidate, leaving the election to Rutz of the SVP and Moser of the Green Liberals. Rutz' raw vote count changed very little between the first and second rounds, while Moser gained over 100,000 votes, showing a lack of enthusiasm for the SVP's candidate among the other right-wing parties.

Candidate	Party	R1 Votes	R1%	R2 Votes	R2%
Daniel Jositsch	SP	236,775	54.3		
Gregor Rutz	SVP	154,910	35.5	159,328	41.8
Regine Sauter	FDP	120,571	27.6		
Tiana Angelina Moser	GLP	105,604	24.2	206,493	54.3
Daniel Leupi	G	97,520	22.4		
Philipp Kutter	M	66,770	15.3		
Nik Gugger	EVP	32,941	7.6		
