= Doris Fiala =

Swiss politician

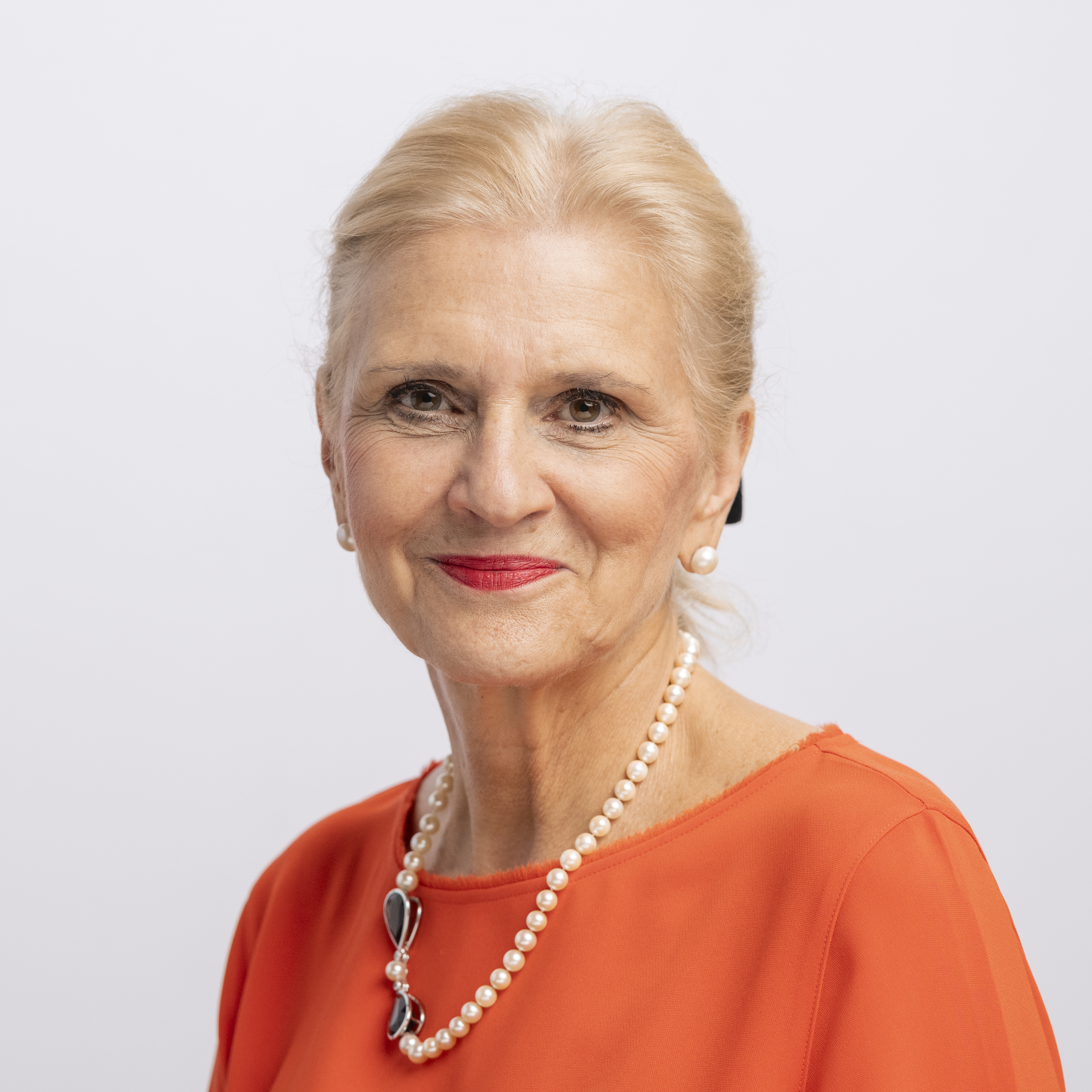
- Official portrait, 2023

Member of the National Council (Switzerland)
- In office 3 December 2007 – 3 December 2023
- Constituency: Canton of Zürich

President of The Liberals Women
- In office 2017 – May 2020
- Succeeded by: Susanne Vincenz-Stauffacher

Personal details
- Born: Doris Yvonne Goldiger; 29 January 1957 (age 69) Zürich, Switzerland
- Spouse: Jan Fiala (m. 1981; died 2019)
- Domestic partner: Armin Walpen (since 2021)
- Children: 3
- Occupation: Businesswoman, public relations consultant
- Website: Official website Parliament website

Doris Yvonne Fiala (née Goldiger; German pronunciation: [fiˈaːla] Czech pronunciation: [ˈfjala]; born 29 January 1957) is a Swiss politician who served on the National Council (Switzerland) for The Liberals between 2007 and 2023. Concurrently, she served as president of The Liberals Women between 2017 and 2020. Fiala has also been a member of the Parliamentary Assembly of the Council of Europe, where she chaired the committee on Migration, Refugees and Displaced Persons from 2018 to 2020. She was also referred to as a Swiss version of Sarah Palin.

== Life ==
Fiala was born Doris Yvonne Goldiger on 29 January 1957 in Zürich, Switzerland. After completing commercial school she pursued continuing education in travel and nutrition studies at a variety of institutions such as École hôtelière de Lausanne (EHL) and the Institute for Nutrition Zürich.

Fiala is the owner and consultant of FIALA Risk and Opportunity Management which is primarily active in the field of public relations, which she founded in 2000.

== Political career ==
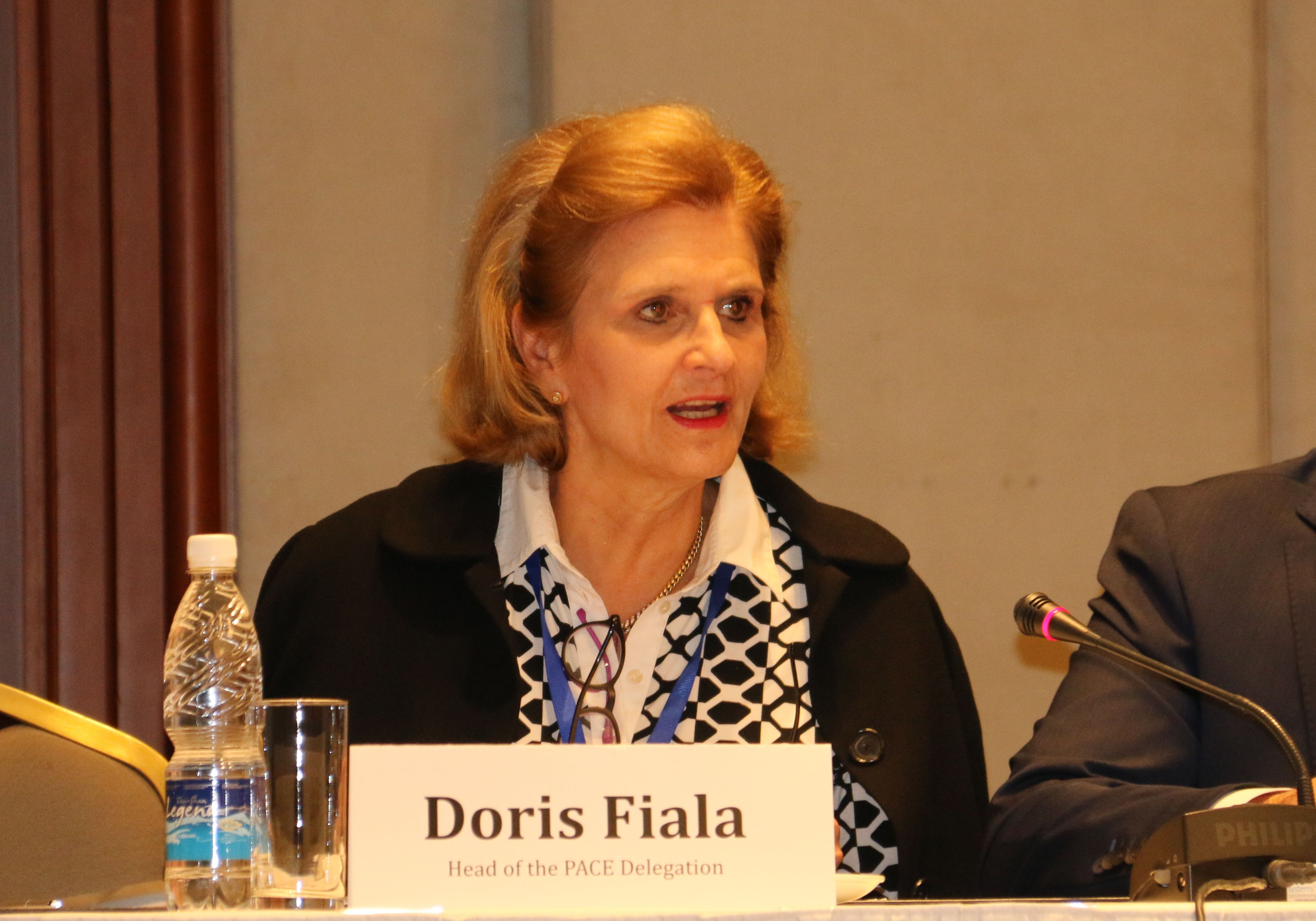
Fiala in 2017 as head of the PACE delegation in Bishkek, Kyrgyzstan.

Between 2000 and 2007, Fiala served as a member of the city parliament of Zürich. There she succeeded Ruedi Noser defeating Filippo Leutenegger. Previously, she was the president of the Free Democratic Party of Zürich. During the 2007 Swiss federal election, Fiala was elected to National Council (Switzerland) and held this position throughout 2023. She announced her resignation in May 2020.

== Personal life ==
Fiala was married to Jan Fiala (1949–2019), an engineer, who fled Czechoslovakia in the 1960s, settling in Switzerland. He died of cancer in December 2019. They had three children. Since 2016, she splits her time between Samedan and Zürich. Since 2021, she is in a domestic relationship with Armin Walpen, former general director of Swiss Radio and Television.

== See also ==
- List of members of the National Council of Switzerland, 2011–2015
- List of members of the National Council of Switzerland, 2007–2011
- List of members of the National Council of Switzerland, 2019–23
