= Susanne Vincenz-Stauffacher =

Swiss attorney and politician

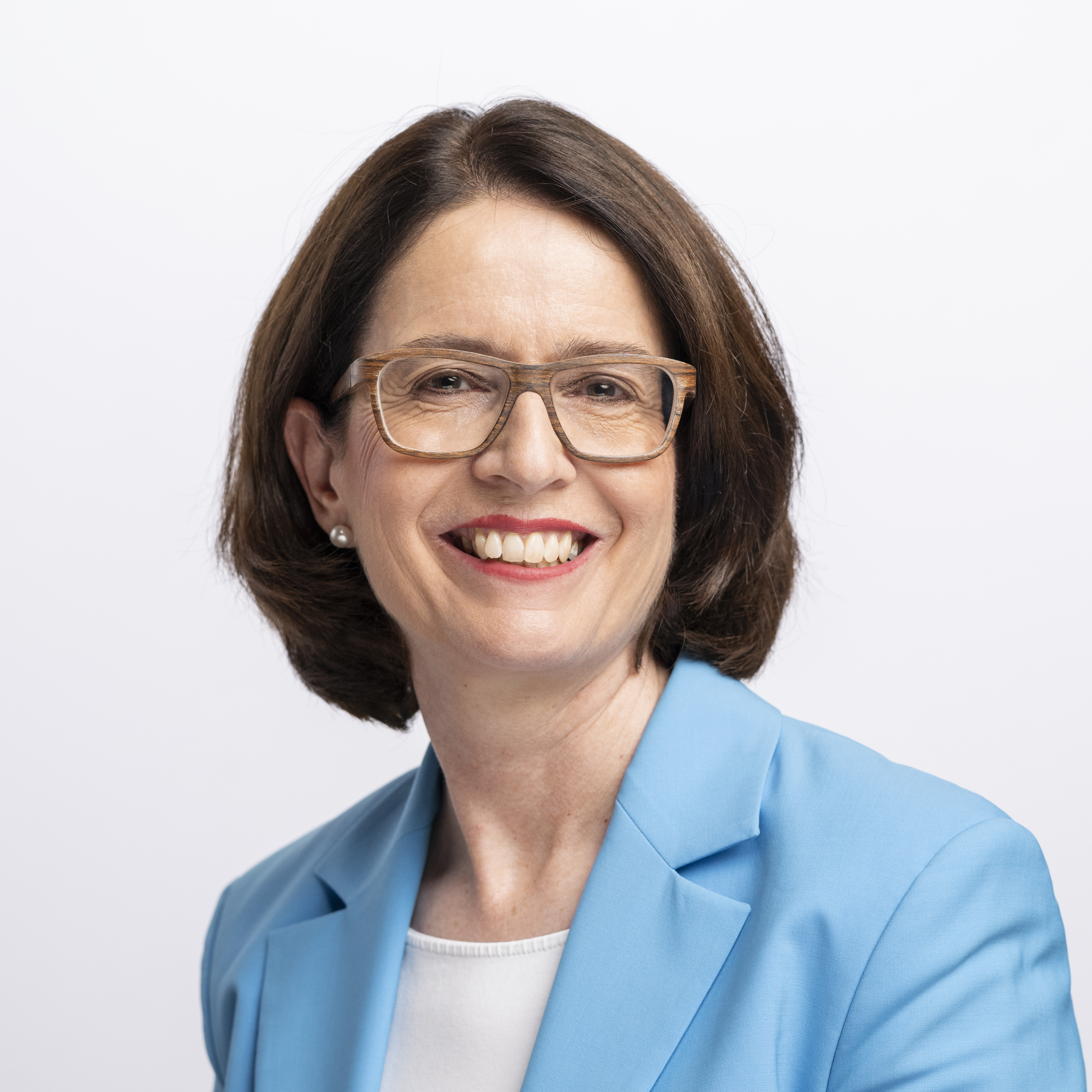
- Official portrait, 2023

Member of the National Council (Switzerland)
- Incumbent
- Assumed office 2 December 2019
- Constituency: Canton of St. Gallen

Member of the Cantonal Council of St. Gallen
- In office 2018–2020

Personal details
- Born: Susanne Stauffacher; 21 January 1967 (age 59) Wattwil, St. Gallen, Switzerland
- Party: The Liberals
- Spouse: Reto Vincenz
- Children: 2
- Education: University of St. Gallen (Licentiate)
- Occupation: Attorney, politician
- Website: Official website (in German)

Susanne Vincenz, stylized Vincenz-Stauffacher (née Stauffacher; born 21 January 1967), is a Swiss attorney, notary public and politician. She currently serves as member of the National Council (Switzerland) for The Liberals since 2019. Since 2025, Vincenz serves as co-President of The Liberals. From 2020 to 2025, Vincenz served as the president of The Liberals Women Switzerland. She previously served on the Cantonal Council of St. Gallen for the St. Gallen constituency from 2018 to 2020. In 2022, she was briefly nominated for the seat in the Council of States (Switzerland) which was later accepted by Esther Friedli.

== Early life and education ==
Vincenz was born Susanne Stauffacher on 21 January 1967 at Wattwil in the Toggenburg region of St. Gallen. In 1990, she graduated with a Licentiate, in Jurisprudence from the University of St. Gallen. She was admitted to the bar in 1992. In 2013, she completed professional studies as Collaborative Lawyer SVCL.

== Career ==
In 1993, Vincenz opened her independent law practice (Vincenz & Dornier), in St. Gallen and is currently also a notary public. Between 2003 and 2016 she also served as expert judge at the insurance court of St. Gallen and as ombudsman of age and disability. Since 2018, she is also serving in this position for the cantons Appenzell-Innerrhoden and Appenzell-Ausserrhoden. Additionally, she also serves as the president of the victim help association for these cantons.

== Politics ==
Vincenz served in the Cantonal Council of St. Gallen between 2018 and 2020. In the 2019 Swiss federal election, she was elected into National Council (Switzerland) for The Liberals. She currently serves on several commissions including; environment, urban studies and energy; pardon and court commissions. She is also a member of the delegation for international relations to the Principality of Liechtenstein as well as deputy of the immunity commission. She was the successor of Doris Fiala as president of The Liberals Women. In October 2025, Vincenz was elected co-President of her party together with Benjamin Mühlemann, succeeding Thierry Burkart.

== Personal life ==
She is married to Reto Vincenz and has two daughters. They reside in Abtwil.
