= Aebischer =

Aebischer is a surname. Notable people with the surname include:

- David Aebischer (born 1978), Swiss ice-hockey player
- Matthias Aebischer (born 1967), Swiss journalist and politician
- Michel Aebischer (born 1997), Swiss footballer
- Patrick Aebischer (born 1954), Swiss neuroscientist and college president
