= Grand Council of Valais =

Parliament of the canton of Valais, Switzerland

Grand Council of Valais Grand Conseil du canton du Valais

Type
- Type: Unicameral

Leadership
- President: Patricia Constantin, PS/SP since 14 April 2025
- 1st Vice President: Céline Dessimoz, Greens since 14 April 2025
- 2nd Vice President: Didier Morard, FDP/PLR since 14 April 2025

Structure
- Political groups: The Centre (42) FDP/PLR (27) SVP/UDC (26) SP/PS (20) Greens (8) NEO (7)

Elections
- Last election: 2 March 2025
- Next election: 2029

The Grand Council of Valais (French: Grand Conseil [ɡʁɑ̃ kɔ̃sɛj]; German: Grosser Rat [ˈɡʁoːsɐ ˌʁaːt]) is the legislature of the canton of Valais, in Switzerland. Valais has a unicameral legislature.

== Electoral system ==
Members of the Grand Council of Valais are elected every four years. The Grand Council has 130 seats, elected through six multi-member constituencies via open-list proportional representation and preferential voting.

An additional 130 "substitute members" are elected, on separate lists, whose role it is to replace members who cannot make it to the meetings of the Grand Council.

== 2021 election ==
In the election on 7 March 2021, the Christian Democratic People's Party (PDC/CVP), which had been in power since 1857, remained the largest party, but with a historically low number of seats. The Green Party and the Social Democratic Party (PS/SP), which allied with the Christian Social Party (PCS) in Romand Valais and with the Greens in Upper Valais, gained several seats.

The classical liberal FDP.The Liberals and the national conservative Swiss People's Party remained the second- and third-largest parties, respectively.

Summary of the 7 March 2021 Valais parliamentary election results
Party	Ideology	Seats	Seats ±
Christian Democratic People's Party (PDC/CVP)	Christian democracy	48	–7
Christian Democratic Party of Romand Valais (PDCVr)	Christian democracy	27	–5
Christian Democratic People's Party of Upper Valais (CVPO)	Christian democracy	13	±0
Christian Social People's Party of Upper Valais (CSPO)	Christian democracy	8	–2
FDP.The Liberals (PLR/FDP)	Classical liberalism	27	+1
Swiss People's Party (UDC/SVP)	National conservatism	22	–1
Democratic Union of the Centre of Romand Valais (UDCVr)	National conservatism	15	–1
Swiss People's Party of Upper Valais (SVPO)	National conservatism	7	±0
Social Democratic Party (PS/SP) and Citizen's Left	Social democracy	21	+3
Socialist Party of Romand Valais (PSVr)	Social democracy	12	+3
Centre-Left - PCS (PCS)	Social democracy	4	±0
Social Democratic Party of Upper Valais (SPO)	Social democracy	3	–1
Entremont Differently (EA)	Social democracy	1	±0
Green Party (GPS)^{1}	Social democracy	1	+1
Green Party (PES)^{1}	Green politics	12	+4
Total (turnout 59.52%)		130	–
Source: Canton of Valais
Footnotes:^{1} The Green Party won 12 seats on separate lists in Romand Valais and 1 seat on a Social Democratic List in Upper Valais.
