= Municipal Council of Bern =

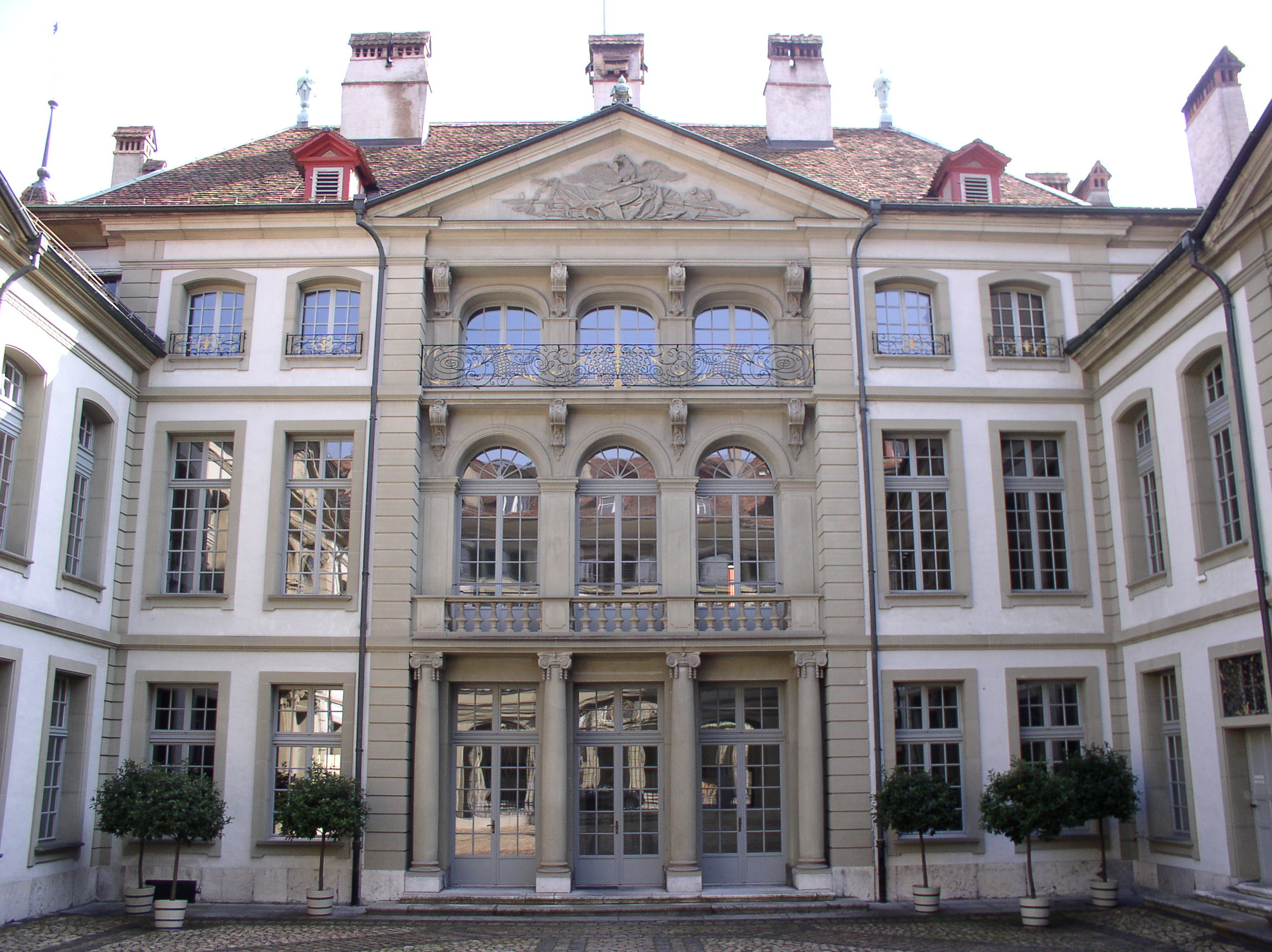
The meetings of the Bern city council are held in Erlacherhof

The Municipal Council (German: Gemeinderat) is the executive body of the city of Bern, Switzerland.

It consists of five full-time members who represent proportionally the voting population of the city of Bern; they are elected for four years, and each one leads one of the directorates of the city administration. Chairman of the municipal council is the mayor (Stadtpräsident) who is elected by the people in a plurality voting system (Majorz). The council meets weekly in the Erlacherhof. The Town Clerk (Stadtschreiber) is elected by the city council.

== See also ==
- Sanitätspolizei Bern (part of the Directorate of Security, the Environment and Energy)
- List of mayors of Bern
