= Thierry Burkart =

Swiss attorney and politician

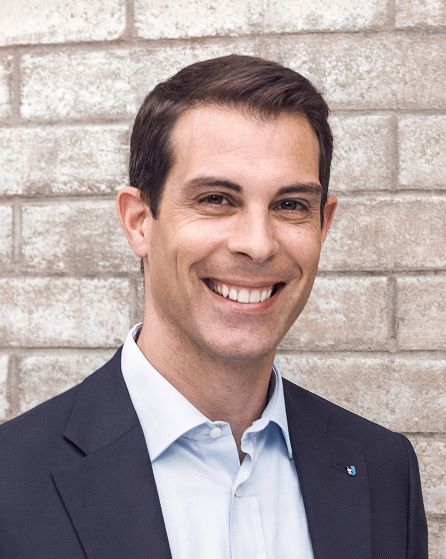
- Burkart in 2018

Member of the Council of States (Switzerland)
- Incumbent
- Assumed office 2 December 2019
- Constituency: Canton of Aargau

Member of the National Council (Switzerland)
- In office 30 November 2015 – 1 December 2019

Personal details
- Born: Thierry Paul Burkart; 21 August 1975 (age 51) Baden, Switzerland
- Citizenship: Switzerland; Italy (de facto)
- Children: 2 (stepchildren)
- Education: University of St. Gallen; University of Lausanne (Licentiate); University of Liechtenstein; Yale University (LLM)
- Occupation: Attorney, politician
- Website: Official website

Military service
- Allegiance: Switzerland
- Branch/service: Swiss Armed Forces
- Years of service: 1993 - present
- Rank: Captain

Thierry Paul Burkart (/ˈbɜːrkɑːrt/; born 21 August 1975) is a Swiss attorney and politician who currently serves as a member of the Council of States (Switzerland) for The Liberals since 2019. Concurrently Burkart serves as president of The Liberals (Switzerland). He previously served on the National Council (Switzerland) between 2015 and 2019. Further he was a member of the Grand Council of Aargau between 2001 and 2015.

== Early life and education ==
Burkart was born 21 August 1975 in Baden, Switzerland to Beatrice Burkart, a teacher, and an Italian father whom he did not know personally. He has one elder brother and one sister, however his brother was kidnapped by their father when he went back to his native Italy in 1978. His sister, Déborah Carlson-Burkart (née Burkart; b. 1969), is a board member of RUAG, N26, Visana as well as chair of Alstom. His maternal great-grandfather, Josef Burkart, served as chief justice, landamann and member of the Executive Council of Aargau.

He attended the Privatgymnasium Immensee where he completed his Matura in 1993. Then he studied Jurisprudence at the University of St. Gallen and the University of Lausanne completing his studies with a Licentiate degree in 2003 and in 2010 he was admitted to the Bar of Aargau. Between 2010 and 2012 he completed additional studies at the University of Liechtenstein with a exchange stay at Yale University graduating with a Master of Laws (LLM).

== Career ==
Between 2003 and 2005, Burkart completed a legal internship at Voser Attorneys KIG in Baden, Switzerland. He briefly worked as a tax consultant for Ernst & Young in Zürich between 2005 and 2007. Between 2007 and 2015 he worked for the law firm Bill & Isenegger where he became a partner in 2015. He returned to Voser where he stayed until 2021. Since 2021 he is a counsel at Kellerhals & Carrard in Bern, where he specializes in corporate law, trust and civil law.

Burkart is currently associated with a variety of companies. Namely he is a board member of Birchmeier Holding Ltd. (construction), ELCA Group SA (Information Technology), Bovida Real Estate Ltd. (real estate). He is also on the advisory board of Stiebel Eltron as well as member of the board of trustees of FSD (Fondation suisse de déminage) in Geneva and executive boards of The Liberals (Switzerland), FDP Campaign Association, PSI-Impuls Association, ASTAG (president), Allianz Sicherheit Schweiz, Verein Landesausstellung Svizra27. He is also the managing director of Bukart Advisory, LLC which is primarily active in public affairs.

== Politics ==
Between 1999 and 2003, Burkart served as president of the Young Liberals Aargau. In 2001, he was elected into Grand Council of Aargau, which he presided in 2014 and stayed on until 2015. Ultimately in the 2015 Swiss federal election he was elected into National Council assuming office on 30 November 2015. Since 2 December 2019 he serves as member of the Council of States and concurrently as president of The Liberals between 2021 and 2025.

In June 2025, Burkhart announced he would step down as president of The Liberals in October. He was succeeded by Benjamin Mühlemann and Susanne Vincenz-Stauffacher as co-presidents.

== Personal life ==
Today he resides in Lengnau, Switzerland.
