= Regine Sauter =

Swiss politician (born 1966)

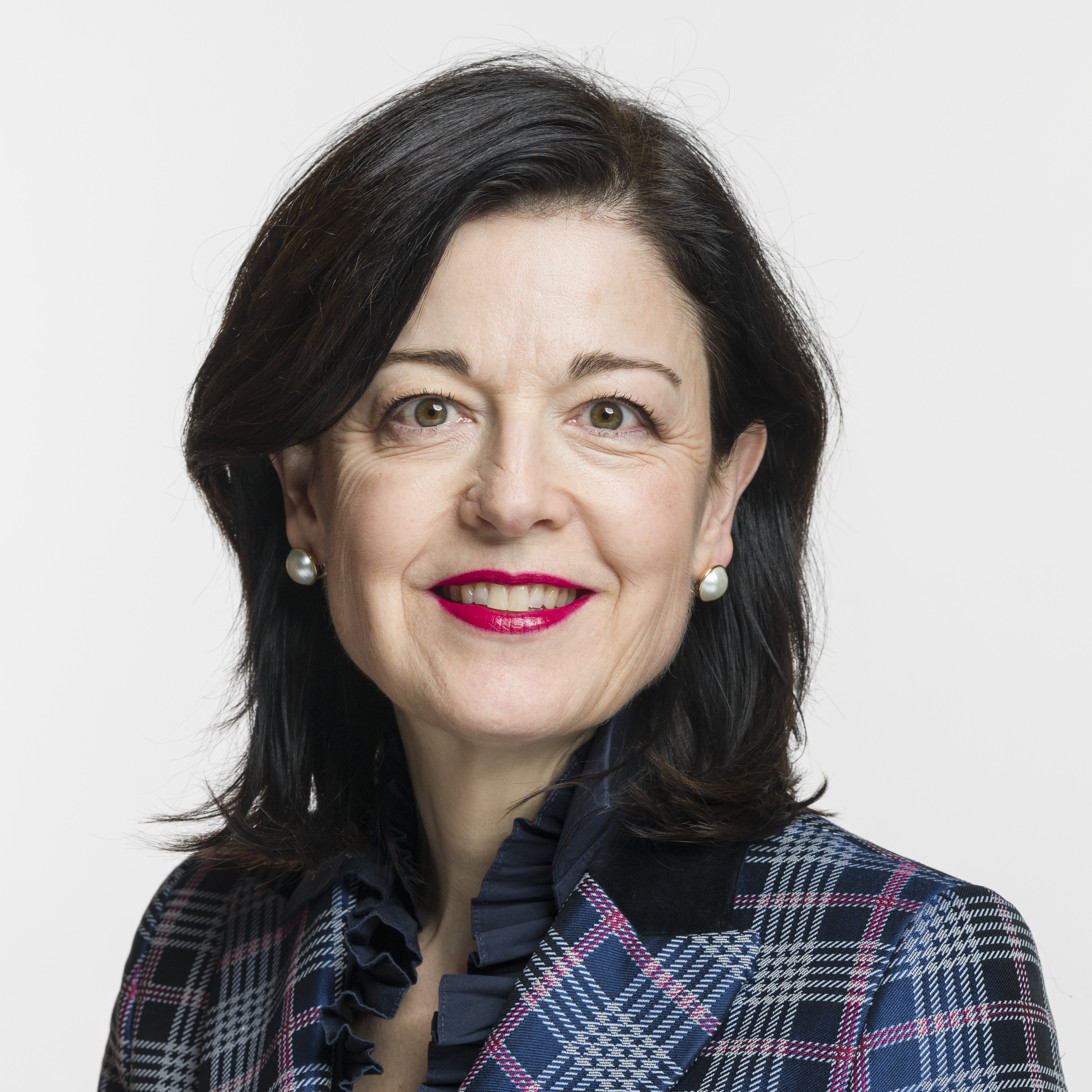
- Regine Sauter (2019)

Member of the National Council (Switzerland)
- Incumbent
- Assumed office 30 November 2015

Personal details
- Born: Regine Martina Sauter; 16 April 1966 (age 60) Schaffhausen, Schaffhausen, Switzerland
- Party: The Liberals
- Education: University of St. Gallen (PhD); University of California, Berkeley (MBA)

Regine Martina Sauter (born 16 April 1966) is a Swiss businesswoman and politician. She currently serves as a member of the National Council (Switzerland) for The Liberals since 2015.

== Early life and education ==
Sauter was born 16 April 1966 in Schaffhausen, Switzerland to Werner and Elisabeth (née Burkhard) Sauter. She has one younger brother, Ulrich Sauter, who is an attorney and former banking executive. Her father was an executive for SIG in Neuhausen am Rheinfall, which was later merged with Canadian Onex Corporation. She is of partial German descent on her paternal grandmothers side. Her great-grandfather, Dr. Hans Hennicke (1878-1963), who hailed from Oberkassel (today part of Düsseldorf) was the general director of Portland-Cementwerk Thayngen AG (today a part of Holcim).

She was raised in Flurlingen in the countryside of the Zurich highlands. She attended the local public schools and studied Political science from 1986 to 1991 at the University of St. Gallen, where she received a Licentiate degree (equal to a Master's degree). In 1995 she received her PhD. In 2002, she completed an Executive MBA at the University of St. Gallen and the University of California, Berkeley.

== Professional career ==
Between 2004 and 2012, Sauter has been the Executive Secretary of the Social Department of the City of Winterthur. From 2006 to 2015 she has been the president of the foundation ProMobil which offers transportation for handicapped people. Until 2012, she also served in the capacity of executive director of Forel Klinik, a specialized clinic for drug rehabilitation. Between 2008 and 2012 Sauter has been president of the Swiss Diabetes Society and from 2008 to 2011 executive director for Frauenzentrale Zürich a non-governmental organization for women's rights.

More recently, Sauter as served as an executive director for the Europe Institut at the University of Zurich since 2012, member of the board of Federas Beratung AG (consulting) since 2016, member of the board of Zürich Opera House between 2017 and 2022. Additionally she also serves as a director for the Zurich Chamber of Commerce since 2012.

== Politics ==
Sauter was elected into the National Council (Switzerland) in the 2015 Swiss federal election, which was held on 18 October 2015. She assumed office for The Liberals on 30 November 2015.

In 2022, she made public that she wants to campaign for a seat in the Council of States, to succeed incumbent Ruedi Noser.

== Personal life ==
Sauter resides in Zürich.
