= Sanitätspolizei Bern =

The Sanitätspolizei Bern (English: Berne Medical Police) is the emergency medical service for Bern, Switzerland, and 38 surrounding municipalities with a total of 320,000 inhabitants. Despite its name, which dates to the time when it was part of the municipal police, the Sanitätspolizei is not a police force.

== Administration ==
The Sanitätspolizei is part of the municipal administration of Bern, attached to the Department of Security, Environment and Energy. It is a fully professional organization with 150 employees. It originally operated from a central barracks on Waisenhausplatz in the Old City of Bern. Due to overcrowding, it relocated to a new headquarters in 2013.

In addition to its emergency service, the Sanitätspolizei operates the medical emergency telephone number service (phone no. 144) for the canton of Bern, provides command and control in major emergencies, provides the medical service during big events and provides medical training to police and other emergency forces.
