= Matthias Aebischer =

Swiss journalist and politician

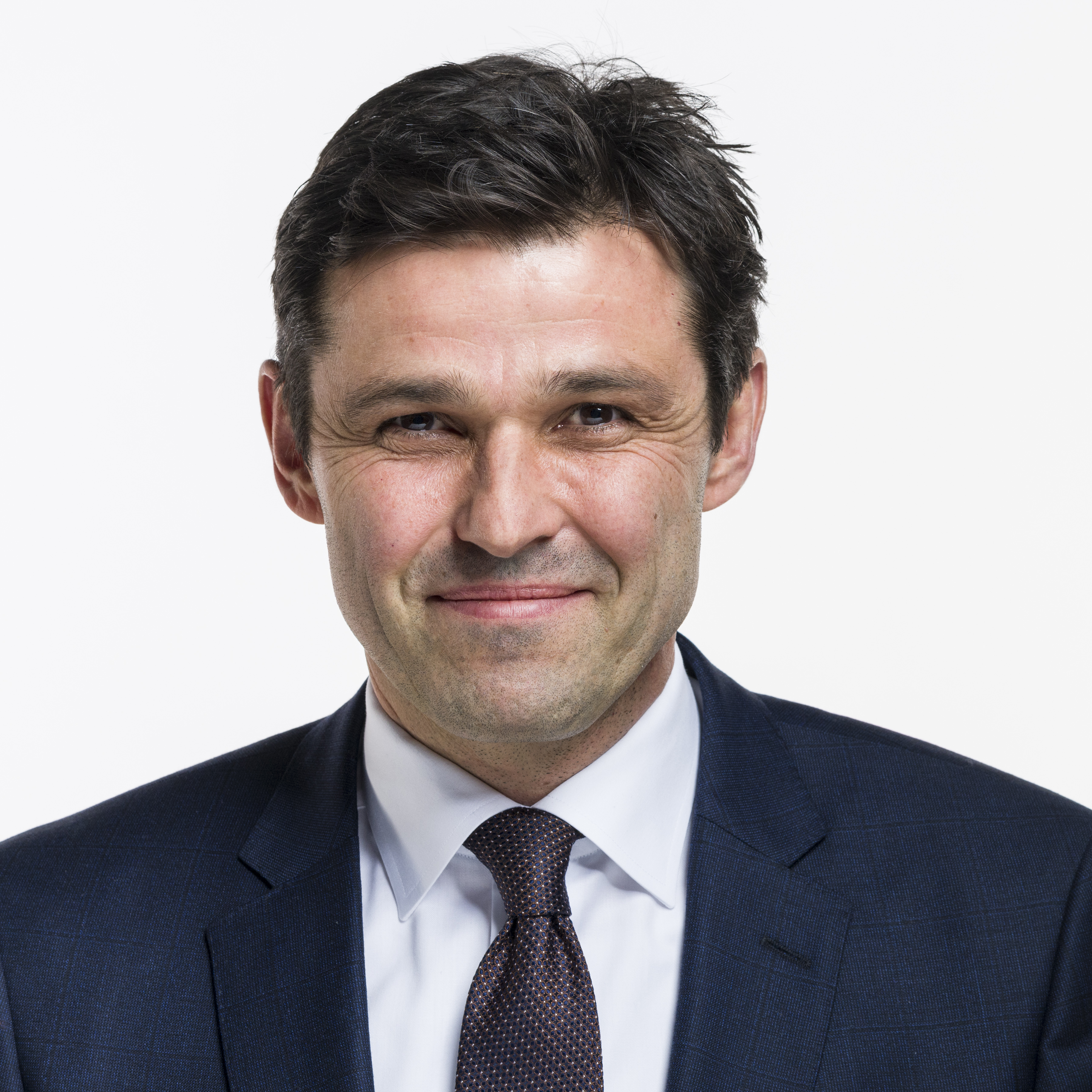
- Official portrait, 2019

Member-elect of Municipal Council of Bern
- Incumbent
- Assumed office 24 November 2024

Member of National Council
- Incumbent
- Assumed office 5 December 2011

Personal details
- Born: Matthias Aebischer; 18 October 1967 (age 58) Schwarzenburg, Switzerland
- Spouse: Patricia Gschwind (m. 2008; div. 2017)
- Domestic partner: Tiana Angelina Moser (since 2018)
- Children: 4
- Occupation: Journalist, presenter, politician, teacher

Matthias Aebischer (German: [məˈtiːəs ˈɛbɪʃər]; born 18 October 1967) is a Swiss journalist, television presenter and politician who currently serves as member of the National Council since 2011 for the Social Democratic Party. In November 2024, Aebischer was elected to serve on the Municipal Council of Bern, ultimately he announced to leave the National Council, being succeeded by Ueli Schmezer.

== Early life and education ==
Aebischer was born 18 October 1967 in Schwarzenburg, Switzerland, the second of four children, to Herbert Aebischer (1937–2024), a secondary school teacher, and Margarete Aebischer (née Indermühle). He has an older sister and two younger brothers. He was raised in Schwarzenburg and attended the local schools. Ultimately he went to teachers college in Bern.

== Professional career ==
Between 1988–90, Aebischer was a public school teacher in Ligerz, before switching his career into journalism. Ultimately he was employed with a private radio station before he joined Swiss Radio and Television in 1992. Initially, he was in radio before moving to television in 1994.

In 2001, he returned to his teaching career and taught Media and Communication at the University of Fribourg, combining the job with his journalism work until 2015, when he quit lecturing. Between 2006–2009, Aebischer was a editor and television presenter for Tagesschau (current affairs program) and Kassensturz (consumer protection program) as well was the host of Club (talkshow).

During the 2011 Swiss federal election, where he was ultimately elected, he left his career as television presenter. He currently is engaged in variety of several professional bodies and foundations, including Pro Velo Schweiz (a cyclists' interest group), where he served as president; the Swiss Association for Further Education (SVEB); and Cinésuisse, the umbrella body for the Swiss film and audiovisual industry .

== Political career ==
Aebischer was first elected to the National Council on 23 October 2011 on the ticket of SP, to represent the canton of Bern. In 2017, he introduced a bill to ban import of animals that had undergone ritual slaughter into the country. The bill faced opposition mostly from French-speaking Swiss consumers of such meat. He was re-elected to the Council in 2019 and serves on multiple Commissions, including Transport and Telecommunications, Science (chairman 2014–2015), Education and Culture and currently serves as president of Judiciary Commission (2022–2023).

== Personal life ==
From a first marriage, he has two daughters;

- Laura Aebischer (born 1999)
- Gianna Aebischer (born 2002)

In 2008, Aebischer secondly married Patricia Gschwind (born 1969), whom he ultimately divorced in 2017. They have one daughter;

- Ida Aebischer (born 2009)

Since 2018, Aebischer is in a relationship with Tiana Angelina Moser, who also serves on the National Council (Switzerland) for the Green Liberal Party. They have one daughter together;

- Lotta Sophia Aebischer (born 2019)

Aebischer resides in Bern.
