= Neo – The Social-liberal Centre =

Neo – The social-liberal Centre Neo – Die sozialliberale Mitte
- Former logo as CSPO
- President: Konstantin Bumann
- Founded: November 14, 1949
- Ideology: Christian democracy
- Political position: Centre
- National affiliation: The Centre
- Colors: Yellow

Website
- www.neowallis.ch

Neo – The Social-liberal Centre (German: Neo – Die sozialliberale Mitte; French: NEO – Le Centre social-libéral), known before 2023 as the Christian-social People's Party of Upper Valais (German: Christlichsoziale Volkspartei Oberwallis CSPO) is a Christian-social political party in the German-speaking areas of the Swiss canton of Valais (Upper Valais).

== History ==
The party was founded on 14 November 1949, mainly by Wolfgang Loretan, to counter the rise of labour-oriented christian-social movements.

In March 2023, following the merger of the CVP and BDP, the party renamed itself Neo, being the last of the three cantonal parties associated with The Centre to remove the word "Christian".

Until 20 February 2026, it was associated federally with The Centre but since this date, it's fully independent as the party broke away from the national Center.

== Political orientation ==
Neo is one of three cantonal branches of The Centre in Valais, the other two being The Centre of Lower Valais and The Centre of Upper Valais. Neo caucuses with The Centre nationally, but it is independent at the cantonal level, its members of the Grand Council sitting as their own group.

== Electoral results ==
=== Federal elections ===
The party had one member of the National Council from 1951 until 2003, then had one elected again in 2007 and 2015. It rarely ran for the Council of States, often supporting the PDC/CVP candidates instead. It has not had a member of the Council of States since 2015 and of the National Council since 2019.

=== Cantonal elections ===
In the 2021 cantonal elections, the party lost two seats but still has eight members in the Grand Council, and is the second-largest parliamentary group from Upper Valais.

Election	Seats (Note: Only the seats in Upper Valais)
1953	14 / 40
1957	15 / 40
1961	17 / 40
1965	17 / 41
1969	19 / 41
1973	18 / 41
1977	16 / 41
1981	15 / 41
1985	16 / 41
1989	15 / 41
1993	14 / 40
1997	14 / 40
2001	13 / 40
2005	15 / 39
2009	14 / 39
2013	12 / 38
2017	10 / 34
2021	8 / 33
