= Christian Imark =

Swiss businessman and politician

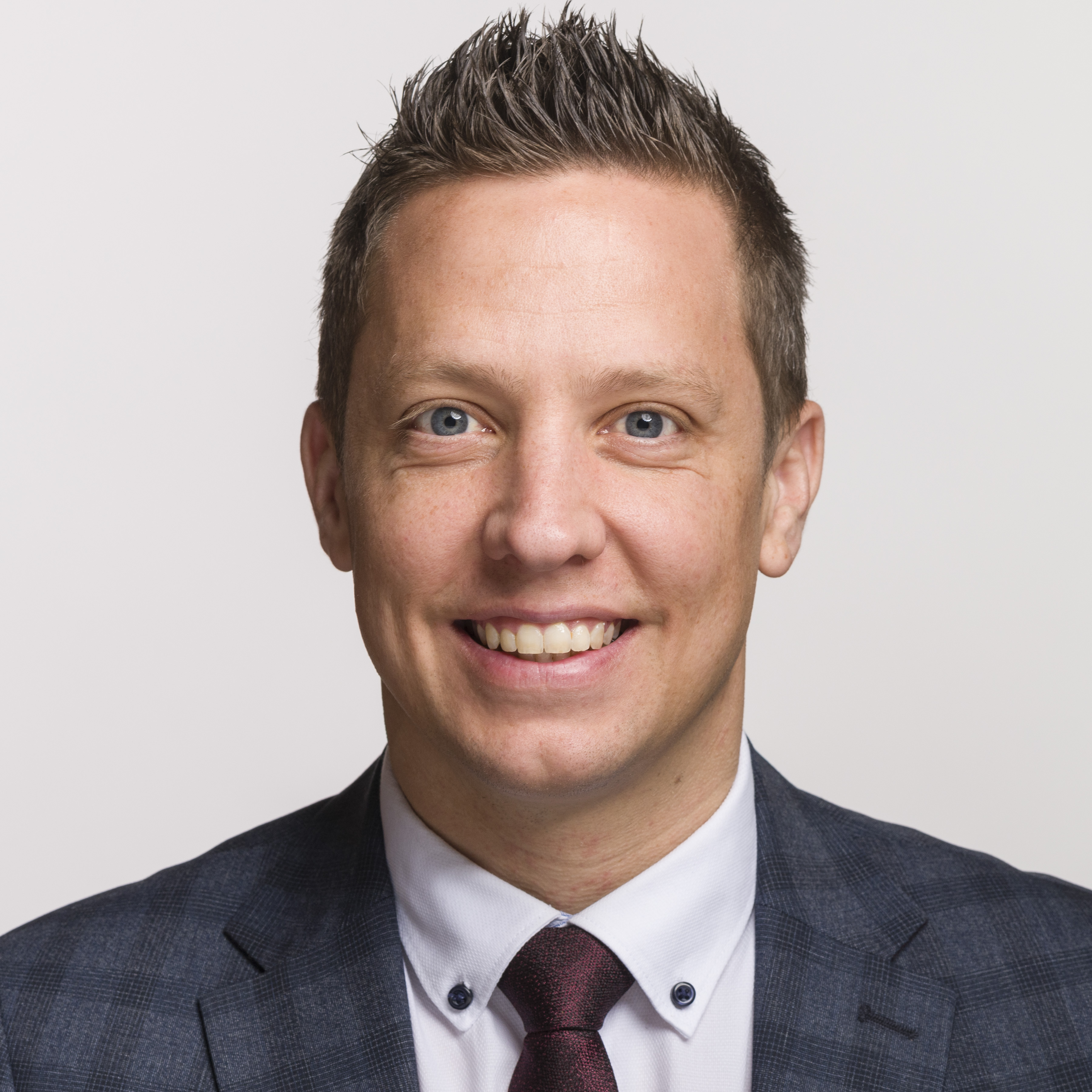
- Official portrait, 2019

Member of the National Council (Switzerland)
- Incumbent
- Assumed office 30 November 2015
- Constituency: Canton of Solothurn

Member of the Cantonal Council of Solothurn
- In office 2001–2015

Personal details
- Born: Christian Josia Maria Dieter Imark; 29 January 1982 (age 44) Breitenbach, Switzerland
- Party: Swiss People's Party
- Spouse: Carmen Schmidhalter
- Children: 2
- Education: Bern University of Applied Sciences
- Occupation: Businessman, politician
- Website: Official website (in German)

Christian Josia Maria Dieter Imark commonly known as Christian Imark (born 29 January 1982) is a Swiss businessman and politician. He currently serves on the National Council (Switzerland) for the Swiss People's Party since 2015. In 2001, Imark was elected as the youngest member into the Cantonal Council of Solothurn at age 19. He started serving in 2015 when he was elected into National Council. He also served as the youngest president of the Cantonal Council in its history in 2012.

== Early life and education ==
Imark was born 29 January 1982, in Breitenbach, Switzerland. He completed an apprenticeship at Von Roll Holding and then studied Architecture with a major in management at Bern University of Applied Sciences in Burgdorf. In 2010, he completed a Certificate of Advanced Studies (CAS) at Zurich University of Applied Sciences in Communications.

== Career ==
In 2008, Imark returned to his former job under Von Roll Holding and took a position in quality management of the wire production department. He held the position of Global Customer Manager in this company until 2016. Imark is also the owner and managing director of his own company called Airboxx GmbH (Airboxx, LLC) in 2013, which is a group primarily active in event management. Since 2015, he is also the president of the Solothurn chapter of the Swiss Road Transportation Association (ASTAG).
