= Gregor Rutz =

Swiss politician (born 1972)

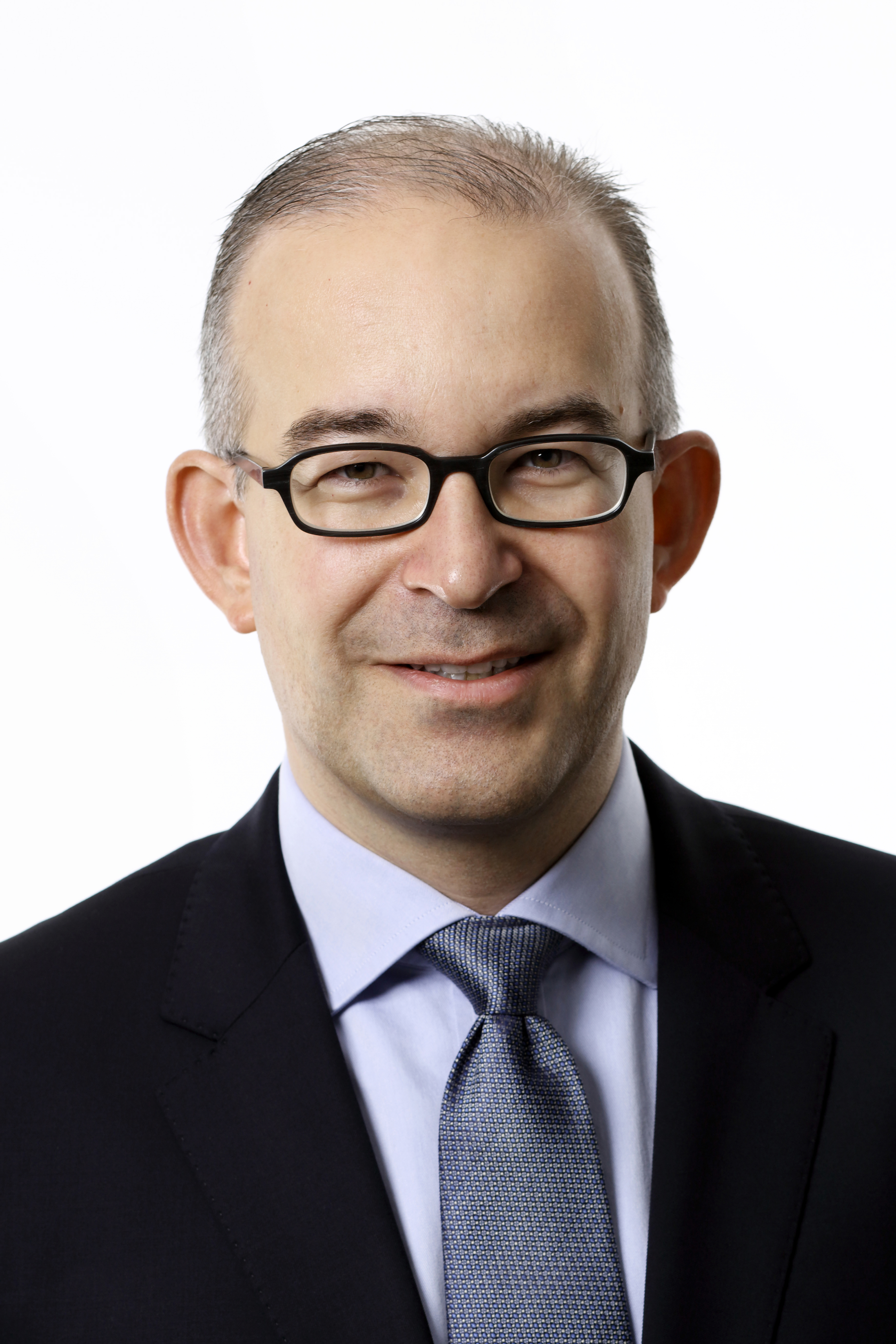
- Gregor Rutz (2012)

Member of the National Council
- Incumbent
- Assumed office 26 November 2012
- Preceded by: Bruno Zuppiger

Personal details
- Born: Gregor Anton Rutz; 12 October 1972 (age 53) Zürich, Zürich, Switzerland
- Party: Swiss People's Party
- Profession: Businessman, lawyer and politician
- Website: gregor-rutz.ch (in German)

Military service
- Allegiance: Switzerland
- Branch/service: Swiss Armed Forces
- Rank: Fourier (Sargeant)

Gregor Anton Rutz (born 12 October 1972) is a Swiss businessman, lawyer and politician. He currently serves as a member on the National Council (Switzerland) for the Swiss People's Party since 26 November 2012. He served on the Cantonal Council of Zürich from 2011 to 2012.

== Early life and education ==
Rutz was born 12 October 1972 in Zürich, Switzerland. He completed his Matura and studied Law at the University of Zürich, graduating with a Licentiate degree (equivalent to a Master's degree).

== Career ==
Between 1996 and 2002 he was an adjunct professor at the University of Zurich, where he lectured on commercial law, constitutional law and economics and also held a position as scientific assistant at the University of Fribourg in Fribourg, Switzerland. Between 2001 and 2008 he was the secretary and managing director of the Swiss People's Party. In 2008, he formed Rutz & Partner, a communications and public relations firm in Zollikon near Zürich. Since 2017, he has been the founding partner of Le Chardon Bleu Sàrl, a wine trading firm which imports and sells wine, primarily from Bordeaux.

== Politics ==
From 2000 until 2005, Rutz was a member of the Constitutional Council of Zürich and between 2001 and 2008, he served in the capacity of general secretary of the Swiss People's Party. He was among the three seat executive management of the party together with Ueli Maurer and Caspar Baader. Between 2011 and 2012 he briefly served on the Cantonal Council of Zürich, before ultimately being elected into National Council (Switzerland) during the 2011 Swiss federal election. He assumed office on 26 November 2012 with his predecessor Bruno Zuppiger resigning on 10 September 2012.

In 2022, he made public to run for Council of States (Switzerland), in order to succeed Ruedi Noser.

== Private ==
Rutz is married and resides in Zürich, Switzerland.
