= Tiana Angelina Moser =

Swiss politician (born 1979)

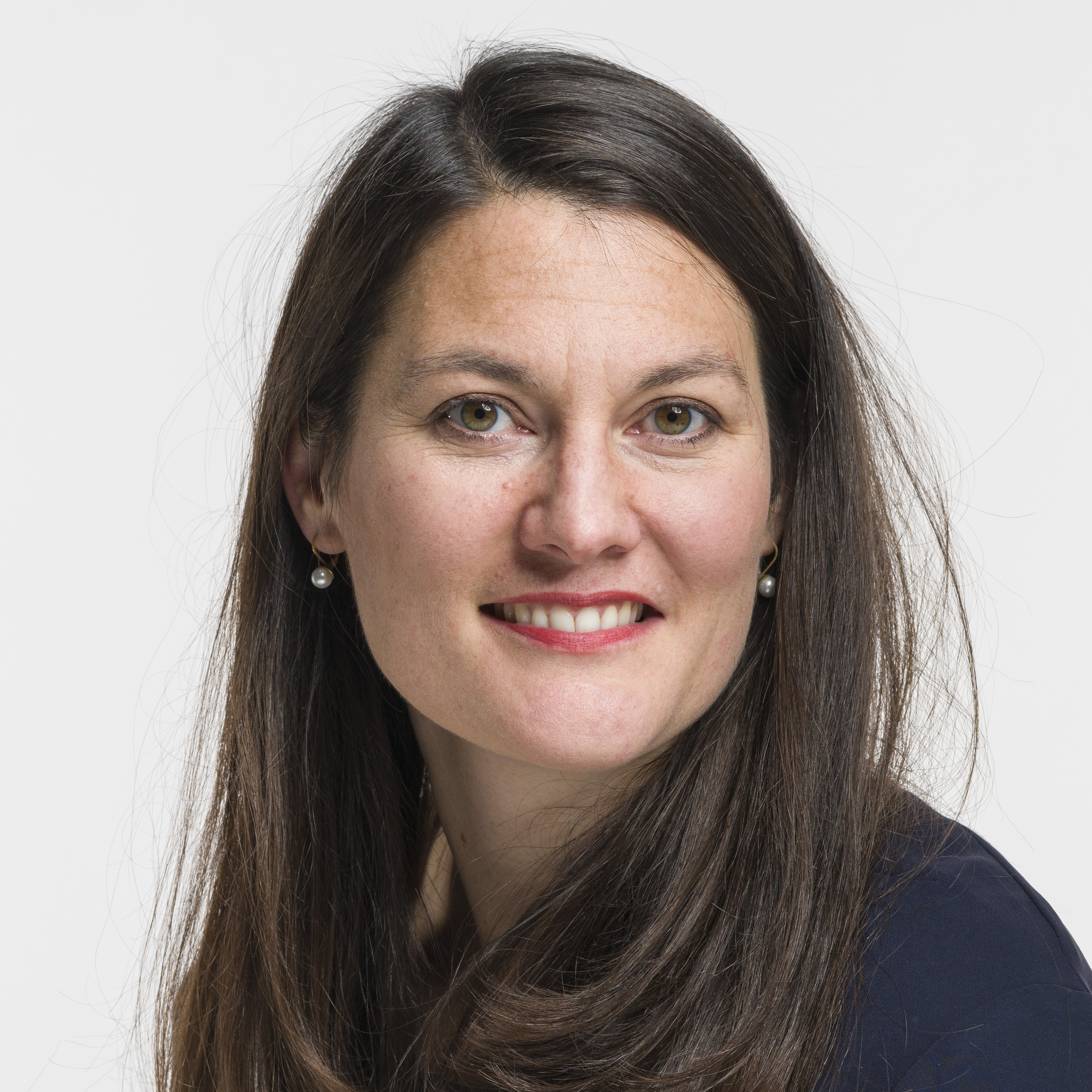
- Tiana Angelina Moser in 2019

Member of the National Council
- Incumbent
- Assumed office 2007
- Parliamentary group: GLP

Personal details
- Born: 6 April 1979 (age 47) Zürich, Switzerland
- Domestic partner: Matthias Aebischer
- Education: University of Zurich

Tiana Angelina Moser (born 6 April 1979) is an educator and politician of the Green Liberal Party (GLP). Since 2007 she is a member of the National Council and since 2011 she is the leader of the parties parliamentarian group.

== Early life and education ==
Tiana Angelina Moser was born in Zürich, Switzerland and grew up in Weisslingen in the canton of Zürich. She then graduated from the gymnasium in Winterthur in 2000. Following she studied international law and political and environmental sciences and the University of Zurich between 2000 and 2002. Between 2002 and 2003, she studied political sciences at the Pompeu Fabra University in Barcelona. After her return to University of Zurich, she was involved in several projects regarding environmental politics and economics during her studies, and after graduation, kept working at the university.

== Political career ==
She joined the Green Liberal Party (GLP) in 2004 and in Federal Elections of 2007 she was elected into the National Council. In 2011 she was elected as the leader of the parliamentarian group. She was in the Commission for Foreign Politics between 2007 and 2021 and was its president between 2019 and 2021. She was a candidate for the Council of State as a representative of the GLP for the canton of Zürich in 2019, but not elected. In October 2022 she was announced again as a candidate for the Council of State for the Federal Elections in 2023.

=== Political positions ===
She is known for her support of a healthy work-life balance and the protection of the environment. Regarding the Swiss neutrality, she supported a permission for the export of protective clothes for the civilian population. In national politics she is aware of the difficulties a party not taking part in a political alliance for the elections to the cantonal executives and suggested that after an evaluation it should be possible to take part in either an alliance in right or left-wing politics.

Regarding the bilateral relations between Switzerland and the European Union, she was a firm supporter of the ongoing negotiations towards an Institutional Agreement. After the Federal Council then announced the end of the negotiations in May 2021, she led a delegation of Swiss MPs to Brussels to evaluate the situation. In view of a re-admission of Switzerland to the EU programs Horizon Europe and Erasmus+ she would support the doubling of the sum which Switzerland pays as a contribution to the European Union.

== Personal life ==
Since 2018, she is in a relationship with the National Councillor of the Social Democratic Party (SP) Matthias Aebischer. She is the mother of 3 children.
