= Benjamin Mühlemann =

Swiss politician (born 1979)

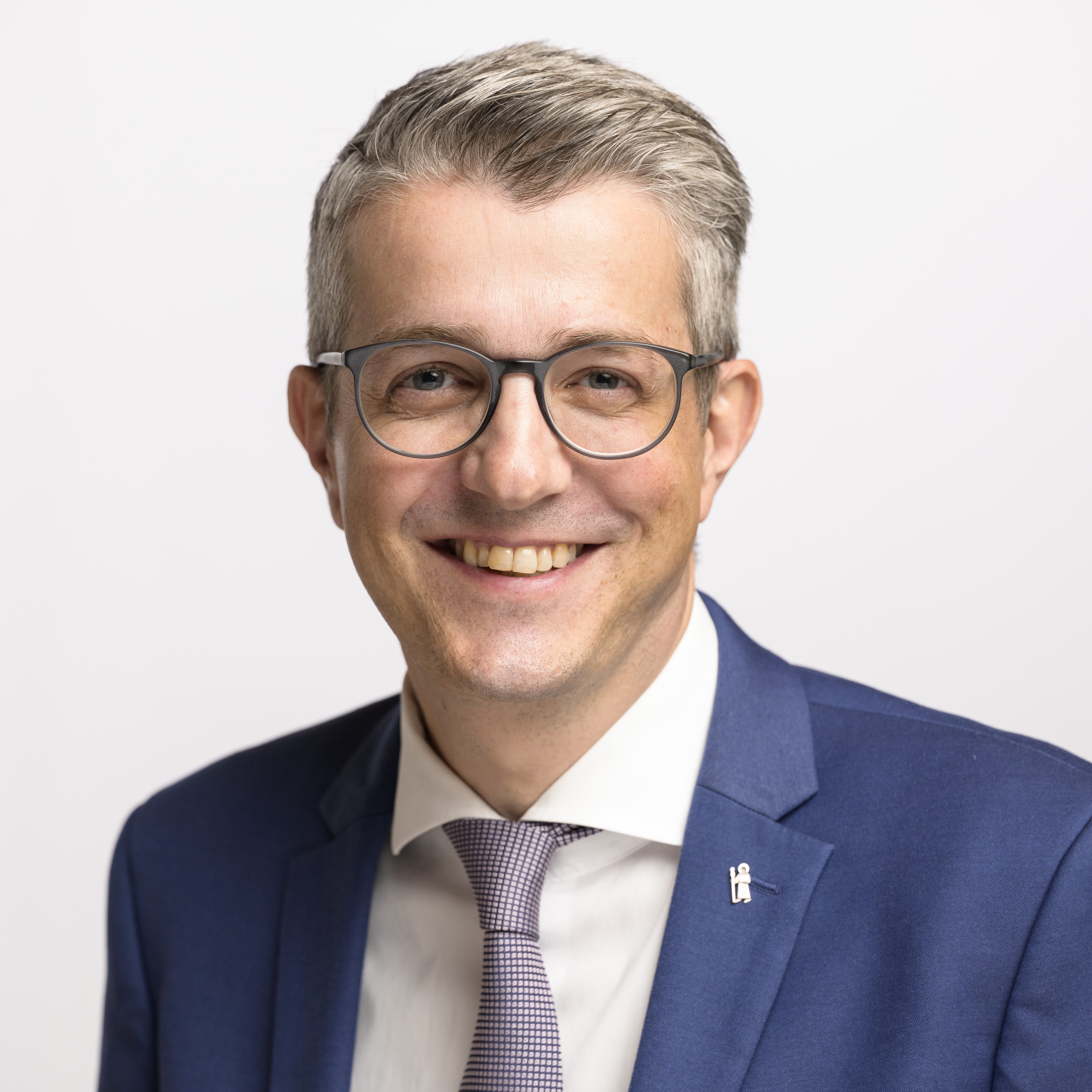
- Mühlemann in 2023

Member of the Council of States
- Incumbent
- Assumed office 22 October 2023
- Preceded by: Thomas Hefti
- Constituency: Glarus

Member of the Executive Council of Glarus
- In office 2014 – May 2024

Member of the Landrat of Glarus
- In office 2010–2014

Personal details
- Born: 1 February 1979 (age 47) Mollis, Glarus, Switzerland
- Party: FDP.The Liberals
- Occupation: Politician, communications professional

Benjamin Mühlemann (born 1 February 1979) is a Swiss politician. He is a member of the FDP.

== Career ==
After attending primary school in Mollis and the cantonal school in Glarus, he completed the Matura in 1998 and studied journalism and communication at the Zurich University of Applied Sciences in Winterthur. He worked as an editor of the daily newspaper Südostschweiz in Glarus, as a communications project manager at Axpo Holding AG in Zurich, and as head of communications and member of the management team at the Swiss-Liechtenstein Building Technology Association suissetec in Zurich. Mühlemann is member of the board of directors of Glarner Kantonalbank and the Kantonsspital Glarus AG.

He lives with his family in Mollis.

== Political activity ==
In 2010, Mühlemann was elected to the Landrat of Glarus (cantonal parliament), where he was a member until 2014.

He has been a member of the cantonal government council since 2014. He initially headed the Department of Education and Culture for seven years. In 2021, he moved to the Department of Finance and Health. Since the Landsgemeinde 2022, he has also been the incumbent Landammann (District President). The term ends in May 2024.

In the Council of States elections 2023, Mühlemann was elected to the Council of States. He succeeded his party colleague Thomas Hefti, who took office at the end of legislature.
