= Nik Gugger =

Swiss politician (born 1970)

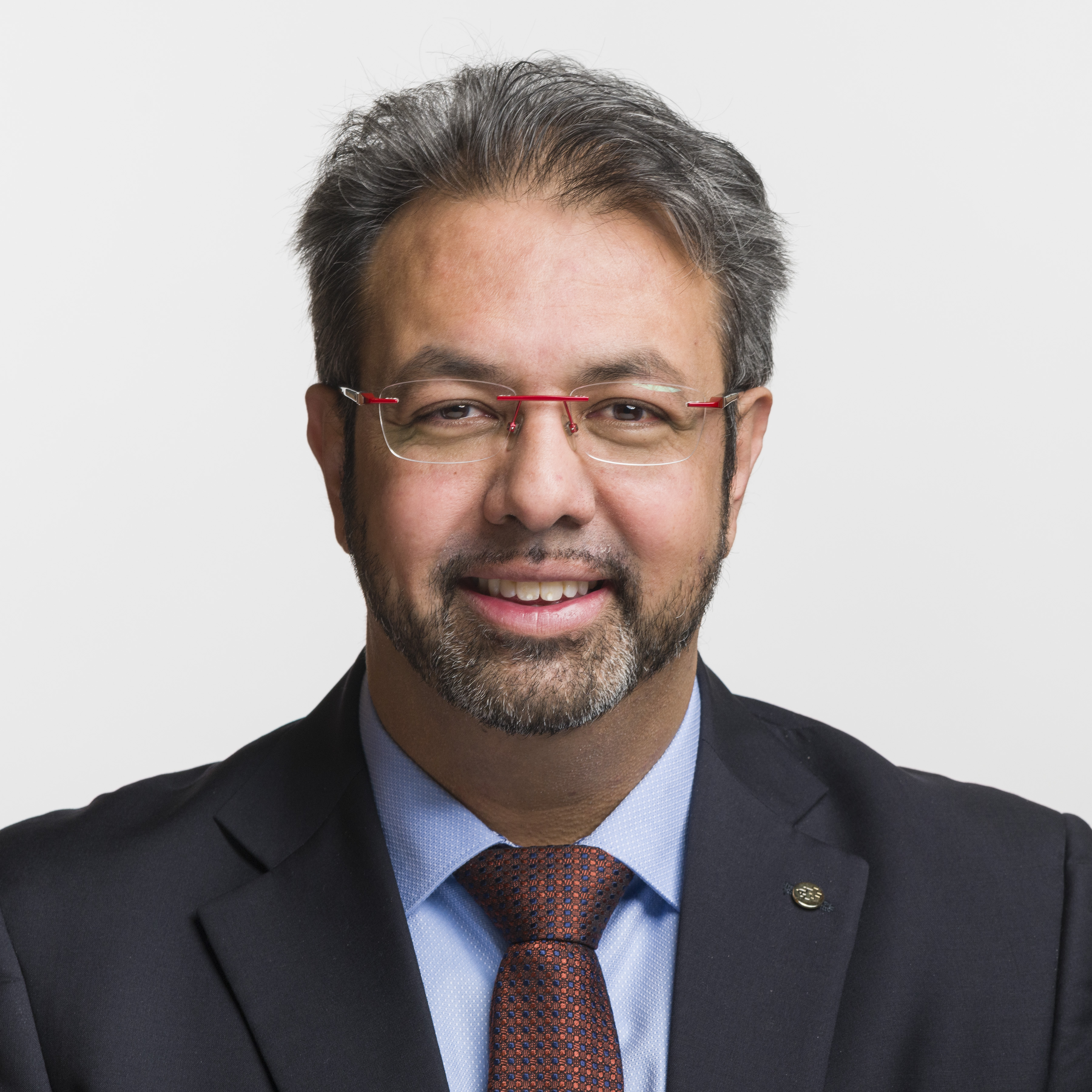
- Nik Gugger (2019)

Member of the National Council (Switzerland)
- Incumbent
- Assumed office 27 November 2017
- Constituency: Zürich

Personal details
- Born: Niklaus-Samuel Gugger; May 1, 1970 (age 55) Udupi, Karnataka, India
- Party: Evangelical People's Party
- Spouse: Beatrice Josi (m. 1994)
- Children: 3
- Website: Official website

Niklaus-Samuel Gugger best known as Nik Gugger (/ˈɡʊɡər/; GOOG-er born 1 May 1970) is a Swiss politician. He currently serves as a member of the National Council (Switzerland) for the Evangelical People's Party since 2017. He previously served as a member of the Cantonal Council of Zürich from 2014 to 2017. From 2002 to 2014, Gugger was a member of the City Council of Winterthur. Since 2019 he holds an honorary doctorate from Kalinga Institute of Industrial Technology in Odisha, India. He is the first member of parliament of Indian descent to serve in the Swiss Parliament.

== Early life and education ==
Gugger was born 1 May 1970 at the CSI Basel Mission Hospital in Udupi, Karnataka, India, to a Brahmin widow called Anasuya. Due to difficulties, his mother was unable to keep him, and gave him to Dr. Marianne Pflugfelder of the missionary hospital to seek a couple that adopts him. Swiss couple Fritz and Elisabeth (née Wegmüller) Gugger adopted him and changed his name to Niklaus-Samuel Gugger. His adoptive parents were Evangelical missionaries and raised him in Thalassery, India for four years before they moved to Uetendorf, Switzerland.

== Career ==
Gugger completed an apprenticeship as mechanic in Steffisburg. He later completed a trainee program in social work in Colombia became a youth and social worker upon completion of the training. Gugger was awarded an honorary doctorate by the Kalinga Institute of Industrial Technology in Odisha, India for his social work for children and young people. In the wake of the COVID-19 pandemic, Nik Gugger launched a fundraising campaign to enable ventilator purchases in Odisha, India.

== Political career ==
Gugger is a member of Evangelical People's Party of Switzerland (EPP) and sits on the central board of the party. He was elected to the City Council of Winterthur in 2002 and became president of EPP group in the council in 2008. In the 2010 Winterthur election, he received absolute majority, placed eight position but fell short of being admitted to the seven-member committee. He was elected to the Zurich Cantonal Council from 2014 to 2017. He ran for government council in Zurich in 2015 but lost. In 2017, he was elected to the National Council and was re-elected in 2019. He serves on the Foreign Policy Committee, and he is a member of the Council of Europe and vice-president of the EPP Switzerland.

== Personal life ==
Gugger married in 1994 and has three children.
