= Ruedi Noser =

Swiss businessman and politician

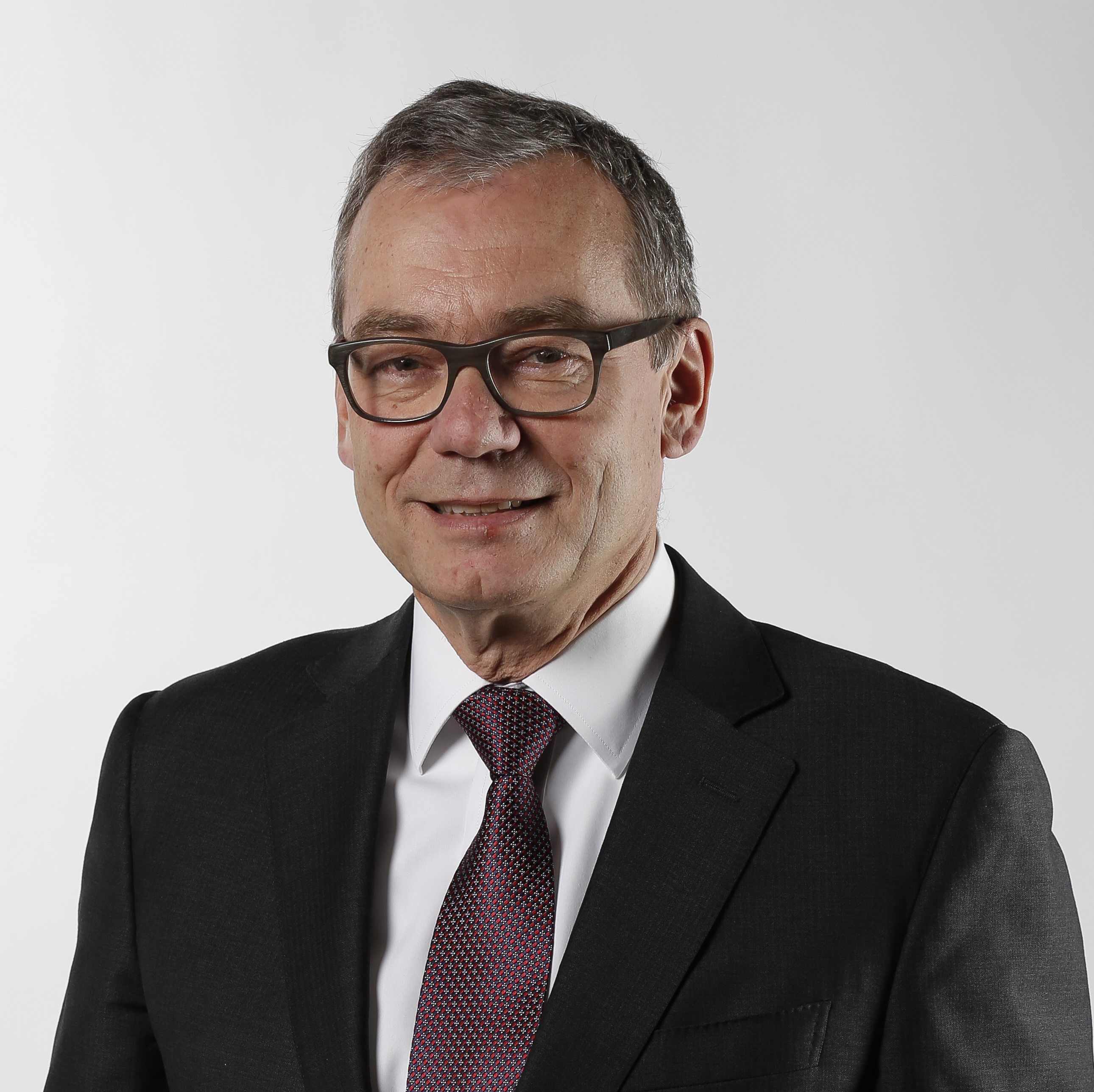
- Official portrait, 2015

Member of the Council of States
- In office 8 December 2015 – 3 December 2023

Member of the National Council of Switzerland
- In office 1 December 2003 – 7 December 2015

Personal details
- Born: Rudolf Noser; 14 April 1961 (age 65) Glarus, Switzerland
- Children: 5
- Education: University of Applied Sciences Rapperswil (B.E., 1985); University of St. Gallen; University of Zurich
- Occupation: Swiss businessman and politician (FDP.The Liberals)

Rudolf "Ruedi" Noser (German pronunciation: [ˈrøːdi ˈnoːzɐ]; born 14 April 1961) is a Swiss businessman and politician who served on the Council of States (Switzerland) for The Liberals from 2015 to 2023. He previously served on the National Council (Switzerland) from 2003 to 2015.

Noser is a serial entrepreneur and business advocate who was among the wealthiest members of the Swiss parliament estimated by Handelszeitung with an estimated net worth of CHF 50 million (equivalent to $55 million in 2024) estimated by Bilanz magazine.

== Early life and education ==
Noser was born 14 April 1961 in Glarus, Switzerland, the fourth of five children, to Meinrad Noser (1921-1997), an auto mechanic. He was raised in a modest, blue-collar family. From 1978 to 1982, Noser completed an apprenticeship as a mechanic at Rieter in Winterthur. He then studied at the University of Applied Sciences Rapperswil and graduated in 1985 as an electrical engineer. Later he continued his education at the University of St. Gallen (HSG) in Business Management and at the University of Zurich in Business Administration.

== Professional career ==
Together with his brother, he set up a software company. In 1988, Ruedi Noser co-owned Noser AG (development of measurement and control technology) in Winterthur, which was restructured a year later to the Noser Group. Since 1996, he is the sole owner of the group. The Noser Group (Noser Management AG) includes several companies in Switzerland, Germany and Canada with a total of around 600 employees. The group competence lies in the area of telecommunications and computer science. Noser serves on the Board of Directors of Noser Management AG. From December 2006 to May 2008 he was chairman of the board of directors of Esmertec AG (now known as Myriad Group).

From 2000 to 2006, Noser was the Central President of Swiss Engineering. Since 2006 he was a member of the board and between 2009 and 2017 president of ICTswitzerland. He was also a member of the Industrial Advisory Board of the Department of Computer Science of ETH Zurich, a member of the board of Economiesuisse and a member of the Zurich Chamber of Commerce until May 2024.

Noser has been a member of the Board of Directors of AMC International Alfa Metalcraft since July 2012, and vice president since September 2016. He has been on the Board of Directors of natürli zürioberland ag since July 2012 and President since October 2018.

On 29 October 2018, Noser was elected to the Board of Directors of Crealogix Holding AG.

Noser has also been on the Board of Directors of Credit Suisse Asset Management AG since 2017 and the President of the Board of Directors of Bucher + Suter Inc. (Noser Group) in Boston.

== Politics ==
From 1997 to 2004, Noser was board member of the FDP Canton Zurich, from 2000 to 2003 he was also vice president and from 2003 to 2004 president ad interim of the Cantonal party. He waived a candidacy for the presidium of the FDP Canton of Zurich. From 1999 to 2009 he was also a member of the executive board of the FDP Switzerland (now FDP.The Liberals) and from 2003 to 2009 vice-president of the national party.

In the 1999–2003 parliamentary term, Ruedi Noser sat on the canton council for the Zurich FDP and between 2003 and 2015 as a representative of the FDP Canton of Zurich in the National Council. On 22 November 2015, he was elected to the Council of States as a representative of the Canton of Zurich. He was reelected in on November 17, 2019. He did not stand again in the elections to the Council of States in October 2023.

He became a co-founder and core member of the parliamentary group "ePower" in 2005.

== Personal life ==
Noser is separated and has five children. He is in a relationship. In 2023, he moved from the canton of Zurich to Freienbach in the canton of Schwyz.
