= The Liberals (Switzerland) =

Liberal political party in Switzerland

FDP.The Liberals: FDP.Die Liberalen (German); PLR.Les Libéraux-Radicaux (French); PLR.I Liberali Radicali (Italian); PLD.Ils Liberals (Romansh)
- Logo of the party in German, French, Italian, and Romansh
- President: Susanne Vincenz-Stauffacher co-president, Benjamin Mühlemann co-president
- Federal Councillors: Ignazio Cassis; Karin Keller-Sutter
- Founded: 1 January 2009; 17 years ago
- Merger of: Free Democratic Party, Liberal Party
- Headquarters: Neuengasse 20; Postfach 6136; CH-3001 Bern
- Youth wing: Young Liberals
- Membership (2015): 120,000
- Ideology: Liberalism (Swiss); Conservative liberalism; Classical liberalism
- Political position: Centre to centre-right
- European affiliation: Alliance of Liberals and Democrats for Europe Party
- International affiliation: Liberal International
- Colours: Azure
- Federal Council: 2 / 7
- National Council: 28 / 200
- Council of States: 11 / 46
- Cantonal executives: 38 / 154
- Cantonal legislatures: 512 / 2,544

Website
- www.fdp.ch (German); www.plr.ch (French); www.plrt.ch (Italian)

FDP.The Liberals (German: FDP.Die Liberalen, French: PLR.Les Libéraux-Radicaux, lit. 'LRP.The Liberal-Radicals', Italian: PLR.I Liberali Radicali, Romansh: PLD.Ils Liberals) is a liberal political party in Switzerland.

The party was formed on 1 January 2009, after two parties, the Free Democratic Party (FDP/PRD) and the smaller Liberal Party (LPS/PLS), united. In Vaud and Valais, the parties retain separate organisations. Its youth organisation is Young Liberals. With 120,000 members as of 2015, the FDP has the most members of any party: 20% more than the second-placed Christian Democratic People's Party of Switzerland (CVP/PDC). The Liberals (through its FDP predecessor) are the only party that has participated in every federal government since 1848 and since 2003 have been represented in the Federal Council by two members. They are the fourth-largest party in the National Council and is the second-largest in the Council of States.

The party is a member of the Alliance of Liberals and Democrats for Europe Party (ALDE Party) and an observer member of the Liberal International. The party's co-Presidents are Susanne Vincenz-Stauffacher and Benjamin Mühlemann. The current FDP representatives in the Federal Council are Ignazio Cassis and Karin Keller-Sutter.

== History ==
The party was formed in 2009 from the merger of the Free Democratic Party (FDP) and the Liberal Party. The radical Free Democratic Party, also called the 'Radicals', was Switzerland's major establishment party. Founded in 1894, the party's classical liberal predecessors had governed Switzerland outright for most of the 19th century, and had been the guiding force behind the creation of modern Switzerland. The Liberal Party, known as the 'Old Liberals', represented the French-speaking establishment: again rooted in the conservative liberalism of the nineteenth century. It also had a distinctly liberal Protestant outlook.

In the 2003 federal election, the two parties formed an electoral alliance. In the election, the Liberals were reduced to four seats, below the five required to form an official grouping in the Federal Assembly, so the two formed a joint caucus. In June 2005, the two founded the Radical and Liberal Union, which aimed to promote liberal goals through deeper cooperation. In 2007, the women's arms of the parties merged, while the youth wings merged the following year to form the Young Liberals. Agreement on the merger of the federal parties was agreed in October 2008. The agreement was adopted on 28 February 2009, applying retroactively to 1 January 2009. FDP President Fulvio Pelli of Ticino became the party's first leader, while Liberal President Pierre Weiss was named one of four Vice-Presidents.

Separate Free Democrat and Liberal branches remained in competition with each other in Geneva, Valais, and Vaud. In May 2011, the party's two Geneva branches – Liberal Party of Geneva and Radical Party of Geneva – merged to form a single FDP.The Liberals cantonal branch. In the 2015 federal election, the FDP increased its share of the popular vote by 1.3%, the first time it had increased since the 1979 federal election.

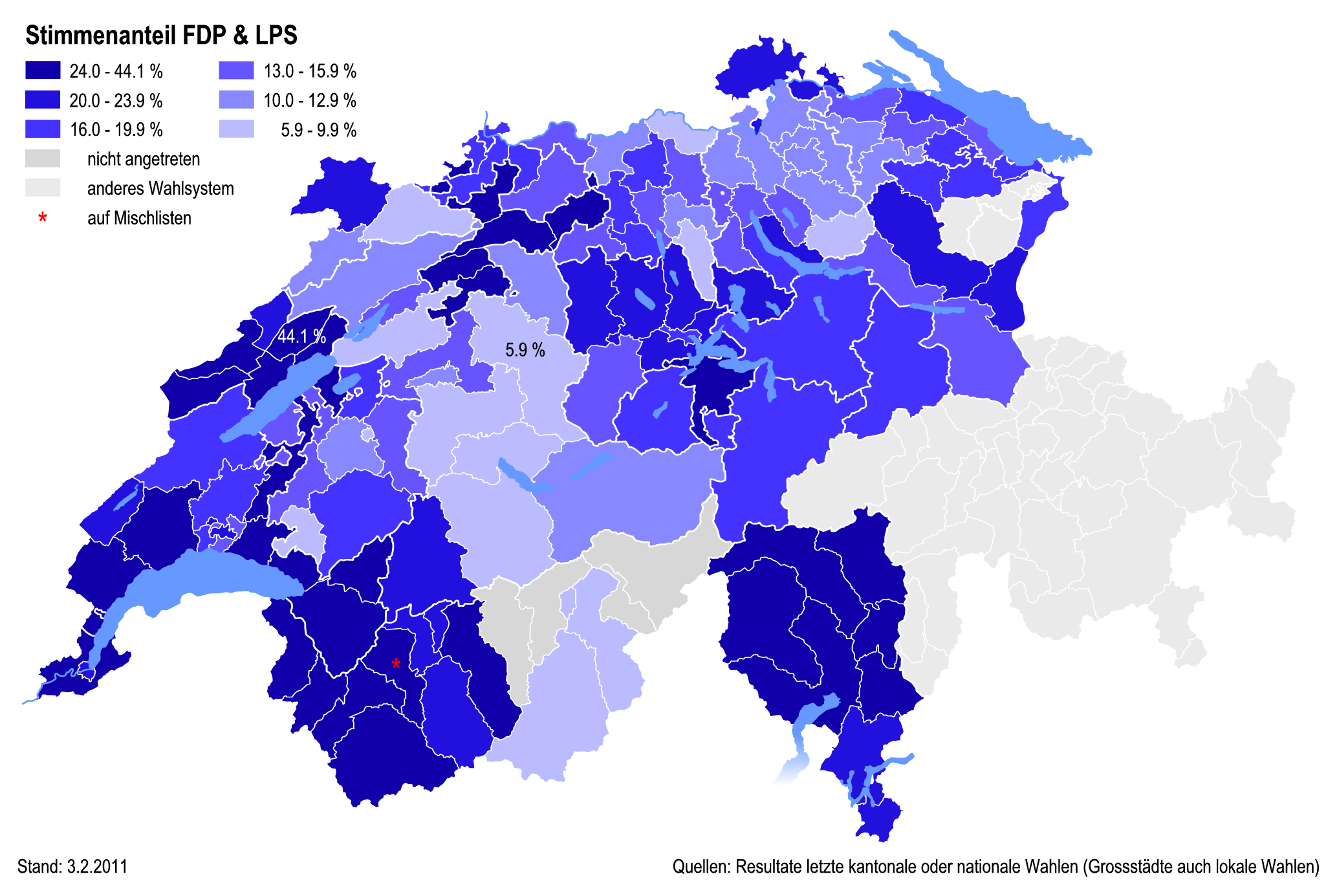
Percentages of the FDP at district level in 2011

== Policy positions ==
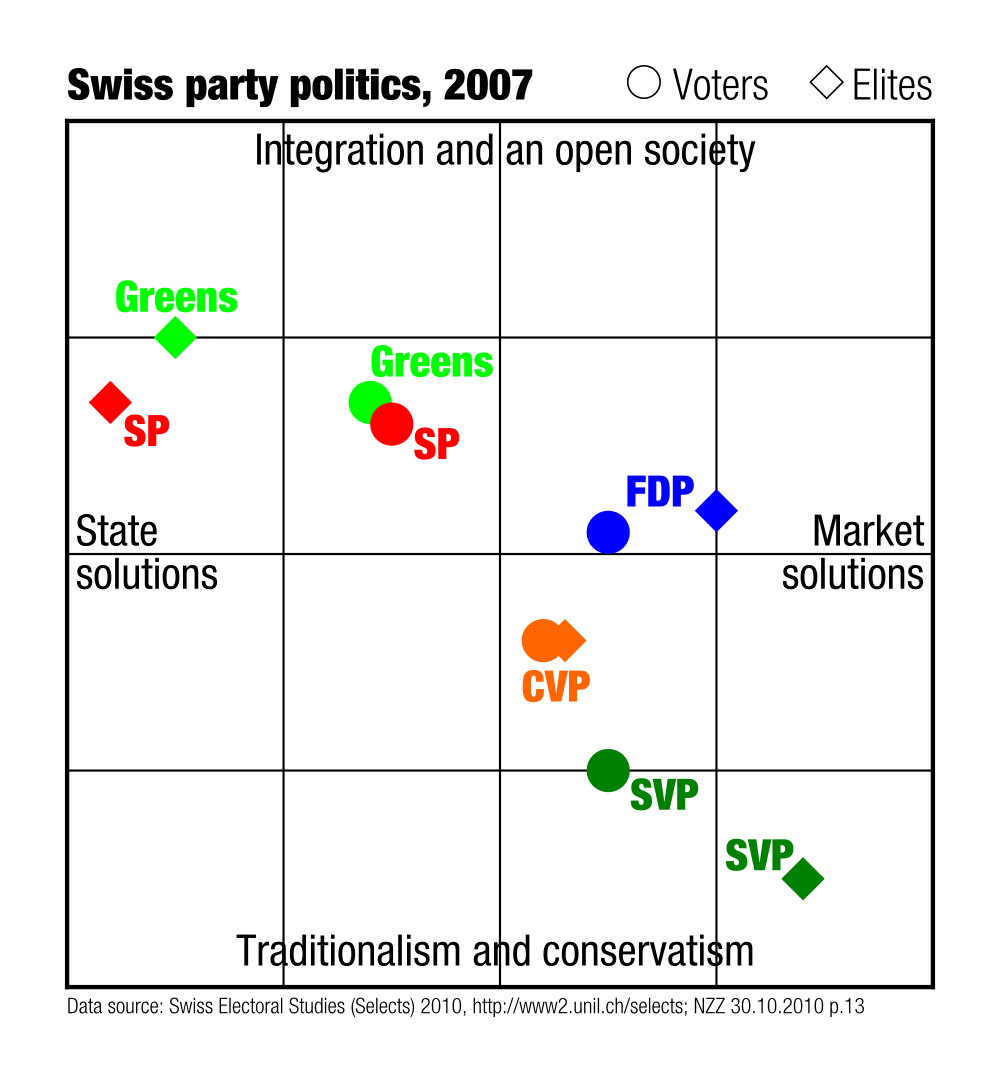
The FDP's positions in the Swiss political spectrum (2007)

FDP.The Liberals are strongest in French-speaking western Switzerland. They are the largest party in seven cantonal legislatures (coloured blue above), including highly-populous Geneva, Ticino, and Vaud.

As a classically liberal party, the FDP wants to protect civil liberties and individual responsibility. The FDP calls for mutual tolerance of people with different opinions and self-identities, entrepreneurship, social responsibility, the rule of law, and participatory democracy.

The party supports neutrality, federalism, direct democracy, and the tax sovereignty of each canton. It believes that national security should be credibly guaranteed by a skilled and strong militia. The party is for a "cosmopolitan Switzerland", which benefits from the opportunities that globalization provides. The FDP supports close cooperation with the EU through bilateral treaties, but rejects accession to the EU. The immigration policy of the party is based on the integration of immigrants, requiring clear and effective rules by means of an "integration law". The FDP calls for consistent action against abuse of laws in Switzerland by immigrants, and in repeated cases calls for deporting foreign criminals in accordance with international law. The FDP supports a peaceful foreign policy, which increases the security of Switzerland and prevents an increasing number of refugees.

=== Economic policy ===
The party believes that an open society and economic freedom are more conducive to prosperity, and greater economic and social stability, rather than a redistributive and regulative state. The FDP promotes freedom of choice over restrictions in all areas of private life. According to the party's stance, self-responsibility and competition should dictate the actions of individuals, rather than bans. The FDP wants to ensure that personal initiative is rewarded and not restricted by paternalism. Start-ups, particularly by young people, are to be encouraged.

The party stands for a simple tax code, low taxes, and for tax competition among the cantons. It calls for a more citizen-friendly state without excessive bureaucracy and excessive regulation, and for a lean state with lower government spending, which offers only those services which citizens and the private sector cannot provide. The party, which calls for a competitive and sustainable market economy, wants to strengthen Switzerland as a financial and economic hub with as little government interference as possible. It also calls for the reduction of public debt and fiscal deficits. In general, it believes that tax incentives are better than subsidies in creating incentives. The party saw opportunity in the 2008 financial crisis and to carry out financial and tax reforms quickly to improve the situation of companies in Switzerland, and to create 40,000 new jobs by 2015. The main objectives of energy policy are security of energy supply and increasing energy efficiency. The party wants to support the research of alternative sources of energy for electricity production which generate no carbon dioxide.

=== Social policy ===
The FDP works toward a society offering genuine opportunities with flexible choices in education, work and family support. It is also aiming at more and better jobs, a sustainable social welfare system which will result in strong national cohesion that counteracts see the divergence of society. This includes stabilizing premium costs in the healthcare sector and combating the abuse of social welfare systems, but also intergenerational equity. The motto of the party in matters of social security is: "Solidarity where it is necessary" and "self-reliance where it is possible". As a profitable investment for the future of society, the FDP wants to promote the highest quality education at all levels, since it considers human capital the most important resource of Switzerland. It considers innovation as a crucial asset for prosperity and wants to improve the position of Switzerland as one of the leaders of innovation.

The party is, in principle, in favour of ending marijuana prohibition to encourage safe and legal free enterprise as opposed to a costly war on drugs; instead, it emphasizes personal and family responsibility over life choices, as opposed to making such choices a state power. However, many in the party may not be in favour of full legalization, such as in the U.S. state of Colorado, but just decriminalisation such as the approach in Portugal.

The FDP supported making same-sex marriage legal in Switzerland. They are also in favour of instituting civil unions as an alternative option to marriage for all couples (whether same-sex or opposite-sex).

=== Foreign policy ===
The FDP opposes Swiss membership in the European Union, saying that Switzerland can only remain a world leader if it remains outside the EU. It strongly supports the bilateral accords that Switzerland has with the EU, however. In the 2001 referendum, the FDP campaigned against opening negotiations to join the EU. The FDP believes that international law takes precedence over Swiss law, although it states that Swiss voters should approve international law before it takes effect.

== Election results ==
=== National Council ===
Election	Votes	%	Seats	+/–
2011	368,951	15.1 (#3)	30 / 200	New
2015	413,444	16.4 (#3)	33 / 200	▲3
2019	366,303	15.1 (#3)	29 / 200	▼4
2023	364,053	14.25 (#3)	28 / 200	▼1

== Party strength over time ==
Percentage of the total vote in each canton for FDP.The Liberals (post-2009)/FDP (pre-2009) in Federal Elections, 1971–2023
Canton	1971	1975	1979	1983	1987	1991	1995	1999	2003	2007	2011	2015	2019	2023
Switzerland	21.8	22.2	24.0	23.3	22.9	21.0	20.2	19.9	17.3	15.8	15.1	16.4	15.1	14.3
Zürich	16.8	18.5	22.4	21.8	20.3	18.7	18.1	17.8	16.2	13.2	11.6	15.3	13.7	12.5
Bern	17.3	17.6	18.0	15.1	16.1	13.7	15.6	17.2	14.8	15.1	8.7	9.3	8.4	7.5
Lucerne	30.0	29.1	31.7	28.6	29.8	27.9	25.5	22.6	23.1	21.8	18.4	18.5	15.6	15.4
Uri	95.2	76.0	39.0	84.7	85.5	93.2	86.0	81.7	36.6	87.3	74.3	*^{a}	*	*
Schwyz	20.4	21.3	28.0	26.0	24.3	25.9	24.0	19.1	15.4	16.7	15.5	20.6	23.1	19.6
Obwalden	32.5	*	*	*	30.4	*	*	*	*	*	*	*	11.6	47.7
Nidwalden	*	*	39.0	*	*	*	48.1	90.4	88.5	*	35.2	*	*	14.8
Glarus	42.4	*	*	*	*	*	*	*	*	*	*	*	*	*
Zug	*	23.1	32.8	33.6	34.1	32.9	22.5	25.7	22.4	21.5	19.2	17.6	14.7	13.0
Fribourg	24.7	22.1	23.0	20.0	16.7	16.1	15.9	14.8	12.8	13.8	12.8	14.2	15.4	13.3
Solothurn	34.3	38.7	39.0	37.2	36.3	32.8	25.4	25.4	24.0	21.0	18.4	21.2	18.5	17.4
Basel-Stadt	11.5	11.4	14.1	13.5	11.2	15.8	12.2	12.1	9.9	11.3	12.3^{c}	9.8^{c}	6.0^{c}	6.9^{c}
Basel-Landschaft	23.0	23.9	26.7	25.1	22.0	24.8	19.6	22.1	19.9	17.0	11.5	15.8	16.5	14.2
Schaffhausen	33.1	40.1	32.3	26.2	34.3	28.6	31.9	40.4	29.1	26.7	12.3	12.9	11.0	12.2
Appenzell A.Rh.	62.6	45.8	*	36.0	*	30.8	36.4	32.8	41.1	72.0	51.5	33.6	48.4	35.7
Appenzell I.Rh.	*	*	*	*	*	*	*	*	*	*	*	*	*	*
St. Gallen	23.6	25.1	27.6	27.5	24.0	20.0	17.0	16.9	14.7	13.6	12.3	14.3	15.0	14.4
Graubünden	14.8	18.1	22.9	20.1	18.3	18.1	16.5	15.1	15.8	19.1	11.9	13.3	13.6	13.7
Aargau	15.9	17.7	20.5	20.2	20.3	16.4	15.8	17.2	15.3	13.6	11.5	15.1	13.6	13.1
Thurgau	16.9	14.4	16.9	18.3	18.5	16.5	15.3	14.7	11.9	12.1	11.2	13.0	11.5	10.7
Ticino	38.4	39.1	36.3	37.9	34.8	29.4	30.5	27.7	29.8	28.1	24.8	23.7	20.5	21.1
Vaud	26.0	25.6	27.1	30.4	27.6	26.4	23.5	25.0	18.5	14.6	16.3^{d}	26.8	23.3	22.4
Valais	19.3	18.9	22.7	25.2	24.6	25.9	24.2	18.8	17.1	16.0	18.8	18.1	16.5	14.7
Neuchâtel	24.3	22.4	20.6	19.4	20.4	22.5	25.7	20.5	14.8	12.7	26.9	24.4	22.3	21.0
Genève	19.2	16.6	14.7	16.2	18.0	12.8	13.5	12.7	7.3	7.7	18.6	20.5	17.9	15.7
Jura	^{b}	^{b}	30.9	28.8	33.4	35.1	29.5	19.5	16.3	13.4	9.5	16.8	9.1	8.7

a.* Indicates that the party was not on the ballot in this canton.
b.Part of the Canton of Bern until 1979.
c.In Basel Stadt the FDP and Liberals (LP) have not been merged, numbers are for the FDP party.
d.In Vaud the FDP and Liberals (LP) were not merged in 2011, numbers are for the FDP party.

== Leaders ==
- Fulvio Pelli (2009–2012), Ticino
- Philipp Müller (2012–2016), Aargau
- Petra Gössi (2016–2021), Schwyz
- Thierry Burkart (2021–2025), Aargau
- Susanne Vincenz-Stauffacher (2025–present), St. Gallen (co-leader)
- Benjamin Mühlemann (2025–present), Glarus (co-leader)

== See also ==
- Liberalism and radicalism in Switzerland
