= List of members of the Federal Assembly from the Canton of Bern =

Coat of Arms

This is a list of members of both houses of the Federal Assembly from the Canton of Bern.

== Members of the Council of States ==
Councillor (Party)	Election	Councillor (Party)
Paul Migy; Free Democratic Party; 1848–1851	Appointed	Niklaus Niggeler; Free Democratic Party; 1848–1850
Paul Migy; Free Democratic Party; 1848–1851	Appointed	Eduard Eugen Blösch; Conservateurs réformés 1850–1851
Abraham Boivin; Conservateurs réformés 1851–1855	Appointed	Chr. Albrecht Kurz; Conservateurs réformés 1851–1854
Abraham Boivin; Conservateurs réformés 1851–1855	Appointed	Jakob Stämpfli; Free Democratic Party; 1854–1854
Niklaus Niggeler; Free Democratic Party; 1855–1860	Appointed	
Niklaus Niggeler; Free Democratic Party; 1855–1860	Appointed	Aimé-C. Rossel; Free Democratic Party; 1856–1856
Niklaus Niggeler; Free Democratic Party; 1855–1860	Appointed	Karl Schenk; Free Democratic Party; 1857–1863
Jakob Leuenberger; Free Democratic Party; 1860–1861	Appointed	Karl Schenk; Free Democratic Party; 1857–1863
Johann Ulrich Lehmann; Free Democratic Party; 1862–1865	Appointed	Karl Schenk; Free Democratic Party; 1857–1863
Johann Ulrich Lehmann; Free Democratic Party; 1862–1865	Appointed	Christian Sahli; Free Democratic Party; 1864–1866
Johann Sessler; Free Democratic Party; 1865–1868	Appointed	Christian Sahli; Free Democratic Party; 1864–1866
Johann Sessler; Free Democratic Party; 1865–1868	Appointed	Karl Gustav König; Party unknown 1867–1868
Christian Sahli; Free Democratic Party; 1868–1874	Appointed	Johann Weber; Démocrate puis radical 1868–1875
Constant Bodenheimer; Free Democratic Party; 1874–1878	Appointed	Johann Weber; Démocrate puis radical 1868–1875
Constant Bodenheimer; Free Democratic Party; 1874–1878	Appointed	Joh. Friedrich Hofer; Free Democratic Party; 1876–1877
Constant Bodenheimer; Free Democratic Party; 1874–1878	Appointed	Joh. Friedrich Michel; Free Democratic Party; 1877–1879
Alfred Scheurer; Free Democratic Party; 1879–1879	Appointed	Christian Sahli; Free Democratic Party; 1879–1885
B. Albert Bitzius; Free Democratic Party; 1879–1882	Appointed	Christian Sahli; Free Democratic Party; 1879–1885
Alfred Scheurer; Free Democratic Party; 1882–1883	Appointed	Christian Sahli; Free Democratic Party; 1879–1885
Albert Gobat; Free Democratic Party; 1884–1890	Appointed	Christian Sahli; Free Democratic Party; 1879–1885
Albert Gobat; Free Democratic Party; 1884–1890	Appointed	Friedrich Eggli; Free Democratic Party; 1885–1895
Hermann Lienhard; Free Democratic Party; 1890–1895	Appointed	Friedrich Eggli; Free Democratic Party; 1885–1895
Johannes Ritschard; Free Democratic Party; 1895–1903	Appointed	
Johannes Ritschard; Free Democratic Party; 1895–1903	Appointed	Alfred Scheurer; Free Democratic Party; 1896–1897
Johannes Ritschard; Free Democratic Party; 1895–1903	Appointed	Franz Bigler; Free Democratic Party; 1898–1906
Niklaus Chr. Morgenthaler; Free Democratic Party; 1903–1908	Appointed	Franz Bigler; Free Democratic Party; 1898–1906
Niklaus Chr. Morgenthaler; Free Democratic Party; 1903–1908	Appointed	Gottfried Kunz; Free Democratic Party; 1907–1919
Adolf A. A. von Steiger; Free Democratic Party; 1908–1918	Appointed	Gottfried Kunz; Free Democratic Party; 1907–1919
Leo Merz; Free Democratic Party; 1918–1919	Appointed	Gottfried Kunz; Free Democratic Party; 1907–1919
Paul Charmillot; Free Democratic Party; 1919–1932	Appointed	Carl Moser; Paysans, Artisans et Bourgeois; 1919–1935
Henri Mouttet; Free Democratic Party; 1932–1948	Appointed	Carl Moser; Paysans, Artisans et Bourgeois; 1919–1935
Henri Mouttet; Free Democratic Party; 1932–1948	Appointed	Jakob Rudolf Weber; Paysans, Artisans et Bourgeois; 1935–1957
Georges Moeckli; Social Democratic Party; 1948–1959	Appointed	Jakob Rudolf Weber; Paysans, Artisans et Bourgeois; 1935–1957
Georges Moeckli; Social Democratic Party; 1948–1959	Appointed	Dewet Buri; Paysans, Artisans et Bourgeois; 1957–1971
Charles Jeanneret; Free Democratic Party; 1959–1967	1959	Dewet Buri; Paysans, Artisans et Bourgeois; 1957–1971
Charles Jeanneret; Free Democratic Party; 1959–1967	1963	Dewet Buri; Paysans, Artisans et Bourgeois; 1957–1971
Maurice Péquignot; Free Democratic Party; 1967–1979	1967	Dewet Buri; Paysans, Artisans et Bourgeois; 1957–1971
Maurice Péquignot; Free Democratic Party; 1967–1979	1971	Fritz Krauchthaler; Swiss People's Party; 1971–1979
Maurice Péquignot; Free Democratic Party; 1967–1979	1975	Fritz Krauchthaler; Swiss People's Party; 1971–1979
Arthur Hänsenberger; Free Democratic Party; 1979–1991	1979	Peter Gerber; Swiss People's Party; 1979–1987
Arthur Hänsenberger; Free Democratic Party; 1979–1991	1983	Peter Gerber; Swiss People's Party; 1979–1987
Arthur Hänsenberger; Free Democratic Party; 1979–1991	1987	Ulrich Zimmerli; Swiss People's Party; 1987–1999
Christine Beerli; Free Democratic Party; 1991–2003	1991	Ulrich Zimmerli; Swiss People's Party; 1987–1999
Christine Beerli; Free Democratic Party; 1991–2003	1995	Ulrich Zimmerli; Swiss People's Party; 1987–1999
Christine Beerli; Free Democratic Party; 1991–2003	1999	Samuel Schmid; Swiss People's Party; 1999–2000
Christine Beerli; Free Democratic Party; 1991–2003	2001	Hans Lauri; Swiss People's Party; 2001–2007
Simonetta Sommaruga; Social Democratic Party; 2003–2010	2003	Hans Lauri; Swiss People's Party; 2001–2007
Simonetta Sommaruga; Social Democratic Party; 2003–2010	2007	Werner Luginbühl; Swiss People's Party; 2007–2019
Adrian Amstutz; Swiss People's Party; 2011–2011	2011	Werner Luginbühl; Swiss People's Party; 2007–2019
Hans Stöckli; Social Democratic Party; 2011–2023	2011	Werner Luginbühl; Swiss People's Party; 2007–2019
Hans Stöckli; Social Democratic Party; 2011–2023	2015	Werner Luginbühl; Swiss People's Party; 2007–2019
Hans Stöckli; Social Democratic Party; 2011–2023	2019	Werner Salzmann; Swiss People's Party; 2019–present
Flavia Wasserfallen; Social Democratic Party; 2023–present	2023	Werner Salzmann; Swiss People's Party; 2019–present

== Members of the National Council ==
Councillor	Party	Term start	Term end
Guillaume-Henri Dufour	Conservative	1848	1851
Friedrich Fueter	Conservative	1848	1857
Alexander L. Funk	FDP/PRD	1848	1851
Jakob Imobersteg	FDP/PRD	1848	1858
Johann Karlen	FDP/PRD	1848	1850
Karl Karrer	FDP/PRD	1848	1886
Friedrich S. Kohler	FDP/PRD	1848	1851
Albert R. S. Lohner	FDP/PRD	1848	1854
Karl J. Fr. Neuhaus	FDP/PRD	1848	1849
Ulrich J. Ochsenbein	FDP/PRD	1848	1848
Fr. Xavier I. Péquignot	Liberal	1848	1851
J.-H. Cyprien Revel	FDP/PRD	1848	1851
Johann Rudolf Schneider	FDP/PRD	1848	1866
Johannes Schneider	FDP/PRD	1848	1850
Friedrich Seiler	FDP/PRD	1848	1851
Jakob Stämpfli	FDP/PRD	1848	1854
Xavier Stockmar	Liberal	1848	1864
Johann Rudolf Vogel	FDP/PRD	1848	1869
Ludwig von Fischer	Conservative	1848	1851
Johann Anton von Tillier	FDP/PRD	1848	1851
Joh. August Weingart	FDP/PRD	1848	1860
Johann Bützberger	FDP/PRD	1849	1886
Johannes Knechtenhofer	Conservative	1850	1851
Johann Ulrich Lehmann	FDP/PRD	1850	1854
Pierre-Ignace Aubry	Conservative	1851	1854
Johannes Bach	FDP/PRD	1851	1857
Eduard Eugen Blösch	Conservative	1851	1866
F.-Xavier-M. Elsässer	Conservative	1851	1854
Johann Ulrich Gfeller	FDP/PRD	1851	1866
Johannes Hubler	FDP/PRD	1851	1858
Jakob Karlen	FDP/PRD	1851	1857
Charles Moreau	Conservative	1851	1854
Auguste Moschard	Conservative	1851	1854
Bendicht Straub	Conservative	1851	1854
Albrecht Weyermann	FDP/PRD	1851	1857
D. L. August von Gonzenbach	Conservative	1852	1860
Gottlieb Rud. Bühlmann	Conservative	1854	1857
P. A. Edouard Carlin	FDP/PRD	1854	1870
Chr. Albrecht Kurz	Conservative	1854	1864
Paul Migy	FDP/PRD	1854	1878
Sam. Friedrich Moser	FDP/PRD	1854	1857
J.-H. Cyprien Revel	FDP/PRD	1854	1869
Jakob Steiner	FDP/PRD	1854	1865
Jakob Leuenberger	FDP/PRD	1855	1857
Karl Engemann	FDP/PRD	1857	1866
Johann Jakob Karlen	FDP/PRD	1857	1872
Gottl. Ludwig Lauterburg	Conservative	1857	1860
Samuel Lehmann	FDP/PRD	1857	1872
Rudolf Schmid	FDP/PRD	1857	1863
Gottlieb Schneider	FDP/PRD	1857	1860
F. August Dür	FDP/PRD	1858	1860
Christian Sahli	FDP/PRD	1858	1863
Jakob Karlen	FDP/PRD	1859	1863
Niklaus Niggeler	FDP/PRD	1860	1866
Jakob Scherz	FDP/PRD	1860	1889
Johann Sessler	FDP/PRD	1860	1863
Johann Weber	Dém->Rad	1860	1868
Friedrich Kilian	FDP/PRD	1861	1863
Friedrich Seiler	FDP/PRD	1863	1883
Jakob Stämpfli	FDP/PRD	1863	1879
K. Wilhelm von Graffenried	FDP/PRD	1863	1866
Peter von Känel	FDP/PRD	1863	1866
Ludwig Wyss	FDP/PRD	1863	1872
Niklaus Kaiser	FDP/PRD	1864	1884
Otto R. von Büren	Conservative	1864	1884
Jakob Leuenberger	FDP/PRD	1865	1871
Rudolf Brunner	Grut*	1866	1894
Friedrich Eggli	FDP/PRD	1866	1878
Eduard Marti	FDP/PRD	1866	1878
Samuel Steiner	Conservative	1866	1872
D. L. August von Gonzenbach	Conservative	1866	1875
Carl Sam. Zyro	FDP/PRD	1866	1893
Gottlieb Riem	FDP/PRD	1867	1888
Daniel Flückiger	FDP/PRD	1869	1872
Pierre Jolissaint	FDP/PRD	1869	1878
Andreas Schmid	FDP/PRD	1869	1872
H.-Auguste Klaye	FDP/PRD	1870	1890
Albert Friedrich Born	FDP/PRD	1871	1879
Alexander Bucher	FDP/PRD	1872	1881
Gottfried Joost	FDP/PRD	1872	1881
Walter Munzinger	Conservative	1872	1873
Hippolyte Paulet	FDP/PRD	1872	1879
Wilhelm Joh. Teuscher	FDP/PRD	1872	1881
Friedrich K. G. von Werdt	FDP/PRD	1872	1881
Daniel Flückiger	FDP/PRD	1873	1875
Johannes Ritschard	FDP/PRD	1873	1883
Alfred Scheurer	FDP/PRD	1873	1875
Rudolf Leuenberger	FDP/PRD	1875	1887
Fr. Rudolf J. Rohr	FDP/PRD	1875	1888
Fritz E. Bühlmann	FDP/PRD	1876	1919
Abraham Boivin	Conservative	1878	1881
Charles-L. Kuhn	FDP/PRD	1878	1886
Albert Morel	Conservative	1878	1881
Johannes Schlup	FDP/PRD	1878	1887
Joh. Friedrich Gugelmann	FDP/PRD	1879	1890
Rudolf Niggeler	FDP/PRD	1879	1887
Joseph Stockmar	FDP/PRD	1879	1897
Gottlieb Berger	FDP/PRD	1881	1902
Henri Cuenat	FDP/PRD	1881	1896
Ernest Francillon	FDP/PRD	1881	1890
Johann Jakob Hauser	FDP/PRD	1881	1891
Andreas Schmid	FDP/PRD	1881	1887
Jules Schnyder	Liberal	1881	1884
Bendicht Tschannen	FDP/PRD	1881	1884
Johann Zürcher	FDP/PRD	1881	1892
Johann Jakob Rebmann	FDP/PRD	1883	1919
Mathäus Zurbuchen	FDP/PRD	1883	1902
Pierre Jolissaint	FDP/PRD	1884	1896
Eduard Marti	FDP/PRD	1884	1896
Eduard Müller	FDP/PRD	1884	1895
Karl Stämpfli	Liberal	1884	1893
Karl Engel	Conservative	1886	1887
Adolf Müller	FDP/PRD	1886	1911
Johannes Schär	Conservative	1886	1890
Traugott-Philipp Eduard Bähler	FDP/PRD	1887	1908
Ulrich Burkhalter	BeVP*	1887	1893
Emil Elsässer	Conservative	1887	1890
Rudolf Häni	FDP/PRD	1887	1896
Johann Zimmermann	FDP/PRD	1887	1911
K. Fr. Edmund von Steiger	VKons	1888	1890
Arnold Gottlieb Bühler	FDP/PRD	1889	1922
Gottfried Joost	FDP/PRD	1889	1899
Gottfried Bangerter	FDP/PRD	1890	1902
Fr.-Joseph Choquard	Conservative	1890	1895
Albert Gobat	FDP/PRD	1890	1914
Ernst Aug. Grieb	FDP/PRD	1890	1893
Johann Jenny	PAB	1890	1935
Jakob Adolf Roth	Conservative	1890	1893
K. Fr. Edmund von Steiger	Liberal	1891	1908
Hans Dinkelmann	FDP/PRD	1893	1905
Gottfried Feller	FDP/PRD	1893	1896
Emil F. Moser	FDP/PRD	1893	1902
K. Franz J. Neuhaus	FDP/PRD	1893	1902
S. J. Ernst Wyss	LPS/PLS	1893	1896
Johann D. Hirter	FDP/PRD	1894	1919
Johann Rudolf Steinhauer	proc Rad*	1894	1902
Casimir Folletête	Conservative	1895	1900
Jean von Wattenwyl	Liberal	1895	1896
Joseph-Auguste Boinay	Conservative	1896	1899
Friedrich Bürgi	FDP/PRD	1896	1908
Jakob Freiburghaus	FDP/PRD	1896	1927
Virgile Rossel	FDP/PRD	1896	1912
Eduard Ruchti	FDP/PRD	1896	1902
Theodor Sourbeck	FDP/PRD	1896	1899
Eduard Will	FDP/PRD	1896	1919
Louis Emile Peteut	FDP/PRD	1897	1899
Emile Boéchat	FDP/PRD	1899	1902
Albert-A. Locher	FDP/PRD	1899	1917
S. J. Ernst Wyss	LPS/PLS	1899	1914
Fritz Zumstein	FDP/PRD	1899	1917
Fr.-Joseph Choquard	Conservative	1901	1928
Ernest Daucourt	Conservative	1902	1919
Ulrich Dürrenmatt	PP	1902	1908
Arnold Gugelmann	FDP/PRD	1902	1917
Michael Hofer	FDP/PRD	1902	1919
Eugen Huber	FDP/PRD	1902	1911
Louis Joliat	FDP/PRD	1902	1904
Emil Lohner	FDP/PRD	1902	1927
Friedrich Michel	FDP/PRD	1902	1919
Johann Jakob Schär	FDP/PRD	1902	1919
Johannes Ritschard	FDP/PRD	1903	1908
F. C. Henri Simonin	FDP/PRD	1904	1917
Friedrich Buri	FDP/PRD	1905	1919
Gustav König	Conservative	1908	1917
Alfred Moll	FDP/PRD	1908	1919
August Rikli	SP/PS	1908	1921
Jakob Scheidegger	FDP/PRD	1908	1917
Robert Stucki	FDP/PRD	1908	1919
Michael Bühler	FDP/PRD	1911	1917
Friedrich Minder	FDP/PRD	1911	1919
Gustav A. A. Müller	SP/PS	1911	1921
Johann Näher	SP/PS	1911	1917
Karl Scheurer	FDP/PRD	1911	1919
Hermann Schüpbach	FDP/PRD	1911	1935
Robert B. Savoye	FDP/PRD	1912	1917
Fritz Burren	Conservative	1914	1926
J. Emile Ryser	SP/PS	1914	1922
Hermann Brand	SP/PS	1917	1920
Emil Düby	SP/PS	1917	1920
Maurice Goetschel	FDP/PRD	1917	1921
Achille-Tell Grospierre	SP/PS	1917	1935
August Huggler	SP/PS	1917	1939
Xavier J. J. B. Jobin	Conservative	1917	1919
Arnold L. E. Knellwolf	Grut&PS*	1917	1919
Felix Koch	FDP/PRD	1917	1918
Carl Moser	FDP/PRD	1917	1919
Friedrich Oskar Schneeberger	SP/PS	1917	1931
Konrad Ilg	SP/PS	1918	1919
Adolf Bucher	SP/PS	1919	1928
Gottfried Gnägi	PAB	1919	1939
Ernst Otto Graf	FDP/PRD	1919	1939
Johann Jakob Hadorn	SP/PS	1919	1928
Walter Hämmerli	PAB	1919	1920
Ernst Jakob	SP/PS	1919	1922
Fritz Joss	PAB	1919	1939
Richard König	PAB	1919	1934
Rudolf Minger	PAB	1919	1929
Jean-Théodor Moeckli	FDP/PRD	1919	1922
Fr. Ferdinand Rothpletz	PAB	1919	1922
Friedrich Siegenthaler	PAB	1919	1935
Friedrich Spichiger	PAB	1919	1922
Hans Stähli	PAB	1919	1951
Hans Tschumi	PAB	1919	1935
Jakob Rudolf Weber	PAB	1919	1935
Robert Grimm	SP/PS	1920	1955
Oskar Läuffer	SP/PS	1920	1922
Friedrich Michel	PAB	1920	1922
Rudolf Baumann	Grut*	1921	1922
Ernst Reinhard	SP/PS	1921	1928
Frédéric Schwarz	FDP/PRD	1921	1922
Paul Billieux	FDP/PRD	1922	1931
Hans Blaser	SP/PS	1922	1928
Robert Bratschi	SP/PS	1922	1967
Peter Bratschi	SP/PS	1922	1925
Otto Burger	PAB	1922	1925
Eugène Girod	PAB	1922	1925
Alfred Held	PAB	1922	1925
Konrad Ilg	SP/PS	1922	1947
Xavier J. J. B. Jobin	Conservative	1922	1931
Jakob Leuenberger	PAB	1922	1925
Johann Nyffeler	PAB	1922	1928
Arnold Spychiger	FDP/PRD	1922	1931
Ernest Bütikofer	SP/PS	1925	1928
Hans Lanz	PAB	1925	1928
Oskar Läuffer	SP/PS	1925	1925
Guido Müller	SP/PS	1925	1943
Hans Roth	SP/PS	1925	1955
Henri Auguste Sandoz	FDP/PRD	1925	1934
Alfred Held	PAB	1926	1928
Jakob Leuenberger	PAB	1927	1931
Peter Balmer	FDP/PRD	1928	1935
Germain-Joseph Carnat	PAB	1928	1939
Joseph Ceppi	Conservative	1928	1939
Max Gafner	PAB	1928	1943
Werner Hadorn	PAB	1928	1935
Hans Müller	PAB	1928	1947
Hermann Oldani	SP/PS	1928	1934
Fritz Schmidlin	SP/PS	1928	1931
Rudolf Schmutz	PAB	1928	1947
Robert Wagner	SP/PS	1928	1931
Alfred Held	PAB	1929	1947
Ernst Bürki	PAB	1931	1951
Friedrich Marbach	SP/PS	1931	1933
Ernst Reichen	FDP/PRD	1931	1935
Ernst Reinhard	SP/PS	1931	1947
Fritz Schmidlin	SP/PS	1933	1955
Paul Billieux	FDP/PRD	1934	1943
Friedrich Flück	SP/PS	1934	1935
Johann Ueltschi	PAB	1934	1935
Ernst Anliker	JB	1935	1943
Fritz Bigler	JB	1935	1943
Samuel Brawand	SP/PS	1935	1947
Gottlieb Duttweiler	LDU/LdI	1935	1940
Markus Feldmann	PAB	1935	1945
Hans Gfeller	PAB	1935	1963
Hans Hofer	PAB	1935	1953
Ernst Jakob	SP/PS	1935	1939
Georges Moeckli	SP/PS	1935	1938
Walter Stucki	FDP/PRD	1935	1937
Fritz von Almen	FDP/PRD	1935	1947
Hans Gottfried Müller	FDP/PRD	1937	1943
Fritz Giovanoli	SP/PS	1938	1939
Ernst Bärtschi	FDP/PRD	1939	1951
Gottlieb Bühler	PAB	1939	1943
Henry Burrus	Conservative	1939	1947
Jean Gressot	Conservative	1939	1955
Carl Künzi	PAB	1939	1943
Herbert Moos	LDU/LdI	1939	1941
Arnold Seematter	FDP/PRD	1939	1954
Ernest Vuille	SP/PS	1939	1943
Max Weber	SP/PS	1939	1951
Paul Andres	LDU/LdI	1941	1943
Ernst Schmid	PAB	1941	1950
Ernst Barben	JB	1943	1947
Paul Burgdorfer	PAB	1943	1967
Eduard Freimüller	SP/PS	1943	1963
Fritz Giovanoli	SP/PS	1943	1946
Emile Giroud	SP/PS	1943	1951
Fritz Meyer	SP/PS	1943	1954
Virgile Moine	FDP/PRD	1943	1948
Alfred Ryter	SP/PS	1943	1947
Ernst Studer	FDP/PRD	1943	1963
Johann Ueltschi	PAB	1943	1943
Georg Wander	PAB	1943	1946
Woldemar Wiedmer	PAB	1943	1945
Hans Kästli	PAB	1945	1959
Johann Ueltschi	PAB	1945	1947
Werner Meister	PAB	1946	1959
Friedrich Segessenmann	SP/PS	1946	1947
Ernst Aebersold	SP/PS	1947	1958
Dewet Buri	PAB	1947	1957
Albert Fawer	SP/PS	1947	1951
Markus Feldmann	PAB	1947	1951
Karl Geissbühler	SP/PS	1947	1951
Fritz Grütter	SP/PS	1947	1971
Ernst Jakob	SP/PS	1947	1950
Paul Kunz	FDP/PRD	1947	1955
Louis Lovis	Conservative	1947	1951
Hans Gottfried Müller	FDP/PRD	1947	1963
Arthur Steiner	SP/PS	1947	1958
Hans Tschumi	PAB	1947	1960
André Calame	FDP/PRD	1948	1951
Alfred Held	PAB	1950	1951
Walter Stünzi	SP/PS	1950	1959
Gottlieb Duttweiler	LDU/LdI	1951	1962
Walter Egger	FDP/PRD	1951	1955
Ernest Josi	FDP/PRD	1951	1959
Hermann Kurz	SP/PS	1951	1955
Georges Luterbacher	PAB	1951	1955
Gustav Morf	LDU/LdI	1951	1953
Etienne Philippe	Conservative	1951	1956
Paul Rufener	PAB	1951	1959
Hans Weber	PAB	1951	1971
Karl Geissbühler	SP/PS	1952	1967
Hans Stähli	PAB	1952	1955
Rudolf Gnägi	PAB	1953	1965
Alfred Grütter	LDU/LdI	1953	1955
Robert Bauder	FDP/PRD	1954	1955
Christian Rubi	SP/PS	1954	1959
Emil Baumgartner	FDP/PRD	1955	1967
Samuel Brawand	SP/PS	1955	1967
Hans Düby	SP/PS	1955	1975
Rudolf Etter	PAB	1955	1979
Fritz Giovanoli	SP/PS	1955	1963
Emile Giroud	SP/PS	1955	1963
Georg Rutishauser	FDP/PRD	1955	1963
Hans Tschanz	PAB	1955	1971
Walo von Greyerz	FDP/PRD	1955	1967
Max Weber	SP/PS	1955	1971
Rainer Weibel	Conservative	1955	1967
Jean Gressot	Conservative	1956	1959
Fritz Geissbühler	PAB	1957	1967
Erwin Schneider	SP/PS	1958	1962
Jakob Bächtold	LDU/LdI	1959	1975
Otto Bienz	PAB	1959	1966
Erwin Freiburghaus	PAB	1959	1979
Henri Geiser	PAB	1959	1971
Simon Kohler	FDP/PRD	1959	1975
Walter König	SP/PS	1959	1965
Jean Wilhelm	CCS	1959	1979
Ernst Wüthrich	SP/PS	1959	1975
Hans Burren	PAB	1960	1963
Casimir Huber	LDU/LdI	1962	1971
Emil Schaffer	SP/PS	1962	1979
André Auroi	SP/PS	1963	1967
Fritz Blatti	FDP/PRD	1963	1975
Walther Hofer	PAB	1963	1979
Richard Müller	SP/PS	1963	1983
Reynold Tschäppät	SP/PS	1963	1979
Hans Tschumi	PAB	1963	1979
Erich Weisskopf	FDP/PRD	1963	1971
Otto M. Wenger	FDP/PRD	1963	1971
Ernst Jaggi	SP/PS	1965	1971
Armin Haller	PAB	1966	1969
Fritz Marthaler	PAB	1966	1977
Paul Aebischer	EVP/PEV	1967	1971
Walter Augsburger	PAB	1967	1983
Ernst Bircher	SP/PS	1967	1975
Adolf Blaser	SP/PS	1967	1970
Heinz Bratschi	SP/PS	1967	1987
Otto Fischer	FDP/PRD	1967	1983
Karl Glatthard	FDP/PRD	1967	1971
Walter Rohner	CCS	1967	1971
Fred Rubi	SP/PS	1967	1987
Otto Locher	PAB	1969	1971
Erwin Schneider	SP/PS	1970	1971
Pierre Gassmann	SP/PS	1971	1979
Paul Gehler	SVP/UDC	1971	1979
Fritz Hofmann	SVP/UDC	1971	1987
Raoul Kohler	FDP/PRD	1971	1991
Valentin Oehen	N	1971	1987
Friedrich Salzmann	LDU/LdI	1971	1978
Heinrich Schnyder	SVP/UDC	1971	1987
Gerhart Schürch	FDP/PRD	1971	1979
Hans Ueltschi	SVP/UDC	1971	1979
Arthur Villard	SP/PS	1971	1979
Eduard von Waldkirch	N	1971	1972
Otto (senior) Zwygart	EVP/PEV	1971	1983
Bernhard König	N	1972	1975
Ulrich Ammann	FDP/PRD	1975	1987
Andreas Blum	SP/PS	1975	1979
Ernst Eggenberg	SP/PS	1975	1991
Urs Kunz	FDP/PRD	1975	1983
Francis Loetscher	SP/PS	1975	1983
Werner Meier	SP/PS	1975	1983
Roland Stähli	FDP/PRD	1975	1979
Fritz Räz	SVP/UDC	1977	1983
Jakob Bächtold	LDU/LdI	1978	1979
Geneviève Aubry	FDP/PRD	1979	1995
Richard Bäumlin	SP/PS	1979	1989
Jean-Claude Crevoisier	SP/PS	1979	1983
Jean-Paul Gehler	SVP/UDC	1979	1987
Gottlieb Geissbühler	SVP/UDC	1979	1987
Paul Günter	LDU/LdI	1979	1991
Fritz Hari	SVP/UDC	1979	1995
Marc-André Houmard	FDP/PRD	1979	1991
Werner Martignoni	SVP/UDC	1979	1987
Bernhard Müller	SVP/UDC	1979	1987
Alfred Neukomm	SP/PS	1979	1991
Adolf Ogi	SVP/UDC	1979	1987
Fritz Reimann	SP/PS	1979	1991
Jean-Pierre Bonny	FDP/PRD	1983	1995
Jean Clivaz	SP/PS	1983	1987
Hermann Fehr	SP/PS	1983	1990
Barbara Gurtner	PdA/PST	1983	1987
Kurt Meyer	SP/PS	1983	1987
Leni Robert	LL	1983	1986
Markus Ruf	0	1983	1995
Peter Sager	SVP/UDC	1983	1991
Otto Zwygart	EVP/PEV	1983	1995
Lukas Fierz	LL	1986	1991
Rosmarie Bär	LL	1987	1995
Ursula Bäumlin	SP/PS	1987	1995
Franz Dietrich	CVP/PDC	1987	1991
Rudolf Hafner	LL	1987	1994
Gret Haller	SP/PS	1987	1994
François Loeb	FDP/PRD	1987	1995
Paul Luder	SVP/UDC	1987	1992
Albrecht Rychen	SVP/UDC	1987	1995
Jürg Scherrer	0	1987	1995
Heinz Schwab	SVP/UDC	1987	1994
Hanspeter Seiler	SVP/UDC	1987	1995
William Wyss	SVP/UDC	1987	1991
Elisabeth Zölch	SVP/UDC	1987	1994
Susanna Daepp-Heiniger	SVP/UDC	1988	1994
Peter Vollmer	SP/PS	1989	1995
Georges Eggenberger	SP/PS	1990	1995
Ruedi Baumann	GPS/PES	1991	1995
Peter Jenni	0	1991	1995
Leni Robert	LL	1991	1995
Werner Scherrer	0	1991	1995
Walter Schmied	SVP/UDC	1991	1995
Fritz Stalder	SD/DS	1991	1995
Rudolf Strahm	SP/PS	1991	1995
Marc Frédéric Suter	FDP/PRD	1991	1995
Alexander Tschäppät	SP/PS	1991	1995
Jean-Claude Zwahlen	AJU	1991	1995
William Wyss	SVP/UDC	1992	1995
Stephanie Baumann	SP/PS	1994	1995
Simon Schenk	SVP/UDC	1994	1995
Samuel Schmid	SVP/UDC	1994	1995
Verena Singeisen	LL	1994	1995
Hermann Weyeneth	SVP/UDC	1994	1995
Käthi Bangerter	FDP/PRD	1995	2003
Ruedi Baumann	GPS/PES	1995	2003
Stephanie Baumann	SP/PS	1995	2003
Ursula Bäumlin	SP/PS	1995	1998
Jean-Pierre Bonny	FDP/PRD	1995	1999
Hubert Frainier	CVP/PDC	1995	1995
Paul Günter	SP/PS	1995	2007
Norbert Hochreutener	CVP/PDC	1995	1999
François Loeb	FDP/PRD	1995	1999
Fritz Abraham Oehrli	SVP/UDC	1995	2007
Markus Ruf	Ind.	1995	1999
Albrecht Rychen	SVP/UDC	1995	1999
Simon Schenk	SVP/UDC	1995	2003
Werner Scherrer	0	1995	1997
Jürg Scherrer	0	1995	1999
Samuel Schmid	SVP/UDC	1995	1999
Walter Schmied	SVP/UDC	1995	2007
Hanspeter Seiler	SVP/UDC	1995	2003
Rudolf Strahm	SP/PS	1995	2004
Marc Frédéric Suter	FDP/PRD	1995	2003
Franziska Teuscher	GB	1995	2013
Alexander Tschäppät	SP/PS	1995	2003
Ruth-Gaby Vermot-Mangold	SP/PS	1995	2007
Peter Vollmer	SP/PS	1995	2007
Hansueli von Allmen	SP/PS	1995	1999
Hermann Weyeneth	SVP/UDC	1995	2007
William Wyss	SVP/UDC	1995	1999
Otto Zwygart	EVP/PEV	1995	2000
Christian Waber	EDU/UDF	1997	1999
Barbara Geiser	SP/PS	1998	1999
Remo Giosué Galli	CVP/PDC	1999	2003
Ursula Haller	SVP/UDC	1999	2014
Bernhard Hess	SD/DS	1999	2007
Rudolf Joder	SVP/UDC	1999	2015
Johann N. Schneider	FDP/PRD	1999	2010
Simonetta Sommaruga	SP/PS	1999	2003
Pierre Triponez	FDP/PRD	1999	2011
Christian Waber	EDU/UDF	1999	2009
Hansruedi Wandfluh	SVP/UDC	1999	2014
Kurt Wasserfallen	FDP/PRD	1999	2006
Ursula Wyss	SP/PS	1999	2013
Annemarie Huber-Hotz	FDP/PRD	1999	2007
Walter Donzé	EVP/PEV	2000	2010
Evi Allemann	SP/PS	2003	2018
Adrian Amstutz	SVP/UDC	2003	2023
André Daguet	SP/PS	2003	2011
Therese Frösch	GB	2003	2011
Norbert Hochreutener	CVP/PDC	2003	2011
Rudolf Joder	SVP/UDC	2003	2015
Margret Kiener Nellen	SP/PS	2003	2023
Christa Markwalder Bär	FDP/PRD	2003	2023
Simon Schenk	SVP/UDC	2003	2011
Hermann Weyeneth	SVP/UDC	2003	2007
Hans Stöckli	SP/PS	2004	2011
Andreas Aebi	SVP/UDC	2007	2023
Andrea Martina Geissbühler	SVP/UDC	2007	2023
Jean-Pierre Graber	SVP/UDC	2007	2011
Hans Grunder	SVP/UDC	2007	2023
Ricardo Lumengo	SP/PS	2007	2011
Marc Frédéric Suter	FDP/PRD	2007	2007
Alec von Graffenried	GPS/PES	2007	2015
Erich von Siebenthal	SVP/UDC	2007	2023
Christian Wasserfallen	FDP/PRD	2007	Incumbent
Andreas Brönnimann	EDU/UDF	2009	2011
Peter Flück	FDP/PLR	2010	2011
Marianne Streiff-Feller	EVP/PEV	2010	2023
Matthias Aebischer	SP/PS	2011	Incumbent
Kathrin Bertschy	GLP/PVL	2011	2023
Thomas Fuchs	SVP/UDC	2011	2011
Urs Gasche	BDP/PBD	2011	2017
Jürg Grossen	GLP/PVL	2011	Incumbent
Lorenz Hess	BDP/PBD	2011	Incumbent
Corrado Pardini	SP/PS	2011	2023
Nadja Pieren	SVP/UDC	2011	2023
Albert Rösti	SVP/UDC	2011	2023
Regula Rytz	GPS/PES	2011	2023
Alexander Tschäppät	SP/PS	2011	2018
Nadine Masshardt	SP/PS	2013	Incumbent
Aline Trede	GPS/PES	2013	Incumbent
Heinz Siegenthaler	BDP/PBD	2014	2023
Manfred Bühler	SVP/UDC	2015	Incumbent
Jean-Pierre Graber	SVP/UDC	2015	2015
Christine Häsler	GPS/PES	2015	2015
Christine Häsler	GPS/PES	2015	2018
Erich Hess	SVP/UDC	2015	Incumbent
Werner Salzmann	SVP/UDC	2015	2023
Flavia Wasserfallen	SP/PS	2018	Incumbent
Adrian Wüthrich	SP/PS	2018	2023
Christine Badertscher	GPS/PES	2019	Incumbent
Kilian Baumann	GPS/PES	2019	Incumbent
Melanie Mettler	GLP/PVL	2019	Incumbent
Kathrin Bertshy	GLP/PVL	2019	Incumbent
Tamara Funiciello	SP/PS	2019	Incumbent
Lars Guggisberg	SVP/UDC	2019	Incumbent
Nadja Umbricht Pieren	SVP/UDC	2019	Incumbent
Andreas Gafner	EDU	2019	Incumbent
Marc Jost	EVP	2019	Incumbent
Werner Salzmann	SVP/UDC	2023	Incumbent
Katja Riem	SVP/UDC	2023	Incumbent
Thomas Knutti	SVP/UDC	2023	Incumbent
Ernst Wandfluh	SVP/UDC	2023	Incumbent
Ursula Zybach	SP/PS	2023	Incumbent
Reto Nause	The Centre	2023	Incumbent
