= Nils Fiechter =

Swiss politician (born 1996)

Member of the Grand Council of Bern
- Incumbent
- Assumed office 8 November 2023
- Preceded by: Thomas Knutti
- Constituency: Oberland

President of the Young SVP
- Incumbent
- Assumed office 10 March 2024
- Preceded by: David Trachsel

Personal details
- Born: Nils Miles Fiechter; 18 August 1996 (age 29) Thun, Switzerland
- Citizenship: Switzerland; Canada
- Party: Swiss People's Party
- Other political affiliations: Young SVP
- Occupation: Municipal administrator, politician
- Website: Official website Council website

Nils Miles Fiechter (Swiss Standard German: [ˈfiːçtər]; born 18 August 1996) is a Swiss politician who currently serves on the Grand Council of Bern for the Swiss People's Party since 2023. Concurrently he also serves as president of the Young SVP since 2024.

Although he was born in Switzerland, he is Swiss Canadian, by his maternal family, and holds dual citizenship of both countries. In 2022, Fiechter was convicted by the Federal Supreme Court of Switzerland, on racial discrimination charges. Specifically regarding discrimination against Romani people.

By the Bernese daily newspaper, Berner Zeitung, Fiechter has been referred to as "the young Donald Trump of Frutigen" in 2017.

== Early life and education ==
Fiechter was born 18 August 1996 in Thun, Switzerland, to a Swiss father and Canadian-born Theresa Fiechter (née Sidler). His maternal grandmother resides in New Jersey. Between 2012 and 2015 he completed a commercial apprenticeship in municipal administration at the town hall of Kandersteg.

== Career ==
Fiechter has been employed as communal secretary in Oberwil im Simmental since 2019. He previously worked at the Department of Social Insurance ("Amt für Sozialversicherungen") at the Canton of Bern.

In June 2024, Fiechter surprised with an interview in Russia Today, criticising a Peace Conference in Switzerland. David Noser from the Young GLP criticized the fact that the "party president [Nils Fiechter] is allowing himself to be used for Russian propaganda".
