= Andrea Zryd =

Swiss politician (born 1975)

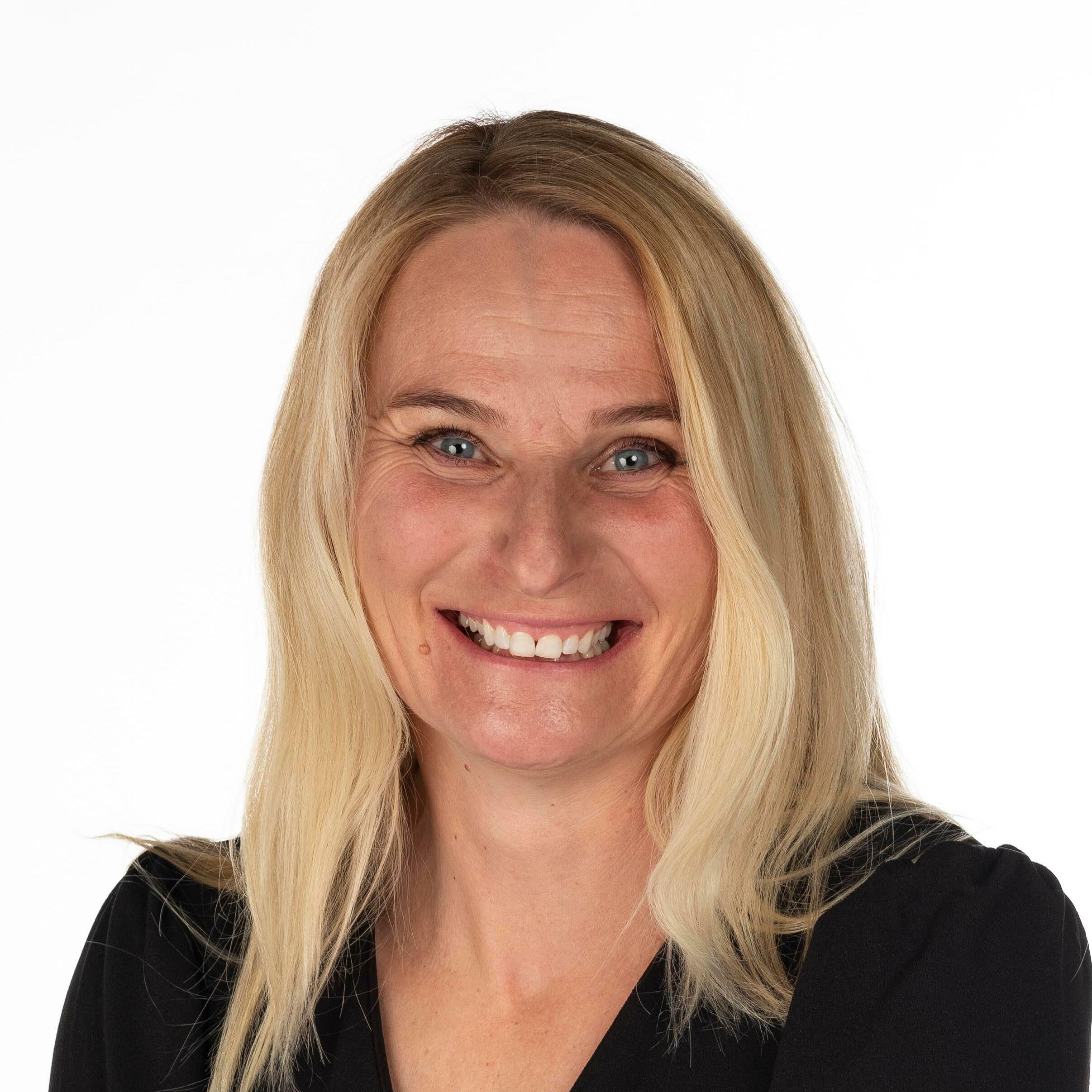
- Official portrait, 2023

Member of the National Council (Switzerland)
- Incumbent
- Assumed office 4 December 2023
- Preceded by: Flavia Wasserfallen
- Constituency: Canton of Bern

Member of the Grand Council of Bern
- In office 1 June 2014 - 7 December 2023

Personal details
- Born: Andrea Zryd; 25 October 1975 (age 50) Adelboden, Switzerland
- Domestic partner: Alexander Reinhard
- Children: 2
- Website: Official website Parliament website

Andrea Zryd (German pronunciation: [ˌanˈdreːa ˈzrit]; born 24 October 1975) is a Swiss physical education teacher and politician who currently serves on the National Council (Switzerland) for the Social Democratic Party since 2023.

== Career ==
She previously served as a member of the Grand Council of Bern for two terms, initially from 2004 to 2010, and more recently from 2014 to 2023.
