= Aline Trede =

Swiss politician

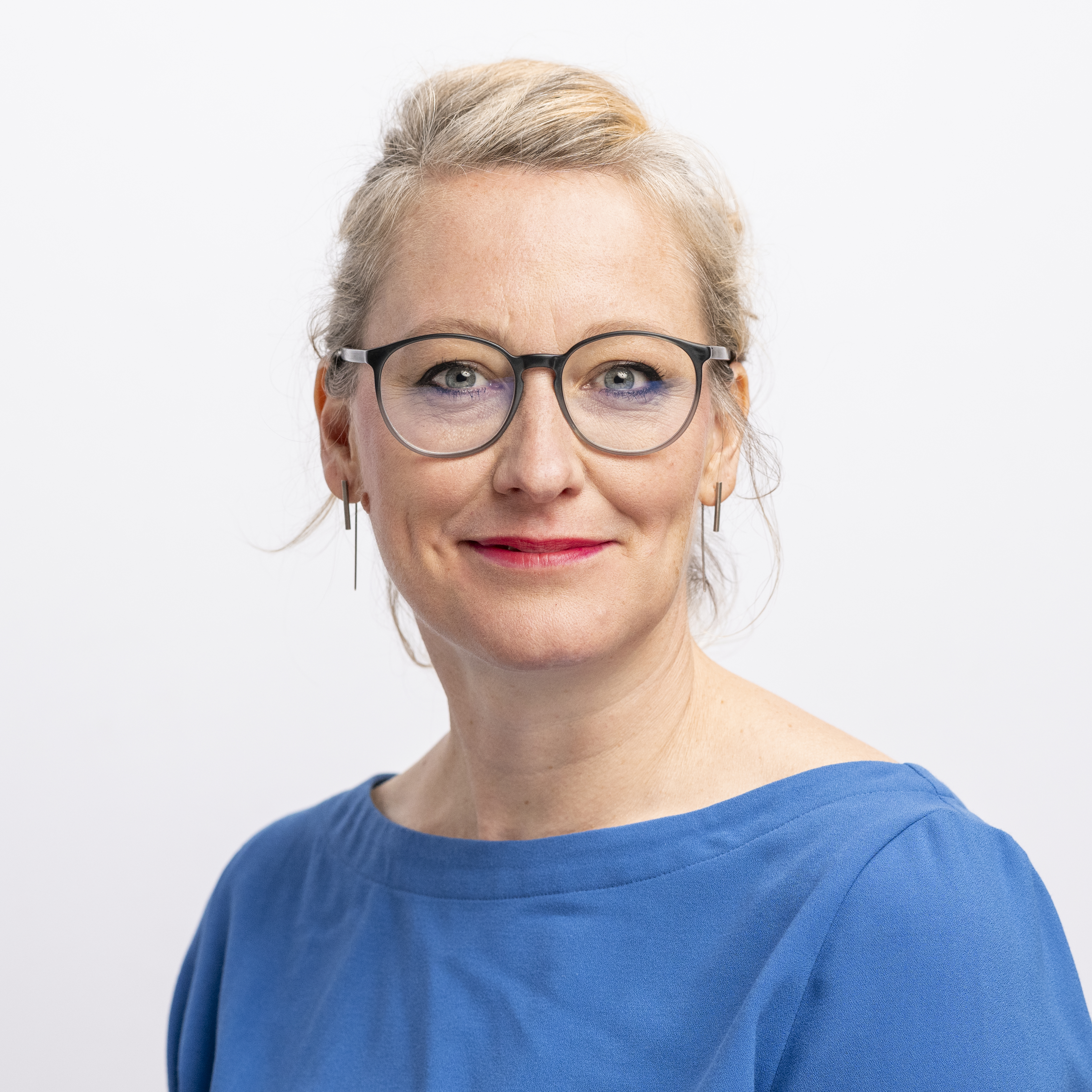
- Official portrait, 2023

Member of the National Council (Switzerland)
- Incumbent
- Assumed office 29 May 2018
- Preceded by: Franziska Teuscher
- Constituency: Canton of Bern
- In office 4 March 2013 – 29 November 2015

Personal details
- Born: Aline Trede; August 26, 1983 (age 42) Bern, Switzerland
- Citizenship: Switzerland; Germany
- Party: Green Party of Switzerland
- Spouse: Joel Widmer (m. 2014; div. 2020)
- Domestic partner: Thomas Peter (since 2020)
- Children: 2
- Education: Gymnasium Kirchenfeld
- Alma mater: ETH Zurich (MSc)
- Website: Official website Parliament website

Aline Trede (German pronunciation: [əˈliːn ˈteɪd]; 26 August 1983) is a Swiss-German politician who currently serves on the National Council (Switzerland) for the Green Party since 2018. She previously served one term between 2013 and 2015 and also on the City of Berne Parliament from 2009 to 2012.

== Early life and education ==
Trede was born 26 August 1983 in Bern, Switzerland to Richard Trede (b. 1951), former head of youth pedagogy and care of the Child and Adolescent Psychiatry of the Canton of Bern, and Monika Trede (née Ensner). Her father was originally from Germany and her mother hailed from Basel. She attended the Gymnasium Kirchenfeld Bern, studied environmental sciences at the ETH Zurich.

== Political career ==
From 2009 to 2012, Aline Trede was a member of the City of Berne Parliament (City Council) as a representative of the Green Alliance. She was president of the Association for More Humane Vehicles, the supporting association of the so-called Stop Offroader Initiative. She is a former coordinator of the Young Greens Switzerland. From 2008 to 2012, she was vice-president of the Green Party of Switzerland.

Aline Trede took over the National Council seat of her party colleague Franziska Teuscher, who resigned, on 4 March 2013, but lost it again in the 2015 renewal elections. In 2013, she lost to SP National Councillor Evi Allemann in the election for Central President of the Swiss Association for Transport and Environment (VCS). Trede slipped back into the National Council in summer 2018 to replace Christine Häsler, who resigned and was elected to the Government Council. She is a member of the Group for a Switzerland without an Army (GSoA) and on the board of the Digital Society Switzerland.

In the parliamentary elections of 20 October 2019, Trede was directly elected to the National Council for the first time after twice moving up for the Greens. In May 2020, she was elected leader of the 35-member Green parliamentary group in the Federal Assembly.

== Personal life ==
Trede holds dual citizenship of Switzerland and Germany. She is divorced, has two children and lives in Bern. Musically, she was active in the Bern city council band FraktionsZwang.
