= Wasserfallen =

Wasserfallen is a surname. Notable people with the surname include:

- Christian Wasserfallen (born 1981), Swiss businessman, engineer and politician
- Flavia Wasserfallen (born 1979), Swiss politician
