= Katja Riem =

Swiss politician (born 1996)

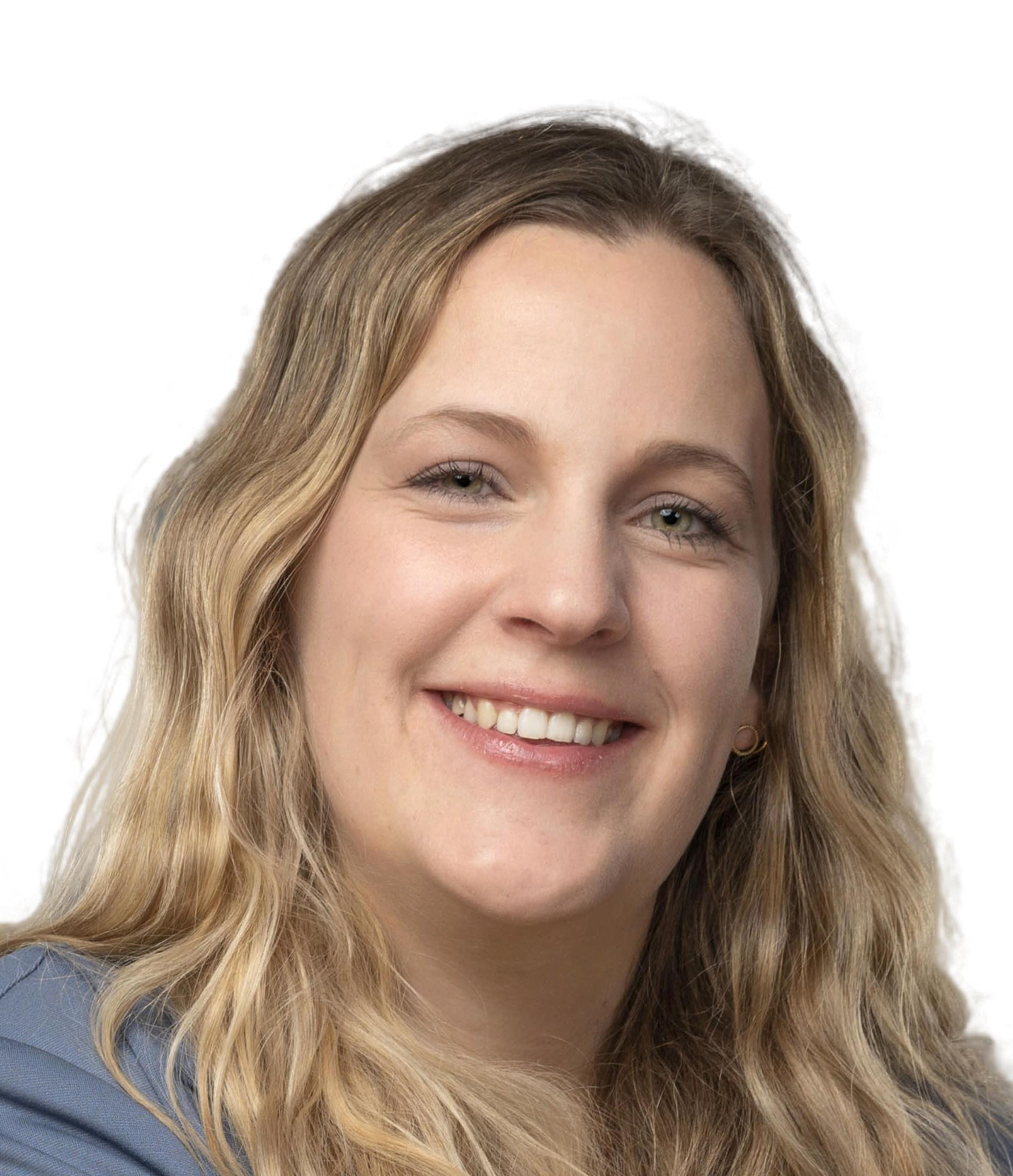
- Official portrait, 2023

Member of the National Council (Switzerland)
- Incumbent
- Assumed office 4 December 2023
- Constituency: Canton of Bern

Member of the Grand Council of Bern
- In office 1 September 2021 – 31 October 2023
- Preceded by: Moritz Müller
- Succeeded by: Roland Iseli

Personal details
- Born: Katja Riem; 26 December 1996 (age 29) Oberdiessbach, Switzerland
- Party: Swiss People's Party
- Relations: Gottlieb Riem (4x great-grandfather)
- Education: Bern University of Applied Sciences (BSc)
- Occupation: Winemaker; farmer; agriculturist
- Website: Official website Parliament website

Katja Riem (German pronunciation: [ˈkatja ˈriːm]; born 26 December 1996) is a Swiss winemaker and politician who currently is a member of the National Council (Switzerland) for the Swiss People's Party after being elected in the 2023 Swiss federal election. She assumed office on 4 December 2023. Riem previously served on the Grand Council of Bern between 2021 and 2023.

== Early life and education ==
Riem was born 26 December 1996 in Oberdiessbach, Switzerland, to Herbert Riem, wine merchant and farmer, and Beatrice Riem (née Utiger). Her parents are the owners of Riem Daepp & Co Ltd., wine merchants, founded in 1933. Her paternal uncle, Bernard Riem, is a member of the Grand Council of Bern for The Centre. Further, Riem is a 4x great-granddaughter of Gottlieb Riem, who served on the National Council from 1867 to 1888, for the Free Radical Liberals.

She was raised in Kiesen and obtained her Matura at Gymnasium Kirchenfeld in Bern. Upon graduating, she completed a 3-year-program in winemaking which she was able to complete early in only 2 years while working in Bern, La Neuveville and in the winery of Teufen Castle in Teufen. Then she completed a 3-year apprenticeship as farmer. At the Bern University of Applied Sciences (HAFL) she received a Bachelor of Science in agronomy.

== Political career ==
She became an active member of the Young SVP aged 14 and was ultimately elected to Grand Council of Bern on 1 September 2021. There she has been the youngest member-elect and became prominent on land use issues. She resigned from this post on 31 October 2023 being succeeded by Roland Iseli. During the 2023 Swiss federal election, Riem was elected to National Council (Switzerland). She assumed office as the youngest member of the 52. legislative period on 4 December 2023.

== Personal life ==
Riem resides is single and resides in Kiesen, Switzerland.
