= Emil Lohner =

Swiss politician

- Born: Karl Emil Lohnwr; 15 April 1865; Thun, Oberland, Bern, Switzerland
- Died: 24 February 1959 (aged 93); Thun, Oberland, Bern, Switzerland
- Education: Bern
- Occupations: Municipal politician and mayor Cantonal politician National politician Railway director Diplomat
- Political party: FDP/PRD
- Spouse: Helene Elisabeth Ritschard
- Parent: Dr. Emil August Lohner (1840–1927)
- Relatives: Carl Friedrich Ludwig Lohner (1786-1863) (great grandfather)

Emil Lohner (15 April 1865 – 24 February 1959) was a Swiss politician (FDP / PRD) initially on a cantonal level and later nationally.

== Biography ==
=== Provenance and early years ===
Karl Emil Lohner was born in Thun, a small town with a well-diversified economy in central Switzerland. Emil August Lohner (1840–1927), his father, worked as a physician. His great grandfather, Carl Friedrich Ludwig Lohner (1786-1863), had been a member of the Cantonal Executive Council of Bern, serving in 1835 as cantonal Landammann (head of government), also notable as a coin collector. The Lohner family was well-connected within and beyond the Canton of Bern, and moderately prosperous.

In 1883 Lohner successfully completed his schooling at Burgdorf and moved on to the University of Bern in order to obtain a degree in Jurisprudence in preparation for work as a lawyer.

Following qualification he worked briefly as a junior lawyer in Thun at the legal firm of Johannes Ritschard, his father-in-law, during 1889/1890. He then set up and for a year ran his own legal practice at Aarberg, a little town on the far side of Bern, before returning to Thun, where he ran his legal firm between 1891 and 1909.

=== Municipal politics ===
Political engagement was a well-established tradition within the large and, within the canton, influential Lohner family. By marrying Helene Elisabeth Ritschard, Lohner formed a personal connection to another political family. Johannes Ritschard (1845–1908), his wife’s father, who had also trained and worked as a lawyer, had switched the focus of his career increasingly to politics, both cantonal and national, during the 1870s, and was for many years a Member of Switzerland’s national parliament. During the 1890s Emil Lohner also found time to become increasingly involved in politics. Like his father-in-law, he was drawn to the grouping that was relaunched in 1894 as the “Free Democratic Party” (FDP / “Freisinnig-Demokratische Partei”). He was elected a member of the Thun municipal council in 1897: two years later, in 1899 he was elected “Gemeindepräsident” (‘’loosely, “local mayor”’’), serving in this capacity till 1909. During this period he hit the headlines in the context of the bitter strike and resulting brief shut-down at the Selve steel works, triggered in 1905 by workers’ demands for better working conditions and higher wages. Lohner’s attempts at mayoral mediation between the parties appeared to have little immediate effect, but in due course the parties settled their differences and the German absentee factory owner was able to agree to much of what had been demanded.

=== Cantonal politics ===
Between 1898 and 1909 Lohner sat as a member of the Cantonal Parliament for Bern.

The death of Johannes Ritschard in October 1908 made necessary a bye-election for the seat on the Bern Executive Council. The election took place on 31 January 1908, and Emil Lohner was elected to fill the vacancy created by the death of his late father-in-law. Within the executive council, he took over the Education portfolio which Ritschard had formerly held. However, there was evidently no appetite among fellow council members for a more extensive shake-up, and other departmental responsibilities remained unaffected by the change. He remained a member of the cantonal executive council between 1909 and 1928, responsible for Education for ten years, and thereafter responsible for Justice, Military Affairs and civil security. At the education directorate, from 1909 till 1918, he backed the reintroduction of the Matura (school final exams) and oversaw substantial salary increases for primary school teachers. At the justice directorate, between 1918 and 1928, his achievements included the simplification of district administration within the justice system, the introduction of a new Penal Process Code and a new Youth Justice system. Then as now, it was customary for the Executive Council to operate on a relatively consensual basis, and for the presidency of it to rotate between council members on an annual basis. Accordingly, between 1 June 1912 and 31 May 1913, and again between 1 June 1923 and 31 May 1924, Emil Lohner served as President of the Executive Council – in effect head of the cantonal government.

=== National politics ===
Between 1914 and 1918 Emil Lohner served as FDP (party) president on a national basis, which presumably would have been an appropriate launching pad for a possible move into national government. He had already been sitting as a member of the ”Nationalrat” (‘’national parliament’’), representing one of the Bern electoral districts, since October 1902.

In December 1919 Emil Lohner was a candidate for a vacancy that had arisen, following the death of Eduard Müller, in the “Bundesrat” (‘’federal council’’), the seven man executive committee heading up the Swiss government in respect of business that cannot be dealt with at a cantonal level. However, he was beaten into second place by his party comrade Karl Scheurer, another lawyer turned politician. The margin of Lohner’s electoral defeat was large. He received just 20 votes from an electorate consisting of his parliamentary colleagues: Scheurer received 155. Lohner nevertheless remained a Member of the national Parliament till the end of 1927, and remained an influential member of the leadership team within the FDP. As a parliamentarian he was a consistent advocate for the continuing development of the railway network in and around Bern, and for the further modernisation (which at the time was virtually synonymous with electrification) of the rail network across Switzerland.

=== Business interests ===
Lohner served as a director of at least two railways companies during the 1920s, and he was the chairman of the executive board at the Bern–Lötschberg–Simplon railway between 1923 and 1927. The company owned and operated a strategically vital transport link between Switzerland’s commercial and industrial heartland and Northern Italy. Relatively profitable, it was frequently identified as the largest of Switzerland’s private railway companies. It was of critical importance to the local economy of Thun and the surrounding region.

He was also a director, and according to at least one source chairman, of Schweizerische Mobiliar, a major insurance company based in Bern.

=== Bridge building ===
Between 1914 and 1918 the Swiss government, pursuing a strategy of armed neutrality, managed to avoid military engagement in the First World War, despite being surrounded by belligerent powers and a constant concern that the fighting might spill over the frontier. On the home front, sympathies tended to diverge according to longstanding cultural and linguistic differences. In German-speaking central and northern Switzerland, there was a preponderance of support for the German and Austrian cause, while in the French speaking west of Switzerland there was more support for France, and the liberal and democratic traditions with which it had been associated since the French Revolution in 1789. Separatist tensions grew, and were reflected in internal divisions within the FDP (party) of which, by 1919, Lohner had become a leading member. At this difficult time, he won plaudits for his central role in restoring unity to the party, clearing up tensions and mediating in disagreements between the French speaking and German speaking tribalists within the party leadership.

In the aftermath of the war Lohner distinguished himself in the field of foreign affairs as member of the Swiss League of Nations commission. Between 1922 and 1924 he represented Switzerland in the Disarmament Commission. Then, in 1925, he represented his country at the Geneva Arms Trade Conference at which the important Geneva Protocol on wartime deployments of "asphyxiating, poisonous or other gases, and bacteriological methods of warfare", was agreed between the participating nations.

=== After parliament ===
Emil Lohner was 62 when he resigned his membership of the national parliament at the end of 1927. In 1928 the Bundesrat appointed him to head up the Central Office for International Rail Transport. He served the organisation as its Managing Director between 1928 and 1935.

He was a few months short of his ninety-fourth birthday when he died in his home town early during 1959.
