= Thomas Knutti =

Swiss politician (born 1973)

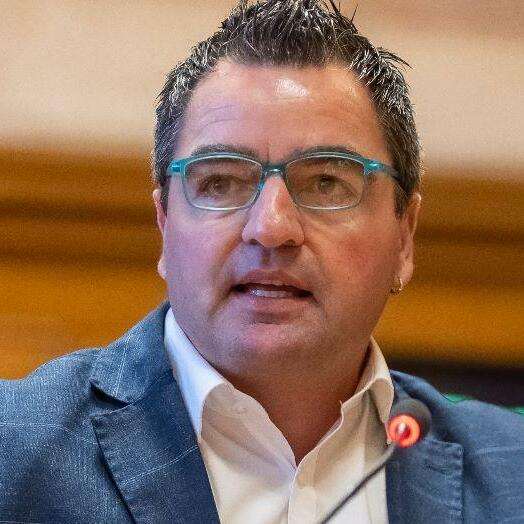
- Knutti in December 2023

Member of the National Council (Switzerland)
- Incumbent
- Assumed office 4 December 2023
- Constituency: Canton of Bern

Member of the Grand Council of Bern
- In office 1 June 2010 – 31 December 2023
- Succeeded by: Nils Fiechter

Personal details
- Born: Thomas Knutti; 15 March 1973 (age 53)
- Party: Swiss People's Party
- Occupation: Businessman, politician
- Website: Official website Parliament website

Military service
- Allegiance: Switzerland
- Branch/service: Swiss Armed Forces
- Rank: Soldier

Thomas Knutti (German pronunciation: [ˈtoːmas ˈknʊti]; born 15 March 1973) is a Swiss businessman and politician who has served on the National Council (Switzerland) since 2023 for the Swiss People's Party. He previously served on the Grand Council of Berne where, he was succeeded by Nils Fiechter.
