= Evi Allemann =

Swiss politician

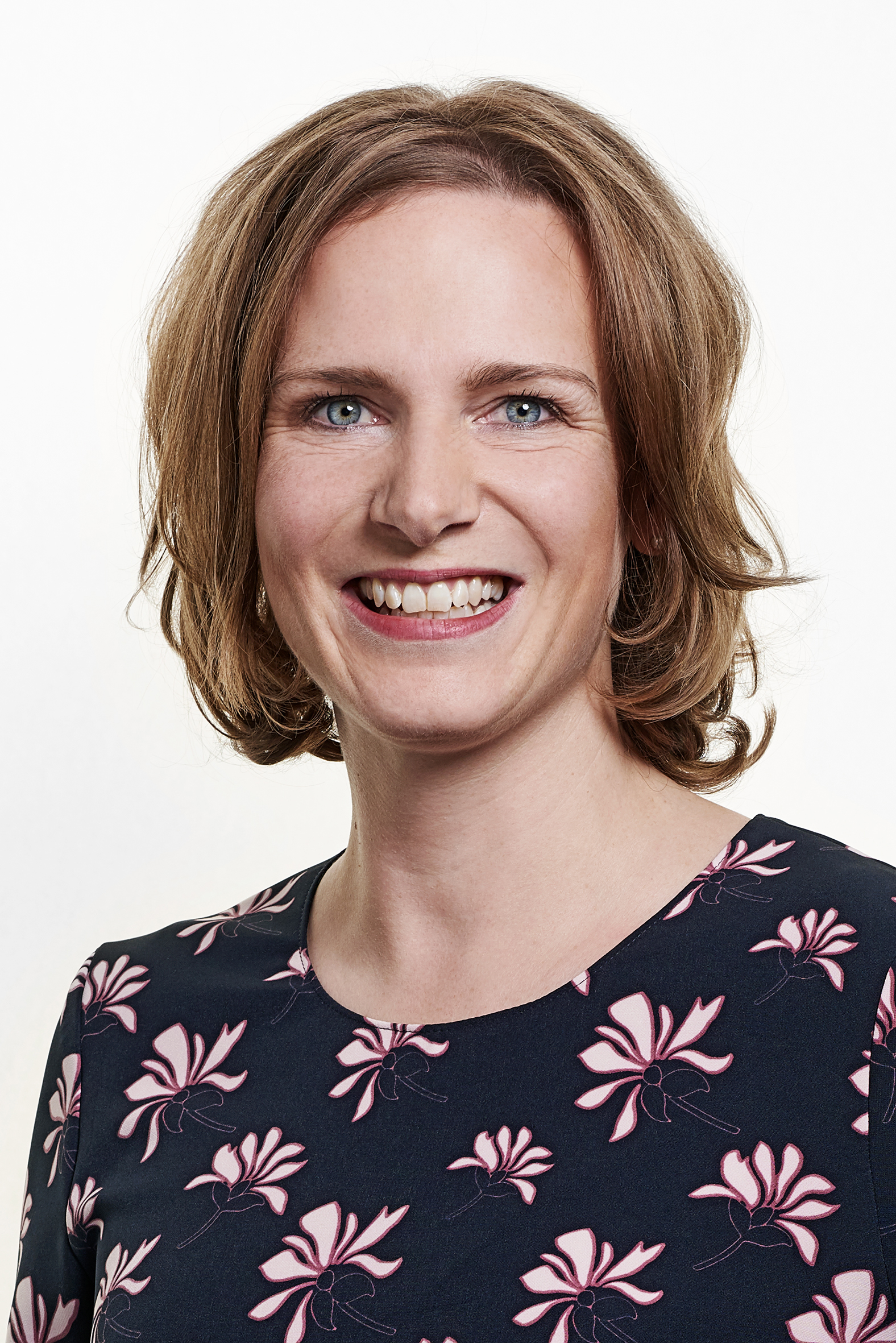
- Official portrait, 2017

Member of Executive Council of Bern
- Incumbent
- Assumed office 1 June 2018

Member of National Council (Switzerland)
- In office 1 December 2003 – 28 May 2018
- Succeeded by: Flavia Wasserfallen

Deputy to the Grand Council of Bern
- In office 1 June 1998 – 4 November 2003

Personal details
- Born: Eva Andrea Allemann; 16 July 1978 (age 47) Bern, Switzerland
- Party: Social Democratic Party of Switzerland
- Children: 2
- Occupation: Attorney, politician
- Website: Executive Council website

Eva Andrea Allemann abbreviated as Evi Allemann (/ˈæləmən/; born 16 July 1978) is a Swiss politician who currently serves as member of the Executive Council of Bern for the Social Democratic Party since 2018. She previously served on the National Council (Switzerland) between 2003 and 2018.

In October 2023, she announced candidacy in the 2023 Swiss federal election, to succeed Alain Berset in the Federal Council (Switzerland).

In 2024, she was elected president of the Executive Council of Bern.

== Career ==
In April 1998, Allemann was elected to the Grand Council of Bern and was the youngest female member ever elected in a Swiss Cantonal Council. As a member of the Justice Committee, she mainly focused on schooling and youth policy.

In 2003, she was elected to the National Council with 56,118 votes after she led a campaign alongside her Young Socialists running mates Mirjam Minder, Patric Bhend and Nasha Gagnebin. At the age of 25, she became the youngest member of the 47th Swiss Parliament. She first sat in the Legal Affairs Committees, then in the Transports and Telecommunications Committees and then in the Security Policy Committees.

Even though her party lost votes at the 2007 federal election, Allemann was re-elected with 85,332 votes. She continued seating in the Transports and Telecommunications Committees and the Security Policy Committee.

Allemann lives in Bern and works as a lawyer.

She was elected as the chairwoman of the VCS Verkehrs-Club der Schweiz on 20 April 2013.

On 25 March 2018 she was elected to the Executive Council of Bern with 99,902 votes and took the direction of Justice, Communal Affairs and Church Affairs.

== See also ==
- List of members of the National Council of Switzerland, 2003–07
- List of members of the National Council of Switzerland, 2007–11
- List of members of the National Council of Switzerland, 2011–15
- List of members of the Federal Assembly from the Canton of Bern
