= Bhend =

Bhend is a surname occurring mainly in the German-speaking part of Switzerland. Notable people with the surname include:

- Edwin Bhend (1931–2025), Swiss chess player and author
- Eveline Bhend (born 1981), Swiss freestyle skier
- Käthi Bhend (born 1942), Swiss graphic designer and illustrator
- Samuel Bhend (1943–2021), Swiss politician
