= Young Liberals =

Young Liberals may refer to:

- Young Liberals (Australia)
- Young Liberals Austria
- Young Liberals of Canada
- Young Liberals (Germany)
- Young Liberals of Norway
- Young Liberals (Switzerland)
- Young Liberals (UK), the youth and student organisation of the UK Liberal Democrats
  - English Young Liberals
  - Scottish Young Liberals
  - Welsh Young Liberals
- National League of Young Liberals, the 1903–1990 youth wing of the British Liberal Party
- British Columbia Young Liberals, the youth wing of the British Columbia Liberal Party
