= Samuel Bhend =

Swiss politician (1943–2021)

Member of the Executive Council of Bern
- In office 1 May 1997 – 30 May 2006
- Preceded by: Hermann Fehr
- Succeeded by: Philippe Perrenoud

Member of the Grand Council of Bern
- In office 1990–1997
- In office 1974–1986

Personal details
- Born: 1943 Brienz, Switzerland
- Died: 2 December 2021 (aged 77–78)
- Party: PS

Samuel Bhend (1943 – 2 December 2021) was a Swiss politician.

== Biography ==
Bhend was born in Brienz in 1943 and grew up in Beatenberg. After graduating from secondary school, he became a teacher and subsequently a principal in Urtenen-Schönbühl. He was married to Lotti Bhend-Reber. Samuel Bhend died on 2 December 2021 at the age of 78.

== Political career ==
Bhend was a member of the Social Democratic Party of Switzerland (PS) and was part of the ecological faction of the party. He was a communal councilor in Urtenen-Schönbühl from 1976 to 1982. He served in the Grand Council of Bern from 1974 to 1986 and again from 1990 to 1997. He was praised as an opposition figure by Le Temps and Le Nouveau Quotidien. He served as Vice-President of the inquiry on the issue of Jura separatism in the mid-1980s. He chaired the PS in the Bernese Oberland from 1985 to 1992. He ran for a seat in the Federal Assembly three times, without success.

Bhend was elected to the Executive Council of Bern in 1997, taking over the seat of Hermann Fehr, who had resigned due to health complications. He became head of the Public Health and Welfare Department on 1 May 1997. He was re-elected in 1998 and 2002. In 2005, he announced that he would not be running for a fourth term.
