= Gottlieb Riem =

Swiss merchant and politician (1825–1888)

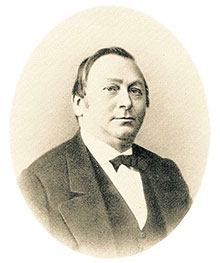
- Official portrait, 1867

Member of the National Council (Switzerland)
- In office 1 July 1867 – 3 November 1888 (his death)
- Constituency: Canton of Bern

Member of the Grand Council of Bern
- In office 1862–1866

Personal details
- Born: 29 July 1825 Wichtrach, Switzerland
- Died: 3 November 1888 (aged 63) Kiesen, Switzerland
- Spouse: Magdalena Leuenberger (m. 1849)
- Relations: Katja Riem (4x great-granddaughter)
- Children: 2
- Occupation: Businessman, wine merchant, farmer, politician

Gottlieb Riem (29 July 1825 – 3 November 1888) was a Swiss merchant and politician who most notably served on the National Council (Switzerland) from 1867 to 1888 (his death) for the Free Radical Liberals. He previously served on the Grand Council of Bern (1862–66) and as municipal president of Kiesen. Riem is the 4x great-grandfather of Katja Riem, incumbent member of the National Council since 2023.

In 1868, Riem partnered with Johann Gottfried Daepp (1847–1890), his nephew, and formed one of the first Bernese wine merchant firms (presently known as Riem, Daepp & Co.). He purchased wineries and fully transitioned to the wine business. His company is currently led by the 5th, respectively 6th generation.
