= Abraham Stocker =

Swiss politician

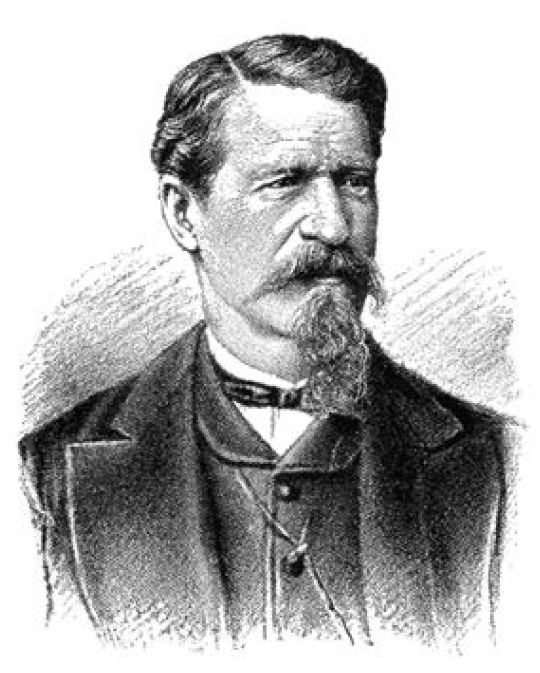
Abraham Stocker

Abraham Stocker (26 December 1825 in Büron – 6 October 1887) was a Swiss politician, mayor of Lucerne (1865/1866) and President of the Swiss Council of States (1870).

Preceded by Johann Weber	President of the Council of States; 1870	Succeeded by Augustin Keller
