= Marc Jost =

Swiss politician (born 1974)

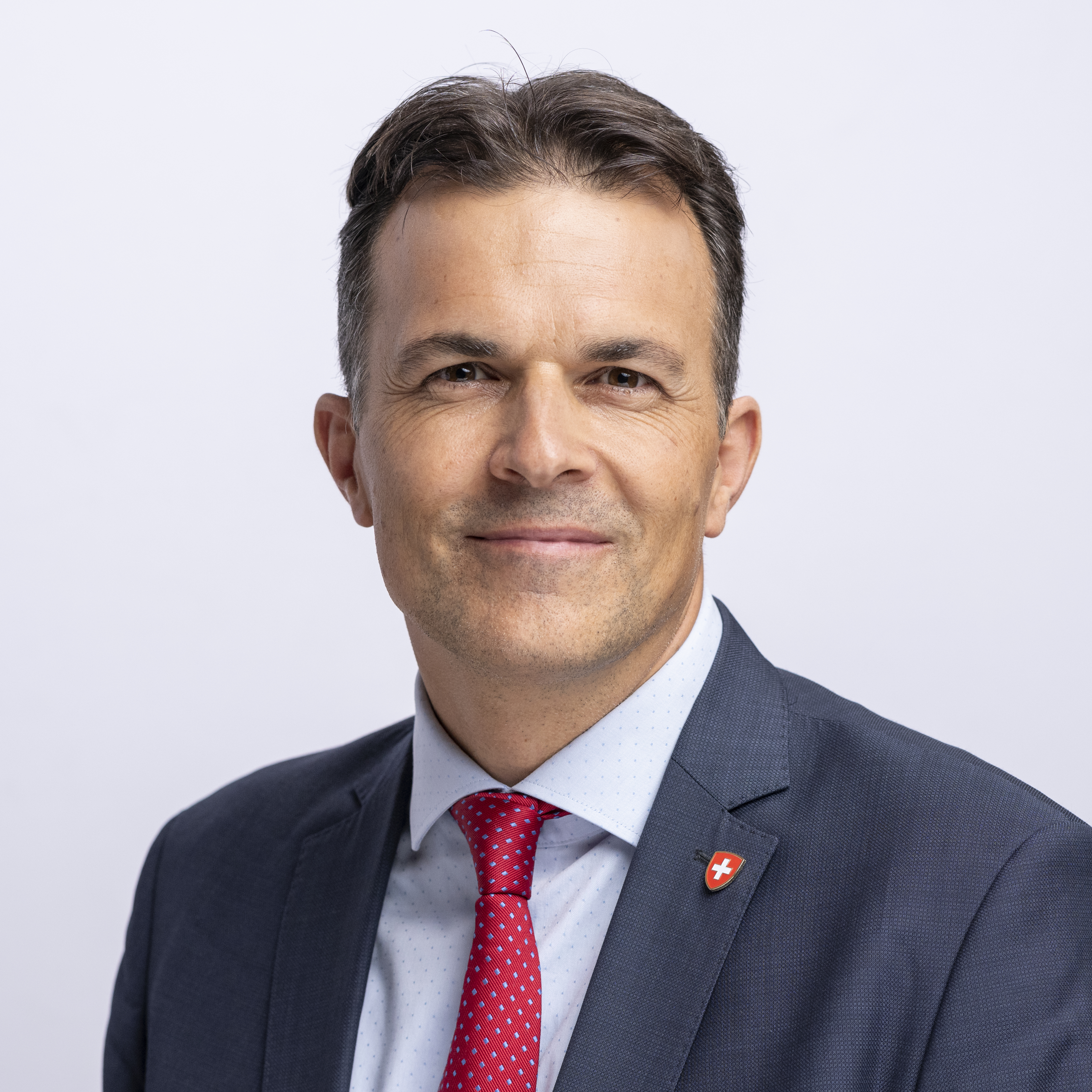
- Official portrait, 2023

Member of National Council (Switzerland)
- Incumbent
- Assumed office 28 November 2022
- Preceded by: Marianne Streiff-Feller
- Constituency: Canton of Bern

Member of Grand Council of Bern
- In office 2006–2020

Personal details
- Born: Marc Jost; 6 February 1974 (age 52) Thun, Switzerland
- Party: Evangelical People's Party
- Children: 4
- Occupation: Pastor, theologist, politician
- Website: Official website Parliament website

Marc Jost (born 6 February 1974) is a Swiss pastor, theologist and politician who currently serves on the National Council (Switzerland) for the Evangelical People's Party since 2022. He previously served on the Grand Council of Bern from 2006 to 2020, during 2015/16 as its president.
