= Municipal clerk =

Municipal government office

A clerk (pronounced "clark" /klɑːk/ in British and Australian English) is a senior official of many municipal governments in the English-speaking world. In some communities, including most in the United States, the position is elected, but in many others, the clerk is appointed to their post. In the UK, a town or parish clerk is appointed by the town or parish council members. In almost all cases, the actual title of the clerk reflects the type of municipality they work for; thus, instead of simply being known as the clerk, the position is generally referred to as the town clerk, township clerk, city clerk, village clerk, borough clerk, board secretary, or county clerk. Other titles also exist, such as recorder, corporate officer, and, especially in the United Kingdom, chief executive. The office has existed for centuries, though in some places it is now being merged with other positions.

The duties of a municipal clerk vary even more than their titles. In the United Kingdom, a clerk is generally responsible for a local council (town or parish). Particularly in the United States, it is difficult to fully describe a clerk's duties, because there are hundreds of different jobs a clerk may fulfill. In some U.S. states, there are provisions in the state constitutions delineating the clerk's duties, but in other states, each municipality decides for itself what role the clerk plays.

== History ==
The origins of the position of clerk are unclear. In ancient Greece there were secretaries for each polis who read official documents publicly and at the opening of a meeting read public curses. The early keepers of the archives were often called remembrancers, and before writing came into use, their memory was public record. When the early colonists came to America, one of the first offices established was that of clerk. The colony at Plymouth appointed a person to act as a recorder.

== Australia ==
In New South Wales, for over a century, the chief administrative officer of a city or borough was also legally designated the town clerk. This continued until 1993, when the NSW Local Government Act 1993 was passed and the officer became called the 'general manager of the local council/shire'.

== Canada ==
All Canadian local governments will have a position in their organization responsible for the duties of the clerk, working closely with other statutory positions, including the chief administrative officer and chief financial officer. Clerks are not elected in Canada, and are apolitical. This is an important measure, considering many Canadian clerks are tasked with the duty of administering local elections.

Provincial legislation lays out the key duties of the clerk, and can vary from province to province, but often includes the following:

- ensuring the accurate taking of council minutes/recording of the decisions of council;
- ensuring the public is provided with access to local government records;
- certifying copies of bylaws and resolutions of council;
- administering oaths and affidavits; and
- keeping of the corporate seal.

Many clerks also act as a government's Freedom of Information (FOI) head for the purposes of FOI requests.

In Ontario, the clerk issues marriage licences and burial permits, and registers deaths on behalf of the provincial government. They also are authorized to perform civil weddings.

Title of the clerk may vary from local government to local government. In British Columbia, the clerk is often referred to as the corporate officer of the municipal government, as established in that province's community charter legislation.

== New Zealand ==
In New Zealand, for over a century, the chief administrative officer of a city or borough was also legally designated the town clerk. This continued until the 1970s, when the city and county administrative procedures were largely merged and the Local Government Act 1974 declared that every such person (along with their rural counterpart, the county clerk) should henceforth be styled the chief administrative officer.

The Local Government Act 2002 changed the title again, this time to chief executive.

== United Kingdom ==
In the United Kingdom, the town clerk is the senior administrative officer of the city, borough or town, usually the most senior salaried employee of the council. In most unitary authorities the town clerk has now been renamed the chief executive, although the original name is retained in most smaller towns. The town clerks of the larger county boroughs frequently received knighthoods, and the chief executives of large authorities sometimes still do. The equivalent officer in counties and districts was the clerk to the council (now also designated chief executive) and in (non-town) parishes is the parish clerk, usually part-time, but still a paid official, whose main responsibility is the administration and minuting of parish council meetings and parish council finance. The Town Clerk of London is an important executive position with a staff and significant budget.

On ceremonial occasions, some town clerks will wear a gown of black silk ottoman/grosgrain of the lay pattern with panel sleeves and a flap collar. The gown is trimmed with rows of braid and tassels. This gown is similar to the gown of undergraduate fellow and gentleman-commoners in the ancient universities of Oxford and Cambridge. The town clerk may also wear a wig similar to that of barristers. However, many town clerks will not wear ceremonial dress as the role has been modernised in many towns across the United Kingdom.

The professional body for town clerks in the United Kingdom is the Society of Local Council Clerks, who represent over 5000 clerks across the country.

== United States ==
In the United States, the clerk often serves as the official keeper of the municipal records, and as such, is sometimes described as the "historian" of the community. Sometimes the clerk's office includes presenting the agenda and minutes for the legislative and committee meetings. Official meetings of municipalities can become a serious chore as the activity in the town increases with a larger population. The task of assembling the agenda packets with supporting documents can take several days for a single meeting. It becomes more complicated due to the input and iterative modification by numerous departments and agencies, both within and external to the organization. Software applications that can easily assemble agendas, minutes, and even automatically transcribe the meetings are now becoming more common. Often, these agendas and meeting minutes are downloadable by interested citizens by accessing the organization's website.

Clerks may also be responsible for issuing licenses, overseeing local elections, maintaining financial records, serving as registrar of vital statistics, and increasingly, for assuring the transparency of the municipality's conduct of business.

=== California ===
In California, the city or county clerk is the local official who administers democratic processes such as elections, access to city records, and all legislative actions ensuring transparency to the public. The city clerk acts as a compliance officer for federal, state, and local statutes including the Political Reform Act, the Brown Act, and the Public Records Act. The city clerk manages public inquiries and relationships and arranges for ceremonial and official functions.

=== Connecticut ===
In Connecticut, every town elects or appoints a town clerk to maintain municipal records, administer elections, and carry out other administrative duties as defined by state law or the town charter. In addition, because 19 of Connecticut's 20 cities are consolidated city-towns, several cities either employ separate town and city clerks, or have consolidated the roles into a single office carrying both titles. Every borough also employs a borough clerk, and the Borough of Naugatuck, the state's sole consolidated borough-town, employs a separate borough clerk and town clerk.

=== Illinois ===
In Illinois, clerks may also exist on the township level, which is a subdivision of the county. Such clerks are sometimes required to serve more than one governmental unit, due to the often overlapping jurisdictions that exist in Illinois.

=== Massachusetts ===
In Massachusetts, the town clerk is the chief election official of a town and the keeper of permanent and vital records. The duties of town clerks vary slightly in each community. Massachusetts clerks who have been in office five or more years may be elected by special ballot initiative to a lifetime term with mandatory retirement at age 70, after which they may remain in office if they run for successive terms.

=== New Jersey ===
In New Jersey, as provided for in the Constitution of New Jersey (1947), there are three elected constitutional officers in each county: the sheriff, the surrogate, and the county clerk, the last of whose term is five years. The county clerk is responsible the supervision of elections, the filing and recording of all documents in real estate ownership/transfer, the processing passport applications, assisting individuals who wish to become a notary public, the issuance of identification cards, the filing of business trade names, among other administrative duties.

=== New York ===
New York state law provides for elected town and county clerks who have separately defined responsibilities. (Under Article XIII, §13(a) of the New York Constitution, the county clerks within New York City are not elected, but instead "shall be appointed, and be subject to removal, by the appellate division of the supreme court in the judicial department in which the county is located.") For example, marriage licenses and dog licenses are issued by town clerks while business certificates and real property deeds are maintained by county clerks. Appointed historians are also required at each level. City clerks may administer elections but, outside cities, county election commissioners head the election apparatus.

=== West Virginia ===
The West Virginia Code provides for an elected recorder in Class IV towns (those with fewer than 2,000 people) and in some larger municipalities. By default, recorders act as mayor pro tem of the municipal government in the absence of the actual mayor. Recorders also serve as members of and secretary to the city or town council, as well as recorder of deeds, archivist, and municipal supervisor of elections. In some smaller towns' governments, recorders additionally fill the role of financial officer. Many municipalities delegate some or all of these duties to an employee with the title of city or town clerk, while others may divide them between the recorder and the clerk. The recorder or clerk may even have authority by ordinance to issue warrants for arrest, although this power normally resides in a municipal judge.

== Switzerland ==
In Switzerland, the communal secretary, either alone or with subordinate clerks, performs all administrative work that does not require the powers of the elected municipal council.

== See also ==
- Recorder of deeds
