= Ursula Zybach =

Swiss politician (born 1967)

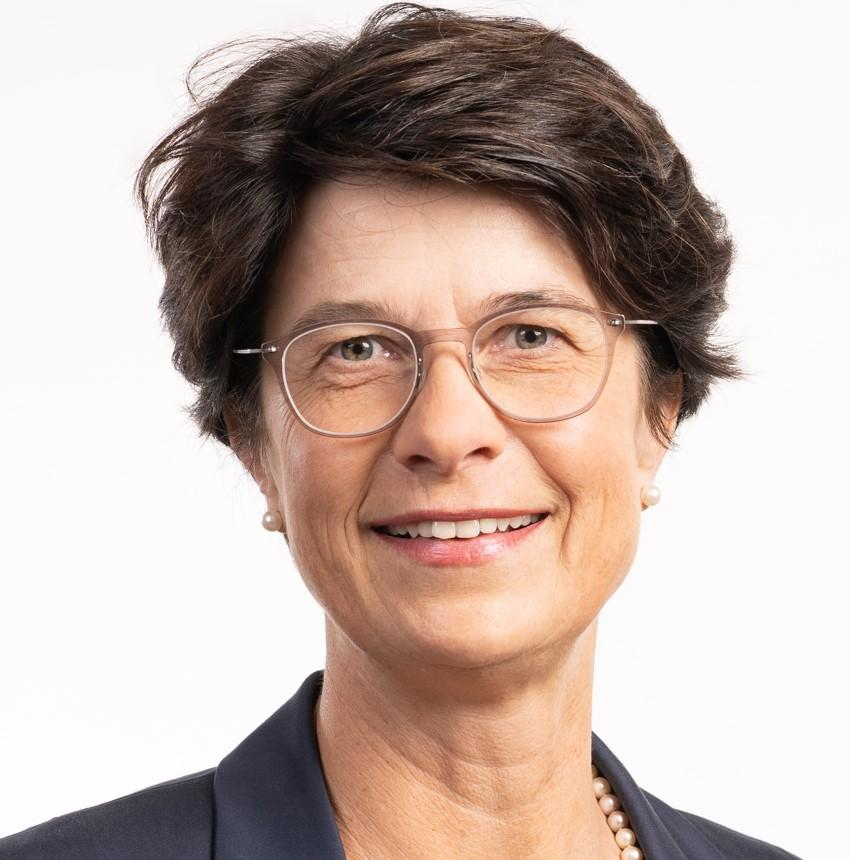
- Official portrait, 2023

Member of the National Council (Switzerland)
- Incumbent
- Assumed office 4 December 2023
- Constituency: Canton of Bern

Member of the Grand Council of Bern
- Incumbent
- Assumed office 1 June 2014

Personal details
- Born: Ursula Therese Zybach; 29 August 1967 (age 59)
- Spouse: Andreas Pfirter (m. 2000)
- Occupation: Food engineer, nonprofit executive, politician
- Website: Official website Parliament website

Ursula Therese Zybach Pfirter colloquially Ursula Zybach (German pronunciation: [ˈʊʁ.zu.la ˈtsi.bax]; born 29 August 1967) is a Swiss food engineer and politician currently serving on the National Council (Switzerland) for the Social Democratic Party since 2023. She currently serves on the Finance commission. Zybach also serves as member of the Grand Council of Bern since 2014.
