= Executive Council of Bern =

Executive body of the Swiss canton of Bern

The Executive Council (German: Regierungsrat, French: Conseil-éxecutif) is the executive of the Swiss canton of Bern.

This seven-member collegial body is elected by the people for a period of four years. The cantonal constitution reserves one seat in the Executive Council for a French-speaking citizen from the Bernese Jura. The presidency, by convention, rotates annually and the position is largely that of a primus inter pares.

== Current composition ==
As of 2025, the Executive Council was composed as follows:

- President of the Council Christoph Neuhaus, SVP/UDC: Director of Public Works and Transport
- Vice President of the Council Christoph Ammann, SP/PS: Director of Economic Affairs, Energy and the Environment
- Executive Councillor Evi Allemann, SP/PS: Director of Home Affairs and Justice
- Executive Councillor Astrid Bärtschi, The Centre: Director of Finance
- Executive Councillor Christine Häsler, GPS/PES: Director of Education and Culture
- Executive Councillor Philippe Müller, FDP/PLR: Director of Security
- Executive Councillor Pierre Alain Schnegg, SVP/UDC: Director of Health, Social Affairs and Integration
- State Chancellor Christoph Auer: State Chancellory (chief of staff with no vote in the Council)

== 2006 Executive Council elections ==
The 2006 Executive Council elections occurred on April 9. While Councillors Egger, Gasche and Luginbühl ran for re-election (which they achieved easily), Councillors Andres, Annoni, Bhend and Zölch resigned, leaving the field unusually wide open.

The SVP, long the dominant party in Bern, unexpectedly made an attempt to seize control of the Council by fielding four candidates instead of the usual three. The parties left of center criticised this move as contrary to the tradition of concordance government. Despite the majority voting procedure and its alliance with the FDP, the SVP failed to attain its goal, losing one seat to the Social Democrats instead. As the FDP also lost one seat to the Greens, the governmental majority changed to the Left.

Together with the FDP, the parties right of center (usually referred to in Bern as bürgerlich, i.e., bourgeois) had slated six candidates:

- Urs Gasche, SVP (re-elected)
- Werner Luginbühl, SVP (re-elected)
- Hans-Jürg Käser, FDP (elected)
- Monique Jametti Greiner, SVP (not elected)
- Annelise Vaucher, SVP (for the Bernese Jura seat, not elected)
- Eva Desarzens, FDP (not elected)

The parties left of center, in turn, had agreed on a slate of four candidates:

- Barbara Egger-Jenzer, SP (re-elected)
- Philippe Perrenoud, SP (for the Bernese Jura seat, elected)
- Andreas Rickenbacher, SP (elected)
- Bernhard Pulver, GFL (elected)

The other candidates, fielded by minor parties or groups (different Christian parties, nationalists, French-speaking quasi-separatists, joke parties) were never considered to have a substantial chance of winning a Council seat.

Source: Official 2006 elections website

== 2010 Executive Council elections ==
The 2010 election on March 28 was the first without pre-printed block lists. Given this and the rather surprising left-wing win in 2006, it was widely questioned whether the Social Democrats and the Greens could hold their majority.

Urs Gasche, who had switched to the newly founded Conservative Democratic Party, did not run for re-election. His party defended their seat with Beatrice Simon. The SVP sought to regain two seats with re-elected Christoph Neuhaus and first-time candidate Albert Rösti, who scored eighth and was therefore not elected.

For the FDP, Hans-Jürg Käser successfully ran for re-election, while Sylvain Astier, who contested the Jura seat, lost to Philippe Perrenoud.

On the left, Barbara Egger-Jenzer, Andreas Rickenbacher, Philippe Perrenoud (all Social Democrats) and Bernhard Pulver (Greens) were re-elected, retaining the left-wing's control over the executive. Except for Philippe Perrenoud, who defended the Jura seat, they scored the best results.

Several candidates of minor parties, including Jurassian separatist Maxime Zuber (Parti Socialiste Autonome) and Marc Jost (EVP) were unsuccessful.

== See also ==
- The city of Bern also has an executive council, the Gemeinderat, as its government.
- The operation and customs of the Executive Council are very similar to that of the Swiss Federal Council, the national government.
