= Franz Kurzmeyer =

Swiss judge and politician (1935–2024)

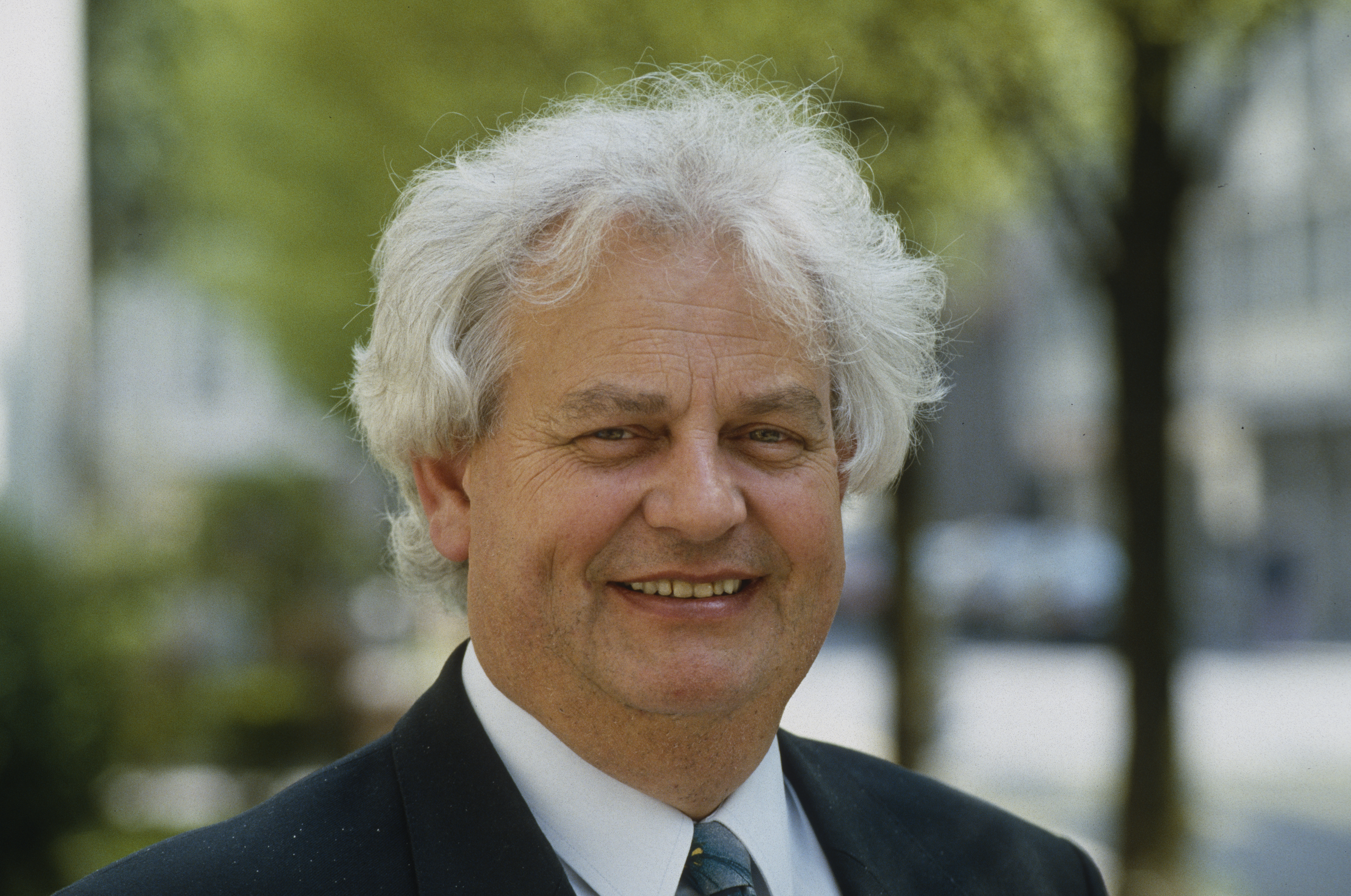
- Kurzmeyer in 1991

Mayor of Lucerne
- In office 1984–1996
- Preceded by: Matthias Luchsinger
- Succeeded by: Urs W. Studer

Member of the Grand Council of Lucerne
- In office 1971–1976

Personal details
- Born: 29 August 1935 Lucerne, Switzerland
- Died: 10 January 2024 (aged 88) Lucerne, Switzerland
- Party: FDP
- Education: University of Zurich
- Occupation: Judge

Franz Kurzmeyer (29 August 1935 – 10 January 2024) was a Swiss judge and politician. A member of the Free Democratic Party, he served as mayor of Lucerne from 1984 to 1996.

Kurzmeyer died in Lucerne on 10 January 2024, at the age of 88.
