= Eugène Richard =

Swiss politician

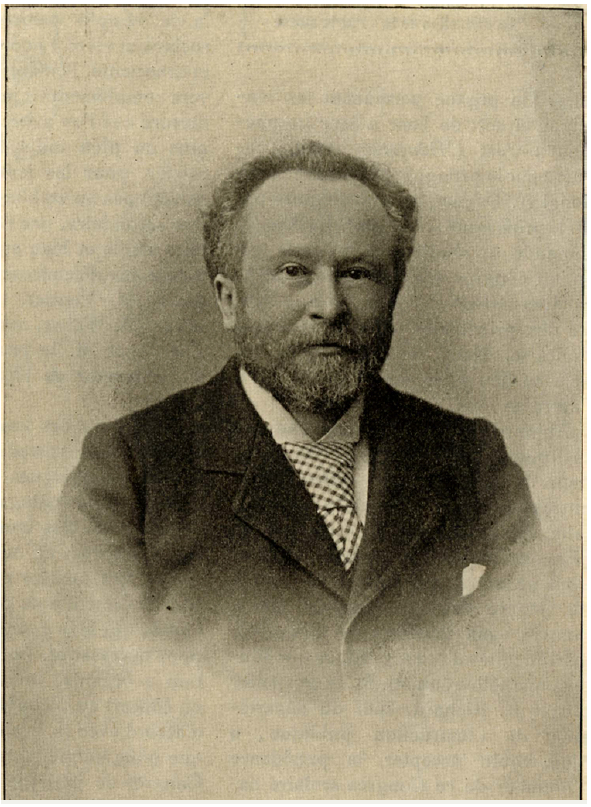
undated photo of Richard, from the collections of the Bibliothèque de Genève

Marc-Eugène Richard (9 May 1843 – 30 April 1925) was a Swiss politician and President of the Swiss Council of States (1913/1914).

== Brief biography ==
Eugène Richard was born in Geneva. He graduated from his home town in law in 1870. During his early career, he served as a secretary to Mr Jean-Baptiste Pioda, a plenipotentiary minister of the Swiss Confederation to the Italian Court and Mr. Leblanc, a senator in Paris.

In his later years, Richard finished his PhD in Etudes de nationalités (Studies of Nationalities). This was followed by his working as a trainee barrister. He later became a partner in the Castoldi law firm and then went on to become a partner with Mr Léon Guinand in 1873.

A business law professor in 1886, Richard also worked as a member of the Court of cassation from 1917 to 1924. His further careers stats included, a member of parliament in the Genevan Grand Council (1874–1910), Councillor of State (member of Cantonal government)(1889–1900), a Swiss National Councillor (member of lower house parliament)(1890–1893), a Genevan parliamentarian to the Council of the States (Upper house of parliament)(1893–1914) and finally the President of the Swiss Council of States. He belonged to the Liberal Centre, which later developed into the Liberal Party of Switzerland.

Preceded by Gottfried Kunz	President of the Council of States; 1913/1914	Succeeded by Johannes Geel
