= List of mayors of Lucerne =

This is a list of mayors (Stadtpräsident) of Lucerne, Switzerland.

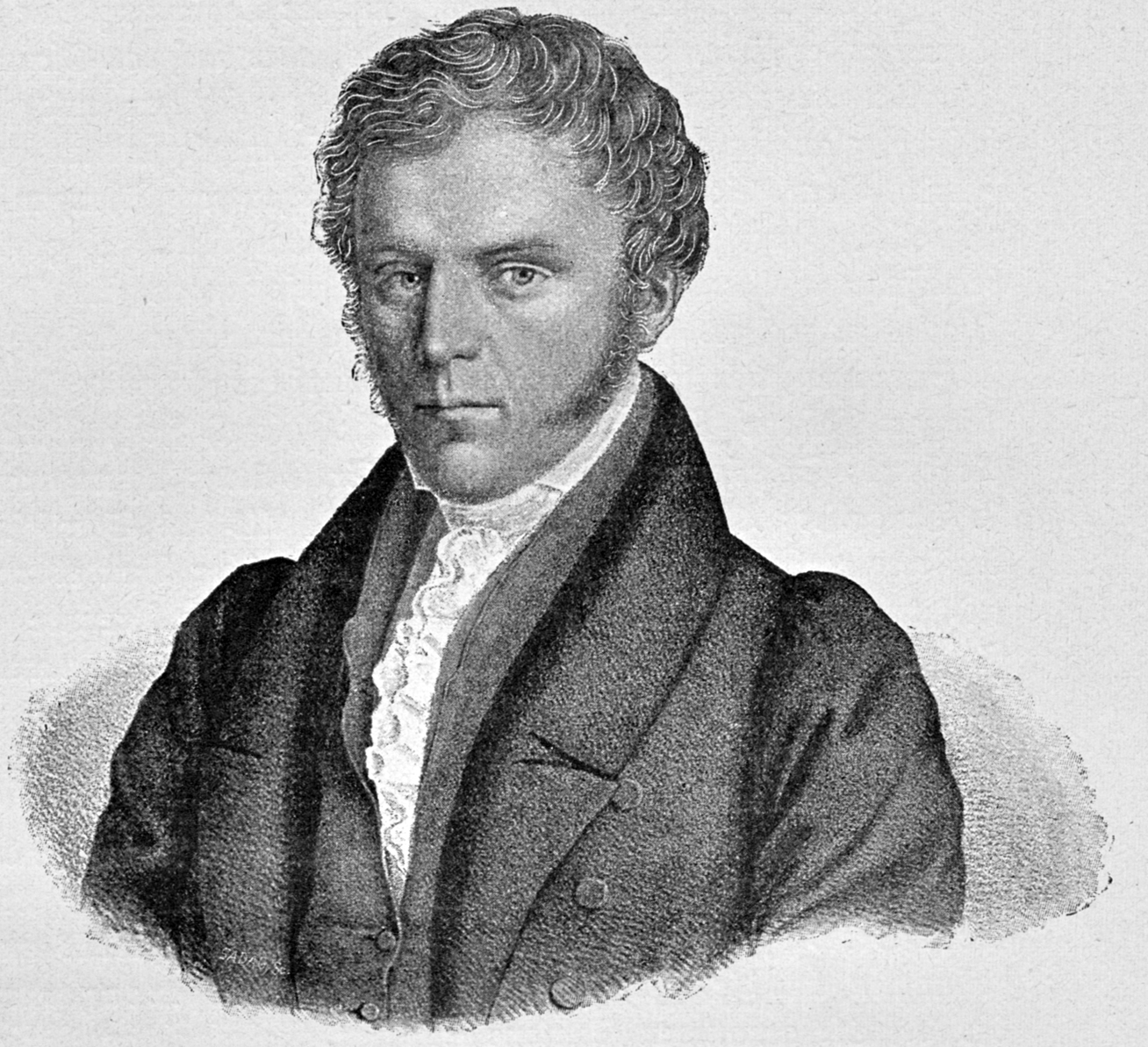
Casimir Pfyffer (1794–1875) was mayor from 1832 to 1835

Logo of the city of Lucerne

Mayor of Lucerne (Stadtpräsident von Luzern)
Term	Mayor	Lifespan	Party	Notes
1832–1835	Casimir Pfyffer	(1794–1875)		
1836–1840	K. Alsinger			
1841	Josef Zünd	(1793–1858)		
1841 (declined)	Josef Mazzola	(1799–1871)		
1841–1845	Alois Hautt	(1806–1871)		
1845–1847	Josef Schumacher	(1793–1860)		
1845–1854	Felix Balthasar	(1794–1854)		
1854–1860	Johann Winkler	(1805–1863)		
1860–1864	Wilhelm Schindler	(1829–1898)		
1864 (declined)	Fr. Bechtold			
1865–1866	Abraham Stocker	(1825–1887)		
1866–1871	Leonz Gurdi	(1814–1891)		
1871–1890	Ludwig Pfyffer	(1822–1893)		
1890–1891	Friedrich Wüest	(1843–1902)		
1891–1916	Hermann Heller	(1850–1917)		
1916–1919	Gustav Schaller	(1866–1945)		
1919–1939	Jakob Zimmerli	(1863–1940)		
1939–1953	Max S. Wey	(1892–1953)		
1953–1967	Paul Kopp	(1900–1984)		
1967–1979	Hans-Rudolf Meyer	(1922–2005)		
1979–1984	Matthias Luchsinger	(1919–1984)	Liberale Partei Luzern, part of FDP/PRD	
1984–1996	Franz Kurzmeyer	(born 1935)	Liberale Partei Luzern, part of FDP/PRD	
1996–2012	Urs W. Studer	(born 1949)	independent, before 1996: FDP/PRD	
2012–2016	Stefan Roth	(born 1960)	CVP/PDC	
2016–present	Beat Züsli	(born 1963)	SP	
