= Johann Weber =

Swiss politician

Johann Weber (19 June 1828 – 23 April 1878) was a Swiss politician and President of the Swiss Council of States (1869/1870). He was born in Seeberg.

Preceded by Eugène Borel	President of the Council of States; 1869/1870	Succeeded by Abraham Stocker
