= Young SVP =

Youth wing of Swiss People's Party

Young SVP Junge SVP Jeunes UDC Giovani UDC
- President: Nils Fiechter
- Vice President: Joel Stutz, Daniel Esfeld
- Founded: 1977
- Headquarters: Postfach 6803; 3001 Bern
- Ideology: National conservatism Euroscepticism
- Mother party: Swiss People's Party
- International affiliation: International Young Democrat Union
- European affiliation: European Young Conservatives
- Website: www.jsvp.ch

The Young SVP (German: Junge SVP, French: Jeunes UDC, Italian: Giovani UDC) is the youth wing of the Swiss People's Party (SVP/UDC).

Founded in 1977 as a part of the SVP's Zurich branch, the Young SVP served as a training ground for many of the SVP's future leaders.

== See also ==
- Junge Tat have links with Young SVP
