= Christian Wasserfallen =

Swiss politician (born 1981)

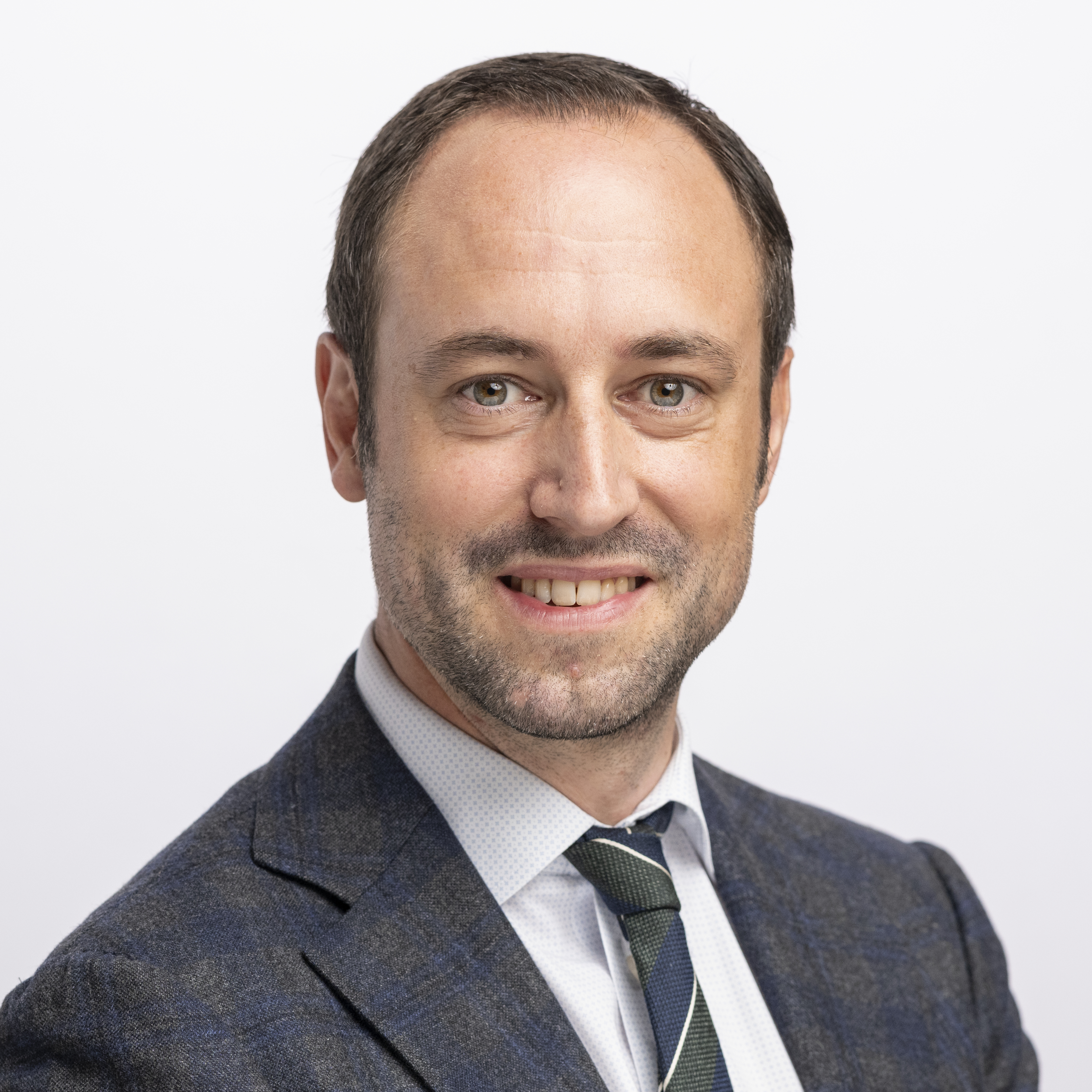
- Official portrait, 2023

Member of the National Council (Switzerland)
- Incumbent
- Assumed office 3 December 2007
- Constituency: Canton of Bern

Vice-chair of The Liberals
- In office 21 April 2012 – 31 December 2019
- President: Philipp Müller; Petra Gössi

Personal details
- Born: Christian Wasserfallen; 30 June 1981 (age 45) Bern, Switzerland
- Party: The Liberals
- Spouse: Alexandra Thalhammer
- Parent: Kurt Wasserfallen (father)
- Education: University of Bern; Bern University of Applied Sciences
- Occupation: Businessman, mechanical engineer, politician
- Website: Official website Parliament website

Christian Wasserfallen (Swiss Standard German: [ˈkrɪsti.a(ː)n ˈvasərˌfalən]; born 30 June 1981) is a Swiss businessman, engineer and politician who currently served on the National Council (Switzerland) for The Liberals since 2007. He concurrently served as vice-chair of The Liberals (Switzerland) from 2012 to 2019. He is likely not related to Flavia Wasserfallen who serves on the Council of States (Switzerland).

== Early life and education ==
Wasserfallen was born 30 June 1981 in Bern, Switzerland, the younger of two sons, to Kurt Wasserfallen (1947–2006), a chemist with a PhD and politician who later also served on the National Council, and Margret Wasserfallen (née Weilenmann; born 1948). His older brother, Peter Wasserfallen (born 1980), served on the city council of Bern, from 2009 to 2012 (initially a member of the Swiss People's Party, he changed his affiliation to independent).

He completed his Matura in 2001 and subsequently studied physics at the University of Bern for two semesters before switching his major to mechanical engineering. In 2007, he graduated from the Bern University of Applied Sciences.

== Political career ==
His political career began in 2000 as a delegate of the Young Liberals. He chaired the Young Liberal Radicals of the City of Bern from 2002 to 2005. In 2003, he was elected to the legislative assembly of the city of Bern.

In 2007 he was elected National Councillor for The Liberals. He was re-elected in the federal elections of 2011, 2015 and 2019. He has been a member of the Committee on the Environment, Spatial Planning and Energy since 2009 and Chairman of the Committee on Science, Education and Culture since 2011, having previously been a member of the Management Committee from 2007 to 2011.

Christian Wasserfallen was one of the five vice-presidents of the Liberal-Radical Party from 2012 to 2019. Although he was approached for a second term as party president in 2015, he finally withdrew at the beginning of 2016. That same year, he stood as a candidate for the presidency of the Swiss Automobile Club: however, his election was contested, complaints were lodged and he eventually relinquished the post. The following year, in 2017, he declared his interest in running for the government of the canton of Bern, but was not selected by his party, which preferred Philippe Müller.

== Personal life ==
He is married to Alexandra Thalhammer, who served on the city council of Bern for The Liberals from 2015 to 2018. They have no children. Wasserfallen holds the rank of officer in the Swiss Armed Forces.

Wasserfallen is an automobile enthusiast owning a Lotus Evora 400. He also served briefly as president of the Automobile Club of Switzerland (ACS).
