= Young Liberals (Switzerland) =

Youth wing of Swiss political party FDP.The Liberals

Young Liberals of Switzerland Jungfreisinnige Schweiz Jeunes Libéraux-Radicaux Suisse Giovani Liberali Radicali Svizzera Giuvens Liberals Svizra
- President: Jonas Lüthy
- Founded: 2008
- Headquarters: Neuengasse 20; 3011 Bern
- Ideology: Classical liberalism
- Mother party: FDP.The Liberals
- International affiliation: International Federation of Liberal Youth (IFLRY)
- European affiliation: European Liberal Youth (LYMEC)
- Website: http://www.jungfreisinnige.ch

The Young Liberals of Switzerland (German: Jungfreisinnige Schweiz, French: Jeunes Libéraux-Radicaux Suisse, Italian: Giovani Liberali Radicali Svizzera, Romansh: Giuvens Liberals Svizra), abbreviated to YLS (German: JF), is the youth wing of FDP.The Liberals. It was founded in 1906, and counts more than 4,400 members aged between 15 and 35 in 25 of the 26 cantons of Switzerland.

== About ==
The Young Liberals of Switzerland (YLS) are active on the federal, the Cantonal, the local level and at universities in Switzerland. The party has four members of the federal National Council, Christian Wasserfallen, Andri Silberschmidt, Philippe Nantermod, Christa Markwalder and one of the Council of States, Johanna Gapany. The party also holds several seats in Cantonal and local parliaments.

Although the YLS is independent, it is affiliated with the Free Democratic Party of Switzerland and, on the international level, with European Liberal Youth.

== Principles ==
The Young Liberals stands for more freedom in daily life and fights against bureaucracy and unnecessary bans. The Young Liberals commit themselves for an excellent education, secure social security within a sustainable social welfare system, a strong economy- based on free market principles -especially for small and medium business, security and a sustainable environment.

== Organisation ==
The sovereign body of the Young Liberals is called "The Congress", and meets once a year, usually in spring. The Congress elects the members of the National Board and decides upon political strategy papers, which altogether form the manifesto. During the year, the Council of Delegates meets four times and decides on current business, e.g. adopts the positions of the party on popular votes and referendums. The Young Liberals organized a referendum against fixed book prices and won the public vote. The National Board is responsible for the daily business and coordination with the cantonal sections.

National Board The current members of the National Board (as of Spring 2025):

- President: Jonas Lüthy (BS)
- Vice president: Melanie Racine (SO)
- Vice president: Pauline Blanc (VD)
- General Secretary : Eleah Paetsch (AG)
- Treasurer: Michael Umbricht (AG)
- Political Planning: Thomas von Allmen (LU)
- Responsible for Cantonal Sections: Nathan Näpfli (VS)
- Campaigns and Webmaster: Anna Staub (AG)
- Social Media: Alessia Wehrli (GR)
