= Gottfried Kunz =

Swiss politician

Gottfried Kunz (12 December 1859 – 5 January 1930) was a Swiss politician and President of the Swiss Council of States (1912/1913).

Preceded by Felix Calonder	President of the Council of States; 1912/1913	Succeeded by Eugène Richard
