= Christian Sahli =

Swiss politician

Christian Sahli (6 March 1825 in Meikirch – 27 March 1897) was a Swiss politician and President of the Swiss Council of States (1866/1867 and 1880/1881).

Preceded by Emil Welti	President of the Council of States; 1866/1867	Succeeded by Johann Jakob Blumer
Preceded by Karl Rudolf Stehlin	President of the Council of States; 1880/1881	Succeeded by Karl Kappeler
