= Communal secretary =

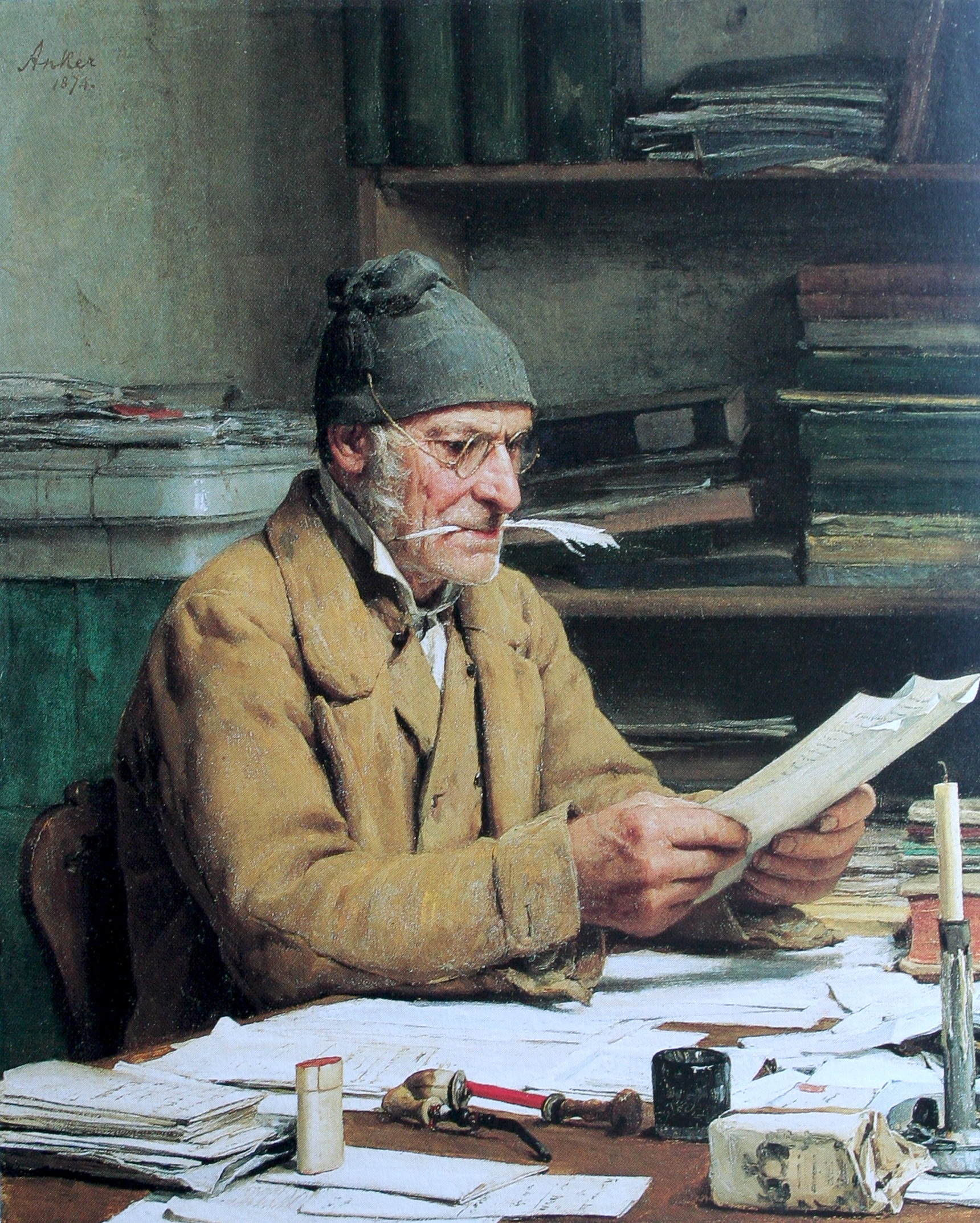
The Communal Secretary, by Albert Anker (1874)

In a Swiss commune, the communal secretary (French: secrétaire communal, German: Gemeindeschreiber) is, depending on the municipality's size, either a simple office clerk, or he may be the director of all administrative affairs, with dozens of employees working under his direction. The secretary is politically neutral, and handles all administrative affairs that do not require the powers reserved to the elected municipal executive. The communal secretary's duties are similar to the municipal clerk's in the United Kingdom.

In small communes, duties typically include handling correspondence, book-keeping, sending and paying bills, processing requests for identity cards, passports and building permits, registering new inhabitants, and recording marriages and deaths. The secretary is present at all meetings of the municipal executive, and keeps their meeting minutes. In close cooperation with the executive, he supports their decision-making. He can issue permits, sign contracts and hire employees.

The necessary qualifications vary by canton. While smaller communes require some years of professional experience in public administration, larger towns and cities require a Bachelor's or master's degree in law. Some cantons require the completion of the relevant Certificate of Advanced Study, which covers topics such as:

- typical legal issues encountered by communes:
  - communal law
  - procedural law
  - finances
  - laws related to families and protection of children (e.g. child protective services)
  - social welfare
- environmental laws, zoning, urban planning
- project management, risk management, government procurement
- laws and regulations concerning employees, personnel management, leadership, intercultural communication
