= Christine Häsler =

Swiss politician

Christine Häsler-Amacher
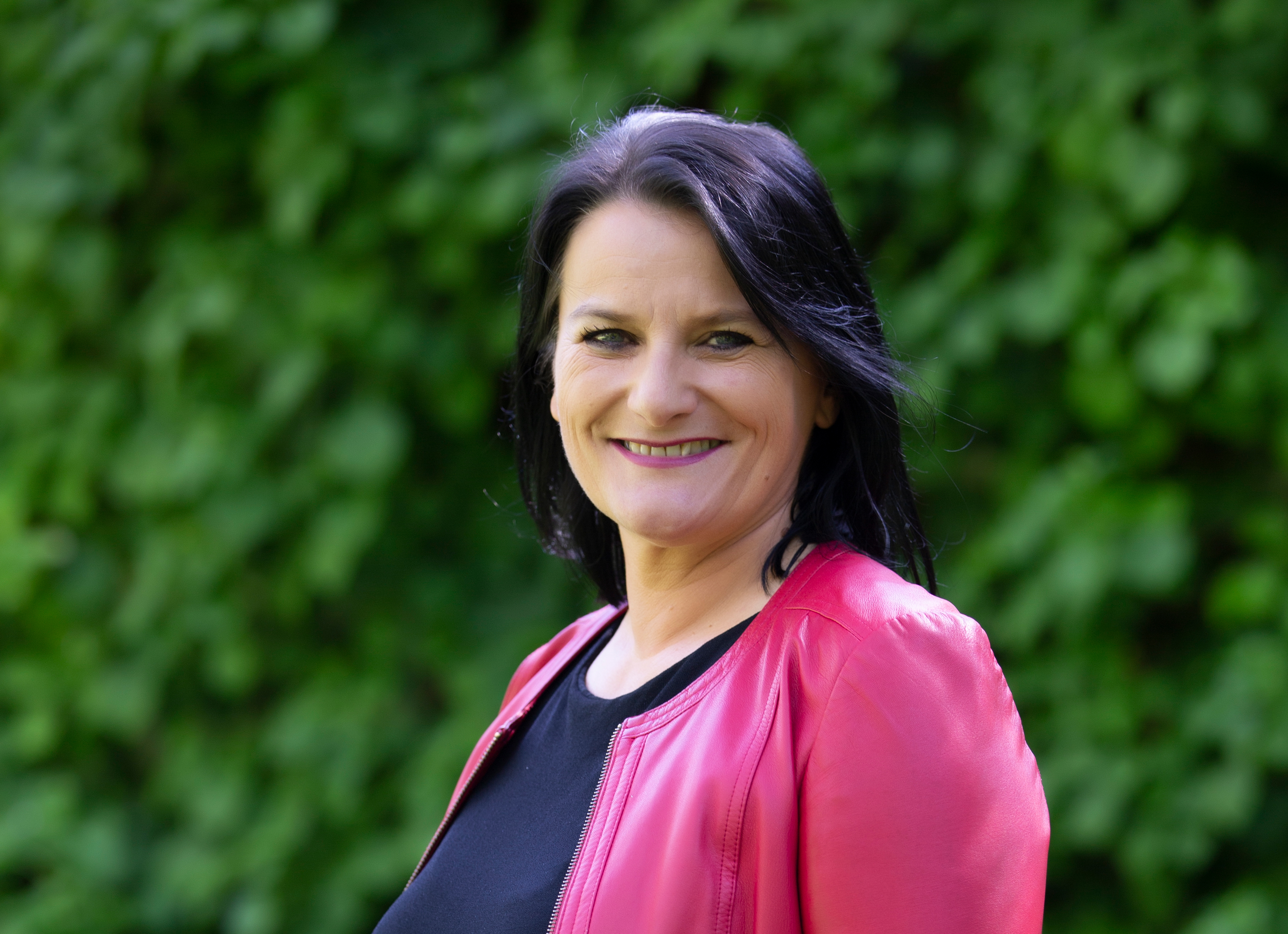
- Born: 11 January 1963; Unterseen, Bern, Switzerland
- Occupations: politician (regional and national)
- Political party: Green
- Spouse: divorced
- Children: 4 ( +2 grandchildren)

Christine Häsler (born 11 January 1963) is a Swiss politician (The Greens). She served between 2002 and 2015 as a member of the Grand Council (cantonal parliament) of Bern. She moved into national politics in June 2015 when she became a member of the country's National Council (lower house of the federal/national parliament). 2018 she was elected as member of the government of the Canton of Bern.

== Biography ==
Christine Häsler was born in Unterseen, a quarter on the western side of Interlaken, in the Canton of Bern. She attended school in nearby Grindelwald and Wilderswil. She then undertook a 3/4 year commercial apprenticeship with the Grindelwald district council. She subsequently worked as clerk to the local council at Lütschental, where her family has its roots. More recently she took over the house in the adjacent hamlet of Burglauenen where her grandparents parents had lived. Since 2011, she has worked as head of communications with Kraftwerke Oberhasli, an energy (hydro-electricity) company with a sideline in tourist attractions.

== Politics ==
Häsler served between 2002 and 2015 as a member of the Grand Council of Bern. During that time she served between 2006 and 2014 as leader of the Green Party group in the assembly. In the cantonal elections of 2014 she achieved the second best result in her voting district, "Interlaken-Oberhasli". The result was particularly noteworthy because of the deeply conservative nature of the constituency.

After the unexpected resignation of Alec von Graffenried in June 2015, she became a member of the country's National Council. Later that year she was elected to the parliament in the October general election.

In 2018 Häsler was elected as member of the government of the Canton of Bern and therefore left the National Council.
