= VCS Verkehrs-Club der Schweiz =

Swiss Association for Transport and Environment
- (in German) Verkehrs-Club der Schweiz (in French) Association transports et environnement (in Italian) Associazione traffico e ambiente
- Founded: 1979; 47 years ago
- Purpose: sustainable transport in Switzerland
- Location(s): Bern and further cantonal sections, as well as in Liechtenstein
- Region served: Switzerland and Liechtenstein
- Members: About 100,000
- Key people: managing directors: Caroline Beglinger Fedorova, and Martin Enz
- Website: Official website (in German, French, and Italian)

The VCS Verkehrs-Club der Schweiz (French: ATE Association transports et environnement; Italian: ATA Associazione traffico e ambiente; English: Swiss Association for Transport and Environment) is an association that provides a human and environmentally compatible mobility in Switzerland.

== Goals ==
VCS was established in 1979 to commit a sustainable transport policy in Switzerland. It supports an optimally transposed interaction of the various Swiss transport carriers, among them public railway, tram and bus transport, pedestrian and bicycle transport, individual transport by car, and goods transport by rail and trucks. Its about 100,000 VCS members form the largest transport association dedicated to sustainable mobility, by car, tram or bicycle, whether on foot or by train and bus.

Among its campaigns, VCS filed a complaint against the shopping mall Seedamm-Center which planned to expand its facilities.

The VCS' goals include, among others, the economical use of energy, to promote environmental-neutral car, to contain immoderate road construction in Switzerland, consultations, promotion of public transport, political initiatives to support public transport, shift of freight to rail, improving road safety. Based in Bern, VCS provides for its members an eco-motor insurance, roadside assistance, emergency hotline, and so on.
