= Flavia Wasserfallen =

Swiss politician

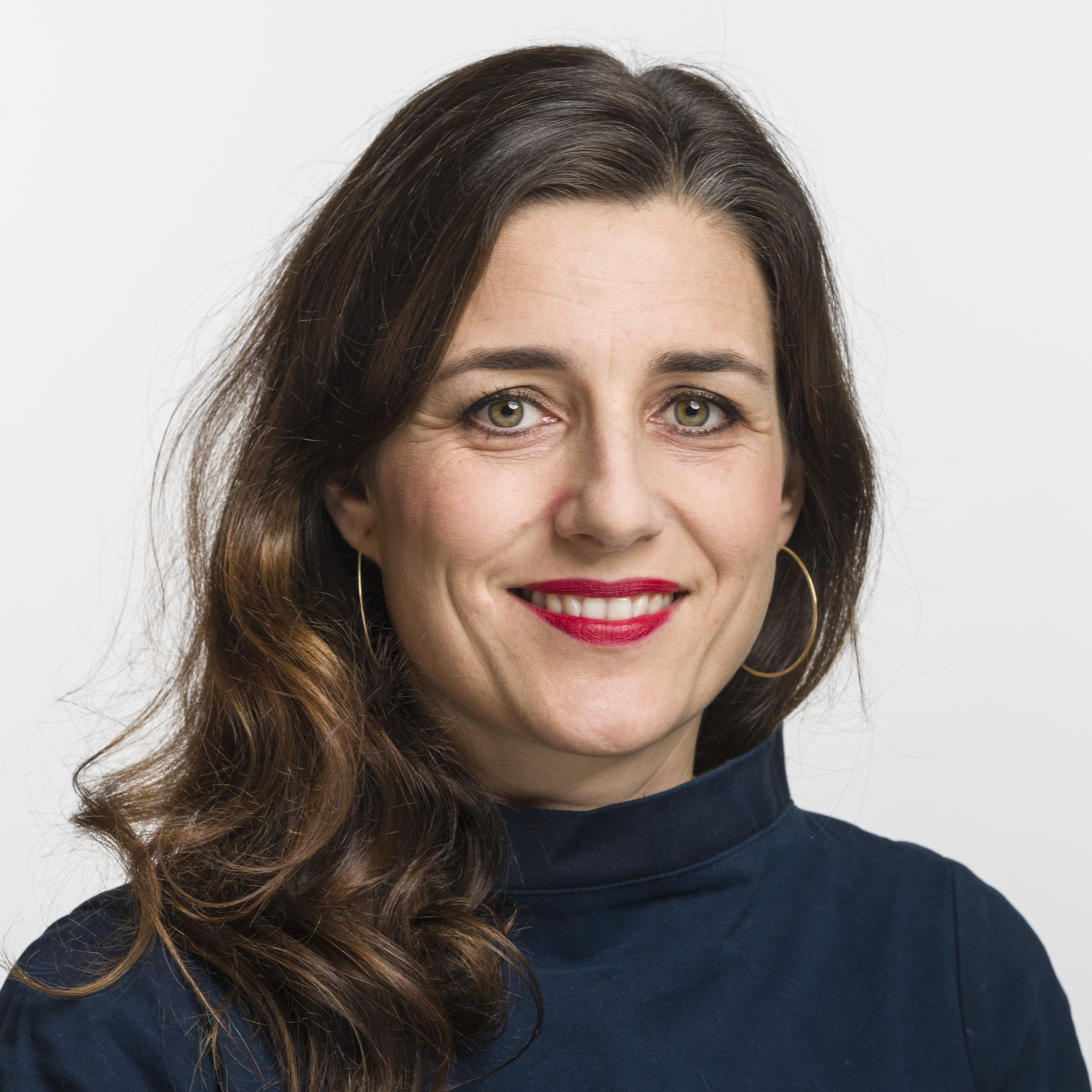
- Official portrait, 2019

Member of the Council of States (Switzerland)
- Incumbent
- Assumed office 4 December 2023
- Constituency: Canton of Bern

Member of the National Council (Switzerland)
- In office 28 May 2018 – 3 December 2023

Personal details
- Born: Flavia Alessandra Wasserfallen; 7 February 1979 (age 47) Bern, Switzerland
- Spouse: Omar El Mohib (m. 2007)
- Children: 3
- Education: University of Bern (Master's degree); University of Bologna
- Website: Official website Parliament website

Flavia Alessandra Wasserfallen (Swiss Standard German: [ˈflaːvi̯a ˈvasərˌfalən]; born 7 February 1979) is a Swiss politician who serves on the Council of States (Switzerland) the Social Democratic Party since 2023. She previously served on the National Council (Switzerland) from 2018 to 2023 and the Grand Council of Bern between 2002 and 2012. She is likely not related to Christian Wasserfallen of The Liberals.

== Early life and education ==
Wasserfallen was born 7 February 1979 in Bern, Switzerland, the oldest of three children, to Bruno Wasserfallen (born 1948) and Anna Wasserfallen (née Mastrocola), both municipal politicians for the Social Democratic Party. Her maternal grandfather, Mario Mastrocola (1914–1978), was an Italian bassoon musician, who naturalized as a Swiss citizen in 1960.

She has two younger brothers and was raised in the hamlet of Hinterkappelen (part of Wohlen bei Bern). In 1998, Wasserfallen completed her Matura, at Gymnasium Bern-Neufeld, followed by a gap year spent working as a snowboard teacher. Between 2000–2007, she completed studies with a major in political science and a minor in economics, at the University of Bern and erasmus exchange at the University of Bologna, graduating with a Master's degree.

== Professional career ==
Wasserfallen was a freelance snowboard teacher for a gap year in 1999 and thereafter during her studies at the University of Bern. In 2006, she started her professional career working in a variety of positions at the Federal Office of Energy.

In 2010 she established a local service who distributes organic vegetables to the city of Bern. She credits this with keeping her in contact with working people.

== Political career ==
Between 2012 and 2018 she was a member of the Grand Council of Bern and the co-secretary of the SP. She succeeded Evi Alleman (who was elected into the executive council of Bern) in the National Council in June 2018. After Simonetta Sommaruga announced her resignation from the Federal Council in November 2022, she was considered a potential candidate, but she declined, alleging her envisioned candidacy to the Council of States. During the 2023 Swiss federal election, Wasserfallen was elected into the Council of States (Switzerland).

=== Political views ===
She advocates for equal pay and affordable health care. She advocates for better working conditions in relation to the patients and she is the president of the Mother and Father Counseling Association. In September 2020, she was a co-founder of FC Helvetia, the female football team of the Swiss Parliament. In November 2022, Wasserfallen cut her hair in solidarity with the women in Iran, who were protesting against the Government in Iran after the death of Mahsa Amini.

== Personal life ==
Wasserfallen is married to Omar El Mohib. They have three children (born 2008, 2012 and 2016).

Her place of origin is Langnau im Emmental and Ferenbalm.
