= Grand Council of Bern =

Parliament of the Swiss canton of Bern

Grand Council Grosser Rat (German) Grand conseil (French)

Type
- Type: Unicameral

Leadership
- President: Jürg Iseli

Structure
- Seats: 160
- Political groups: SVP/UDC 44; SP/PS 32; Greens (GPS/PES) 19; FDP/PLR 18; The Centre 12; GLP/PVL 16; EVP/PEV 9; EDU/UDF 6; PSA 1; AL 1; Ensemble Socialiste 1; Independent 1

Elections
- Voting system: Party-list proportional representation Hagenbach-Bischoff system
- Last election: 2022

Meeting place
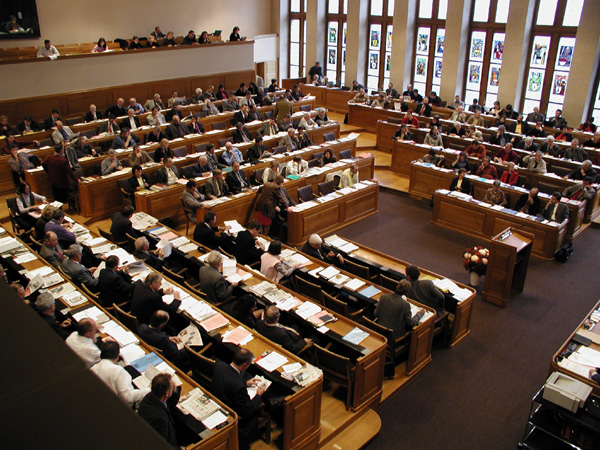
- Rathaus

Website
- https://www.gr.be.ch/

The Grand Council (German: Grosser Rat, French: Grand conseil) is the parliament of the Swiss canton of Bern.

It consists of 160 members (as of 2006) elected by proportional representation for a four-year term of office. The French-speaking part of the canton, the Bernese Jura (districts of Courtelary, La Neuveville and Moutier) has 12 seats guaranteed, and 3 seats are guaranteed for the French-speaking minority of the bilingual district of Biel/Bienne.

== Election ==
The council is re-elected every four years. Like other legislatures in Switzerland, elections use party list proportional representation. There are nine constituencies, based on the districts of the Canton. Seats were last reallocated for the 2022 election.

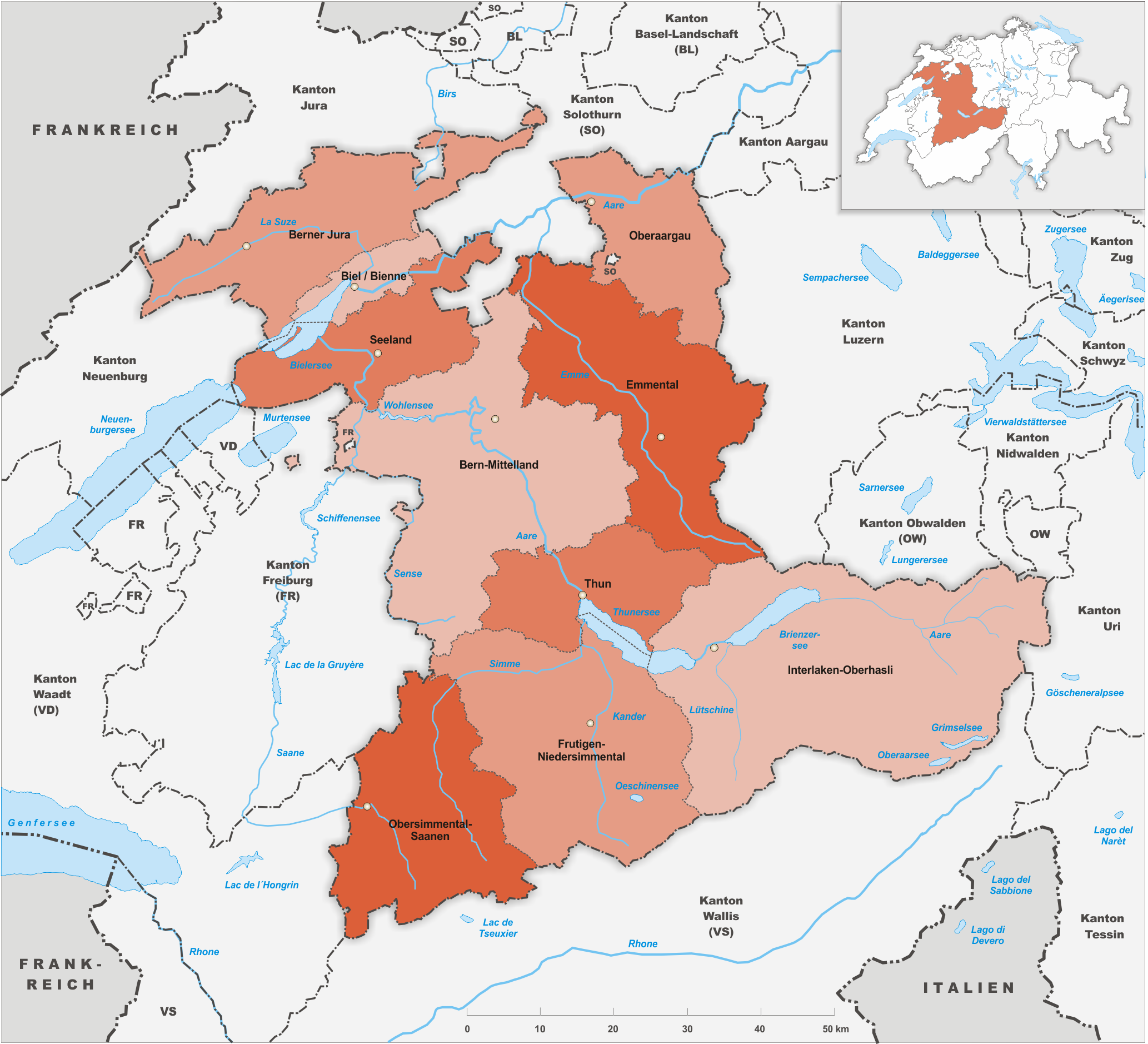
Districts of the canton of Bern

Constituency	Boundaries	Seats
Biel-Bienne - Seeland	Districts of Biel/Bienne and Seeland	27
Mittelland North	North Part of Bern-Mittelland	22
Bern	City of Bern	20
Mittelland-South	South Part of Bern-Mittelland	20
Thun	District of Thun	16
Oberland	Oberland region (contains three districts)	16
Emmental	District of Emmental	15
Bernese Jura	District of Jura Bernois	12
Oberaargau	District of Oberaargau	12

== Composition ==
The last election was held in 2022.

2018–2022 composition of the Grand Council
