= 1998 in Switzerland =

- Decades: 1970s; 1980s; 1990s; 2000s; 2010s
- See also: History of Switzerland; Timeline of Swiss history; List of years in Switzerland

Events during the year 1998 in Switzerland.

== Incumbents ==
- Federal Council:
  - Flavio Cotti (president)
  - Arnold Koller
  - Jean-Pascal Delamuraz (until March), then Pascal Couchepin
  - Kaspar Villiger
  - Ruth Dreifuss
  - Adolf Ogi
  - Moritz Leuenberger

== Events ==
- 5–12 December – The 1998 European Curling Championships take place in Flims.

== Births ==
- 12 March – Alina Müller, ice hockey player

== Deaths ==
- 4 October – Jean-Pascal Delamuraz, politician (born 1936)
