= 1996 in Switzerland =

- Decades: 1970s; 1980s; 1990s; 2000s; 2010s
- See also: History of Switzerland; Timeline of Swiss history; List of years in Switzerland

Events in the year 1996 in Switzerland.

== Incumbents ==
- Federal Council:
  - Jean-Pascal Delamuraz (President)
  - Kaspar Villiger
  - Arnold Koller
  - Flavio Cotti
  - Ruth Dreifuss
  - Adolf Ogi
  - Moritz Leuenberger

== Births ==
- 17 March – Viola Calligaris, association footballer
- 28 April – Luana Bühler, association footballer
- 15 July – Ajla Del Ponte, sprinter
- 12 August – Nikita Ducarroz, BMX cyclist
- 17 October – Princess Marie-Caroline of Liechtenstein
- 19 December – Sandrine Mauron, association footballer
- 23 December – Lydia Hiernickel, cross-country skier

== Deaths ==
- 20 March – Hans Conzett, politician and publisher
- 30 May – François Genoud, financier and Nazi collaborator
- 11 June – Brigitte Helm, German actress
- 4 July – Pierre Jaccoud, lawyer and politician
- 25 July – Howard Vernon, actor
- 15 August – Max Thurian, priest
- 27 August – Martin Disler, painter
- 30 August – Josef Müller-Brockmann, graphic designer.
- 1 October – Alfred Vogel, herbalist
- 4 November – Gottlieb Weber, Olympic cyclist
