= 1997 in Switzerland =

- Decades: 1970s; 1980s; 1990s; 2000s; 2010s
- See also: History of Switzerland; Timeline of Swiss history; List of years in Switzerland

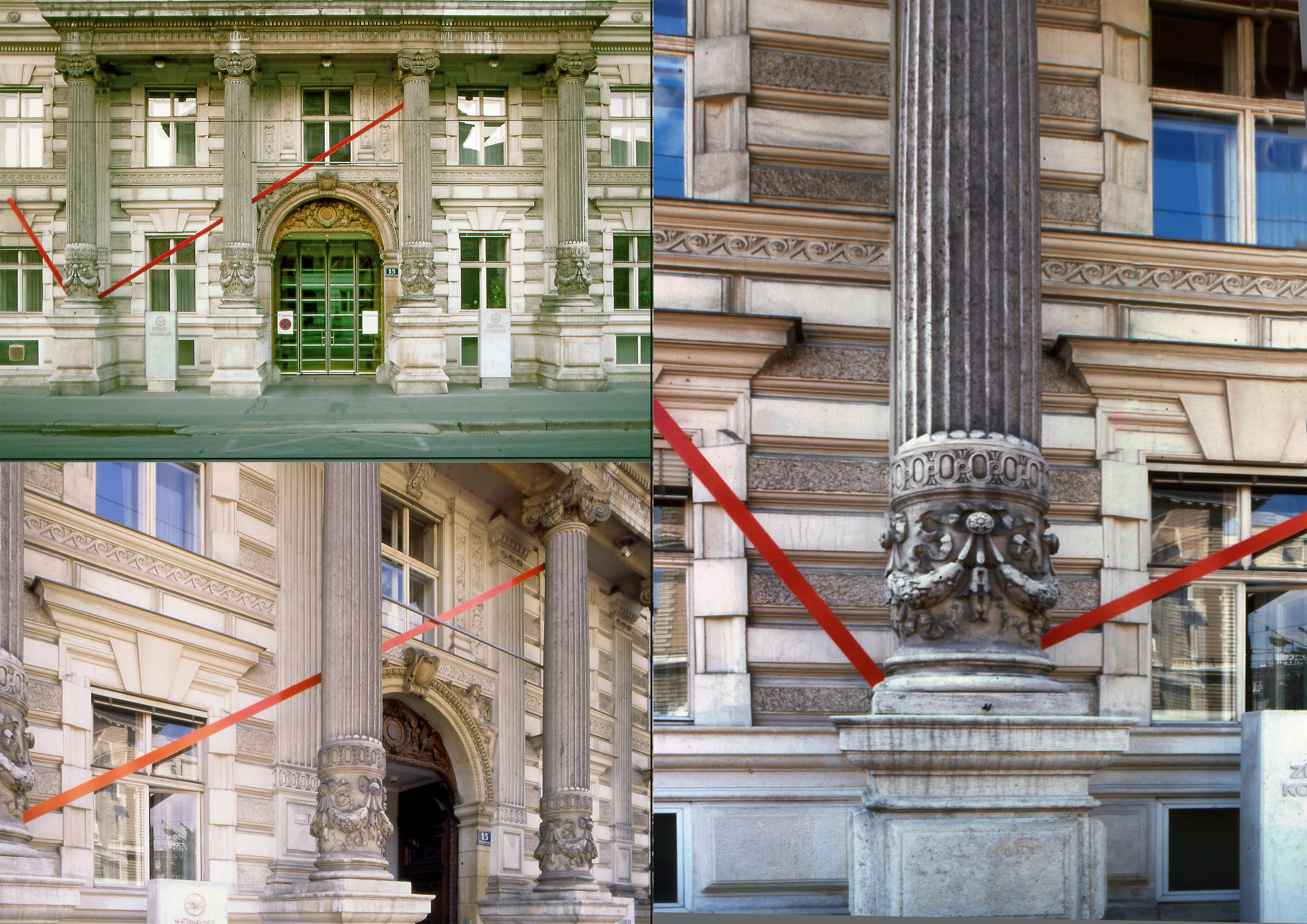
Zürich Kosmos 1997

Events during the year 1997 in Switzerland.

== Incumbents ==
- Federal Council:
  - Arnold Koller (President)
  - Jean-Pascal Delamuraz
  - Kaspar Villiger
  - Flavio Cotti
  - Ruth Dreifuss
  - Adolf Ogi
  - Moritz Leuenberger

== Events ==
- 12–20 April – The 1997 World Men's Curling Championship and 1997 World Women's Curling Championship take place in Bern.
- 31 August–7September – The 1997 World Artistic Gymnastics Championships take place in Lausanne.
- International University in Geneva is established

== Births ==
- 10 March – Belinda Bencic, tennis player
- 3 April – Julia Stierli, association footballer
- 5 June – Andrea Brändli, ice hockey player
- 13 July – Sina Frei, cross-country cyclist
