= 1999 in Switzerland =

- Decades: 1970s; 1980s; 1990s; 2000s; 2010s
- See also: History of Switzerland; Timeline of Swiss history; List of years in Switzerland

Events during the year 1999 in Switzerland.

== Incumbents ==
- Federal Council:
  - Ruth Dreifuss (president)
  - Flavio Cotti
  - Arnold Koller
  - Pascal Couchepin
  - Kaspar Villiger
  - Adolf Ogi
  - Moritz Leuenberger

== Events ==
- The Sierre Tunnel opens in the canton of Valais.

== Births ==
- 21 January – Alisha Lehmann, association footballer
- 21 April – Géraldine Reuteler, association footballer
- 9 July – Camille Rast, alpine skier
- 3 August – Nemo, rapper

Full date missing

- Gianna Berger, politician
- Tino Polsini, orienteering competitor

== Deaths ==
- 4 March – Fritz Honegger, politician (born 1917)
