= 1993 in Switzerland =

- Decades: 1970s; 1980s; 1990s; 2000s; 2010s
- See also: History of Switzerland; Timeline of Swiss history; List of years in Switzerland

Events in the year 1993 in Switzerland.

== Incumbents ==
- Federal Council:
  - Otto Stich
  - Jean-Pascal Delamuraz
  - Kaspar Villiger
  - Arnold Koller
  - Flavio Cotti
  - René Felber then Ruth Dreifuss
  - Adolf Ogi (President)

== Events ==
- 28 March–4 April – The 1993 World Men's Curling Championship and 1993 World Women's Curling Championship take place in Geneva.
- 18 August – The 14th-century Kapellbrücke covered wooden truss bridge in Lucerne is largely destroyed by fire.
- 6–11 December – The 1993 European Curling Championships take place in Leukerbad.
- Switzerland in the Eurovision Song Contest 1993

== Births ==
- 5 January – Jolanda Neff, cyclist
- 16 February – Christophe Guedes, association footballer
- 2 March – Dany da Silva, association footballer
- 22 March – Andrea Ellenberger, alpine skier
- 12 May – Wendy Holdener, alpine skier
- 19 May – Sarah Forster, ice hockey player
- 23 May – Eseosa Aigbogun, association footballer
- 7 June – Gaëtan Karlen, association footballer
- 10 July – Marco Bürki, association footballer
- 13 July – Linda Indergand, cyclist
- 20 July – Debrah Scarlett, Norwegian-Swiss singer and songwriter
- 16 September – Jasmine Flury, alpine skier
- 29 November – Giulian Pedone, motorcycle racer
- 5 December – Michelle Gisin, alpine slier
- Olivier Jäckle, association footballer

== Deaths ==
- 20 January – Audrey Hepburn, British actress (born 1929 in Belgium)
- 8 February – Franz Schnyder, film director and screenwriter (born 1910)
- 13 March – Jean Tamini, association footballer (born 1919)
