= 1994 in Switzerland =

- Decades: 1970s; 1980s; 1990s; 2000s; 2010s
- See also: History of Switzerland; Timeline of Swiss history; List of years in Switzerland

Events in the year 1994 in Switzerland.

== Incumbents ==
- Federal Council:
  - Otto Stich (President)
  - Jean-Pascal Delamuraz
  - Kaspar Villiger
  - Arnold Koller
  - Flavio Cotti
  - Ruth Dreifuss
  - Adolf Ogi

== Events ==
- 4–5 October – 53 members of the cult, Order of the Solar Temple, commit mass suicide in Switzerland and Canada.
- The International Tropical Timber Agreement, 1994 was signed.
- FC Breitenrain Bern was established.

== Births ==
- 7 January – Phoebe Stänz, ice hockey player
- 17 January – Tom Bohli, cyclist
- 26 January – Salim Khelifi, footballer
- 7 February – Nina Christen, sports shooter
- 6 March – Armin Alesevic, footballer
- 14 March – Leonardo Bertone, footballer
- 24 March – Giulia Steingruber, artistic gymnast
- 27 March – Birama Ndoye, footballer
- 15 May – Lara Stalder, ice hockey player
- 31 July – Florent Hadergjonaj, footballer
- 7 August – Jérémy Desplanches, swimmer
- 28 September – Corinne Suter, alpine skier
- 8 October – Luca Hänni, singer and winner of season 9 of Deutschland sucht den Superstar
- 13 December – Livia Altmann, ice hockey player
- Zoé Metthez, model and beauty pageant titleholder

== Deaths ==
- 10 March – Roger Bocquet, footballer (born 1921)
- 25 March – Max Petitpierre, politician (born 1899)
- 15 September – Ernst Fuchs, cyclist (born 1936)
