= 1995 in Switzerland =

- Decades: 1970s; 1980s; 1990s; 2000s; 2010s
- See also: History of Switzerland; Timeline of Swiss history; List of years in Switzerland

Events in the year 1995 in Switzerland.

== Incumbents ==
- Federal Council:
  - Kaspar Villiger (President)
  - Jean-Pascal Delamuraz
  - Arnold Koller
  - Otto Stich (until October), then Moritz Leuenberger (from September)
  - Flavio Cotti
  - Ruth Dreifuss
  - Adolf Ogi

== Events ==
- 9–16 December – The 1995 European Curling Championships take place in Grindelwald.

== Births ==
- 1 July – Lena Häcki-Groß, biathlete
- 5 July – Janine Alder, ice hockey player
- 29 September – Romy Eggimann, ice hockey player
- 16 October – Nadine Fähndrich, cross-country skier
- 23 December – Noelle Maritz, association footballer

== Deaths ==
- 1 March – Eugenio Corecco, Catholic bishop, cancer (born 1931)
- 8 March – Rudolf Geigy, biologist (born 1902)
- 29 December – Nello Celio, politician (born 1914)
