= 2000 in Switzerland =

- Decades: 1980s; 1990s; 2000s; 2010s; 2020s
- See also: History of Switzerland; Timeline of Swiss history; List of years in Switzerland

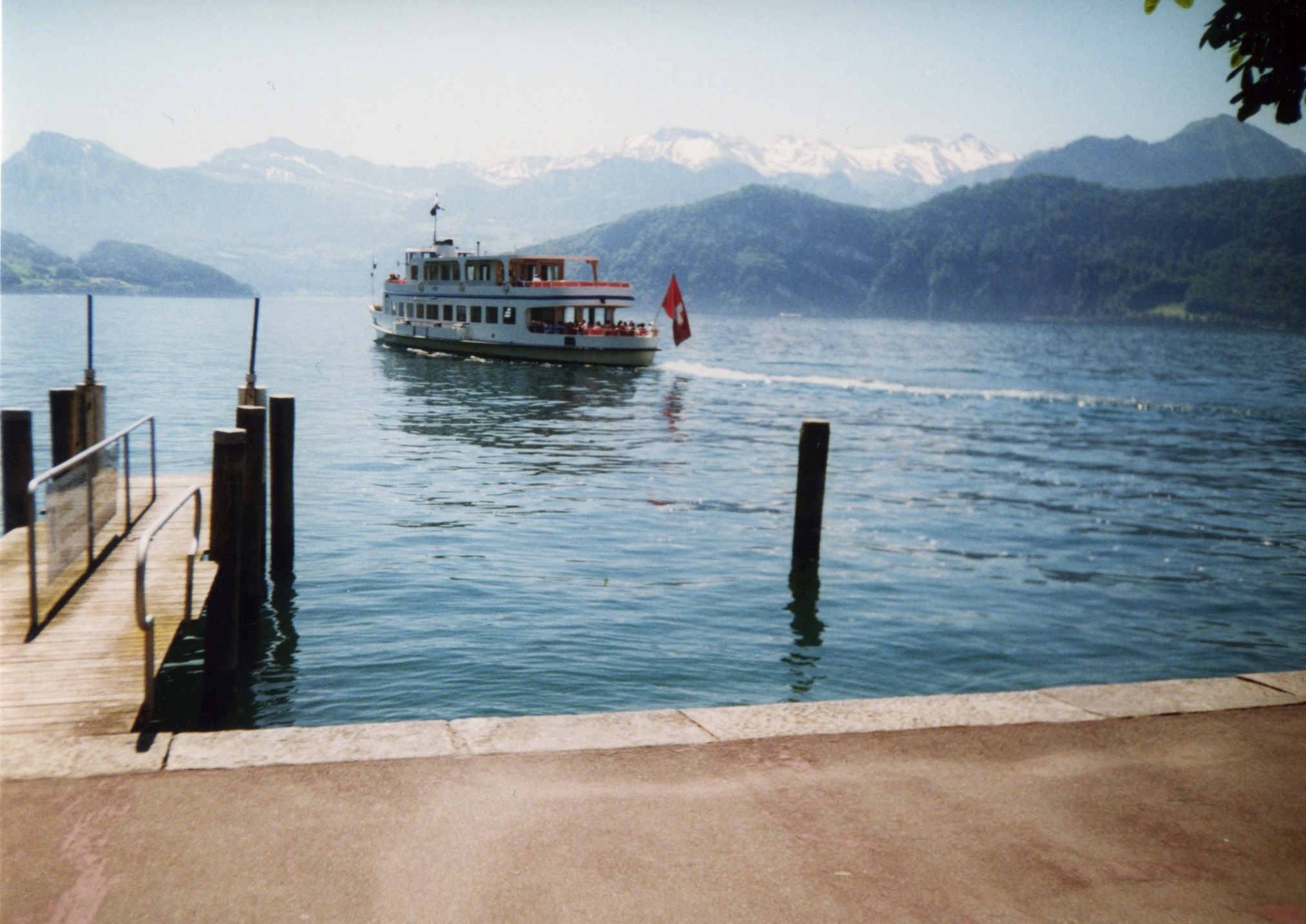
View of Lake Lucerne from Weggis, Switzerland; the departing passenger ship MS Pilatus in the center.

Events during the year 2000 in Switzerland.

== Incumbents ==
- Federal Council:
  - Adolf Ogi (president, until December)
  - Kaspar Villiger
  - Ruth Metzler-Arnold
  - Joseph Deiss
  - Pascal Couchepin
  - Moritz Leuenberger
  - Ruth Dreifuss
  - Samuel Schmid (from December)

== Events ==
- 26 March – A 22-year-old man opens fire from his apartment in Chur, killing a police dog and wounding two officers as they respond to the attack. In the only such case in Swiss police history, officers authorize a sniper to shoot the suspect to death.

== Births ==
- 4 February – Stefanie Wetli, ice hockey player
- 8 February – Mathilde Gremaud, freestyle skier
- 11 April – Nadine Riesen, association footballer
- 2 June – Seraina Piubel, association footballer
- 29 September – Amy Baserga, biathlete
