= 2002 in Switzerland =

- Decades: 1980s; 1990s; 2000s; 2010s; 2020s
- See also: History of Switzerland; Timeline of Swiss history; List of years in Switzerland

Events during the year 2002 in Switzerland.

== Incumbents ==
- Federal Council:
  - Kaspar Villiger (president)
  - Ruth Metzler-Arnold
  - Joseph Deiss
  - Samuel Schmid
  - Pascal Couchepin
  - Moritz Leuenberger
  - Ruth Dreifuss (until December), then Micheline Calmy-Rey

== Events ==
- 14–20 January – The 2002 European Figure Skating Championships take place in Lausanne.
- 2 March – A referendum takes place voting in favour of Switzerland joining the United Nations.
- 5–14 December – The 2002 European Curling Championships take place in Grindelwald.

== Births ==
- 14 March – Livia Peng, association footballer

== Deaths ==
- 8 September – Georges-André Chevallaz, politician (born 1915)
- 30 September – Hans-Peter Tschudi, politician (died 1913)
