= 1991 in Switzerland =

- Decades: 1970s; 1980s; 1990s; 2000s; 2010s
- See also: History of Switzerland; Timeline of Swiss history; List of years in Switzerland

Events in the year 1991 in Switzerland.

== Incumbents ==
- Federal Council:
  - Otto Stich
  - Jean-Pascal Delamuraz
  - Kaspar Villiger
  - Arnold Koller
  - Flavio Cotti (President)
  - René Felber
  - Adolf Ogi

== Births ==
- 8 January – Sarah Höfflin, freestyle skier
- 5 February – Anthony Sauthier, footballer
- 27 April – Lara Gut-Behrami, alpine skier
- 26 July
  - Sophie Anthamatten, ice hockey player
  - Selina Rutz-Büchel, runner
- 17 August – Steven Zuber, footballer
- 20 September – Marlen Reusser, cyclist
- 2 October – Joana Heidrich, beach volleyball player
- 23 October – Irene Cadurisch, biathlete
- 2 December – Elisa Gasparin, biathlete

== Deaths ==
- 2 March – Josef Stalder, gymnast (born 1919)
- 13 June – Loulou Boulaz, mountain climber and alpine skier (born 1908)
- 30 August – Jean Tinguely, sculptor (born 1925)
- 25 September – Anita Traversi, singer (born 1937)
