= 2003 in Switzerland =

- Decades: 1980s; 1990s; 2000s; 2010s; 2020s
- See also: History of Switzerland; Timeline of Swiss history; List of years in Switzerland

Events during the year 2003 in Switzerland.

== Incumbents ==
- Federal Council:
  - Pascal Couchepin (president)
  - Kaspar Villiger (until December), then Hans-Rudolf Merz
  - Ruth Metzler-Arnold (until December), then Christoph Blocher
  - Joseph Deiss
  - Samuel Schmid
  - Micheline Calmy-Rey
  - Moritz Leuenberger

== Births ==
- 29 April – Alayah Pilgrim, association footballer
- 7 August – Ella Touon, association footballer

== Deaths ==
- 5 July – Hedy Schlunegger, alpine skier (born 1923)
- 19 July – Pierre Graber, politician (born 1908)
