= 2001 in Switzerland =

- Decades: 1980s; 1990s; 2000s; 2010s; 2020s
- See also: History of Switzerland; Timeline of Swiss history; List of years in Switzerland

Events during the year 2001 in Switzerland.

== Incumbents ==
- Federal Council:
  - Moritz Leuenberger (president)
  - Kaspar Villiger
  - Ruth Metzler-Arnold
  - Joseph Deiss
  - Pascal Couchepin
  - Ruth Dreifuss
  - Samuel Schmid

== Events ==
- 31 March–8 April – The 2001 World Men's Curling Championship and 2001 World Women's Curling Championship take place in Lausanne.
- 1 May – Death of Samson Chukwu, a Nigerian asylum seeker while in police custody under similar circumstances to George Floyd.
- 27 September – A gunman kills 14 people in a parliament building in Zug before killing himself.

October

Monday, October 1st

Swissair Group requests a partial stay of bankruptcy and transfers its air transport operations to Crossair. 2,560 job cuts are planned.

Tuesday, October 2nd

All Swissair aircraft remain grounded, as the company no longer obtains kerosene to refuel its aircraft. 40,000 passengers are stranded at airports.

== Births ==
- 20 April – Nadja Kälin, cross-country skier
- 1 June – Noè Ponti, swimmer
- 17 August – Laura Felber, association footballer
