= Doris Leuthard =

Swiss Federal Councillor from 2006 to 2018

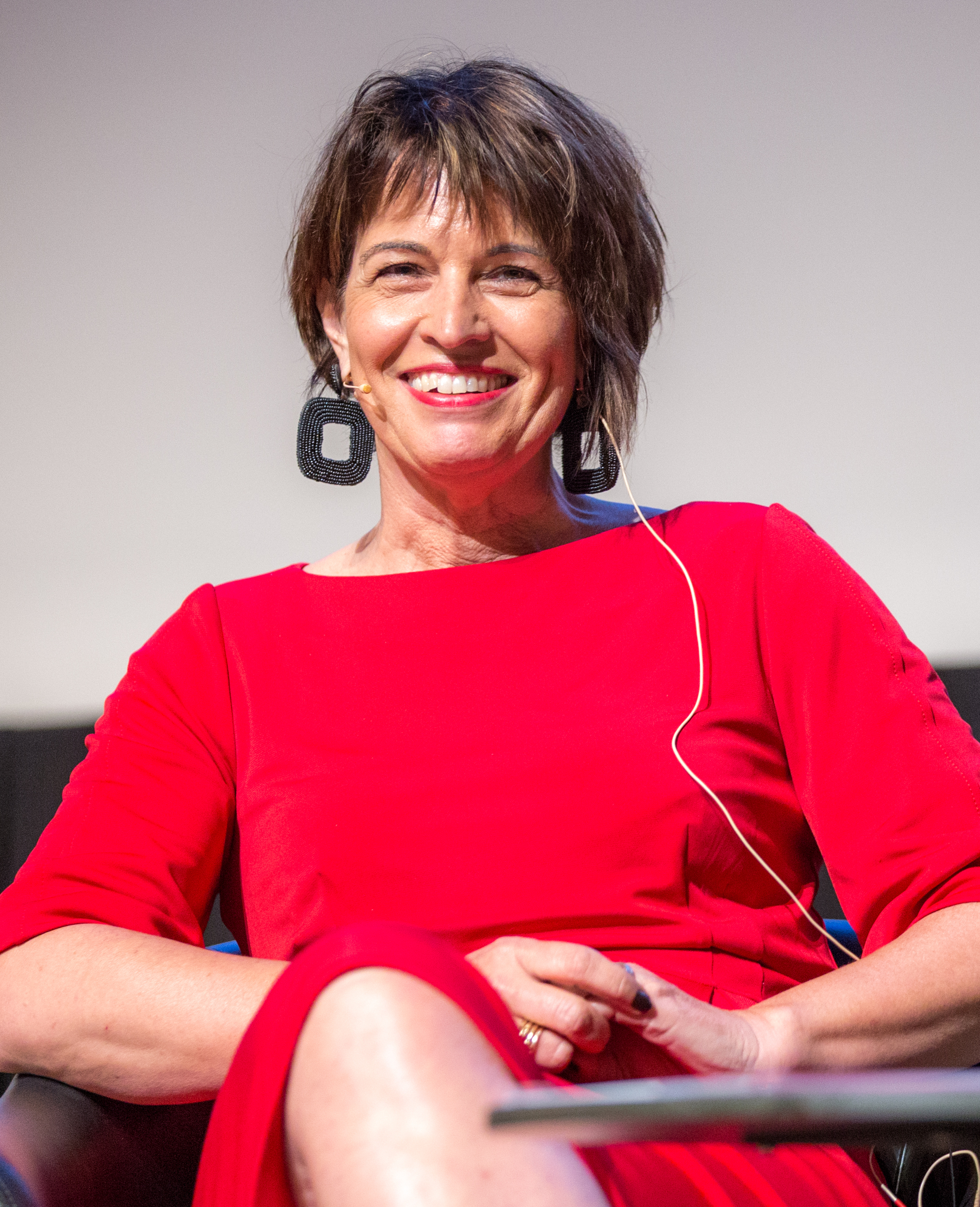
- Leuthard in 2018

President of Switzerland
- In office 1 January 2017 – 31 December 2017
- Vice President: Alain Berset
- Preceded by: Johann Schneider-Ammann
- Succeeded by: Alain Berset
- In office 1 January 2010 – 31 December 2010
- Vice President: Moritz Leuenberger; Micheline Calmy-Rey
- Preceded by: Hans-Rudolf Merz
- Succeeded by: Micheline Calmy-Rey

Vice President of Switzerland
- In office 1 January 2016 – 31 December 2016
- President: Johann Schneider-Ammann
- Preceded by: Johann Schneider-Ammann
- Succeeded by: Alain Berset
- In office 1 January 2009 – 31 December 2009
- President: Hans-Rudolf Merz
- Preceded by: Hans-Rudolf Merz
- Succeeded by: Moritz Leuenberger

Head of the Department of Environment, Transport, Energy and Communications
- In office 1 November 2010 – 31 December 2018
- Preceded by: Moritz Leuenberger
- Succeeded by: Simonetta Sommaruga

Head of the Department of Economic Affairs
- In office 1 August 2006 – 31 October 2010
- Preceded by: Joseph Deiss
- Succeeded by: Johann Schneider-Ammann

Member of the Swiss Federal Council
- In office 1 August 2006 – 31 December 2018
- Preceded by: Joseph Deiss
- Succeeded by: Viola Amherd

Personal details
- Born: 10 April 1963 (age 63) Merenschwand, Switzerland
- Party: Christian Democratic People's Party
- Spouse: Roland Hausin
- Education: University of Zurich
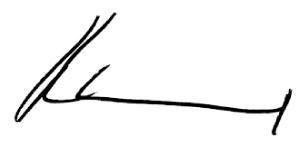
- Signature

Doris Leuthard (born 10 April 1963) is a Swiss politician and lawyer who served as a Member of the Swiss Federal Council from 2006 to 2018. A member of the Christian Democratic People's Party (CVP/PDC), she was elected as President of the Swiss Confederation for 2010 and 2017. Leuthard headed the Federal Department of Economic Affairs until 2010, when she became head of the Federal Department of Environment, Transport, Energy and Communications. As of 19 December 2019 she is a member of the board of the Kofi Annan Foundation and Stadler Rail.

== Biography ==
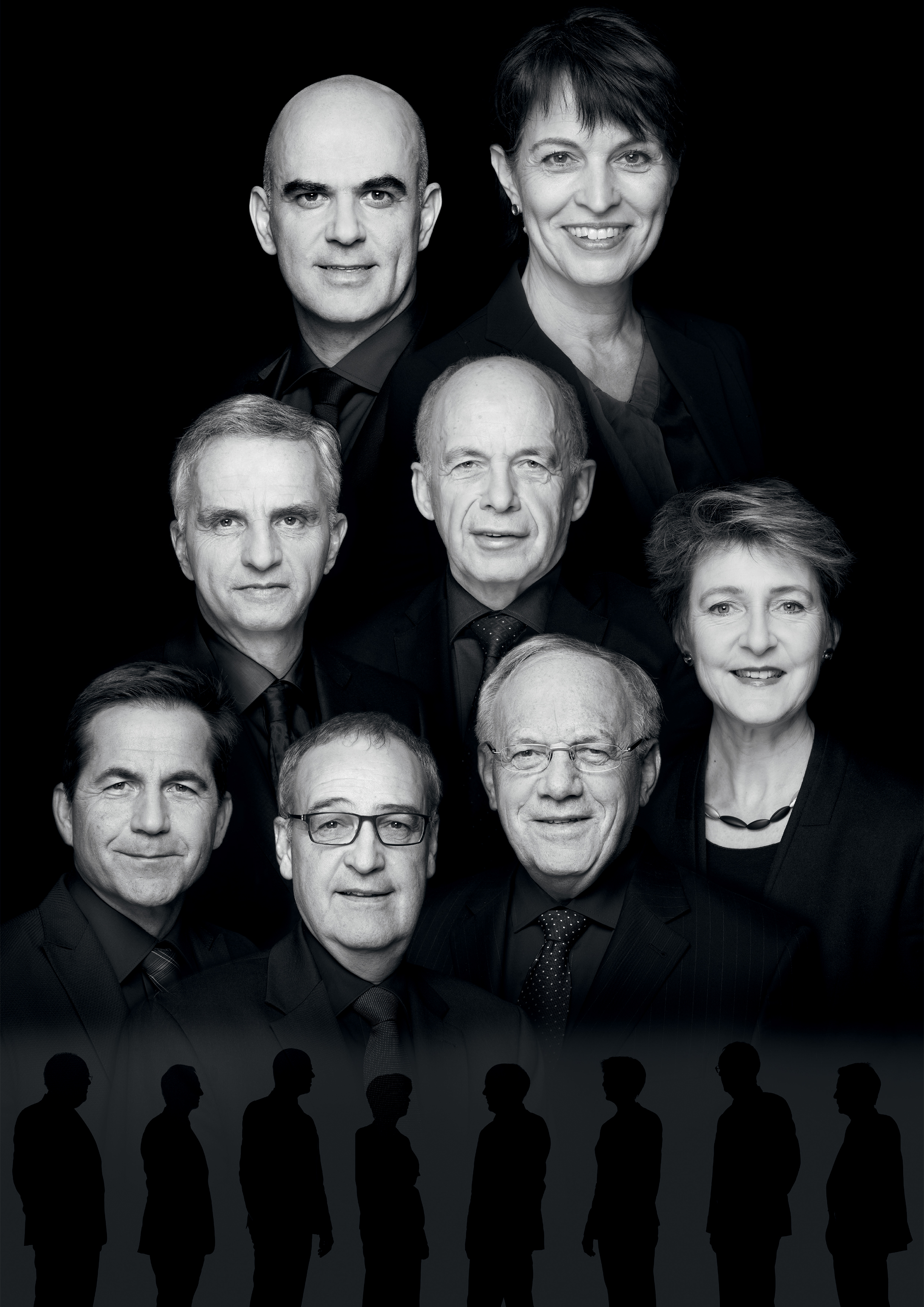
2017 Swiss Federal Council

Leuthard was a member of the Swiss National Council from 1999 to 2006 for the canton of Aargau. She presided over the Christian Democratic People's Party from 2004 to 2006. Following the resignation of Joseph Deiss from the Swiss Federal Council, Leuthard was elected as his successor on 14 June 2006. She received 133 out of 234 valid votes to become the 109th Federal Councillor. She is the fifth woman elected to the Federal Council. Her election represented a departure from a long precedent of replacing a Member of the Federal Council with someone from the same language group. While Deiss was a French speaker, Leuthard is a German speaker.

From 1 August 2006 until 31 October 2010, she was head of the Federal Department of Economic Affairs. On 1 November 2010 she became head of the Federal Department of Environment, Transport, Energy and Communications, succeeding Moritz Leuenberger. For the calendar year 2009, Leuthard was elected Vice President of the Swiss Confederation, virtually assuring her election as President of the Confederation for the calendar year 2010. Due to a large amount of turnover on the Federal Council in recent years, she was the longest-serving Federal Councillor not to have served as the body's president.

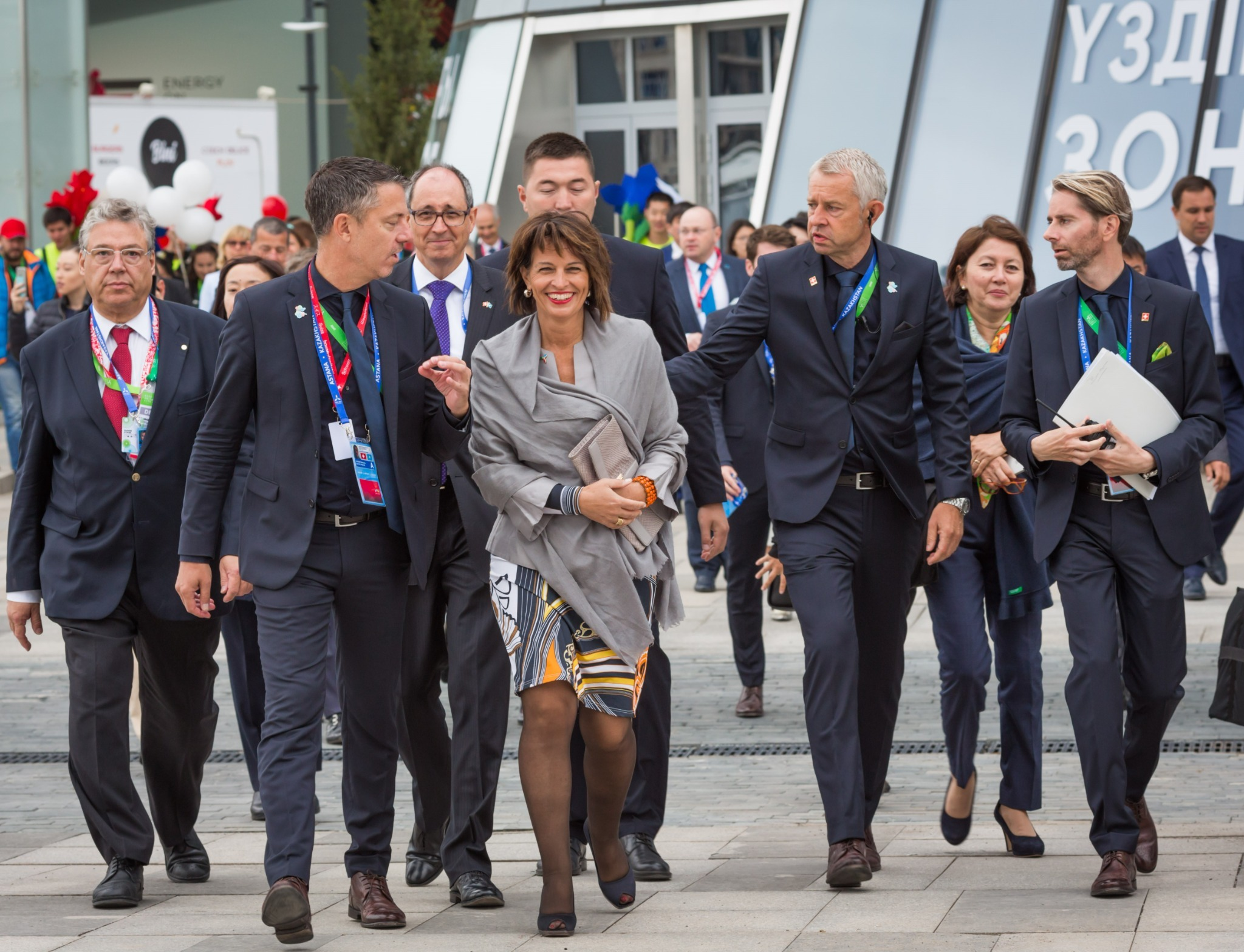
Astana, 11 August 2017 – National Expo Day of Switzerland at Expo 2017 Astana: From left to right: Filippo Lombardi, Councillor of State; Manuel Salchli, Commissioner General and Director of the Swiss Pavilion; Urs Schmid, Ambassador of Switzerland to Kazakhstan; Doris Leuthard, President of the Swiss Confederation; Ambassador Nicolas Bideau, Director of Presence Switzerland and Dieter A. Borer, Chief of Protocol of the Swiss Pavilion.

She was elected President of the Confederation for 2010 and 2017. She became the third woman to hold the post, after Ruth Dreifuss (1999) and Micheline Calmy-Rey (2007). As President of the Confederation, Leuthard presided over meetings of the Federal Council and carried out representative functions that would normally be handled by a head of state in other democracies (though in Switzerland, the Federal Council as a whole is regarded as the head of state). She was also the highest-ranking official in the Swiss order of precedence and had the power to act on behalf of the whole Federal Council in emergency situations. However, in most cases, Leuthard was merely primus inter pares, with no power above and beyond her six colleagues.

She was succeeded by Calmy-Rey in 2011, the first time two women held the office in succession. Following a reshuffle of portfolios after the by-election of two new Federal Councillors in 2010, Leuthard replaced outgoing Moritz Leuenberger at the head of the Federal Department of Environment, Transport, Energy and Communications. In her capacity as minister, she was appointed by United Nations Secretary General António Guterres in 2018 to the High-level Panel on Digital Cooperation, co-chaired by Melinda Gates and Jack Ma.

The project SAFFA 2020 is under the patronage of the three Federal Councillors: Leuthard, Simonetta Sommaruga and Eveline Widmer-Schlumpf, as well as by the former Federal Councillor Calmy-Rey.

In July 2022, Swiss media reported that Doris Leuthard was the victim of aggression by her husband in their vacation home in Ticino with a knife. Her husband has been detained in a psychiatric prison by the Swiss police because of the chance of recidivism and alcoholism.

== See also ==
- 2006 Swiss Federal Council election

Political offices
Preceded by Joseph Deiss	Member of the Swiss Federal Council; 2006–2018	Succeeded by Viola Amherd
Preceded by Joseph Deiss	Head of the Department of Economic Affairs; 2006–2010	Succeeded by Johann Schneider-Ammann
Preceded by Hans-Rudolf Merz	Vice President of Switzerland; 2009	Succeeded by Moritz Leuenberger
Preceded by Hans-Rudolf Merz	President of Switzerland; 2010	Succeeded by Micheline Calmy-Rey
Preceded by Moritz Leuenberger	Head of the Department of Environment, Transport, Energy and Communications; 2010–2018	Succeeded by Simonetta Sommaruga
Preceded by Johann Schneider-Ammann	Vice President of Switzerland; 2016	Succeeded by Alain Berset
Preceded by Johann Schneider-Ammann	President of Switzerland; 2017	Succeeded by Alain Berset
