= List of mayors of Martigny =

This is a list of mayors of Martigny. It includes the mayor (Président du Conseil municipal) of the city of Martigny, Valais, Switzerland. Initially, La Bâtiaz (since 1957) and Martigny-Bourg (since 1965) were not part of the municipality.

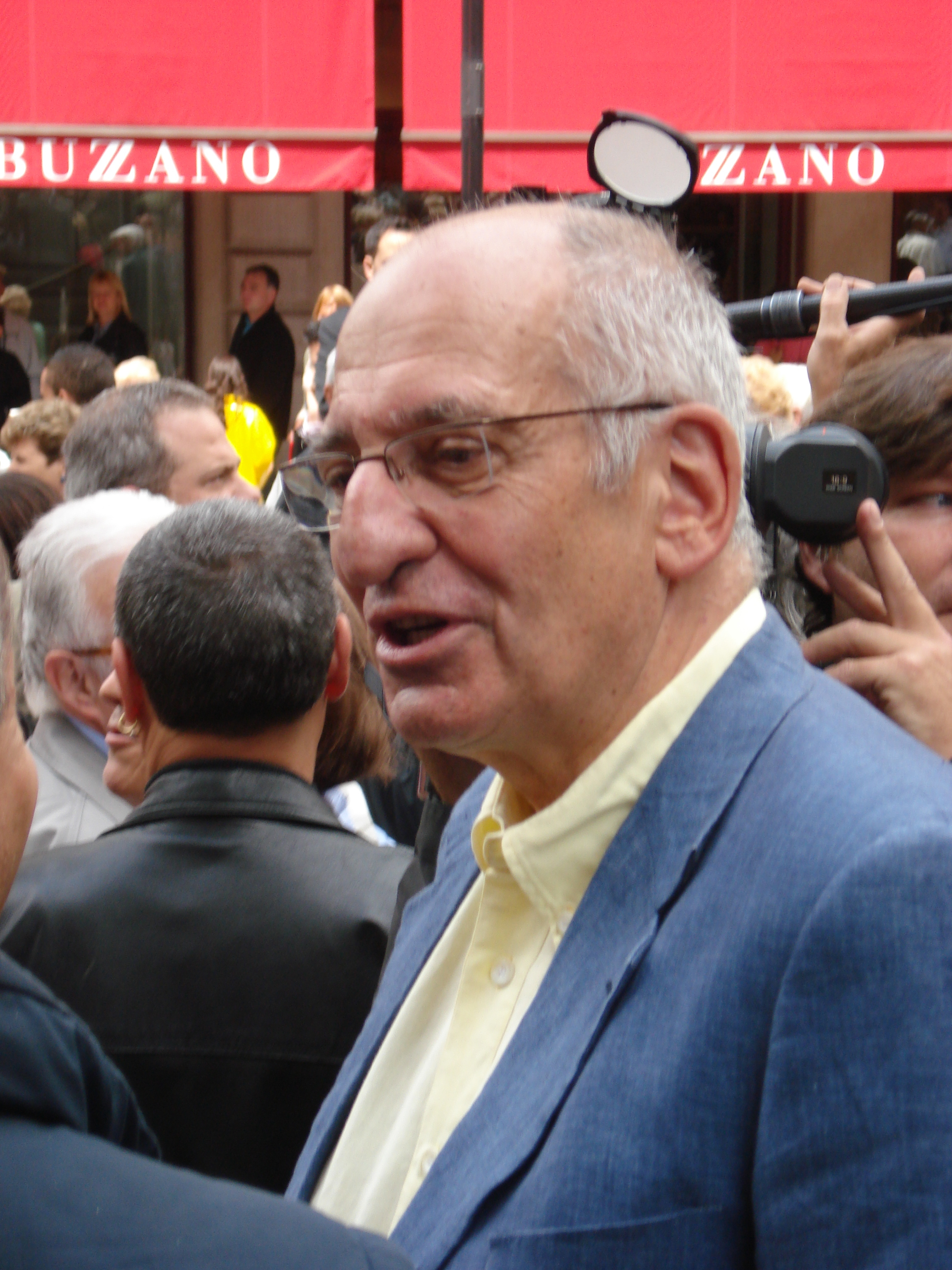
Pascal Couchepin was mayor of Martigny from 1985 to 1998

Coat of arms of Martigny

Mayor of Martigny
Term	Mayor	Lifespan	Party	Notes
1834–1837	Eugène Gay			
1837–1841	Joseph-Samuel Cropt			
1841–1843	Eugène Gay			
1843–1848	Valentin Morand			
1848–1850	Joseph Morand			
1850–1853	Joseph-Antoine Vouilloz			
1853–1858	Valentin Morand			
1859–1860	Alexis Gay			
1861–1864	Valentin Morand			
1864 (declined)	Joseph Morand			
1865–1868	Louis Closuit	(1817–1885)		
1869–1874	Charles Morand	(1832–1894)		
1875–1884	Alexis Gay			
1885–1888	Joseph Pillet	(1848–1913)		
1889–1900	Alphonse Orsat	(1836–1902)		
1901–1905	Louis Cropt			
1906–1918	Georges Morand	(1871–1918)		
1918–1920	Denis Orsat	(1863–1928)		
1921–1960	Marc Morand	(1888–1971)		
1961–1976	Edouard Morand	(born 1917)		
1977–1984	Jean Bollin			
1985–1998	Pascal Couchepin	(born 1942)		
1999–2003	Pierre Crittin			
2004–2008	Olivier Dumas			
2009–2016	Marc-Henri Favre			
2017–	Anne-Laure Couchepin Vouilloz			
