= Gret Loewensberg =

Swiss architect

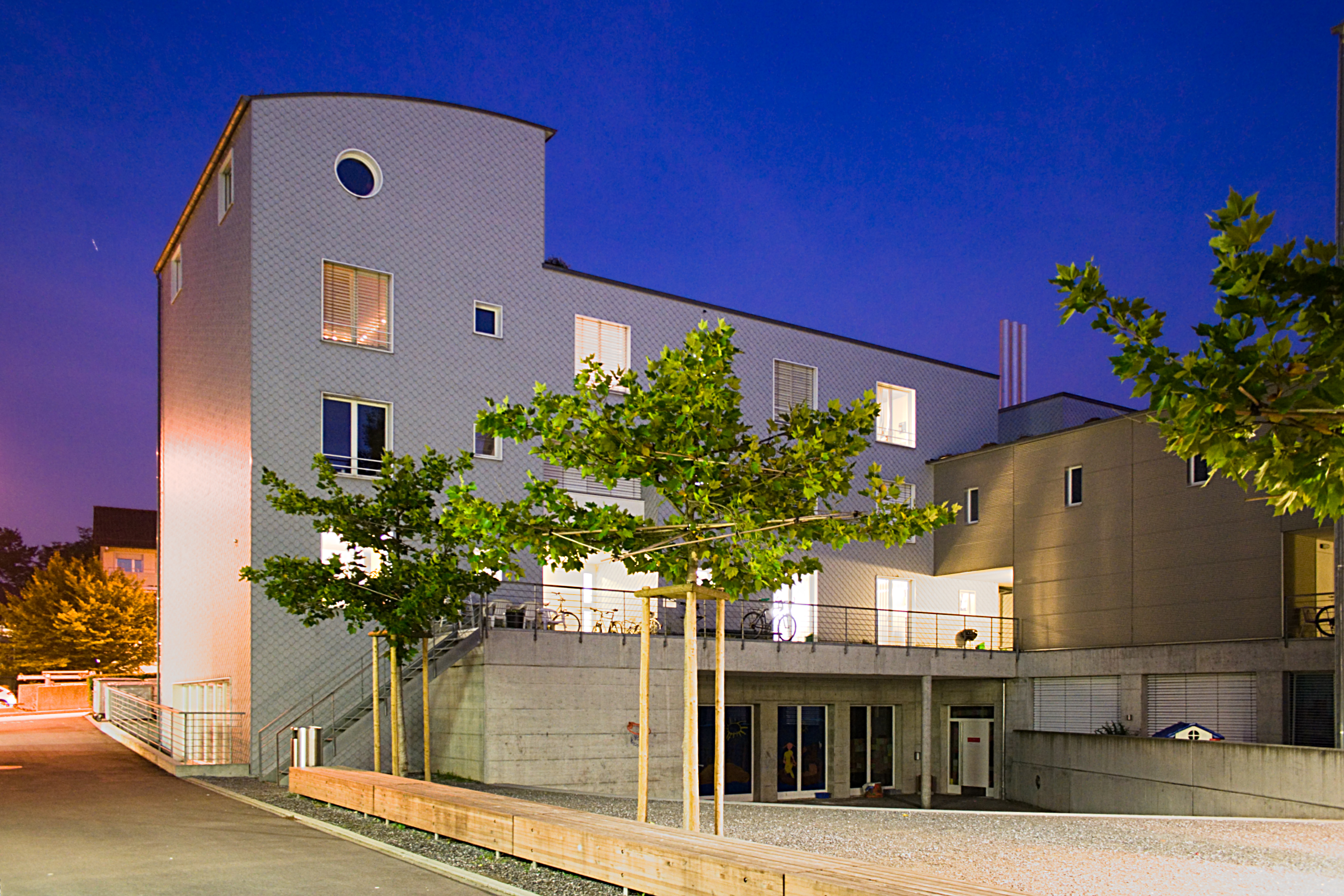
Netzwerk, student apartments designed by Loewensberg.

Margaretha "Gret" Loewensberg (born 17 January 1943) is a Swiss architect and the wife of former Swiss Federal Councillor Moritz Leuenberger.

As an architect, Loewensberg has made a name for herself in particular in the field of domestic architecture. Loewensberg studied architecture at the ETH Zurich and is a member of the SIA (Schweizerischer Ingenieur- und Architektenverein).
