= Le Confédéré =

Swiss newspaper

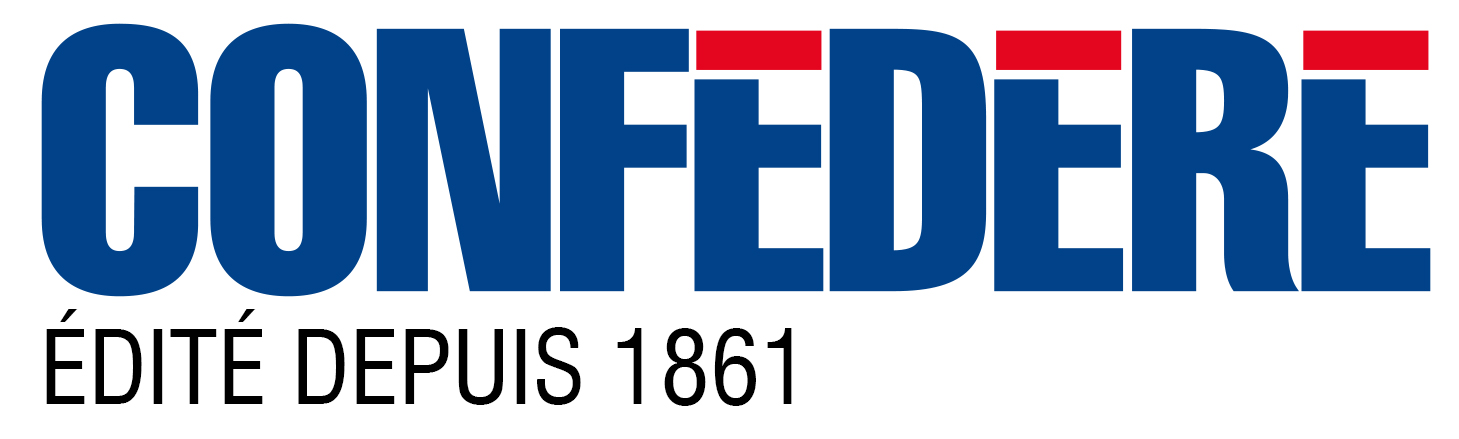
- Type: Weekly newspaper
- Format: Berliner
- Owner: Journal le Confédéré SA
- Founded: 2 January 1861
- Language: French
- City: Martigny
- Country: Switzerland
- Circulation: 1,500 (as of 2019)
- OCLC number: 716162936

Le Confédéré, formerly Le Confédéré du Valais, is a Swiss French-language weekly newspaper. Established in Sion in 1861, it later moved operations to Martigny. It is the oldest newspaper published continuously in Valais. It has maintained a liberal political line since its inception, and primarily focuses on politics, regional news, and opinion journalism.

== History ==
Le Confédéré was established in 1861, in Sion, Valais. Its first issue was printed 2 January 1861. It was initially titled Le Confédéré du Valais. It is the oldest newspaper published continuously in Valais; the Walliser Bote is older, but that paper was not published continuously. It moved its operations to Martigny in 1894.

From 1972 to 1976, its editor-in-chief was Pascal Couchepin, later the president of the Swiss Confederation. Couchepin was succeeded as editor-in-chief by Adolphe Ribordy, who was editor-in-chief until 2008; Ribordy continued to write a weekly column for the paper until his death in 2021.

In 2011, it celebrated its 150th anniversary. With the anniversary, the entire collection of the paper was digitized and made available online, and a three volume set on the history of the paper was released.

In 2018, facing financial problems due to declining advertising revenue and a shift towards digital media, as well as the bankruptcy of the media company Publicitas, the paper vacated its offices in Martigny and laid off its editor-in-chief, Jean-Jacques Michelet. By 2020, it had managed to reestablish itself.

== Profile ==
It has close ties to The Liberals and formerly served as the official mouthpiece of the Free Democratic Party of Valais until the 1970s. It has a liberal-democratic political alignment, and was created as a liberal journal critical of the conservative government. It primarily serves as a critical opinion journal, though also focuses on news, primarily on Valais politics and regional news, but also the politics of Switzerland as a whole. It is owned by Journal le Confédéré SA.

Le Confédéré is published weekly. It was established as a weekly paper, later moving to being a biweekly, and then a triweekly after 1920. For three years, from 1968 to 1971, it was a daily newspaper that was published alongside the Gazette de Lausanne. It then returned to being a biweekly paper, and in 1995 returned to being a weekly paper, a publication schedule it has maintained since. Households in Lower Valais occasionally receive the paper free of charge.

The paper is available exclusively in print, and does not have an online edition. It is printed in Monthey. Its circulation was 3,500 in the late 1960s, 4,230 in 2000, 4,000 in 2011, and 1,500 in 2019. In 2020, the newspaper changed from the A4 format to the Berliner format.
