= Armin Alesevic =

Swiss footballer (born 1994)

Personal information
- Full name: Armin Alesevic
- Date of birth: 6 March 1994 (age 32)
- Place of birth: Glarus, Switzerland
- Height: 1.83 m (6 ft 0 in)
- Position: Centre back

Youth career
- –2013: FC Zürich

Senior career*
| Years | Team | Apps | (Gls) |
| 2013–2019 | FC Zürich | 10 | (1) |
- * Club domestic league appearances and goals as of 11:35, 22 June 2018 (UTC)

Armin Alesevic (born 6 March 1994) is a Swiss footballer who currently plays as a centre back.

== Club career ==
Born in Glarus, Alesevic is a youth exponent form FC Zurich. He made his Swiss Super League debut at 18 May 2013 against FC Luzern. He played the full game, which ended in a 4–1 home win.

== Personal life ==
Alesevic is of Bosnian descent.
