= Christophe Guedes =

Swiss footballer (born 1993)

Personal information
- Date of birth: 16 February 1993 (age 33)
- Place of birth: Geneva, Switzerland
- Height: 1.87 m (6 ft 2 in)
- Position: Goalkeeper

Team information
- Current team: US Terre Sainte
- Number: 22

Youth career
- –2009: Chênois

Senior career*
Years	Team	Apps	(Gls)
2009–2011	Nyon	14	(0)
2011	Servette	0	(0)
2011–2012	Sion	0	(0)
2012–2017	Servette	18	(0)
2014–2015	→ Meyrin (loan)	7	(0)
2016	→ FC Azzurri LS 90 (loan)	7	(0)
2017–2018	Étoile Carouge	23	(0)
2018–2020	Stade Lausanne-Ouchy	33	(0)
2020–2021	Yverdon	1	(0)
2021–2024	Nyon	59	(0)
2024–	US Terre Sainte	1	(0)
- * Club domestic league appearances and goals as of 31 August 2024

Christophe Guedes (born 16 February 1993) is a Swiss footballer who plays as a goalkeeper for US Terre Sainte.

== Career ==
On 10 March 2010, Guedes made his professional debut with Nyon in a 2009–10 Swiss Challenge League match against Locarno, when he started and played the full game.
