= Micheline Calmy-Rey =

Swiss Federal Councillor from 2003 to 2011

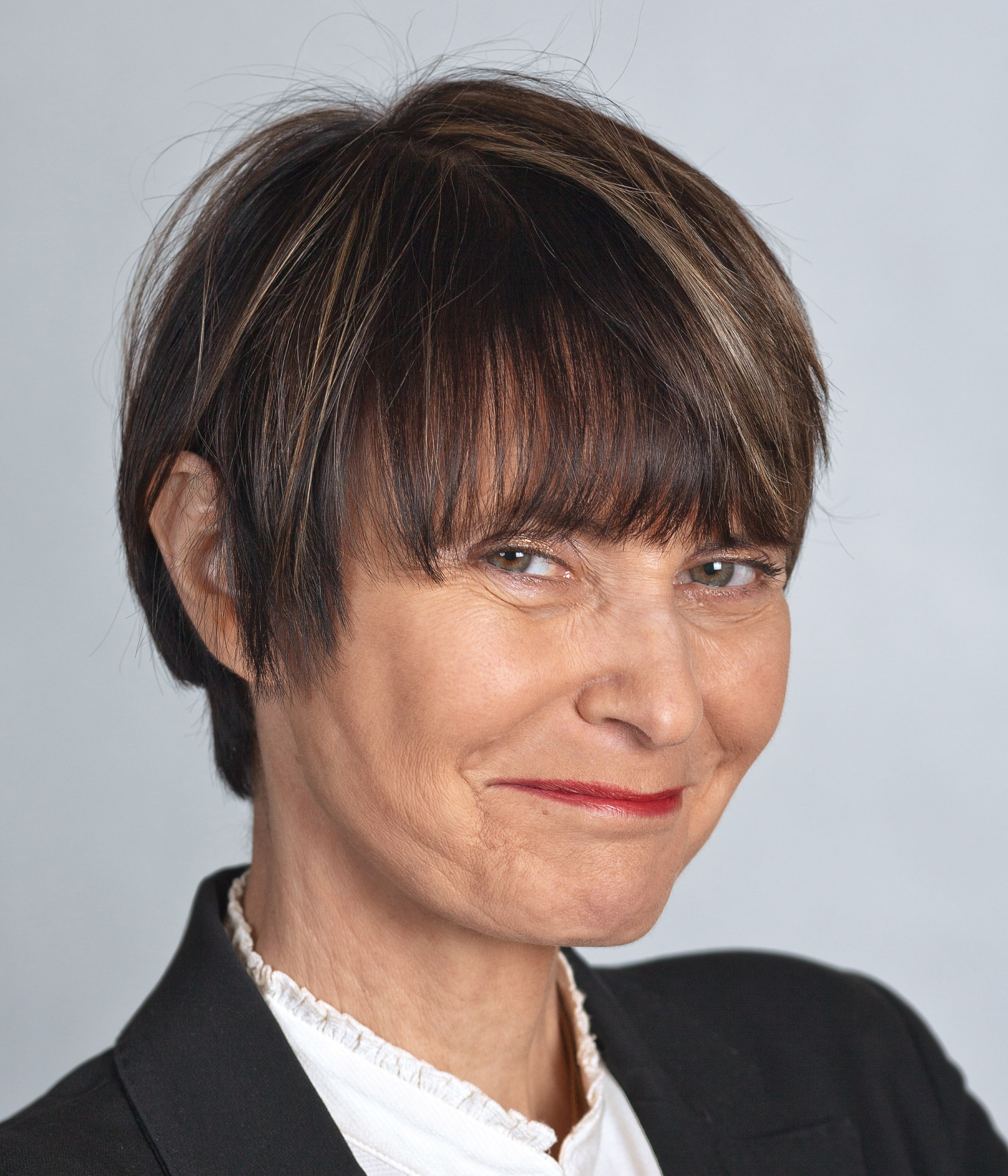
- Official portrait, 2011

President of Switzerland
- In office 1 January 2011 – 31 December 2011
- Vice President: Eveline Widmer-Schlumpf
- Preceded by: Doris Leuthard
- Succeeded by: Eveline Widmer-Schlumpf
- In office 1 January 2007 – 31 December 2007
- Vice President: Pascal Couchepin
- Preceded by: Moritz Leuenberger
- Succeeded by: Pascal Couchepin

Vice President of Switzerland
- In office 1 November 2010 – 31 December 2010
- President: Doris Leuthard
- Preceded by: Moritz Leuenberger
- Succeeded by: Eveline Widmer-Schlumpf
- In office 1 January 2006 – 31 December 2006
- President: Moritz Leuenberger
- Preceded by: Moritz Leuenberger
- Succeeded by: Pascal Couchepin

Head of the Department of Foreign Affairs
- In office 1 January 2003 – 31 December 2011
- Preceded by: Joseph Deiss
- Succeeded by: Didier Burkhalter

Member of the Swiss Federal Council
- In office 1 January 2003 – 31 December 2011
- Preceded by: Ruth Dreifuss
- Succeeded by: Alain Berset

Personal details
- Born: Micheline Anne-Marie Rey; 8 July 1945 (age 81) Sion, Switzerland
- Party: Social Democratic Party
- Spouse: André Calmy
- Education: Graduate Institute of International Studies

Micheline Anne-Marie Calmy-Rey (French pronunciation: [miʃlin kalmiʁɛ]; née Rey; born 8 July 1945) is a Swiss businesswoman and politician who served as a Member of the Swiss Federal Council from 2003 to 2011. A member of the Social Democratic Party (SP/PS), she was the head of the Federal Department of Foreign Affairs for the whole of her tenure as a Federal Councillor. She was President of the Swiss Confederation twice, in 2007 and 2011.

== Early life and education ==
Calmy-Rey was born Micheline Anne-Marie Rey on 8 July 1945 in Sion, Switzerland, the oldest of three daughters, to Charles Rey, a teacher, and Adeline Rey (née Fournier), into a Catholic family.

She received her diploma in 1963 in Saint-Maurice and a licence degree in political science at the Graduate Institute of International Studies, Geneva, in 1968. While studying she married André Calmy; they have two children.

== Career ==
Calmy-Rey established a small enterprise in the book distribution business. From 1981 to 1997 Calmy-Rey served as a representative in the Grand Conseil of the canton of Geneva as a member of the Social Democratic Party (PSS/SPS), and was president of the assembly during 1992–1993. She was president of the Geneva section of the party from 1986 to 1990 and again from 1993 to 1997. In 1997, Calmy-Rey was elected to the Conseil d'Etat of Geneva. In 2001, she became head of the finance department and president of the Conseil d'Etat of the canton.

She was elected on 4 December 2002 to the Federal Council, heading the Federal Department of Foreign Affairs from 2003 to 2011. Calmy-Rey is the fourth woman elected to the Federal Council in history. She was also elected Vice-President of Switzerland, a post she held for the calendar year of 2006 and the calendar year of 2010.

Calmy-Rey supports Switzerland joining the European Union and she is an Eminent Member of the Sergio Vieira de Mello Foundation. The project SAFFA 2020 is also under her patronage and of the councillors (Bundesrat) Doris Leuthard, Simonetta Sommaruga and Eveline Widmer-Schlumpf.

Since 2016, Calmy-Rey has been a member of the board of the Global Leadership Foundation (chaired by Helen Clark), an organisation that works to support democratic leadership, prevent and resolve conflict through mediation and promote good governance in the form of democratic institutions, open markets, human rights and the rule of law. It does so by making available, discreetly and in confidence, the experience of former leaders to today's national leaders. It is a not-for-profit organisation composed of former heads of government, senior governmental and international organization officials who work closely with heads of government on governance-related issues of concern to them.

She is a member of the board Geneva of GESDA (Geneva Science and Diplomacy Anticipator).

== Presidency ==
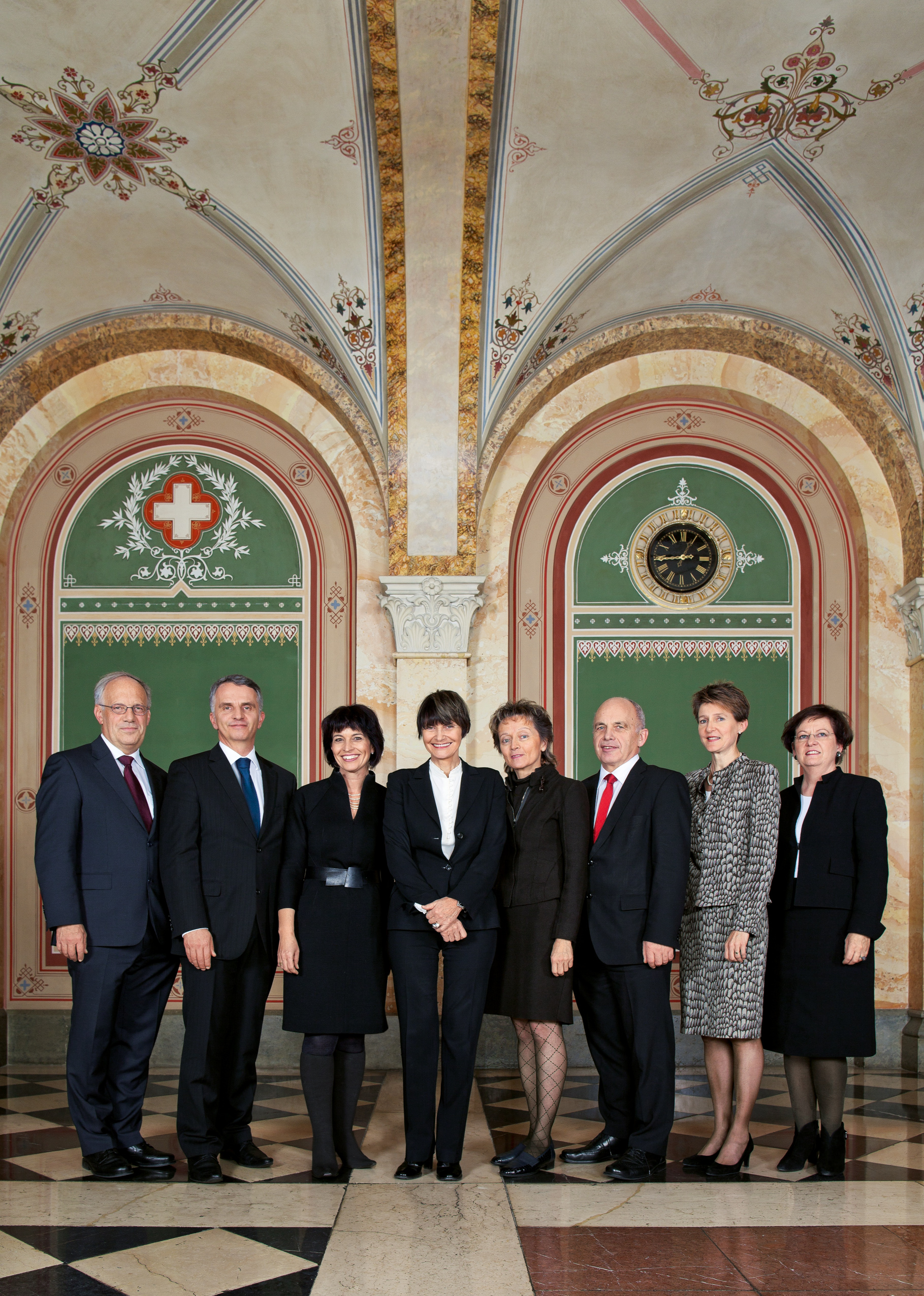
2011 Swiss Federal Council

On 1 January 2007, Calmy-Rey became the second female president of the Confederation in history, the first having been her predecessor on the Federal Council, Ruth Dreifuss. She was elected as president on 13 December 2006 by 147 votes. However, by Swiss tradition, it was a foregone conclusion she would be elected. She had been the longest-serving councillor not to have been president, and had served as vice-president for 2006.

As President of the Confederation, she presided over meetings of the Federal Council and carried out certain representative functions that would normally be handled by a head of state in other democracies, (though in Switzerland, the Federal Council as a whole is regarded as the head of state). She was also the highest-ranking official in the Swiss order of precedence, and had the power to act on behalf of the whole Council in emergency situations. However, in most cases she was merely prima inter pares, with no power above and beyond her six colleagues.

She had already handled most official visits abroad since being elected to the Federal Council; the head of the Department of Foreign Affairs traditionally carries out such visits.

Calmy-Rey was chosen as vice president for 2010, serving alongside Doris Leuthard. On 8 December 2010, she was chosen, for the second time, as president for 2011 (by 106 votes out of 189, this being the smallest margin in Swiss history) – the first time two women held the post in succession.

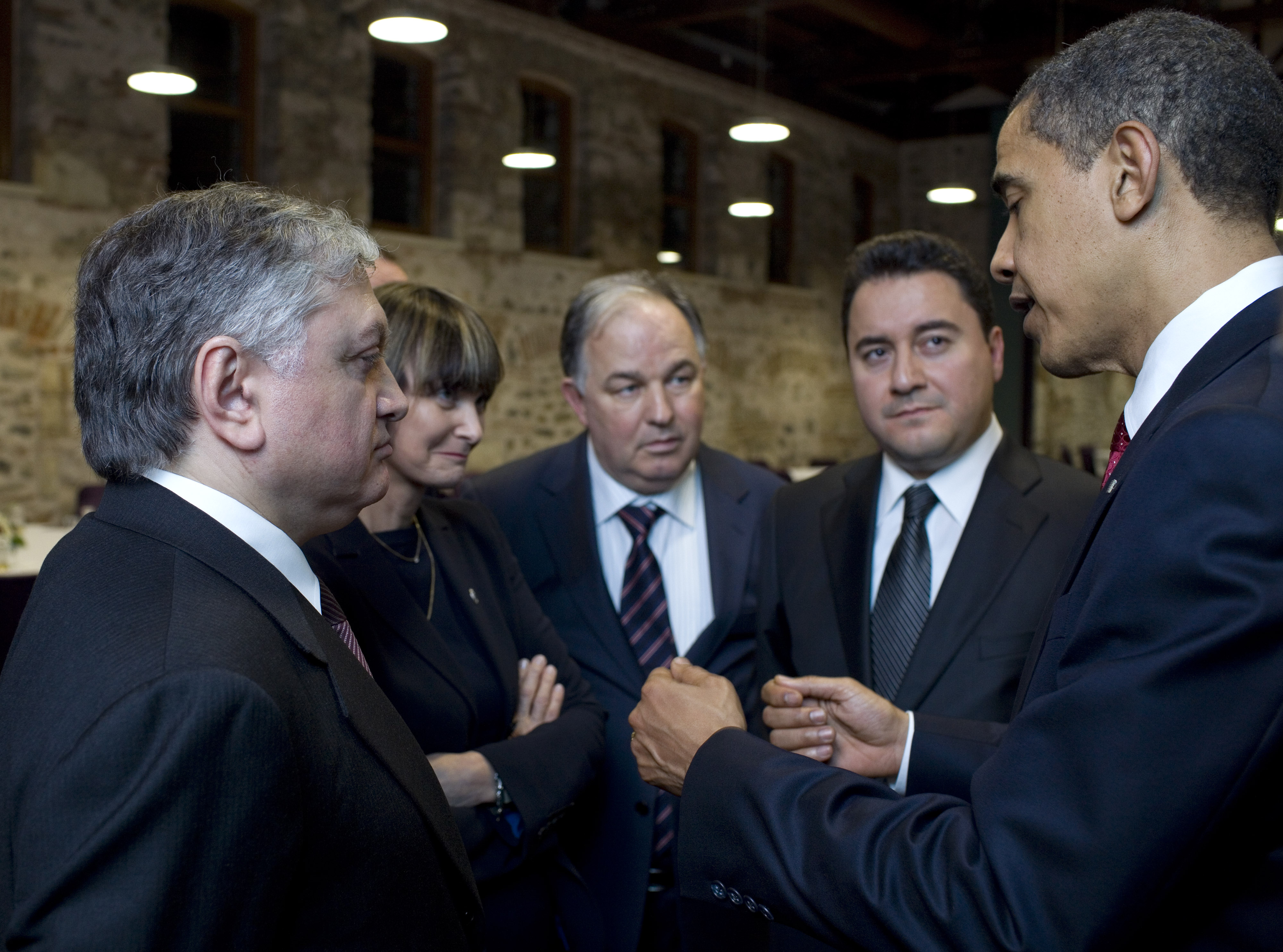
Calmy-Rey speaks to United States President Barack Obama, along with Turkish and Armenian foreign ministers.

Calmy-Rey is a member of the Council of Women World Leaders, an International network of current and former women presidents and prime ministers whose mission is to mobilize the highest-level women leaders globally for collective action on issues of critical importance to women and equitable development.

She announced in September 2011 that she would resign from the government in the following December.

From 2012 to 2013, Calmy-Rey was a member of the High-Level Advisory Council of the President of the 67th Session of the United Nations General Assembly, Serbia's then foreign minister Vuk Jeremić.

== Political views ==
Calmy-Rey is a member of the Socialist party of Switzerland and positions herself as pro-European. In February 2014 she stated that Switzerland should join the European Union to be included in the European political agenda on the continent. In 2016, she expressed concerns about the Brexit impact on the European sovereignty, but recommended that Switzerland opened up to Great Britain as the two countries now faced the same configuration towards the European political power.

In February 2020, Calmy-Rey joined around fifty former European prime ministers and foreign ministers in signing an open letter published by British newspaper The Guardian to condemn U.S. President Donald Trump’s Middle East peace plan, saying it would create an apartheid-like situation in occupied Palestinian territory.

== Academic career ==
In May 2012 Calmy-Rey was appointed as invited professor et the University of Geneva (Global studies institute).

== Other assignments ==
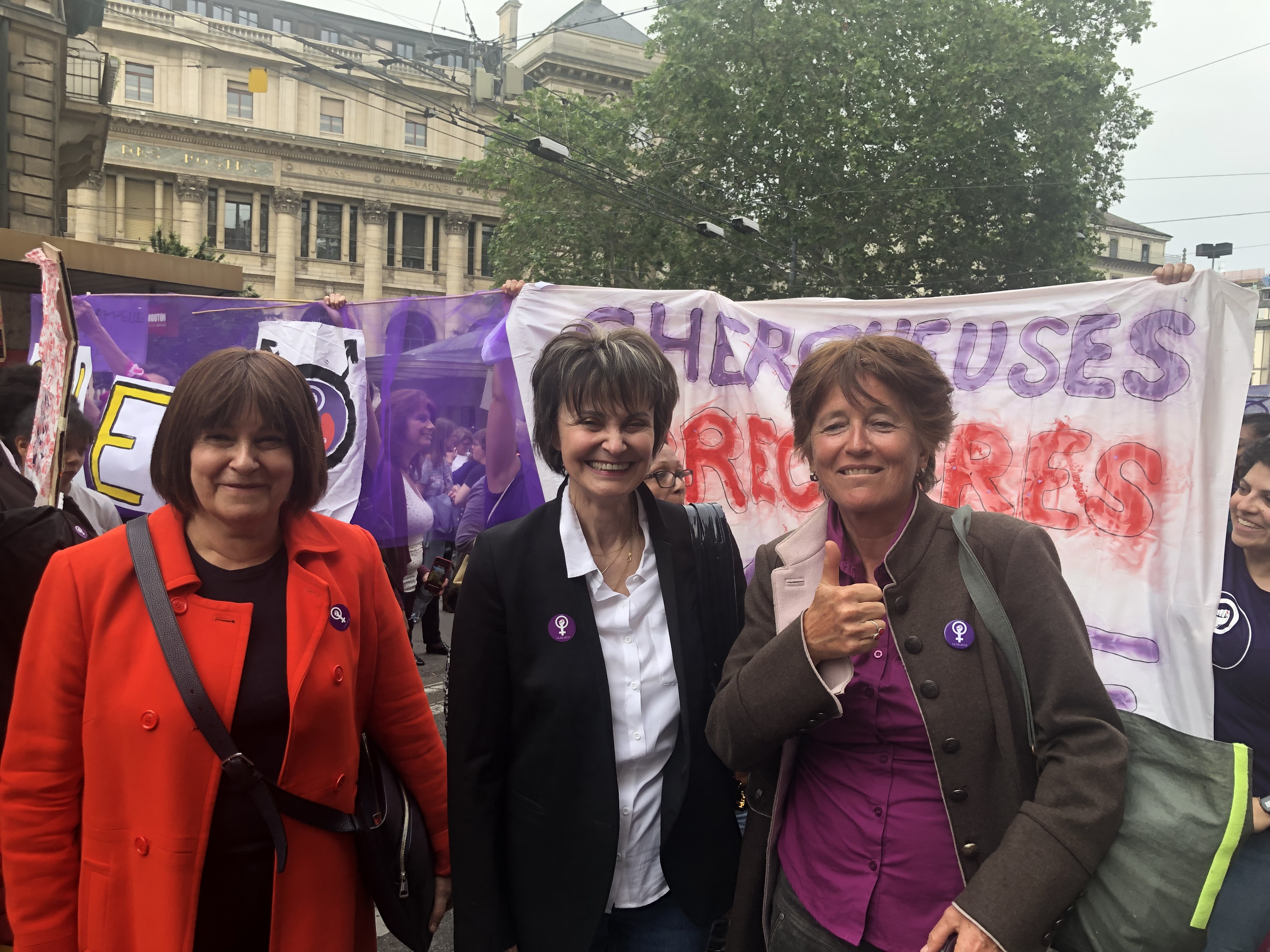
Micheline Calmy-Rey at the feminist Women's march June 14, 2019 in Geneva.

- Member of the United Nations High-Level Panel on Global Sustainability. A report of the panel was published in February 2012.
- Member of the United Nations High-Level Panel on Global Response to Health Crisis . A report was published in January 2016.
- Member of the council of the Global Leadership Foundation (GLF).
- Membre du conseil de la fondation GESDA (Geneva Science and Diplomacy Anticipator).

== Awards ==
- 2011: Prix Diaspora for her role in the recognition of Kosovo independence
- 2012: Medal of honour of Armenia
- 2012: Docteur honoris causa of the International University in Geneva
- 2014: Badge of the Order of Friendship in recognition of her contribution in the reinforcing of the friendship and cooperation between Russia and Switzerland.
- 2017: Citizen of honour of the city of Viti, Kosovo.

== Controversy ==
According to the BBC, Calmy-Rey was "widely criticised" for putting on a headscarf to meet Iranian President Mahmoud Ahmadinejad on 19 March 2008, even though it was acknowledged that she was simply following proper social protocol. While Socialist MP Liliane Maury Pasquier agreed that the Swiss representant had to respect foreign protocols, this sparked a negative remark from Socialist MP Maria Roth-Bernasconi. In response, Calmy-Rey stated that she was following protocol out of respect, and that had she not done so, she would not have been able to attend the meeting, which has been widely acknowledged.

Calmy-Rey also prompted controversy by attending the signing of a multibillion-dollar natural gas deal of a Swiss energy supply company with Iran. The United States had complained that Switzerland was sending the wrong message when Tehran was subject to UN sanctions. Calmy-Rey pointed out that gas exports were not subject to the UN sanctions. Both the Israeli government and international Jewish groups such as the World Jewish Congress strongly criticised the deal.

== Personal life ==
In 1966, Calmy-Rey married Romanian-born André Calmy (né Andrei Calmy; 1941–2015), a book wholesaler, who was Romanian Jewish originally from Bucharest. He came to Switzerland with his mother in 1952. They have two children;

- Alexandra Calmy (born 1969), an infectious disease specialist, who currently serves as co-chair of the World Health Organization's Infectious Diseases Division at the Geneva University Hospitals.
- Raphaël Calmy (born 1974), an author

Calmy-Rey currently resides in Geneva, Switzerland.

== Publications ==
- « The Art and Science of Negotiations : "De–Politicizing and Technicizing Negotiations", in WTO Accessions - The Upper Floors of the Trading System, WTO & Cambridge University Press (in Druck).
- « Doktrin in globalen Kontext », in Konrad Hummler et Franz Jaeger, Kleinstaat Schweiz – Auslauf- oder Erfolgsmodell?, Zürich, NZZ Libro, 2017
- Die Schweiz, die ich uns wünsche. Übersetzt aus dem Französischen von Irma Wehrli, mit einem Vorwort von Charles Lewinsky. Nagel & Kimche, Zürich 2014, ISBN 978-3-312-00610-6.
- La Suisse que je souhaite. Lausanne, Éditions Favre, 2014
- « The Swiss Model », Horizons, Autumn 2014
- « Justice sociale et liberté politique selon Calvin : clarification et perspectives », La Vie Protestante, Genève 2010

Political offices
Preceded by Ruth Dreifuss	Member of the Swiss Federal Council; 2003–2011	Succeeded by Alain Berset
Preceded by Joseph Deiss	Head of the Department of Foreign Affairs; 2003–2011	Succeeded by Didier Burkhalter
Preceded by Moritz Leuenberger	Vice President of Switzerland; 2006	Succeeded by Pascal Couchepin
Preceded by Moritz Leuenberger	President of Switzerland; 2007	Succeeded by Pascal Couchepin
Preceded by Moritz Leuenberger	Vice President of Switzerland; 2010	Succeeded by Eveline Widmer-Schlumpf
Preceded by Doris Leuthard	President of Switzerland; 2011	Succeeded by Eveline Widmer-Schlumpf
