= Pascal Couchepin =

Swiss Federal Councillor from 1998 to 2009

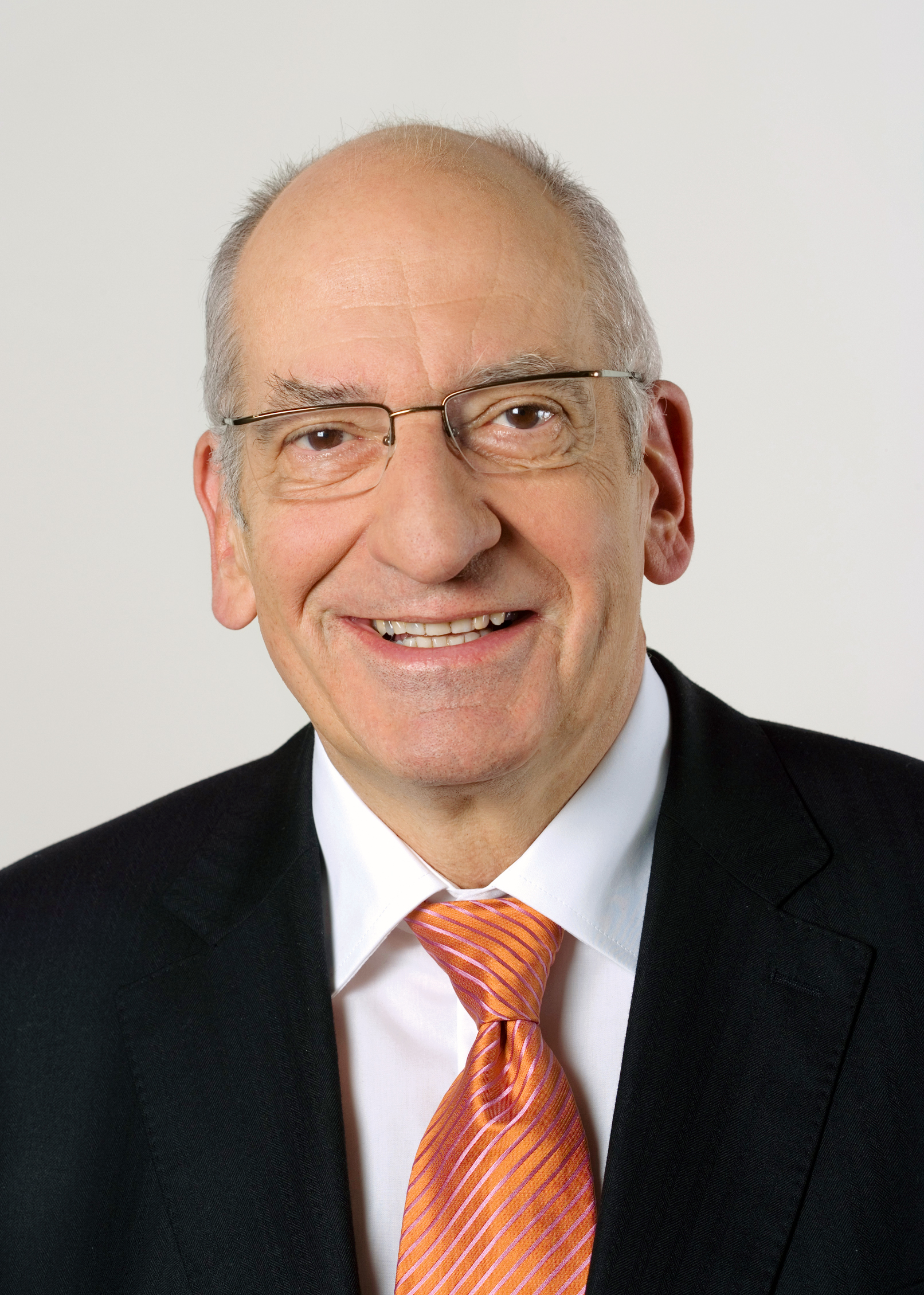

President of Switzerland
- In office 1 January 2008 – 31 December 2008
- Vice President: Hans-Rudolf Merz
- Preceded by: Micheline Calmy-Rey
- Succeeded by: Hans-Rudolf Merz
- In office 1 January 2003 – 31 December 2003
- Vice President: Ruth Metzler
- Preceded by: Kaspar Villiger
- Succeeded by: Joseph Deiss

Vice President of Switzerland
- In office 1 January 2007 – 31 December 2007
- President: Micheline Calmy-Rey
- Preceded by: Micheline Calmy-Rey
- Succeeded by: Hans-Rudolf Merz
- In office 1 January 2002 – 31 December 2002
- President: Kaspar Villiger
- Preceded by: Kaspar Villiger
- Succeeded by: Ruth Metzler

Head of the Department of Home Affairs
- In office 1 January 2003 – 1 November 2009
- Preceded by: Ruth Dreifuss
- Succeeded by: Didier Burkhalter

Head of the Department of Economic Affairs
- In office 1 January 1998 – 31 December 2002
- Preceded by: Jean-Pascal Delamuraz
- Succeeded by: Joseph Deiss

Member of the Swiss Federal Council
- In office 1 January 1998 – 1 November 2009
- Preceded by: Jean-Pascal Delamuraz
- Succeeded by: Didier Burkhalter

Personal details
- Born: 5 April 1942 (age 84) Martigny, Switzerland
- Party: Free Democratic Party
- Spouse: Brigitte Rendu
- Children: 3
- Education: University of Lausanne
- Profession: Lawyer

Pascal Couchepin (French pronunciation: [paskal kuʃpɛ̃]; born 5 April 1942) is a Swiss politician who served as a Member of the Swiss Federal Council from 1998 to 2009. A member of the Free Democratic Party (FDP/PRD), he was President of the Swiss Confederation twice, in 2003 and 2008. Couchepin headed the Federal Department of Economic Affairs from 1998 to 2002 and Federal Department of Home Affairs from 2003 until 2009.

== Biography ==
Couchepin holds a DEA degree in law from the University of Lausanne. He is a father of three (two daughters and a son).

From 1972 to 1976, he was editor-in-chief of the Valais newspaper Le Confédéré.

He was elected to the Swiss Federal Council on 11 March 1998 as a member of the Free Democratic Party of Switzerland from the canton of Valais. Previously, he had been Deputy Mayor (1976) and Mayor of Martigny (from 1984), as well as elected to the National Council from 1979 to 1998.

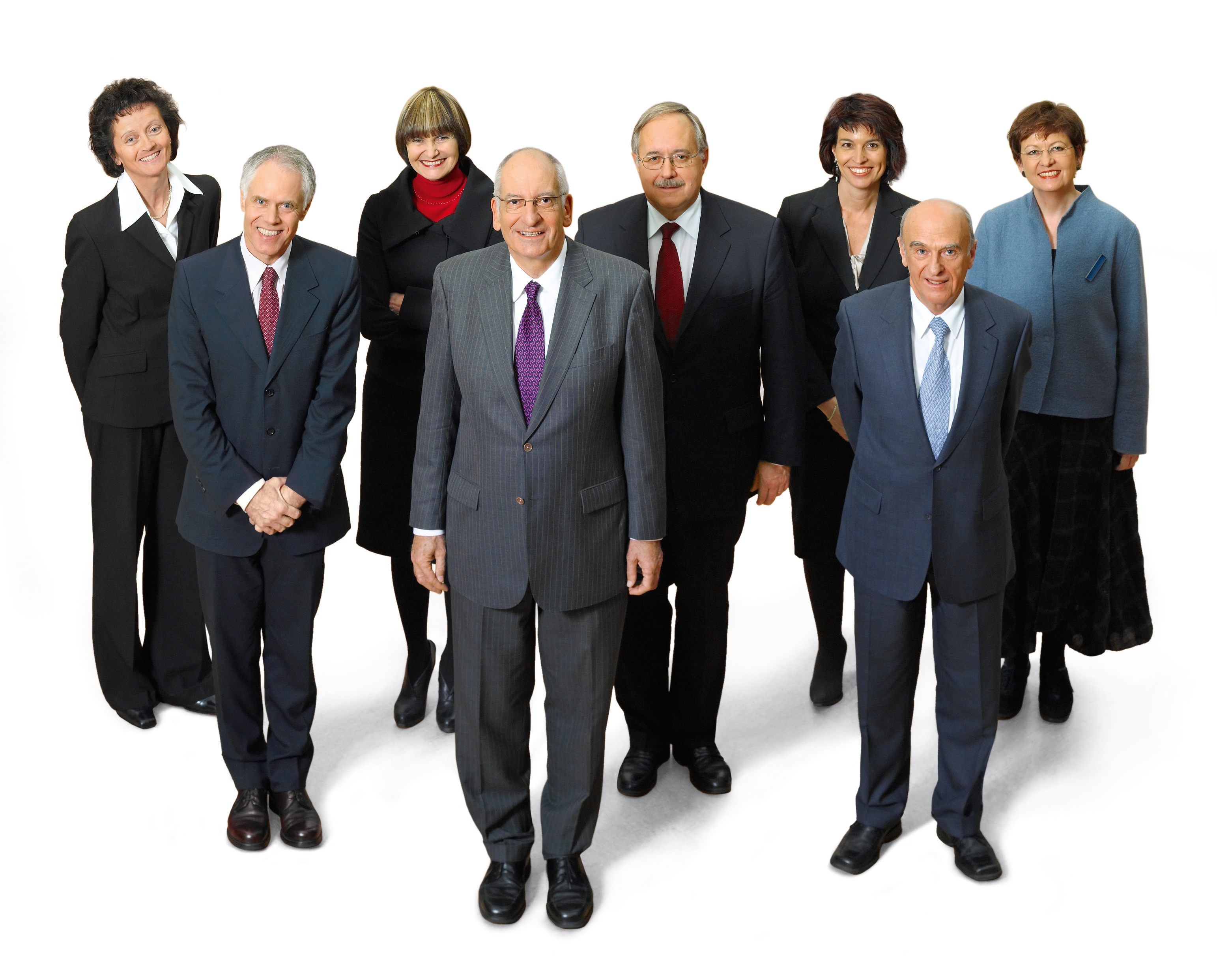
2008 Swiss Federal Council

In 1998 he took over the Federal Department of Economic Affairs, in which position he fought against the government contributing any money to the $1.25 billion settlement between Swiss banks and Holocaust survivors. He was quoted as saying that "there is no reason for the Swiss Government to pay anything", as a government commission had shown "we did what was possible in the hard times of the war." In 2003 he moved to the Federal Department of Home Affairs. He was the President of the Confederation in 2003. On 13 December 2006, he was elected vice president of the Federal Council for 2007; on 12 December 2007 was elected President of the Confederation for 2008.

During the Pope Benedict XVI Islam controversy, also known as the 2006 Regensburg lecture, he stated the Pope's speech was "intelligent and necessary." On 12 June 2009, Couchepin announced his resignation from the Federal Council effective 31 October 2009. This led to an election to fill his vacated seat.

Pascal Couchepin is a member of the Global Leadership Foundation, an organisation which works to support democratic leadership, prevent and resolve conflict through mediation and promote good governance in the form of democratic institutions, open markets, human rights and the rule of law. It does so by making available, discreetly and in confidence, the experience of former leaders to today's national leaders. It is a not-for-profit organisation composed of former heads of government, senior governmental and international organisation officials who work closely with heads of government on governance-related issues of concern to them.

== See also ==
- Pierre du Bois de Dunilac

Political offices
Preceded by Jean-Pascal Delamuraz	Member of the Swiss Federal Council; 1998–2009	Succeeded by Didier Burkhalter
Preceded by Jean-Pascal Delamuraz	Head of the Department of Economic Affairs; 1998–2002	Succeeded by Joseph Deiss
Preceded by Kaspar Villiger	Vice President of Switzerland; 2002	Succeeded by Ruth Metzler
Preceded by Kaspar Villiger	President of Switzerland; 2003	Succeeded by Joseph Deiss
Preceded by Ruth Dreifuss	Head of the Department of Home Affairs; 2003–2009	Succeeded by Didier Burkhalter
Preceded by Micheline Calmy-Rey	Vice President of Switzerland; 2007	Succeeded by Hans-Rudolf Merz
Preceded by Micheline Calmy-Rey	President of Switzerland; 2008	Succeeded by Hans-Rudolf Merz
