= Flavio Cotti =

Swiss politician (1939–2020)

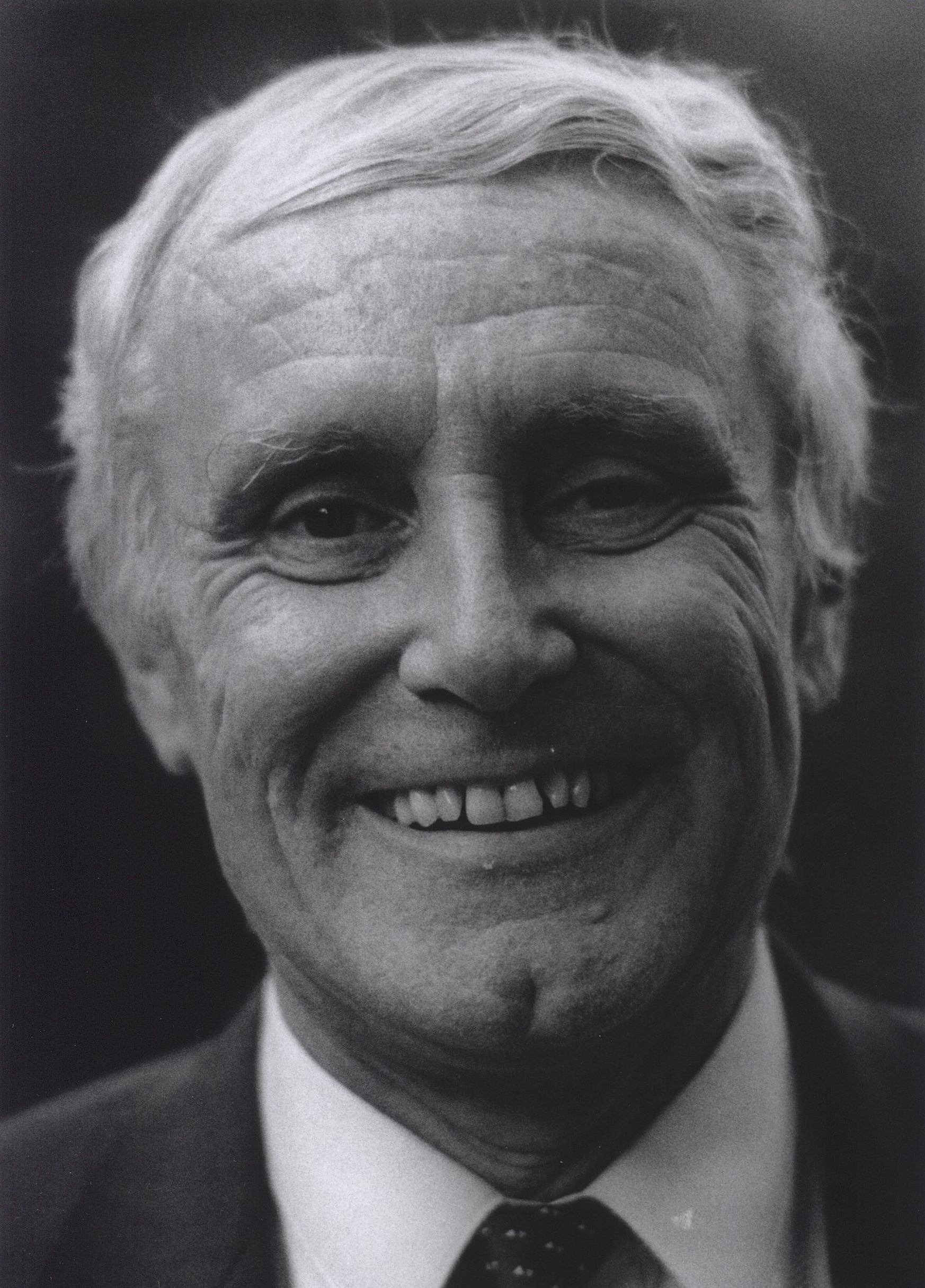
- Cotti in 1997

President of Switzerland
- In office 1 January 1991 – 31 December 1991
- Preceded by: Arnold Koller
- Succeeded by: René Felber
- In office 1 January 1998 – 31 December 1998
- Preceded by: Arnold Koller
- Succeeded by: Ruth Dreifuss

Member of the Swiss Federal Council
- In office 1 January 1987 – 30 April 1999
- Preceded by: Alphons Egli
- Succeeded by: Joseph Deiss

Personal details
- Born: 18 October 1939 Prato-Sornico, Switzerland
- Died: 16 December 2020 (aged 81) Locarno, Switzerland
- Political party: Christian Democratic People's Party

Flavio Cotti (18 October 1939 – 16 December 2020) was a Swiss politician who served as member of the Federal Council from 1986 to 1999. He was a member of the Christian Democratic People's Party from the canton of Ticino. In the 1990s, Cotti led the Swiss government's unsuccessful attempts to further Switzerland's political integration into the European Union. He was President of the Confederation in 1991 and 1998 and headed the departments of Home Affairs and Foreign Affairs.

== Early life and political career ==
Cotti was born in Muralto. After studies of law in Fribourg, he practised law in Locarno and pursued a political career in his native Ticino.

In 1962, he headed the newly founded Partito popolare democratico ticinese. In 1981 he was elected president of the cantonal Christian Democratic Party, and served as president of the national party from 1981 to 1984.

Cotti was a member of the cantonal parliament from 1962 to 1975. He was elected to the cantonal government of Ticino in 1975. In 1983, he was elected to the national parliament's lower house, the National Council.

== Federal Council ==
Cotti was elected to the Federal Council of Switzerland on 10 December 1986, succeeding Alphons Egli, and resigned on 30 April 1999. During his time in office he headed the Federal Department of Home Affairs (1987–1993) and the Federal Department of Foreign Affairs (1994–1999). He was President of the Confederation twice, first in 1991 and then again in 1998.

Cotti's political philosophy was one of optimistic globalism, and he liked to be seen as a visionary and as an homme des lettres. A convinced Europhile, Cotti was instrumental in bringing about the Federal Council's 1992 decision to seek Swiss membership of the European Union – a move that backfired a few months later when Swiss voters rejected membership in the European Economic Area, blocking further Swiss integration with the EU. In this and other areas, Cotti's visions proved incompatible with Switzerland's complicated and slow consensus politics, which earned him the nickname of "minister of announcements" (Ankündigungsminister).

As Switzerland's foreign minister since 1994, Cotti helped salvage Switzerland's relationship with the EU by negotiating and concluding a series of treaties that now govern Swiss–EU relations. He led Swiss negotiations to settle claims of Holocaust survivors against Switzerland and Swiss banks. He was a strong advocate of Switzerland's accession to the United Nations, which voters only agreed to after his time in office in 2002. Cotti also prominently represented the country abroad, gaining international recognition as the first Swiss president of the OSCE.

== Post-ministerial life ==
After retiring from politics, Cotti served in leading advisory positions in major Swiss companies, including on the board of Credit Suisse.

Cotti died from COVID-19 on 16 December 2020, at the age of 81, during the COVID-19 pandemic in Switzerland.

Political offices
| Preceded by Alphons Egli | Member of the Swiss Federal Council; 1986–1999 | Succeeded by Joseph Deiss |
