= Arnold Koller =

Swiss politician

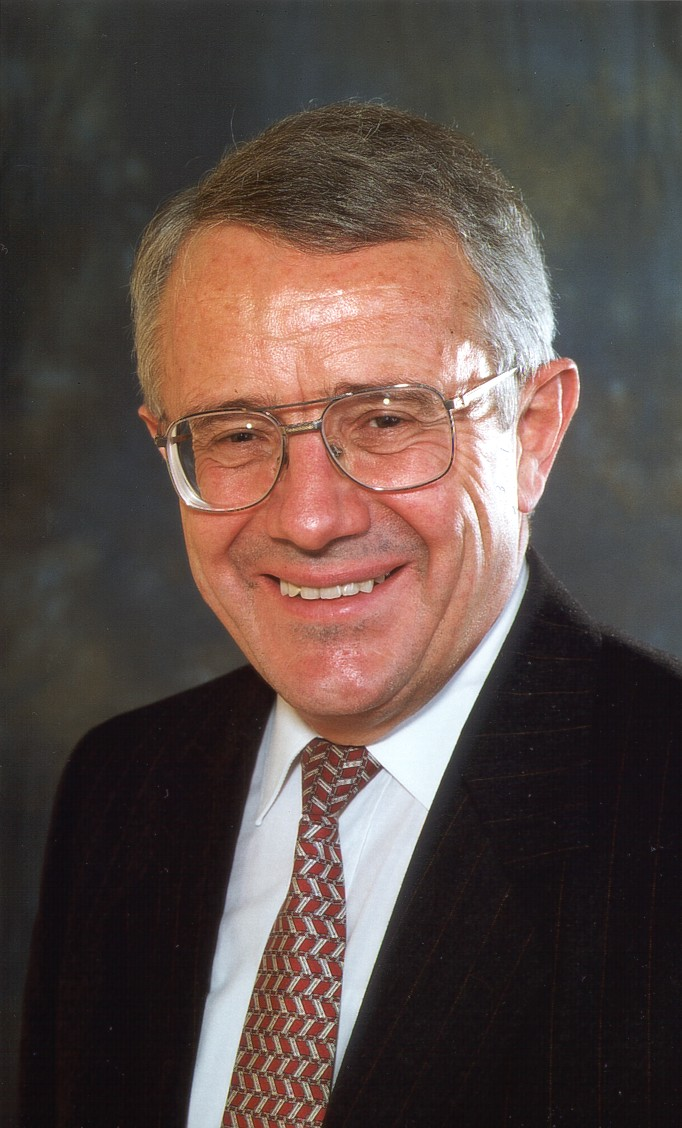

Member of the Federal Council
- In office 1986–1999
- Preceded by: Kurt Furgler
- Succeeded by: Ruth Metzler

President of Switzerland
- In office 1 January 1997 – 31 December 1997
- Preceded by: Jean-Pascal Delamuraz
- Succeeded by: Flavio Cotti
- In office 1 January 1990 – 31 December 1990
- Preceded by: Jean-Pascal Delamuraz
- Succeeded by: Flavio Cotti

Personal details
- Born: Arnold Koller; 29 August 1933 (age 93) St. Gallen, Switzerland
- Party: Christian Democratic People's Party of Switzerland
- Spouse: Erica Brander (m. 1972)
- Children: 2
- Education: University of St. Gallen (Licentiate); University of Fribourg (Licentiate); University of Fribourg (PhD)

Arnold Koller (/kɒllər/; koll-ər born 29 August 1933) is a Swiss professor and politician. He served as a member of the Federal Council from 1987 to 1999 for the Christian Democratic People's Party (CVP). Koller previously served as a member of the National Council from 1971 to 1986. He did also serve two terms of the as President of the Swiss Confederation in 1990 and 1997. He is primarily known for Lex Koller, a Swiss Federal Act on Acquisitions of Real Estate by Persons Abroad, which he initiated.

== Early life and education ==
Koller was born 29 August 1933 in St. Gallen, Switzerland, the oldest of five children, to Alois Arnold Koller and Genoveva (née Brülisauer). His father was an organist and elementary school teacher while his mother was a homemaker. He attended schools in Appenzell. Until 1957, Koller studied Economics in St. Gallen and then until 1959 Jurisprudence at the University of Fribourg and the University of California, Berkeley. He received a Licentiate degree in both majors. His doctoral dissertation and habilitation from the University of Fribourg were respectively accepted in 1966 and 1971.

== Career ==
In 1960, Koller was admitted to the Bar of Appenzell Innerrhoden. He initially worked as a counsel in the legal department of PTT and from 1964 to 1966 in the Secretary of the Swiss Cartel Commission. Since completing his doctorate, he has worked as university professor and lecturer for Economics and Jurisprudence.

== Politics ==
He was elected to the Federal Council on 10 December 1986 as a member of the Christian Democratic People's Party of Switzerland from the canton of Appenzell Innerrhoden. He handed over office on 30 April 1999.

During his time in office he held the following departments:

- Federal Military Department (1987–1988)
- Federal Department of Justice and Police (1989)
- Federal Military Department (1989)
- Federal Department of Justice and Police (1990–1999)

He was President of the Confederation twice in 1990 and 1997.

Arnold Koller was Chairman of the Board of the Second International Conference on Federalism held in St. Gallen in 2002. The conference was organised based on the Governmental Learning Spiral, a method to design problem-solving events in politics. The conference background papers, proceedings and plenary speeches as well as the method are described in the book "Federalism in a Changing World – Learning from Each Other", which he edited together with Raoul Blindenbacher.

From 2006 to 2010 Arnold Koller was the Chair of the Forum of Federations. This is an international organisation designed to help develop best practices in countries around the world with federal and devolved systems of government.

== Personal life ==
In 1972, he married Erica Brander, then a flight attendant for Swissair. They have two daughters. Koller became an honorary citizen of Gossau in 2011.

== Selected publications ==
- Blindenbacher, R. and Koller, A. (eds): Federalism in a Changing World – Learning from Each Other. Background Papers, Proceedings and Plenary Speeches of the International Conference on Federalism 2002. Montreal: McGill-Queens University Press, 2003.

- Koller, A., Thürer, D. and Dafflon, B.: Principles of Federalism. Guidelines for Good Federal Practices – A Swiss Contribution. Zurich: Dike Verlag, 2012.

- Koller, A.: Aus der Werkstatt eines Bundesrates. Bern: Stämpfli Verlag, 2014

== See also ==
- Lex Koller

Political offices
Preceded by André Gautier	President of the Swiss National Council; 1984/1985	Succeeded by Martin Bundi
Preceded by Kurt Furgler	Member of the Swiss Federal Council; 1986–1999	Succeeded by Ruth Metzler
