= Jean-Pascal Delamuraz =

Swiss politician

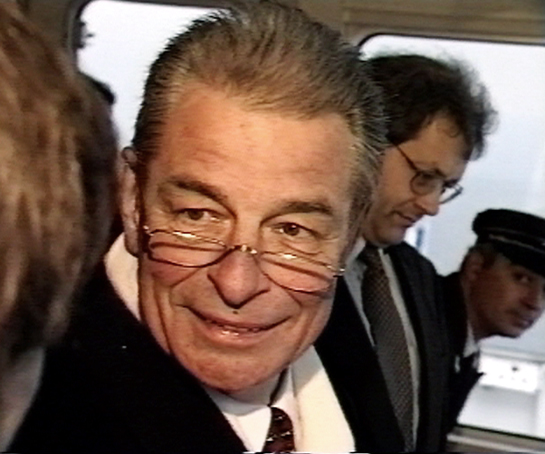
Jean-Pascal Delamuraz

Jean-Pascal Delamuraz (1 April 1936, in Vevey – 4 October 1998 in Lausanne) was a Swiss politician and member of the Swiss Federal Council (1983–1998).

He obtained a degree in political science in 1960 from the University of Lausanne and became that same year deputy director of the Swiss National Exhibition (Expo 64). He was a member of the Lausanne City Parliament for ten years (1960–70). In 1970, he was elected to the Municipal Council in charge of Public works.

After the election of Georges-André Chevallaz to the Federal Council, Delamuraz was appointed Mayor of Lausanne, and from 1981 to 1983 was a member of the Government of the Canton of Vaud in charge of the Department of Agriculture, Industry and Trade. He belonged to the National Council from 1975 until 1983, and was for two years chairman of the control committee. He fought for Switzerland's membership of the European Economic Area and of the World Trade Organization, and played a decisive role in shaping the new Swiss agricultural policy.

Delamuraz was elected to the Swiss Federal Council on 7 December 1983 and handed over office on 30 March 1998. He was affiliated to the Free Democratic Party and served as secretary general of its Vaud (cantonal) section. He started the bilateral negotiations that led to the adoption of seven agreements with the European Union.

During his time in office he held the following departments:

- Federal Military Department (1984–1986)
- Federal Department of Economic Affairs (1987–1998)

He was also President of the Confederation twice, in 1989 and 1996.

Delamuraz was elected honorary president of the New Swiss European Movement (Nomes).

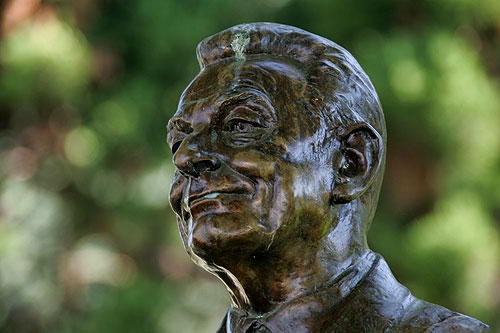
A statue of Delamuraz in Lausanne.

He died a few months after his resignation leaving a widow, Catherine Delamuraz, a son and a daughter.

Political offices
Preceded by Georges-André Chevallaz	Member of the Swiss Federal Council; 1983–1998	Succeeded by Pascal Couchepin
