= Kaspar Villiger =

83rd President of the Swiss Confederation

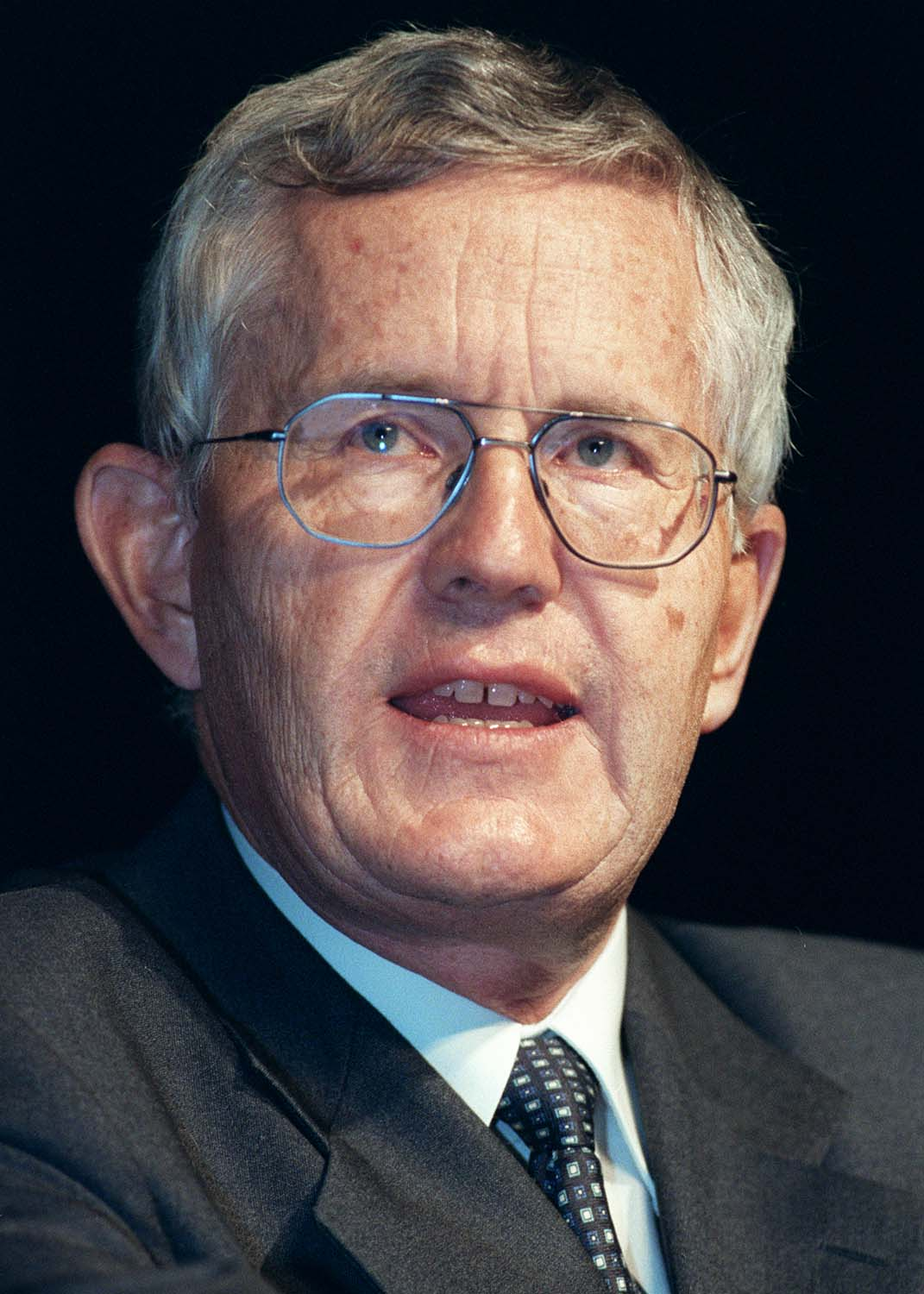
- Villiger in 2002

Member of the Swiss Federal Council
- In office 1 February 1989 – 31 December 2003
- Preceded by: Elisabeth Kopp
- Succeeded by: Hans-Rudolf Merz

President of Switzerland
- In office 1 January 1995 – 31 December 1995
- Vice President: Jean-Pascal Delamuraz
- Preceded by: Otto Stich
- Succeeded by: Jean-Pascal Delamuraz
- In office 1 January 2002 – 31 December 2002
- Vice President: Pascal Couchepin
- Preceded by: Moritz Leuenberger
- Succeeded by: Pascal Couchepin

Minister of the Military
- In office 1 February 1989 – 31 December 1995
- Preceded by: Arnold Koller
- Succeeded by: Adolf Ogi

Minister of Finance
- In office 1 January 1996 – 31 December 2003
- Preceded by: Otto Stich
- Succeeded by: Hans-Rudolf Merz

4th Vice President of Switzerland
- In office 1 January 2001 – 31 December 2001
- President: Moritz Leuenberger
- Preceded by: Moritz Leuenberger
- Succeeded by: Pascal Couchepin

Personal details
- Born: 5 February 1941 (age 85) Pfeffikon, Lucerne, Switzerland
- Party: Free Democratic Party
- Spouse: Vera Preisig (m. 1973)
- Children: 2
- Education: Old Cantonal School Aarau; ETH Zurich
- Profession: Mechanical engineer

Kaspar Villiger (/fiːlɪɡɛr/FEELIGER; born 5 February 1941) is a Swiss businessman, former tobacco manufacturer and politician. He served as a member of the Federal Council (Switzerland) since 1 February 1989 for The Liberals. Villiger served two terms as President of the Swiss Confederation in 1995 and again in 2002. He previously served on the Council of States (Switzerland) from 1987 to 1989 and on the National Council (Switzerland) from 1982 to 1987.

Villiger was best known for his involvement into the Swissair bankruptcy in 2001, when he was among the members of the rescue plan task force, which ultimately failed. Between 2009 and 2012, Villiger was appointed chairman of UBS. He has also served on the board of directors at Nestlé, Swiss Re and Neue Zürcher Zeitung. He currently is the chairman of the UBS Foundation of Economics in Society, which invested 100 million Swiss Francs in the Department of Economics at the University of Zürich. He was a founding member of the Global Leadership Foundation in 2004.

== Early life and education ==
Villiger was born 5 February 1941 in Pfeffikon, Switzerland, the third and youngest child, of Max Villiger (1897–1966), a tobacco manufacturer, and Dora Charlotte "Dory" Villiger (née Heiz; 1909–1997), into a Protestant family. His siblings are; Heinrich Villiger (1930–2025) and Monika Villiger (born 1936).

His paternal family is deeply rooted in the Wyna valley where they have their place of origin in Sins, Aargau. In 1888, his grandfather, a tobacco manufacturer, founded the tobacco concern currently known as Villiger Sons. His father, Max Villiger, emigrated to Louisville, Kentucky in an earlier life, where he reportedly signed a declaration of intention to become a U.S. citizen. However, this was never formalized, and he returned to Switzerland, to work in the family business.

Villiger was predominantly raised in Pfeffikon, Lucerne, in a predominantly Catholic environment. He attended Cantonal School Aarau from 1957 to 1960. He ultimately studied mechanical engineering at the Swiss Federal Institute of Technology in Zürich graduating in 1966.

== Career ==
In 1966, he entered the family business, after the sudden death of his father alongside his elder brother Heinrich Villiger, who was responsible for the German market and his sister Monika Villiger, who was export director. He integrated bicycle manufacturer Kalt in Buttisholz and developed it under the new Villiger name. Villiger was also the vice president of the Chamber of Commerce of Central Switzerland, several years a member on the board committee of the Association of Employers in Central Switzerland and vice president of the Argovian Chamber of Industry and Commerce.

In 2004, he became member of the board of directors of Nestlé and Swiss Re. On 15 April 2009, he was elected Chairman of the Board of Swiss banking giant UBS, holding this post until 3 May 2012. His successor was Axel A. Weber.

== Politics ==
On 1 February 1989, he was elected to the Swiss Federal Council. He is affiliated to the Free Democratic Party (Liberals).

During his time in office he headed the following departments:

- Federal Military Department (1989 – 1995)
- Federal Department of Finance (1996 – 2003)

He was President of the Confederation twice, in 1995 and again in 2002.

In 1995 Kaspar Villiger apologized on occasion of an official visit by Dan Culler who was an internee in the Wauwilermoos internment camp during World War II. Dwight Mears, a U.S. Army officer, covered the apology in his 2012 PhD thesis on the American internees in Switzerland.

In September 2003, he announced he was to resign on 31 December 2003.

== Other activities ==
Kaspar Villiger is a Member of the Global Leadership Foundation, an organization which works to support democratic leadership, prevent and resolve conflict through mediation and promote good governance in the form of democratic institutions, open markets, human rights and the rule of law. It does so by making available, discreetly and in confidence, the experience of former leaders to today's national leaders. It is a not-for-profit organization composed of former heads of government, senior governmental and international organization officials who work closely with Heads of Government on governance-related issues of concern to them.

== Personal life ==
In 1973, Villiger married Vera Preisig, a primary school teacher, with whom he has two daughters.

In 2014, Villiger purchased a condominium at Park Tower Zug, then one of the tallest buildings in Switzerland. Villiger also resides in Muri bei Bern.

Political offices
Preceded by Elisabeth Kopp	Member of the Swiss Federal Council; 1989–2003	Succeeded by Hans-Rudolf Merz
Preceded by Otto Stich	President of Switzerland; 1995	Succeeded by Jean-Pascal Delamuraz
Preceded by Moritz Leuenberger	President of Switzerland; 2002	Succeeded by Pascal Couchepin
