= Moritz Leuenberger =

85th President of the Swiss Confederation

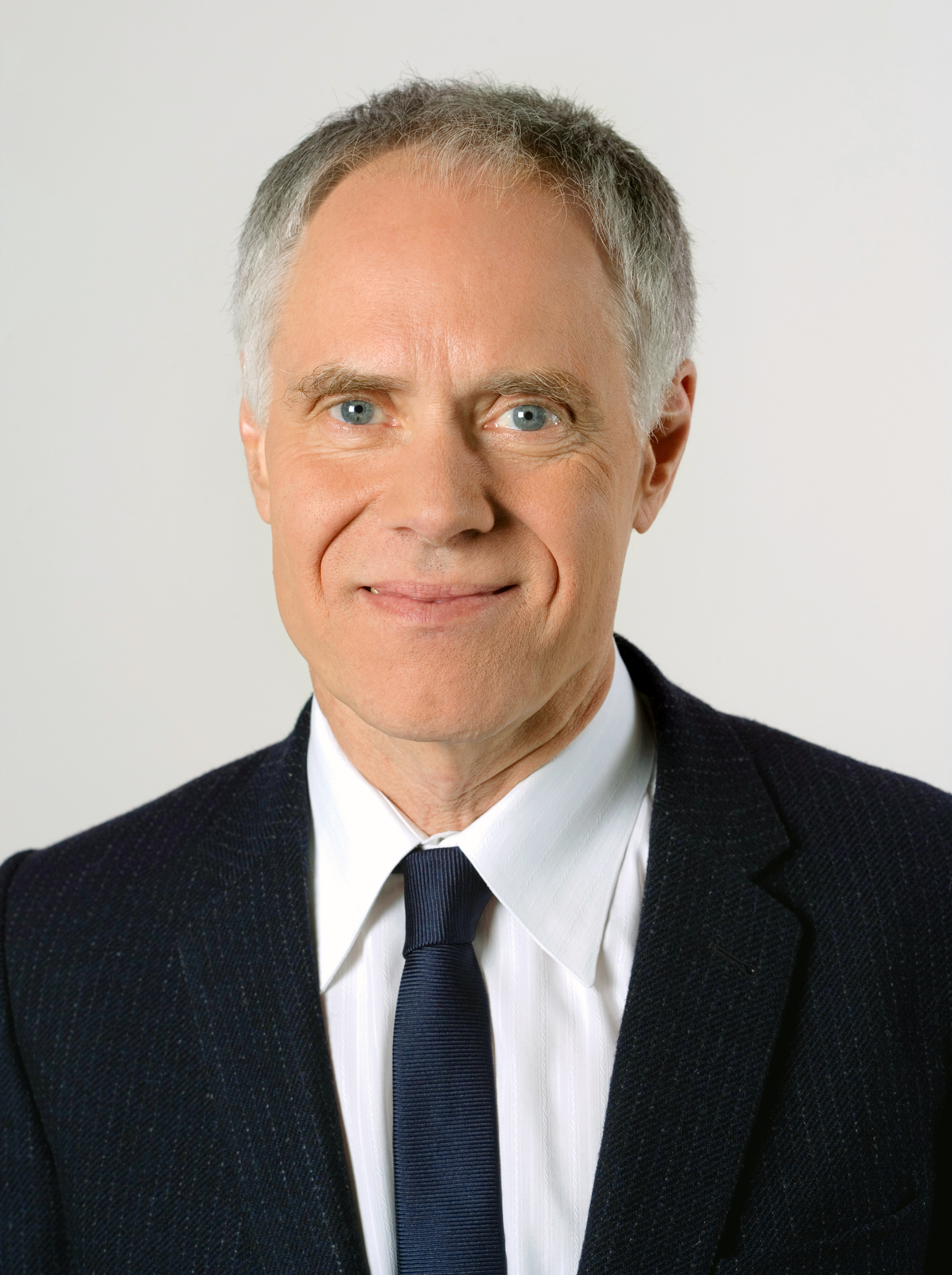

President of Switzerland
- In office 1 January 2006 – 31 December 2006
- Vice President: Micheline Calmy-Rey
- Preceded by: Samuel Schmid
- Succeeded by: Micheline Calmy-Rey
- In office 1 January 2001 – 31 December 2001
- Vice President: Kaspar Villiger
- Preceded by: Adolf Ogi
- Succeeded by: Kaspar Villiger

Vice President of Switzerland
- In office 1 January 2010 – 1 November 2010
- President: Doris Leuthard
- Preceded by: Doris Leuthard
- Succeeded by: Micheline Calmy-Rey
- In office 1 January 2005 – 31 December 2005
- President: Samuel Schmid
- Preceded by: Samuel Schmid
- Succeeded by: Micheline Calmy-Rey
- In office 1 January 2000 – 1 December 2000
- President: Adolf Ogi
- Preceded by: Adolf Ogi
- Succeeded by: Kaspar Villiger

Member of the Swiss Federal Council
- In office 1 January 1995 – 1 November 2010
- Preceded by: Otto Stich
- Succeeded by: Simonetta Sommaruga

Head of the Department of Environment, Transport, Energy and Communications
- In office 1 January 1995 – 1 November 2010
- Preceded by: Adolf Ogi
- Succeeded by: Doris Leuthard

Personal details
- Born: 21 September 1946 (age 80) Biel, Switzerland
- Party: Social Democratic Party
- Spouse: Gret Loewensberg
- Education: University of Zurich

Moritz Leuenberger (born 21 September 1946) is a Swiss politician and lawyer who served as a Member of the Swiss Federal Council from 1995 to 2010. A member of the Social Democratic Party (SP/PS), he was President of the Swiss Confederation in 2001 and 2006. Leuenberger headed the Federal Department of Environment, Transport, Energy and Communications for the whole of his tenure as a Federal Councillor.

== Career ==
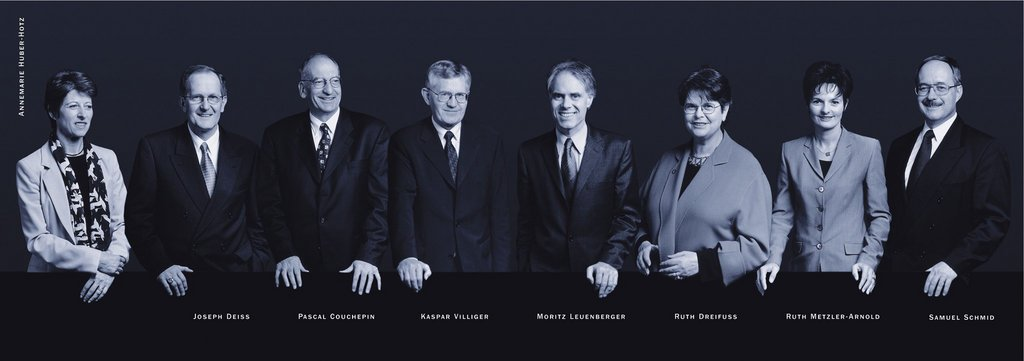
2001 Swiss Federal Council

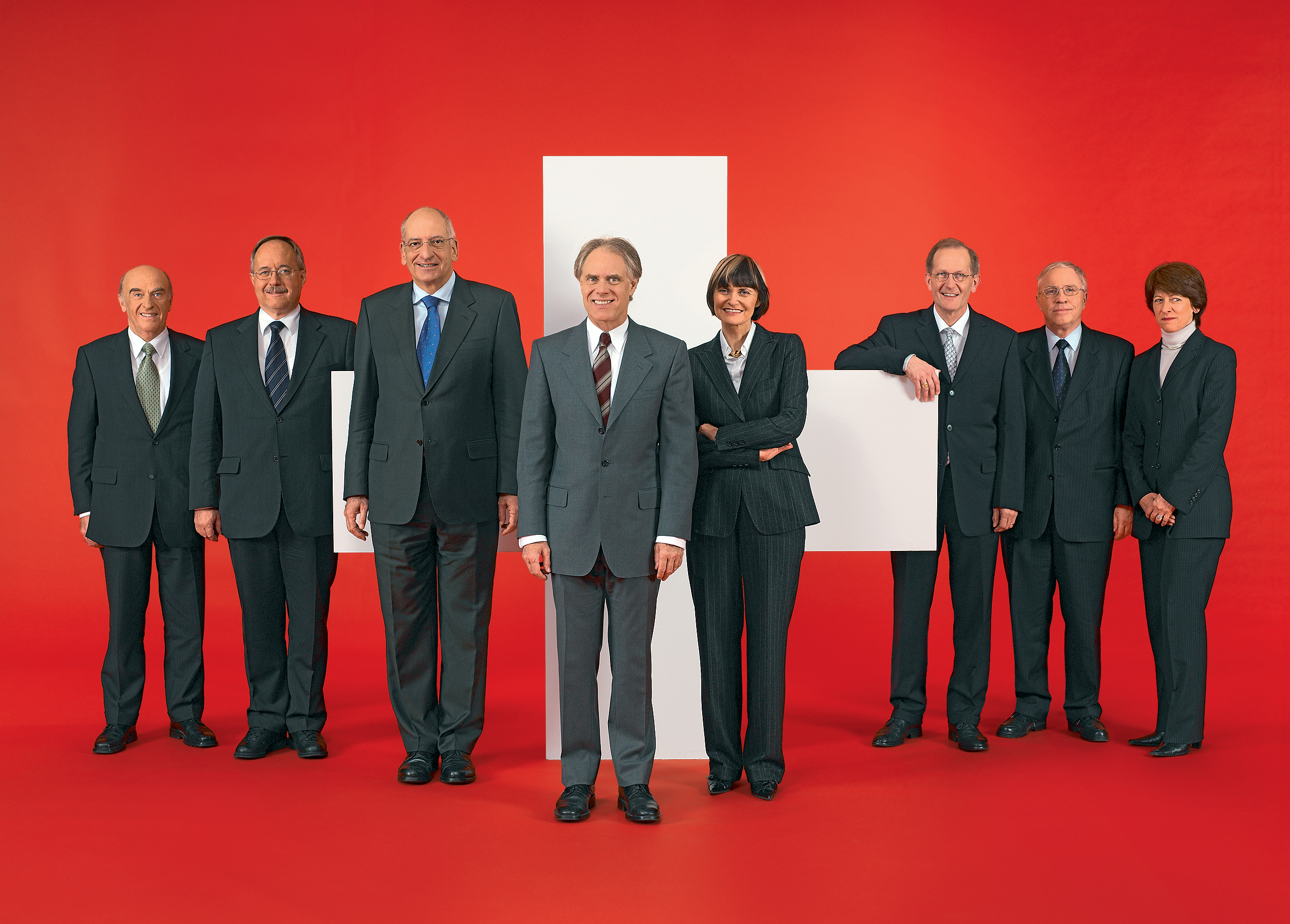
2006 Swiss Federal Council

A lawyer by occupation, Moritz Leuenberger managed his firm in Zürich until 1991. He was successively elected to the Zürich City Council (1974–1983), National Council (1979–1995) and Zürich Cantonal Government (1991–1995), where he headed the Department of Home Affairs and Justice. He presided over Mieterverband, the Swiss tenants' association, from 1972 to 1991.

Leuenberger was elected to the Federal Council on 27 September 1995 as a member of the Social Democratic Party, succeeding Otto Stich. He became head of the Federal Department of Environment, Transport, Energy and Communications; the name of the department was changed in 1998 to incorporate the term "Environment".

At a ceremony in Brussels, the Community of European Railways and Union des Industries Ferroviaires Européennes presented the 2009 European Railway Awards on 20 January 2009. Leuenberger was presented with the Political Award for his work to build and maintain a sustainable transportation policy.

On 9 July 2010, Leuenberger announced he would leave the Federal Council as of 31 December 2010. At this time Hans-Rudolf Merz had been expected to resign as well and there were talks between the two about resigning together. Leuenberger's resignation however came as a surprise. One month later, on 6 August 2010, Merz also announced his resignation for October. This led to the situation that the parliament would have had to elect a new Federal Councillor both in September and November. To avoid this situation, Leuenberger then announced he would change his resignation to allow for just one election for both new Federal Councillors.

== Personal life ==
Moritz Leuenberger is the son of theologian Robert Leuenberger. He has been married to architect Gret Loewensberg since 2003 and has two sons.

== Works ==
- Die Rose und der Stein : Grundwerte in der Tagespolitik: Reden und Texte, Zürich 2002. ISBN 3-85791-399-1
- Träume und Traktanden – Reden und Texte, 6. Aufl., Zürich 2002. ISBN 3-85791-348-7

Political offices
Preceded by Otto Stich	Member of the Swiss Federal Council; 1995–2010	Succeeded by Simonetta Sommaruga
Preceded by Adolf Ogi	President of the Confederation; 2001	Succeeded by Kaspar Villiger
Preceded by Samuel Schmid	President of the Confederation; 2006	Succeeded by Micheline Calmy-Rey
