= Adolf Ogi =

82nd President of the Swiss Confederation

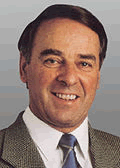
- Official portrait, 2000

Special Adviser to the UN Secretary-General on Sport for Development and Peace
- In office 28 February 2001 – April 2008
- Preceded by: Office established
- Succeeded by: Willi Lemke

President of Switzerland
- In office 1 January 2000 – 31 December 2000
- Preceded by: Ruth Dreifuss
- Succeeded by: Moritz Leuenberger
- In office 1 January 1993 – 31 December 1993
- Preceded by: René Felber
- Succeeded by: Otto Stich

Member of the Swiss Federal Council
- In office 1 January 1988 – 31 December 2000
- Preceded by: Leon Schlumpf
- Succeeded by: Samuel Schmid

Vice President of Switzerland
- In office 1 January 1999 – 31 December 1999
- President: Ruth Dreifuss
- Preceded by: Ruth Dreifuss
- Succeeded by: Moritz Leuenberger

Personal details
- Born: Adolf Ogi; 18 July 1942 (age 84) Kandersteg, Switzerland
- Party: Swiss People's Party
- Spouse: Katharina Marti (m. 1972)
- Children: 2
- Awards: European University (Honorary Doctorate)
- Website: Official website Parliament website

Adolf Ogi (Swiss Standard German: [ˈaːdɔlf ˈoːɡi]; born 18 July 1942) is a Swiss politician who most recently served as Special Advisor to the UN Secretary General on Sport for Development and Peace from 2001 to 2008. He previously served as member of the Federal Council (Switzerland) for the Swiss People's Party from 1987 to 2000. He held the Presidency of the Swiss Confederation twice in 1993 and 2000.

Between 1979 and 1987, Ogi represented the Canton of Bern in the National Council (Switzerland). He was among the rare examples of politicians in the Swiss parliament not having received a traditional tertiary education. Ogi is also known for his significant achievements in the Swiss Olympic Association serving as its president from 2001 to 2008. After leaving federal office he has been an advocate for peace building on a global scale.

== Early life and education ==
Ogi was born 18 July 1942 in Kandersteg, Switzerland in the Bernese Alps, a son of Adolf Ogi, Sr., a forester, mountain guide, skiing teacher and part-time municipal president, and Anna Ogi (née Wenger).

After completion his primary education in Kandersteg, Ogi attended the École du Commerce in La Neuveville from 1958 to 1961 followed by an educational stay in the United Kingdom.

== Political career ==
During his time in office, he was in charge of the following departments:

- Federal Department of Transport, Communications and Energy (1988 – 1995)
- Federal Military Department (from 1996), later named Federal Department of Defence, Civil Protection and Sports (1998 – 2000)

He was President of the Confederation twice in 1993 and 2000.

From 2001 to 2008, Ogi was a Special Adviser on Sport for Development and Peace to the United Nations Secretary-General.

Ogi is today an ambassador for Peace and Sport, a Monaco-based international organization, committed to serving peace in the world through sport.

Ogi was awarded an honorary doctorate by the European University.

Ogi released a biography entitled Dölf Ogi: Statesman and Sportsman.

Ogi received the Gold Olympic Order in the year 2000.

== Personal life ==
In 1972, Ogi married Katharina "Katrin" Marti, a daughter of Hans Marti and Greti Marti (née Messer), innkeepers in Fraubrunnen. They had two children; a son and a daughter;

- Mathias Adolf Ogi (1974-2009), a jurist and attorney, who died aged only 35 from a rare form of throat cancer.
- Caroline Ogi (born 1975), a hotelier and restaurateur in Crans-Montana.

Ogi resides in Geneva, Switzerland.

Political offices
Preceded by Leon Schlumpf	Member of the Swiss Federal Council; 1988 – 2000	Succeeded by Samuel Schmid
