= Ruth Dreifuss =

Swiss politician (born 1940)

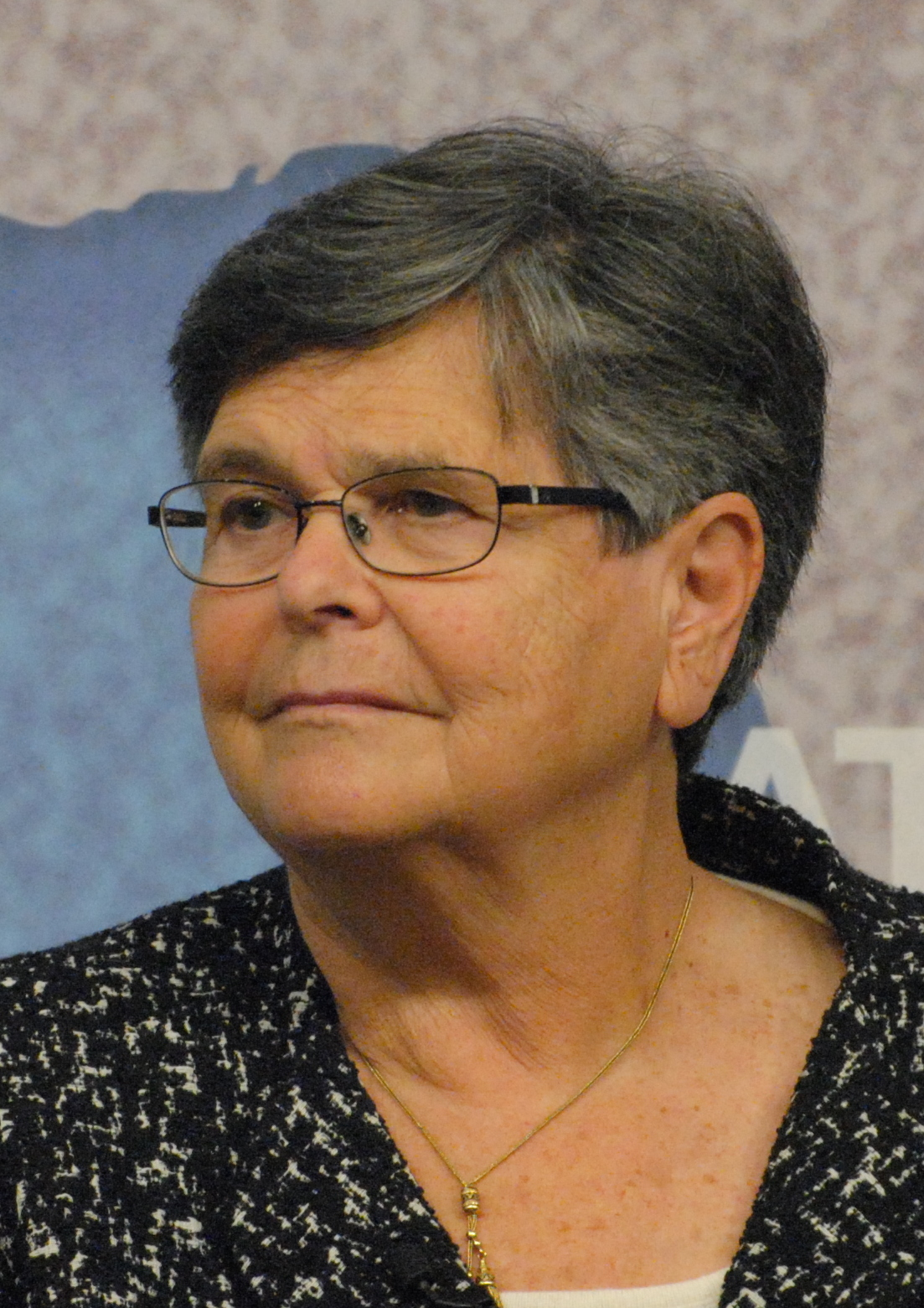
- Dreifuss in 2014

President of Switzerland
- In office 1 January 1999 – 31 December 1999
- Vice President: Adolf Ogi
- Preceded by: Flavio Cotti
- Succeeded by: Adolf Ogi

Vice President of Switzerland
- In office 1 January 1998 – 31 December 1998
- President: Flavio Cotti
- Preceded by: Flavio Cotti
- Succeeded by: Adolf Ogi

Head of the Department of Home Affairs
- In office 10 March 1993 – 31 December 2002
- Preceded by: Flavio Cotti
- Succeeded by: Pascal Couchepin

Member of the Federal Council
- In office 1 April 1993 – 31 December 2002
- Preceded by: René Felber
- Succeeded by: Micheline Calmy-Rey

Personal details
- Born: 9 January 1940 (age 86) St. Gallen, Switzerland
- Party: Social Democratic Party
- Education: University of Geneva

Ruth Dreifuss (born 9 January 1940) is a Swiss economist, unionist and politician who served as a member of the Federal Council from 1993 to 2002. She served as Vice President of Switzerland in 1998 and as President of Switzerland in 1999 for the Social Democratic Party.

== Early life and education ==
Ruth Dreifuss was born 9 January 1940 in St. Gallen, Switzerland, the second of two children, to Sidney Dreifuss (1899–1956), a merchant, and Jeanne "Johanna" (née Bicard; 1905–1962), a secretary. Her elder brother, Jean-Jacques Dreifuss, is a professor emeritus at the University of Geneva. Her paternal family belongs to the oldest Jewish families of Switzerland settled in Endingen. Her maternal family originally hailed from Horbourg-Wihr in Alsace, they became citizens in Boppelsen in 1886. Officially, Dreifuss is non-denominational; however, she considers herself a secular Jew.

In 1945, the family relocated to Geneva, where Dreifuss attended École de Sécheron, since 1947. After secondary school (Rue Necker) she attended a commercial school, completing a general business diploma. In 1958, she started to study social studies at the Haute école de travail social in Geneva, concurrently she attended several courses at the University of Geneva and its then-affiliated Graduate Institute of Development Studies. In 1970, aged 30, she obtained a Master of Arts in Economics from this university.

== Career ==
After business education, Ruth worked as a secretary and social worker. Also, she was a journalist at Cooperation from 1961 to 1964. She joined the Socialist Party (SP) in 1964. Between 1972 and 1981, she was scientific expert at the Federal Swiss Agency for Development and Cooperation. Also, Dreifuss elected Secretary of the Swiss Trade Union, where she dealt with matters related to social insurance, labor law and women's issues, until her election to the Federal Council in 1993.

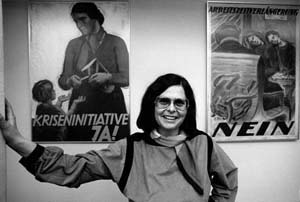
Dreifuss in 1988

Dreifuss was a social-democratic member of the City of Bern's Legislative Assembly from 1989 to 1992. She missed out the election to the National Council of Switzerland in 1991.

She is a member of the Council of Women World Leaders, an International network of current and former female leaders whose mission is to mobilize the highest-level women leaders globally for collective action on issues of critical importance to women and equitable development.

== Election to the Federal Council ==
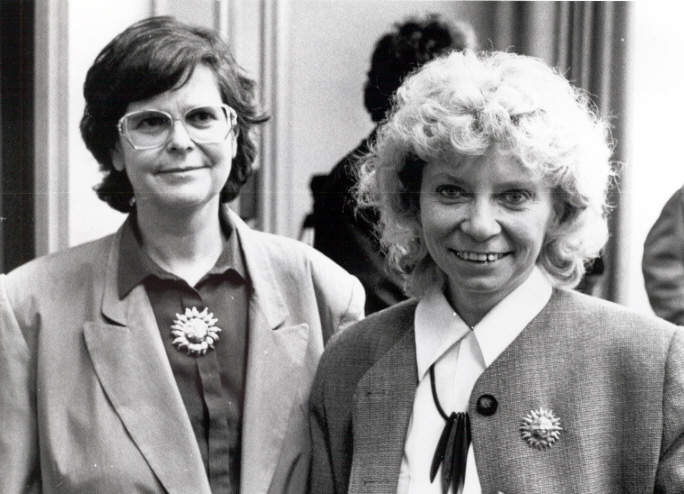
Ruth Dreifuss (left) and Christiane Brunner on 8 March 1993

After the resignation of René Felber from the Federal Council, a member of the Social Democratic Party was supposed to be elected, according to the unofficial "magic formula" used to determine the representation of the Swiss parties at the Federal Council. While Christiane Brunner was the Social Democratic Party's official candidate for the election on 3 March 1993, the right-wing parties decided to back another member of the Social Democratic Party, Francis Matthey, a member of the national parliament and a Minister of the Canton of Neuchâtel at that time who declined election, as his party did not support it.

A new election was organized on 10 March 1993, and the Social Democratic Party presented both Ruth Dreifuss and Christiane Brunner as the two official candidates. It was the first time that two women were on the official "ticket" for election, and Ruth Dreifuss was elected on the 3rd round with 144 votes.

== Political actions undertaken ==
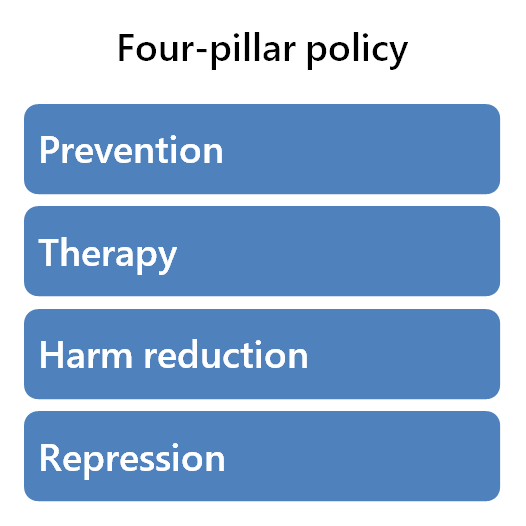
The 4 pillars of Switzerland's drug policy: prevention, treatment, harm reduction and repression.

Ruth Dreifuss held the Federal Department of Home Affairs until her resignation on 31 December 2002. She was the first woman ever to be elected President of the Confederation from 1 January to 31 December 1999.

She won several referendums, including a revision of the Health Insurance Bill, the 10th revision of the social security system, a drug policy based on prevention, therapy, help and rehabilitation, and a new law regarding the film industry and its development. The 4-pillar policy was also aimed at reducing the spread of the AIDS epidemic, especially with a new policy regarding the supply of clean syringes.

She worked on a Maternity Insurance law, but since the majority of the Federal Council rejected the proposal, she had to ask the people to reject her own text, as she had to respect collegiality.

She is a member and former chair of the Global Commission on Drug Policy and a member of International Commission Against the Death Penalty.

== Bibliography ==
- Dreifuss ist unser Name (Dreifuss is our name), by Isabella Maria Fischli, Ed. Pendo, 2002, ISBN 3-85842-487-0.
- "Ruth Dreifuss" in Women of power - half a century of female presidents and prime ministers worldwide, by Torild Skard, Bristol: Policy Press, 2014, ISBN 978-1-44731-578-0.

Political offices
Preceded by René Felber	Member of the Swiss Federal Council; 1993–2002	Succeeded by Micheline Calmy-Rey
Preceded by Flavio Cotti	Minister of Home Affairs; 1993–2002	Succeeded by Pascal Couchepin
Preceded by Flavio Cotti	Vice President of Switzerland; 1998	Succeeded by Adolf Ogi
Preceded by Flavio Cotti	President of Switzerland; 1999	Succeeded by Adolf Ogi
