= 2004 in Switzerland =

- Decades: 1980s; 1990s; 2000s; 2010s; 2020s
- See also: History of Switzerland; Timeline of Swiss history; List of years in Switzerland

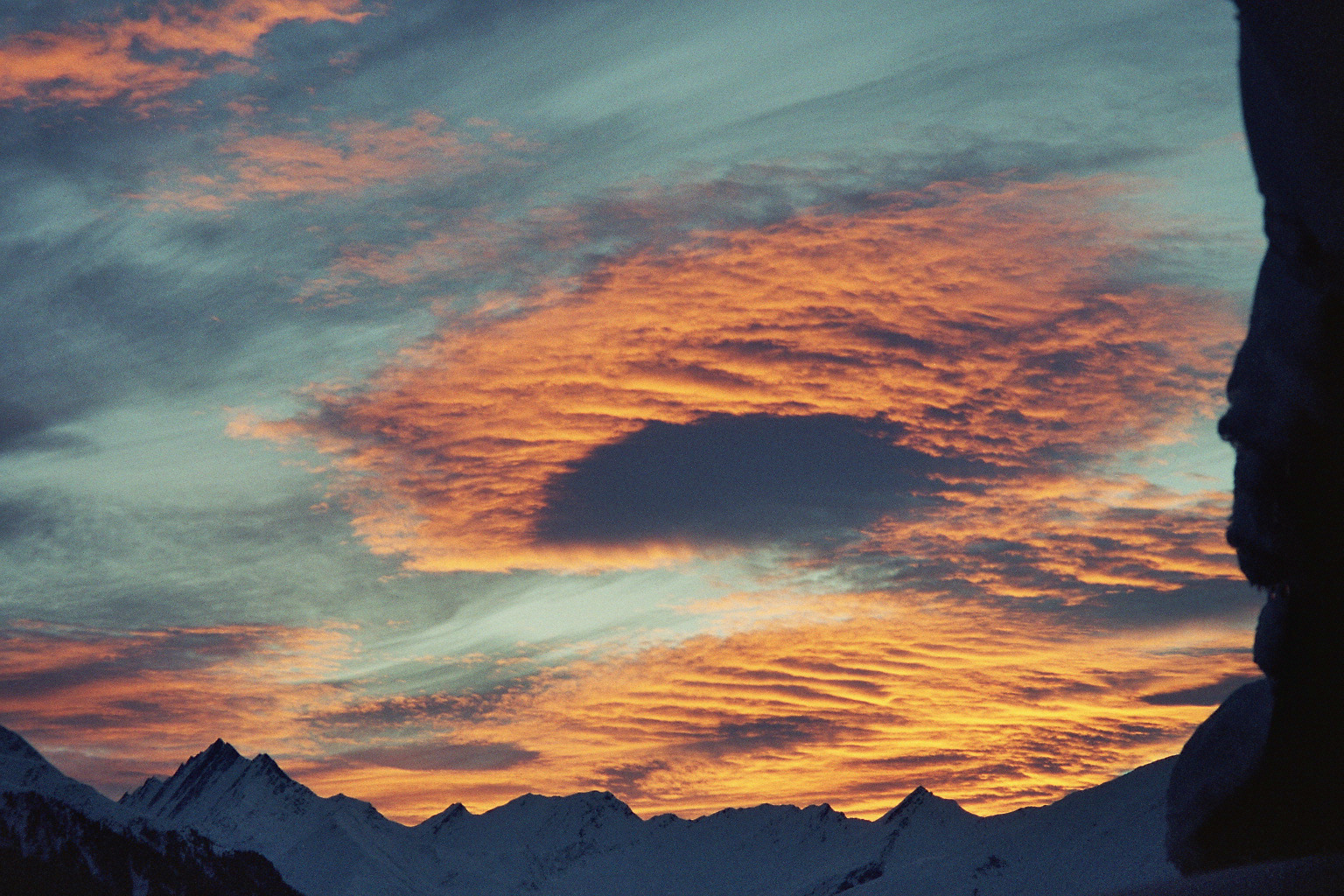
A view of Duvin towards Vrin at dusk.

Events from 2004 in Switzerland.

== Incumbents ==
- Joseph Deiss -- President of the Confederation 2004
- Samuel Schmid -- Vice-President of the Confederation 2004
- Max Binder -- President of the National Council 2004
- Fritz Schiesser -- President of the Council of States 2004
- Heinz Aemisegger - President of the Federal Supreme Court 2003-2004
- Giusep Nay - Vice-President of the Federal Supreme Court 2003-2004

== Awards ==
=== Literary awards ===
- Aargauer Literaturpreis 2004: Anna Felder
- Prix Dentan 2004: Jean-Michel Olivier for "L'enfant secret"
- Gottfried-Keller-Preis 2004: Klaus Merz
- Prix Littéraire Lipp Suisse 2004: Yvette Z'Graggen for "Un étang sous la glace"
- Prix Georges-Nicole 2004: Jean-Euphèle Milcé for "L'Alphabet des nuits"
- Prix Eugène Rambert 2004: Thomas Bouvier
- Prix Edouard Rod 2004: Georges Haldas
- Grosser Schillerpreis 2005: Erika Burkart
- ZKB Schillerpreis 2004: Christoph Keller for "Der beste Tänzer"
- Solothurner Literaturpreis 2004: Barbara Honigmann
- Spycher: Literaturpreis Leuk 2004: Felicitas Hoppe and Marcel Beyer

=== Film awards ===
- Swiss Film Prize 2004 (Schweizer Filmpreis/Prix du cinéma suisse)
  - Fiction: "Jagged Harmonies: Bach vs. Frederick II" by Dominique de Rivaz
  - Documentary: "Mais in Bundeshuss - Le génie helvétique" by Jean-Stéphane Bron
  - Short film: "L'escalier" by Frédéric Mermoud
  - Performance in a leading role: Bettina Stucky as "Meier Marilyn" in "Meier Marilyn" by Stina Werenfels
  - Performance in a supporting role: Gilles Tschudi as "Secretary Goltz" in "Jagged Harmonies: Bach vs. Frederick II" by Dominique de Rivaz
  - Special Jury Prize: Corinna Glaus for casting the film "Ready, Steady, Charlie!"
- Golden Leopard 2004: Private by Saverio Costanzo
- Berner Filmpreis: Dieter Fahrer for the documentary "Que sera?"
- Luzerner Filmpreis: "The Last Connection" by Marcel Baumann and "Wackelkontakt" by Ralph Etter
- Cinéma Tout Ecran 2004: Best Film "Avanim" by Raphaël Nadjari
- Zürcher Filmpreis:
  - "Im Nordwind" by Bettina Oberli, "Verflixt verliebt" by Peter Luisi, "Ma famille africaine" by Thomas Thümena, "Krokus – as long as we live" by Reto Caduff.
  - Fred van der Kooij, film director, and Matthias Brunner, movie theater director.
- See also: List of film awards

=== Other ===
- Swiss Award 2003:
  - Swiss of the Year: Roger Federer
  - Culture: Mario Botta, architect
  - Economy: Hansueli Loosli, member of management Coop.
  - Entertainment: DJ Bobo
  - Politics: Micheline Calmy-Rey
  - Society: Jacob Kellenberger, president ICRC.
  - Sports: Roger Federer
- Marcel Benoist Prize 2004: Adriano Aguzzi, neuropathologist at University of Zurich
- Swiss Big Brother Award 2004 (5th)
  - Government: Hansruedi Fehrlin, corps commander of the Swiss Air Force (use of surveillance drones)
  - Business: santésuisse (Tarmed system)
  - Workplace: Zurich Municipal Police (email surveillance)
  - Lifetime achievement: Josef Leu, National Councillor CVP/LU (parliamentary work)
  - Winkelried-Award: Daniele Jenni (attorney of WEF opponents)
- Prix Evenir 2004: Team Veloland Schweiz (Markus Capirone, Thomas Ledergerber, Martin Utiger and Peter Anrig)
- Prix Gaïa 2004: André Beyner
- Louis-Jeantet Prize for Medicine 2004: Hans Clevers and Alec J. Jeffreys
- Schweizer KleinKunstPreis 2004: Jean Claude Sassine and Andreas Thiel
- National Latsis-Prize 2004: Simon Gächter
- Miss Suisse 2004: Fiona Hefti
- Miss Suisse Romande 2004: Céline Nusbaumer
- Hans-Reinhart-Ring 2005: Dominique Catton
- Credit Suisse Sports Awards 2004:
  - Swiss Sportsperson of the Year
    - Female: Karin Thürig
    - Male: Roger Federer
  - Team: Patrick Heuscher and Stefan Kobel, beach volleyball players
  - Newcomer: Marcel Hug
  - Disabled: Urs Kolly
  - Coach: Rolf Kalich
- ThinkQuest Swiss Web Awards 2004: "Neeracherried ein Flachmoor"
- Grand Prix of the Fondation vaudoise pour la promotion et la création artistiques 2004: Thierry Lang
- Wakker Prize 2004: City of Biel/Bienne
- Prix Walo 2003
  - Public's favorite: Sven Epiney
  - Honorary: César Keiser and Margrit Läubli
  - Pop: Lunik
  - Rock: Patent Ochsner
  - Volksmusik: Original Streichmusik Alder
  - Comedy: Lorenz Keiser
  - Actor: Esther Gemsch
  - Film: Achtung, fertig, Charlie!
  - Newcomer: Mia Aegerter
  - TV: Lüthi & Blanc
- Kunstpreis der Stadt Zürich: Pierre Favre
  - Johann-Jakob-Bodmer-Medaille: Ilma Rakusa
- See also: Balzan Prize, Rose d'Or

== Deaths ==
- February 1: O. W. Fischer, 89, German actor, Ticino resident since the 1960s
- March 17: Monique Laederach, 65, French and German language author
- March 29: Peter Ustinov, 82, actor
- March 31: Hedi Lang, 72, politician, first woman to preside the National Council, member of the government the canton of Zurich
- April 15: Hans Gmür, 77, theatre author, director, composer, and producer
- April 17: Edmond Pidoux, 95, author
- April 24: José Giovanni, 80, French author, crime writer, film producer
- May 1: Felix Haug, 52, pop musician (Double)
- June 15: Ulrich Inderbinen, 103, mountain guide
- June: Rolf Wüthrich, 65, football player
- July 1: Ettore Cella, 90, actor, director, author, and translator
- July 4: Jean-Marie Auberson, 84, orchestra conductor
- July 14: Hans A. Pestalozzi, 75, author, manager, social critic
- August 22: Ota Šik, 84, Czech economist and politician, professor at St. Gallen
- August 24: Elisabeth Kübler-Ross, 78, Swiss-born American psychiatrist
- August 28: Sigi Feigel, 83, attorney
- September 29: Alberto Camenzind, 90, architect (Professor emeritus at the ETH Zurich)
- October 22: Jean-François Leuba, 70, politician
- October 30: Ernst Cincera, 77, National Councillor
- November 21: Uwe Scholz, 45, German dance choreographer, director Zurich Opera ballet (1985–1991)
- November 26: Hans Schaffner, 96, member of the Federal Council in the 1960s
- November 27: 7 fire fighters in Gretzenbach
- December 16: Dietrich Schwanitz, 64, German professor and author, grew up in Switzerland.
- December 17: Gyula Marsovsky, 68, Grand Prix motorcycle rider
- December 22: Peter Schärer, 71, dean of Dental School, Zurich
