= 2005 in Switzerland =

- Decades: 1980s; 1990s; 2000s; 2010s; 2020s
- See also: History of Switzerland; Timeline of Swiss history; List of years in Switzerland

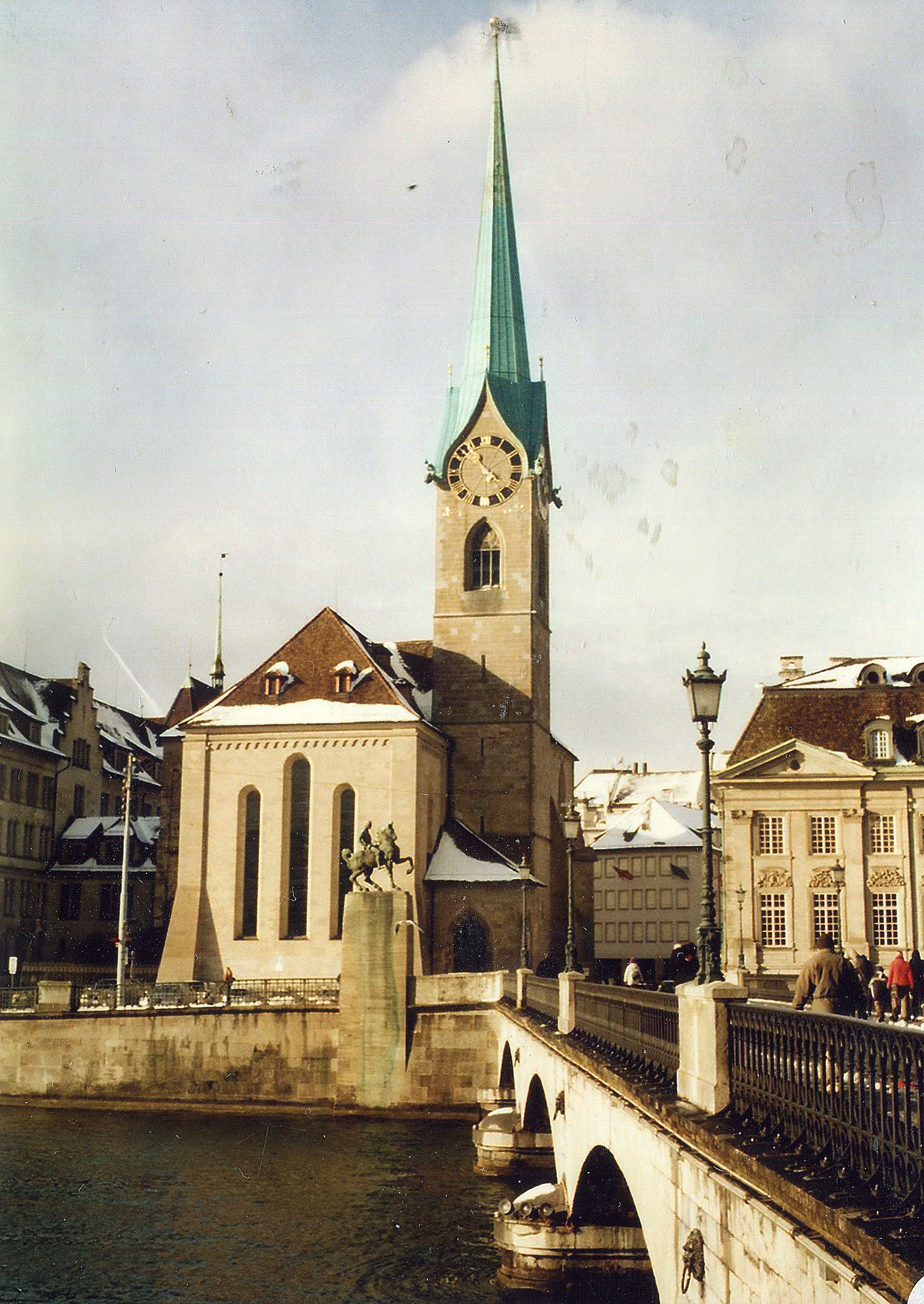

Events from 2005 in Switzerland.

== Incumbents ==
See: List of 2005 office-holders in Switzerland

== Events ==
Public holidays in one or several cantons of Switzerland are marked (¹).

=== January ===
- January 1: New Year's Day¹
- January 2: Berchtoldstag¹
- January 6: Epiphany¹
- January 13: Silvesterkläuse in Urnäsch, custom on New Year's Eve according to the Julian calendar.
- January 14–16: Lauberhorn Alpine Skiing World Cup race in Wengen: Michael Walchhofer finished first.
- January 24–30: 40th Solothurn Film Festival
- January 26–30: World Economic Forum in Davos

=== February ===
- February 3–8: Fasnacht in Lucerne, carnival
- February 5: L'Hom Strom custom in Scuol
- February 14–16: Fasnacht in Basel, carnival
- February 18–27: Muba in Basel
- February 27: Sunday for Votes and elections (at least quarterly ): Federal votes and cantonal elections for parliaments of AG and SO, executive of AR, NW, LU, SO, ZH.
- February 28-March 18: Federal Parliament spring session

=== March ===
- March 1: Chalandamarz custom in Engadin and other parts of the Grisons
- March 1: Proclamation of the Republic¹ in Neuchâtel
- March 3–13: International Motor Show in Geneva
- March 9–13: Alpine Skiing World Cup races in Lenzerheide
- March 13: 37th Engadin Skimarathon
- March 19: Saint Joseph's Day¹
- March 25: Good Friday¹
- March 27: Easter Sunday¹
- March 28: Easter Monday¹

=== April ===
- April 7: Näfelser Fahrt¹ in the Canton of Glarus, commemoration of the Battle of Näfels (1388)
- April 10: Election for cantonal parliament and executive in Neuchâtel
- April 18: Sechseläuten¹ in Zürich
- April 18–22: Federal Parliament special session
- April 24: cantonal Landsgemeinde in Appenzell

=== May ===
- May 1: May Day¹
- May 1: cantonal Landsgemeinde in Glarus
- May 5: Ascension Day¹
- May 5: Banntag custom in the canton of Basel-Country
- May 15: Pentecost¹
- May 16: Whit Monday¹
- May 16: Football Cup final in Basel
- May 24–27: Orbit and Internet Expo in Basel
- May 26: Corpus Christi¹
- May 30-June 17: Federal Parliament summer session

=== June ===
- June 5: Sunday for votes and elections
- June 11–19: Tour de Suisse road cycling competition
- June 15–20: Art Basel, art fair in Basel
- June 17–19: 26th Eidgenössisches Jodlerfest in Aarau
- June 20-July 17: Eidgenössisches Schützenfest in Frauenfeld
- June 23: Jura Independence Day¹
- June 29: St. Peter and Paul¹ in Ticino

=== July ===
- July 1–16: 39th Montreux Jazz Festival in Montreux
- July 9: Commemoration of the Battle of Sempach (1386) in Lucerne

=== August ===
- New year for schools/universities 2005/2006
- August 1: Swiss National Day¹
- August 3–13: 58th Locarno International Film Festival in Locarno
- August 15: Assumption of Mary¹
- August 19–20: St.Galler Fäscht

=== September ===
- September 8: Jeûne genevois¹ in Geneva
- September 10–11: European Heritage Days (Journées du patrimoine)
- September 10–12: Knabenschiessen¹ in Zürich
- September 18: Jeûne fédéral (federal day of fasting)¹
- September 19: Monday afterwards (Lundi du Jeûne)¹ in Neuchâtel and Vaud
- September 19-October 7: Federal Parliament autumn session
- September 21–23: 4th Standardization and Innovation in Information Technology conference in Geneva
- September 23–25: 80th Fête des Vendanges in Neuchâtel, vintage festival
- September 25: Sunday for votes and elections
- September 25: St. Nikolaus of Flüe¹ in Obwalden

=== October ===
- October 13–23: Olma in St. Gallen

=== November ===
- November 1: All Saints¹
- November 11: Gansabhauet in Sursee, local Saint Martin's Day custom
- November 15: Commemoration of the Battle of Morgarten (1315) in Zug and Schwyz
- November 27: Sunday for votes and elections
- November 28-December 16: Federal Parliament winter session
- November 28: Zibelemärit in Bern

=== December ===
- December 5: Klausjagen in Küssnacht
- December 7: Election of the President of the Confederation for 2006 by the Federal Parliament
- December 8: Immaculate Conception¹
- December 10–11: Escalade (1602) commemoration in Geneva
- December 25: Christmas¹
- December 26: Saint Stephen's Day¹
- December: Spengler Cup in Davos, ice hockey tournament
- December 31: Restoration of the Republic¹ in Geneva

== Awards ==
- Swiss Award 2004:
  - Swiss of the Year: Lotti Latrous
  - Culture: Bruno Ganz
  - Economy: Beatrice Weder di Mauro
  - Entertainment: Mia Aegerter
  - Politics: Jean Ziegler
  - Society: Ruedi Lüthy
  - Sports: Marcel Fischer
- Swiss Film Prize 2005 (Schweizer Filmpreis/Prix du cinéma suisse)
  - Fiction: "Tout un hiver sans feu" by Greg Zglinski
  - Documentary: "Accordion Tribe" by Stefan Schwietert
  - Short film: "Cheyenne" by Alexander Meier
  - Animation film: "Un'altra città" by Carlo Ippolito
  - Performance in a leading role: Roeland Wiesnekker in "Strähl" by Manuel Flurin Hendry
  - Performance in a supporting role: Johanna Bantzer in "Strähl"
  - Special Jury Prize: Filip Zumbrunn for camera and light in "Strähl"
- Innerschweizer Kulturpreis 2005: Martin Stadler
- Schweizer KleinKunstPreis 2005: Gardi Hutter
- Wakker Prize 2005: SBB-CFF-FFS

== Deaths ==
- January 14: Georges Piroué, 85, writer
- January 29: Ephraim Kishon, 80, satirist, writer, film director
- February 1: Werner Arnold, 74, cyclist
- February 3: David Hönigsberg, 45, composer, music teacher and conductor
- February 16: Marcello Viotti, 50, conductor
- February 18: Harald Szeemann, 71, curator and art historian

== See also ==
- 2005 in Swiss music
