= Schwarzsee (Zermatt) =

Lake near Zermatt in the canton of Valais, Switzerland

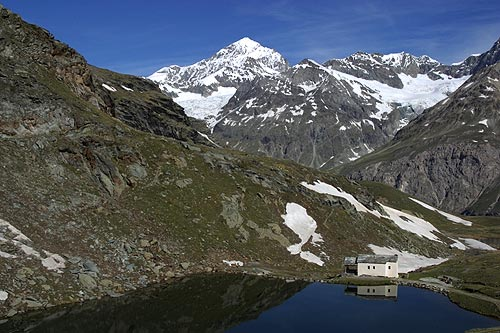
- Schwarzsee with chapel Maria zum Schnee, in the background from left Dent Blanche, Äbihorn and Arbenhorn

- Location within Canton of Valais Location within Aosta Valley Location within Switzerland Location within Italy Location within Alps
- Interactive map of Schwarzsee
- Location: Above Zermatt, Valais
- Coordinates: 45°59′27″N 7°42′25″E
- Primary outflows: Teifbach
- Basin countries: Switzerland
- Surface area: 0.5 ha (1.2 acres)
- Surface elevation: 2,583 m (8,474 ft)

The Schwarzsee (German for "Black Lake") is a small lake near Zermatt in the canton of Valais, Switzerland. It is located below the Matterhorn next to the mountain ridge (2,583 m (8,474 ft)) and to the cable car station of the same name at an elevation of 2,552 m (8,373 ft).

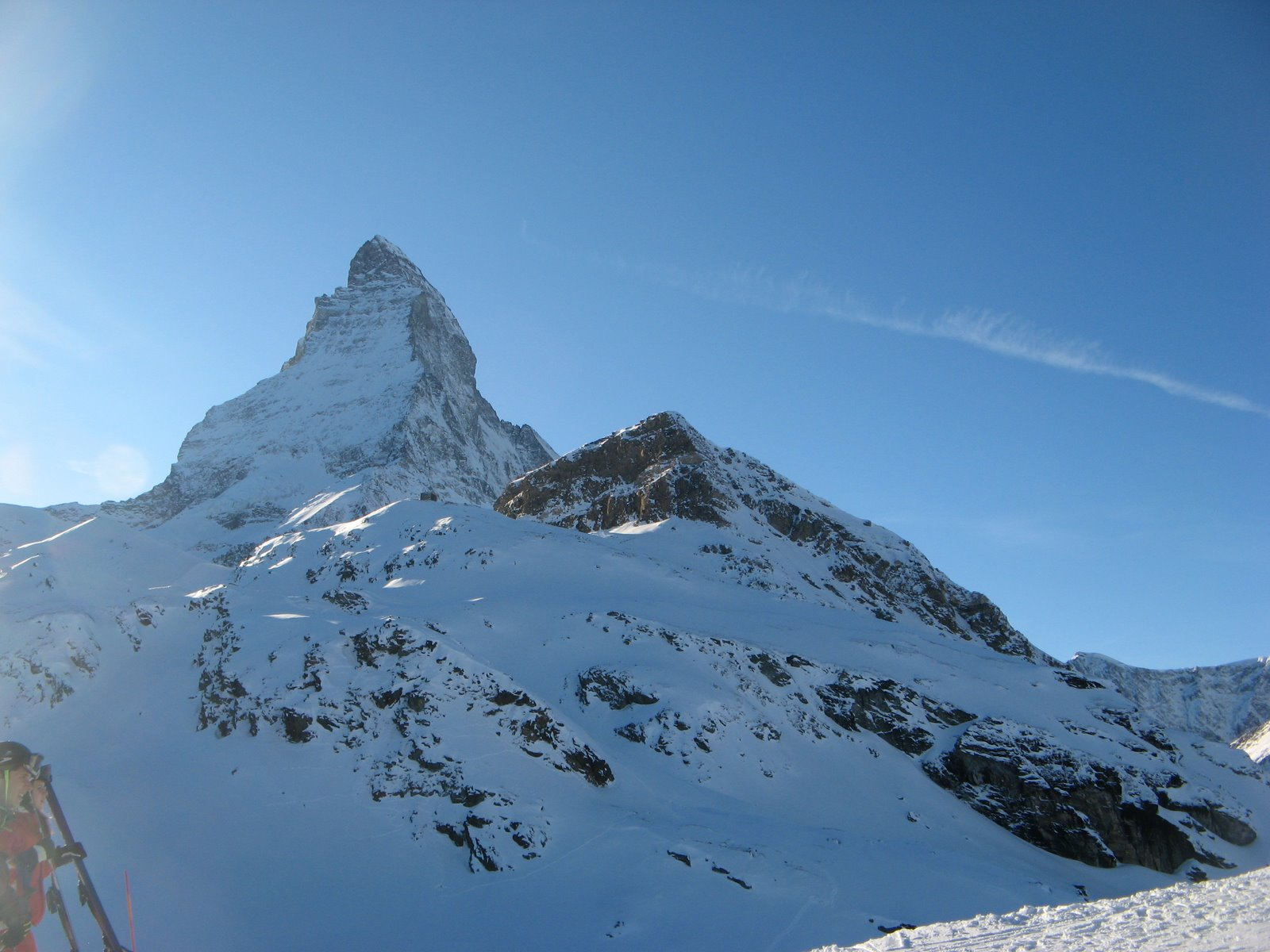
The Matterhorn from Schwarzsee

Its surface area is 0.5 ha. A chapel dedicated to Mary of the Snows – the chapel Maria zum Schnee – lies on the edge of the lake.

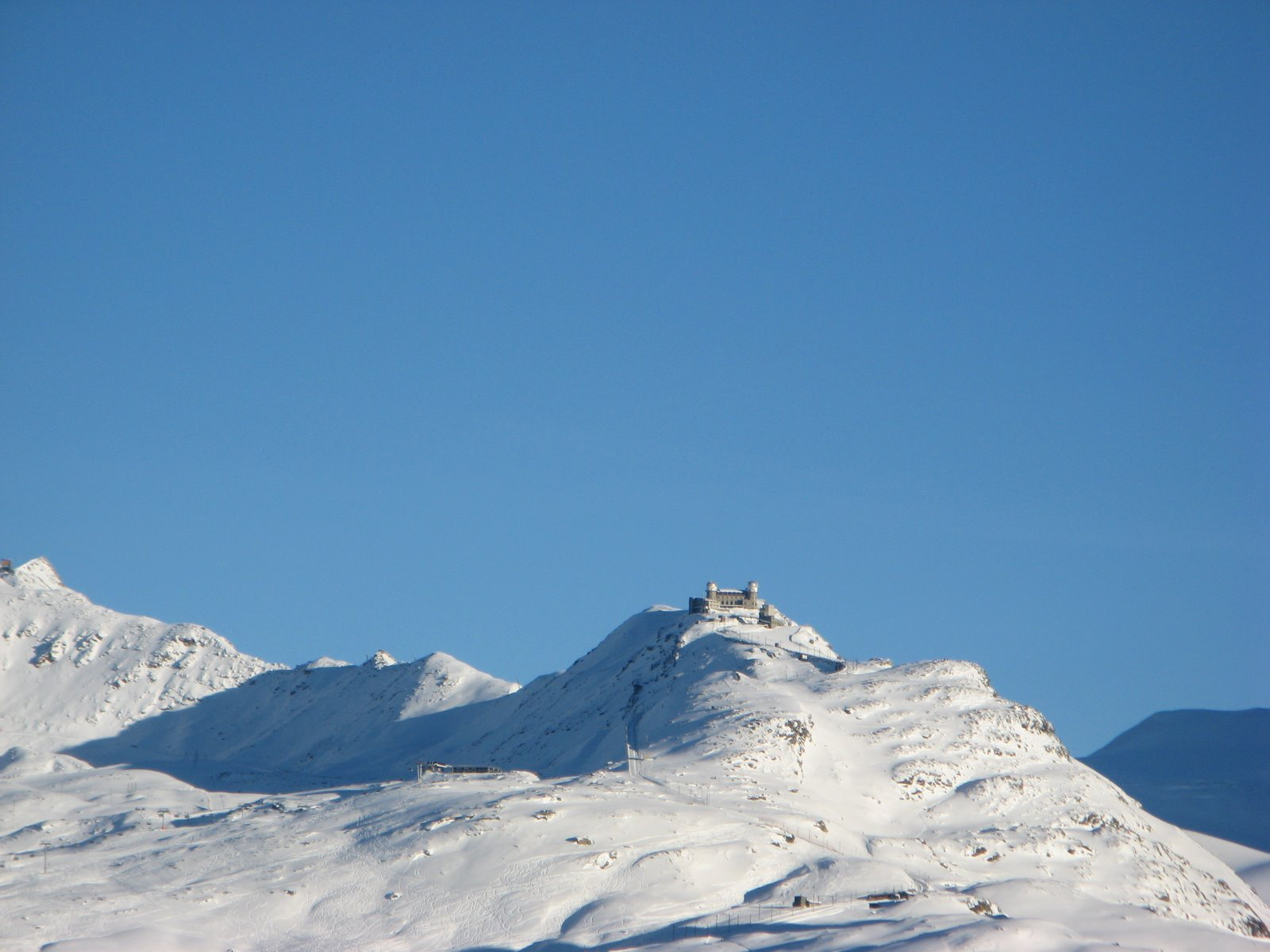
Gornergrat from Schwarzsee

It can be reached by cable car from Zermatt.
