= Zum See =

Hamlet in the canton of Valais, Switzerland

Coordinates: 46°00′23″N 7°43′55″E

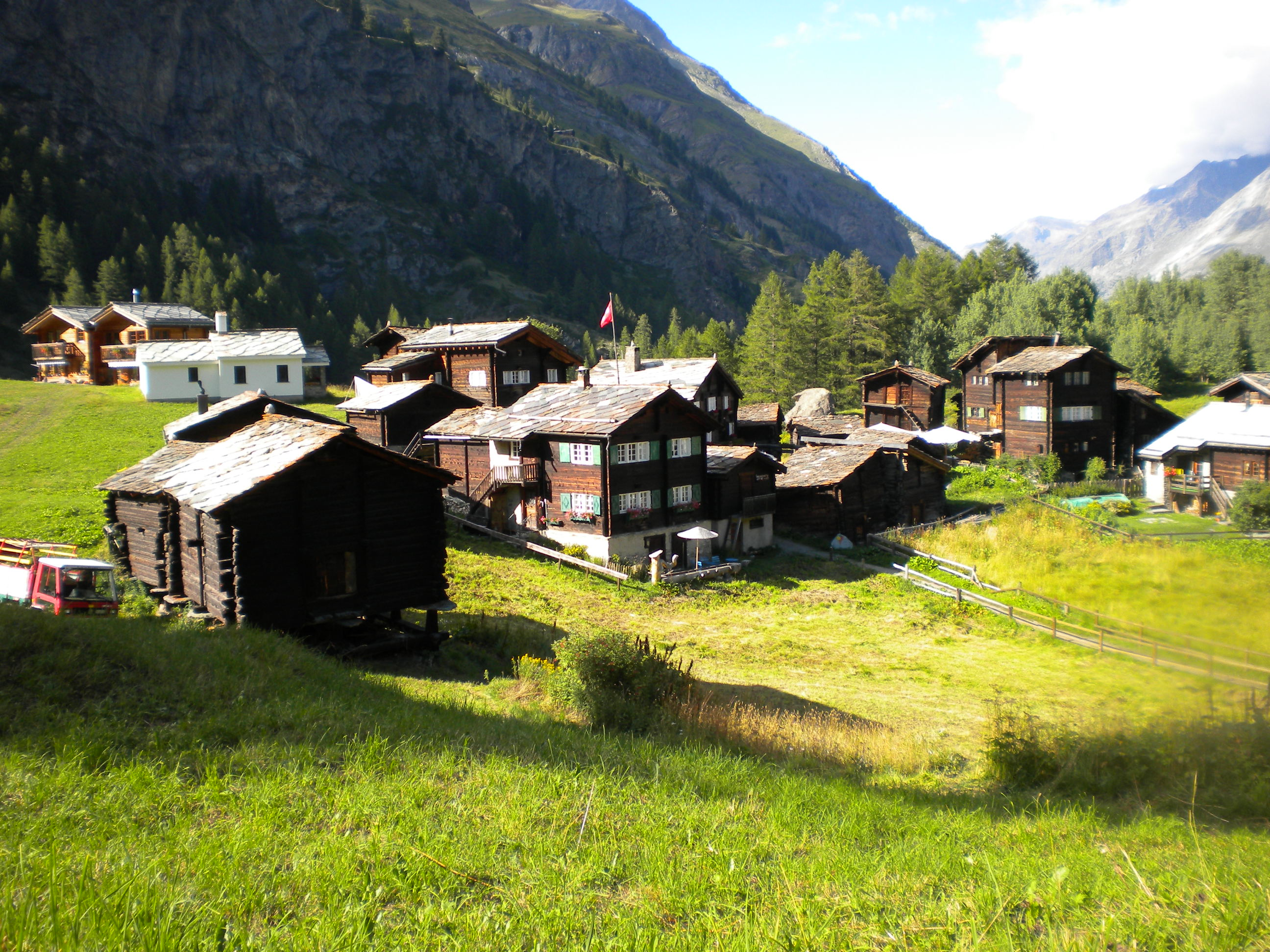
Looking north

Zum See is a hamlet in the canton of Valais. It is located above Zermatt at a height of 1,766 metres (5,794 ft), between the rivers Zmuttbach and Gornera, at the foot the Matterhorn. The hamlet includes a chapel and a gastronomic restaurant.

Zum See can be reached by foot only, from Zermatt or from the Furi cable car station, located just above the hamlet.
