= Zermatt =

Place in Valais, Switzerland

- Municipality
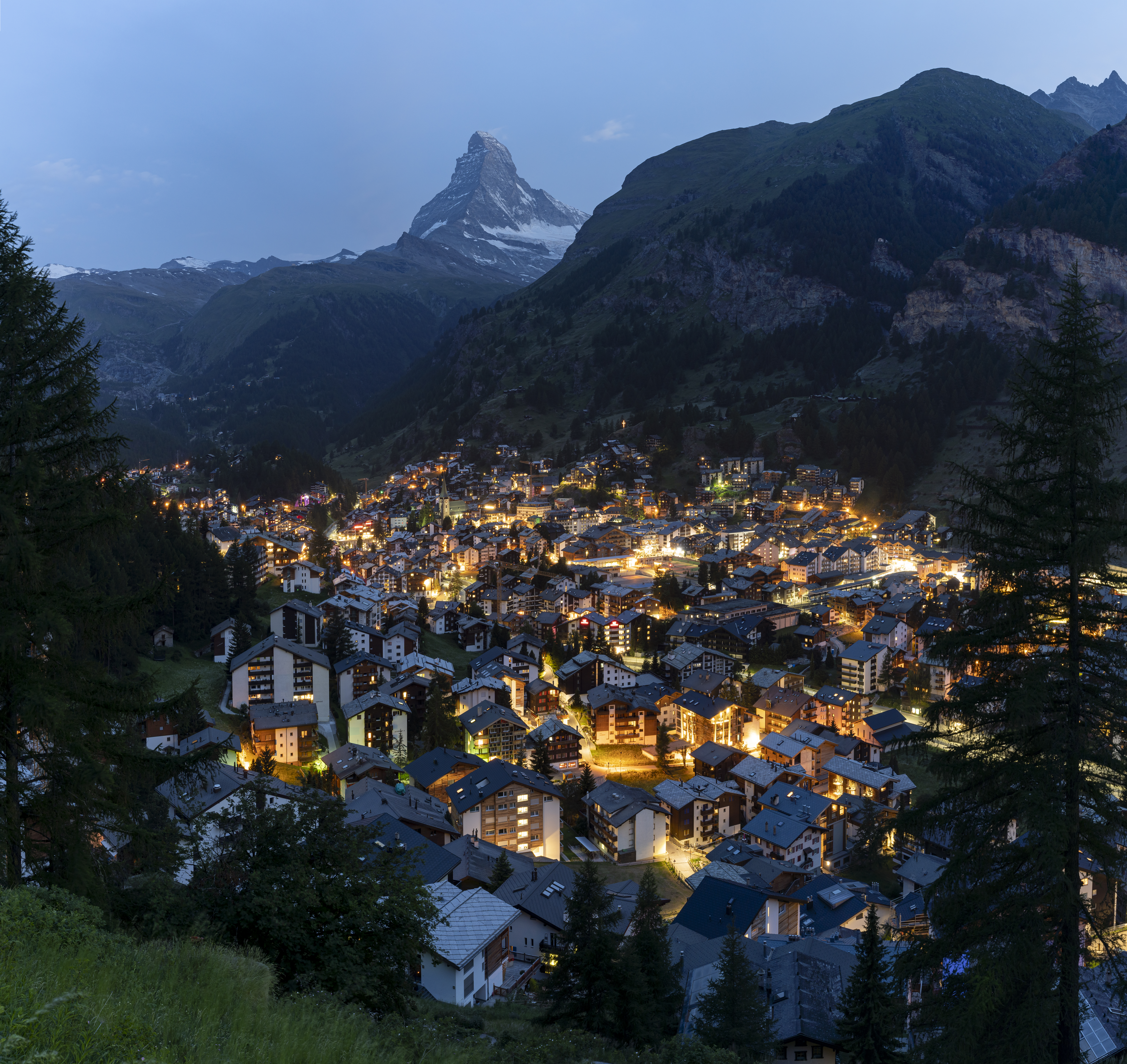
- June 2022 view from Moosstrasse

- Flag Coat of arms
- Location of Zermatt
- Location within Switzerland Location within Canton of Valais
- Coordinates: 46°01′N 7°45′E
- Country: Switzerland
- Canton: Valais
- District: Visp

Government
  - Mayor: Romy Biner-Hauser

Area
  - Total: 242.67 km^{2} (93.70 sq mi)
- Elevation: 1,608 m (5,276 ft)

Population (December 2007)
  - Total: 5,786
  - Density: 23.84/km^{2} (61.75/sq mi)
- Time zone: UTC+01:00 (CET)
  - Summer (DST): UTC+02:00 (CEST)
- Postal code: 3920
- SFOS number: 6300
- ISO 3166 code: CH-VS
- Localities: Blatten, Findeln, Gornergrat, Ried, Schwarzsee, Z'mutt
- Surrounded by: Alagna Valsesia (IT-VC), Ayas (IT-AO), Ayer, Bionaz (IT-AO), Evolène, Gressoney-La-Trinité (IT-AO), Macugnaga (IT-VB), Randa, Saas-Almagell, Täsch, Valtournenche (IT-AO)
- Twin towns: Alfano (Italy)
- Website: gemeinde.zermatt.ch

Zermatt (German: [tsɛʁˈmat], Swiss Standard German: [tsɛrˈmat]; Highest Alemannic: Zärmatt) is a municipality in the district of Visp in the German-speaking section of the canton of Valais in Switzerland. It has a year-round population of about 5,800 and is classified as a town by the Swiss Federal Statistical Office (FSO).

It lies at the upper end of Mattertal at an elevation of 1,620 m (5,310 ft), at the foot of Switzerland's highest peaks. It lies about 10 km (6.2 mi) from the over 3,292 m (10,801 ft) high Theodul Pass bordering Italy. Zermatt is the southernmost commune of the German Sprachraum.

Zermatt is famed as a mountaineering and ski resort of the Swiss Alps. Until the mid-19th century, it was predominantly an agricultural community; the first and tragic ascent of the Matterhorn in 1865 was followed by a rush on the mountains surrounding the village, leading to the construction of many tourist facilities. The year-round population (as of December 2020) is 5,820, though there may be several times as many tourists in Zermatt at any one time. Much of the local economy is based on tourism, with about half of the jobs in town in hotels or restaurants and just under half of all apartments are vacation apartments. Just over one-third of the permanent population was born in the town, while another third moved to Zermatt from outside Switzerland.

== Etymology ==
The name of Zermatt, as well as that of the Matterhorn itself, derives from the alpine meadows, or matten (in German), in the valley. The name appeared first as Zur Matte ("at the meadow") and became later Zermatt. It does not appear until 1495 on a map or 1546 in a text, but may have been employed long before.

Praborno or Prato Borno (Prato also means meadow) are the older names of Zermatt; they appear in the ancient maps as early as the thirteenth century. The Romand-speaking people from the Aosta Valley and from the Romand-speaking part of canton Wallis (Valais) used this name until about 1860 in the form of Praborne, or Praborgne. The reason of this change from Praborno to Zermatt is attributed to the gradual replacement of the Romance-speaking people by German-speaking colony.

== Geography ==
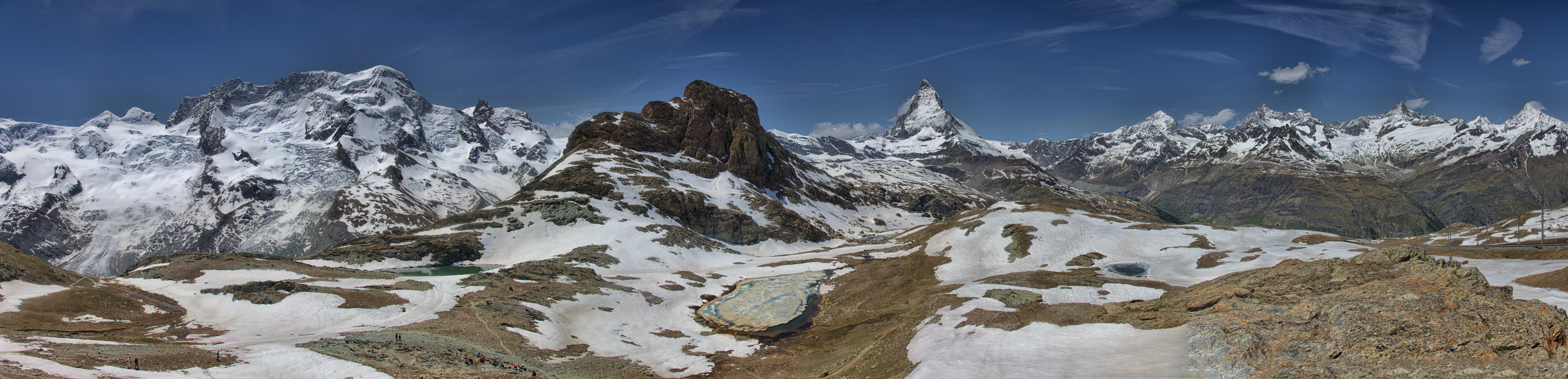
Panorama View of Summits

The town of Zermatt lies at the southern end of the Matter Valley (German: Mattertal), which is one of the lateral branches of the grand Valley of the Rhône. Zermatt is almost completely surrounded by the high mountains of the Pennine Alps including Monte Rosa (specifically its tallest peak, named Dufourspitze), Switzerland's highest peak at 4,634 metres (15,203 ft) above sea level. It is followed by the Dom (4,545 m [14,911 ft]), Liskamm (4,527 m [14,852 ft]), Weisshorn (4,505 m [14,780 ft]) and the Matterhorn (4,478 m [14,692 ft]). Most of the Alpine four-thousanders are located around Zermatt or in the neighbouring valleys.

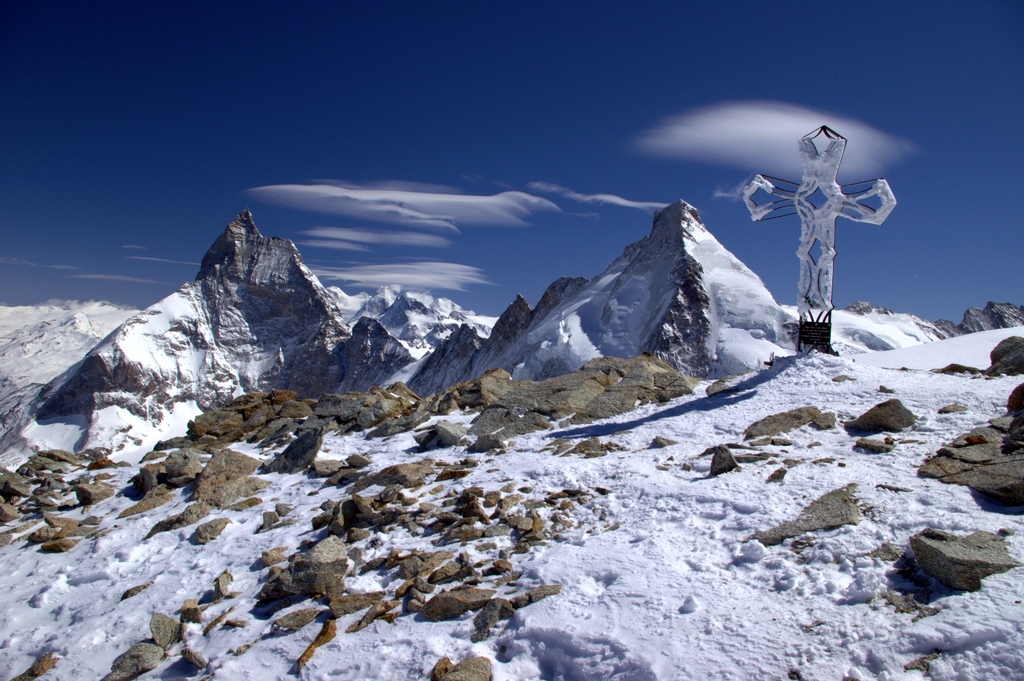
The high summits around Zermatt

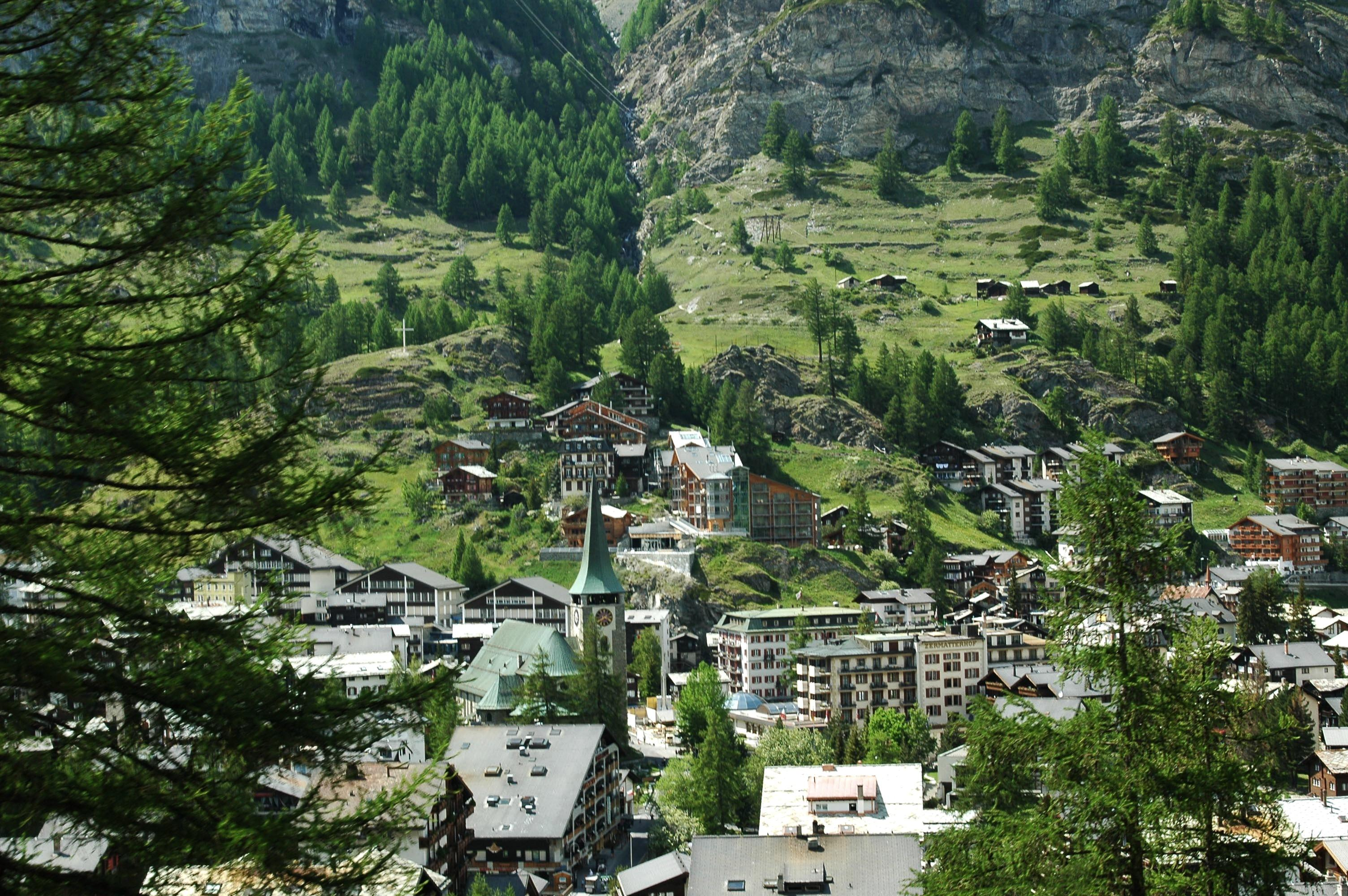
View of Zermatt with the main church (from the east side)

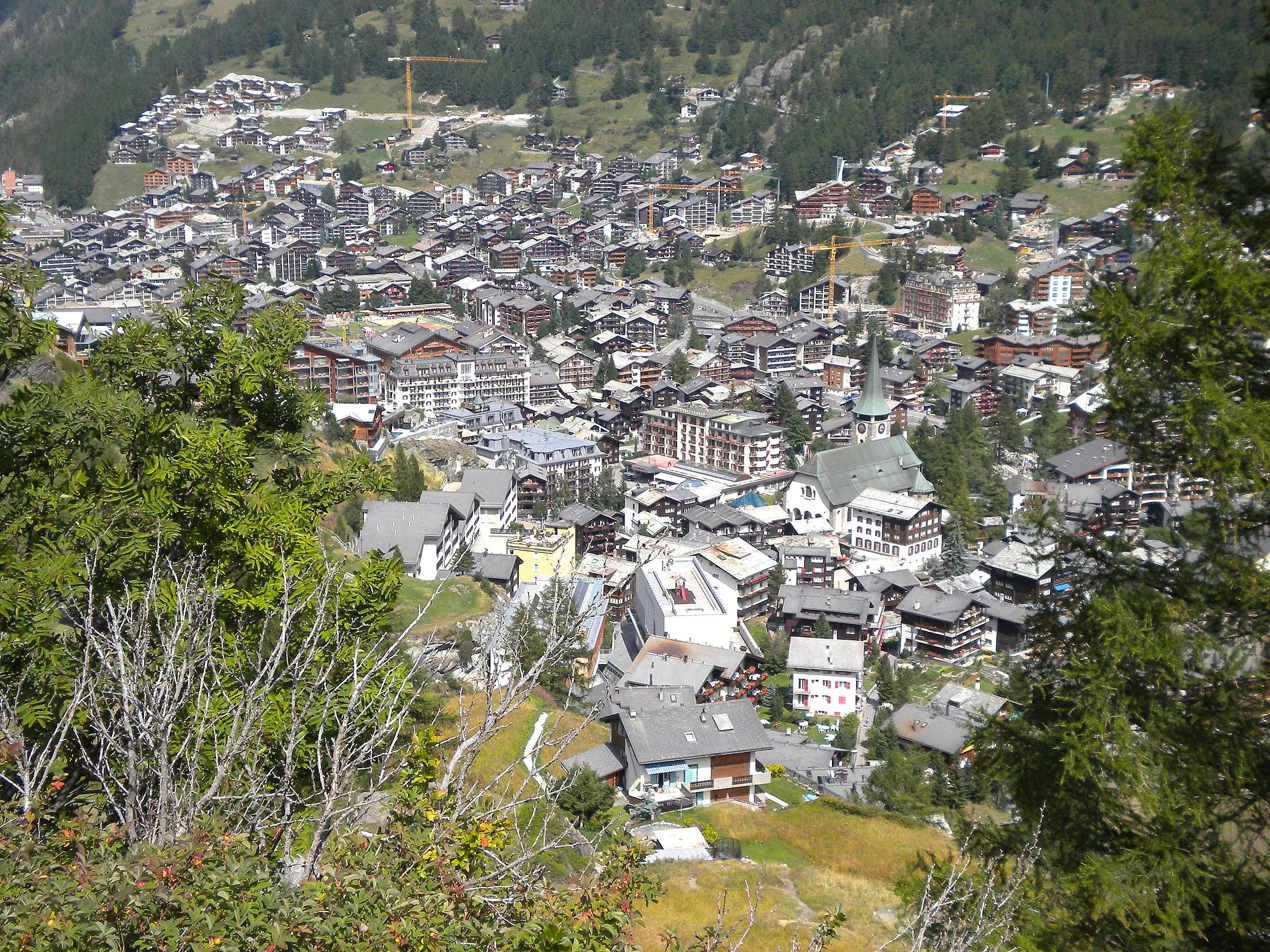
View of the centre of Zermatt (from the west side)

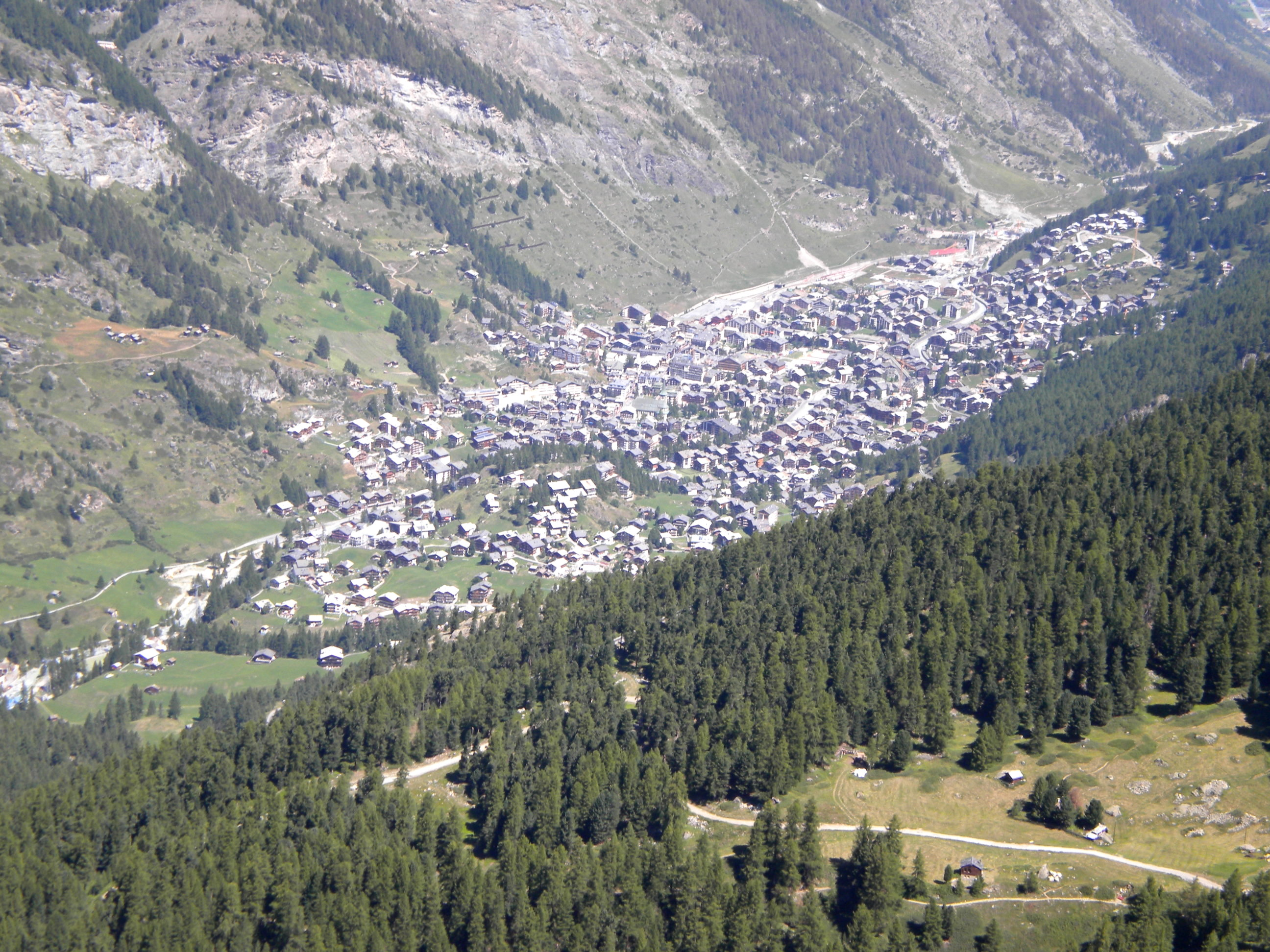
View from Riffelalp towards Zermatt

Zermatt is traversed by the main river of the valley: the Matter Vispa, which rises at the glaciers at the feet of the highest peaks: the Gorner Glacier on the east side near Monte Rosa and the Zmutt Glacier on the west side between Dent d'Hérens and Dent Blanche.

The town of Zermatt, while dense, is geographically small. There are three main streets which run along the banks of the Matter Vispa, and numerous cross-streets, especially around the station and the church which forms the centre of Zermatt. In general anything is at most a thirty-minute walk away. There are several "suburbs" within Zermatt. Winkelmatten/Moos, which was once a separate hamlet, lies on a hill (1,670 m [5,480 ft]) on the southern side. Steinmatten is located on the eastern bank of the main river.

Many hamlets are located in the valleys above Zermatt, however they are not usually inhabited all year round. Zum See (1,766 m [5,794 ft]) lies south of Zermatt on the west bank of the Gorner gorge, near Furi where a cable car station is located (1,867 m [6,125 ft]). On the side of Zmutt valley (west of Zermatt) lies the hamlet of Zmutt (1,936 m [6,352 ft]), north of the creek Zmuttbach. Findeln (2,051 m [6,729 ft]) is located in the eastern valley above the creek Findelbach. It lies below the Sunnegga station (2,278 m [7,474 ft]). Located near a train station of the Gornergratbahn, Riffelalp (2,222 m [7,290 ft]) is one of the highest hamlets with a chapel.

Zermatt had an area, (as of the 2004/09 survey) of 242.91 km^{2} (93.79 sq mi). Of this area, about 9.4% is used for agricultural purposes, while 4.6% is forested. Of the rest of the land, 0.8% is settled (buildings or roads) and 85.2% is unproductive land. Over the past two decades (1979/85-2004/09) the amount of land that is settled has increased by 54 ha (130 acres) and the agricultural land has decreased by 160 ha (400 acres).

== Climate ==
Zermatt has a subarctic climate (Köppen climate classification: Dfc). Summertime is cool in Zermatt, with mild days and cool nights, while winter is cold and snowy, with highs around freezing and annual snowfall averaging 128 inches (325 cm).

Climate data for Zermatt, elevation 1,638 m (5,374 ft), (1991–2020 normals, extremes 1991–present)
Month	Jan	Feb	Mar	Apr	May	Jun	Jul	Aug	Sep	Oct	Nov	Dec	Year
Record high °C (°F)	13.4 (56.1)	14.8 (58.6)	18.1 (64.6)	22.3 (72.1)	25.1 (77.2)	30.2 (86.4)	30.5 (86.9)	31.2 (88.2)	26.1 (79.0)	22.4 (72.3)	18.0 (64.4)	11.7 (53.1)	31.2 (88.2)
Mean daily maximum °C (°F)	0.8 (33.4)	1.7 (35.1)	5.7 (42.3)	9.8 (49.6)	13.9 (57.0)	17.8 (64.0)	20.0 (68.0)	19.6 (67.3)	15.4 (59.7)	11.2 (52.2)	5.1 (41.2)	1.5 (34.7)	10.2 (50.4)
Daily mean °C (°F)	−3.9 (25.0)	−3.4 (25.9)	0.2 (32.4)	4.0 (39.2)	8.1 (46.6)	11.8 (53.2)	13.7 (56.7)	13.3 (55.9)	9.4 (48.9)	5.4 (41.7)	0.3 (32.5)	−3.0 (26.6)	4.7 (40.5)
Mean daily minimum °C (°F)	−7.4 (18.7)	−7.3 (18.9)	−4.0 (24.8)	−0.7 (30.7)	3.2 (37.8)	6.6 (43.9)	8.3 (46.9)	8.3 (46.9)	5.0 (41.0)	1.4 (34.5)	−3.1 (26.4)	−6.3 (20.7)	0.3 (32.5)
Record low °C (°F)	−19.2 (−2.6)	−22.2 (−8.0)	−18.2 (−0.8)	−9.3 (15.3)	−7.1 (19.2)	−3.8 (25.2)	1.1 (34.0)	−0.3 (31.5)	−3.0 (26.6)	−9.6 (14.7)	−14.8 (5.4)	−18.2 (−0.8)	−22.2 (−8.0)
Average precipitation mm (inches)	42.2 (1.66)	29.7 (1.17)	33.3 (1.31)	39.9 (1.57)	77.4 (3.05)	69.9 (2.75)	58.9 (2.32)	68.4 (2.69)	51.2 (2.02)	57.0 (2.24)	65.2 (2.57)	47.3 (1.86)	640.4 (25.21)
Average snowfall cm (inches)	53.4 (21.0)	43.8 (17.2)	31.8 (12.5)	21.3 (8.4)	6.5 (2.6)	0.0 (0.0)	0.0 (0.0)	0.0 (0.0)	0.0 (0.0)	8.9 (3.5)	42.1 (16.6)	56.9 (22.4)	264.7 (104.2)
Average precipitation days (≥ 1.0 mm)	6.3	5.5	5.3	6.3	9.5	9.7	9.0	9.8	7.3	7.0	7.1	6.9	89.7
Average snowy days (≥ 1.0 cm)	6.5	6.8	4.9	3.3	0.7	0.0	0.0	0.0	0.0	1.6	4.9	7.8	36.5
Average relative humidity (%)	63	61	60	59	64	66	65	67	70	69	68	66	65
Mean monthly sunshine hours	83.8	109.0	150.7	146.8	155.2	171.2	185.3	176.1	155.8	132.9	89.1	82.6	1,648.5
Percentage possible sunshine	59	61	63	58	54	59	63	65	65	63	55	56	60
Source 1: NOAA
Source 2: MeteoSwiss Infoclimat (extremes)

== Tourism ==
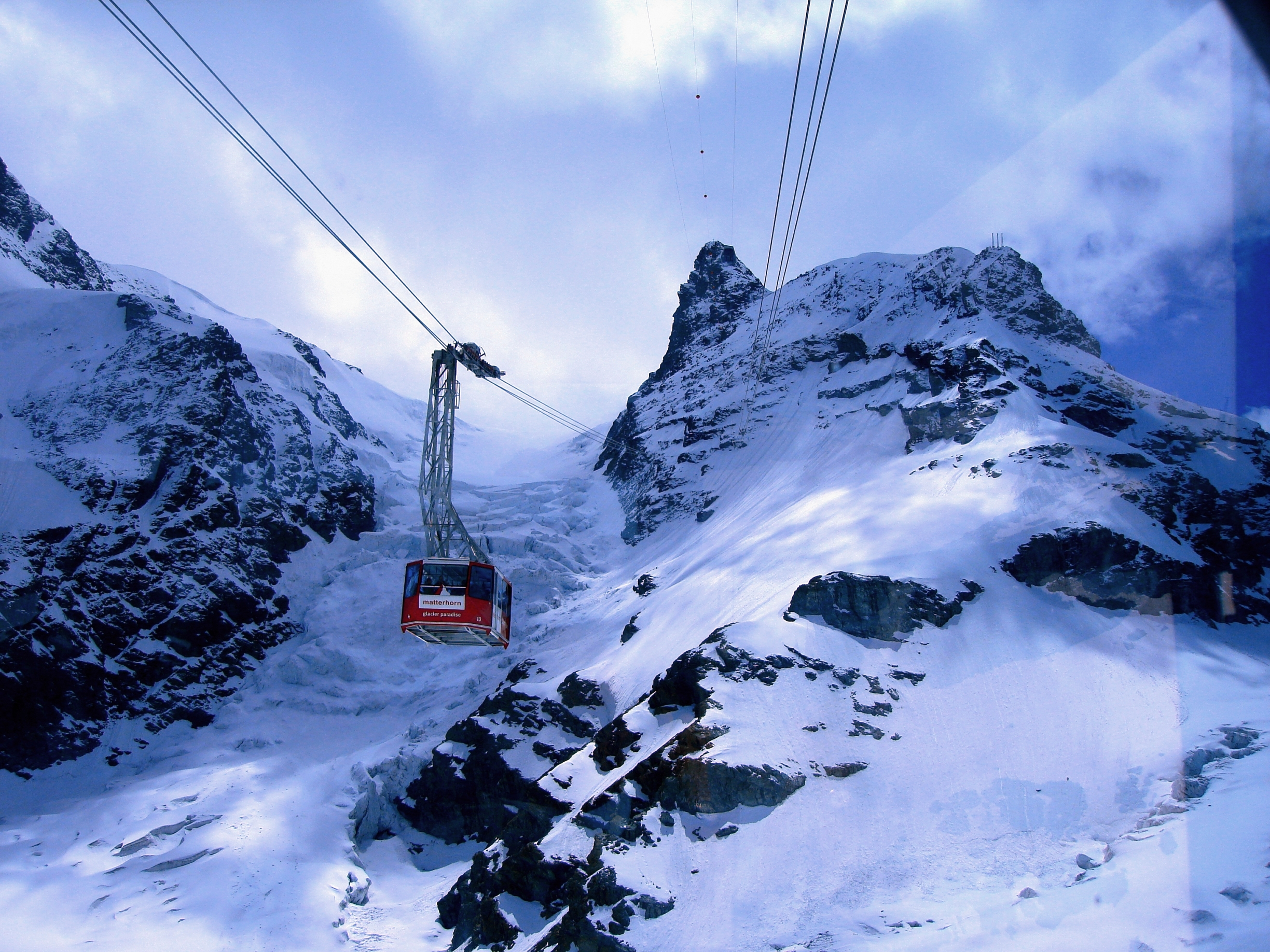
Cable car heading towards Klein Matterhorn

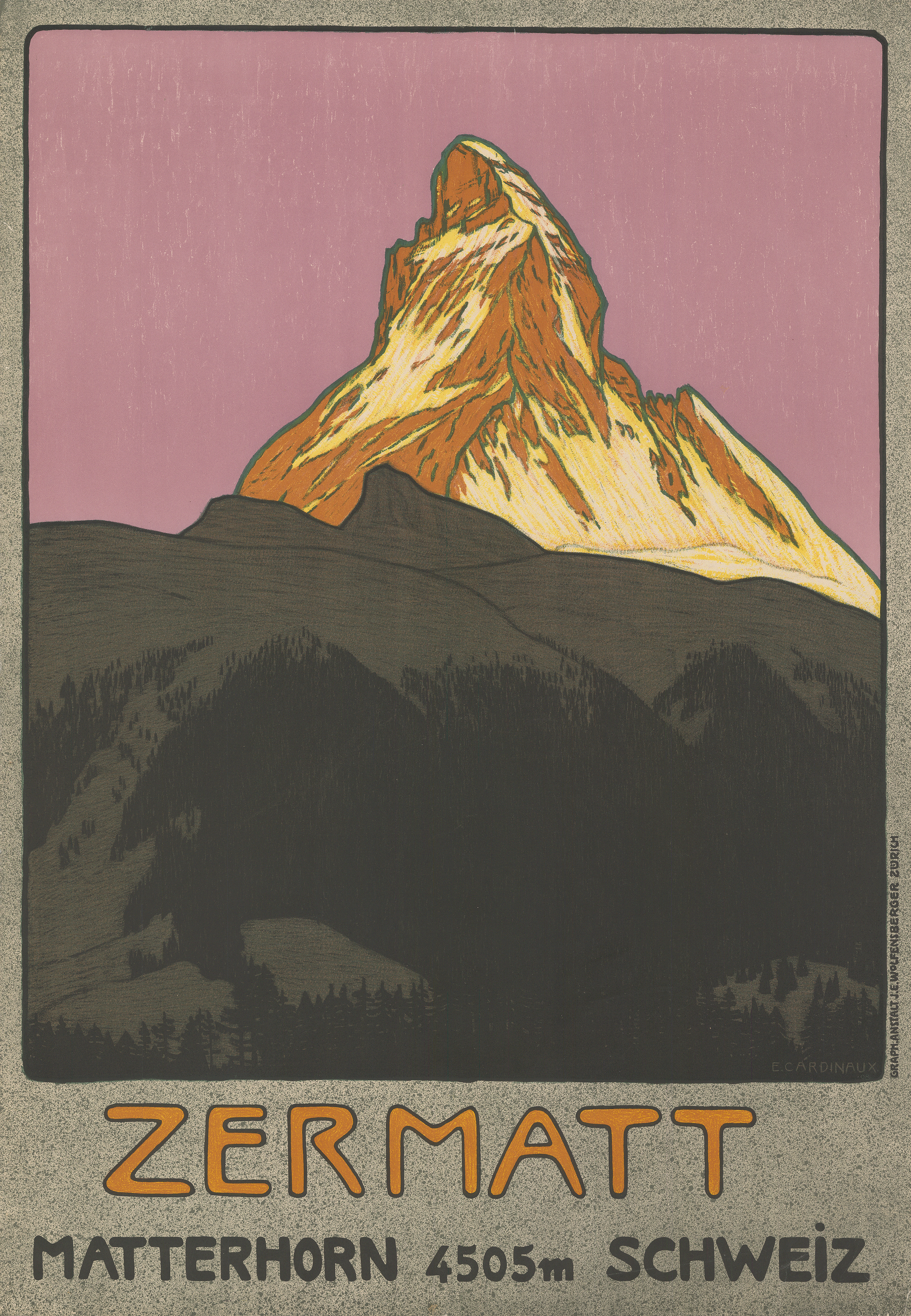
Poster by Emil Cardinaux advertising Zermatt (1908)

The village was "discovered" by mid-nineteenth-century British mountaineers, most notably Edward Whymper, whose summit of the Matterhorn made the village famous. The Matterhorn was one of the last alpine mountains to be summited (in 1865), and the first expedition that reached the top ended dramatically with only three of the seven climbers surviving the descent. The story is related in the Matterhorn Museum.

Zermatt is a starting point for hikes into the mountains, including the Haute Route that leads to Chamonix in France and the Patrouille des Glaciers. Cable cars and chair lifts carry skiers in the winter and hikers in the summer; the highest of them leads to the Klein Matterhorn at 3,883 m (12,740 ft), a peak on the ridge between Breithorn and Matterhorn that offers extensive views in all directions. It is possible to cross into Italy via the Cervinia cable car station. A rack railway line (the Gornergratbahn, the highest open-air railway in Europe) runs up to the summit of the Gornergrat at 3,089 m (10,135 ft). Zermatt is also the western terminus for the Glacier Express rail service connecting to St. Moritz and the MGB (Matterhorn Gotthard Bahn). Together with eleven other towns Zermatt is a member of the community Best of the Alps.

== Transport ==
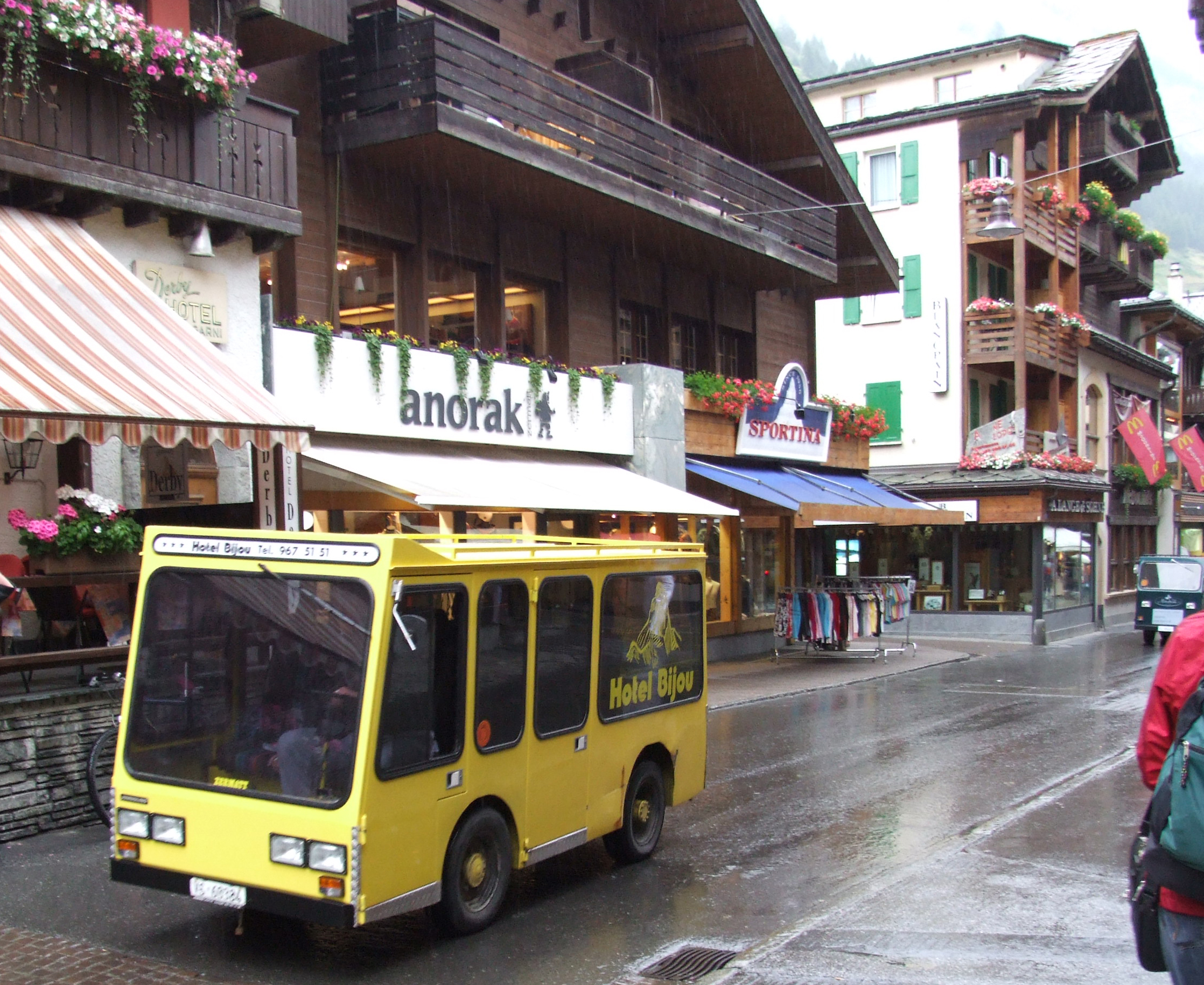
Electric cars in the streets of Zermatt

To prevent air pollution that could obscure the town's view of the Matterhorn, the entire town is a combustion-engine-car–free zone. Almost all vehicles in Zermatt are battery driven and almost completely silent. Electric vehicles are allowed for local commerce. The Cantonal police can issue a permit which allows residents to drive and park at the northern outskirts and for the permission to bring combustion-engine vehicles in to the town such as construction vehicles. Emergency and municipal vehicles, (fire trucks, ambulances, police etc.) generally use combustion engines, although even some of these are non-combustion (garbage trucks, etc.).

Passenger vehicles operating within Zermatt include small electric shuttles provided by hotels to carry visitors from the main train station (or the taxi transfer point just outside town) to the hotel properties, "electro" taxis operated by four major Zermatt families, and "electro" buses, which serve two routes: one between the major hotel areas and the stations of the various ski-lifts, and the other following a similar route but also serving the more rural "suburb" of Winkelmatten. Horse-drawn carriages can also be found; some are operated by hotels and others are available for hire.

Most visitors reach Zermatt by the rack-assisted railway train from the nearby town of Täsch (Zermatt shuttle). Trains also depart for Zermatt from farther down the valley at Visp and Brig, which are on the main Swiss rail network. The town also has a heliport (ICAO: LSEZ) and a local helicopter operator, Air Zermatt, which also provides alpine rescue services.

In 2007, a project group was formed to evaluate options for development of the local transportation network (as the "electro" buses do not have enough capacity). The results of this study are published in the December 2007 edition of Zermatt Inside. The six options explored are a coaster, a funicular, a metro, moving sidewalks, a gondola and more "electro" buses.

In 2019 work started to improve access on the Kirchbrücke – one of the most popular places to photograph the Matterhorn. The viewing area will be widened to keep tourists off the road and away from electric vehicles. The project should be complete by autumn 2019.

The nearest airports that international air travellers to Zermatt can avail of from Switzerland are Sion Airport (SIR), which is 85 km away from the resort, Zurich Airport (ZRH), around 250 km away, and Geneva Airport (GVA), also 250 km away. Other nearby airports in Italy include Milan Malpensa (MXP), with a distance of around 180 km from Zermatt, and Milan Linate (LIN), almost 255 km away.

=== Skiing in Zermatt ===
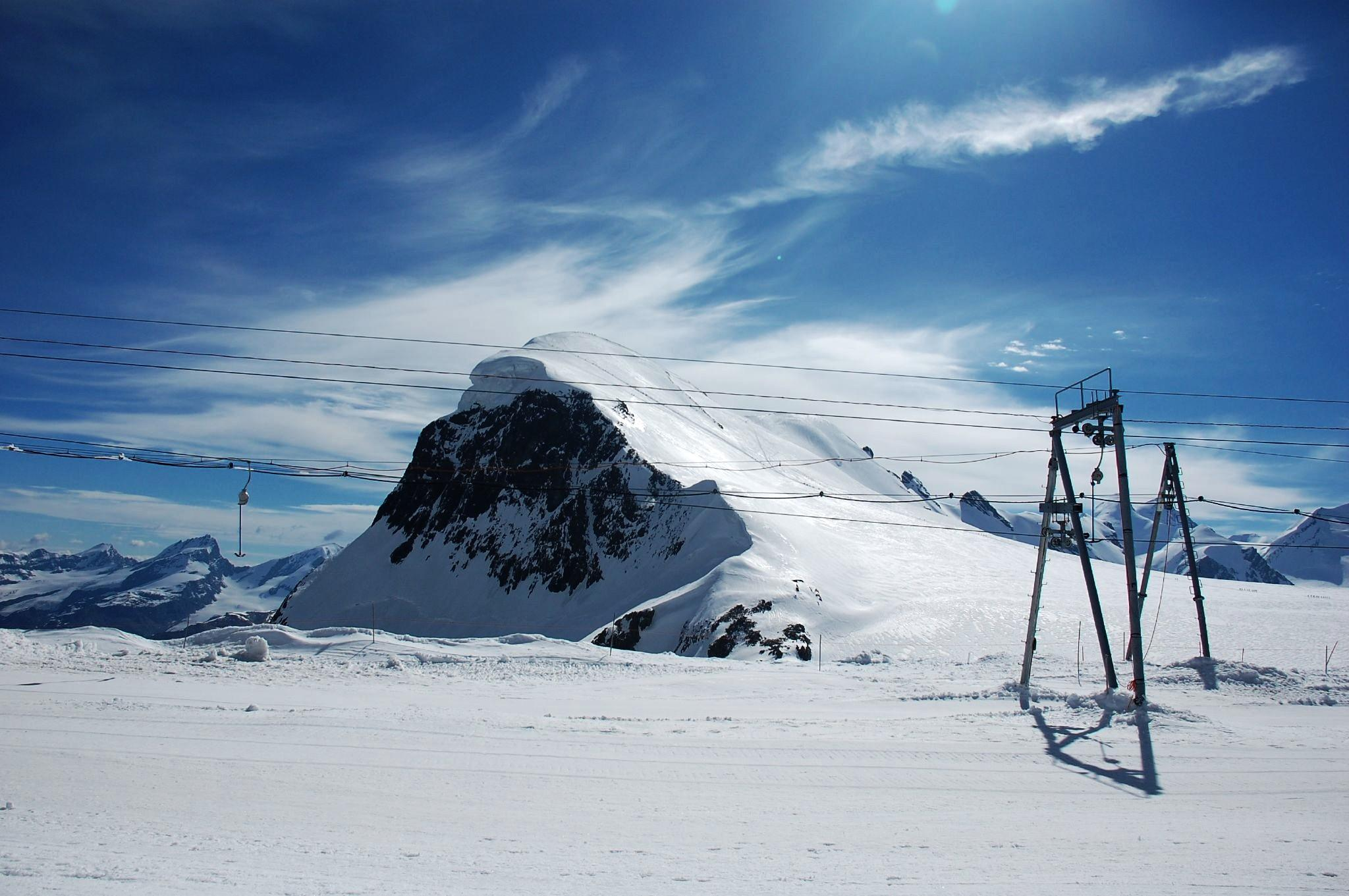
Ski area on the Breithorn plateau, 3,900 m

Zermatt is known throughout the world for its skiing, especially Triftji for its moguls. The high altitude results in consistent skiing continuously throughout the summer.

Skiing in Zermatt is split up into four areas: Sunnegga, Gornergrat, Klein Matterhorn and Schwarzsee. There is also a connection to Cervinia and Valtournenche in Italy through the Plateau Rosa glacier.

In 2008, Zermatt hosted an "Infinity Downhill Race". The race took place on 13 and 14 December and comprised a course descending from the Matterhorn Glacier Paradise (3,800 m (12,500 ft)) and finished in Zermatt itself (1,600 m (5,200 ft)). The course was 20 kilometres (12 miles) long and featured a 2,200 metres (7,218 feet) descent.

In August 2026, Zermatt temporarily suspended summer skiing because of persistently high temperatures, a lack of nighttime cooling, thunderstorms and deteriorating glacier conditions. The suspension was only the second such summer closure in recent years, after 2022.

=== Sunnegga ===
The Sunnegga Paradise is accessed via the SunneggaExpress funicular railway, followed by a gondola to Blauherd and finally a cable car onwards to the Rothorn (3,103 m) above. The topography of the mountain and the valley tends to keep the Rothorn clear and sunny, even when Zermatt is submerged in cloud.

From Blauherd there is a gondola down to Gant, and from there a connecting cablecar goes to Hohtälli. This cable car and the newer 4-seat chairlift Sunnegga-Findeln-Breitboden provide connections between Sunnegga and Gornergrat. With few steep slopes, this mountain is often used to train younger skiers.

=== Gornergrat ===
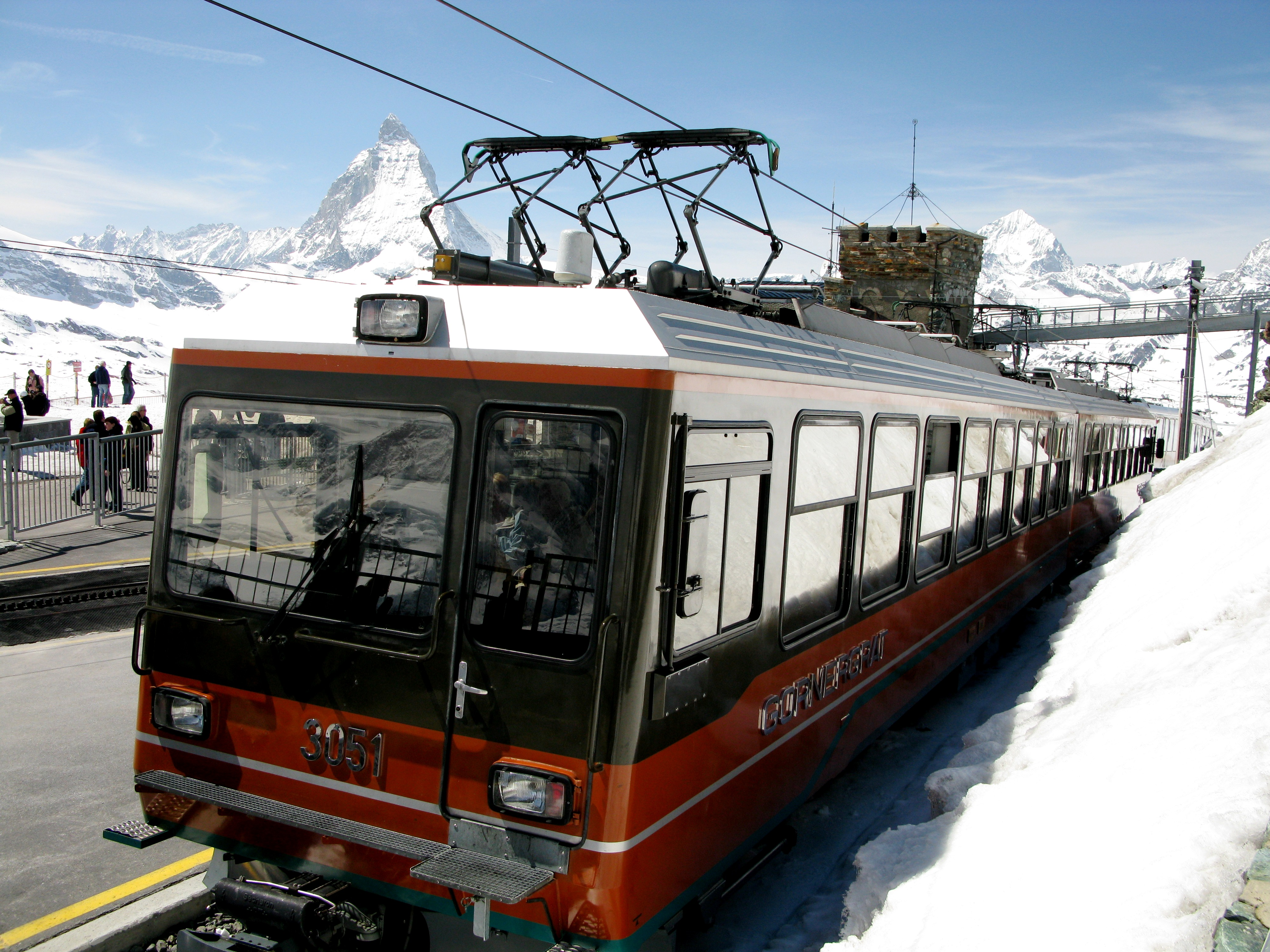
Gornergrat railway station, 3,100 m

The Gornergrat is served by the Gornergrat railway, a 29-minute ride to the Gornergrat peak (3,089 m), via Riffelalp, Rotenboden and Riffelberg, (with limited stops at Findelbach and Landtunnel just above Zermatt). At the summit, the hotel and restaurant have been refurbished and accommodate a shopping centre. Riffelalp station is linked to Riffelalp Resort by a short tramway line named Riffelalptram.

A cable car heads up from Hohtälli to the Rote Nase (3,247 m). This final lift serves a freeride area but can be unreliable as this mountainside requires good snow cover to be skiable. The lifts in this area generally open for the season in late February or early March – cablecar is now permanently closed, with no replacement lift planned. A new slope leading back from Hohtälli to Kellensee just under the Gornergrat replaced this lift to maintain the link from the Rothorn to Gornergrat.

=== Klein Matterhorn / Schwarzsee ===
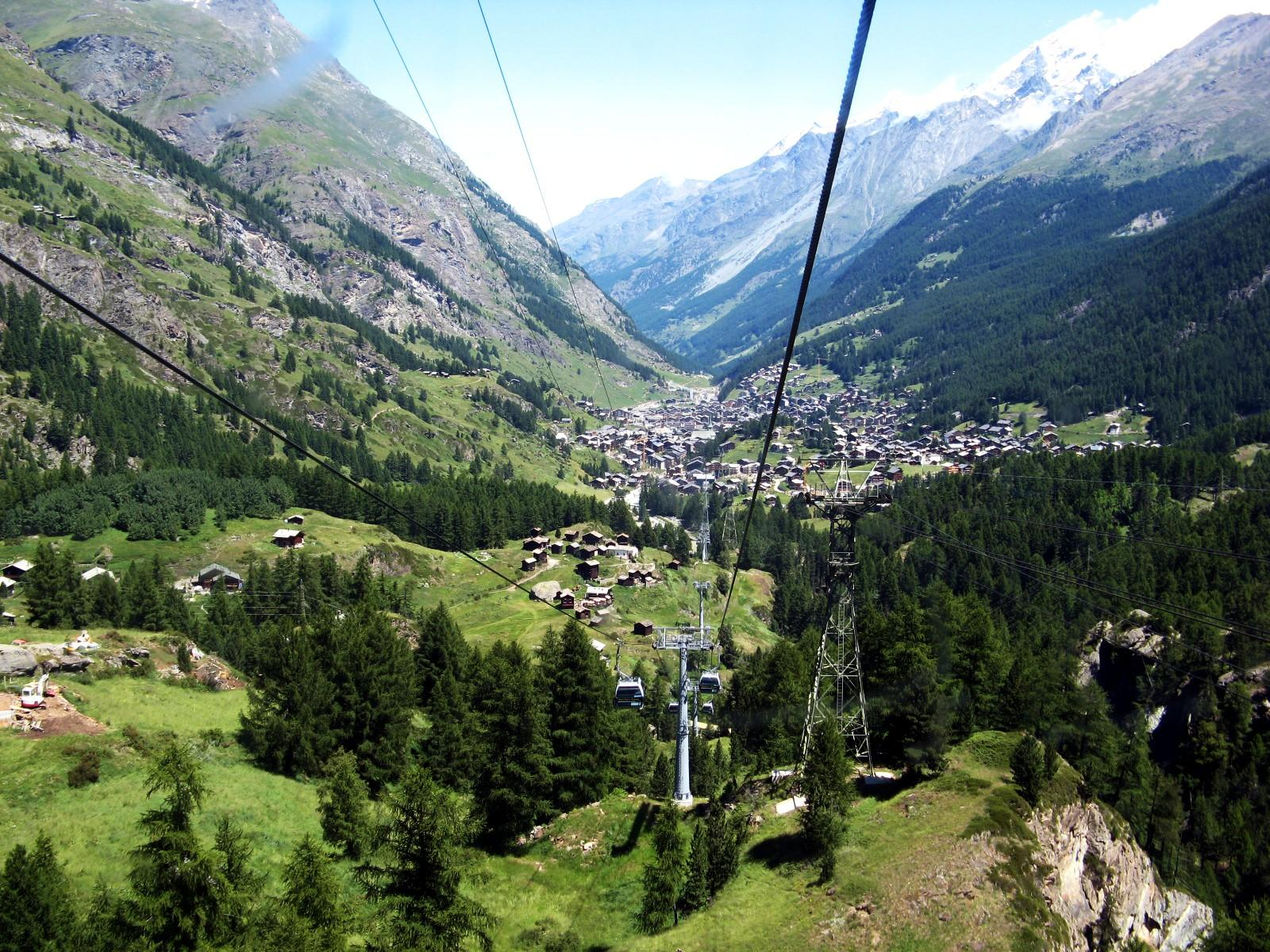
View of Zermatt from the cable car to Furi

Near the southern end of Zermatt, the Matterhorn Express gondola transports passengers up to the interchange station at Furi. From here there is access to Schwarzsee via a gondola to the right, a cable car that leads on to the Trockener Steg midstation (and then on to the Klein Matterhorn); and a new gondola, opened on 18 December 2006, links Furi to Riffelberg on the Gornergrat mountain. This lift addresses one of the most persistent criticisms of Zermatt: that it is very difficult to ski the two sides of the valley without a tiresome trek through Zermatt between the Gornergratbahn and the Matterhorn Express at opposite ends of the town.

Testa Grigia at the top of the Theodul Pass serves as a connection to the Italian ski-resorts of Cervinia and Valtournenche. From the Swiss side it is reachable by skilift only, but from the Italian side by a chairlift and by a cablecar. In March 2019 it was announced that a new lift – the 'Alpine Crossing' – will connect Testa Grigia and Klein Matterhorn from spring 2021. There are customs offices here as well as a small alpine museum.

Zermatt is marketed as an all-year skiing resort, with summer skiing limited to the Theodul Glacier behind the Klein Matterhorn. Whilst strictly true, during the off season in May and June there will tend to be only one or two runs open, and the main glacier area does not open until July.

In operation since 25 October 2003, the Furggsattel six-seater chairlift has twelve (of eighteen) masts that stand directly on the glacial ice of the Theodul Glacier – a first for Switzerland.

The new CHF52 million 3S Glacier Ride Cable Car from the resort to Klein Matterhorn was opened on 29 September 2018. It has an uplift capacity of 2000 people per hour and takes just 9 minutes to reach the top using 25 cabins, each with 28 seats.

=== History of the lift system ===
- 1898 Start of summer operation of Gornergratbahn.
- 1928 Gornergrat Bahn introduces a twice-daily winter sports service to Riffelalp.
- 1939 Development of Theodul area from Breuil Cervinia to Testa Grigia.
- 1942 Zermatt-Sunnegga skilift (summer: foot lift, replaced by chairlift in 1967).
- 1946 Weisti trainer skilift (moved to Riffelberg in 1969). Zermatt-Sunnegga sideways-facing chairlift (replaced by funicular in 1980).
- 1947 Sunnegga-Blauherd skilift (replaced by cable car in 1967).
- 1955 Cableway Plan Maison-Furgghorn (discontinued 1992).
- 1956 Suspension lift Gornergrat-Hohtälli (Discontinued in the summer of 2007). Skilift Riffelberg (replaced by chairlift in 2003). Skilift Furi (discontinued 1960). Chairlift Findeln-Sunegga (due to be replaced in the summer of 2007).
- 1957 Suspension lift Zermatt-Furi (replaced in 2023).
- 1958 Suspension lift Hohtälli-Stockhorn (due to be discontinued in the summer of 2007). Furi-Schwarzsee suspension lift (replaced by cable car lift 2002).

Aerial view (1964)

- 1960 Skilift Garten (discontinued 2003).
- 1962 Suspension lift Furgg-Schwarzsee (replaced by group turnaround lift in 1991).
- 1963 Skilift Hornli.
- 1964 Suspension lift Furi-Furgg (replaced by Matterhorn Express in 2002). Theodullift (replaced by extension of Gandegglift 2003). Skilift Triftji-RoteNase
- 1965 Furgg-Trockener Steg suspension lift. Skilift National (replaced by chairlift Patrullarve 1989).
- 1967 Cable car lift Sunnegga-Blauherd (replaced by combi system in 2005). Suspension lift Blauherd-Rothorn (replaced in 1996). Skilift Furggsattel (replaced by a chairlift in 2003). Skilift Eisfluh (replaced by chairlift in 2001). Passlift (replaced by extension to Gandegglift 2003).
- 1968 Platform skilift Kumme (replaced by chairlift 1982). Skilift Gandegg (extended and renovated in 2003).
- 1971 Cable Car Gant-Blauherd. Skilift Gant-Platte (discontinued 2002). Skilift Riffelberg-Gifthittli (replaced by chairlift in 2003). Skilift Testa Grigia I.
- 1979 Cable Car Trockener Steg-Klein Matterhorn.
- 1980 Funicular Zermatt-Sunnegga. Skilift Testa Grigia II (moved to Plateau Rosa III 2005). Border skilift (Gobba di Rollin/Plateau Breithorn). Skilift Plateau Rosa I.
- 1982 Built: Suspension lift Furi-Trockener Steg. Cable car Zermatt-Furi. Chairlift Kumme-Rothorn.
- 1984 Joint skipass in Zermatt.
- 1986 Suspension lift Hohtälli-Rote Nase.
- 1989 Chairlift Patrullarve-Blauherd.
- 1991 Chairlift Furgg-Sandiger Boden-Theodul Glacier. Skilift Plateau Rosa II. Group turnaround lift Furgg-Schwazsee.
- 1995 Joint skipass Zermatt-Cervinia.
- 1996 Suspension lift Blauherd-Rothorn.
- 1997 T-bar Grenzlift built at Klein Matterhorn; highest lift in Europe. (Still in service)
- 1998 Suspension lift Gant-Hohtälli.
- 1999 Electronic ticketing system introduced.
- 2001 Chairlift Eisfluh-Sunnegga (replacing tow lift).
- 2002 Merger of Zermatt Bergbahnen. Cable car lifts Matterhorn Express (Zermatt-Furi-Schwarzsee).
- 2003 Chairlift Furggsattel Gletscherbahn (Trockener Steg – Furggsattel). Chairlift Gifthittli (Rifelberg – Gifthittli).
- 2005 Combi system (gondola/chairlift) Sunnegga-Blauherd. Passenger lift funicular-Riedweg (discontinued 2007).
- 2006 Suspension lift Furi-Schweigmatten-Riffelberg (Riffelberg Express).
- 2007 End of operations of the Gornergrat – Hohtälli Cable Car.
- 2007 End of operations of the Hohtälli – Stockhorn cable car, replaced by a 2 t-bar lifts (Stockhorn and Triftji) in 2008.
- 2007 Clearing of the skitunnel at Riffelberg, next to Gifthittli lift, increasing the capacity of this slope.
- 2007 Four-seat chairlift Sunnegga-Findeln/Eja and Findeln/Eja-Breitboden opened after construction.
- 2015 Bubble-Chairlift S.B. Hirli opens. (Stafel/Joscht- Hirli)
- 2016 Hublot-Express service Gant-Blauherd opens.
- 2017-2018 Blauherd-Rothorn Cable car temporarily out of service due to unstable ground foundations around Tower 1.
- 2018 Kumme-Rothorn chairlift destroyed by avalanche.
- 2018 Avalanche destroys T-bar Triftji-Rote Nase.
- 2018 Stockhorn T-bar destroyed in Avalanche.
- 2018 The world highest 3S cableway is inaugurated
- 2019 Blauherd – Rothorn Cable Car back in service after summer construction work.
- 2020 Kumme Gondola (replacing chairlift 1982)
- 2023 Testa Grigia Klein Matterhorn 3S cableway (Pedestrian connection between Switzerland and Italy open)
- 2023 Zermatt Furi renewed suspension lift
- 2025 Riffelberg–Gifthittli six-seater chairlift was replaced by a new high-speed eight-seater chairlift

=== Developments ===
The Zermatt Bergbahnen's website mentions a few projects for the following years:

- c. 2024 Breitboden – Rosenritz high speed chairlift (new)
- Unknown ETA new Cable Car Zermatt – Furi (replacing current cable car)
- c.2022 New Gondola system Hohtalli – Rote Nase – Stockhorn (putting Stockhorn in service for the first time in 8 years)
- Unknown ETA High-Speed Furgg-Garten Chairlift (replacing very slow current lift Furgg-Sandiger Boden)

As well as several changes to the slopes, and the placement of new snowmaking installations.

== Coat of arms ==
The blazon of the municipal coat of arms is Gules a lion rampant Or langued of the first on a trimount Vert between two mullets of five Argent in chief.

== Demographics ==
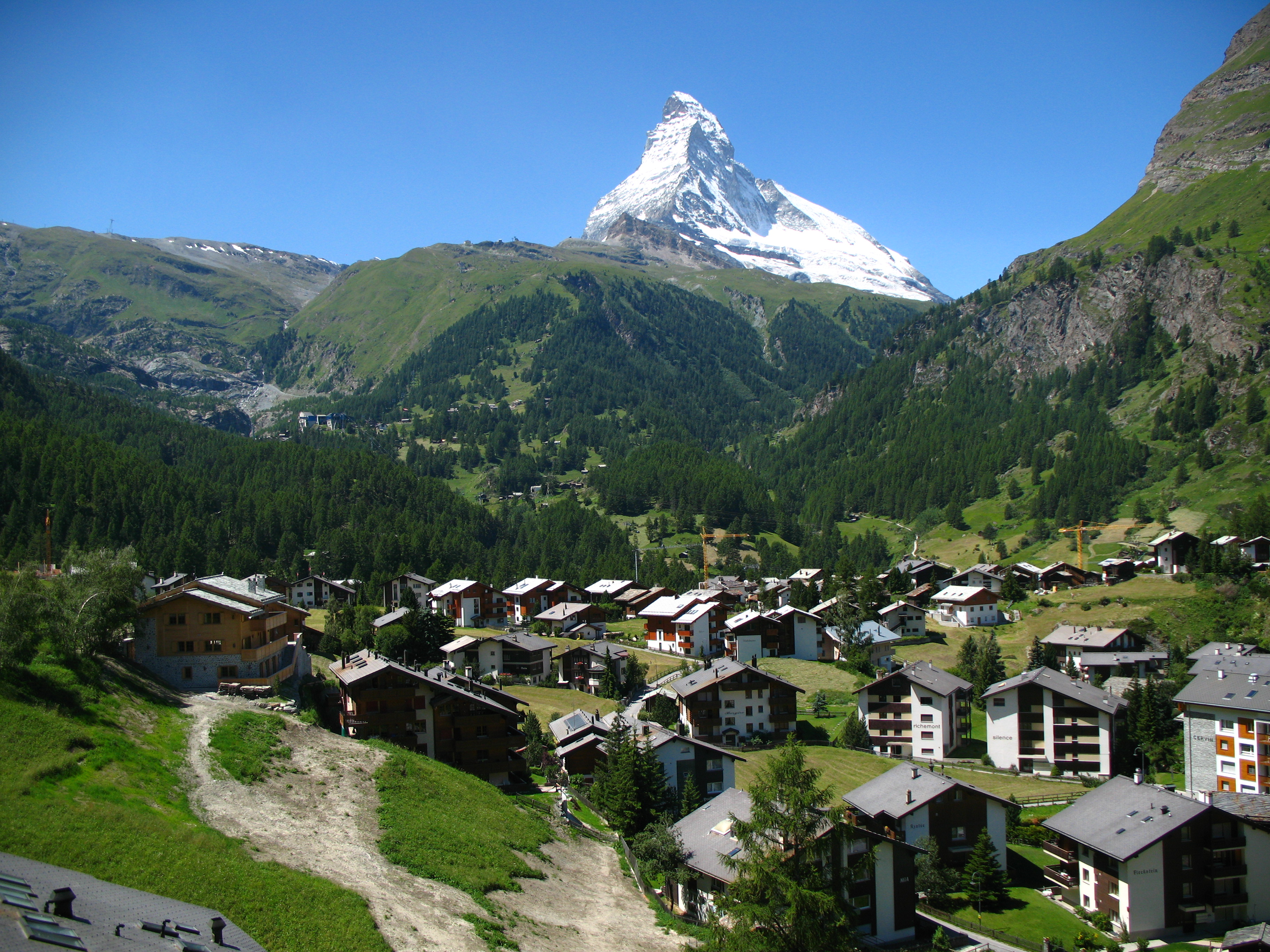
Winkelmatten village near Zermatt

Zermatt has a population of 5,847 as of 2024. As of 2013, 39.0% of the population are resident foreign nationals. Over the last three years (2010–2013) the population has changed at a rate of 0.54%. The birth rate in the municipality, in 2013, was 9.5 while the death rate was 4.9 per thousand residents.

Most of the population (as of 2000) speaks German (4,093 or 68.4%) as their first language, Portuguese is the second most common (719 or 12.0%) and Italian is the third (474 or 7.9%). There are 226 people who speak French and 1 person who speaks Romansh.

As of 2008, the population was 51.6% male and 48.4% female. The population was made up of 1,840 Swiss men (31.6% of the population) and 1,166 (20.0%) non-Swiss men. There were 1,837 Swiss women (31.5%) and 985 (16.9%) non-Swiss women. Of the population in the municipality, 2,214 or about 37.0% were born in Zermatt and lived there in 2000. There were 720 or 12.0% who were born in the same canton, while 774 or 12.9% were born somewhere else in Switzerland, and 2,039 or 34.1% were born outside of Switzerland.

As of 2013, children and teenagers (0–19 years old) make up 18.5% of the population, while adults (20–64 years old) are 69.5% and seniors (over 64 years old) make up 12.0%.

As of 2000, there were 2,763 people who were single and never married in the municipality. There were 2,830 married individuals, 207 widows or widowers and 188 individuals who are divorced.

As of 2000, there were 2,441 private households in the municipality, and an average of 2.2 persons per household. There were 921 households that consist of only one person and 128 households with five or more people. In 2000, a total of 2,167 apartments (52.1% of the total) were permanently occupied, while 1,890 apartments (45.4%) were seasonally occupied and 103 apartments (2.5%) were empty. Of the 977 inhabited buildings in the municipality, in 2000, about 22.8% were single family homes and 45.5% were multiple family buildings. Additionally, about 10.8% of the buildings were built before 1919, while 14.4% were built between 1991 and 2000. In 2012 the rate of construction of new housing units per 1000 residents was 13.65. The vacancy rate for the municipality, in 2014, was 0.28%.

The historical population is given in the following chart:

== Notable people ==
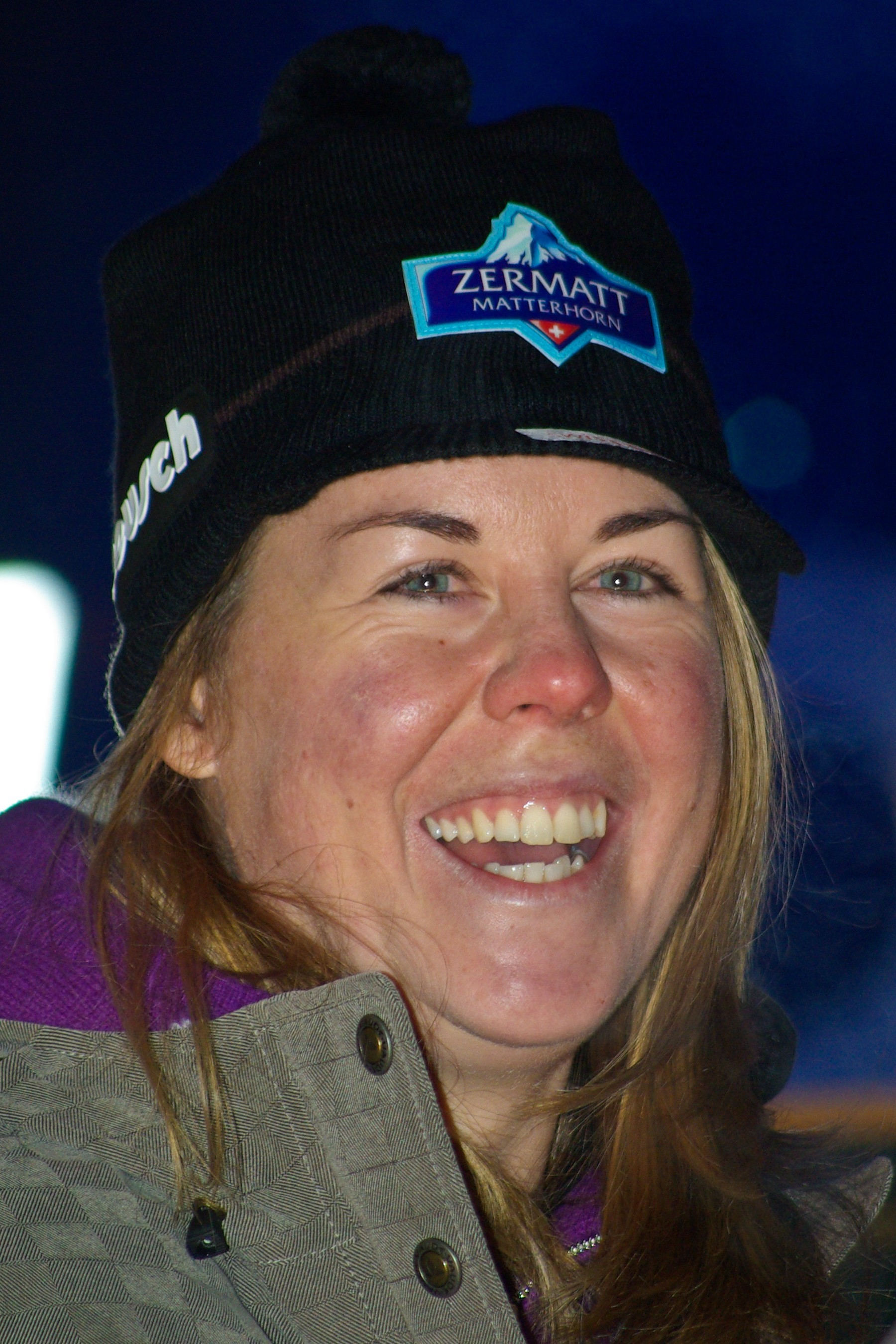
Fränzi Aufdenblatten, 2009

- John Douglas, 9th Marquess of Queensberry (1844–1900), Scottish nobleman, eponym of the Queensberry Rules, linked with Oscar Wilde, wrote The Spirit of the Matterhorn in Zermatt in 1873
- Douglas Robert Hadow (1846–1865), a British novice mountaineer who died on the descent after the first ascent of the Matterhorn, buried in Zermatt
- Ulrich Inderbinen (1900–2004), Swiss mountain climber.
- Otto Furrer (1903 in Zermatt – 1951), a Swiss alpine skier and cross-country skier and world champion
- Beate Hermelin (1919–2007), a German-born experimental psychologist, pioneer in the experimental study of autism, took annual holidays in Zermatt
- Bernhard Perren (1928 in Zermatt – 1960), a Swiss alpine skier and mountain guide
- Anni-Frid Lyngstad (born 1945), Norwegian-Swedish singer-songwriter, lead singer of ABBA, lived in Zermatt between 2000 and 2019.
- Martin Schenkel (1968 – 2003 in Zermatt), a Swiss television actor and musician, starred in Swiss German TV productions
- Max Julen (born 1961 in Zermatt), Olympic Champion Giant Slalom Sarajevo 1984
- Fränzi Aufdenblatten (born 1981 in Zermatt), a retired Swiss World Cup alpine ski racer
- Martin Anthamatten (born 1984 in Zermatt), a Swiss ski mountaineer and mountain runner
- Andreas Steindl (born 1989 in Zermatt), a Swiss mountain climber, ski mountaineer and mountain guide
- Patrick Aufdenblatten (born in Zermatt), climber, Matterhorn Nordwall Bonnatti route record, 1st 9a repeats in Canada

== Heritage sites of national significance ==
The petroglyphs and prehistoric grinding stone at Hubelwäng is listed as a Swiss heritage site of national significance.

== Politics ==
In the 2011 federal election the most popular party was the CVP with 43.7% of the vote. The next three most popular parties were the SVP (33.3%), the FDP (14.1%) and the SP (4.1%). In the federal election, a total of 1378 votes were cast, and the voter turnout was 48.1%.

In the 2007 federal election the most popular party was the CVP which received 68.98% of the vote. The next three most popular parties were the SVP (19.61%), the SP (6.3%) and the FDP (3.51%). In the federal election, a total of 1,326 votes were cast, and the voter turnout was 46.0%.

In the 2009 Conseil d'État/Staatsrat election a total of 1,009 votes were cast, of which 66 or about 6.5% were invalid. The voter participation was 34.4%, which is much less than the cantonal average of 54.67%. In the 2007 Swiss Council of States election a total of 1,289 votes were cast, of which 105 or about 8.1% were invalid. The voter participation was 45.4%, which is much less than the cantonal average of 59.88%.

== Economy ==
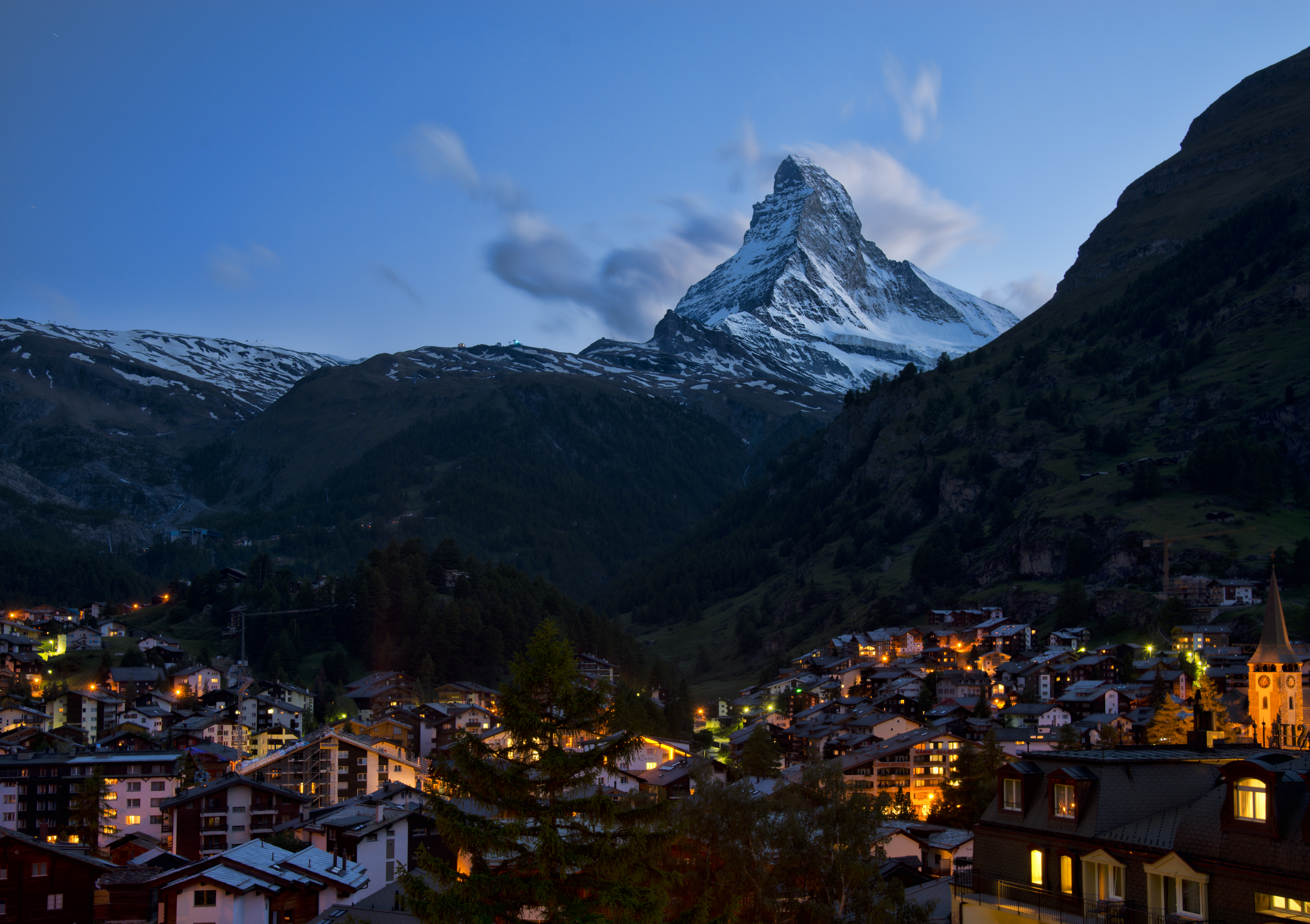
Zermatt at night.

About half of the jobs in Zermatt are in the hotel and restaurant industry.

As of 2012, there were a total of 6,370 people employed in the municipality. Of these, a total of 42 people worked in 19 businesses in the primary economic sector. The secondary sector employed 521 workers in 68 separate businesses. Finally, the tertiary sector provided 5,807 jobs in 736 businesses. In 2013 a total of 13.7% of the population received social assistance.

In 2008 the total number of full-time equivalent jobs was 4,261. The number of jobs in the primary sector was 20, all of which were in agriculture. The number of jobs in the secondary sector was 538 of which 83 or (15.4%) were in manufacturing and 385 (71.6%) were in construction. The number of jobs in the tertiary sector was 3,703. In the tertiary sector, 531 or 14.3% were in wholesale or retail sales or the repair of motor vehicles, 477 or 12.9% were in the movement and storage of goods, 2,178 or 58.8% were in a hotel or restaurant, 38 or 1.0% were in the information industry, 54 or 1.5% were the insurance or financial industry, 116 or 3.1% were technical professionals or scientists, 56 or 1.5% were in education and 87 or 2.3% were in health care.

In 2000, there were 744 workers who commuted into the municipality and 89 workers who commuted away. The municipality is a net importer of workers, with about 8.4 workers entering the municipality for every one leaving. Of the working population, 7.1% used public transportation to get to work, and 2.6% used a private car.

== Religion ==
Religion in Zermatt – 2014
Religion	Percent
Roman Catholic	80.3%
Reformed Church in Valais	9.1%
Other Religion	5.3%
Unaffiliated/Undeclared	5.3%

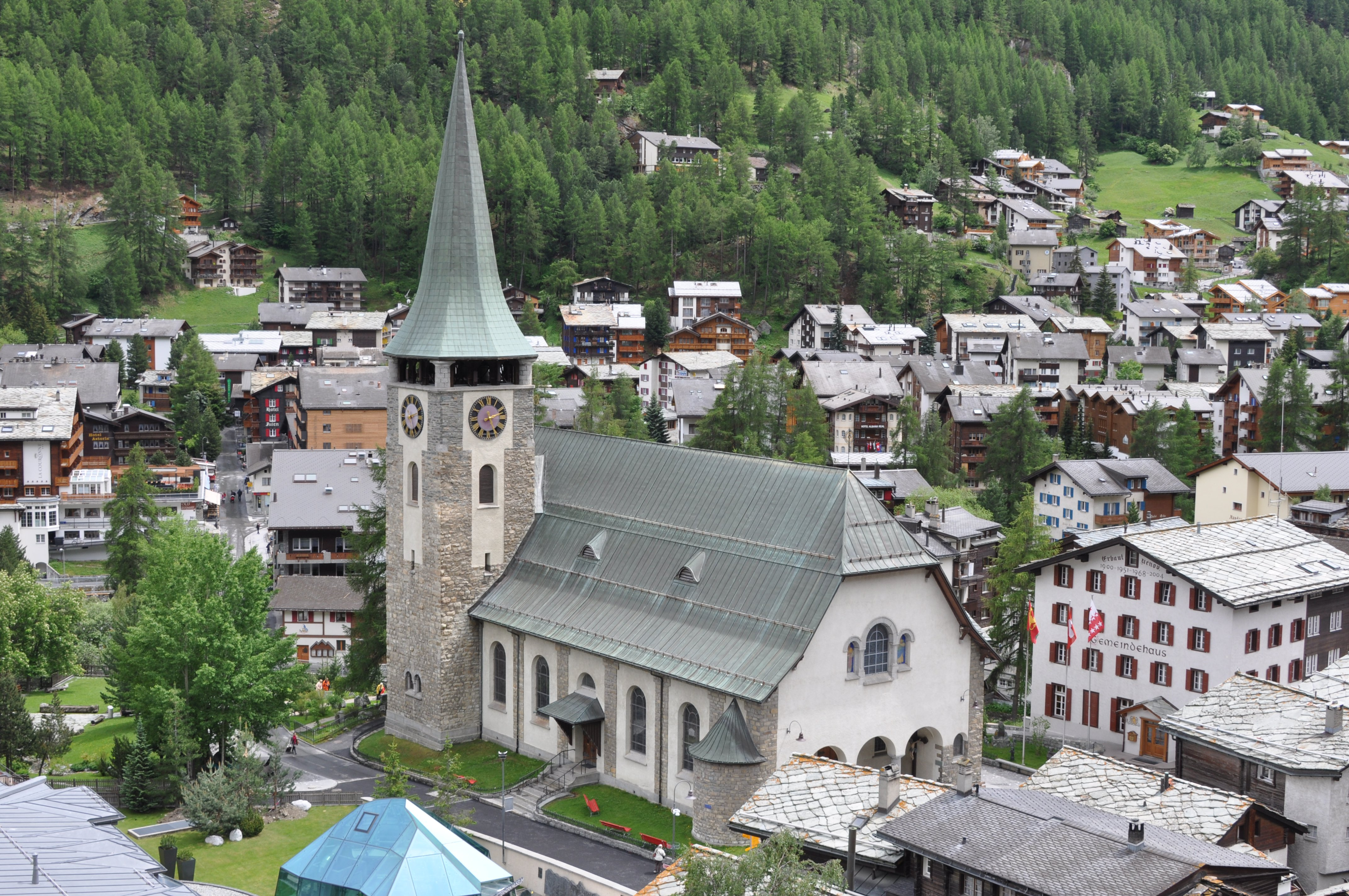
Parish church of St. Mauritius

From the 2000 census, 4,458 or 74.4% were Roman Catholic, while 458 or 7.6% belonged to the Swiss Reformed Church. Of the rest of the population, there were 131 members of an Orthodox church (or about 2.19% of the population), there were 2 individuals (or about 0.03% of the population) who belonged to the Christian Catholic Church, and there were 59 individuals (or about 0.99% of the population) who belonged to another Christian church. There were 4 individuals (or about 0.07% of the population) who were Jewish, and 82 (or about 1.37% of the population) who were Muslim. There were 6 individuals who were Buddhist and 4 individuals who belonged to another church. 205 (or about 3.42% of the population) belonged to no church, are agnostics or atheists, and 602 individuals (or about 10.05% of the population) did not answer the question. There is an English Church in Zermatt that was founded in 1870. The Intercontinental Church Society (ICS) provide Anglican chaplains for the English Church for English speakers who work, study or travel overseas.

== Education ==
In Zermatt about 1,988 or (33.2%) of the population have completed non-mandatory upper secondary education, and 470 or (7.8%) have completed additional higher education (either university or a Fachhochschule). Of the 470 who completed tertiary schooling, 51.1% were Swiss men, 21.1% were Swiss women, 14.0% were non-Swiss men and 13.8% were non-Swiss women.

During the 2010–2011 school year there were a total of 677 students in the Zermatt school system. The education system in the Canton of Valais allows young children to attend one year of non-obligatory Kindergarten. During that school year, there 6 kindergarten classes (KG1 or KG2) and 106 kindergarten students. The canton's school system requires students to attend six years of primary school. In Zermatt there were a total of 24 classes and 458 students in the primary school. The secondary school program consists of three lower, obligatory years of schooling (orientation classes), followed by three to five years of optional, advanced schools. There were 219 lower secondary students who attended school in Zermatt. All the upper secondary students attended school in another municipality.

As of 2000, there were 98 students in Zermatt who came from another municipality, while 23 residents attended schools outside the municipality.

== Crime ==
In 2014 the crime rate, of the over 200 crimes listed in the Swiss Criminal Code (running from murder, robbery and assault to accepting bribes and election fraud), in Zermatt was 56.3 per thousand residents. This rate is only 68.7% of the cantonal rate. During the same period, the rate of drug crimes was 7 per thousand residents. This rate is about one and a half times greater than the rate in the district, but is only 68.0% of the rate in the canton and is only 70.7% of the national rate. The rate of violations of immigration, visa and work permit laws was 0.5 per thousand residents. This rate is lower than average, only 71.4% of the low rate in the district and is only 14.3% of the rate in the canton and 10.2% of the rate for the entire country.

== See also ==
- Matterhorn Museum
- List of ski areas and resorts in Switzerland
- Swiss Alps
- Tourism in Switzerland
- Air Zermatt
- Zermatt Neo – Singaporean competitive eater named after Zermatt
