= Matterhorn Museum =

Museum in Zermatt

Coordinates: 46°1′11″N 7°44′46″E

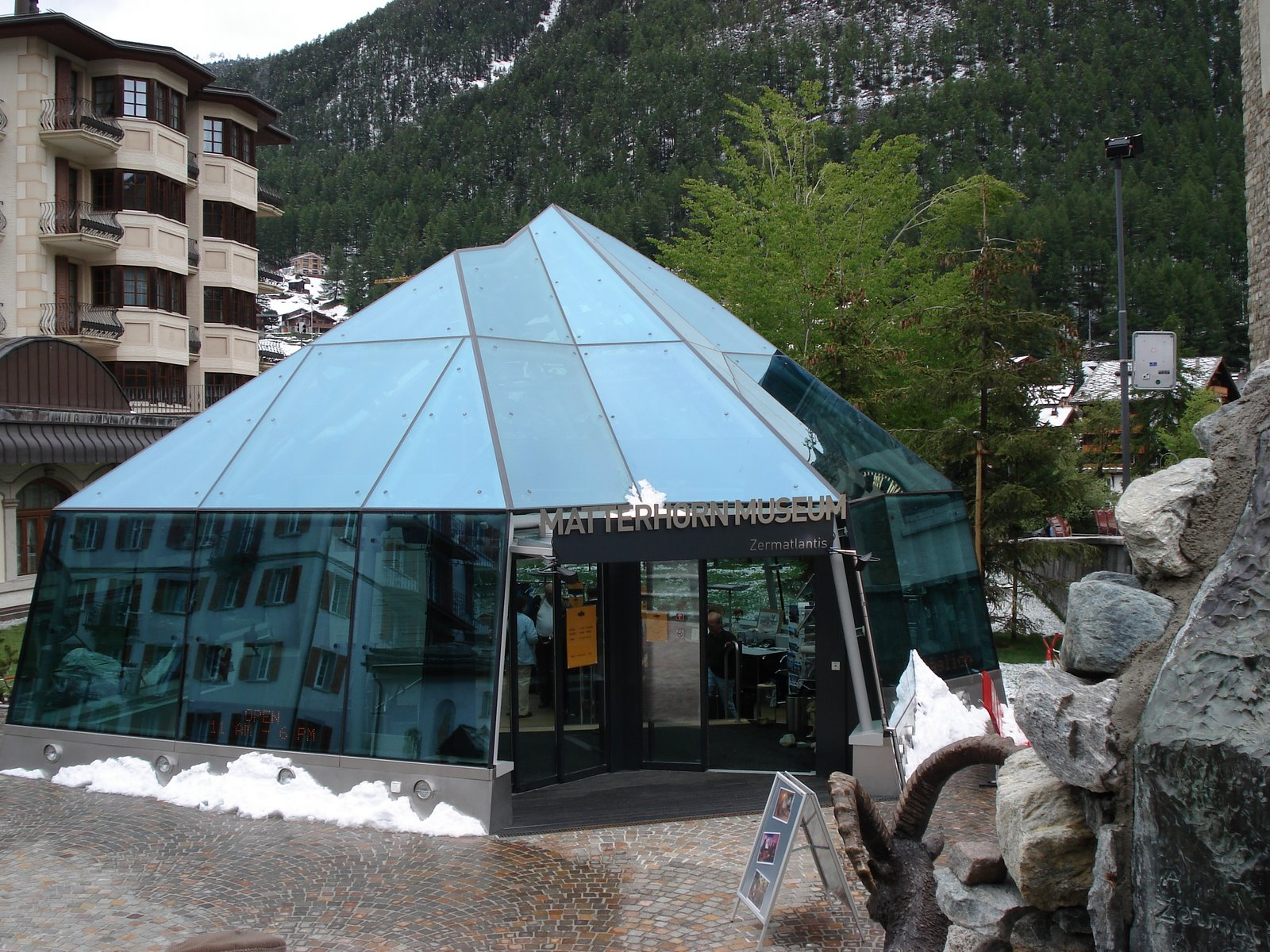
- The entrance of the Matterhorn Museum; due to the limited space in Zermatt, the museum was built underground.
- Location: Zermatt, Switzerland
- Type: Living museum
- Website: zermatt.swiss/en/discover-experience/tradition-culture/museum

The Matterhorn Museum is a cultural-natural museum in Zermatt whose main theme is the Matterhorn. The museum is in the form of a reconstituted mountain village consisting of 14 houses (church, hotel, huts and granaries), and relates the history and development of tourism in the Zermatt area, including the story of the first ascent of the Matterhorn by Edward Whymper and party.

The museum displays one of the two stones that Claude Nicollier took from the summit and brought with him on the Space Shuttle Endeavour STS-61 mission in 1993. The other stone was put back on the summit.

== See also ==
- List of museums in Switzerland
