= Thierry Lang =

Swiss composer and jazz pianist

Thierry Lang (born 1956) is a Swiss composer and jazz pianist.

In 2006, Lang gave a concert in his native village of Romont along with bassist Heiri Kanzig and violinist Didier Lockwood.

He teaches piano and composition at the University of Lausanne in Switzerland. He has recorded jazz music discs with Blue Note Records, among others. In 2008 Lang was awarded a Doctor Honoris Causa from the European University.

== Selected discography ==
- Celebration (2020)
- Serenity (2014)
- Lyoba Revisited (2010)
