= Ernst Cincera =

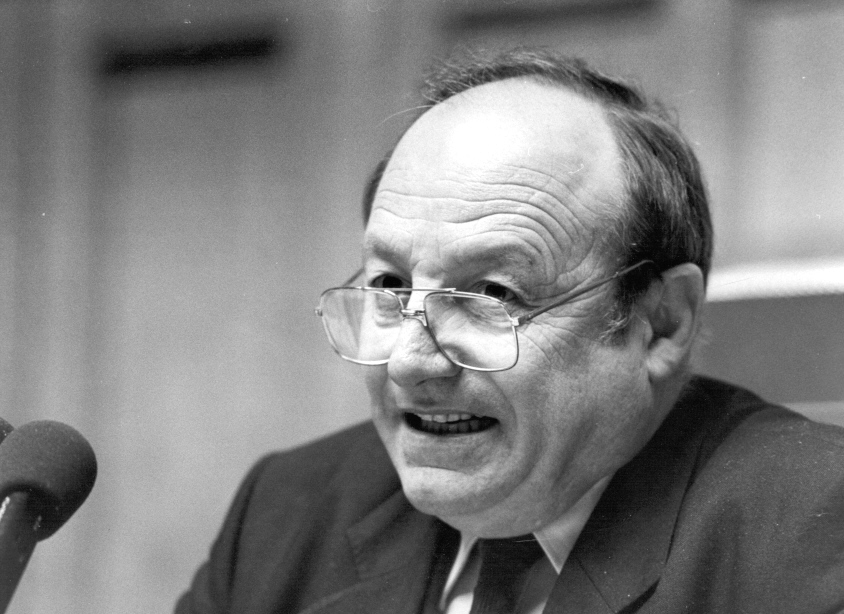
Ernst Cincera

Ernst Cincera (14 May 1928 – 30 October 2004) was a Swiss graphic designer, author and politician of the Free Democratic Party (FDP), known for his private intelligence activities against presumed Communist subversion in Switzerland during the Cold War.

== Biography ==
Cincera trained and worked as an independent graphic designer. He represented the FDP in the parliament of the Canton of Zurich from 1967 to 1971 and was a member of the Swiss National Council from 1983 to 1995.

Beginning in 1972, Cincera established a private network of informers which he used to compile files about some 3,500 politicians, artists, teachers, trade unionists and other persons associated with left-wing politics. He made these files available to business and political leaders to help them identify presumed subversives in their organizations, which damaged the professional career of many people. In 1978, left-wing activists stole part of the files from Cincera's house and made their existence public, which caused a public scandal. Cincera was subsequently cut by the Swiss political and financial establishment, but continued to agitate as a writer and public speaker against what he considered the threat of Communist subversion in Switzerland.

== Works ==
- Unser Widerstand gegen die Subversion in der Schweiz. Athenaeum, Lugano 1976 / 1977, ISBN 3-85532-779-3.
- (as editor) Margarete Buber-Neumann - einer Zeugin des Jahrhunderts zum achtzigsten Geburtstag gewidmet, Auszüge aus Reden. Athenaeum, Lugano 1981, ISBN 3-85532-707-6.
- Moskaus Friedensstrategie oder das andere Gesicht der Friedenstaube. Ein kleines Handbuch zur Auseinandersetzung mit der Friedensbewegung, Schweizerzeit, Flaach 1983 (without ISBN).
- Deutsch nach Marx. Oder die Sprache der Politik: Ein kleines Handbuch über die missbrauchte Sprache, Athenaeum, Lugano 1983, ISBN 3-8553-2710-6.
- with Ursula Speich-Hochstrasser; Fondation PME Suisse (ed.): Ein heiteres, aber wichtiges ABC für Leute, die etwas unternehmen wollen, Stiftung KMU Schweiz, Bern 1997, ISBN 3-952048-60-7.
- 75 Jahre FDP Höngg 1928-2003, Zürich 2003.
