= L'Hom Strom =

Swiss pre-Christian tradition

The Hom Strom (Vallader: l'Hom Strom [lom ˈʃtrɔm]; meaning "the Straw-Man") is a pre-Christian tradition carried out yearly on the first Saturday of February in Scuol, the main inhabited center of the Lower Engadin, Graubünden, Switzerland.

== The event ==
This tradition takes place every first Saturday of February. In the morning young people from the village gather a whole bunch of straw taken from local farms in order to build a big straw man in the town square. In days gone by the four areas of town would each build their own Hom Strom and guard it against kids form the other areas of town in order to avoid that the latter would set their Hom Strom on fire before the beginning of the main event.

In the afternoon the Hom Strom gets carried to Gurlaina (an uninhabited area of the town). In the evening, after darkness setting, usually at around 8:00 pm, the Hom Strom gets set on fire: his burning at the stake symbolizes the approaching end of Winter and gets accompanied by locals singing traditional songs.

At the end of the burning ceremony attending locals sing the fourth stanza of the song Hom Strom written in the 1950s by Men Rauch, born and raised in Scuol, where a Christian adaptation is easily recognizable:

Las flommas van in ot,
portond al Segner lod,
chi’ns dosta dal malom,
eviva nos Hom Strom!!

The flames that burn up into the sky
give praise to the Lord,
who, in turn, protects us from evil,
long live our straw man!!...

— Taken from the 4th stanza of the Hom-Strom song

== Similar events ==
A similar tradition is carried out every year at the end of January in the neighboring Brianza, Lombardy: Brusa Sgenee (Lombard for 'Burn January'), in which people in small towns get together at the end of January in order to burn at the stake a man made of straw that represents the winter season.
