= Zibelemärit =

Annual market in Berne, Switzerland

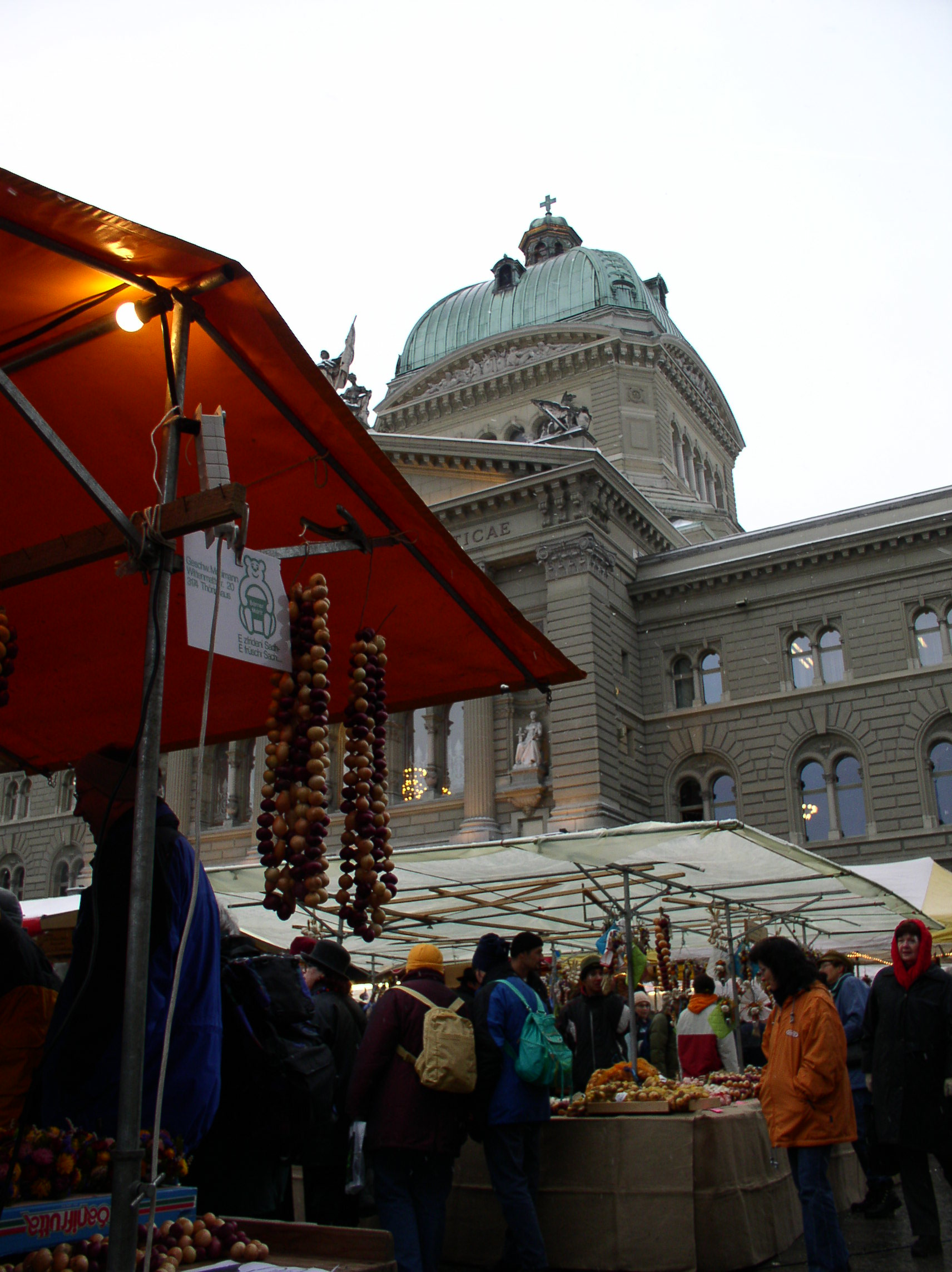
Zibelemärit in Bern

The Zibelemärit (Bernese German for “Onion Market”) is the largest market in Bern, Switzerland. It takes place on the fourth Monday in November. It is attended by visitors from Switzerland and neighbouring countries.

== History ==
The Zibelemärit dates back to the mid-19th century. Onions first appeared in official documents around the time railway lines connected growing regions into the city.

A popular legend says that the market is much older, originating after a fire devastated Bern in 1405. According to the tale, farmers from nearby areas, especially Fribourg, helped with the cleanup and were rewarded with the right to sell their produce in the city. However, historical evidence shows that an autumn market was only formally introduced in 1439, and vegetables were already permitted for sale at Bern's weekly markets.

== Description ==
Onions are the main products sold at the Zibelemärit. Bernese farmers offer decorative onion braids, wreaths, and figurines, along with a range of onion-based foods such as Zwiebelkuchen (onion pie), Zwiebelsuppe (onion soup), Zwiebelpizza, and bratwurst with onions, and mulled wine. Visitors can also find traditional fair treats such as roasted almonds, Magenbrot, and cotton candy.

The Zibelemärit officially begins at 6:00 in the morning and ends at 18:00, though the first sales often take place as early as 4:00. Thousands of people visit Bern's old town during the day. A confetti battle, known as the "Konfettischlacht", takes place in the afternoon as part of the festivities.

The market attracts tens of thousands of visitors, with around 50,000 kilograms of onions typically sold. However, the 2021 event saw reduced stalls and attendance due to the COVID-19 pandemic, with only about 20,000 kilograms available and a one-third reduction in the number of stands.

== See also ==
- Culture of Switzerland
- Swiss cuisine
- Swiss folklore
