= Dietrich Schwanitz =

German writer and literary scholar

Dietrich Schwanitz (April 23, 1940 – December 17, 2004) was a German writer and literary scholar. He became known to larger audiences after publishing the bestselling campus novel Der Campus in 1995.

== Life ==
Schwanitz's parents were teaching and living in the northern Ruhr area. In the late phase of World War II his mother send him with help of the Red Cross to Switzerland to escape the bombing raids in war torn Germany. In Switzerland Schwanitz stayed for six years with Mennonite mountain farmers rather isolated from society and without attending a school. He returned to his parents in 1950 and a school director who took a liking to him (seeing him as a modern "Kaspar Hauser") got him accepted directly into a gymnasium (highschool) and helped him to catch up with the curriculum. Schwanitz graduated ultimately as best of his class and went on to pursue English studies, history and philosophy at universities in Münster, London, Philadelphia and Freiburg. In 1971 he received his PhD from the Albert Ludwig University in Freiburg for his thesis on George Bernard Shaw. In 1978 he became a tenured professor for English studies at the University of Hamburg where he stayed until his early retirement in 1997 due to health issues.

After his retirement Schwanitz moved to Southern Germany. He continued to write and in 2001 he purchased the Salmen in Hartheim am Rhein, a restaurant with a theater stage. Schwanitz planned to turn it into a cultural center and had its theater room painted with Shakespearean motives. He was found dead in the Salmen in late December 2004. The police investigation concluded that there was no indication of a crime or suicide and that he had died of hypothermia. Originally it was reported that Schwanitz was suffering from Parkinson's disease but after his death it became known that in fact he had suffered from Huntington's disease instead. He was married, and the couple had one son and one daughter.

== Work ==
Schwanitz main academic work during his tenure at the University of Hamburg was applying system theory to literary theory and he published two books on that subject. First his main work Systemtheorie und Literatur. Ein neues Paradigma ("System Theory and Literature. A New Paradigm", 1990) which was later followed by Shakespeare und die Liebe. Ein Beispiel für die Applikation der Systemtheorie auf die Literatur. ("Shakespeare and Love. An Example for the Application of System Theory to Literature", 1996). He also published an introduction into English studies and a cultural history of the English speaking world.

Schwanitz was popular with students as a teacher, in 1980 he had founded the University Players an English theater group that still existed long after he had left the university. The group garnered attraction in 1988 when it performed the play MacBarsch alluding to Uwe Barschel the leading figure in Waterkantgate, one West Germany's biggest political scandals.

In 1995 Schwanitz published Der Campus, which is a campus novel, a genre that didn't really exist in German at the time. It quickly became a bestseller in German speaking countries and was adapted into a movie of the same name in 1998, with Schwanitz acting.

== Books ==
- Georg Bernard Shaw – künstlerische Konstruktion und unordentliche Welt. Dissertation, Frankfurt am Main 1971, ISBN 3-7677-0004-2.
- Systemtheorie und Literatur. Ein neues Paradigma. Westdt. Verl., Opladen 1990, ISBN 978-3531221571.
- Literaturwissenschaft für Anglisten: Das studienbegleitende Handbuch. Hueber, Ismaning 1993, ISBN 3-19-006957-3.
- Englische Kulturgeschichte. Von 1500 bis 1914. Eichborn, Frankfurt am Main 1996, ISBN 978-3821809748.
- Shakespeare und die Liebe. Ein Beispiel für die Applikation der Systemtheorie auf die Literatur. Fernuniversität, Hagen 1996.
- Eine andere Welt. Kindheitserlebnisse bei den Schweizer Täufern. In: Gudrun Schäfer (Hrsg.): Die Speisung der Hunderttausend. Die Hilfe der Mennoniten nach dem Zweiten Weltkrieg. Petra Knecht Verlag, Landau 1997, ISBN 3-930927-30-6, S. 29–36.
- Das Shylock-Syndrom oder die Dramaturgie der Barbarei. Eichborn, Frankfurt am Main 1997, ISBN 3-8218-0970-1.
- Der Campus. Goldmann-Taschenbuch, München 1996, ISBN 3-442-43349-5.
- Der Zirkel: Romantische Komödie. Eichborn, Frankfurt am Main 1998, ISBN 3-8218-0560-9.
- Amoklauf im Audimax. Rowohlt-Taschenbuch, Reinbek 1998, ISBN 3-499-43326-5.
- Bildung. Alles, was man wissen muß. Eichborn, Frankfurt am Main 1999, ISBN 3-8218-0818-7.
- Die Geschichte Europas. Eichborn, Frankfurt am Main 2000, ISBN 3-8218-0859-4.
- Männer: Eine Spezies wird besichtigt. Eichborn, Frankfurt am Main 2001, ISBN 3-8218-0858-6.
- Shakespeares Hamlet und alles, was ihn für uns zum kulturellen Gedächtnis macht. Eichborn, Frankfurt am Main 2006, ISBN 3-821-85579-7
