= Knabenschiessen =

Swiss shooting competition in Zürich

Coordinates: 47.35166°N 8.50966°E

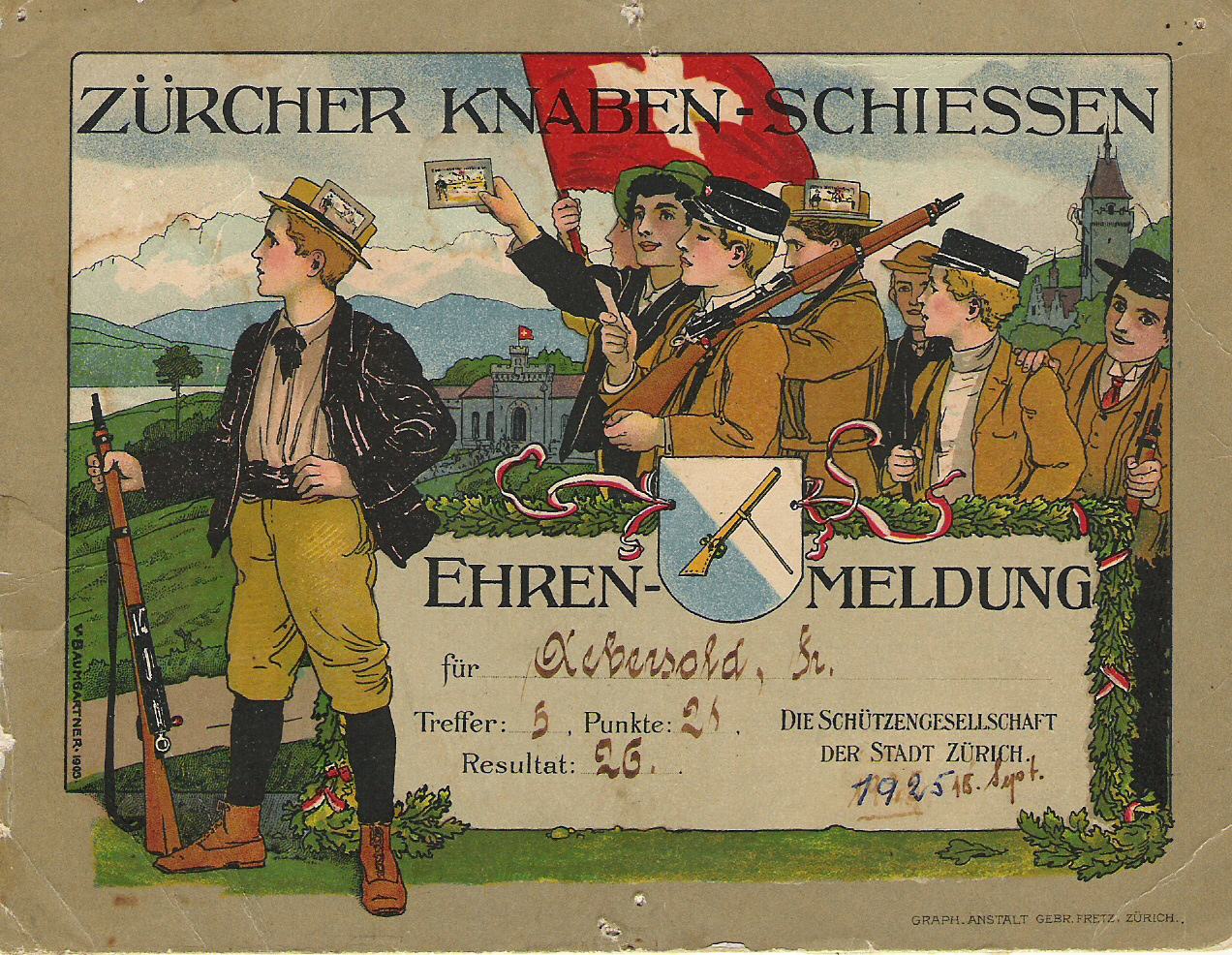
1925 certificate of participation (recording 26 out of the maximum 35 points reached). The rifles depicted are Schmidt–Rubin, in service from 1889 to 1953.

Knabenschiessen is a traditional target shooting competition in Zurich. It was first officially held in 1889, although the tradition goes back to the 17th century.

The competition is open to 13- to 17-year-olds living, studying, or completing apprenticeships in the canton of Zurich. At first, only boys taking a marksmanship course for defence purposes could participate. Girls were permitted from 1991, the year of Switzerland’s 700th anniversary.

Knabenschiessen takes place each September. Monday is a local public holiday, and the three-day festival has food and market stalls, live music, and a fun fair. It was cancelled in some years because of war or economic hardship.

There have been calls to change the event. In 1990, some called for replacing the shooting competition with a broader youth festival. The proposal was narrowly rejected in a 1992 vote, and the competition continued in its existing form.

As of 2010, approximately 5,000 teenagers took part in the competition each year, aiming to win the title of Schützenkönig or Schützenkönigin. Participants used the Sturmgewehr 90 rifle and were required to shoot under the supervision of trained instructors. The accompanying fair, held on the Albisgütli grounds, attracted up to 300,000 visitors over the course of the event. Winners and finalists have occasionally received prizes such as cash awards and rides in a Super Puma army helicopter.
