= Ulrich Inderbinen =

Swiss mountain climber and mountain guide (1900–2004)

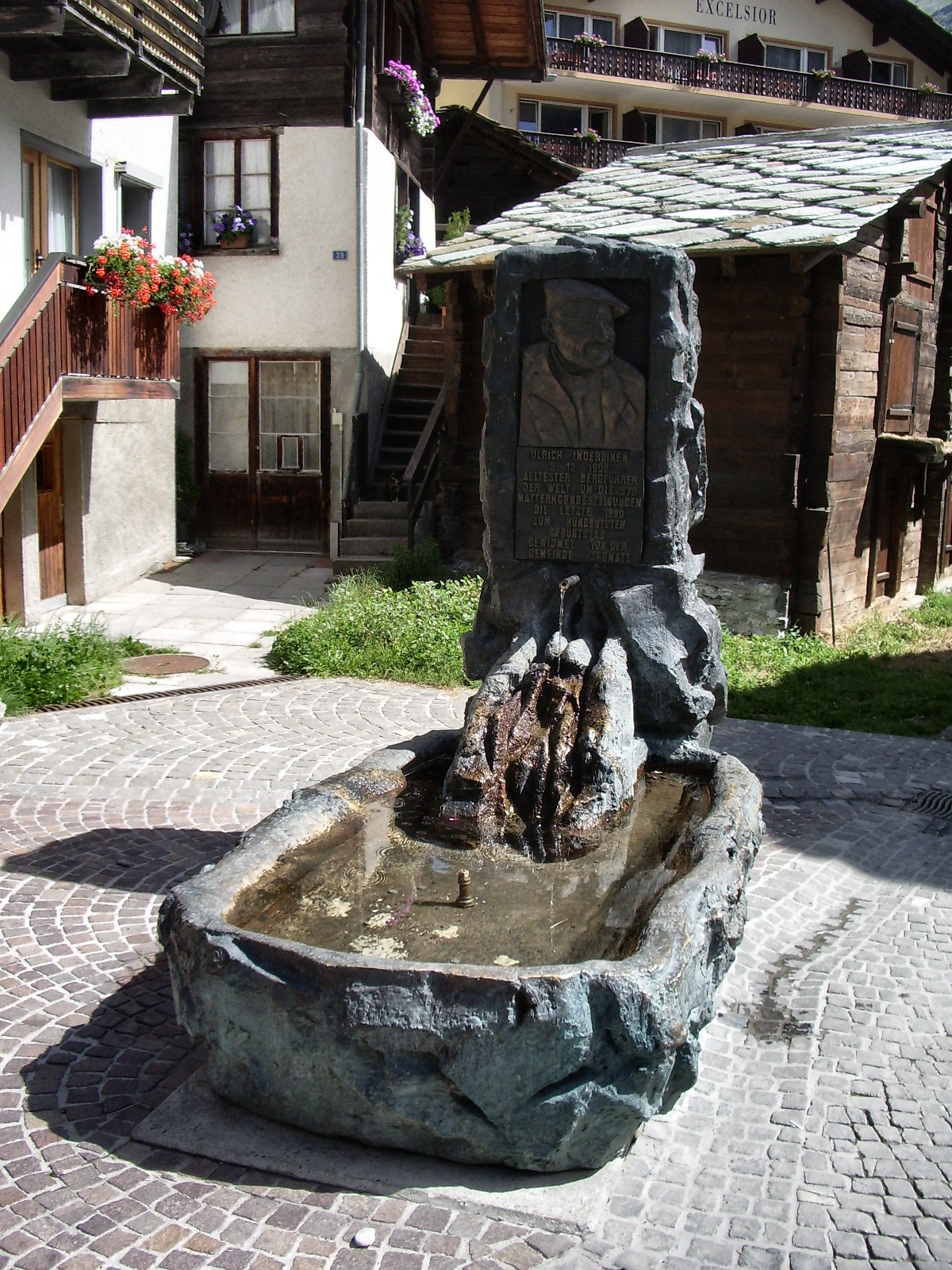
The Inderbinen-Brunnen, a fountain dedicated to Ulrich Inderbinen found in Zermatt, Switzerland.

Ulrich Inderbinen (3 December 1900 in Zermatt, Valais – 14 June 2004) was a Swiss mountain guide famous for his longevity and love for mountain climbing. He had been on the top of Matterhorn over 370 times and made his last ascent of it when he was 90. Though he was not the first to summit the Matterhorn, he may have done it the best. His fame laid not in conquering mountains but safely guiding visitors to the top.

He took up ski-racing for the first time at the age of 82 when he discovered that he was the only competitor in his age group for the local annual ski guides' race.
