= Magdalena Martullo-Blocher =

Swiss billionaire businesswoman

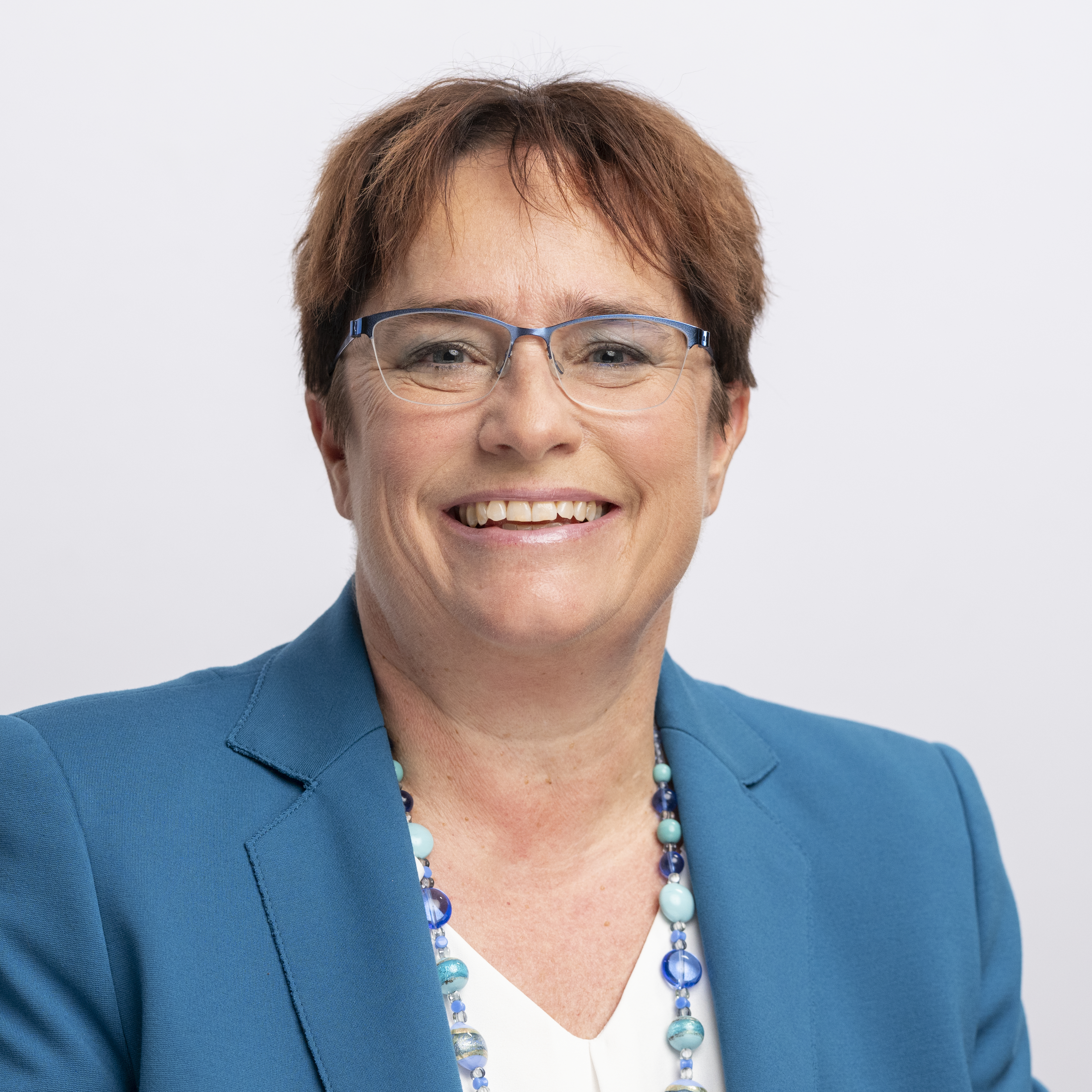
- Official portrait, 2023

Member of the National Council (Switzerland)
- Incumbent
- Assumed office 30 November 2015
- Constituency: Canton of Grisons

Personal details
- Born: Magdalena Blocher; 13 August 1969 (age 57) Männedorf, Zürich, Switzerland
- Party: Swiss People's Party
- Spouse: Roberto Martullo (m. 1999)
- Children: 3
- Parent: Christoph Blocher
- Relatives: Blocher family Christoph Blocher; Markus Blocher
- Education: University of St. Gallen (Licentiate II)
- Occupation: Industrialist, politician

Magdalena Martullo (German pronunciation: [maɡdaˈleːna marˈtullo];Italian pronunciation: [maɡdaˈleːna marˈtullo]; née Blocher; born 13 August 1969) stylized as Magdalena Martullo-Blocher is a Swiss businesswoman, politician and billionaire. She has served on the National Council (Switzerland) for the Swiss People's Party since 2015. Since 2018, she also serves on the executive committee of the Swiss People's Party.

Martullo is the oldest of four children to billionaire businessman and former Swiss Federal Councillor, Christoph Blocher. After her father was elected during the 2003 Swiss federal election, Martullo took-over the management of Ems-Chemie, of which she currently holds the controlling share majority with her sister Rahel Blocher. As of 2026, her net worth is $11.1 billion.

== Early life and education ==
Martullo was born Magdalena Blocher 13 August 1969 in Männedorf on Lake Zurich, Switzerland, the oldest of four children to Christoph Blocher and Silvia Blocher (née Kaiser; born 1945). She is of Swiss and German descent. She was raised with her younger siblings Markus, Miriam and Rahel, living in Feldmeilen (presently part of Meilen).

On her paternal side she is of German descent from Baden-Württemberg. Her father, Christoph Blocher, who hailed from a clergy family, acquired Ems-Chemie in the 1970s and turned it into a successful multinational conglomerate. The family fortune is estimated at $18–19.5 billion (2024). Her maternal family was from Wald ZH, where her grandparents owned a civil engineering firm.

She attended public schools before studying Business Administration at the University of St. Gallen graduating with a licentiate degree which would be an equivalent to a master's degree.

== Professional career ==
From 1994 to 1996, she was Product Manager at Johnson & Johnson. Between 1996 and 2000 she worked as Marketing Manager for the Swiss department at Rivella AG, a soft drink producer.

In January 2001, she joined the Ems Group and eight months later, she became a member of the Board of Directors. Since August 2002, she has been its Vice Chairman. When her father was elected to the Federal Council in the 2003 elections, he handed over his shareholding to his four children. Martullo-Blocher, who was heavily pregnant, took over the management of the company in January 2004. She is now the majority shareholder in the EMS-Chemie corporation.

According to the Bloomberg Billionaires Index, she ranked 255th on the list of the world's richest people, with an estimated wealth of $9.76 billion.

== Political career ==
Martullo-Blocher was elected as a member of the National Council in the 2015 Swiss parliamentary elections on a list of the SVP Graubünden. She is active in the Commission for Economic Affairs and Taxation (WAK) and in her electoral district. Since 2018 she is the Vice-President of the SVP.

She is a member of the Campaign for an Independent and Neutral Switzerland (AUNS).

=== Political views ===
Martello-Blocher is a firm defender of a Swiss neutrality and in view of the Russian invasion of Ukraine, she lamented that Switzerland joined the EU sanctions regime against Russia. Instead she demanded peace negotiations as the sanctions enacted by the European Union (EU) against Russia mainly affected the EU.

== Personal life ==
In 1999, Blocher married Roberto Martullo (born 1962), who was born in Switzerland to Italian parents. They were introduced while she was working at Rivella and he wanted to organize a tour of the manufacturing facility. They have three children.

Martullo resides in Feldmeilen (presently part of Meilen) in her former childhood home.
