= Markus Blocher =

Swiss entrepreneur

- Born: Markus Christoph Blocher; April 16, 1971 (age 55); Männedorf, Zürich, Switzerland
- Education: ETH Zurich (PhD)
- Occupations: Businessman, industrialist
- Years active: 2002 - present
- Known for: Chairman and CEO of Dottikon ES; former controlling shareholder of EMS-Chemie
- Children: 7
- Parent: Christoph Blocher
- Relatives: Blocher family

Markus Christoph Blocher (born April 16, 1971) is a Swiss businessman and billionaire. He is among the richest people of Switzerland, with an estimated net worth of $4 billion by Forbes. Blocher holds a controlling stake in EMS-Chemie and Dottikon ES. He is the son of former Federal Councilor Christoph Blocher and the younger brother of National Councilor Magdalena Martullo-Blocher.

== Early life and education ==
Blocher was born April 16, 1971, in Zürich, Switzerland to Christoph and Silvia (née Kaiser) Blocher. His godmother is Rosmarie Ebner, the wife of the Swiss financier Martin Ebner. His elder sister is now the CEO of EMS-Chemie and a member of the National Council for the Swiss People's Party. He primarily grew up in Feldmeilen on Lake Zurich. He completed a student exchange in the United States and had the desire to join the United States Army in his teens. In 2000, he completed his doctorate at the Swiss Federal Institute of Technology (ETH).

== Career ==
After graduation he worked for three years as a consultant for McKinsey & Company. Since 2002, he worked as Vice President of Special Projects at EMS-Chemie in Domat/Ems. In 2003, he was appointed managing director of Dottikon ES, which at that time still was part of EMS Group. Blocher was responsible for listing the company at the stock exchange in 2005. In November of the same year he exchanged his controlling shares of EMS with his sisters of Dottikon, and became majority owner. Until this day he acts as CEO and chairman of the board. In 2020, he was awarded the title 'Swiss CEO of the year' in the Obermatt ranking.

== Personal life ==
He is married and has seven children. Blocher resides in Wollerau.

== See also ==
- Blocher family
