= Blocher family =

Swiss business and political family

- Swiss business family and political family
- Place of origin: Leidringen, Kingdom of Württemberg
- Founded: Arrival in Switzerland 1833, Meiringen; 193 years ago
- Founder: Johann Georg Blocher (1811–1899)

The Blocher family is a Swiss business and political family hailing from Leidringen in Baden-Württemberg. The arm of Christoph Blocher made a significant fortune in chemicals through EMS-Chemie, and associated firms. The fortune of the family is estimated at 15–16 billion Swiss Francs (approximately $17–18 billion in 2025).

== History ==
The progenitor of the Swiss Blocher family was Johann Georg Blocher (1811–1899), who hailed from Leidringen in the Kingdom of Württemberg. He received a pedagogical education at a teachers seminary in Beuggen near Rheinfelden which followed the principles of Johann Heinrich Pestalozzi. The seminary was financed by the local church and clergy often sent teachers to financially destitute regions who could not afford teachers for their people. He has pioneered education and led several educational institutions in the Bernese Alps, Zürcher Oberland and Baselland.

On 21 October 1861, the municipal council of Schattenhalb, voted for the naturalization of Johann Georg Blocher and his family. For the grant of citizenship, Blocher had to pay 900 Swiss Francs (roughly $25,000 in 2025), which was three years worth of salary of a teacher at the time.

== Family tree ==
- Johann Georg Blocher (1811–1899) (m.) Elise Magdalena Schachtler
  - Johann Gottlob Blocher (1840–1859)
  - Wilhelm Friedrich Blocher (1842–1859)
  - Emanuel Blocher (1844–1920) (m.) Karoline Engler
    - Eduard Blocher (1870–1942) (m.) Elisabeth Hanna Mathilde Wigand (died 1927)
      - Wolfram Blocher (1897–1972) (m.) Ida Baur (1908–1994)
        - Judith Blocher (1932–2024) (m.) Sergio Giovanelli (born 1935)
        - Gerhard Blocher (1934–2016)
        - Sophie Blocher (1935–2002)
        - Christoph Blocher (born 1940) (m.) Silvia Kaiser (born 1945)
          - Magdalena Blocher (born 1969) (m.) Roberto Martullo (born 1962)
            - Samira Martullo (born 2001)
            - Matteo Martullo (born 2003)
            - Tamara Martullo (born 2006)
          - Markus Blocher (born 1971) (m.) Daniela Blocher, six children including:
            - Henri Blocher
          - Miriam Blocher (born 1975), married to Matthias Baumann, two children.
          - Rahel Blocher (born 1976), never married and no children.
        - Brigitte Yvonne Blocher (1945–2020)
    - Hermann Blocher (1872–1942)
    - Eugen Blocher (1882–1964) (m.) Bertha Strübin
  - Hermann Blocher (1846–1846)
  - Elisabetha Blocher (1848–1851)
  - Agnes (1851–1853)
  - Alfred Blocher (1854–1931) (m.) Maria Emma Elisabeth Hänni (1861–1918)
    - Luise Maria Magdalena Blocher (born 1882)
    - Katharina Luise Blocher (born 1888)
    - Georg Alfred Blocher (1893–1959)
  - Elisa (born 1861)
