= Peter Sager =

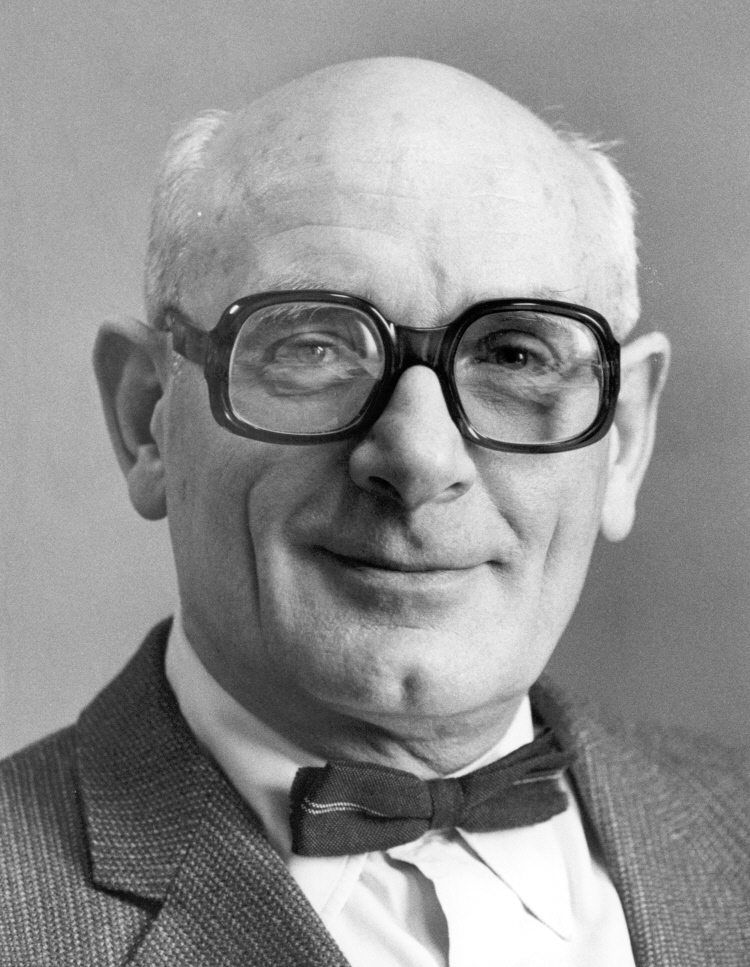
- Born: January 17, 1925; Bern
- Died: July 1, 2006 (aged 81)
- Education: University of Bern
- Occupations: political scientist, economist
- Political party: BGB/SVP (1945–91); LPS (2003–06)

Peter Sager (17 January 1925 – 1 July 2006) was a Swiss political scientist and economist, an expert in Eastern European affairs, as well as a right-leaning conservative and later libertarian politician (BGB, SVP, LPS). He was the founder and former head of the Swiss Library of Eastern Europe and the Swiss Eastern Institute. His political views and anti-communist publications and lectures made him one of the most controversial figures in Switzerland after World War II.

== Education and scientific career ==
Sager was born in Bern. Together with his brother Hans he was raised there by their mother Anna Sager (née Abderhalden). His father Franz Sager who was the general manager of the Gurten brewery, died in a car accident in June 1925. After attending primary and secondary schools, Peter Sager spent a year at the Jomini boarding school in Payerne (known today as the Ecole en Guillermaux). Afterwards he attended the trade school of Lausanne where he graduated in 1945. Already in 1943 he had read Hitler's Mein Kampf asking himself how contemporary international politicians could have underestimated the dangers of Nazism. The counter-offensive of the Red Army in World War II later caused him to read works by Lenin and Stalin.

After beginning university studies in Lausanne, he relocated to Bern where he enrolled at the university to study political economy. In the same year he began to work for Berner Student the university students' newspaper, where he eventually became an editor. In 1947 he joined the Zofingia fraternity whose Bern chapter also included Ahmed Huber and Jean Ziegler. His doctoral thesis in 1952 treated Die theoretischen Grundlagen des Stalinismus und ihre Auswirkung auf die Wirtschaftspolitik der Sowjetunion [The theoretical basics of Stalinism and its effects on the economical policy of the Soviet Union]. After that, Sager visited the Soviet Union Program at Harvard University for two years where Alexander Gerschenkron, Merle Fainsod, Zbigniew Brzezinski, Robert Lee Wolff and Isaiah Berlin were teaching.

He briefly returned to Bern, but would leave again for the US in 1956 where he got a scholarship at Harvard's Russian Research Center. Influenced by the events of the Hungarian Revolution of 1956, he came back to Switzerland prematurely to build a political information centre for the research of communism.

== Swiss Eastern European research ==
Peter Sager was founder of the Swiss Library of Eastern Europe and the Swiss Eastern Institute. While he presided the Library of Eastern Europe only until 1963, he continued to lead the Eastern Institute for more than thirty years from 1959 to 1991. With his numerous publications and lectures – according to Sager himself, he held an estimated 2,000 lectures – he participated importantly in defining the political discourse of Eastern European events in Switzerland.

Sager's original intent was a scientific career, but after the Hungarian uprising he more and more contributed to establishing the Swiss Eastern Institute. It has been noted that this change accentuated the prevalent educational note of Sager's scientific research. Foreign intelligence organisations therefore judged him as "not very scientific, but a first-rate propagandist". Sager was committed to anti-communism and used to polemise against movements like the Swiss New Left, which earned him a reputation of "the Cold War in person". WOZ Die Wochenzeitung wrote in Sager's obituary that, "in case of doubt", Sager had not been obligated to democracy and human rights, "but to Western power. In this respect he was a typical Cold Warrior, albeit clearly less simple than other members of this caste."

Apart from establishing the Library of Eastern Europe since the late 1940s, Sager in the 1950s also began to collect historical western European prints and maps of Russia. This collection called Rossica Europeana has been held by the Swiss Library of Eastern Europe since 2005.

Peter Sager died in Blonay on 1 July 2006.

== Politics ==
In 1945, Peter Sager joined the Party of Farmers, Traders and Independents (German: Bauern-, Gewerbe- und Bürgerpartei, BGB) where his father had already been active. In 1959 and 1979 he ran for a seat in the Swiss National Council for BGB and the conservative Swiss People's Party (SVP) respectively, but was not elected. In 1983 he succeeded to win a seat in the National Council for the SVP of Bern. Sager held this seat until 1991. From 1984 to 1991 he was also a member of the Parliamentary Assembly of the Council of Europe, as well as its vice president, and from 1987 to 1991 he was chairman of the Assembly's board for relations to European non-member states.

As an expert in Eastern European matters, Sager actively participated in decision-making during the discussions in the Council of Europe on the developments in Eastern Europe of the 1980s. His political interestes, however, went beyond Switzerland and Eastern Europe. E.g. he also commented on the Falklands War and South American issues. In 1967, also published an analysis of the Soviet influence in India and Pakistan. Moscow's Hand in India was described by Minoo Masani as having left a mark on India, and a review from Pakistan found that it "represents a painstaking and scholarly effort to examine ... Muslim thought and politics since the time of Sir Syed Ahmed Khan."

In the late 1980s, Sager began to oppose SVP politician Christoph Blocher whom he called "a horrible catastrophe" in a 2005 interview. "He is like a centrifuge. Anything that isn't similar to him or that he doesn't like, he will haul away." In contrast to Blocher, Sager was an advocate of Switzerland joining the United Nations in 1986 and the European Economic Area (EEA) in 1992. The 1992 decision to not join the EEA was called "the probably most incorrect decision regarding external affairs in the 20th century" by Sager. In 1991, Sager left the Swiss People's party in protest and joined the Liberal Party of Switzerland in 2003.

== Criticism and controversies ==
Peter Sager is regarded as one of the most controversial figures of Swiss post-World-War-II history. He was often severely criticised for his views whereupon he used to retaliate with harsh words and even lawsuits.

One critical point was Sager's attitude towards the Sandinist government of Nicaragua. Several Swiss papers accused Sager of supporting the counter-rebels with his public lectures and working for the CIA since the counter-rebels were allegedly financed by the CIA. Sager replied with an essay "Fallstudie einer Diffamierung – Nachrichtenmanipulation durch Nicaragua-Propagandisten in der Schweiz" [Case Study of a Defamation – Manipulation of the News by Nicaragua Propagandists in Switzerland] and with filing lawsuits for libel.

According to Peter Hug, records of the South African military intelligence agency show that the agency attributed great importance to the contact with Peter Sager and others for establishing a positive foreign view of South Africa.

== Awards ==
Peter Sager received the Ida Somazzi Prize in 1974.
