= Ruth Metzler =

Swiss politician

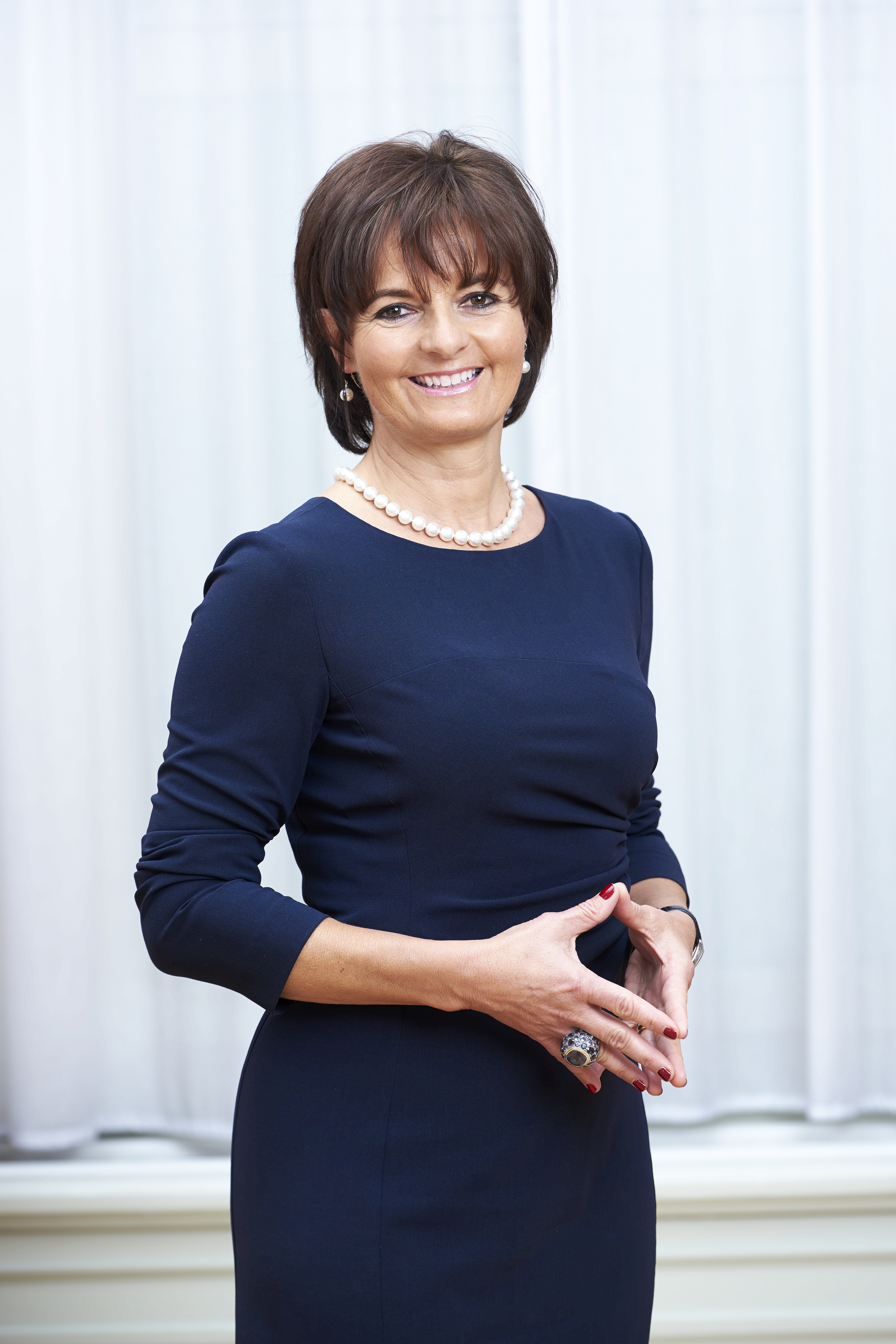
- Metzler in 2016

Vice President of Switzerland
- In office 1 January 2003 – 31 December 2003
- President: Pascal Couchepin
- Preceded by: Pascal Couchepin
- Succeeded by: Samuel Schmid

Head of the Department of Justice and Police
- In office 1 May 1999 – 31 December 2003
- Preceded by: Arnold Koller
- Succeeded by: Christoph Blocher

Member of the Swiss Federal Council
- In office 1 May 1999 – 31 December 2003
- Preceded by: Arnold Koller
- Succeeded by: Christoph Blocher

Personal details
- Born: 23 May 1964 (age 62) Sursee, Switzerland
- Party: Christian Democratic People's Party
- Spouses: Lukas Metzler (m. 1991; div. 2010) Stephan Zimmermann (m. 2015)
- Education: University of Fribourg

Ruth Metzler (née Arnold, 23 May 1964) is a Swiss politician who served as a Member of the Swiss Federal Council from 1999 to 2003. A member of the Christian Democratic People's Party (CVP/PDC), she headed the Federal Department of Justice and Police.

== Biography ==
=== Political career ===
Educated at the University of Fribourg, Metzler served as the cantonal executive in charge of finance in Appenzell Innerrhoden from 1996 to 1999.

She was elected to the Swiss Federal Council on 11 March 1999, as a member of the Christian Democratic People's Party. Metzler took office at the Federal Department of Justice and Police the following 1 May, succeeding Arnold Koller. On 1 January 2003, she assumed the vice presidency of the Swiss Confederation.

On 10 December 2003, she became the third Federal Councillor not to be reelected in the history of the Swiss Federal State. In the 2003 Federal Assembly election, her party lost many voters and the Swiss People's Party (SVP/UDC) became the largest party of Switzerland. The Swiss People's Party then requested another seat in the Federal Council. In the elections for the Federal Council on 10 December, the Federal Assembly did not reelect Metzler, and elected Christoph Blocher instead, by 121 votes to 116 on the third round of voting. She challenged her CVP colleague Joseph Deiss for his seat, but lost by 138 to 96. Metzler kept her seat until the end of the year and Christoph Blocher succeeded her on 1 January 2004.

=== After politics ===
She published the memories of those years under the title "Grissini & Alpenbitter", 2004, ISBN 3-85882-388-0. She taught between February and July 2004 at the University of St. Gallen a class called "Gestaltungsmöglichkeiten in der Politik" which can be translated as "scope for design in politics". Since April 2005 she has been working for the Swiss pharmaceutical company Novartis.In 2006 she headed Investor Relations at the Novartis headquarter in Basel and left the company in 2010.

Since 2010 she owned the consulting firm Metzler Strategie, Führung, Kommunikation AG in Appenzell.

In May 2011 she became chairwoman of the board of the export promotion agency Switzerland Global Enterprise. She has also served on the boards of AXA Switzerland, where she sat for fourteen years, six of them as vice-chairwoman, until stepping down in April 2026 to concentrate on her role at Swiss Olympic, where she was elected president in 2024.

Political offices
Preceded by Arnold Koller	Member of the Swiss Federal Council; 1999–2003	Succeeded by Christoph Blocher
Preceded by Arnold Koller	Head of the Department of Justice and Police; 1999–2003	Succeeded by Christoph Blocher
Preceded by Pascal Couchepin	Vice President of Switzerland; 2003	Succeeded by Samuel Schmid
