= 2003 Swiss Federal Council election =

Elections to the Swiss Federal Council were held on 10 December 2003 to elect all seven of Switzerland's Federal Council. The 246 members of the United Federal Assembly elect the seven members individually by an absolute majority of votes, with the members serving for four years, beginning on 1 January 2004, or until resigning.

Six of the seven incumbents were running for re-election. Five were re-elected, but Ruth Metzler lost in her re-election bid: the first time an incumbent Federal Councillor had failed to be re-elected since 1872. In her place was elected Christoph Blocher of the Swiss People's Party (SVP). This modified the magic formula, by which the four largest parties have shared power on the Federal Council by a set formula since 1959; Metzler's Christian Democratic People's Party (CVP) was reduced from two seats to one, and Blocher's SVP increased from one to two.

== Results ==
=== Seat held by Moritz Leuenberger ===
Candidate	Party	Canton	Round 1
Moritz Leuenberger	SP	Zürich	211
Others			23
Ballot papers distributed			246
Ballot papers returned			246
Invalid votes (of which spoiled)			12 (1)
Valid votes			234

=== Seat held by Pascal Couchepin ===
Candidate	Party	Canton	Round 1
Pascal Couchepin	FDP	Valais	178
Fulvio Pelli	FDP	Ticino	17
Fernand Cuche	Greens	Neuchâtel	10
Others			25
Ballot papers distributed			246
Ballot papers returned			246
Invalid votes (of which spoiled)			16 (3)
Valid votes			230

=== Seat held by Ruth Metzler ===
Candidate	Party	Canton	Round 1	Round 2	Round 3
Christoph Blocher	SVP	Zürich	116	119	121
Ruth Metzler	CVP	Appenzell Innerrhoden	116	117	116
Others			8	5	0
Ballot papers distributed			246	246	246
Ballot papers returned			246	246	246
Invalid votes (of which spoiled)			6 (2)	5 (3)	9 (4)
Valid votes			240	241	237

=== Seat held by Joseph Deiss ===
Candidate	Party	Canton	Round 1
Joseph Deiss	CVP	Fribourg	138
Ruth Metzler	CVP	Appenzell Innerrhoden	96
Others			7
Ballot papers distributed			245
Ballot papers returned			245
Invalid votes (of which spoiled)			4 (0)
Valid votes			241

=== Seat held by Samuel Schmid ===
Candidate	Party	Canton	Round 1
Samuel Schmid	SVP	Bern	167
Ruth Genner	Greens	Zürich	13
Others			24
Ballot papers distributed			244
Ballot papers returned			244
Invalid votes (of which spoiled)			40 (1)
Valid votes			204

=== Seat held by Micheline Calmy-Rey ===
Candidate	Party	Canton	Round 1
Micheline Calmy-Rey	SP	Geneva	206
Others			20
Ballot papers distributed			244
Ballot papers returned			244
Invalid votes (of which spoiled)			18 (1)
Valid votes			226

=== Vacant seat ===
Candidate	Party	Canton	Round 1	Round 2
Hans-Rudolf Merz	FDP	Aargau	115	127
Christine Beerli	FDP	Bern	83	96
Franz Steinegger	FDP	Uri	16	N/A
Fulvio Pelli	FDP	Ticino	11	N/A
Others			16	16
Ballot papers distributed			246	244
Ballot papers returned			246	244
Invalid votes (of which spoiled)			5 (0)	5 (0)
Valid votes			241	239
