= Werner L. Oswald =

- Oswald, c. 1965
- Born: Werner L. Oswald; 16 March 1904; Lucerne, Switzerland
- Died: 23 February 1979 (aged 74); Zürich, Switzerland
- Occupations: Industrialist; Businessman
- Known for: Founding and leading EMS-Chemie
- Spouse: Éleonore Matthys (m. 1944; died 1979)
- Children: 5

Werner L. Oswald (16 March 1904 - 23 February 1979) was a Swiss industrialist and businessman who was most prominently known for founding the EMS-Chemie conglomerate in 1936 which was taken over by the Blocher family after his death.

== Early life and education ==
Oswald was born 16 March 1904 in Lucerne, Switzerland, one of five children, to Arthur Oswald (1872–1938), an attorney and executive council of the Canton of Lucerne, and Maria Oswald (née Waller; 1876–1960). His younger brother was Victor Oswald (born 1909), who served as the president of the board of EMS-Chemie in 1980.

He completed the schools in Gais and Trogen, before attending the Agricultural School of Langenthal. Subsequently, he completed studies at the Federal Institute of Technology where he completed a doctorate.

== Career ==
In 1936, Oswald formed Holzverzuckerungs AG (abbreviated as HOWAG) in Zurich, which manufactured fuel as a fermentation product from waste wood. In 1942, he expended the operations and opened new manufacturing facilities in Domat/Ems, in order of the national supply service during World War II. In 1956, he denied further subventions from the government and switched the production to synthetic fibers. In 1960, the company was ultimately renamed to Emser-Werke AG (since 1978 as EMS-Chemie).

== Personal life ==
In 1944, Oswald married Éleonore "Lonny" Matthys, with whom he had five children;

- Werner Oswald, married to Ulla Stucki, two sons.
- Anna-Marie Oswald, married to Dr. Nicolas Hardt, no issue.
- Marianne Oswald, married to Hans Zollinger, five children.
- Christoph R. Oswald.
- Hermann A. Oswald.

Oswald resided in Hurden on Lake Zurich. He passed away 23 February 1979 aged 74.
