= Männedorf =

- Municipality
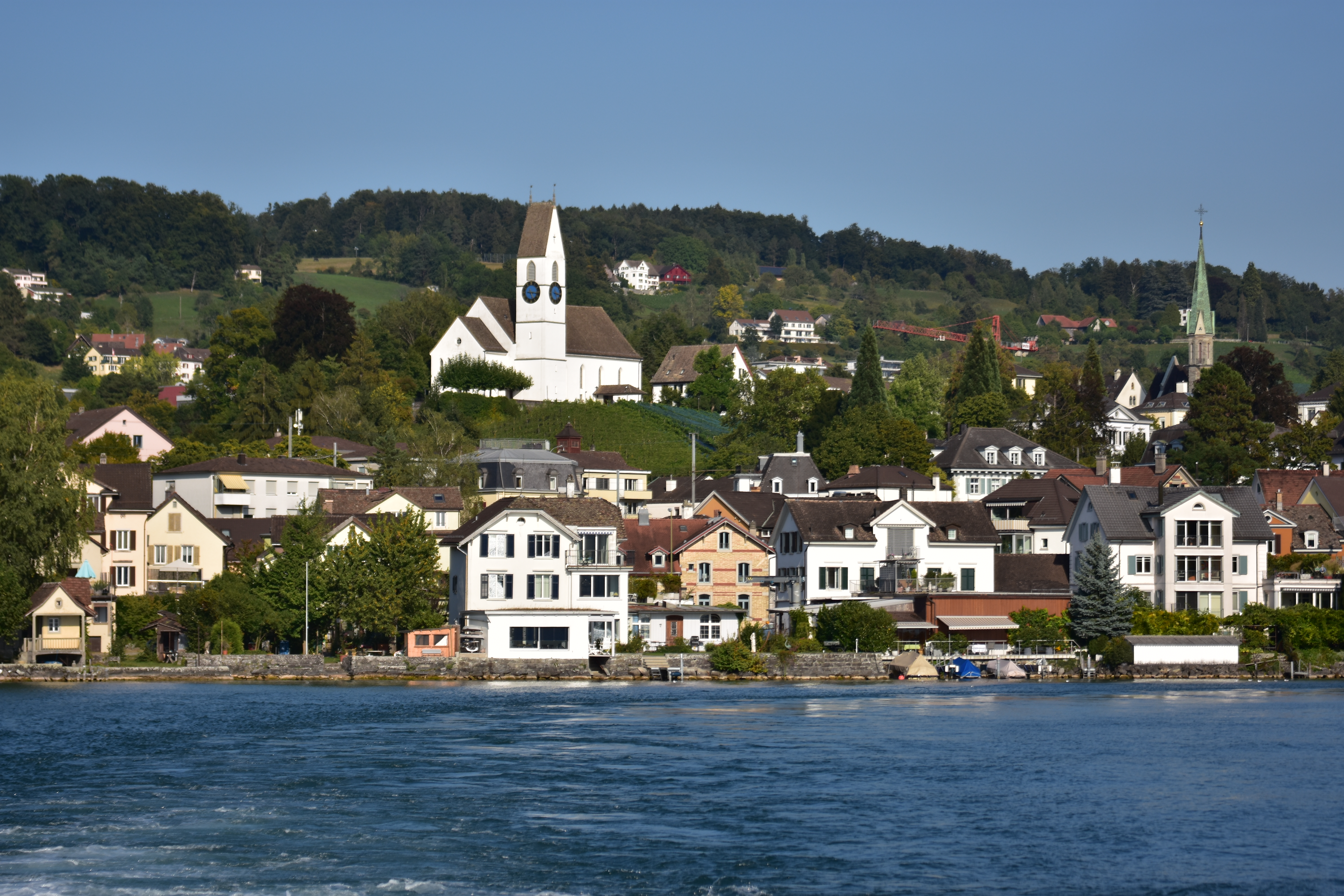

- Flag Coat of arms
- Location of Männedorf
- Location within Switzerland Location within Canton of Zurich
- Coordinates: 47°15′N 8°41′E
- Country: Switzerland
- Canton: Zurich
- District: Meilen

Area
  - Total: 4.78 km^{2} (1.85 sq mi)
- Elevation: 419 m (1,375 ft)

Population (December 2020)
  - Total: 11,397
  - Density: 2,380/km^{2} (6,180/sq mi)
- Time zone: UTC+01:00 (CET)
  - Summer (DST): UTC+02:00 (CEST)
- Postal code: 8708
- SFOS number: 155
- ISO 3166 code: CH-ZH
- Surrounded by: Oetwil am See, Richterswil, Stäfa, Uetikon am See, Wädenswil
- Website: www.maennedorf.ch

Männedorf (High Alemannic: Mänidoorf) is a municipality in the district of Meilen in the canton of Zürich in Switzerland.

== History ==
Aerial view by Walter Mittelholzer (1919)

Like in all other villages along the lake of Zürich, archeological findings indicate settlements in the stone ages. The original settlement dates from the 7th or 8th century; the name Mannidorf ("Village of Manno", a personal name, possibly of a nobleman) is mentioned in 933. The upright otter on a golden background in the coats of arm is derived from that of the medieval provost Eberhard Ottikon.

The village originally housed fishermen, farmers and winegrowers. Männedorf was once owned by the monastery of Pfäfers. It later developed to become the home of the bailiwick of Zürich from 1405 until 1798. After the opening of the Lake Zurich right bank railway from Zürich to Rapperswil in 1894 the village blossomed. Many businesses of handicraft, trade and industry were established. Most notably probably a tannery, organ-building and precision mechanics. There was also a mill, a smithy, a public bath and a growing number of guesthouses.

By today Männedorf has become part of the Zürich agglomeration like all the villages in the region.

== Geography ==
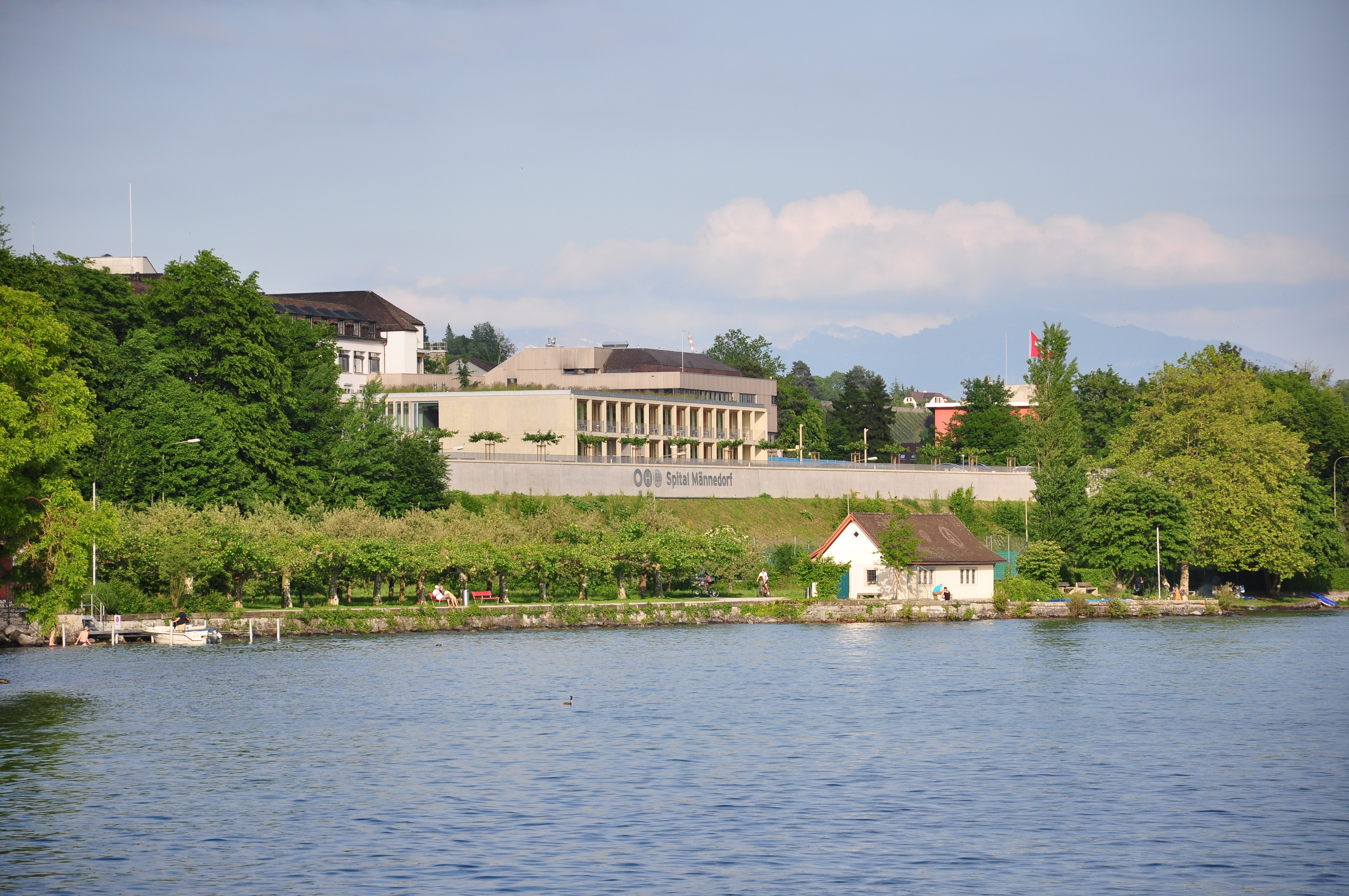
Regional hospital

Männedorf has an area of 4.8 square kilometers (1.9 sq mi). Of this area, 34.1% is used for agricultural purposes, while 24.8% is forested. Of the rest of the land, 40.6% is settled (buildings or roads) and the remainder (0.4%) is non-productive (rivers, glaciers or mountains). In 1996 housing and buildings made up 28.5% of the total area, while transportation infrastructure made up the rest (12.3%). Of the total unproductive area, water (streams and lakes) made up 0% of the area. As of 2007 47% of the total municipal area was undergoing some type of construction.

It is located on the north bank of the Lake Zürich in the Pfannenstiel region. In the local dialect it is called Männidorf.

== Demographics ==
Männedorf has a population (as of 31 December 2020) of 11,397. As of 2007, 17.0% of the population was made up of foreign nationals. As of 2008 the gender distribution of the population was 48.3% male and 51.7% female. Over the last 10 years the population has grown at a rate of 26.7%. Most of the population (as of 2000) speaks German (88.0%), with Italian being second most common (2.6%) and English being third (1.5%).

In the 2007 election the most popular party was the SVP which received 29.6% of the vote. The next three most popular parties were the SPS (17.5%), the FDP (15.1%) and the CVP (13%).

The age distribution of the population (as of 2000) is children and teenagers (0–19 years old) make up 19.9% of the population, while adults (20–64 years old) make up 62.4% and seniors (over 64 years old) make up 17.8%. About 82.5% of the population (between age 25-64) have completed either non-mandatory upper secondary education or additional higher education (either university or a Fachhochschule). There are 3806 households in Männedorf.

Männedorf has an unemployment rate of 1.94%. As of 2005, there were 94 people employed in the primary economic sector and about 20 businesses involved in this sector. 1119 people are employed in the secondary sector and there are 63 businesses in this sector. 2404 people are employed in the tertiary sector, with 308 businesses in this sector. As of 2007 27.7% of the working population were employed full-time, and 72.3% were employed part-time.

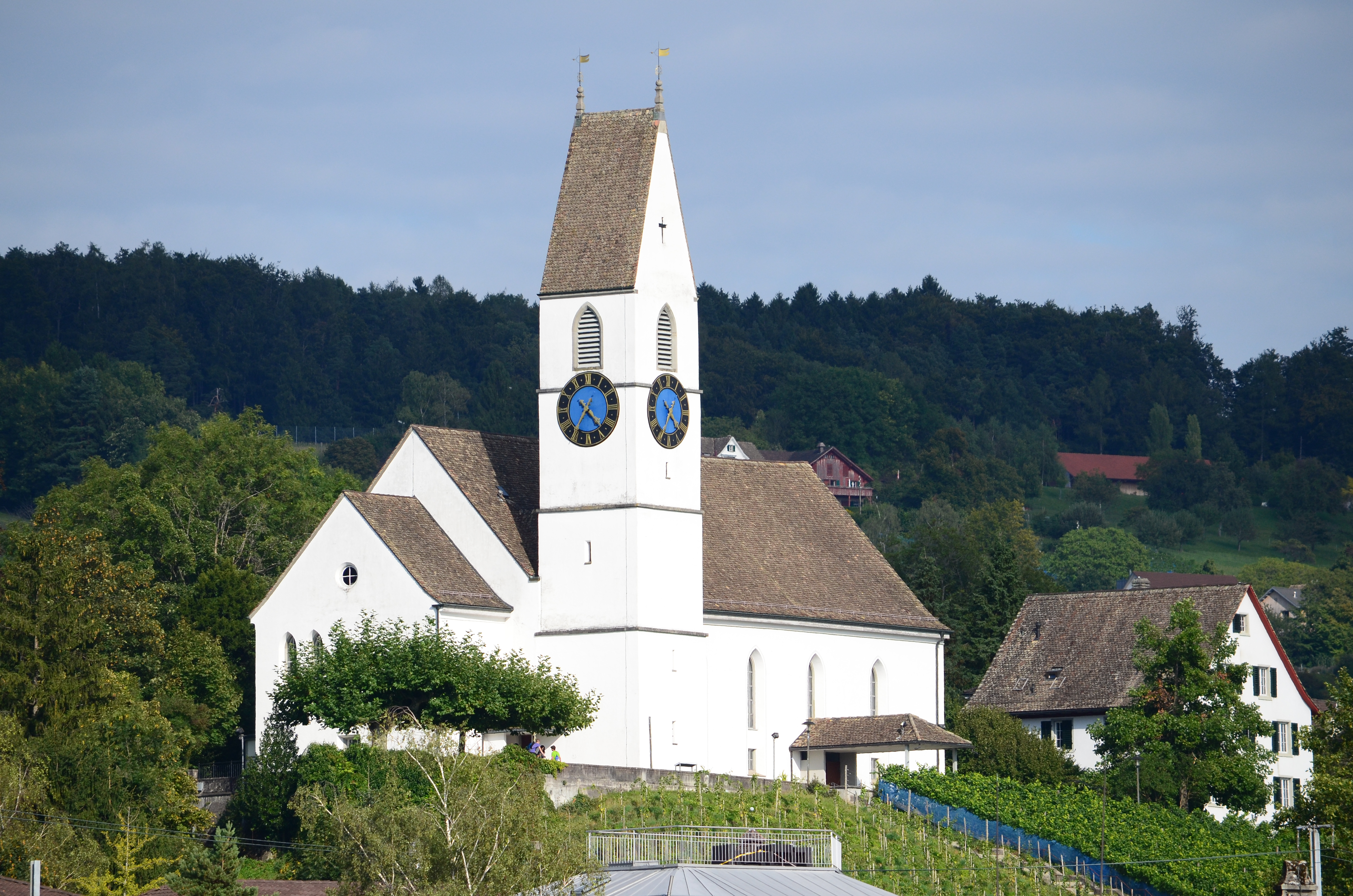
Reformed church in Männedorf

As of 2008 there were 2606 Catholics and 4284 Protestants in Männedorf. In the 2000 census, religion was broken down into several smaller categories. From the census, 50.2% were some type of Protestant, with 46.6% belonging to the Swiss Reformed Church and 3.6% belonging to other Protestant churches. 25.6% of the population were Catholic. Of the rest of the population, 0% were Muslim, 4.9% belonged to another religion (not listed), 3.5% did not give a religion, and 14.9% were atheist or agnostic.

The historical population is given in the following table:

year	population
1799	2,166
1850	2,382
1900	2,902
1950	4,396
2000	8,348

== Transportation ==
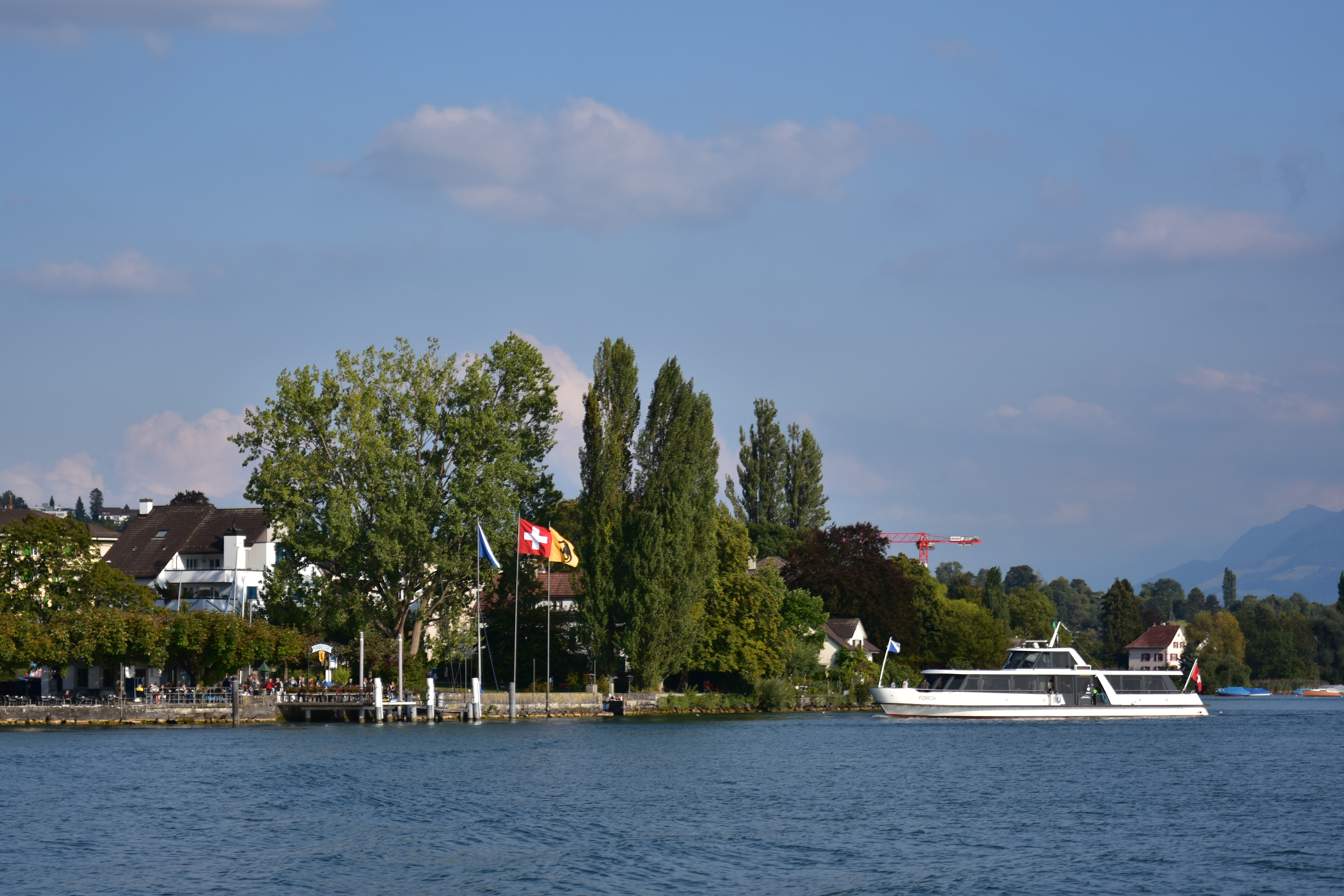
The ZSG landing stage at Männedorf

Männedorf railway station is served by line S7 of the S-Bahn Zürich, which provides two trains per hour to both Zürich Hauptbahnhof and Rapperswil. The journey time to Zürich is about 25 minutes, and somewhat less to Rapperswil.

In summer, Männedorf is served by regular ship services between Zurich and Rapperswil, run by the Zürichsee-Schifffahrtsgesellschaft (ZSG) and calling at various lake side towns. A passenger ferry, operated on an hourly basis throughout the year by the same company, links Männedorf with Wädenswil on the opposite shore of the lake. The railway station and landing stage are some 5 minutes walk apart.

Local bus services are operated by the Verkehrsbetriebe Zürichsee und Oberland (VZO) bus company.

== Notable people ==
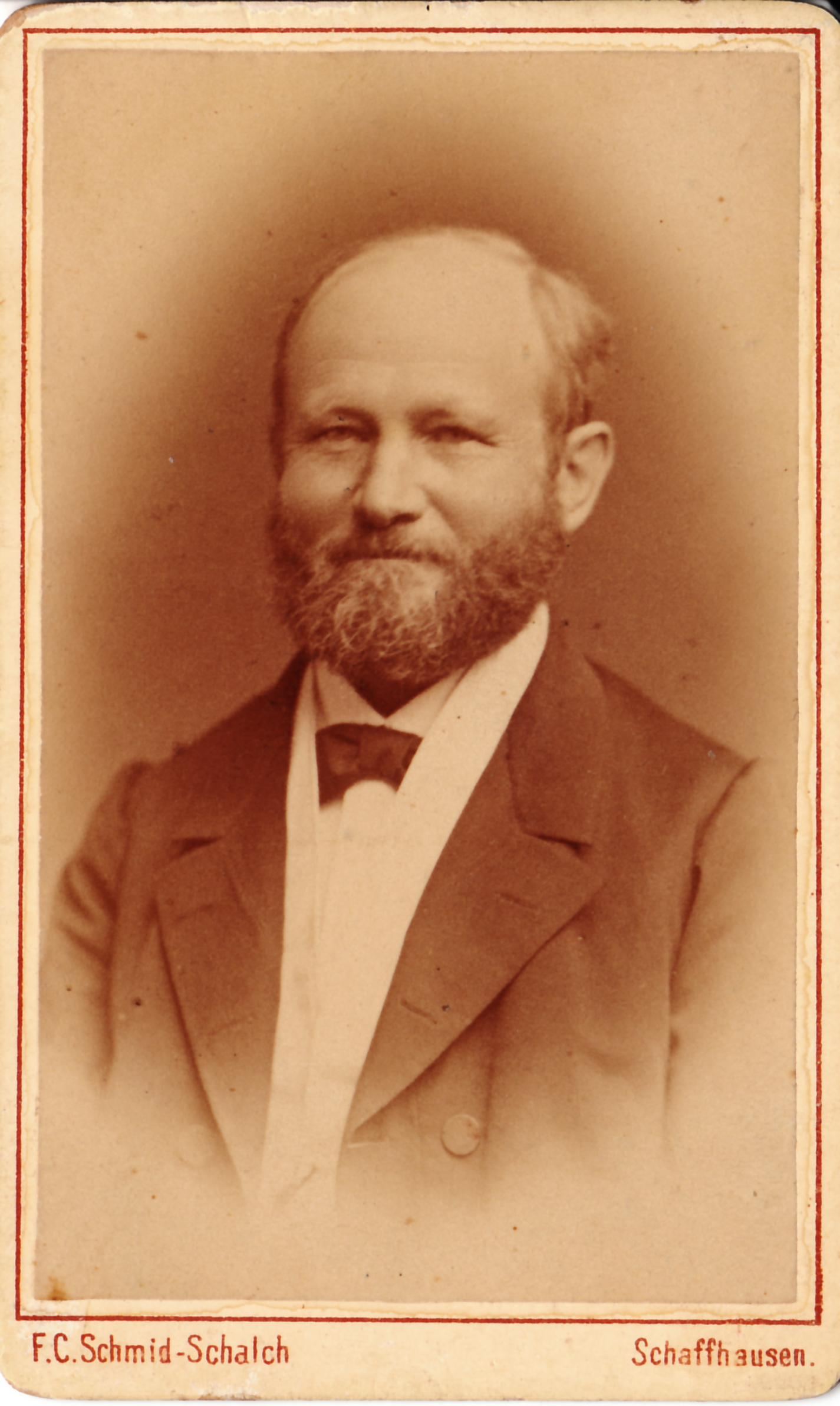
Friedrich Staub, ca. 1870

- Albert Billeter (1815 in Männedorf – 1894 in Paris), a Swiss clockmaker
- Friedrich Staub (1826 in Männedorf – 1896) a Swiss lexicographer, dialectologist and librarian
- Kurt Pahlen (1907–2003) an Austrian conductor and musicologist, settled in Männedorf in the early 1970s
- Adolf Muschg (born 1934 in Männedorf) a Swiss writer, professor of literature, member of Gruppe Olten
- Ulrich Luz (born 1938 in Männedorf) a Swiss theologian and professor emeritus at the University of Bern
- Barbara Schmid-Federer (born 1965 births), Swiss politician and president of the Swiss Red Cross
- Magdalena Martullo-Blocher (born 1969 in Männedorf) a Swiss billionaire, businesswoman, politician and CEO of Ems-Chemie
- Marc Sway (born 1979 in Männedorf) a Swiss soul and pop singer
- Teo Gheorghiu (born 1992 in Männedorf) a Swiss-Canadian pianist and actor

Sport

- Jo Zeller (born 1955 in Männedorf) a Swiss racing driver
- Yvonne Schnorf-Wabe (born 1965 in Männedorf) a Swiss road cyclist
- Diana Romagnoli (born 1977 in Männedorf) a Swiss fencer. silver medallist in the women's team épée event at the 2000 Summer Olympics
- Maurice Brunner (born 1991 in Männedorf) a Swiss footballer who plays for FC Vaduz
- Stefanie Wetli (born 2000) a Swiss ice hockey player, competed in the 2018 Winter Olympics
- Tim Berni (born 2000) a Columbus Blue Jackets prospect
