= 2003 Swiss federal election =

← 1999	19 October 2003	2007 →
- Turnout: 45.23% ▲1.93pp
- National Council
- All 200 seats in the National Council; 101 seats needed for a majority
Party	Leader	Vote %	Seats	+/–
Swiss People's	Ueli Maurer	26.68	55	+11
Social Democrats	Christiane Brunner	23.33	52	+1
Free Democrats	Christiane Langenberger	17.34	36	−7
Christian Democrats	Philipp Stähelin	14.35	28	−7
Greens	Ruth Genner	7.43	13	+5
Evangelical People's	Ruedi Aeschbacher	2.28	3	0
Liberals	Claude Ruey	2.18	4	−2
Federal Democrats	Hans Moser	1.26	2	+1
Swiss Democrats	Rudolf Keller	0.96	1	0
Labour		0.69	2	0
Feminist & Greens		0.53	1	0
solidaritéS		0.50	1	0
Christian Social		0.36	1	0
Ticino League	Giuliano Bignasca	0.35	1	−1
This lists parties that won seats. See the complete results below.
- Council of States
- All 46 seats in the Council of States; 24 seats needed for a majority
Party	Seats	+/–
Christian Democrats	15	0
Free Democrats	14	−3
Social Democrats	9	+3
Swiss People's	8	+1
This lists parties that won seats. See the complete results below.
Results by canton

Federal elections were held in Switzerland on 19 October 2003. Although in Switzerland's political system, in which all four major parties form a coalition, it is very difficult to achieve a change of government, this election produced an upset with the strong showing of the right-wing, anti-European Union and anti-immigration Swiss People's Party. The left-wing parties, the Social Democrats and the Greens, also improved their positions. The losers were the parties of the centre and centre-right, the Christian Democratic People's Party and the Free Democratic Party.

In the aftermath of the elections Ruth Metzler-Arnold, one of the two Christian Democrats in the Federal Council was replaced by Christoph Blocher, the most influential politician in the Swiss People's Party.

== Electoral system ==
Switzerland has a bicameral legislature, the Federal Assembly (Assemblée Fédérale / Bundesversammlung / Asamblea Federale / Assemblea Federala).

- The National Council (Conseil National / Nationalrat / Consiglio Nazionale / Cussegl Naziunal) has 200 members, elected for four-year terms by proportional representation in multi-member constituencies corresponding to the 26 Swiss cantons and half-cantons.
- The Council of States (Conseil des Etats / Ständerat / Consiglio degli Stati / Cussegl dals Stadis) has 46 members elected for four-year terms from multi-member and single-member constituencies.

These elections were to the National Council and for most of the members of the Council of States.

All parties in Switzerland have different names in French, German and Italian, and conduct separate campaigns in the different language areas.

== Results ==
=== National Council ===
Party	Votes	%	Seats	+/–
Swiss People's Party	560,750	26.68	55	+11
Social Democratic Party	490,385	23.33	52	+1
Free Democratic Party	364,493	17.34	36	–7
Christian Democratic People's Party	301,652	14.35	28	–7
Green Party	156,226	7.43	13	+5
Evangelical People's Party	47,838	2.28	3	0
Liberal Party	45,864	2.18	4	–2
Federal Democratic Union	26,590	1.26	2	+1
Swiss Democrats	20,177	0.96	1	0
Swiss Party of Labour	14,595	0.69	2	0
Feminist and Green Alternative Groups	11,153	0.53	1	0
Solidarity	10,562	0.50	1	0
Christian Social Party	7,539	0.36	1	0
Ticino League	7,304	0.35	1	–1
Freedom Party	4,000	0.19	0	0
Other parties	32,913	1.57	0	–
Total	2,102,041	100.00	200	0
Valid votes	2,102,041	97.23		
Invalid/blank votes	59,880	2.77		
Total votes	2,161,921	100.00		
Registered voters/turnout	4,779,733	45.23		
Source: Nohlen & Stöver

==== By constituency ====
Constituency	Seats	Electorate	Turnout	Party	Votes	Seats won
Aargau	15	363,920	153,832	Swiss People's Party	778,770	6
Aargau	15	363,920	153,832	Social Democratic Party	474,727	3
Aargau	15	363,920	153,832	Christian Democratic People's Party	348,639	2
Aargau	15	363,920	153,832	Free Democratic Party	342,629	2
Aargau	15	363,920	153,832	Green Party	133,202	1
Aargau	15	363,920	153,832	Evangelical People's Party	116,864	1
Aargau	15	363,920	153,832	Swiss Democrats	32,175	0
Aargau	15	363,920	153,832	Freedom Party	5,070	0
Aargau	15	363,920	153,832	Swiss Nationalist Party	2,867	0
Appenzell Ausserrhoden	1	36,047	17,789	Free Democratic Party	7,161	1
Appenzell Ausserrhoden	1	36,047	17,789	Swiss People's Party	6,680	0
Appenzell Ausserrhoden	1	36,047	17,789	Social Democratic Party	3,468	0
Appenzell Ausserrhoden	1	36,047	17,789	Others	131	0
Appenzell Innerrhoden	1	10,228	3,595	Christian Democratic People's Party	2,310	1
Appenzell Innerrhoden	1	10,228	3,595	Swiss People's Party	725	0
Appenzell Innerrhoden	1	10,228	3,595	Others	300	0
Basel-Landschaft	7	179,186	79,248	Swiss People's Party	144,624	2
Basel-Landschaft	7	179,186	79,248	Social Democratic Party	134,620	2
Basel-Landschaft	7	179,186	79,248	Free Democratic Party	108,566	1
Basel-Landschaft	7	179,186	79,248	Green Party	68,652	1
Basel-Landschaft	7	179,186	79,248	Christian Democratic People's Party	54,769	1
Basel-Landschaft	7	179,186	79,248	Swiss Democrats	14,707	0
Basel-Landschaft	7	179,186	79,248	Evangelical People's Party	14,554	0
Basel-Landschaft	7	179,186	79,248	Non-Partisan 4Wb	4,332	0
Basel-Landschaft	7	179,186	79,248	Freedom Party	1,107	0
Basel-Stadt	5	116,361	57,735	Social Democratic Party	115,492	3
Basel-Stadt	5	116,361	57,735	Swiss People's Party	52,574	1
Basel-Stadt	5	116,361	57,735	Free Democratic Party	27,975	1
Basel-Stadt	5	116,361	57,735	Liberal Party	23,873	0
Basel-Stadt	5	116,361	57,735	Christian Democratic People's Party	18,612	0
Basel-Stadt	5	116,361	57,735	Green Party	16,122	0
Basel-Stadt	5	116,361	57,735	Strong Alternative Basel	9,893	0
Basel-Stadt	5	116,361	57,735	Evangelical People's Party	8,080	0
Basel-Stadt	5	116,361	57,735	People's Action	4,425	0
Basel-Stadt	5	116,361	57,735	Swiss Democrats	3,122	0
Basel-Stadt	5	116,361	57,735	Federal Democratic Union	2,086	0
Bern	26	685,159	288,679	Swiss People's Party	2,180,961	8
Bern	26	685,159	288,679	Social Democratic Party	2,058,317	8
Bern	26	685,159	288,679	Free Democratic Party	1,089,897	4
Bern	26	685,159	288,679	Green Party	683,025	2
Bern	26	685,159	288,679	Evangelical People's Party	379,099	1
Bern	26	685,159	288,679	Federal Democratic Union	301,886	1
Bern	26	685,159	288,679	Swiss Democrats	196,458	1
Bern	26	685,159	288,679	Christian Democratic People's Party	172,639	1
Bern	26	685,159	288,679	Romand List	143,558	0
Bern	26	685,159	288,679	Freedom Party	77,436	0
Bern	26	685,159	288,679	Independent Health Party	64,081	0
Bern	26	685,159	288,679	Action Jörg Stettler	16,254	0
Fribourg	7	164,210	74,547	Christian Democratic People's Party	128,063	2
Fribourg	7	164,210	74,547	Social Democratic Party	108,437	2
Fribourg	7	164,210	74,547	Swiss People's Party	107,958	1
Fribourg	7	164,210	74,547	Free Democratic Party	64,369	1
Fribourg	7	164,210	74,547	Christian Social Party	52,766	1
Fribourg	7	164,210	74,547	Green Party	20,305	0
Fribourg	7	164,210	74,547	Free List - Solidarity	11,158	0
Fribourg	7	164,210	74,547	Federal Democratic Union	3,625	0
Fribourg	7	164,210	74,547	Evangelical People's Party	3,614	0
Fribourg	7	164,210	74,547	Independent Movement	2,644	0
Fribourg	7	164,210	74,547	Direct Access	1,694	0
Geneva	11	219,984	101,081	Social Democratic Party	268,703	3
Geneva	11	219,984	101,081	Swiss People's Party	198,586	2
Geneva	11	219,984	101,081	Liberal Party	182,517	2
Geneva	11	219,984	101,081	Christian Democratic People's Party	128,317	1
Geneva	11	219,984	101,081	Green Party	121,762	1
Geneva	11	219,984	101,081	Free Democratic Party	79,030	1
Geneva	11	219,984	101,081	Solidarity	58,903	1
Geneva	11	219,984	101,081	Party of Labour	29,195	0
Geneva	11	219,984	101,081	Union of Swiss Patriots	10,735	0
Geneva	11	219,984	101,081	The Communists	7,506	0
Glarus	1	24,934	6,304	Social Democratic Party	3,811	1
Glarus	1	24,934	6,304	Christian Democratic People's Party	701	0
Glarus	1	24,934	6,304	Swiss People's Party	334	0
Glarus	1	24,934	6,304	Others	831	0
Grisons	5	129,782	50,766	Swiss People's Party	81,012	2
Grisons	5	129,782	50,766	Social Democratic Party	59,624	1
Grisons	5	129,782	50,766	Christian Democratic People's Party	56,295	1
Grisons	5	129,782	50,766	Free Democratic Party	37,849	1
Grisons	5	129,782	50,766	Federal Democratic Union	4,484	0
Jura	2	48,356	22,552	Christian Democratic People's Party	17,517	1
Jura	2	48,356	22,552	Social Democratic Party	15,186	1
Jura	2	48,356	22,552	Free Democratic Party	7,243	0
Jura	2	48,356	22,552	Swiss People's Party	3,675	0
Jura	2	48,356	22,552	Federal Democratic Union	787	0
Lucerne	10	237,537	120,970	Christian Democratic People's Party	345,791	3
Lucerne	10	237,537	120,970	Swiss People's Party	280,566	3
Lucerne	10	237,537	120,970	Free Democratic Party	271,153	2
Lucerne	10	237,537	120,970	Social Democratic Party	130,694	1
Lucerne	10	237,537	120,970	Green Party	115,076	1
Lucerne	10	237,537	120,970	CHance21	18,352	0
Lucerne	10	237,537	120,970	Evangelical People's Party	9,505	0
Lucerne	10	237,537	120,970	Swiss Democrats	4,137	0
Neuchâtel	5	105,235	59,925	Social Democratic Party	74,551	2
Neuchâtel	5	105,235	59,925	Swiss People's Party	57,279	1
Neuchâtel	5	105,235	59,925	Free Democratic Party	37,800	1
Neuchâtel	5	105,235	59,925	Liberal Party	36,808	0
Neuchâtel	5	105,235	59,925	Green Party	35,247	1
Neuchâtel	5	105,235	59,925	Party of Labour	7,655	0
Neuchâtel	5	105,235	59,925	Solidarity	5,630	0
Nidwalden	1	28,266	11,136	Free Democratic Party	7,888	1
Nidwalden	1	28,266	11,136	Swiss Democrats	912	0
Nidwalden	1	28,266	11,136	Others	111	0
Obwalden	1	22,900	10,471	Christian Democratic People's Party	6,402	1
Obwalden	1	22,900	10,471	Swiss People's Party	3,238	0
Obwalden	1	22,900	10,471	Others	2	0
Schaffhausen	2	48,022	30,349	Social Democratic Party	23,054	1
Schaffhausen	2	48,022	30,349	Free Democratic Party	16,923	1
Schaffhausen	2	48,022	30,349	Swiss People's Party	16,565	0
Schaffhausen	2	48,022	30,349	Christian Democratic People's Party	1,540	0
Schwyz	4	89,902	43,338	Swiss People's Party	72,419	2
Schwyz	4	89,902	43,338	Christian Democratic People's Party	38,894	1
Schwyz	4	89,902	43,338	Social Democratic Party	29,134	1
Schwyz	4	89,902	43,338	Free Democratic Party	25,471	0
Solothurn	7	166,052	78,689	Social Democratic Party	136,667	2
Solothurn	7	166,052	78,689	Free Democratic Party	129,086	2
Solothurn	7	166,052	78,689	Swiss People's Party	120,967	2
Solothurn	7	166,052	78,689	Christian Democratic People's Party	113,193	1
Solothurn	7	166,052	78,689	Green Party	32,283	0
Solothurn	7	166,052	78,689	Evangelical People's Party	6,445	0
St. Gallen	12	291,445	124,786	Swiss People's Party	486,421	4
St. Gallen	12	291,445	124,786	Christian Democratic People's Party	326,104	3
St. Gallen	12	291,445	124,786	Social Democratic Party	270,353	2
St. Gallen	12	291,445	124,786	Free Democratic Party	215,599	2
St. Gallen	12	291,445	124,786	Green Party	103,868	1
St. Gallen	12	291,445	124,786	Evangelical People's Party	22,118	0
St. Gallen	12	291,445	124,786	Federal Democratic Union	16,457	0
St. Gallen	12	291,445	124,786	Swiss Democrats	11,165	0
St. Gallen	12	291,445	124,786	Catholic People's Party	6,129	0
St. Gallen	12	291,445	124,786	Animal Welfare is Human Protection	6,054	0
St. Gallen	12	291,445	124,786	Brave and Innovative, One for All	4,957	0
St. Gallen	12	291,445	124,786	The East Swiss Party	1,405	0
Ticino	8	198,992	96,760	Free Democratic Party	218,619	2
Ticino	8	198,992	96,760	Social Democratic Party	189,427	2
Ticino	8	198,992	96,760	Christian Democratic People's Party	180,320	2
Ticino	8	198,992	96,760	Ticino League	58,428	1
Ticino	8	198,992	96,760	Swiss People's Party	55,652	0
Ticino	8	198,992	96,760	Green Party	21,765	0
Ticino	8	198,992	96,760	Risorgimento ticinese	9,552	0
Thurgau	6	146,431	62,771	Swiss People's Party	151,591	3
Thurgau	6	146,431	62,771	Christian Democratic People's Party	60,764	1
Thurgau	6	146,431	62,771	Social Democratic Party	52,080	1
Thurgau	6	146,431	62,771	Free Democratic Party	43,909	1
Thurgau	6	146,431	62,771	Green Party	29,282	0
Thurgau	6	146,431	62,771	Swiss Democrats	10,879	0
Thurgau	6	146,431	62,771	Evangelical People's Party	10,020	0
Thurgau	6	146,431	62,771	Federal Democratic Union	7,145	0
Thurgau	6	146,431	62,771	Catholic People's Party	2,557	0
Thurgau	6	146,431	62,771	Freedom Party	1,147	1
Uri	1	25,513	11,323	Free Democratic Party	3,964	1
Uri	1	25,513	11,323	Swiss People's Party	3,384	0
Uri	1	25,513	11,323	Green Party	3,312	0
Uri	1	25,513	11,323	Others	160	0
Vaud	18	373,917	172,119	Social Democratic Party	604,820	4
Vaud	18	373,917	172,119	Swiss People's Party	567,015	4
Vaud	18	373,917	172,119	Free Democratic Party	515,592	4
Vaud	18	373,917	172,119	Green Party	315,430	2
Vaud	18	373,917	172,119	Liberal Party	308,437	2
Vaud	18	373,917	172,119	Party of Labour	187,388	2
Vaud	18	373,917	172,119	Christian Democratic People's Party	128,878	0
Vaud	18	373,917	172,119	Solidarity	73,483	0
Vaud	18	373,917	172,119	Federal Democratic Union	49,225	0
Vaud	18	373,917	172,119	Evangelical People's Party	18,365	0
Vaud	18	373,917	172,119	Swiss Democrats	9,675	0
Vaud	18	373,917	172,119	Future + Security	7,268	0
Vaud	18	373,917	172,119	The Right to Know	6,843	0
Valais	7	190,121	101,344	Christian Democratic People's Party	259,846	3
Valais	7	190,121	101,344	Social Democratic Party	128,428	2
Valais	7	190,121	101,344	Free Democratic Party	114,910	1
Valais	7	190,121	101,344	Swiss People's Party	89,834	1
Valais	7	190,121	101,344	Christian Social Party	62,382	0
Valais	7	190,121	101,344	Green Party	17,443	0
Zug	3	67,318	35,418	Swiss People's Party	28,715	1
Zug	3	67,318	35,418	Christian Democratic People's Party	23,730	1
Zug	3	67,318	35,418	Free Democratic Party	23,178	0
Zug	3	67,318	35,418	Alternative Kanton Zug	14,095	1
Zug	3	67,318	35,418	Social Democratic Party	13,929	0
Zürich	34	810,622	365,859	Swiss People's Party	4,103,136	12
Zürich	34	810,622	365,859	Social Democratic Party	3,153,112	10
Zürich	34	810,622	365,859	Free Democratic Party	1,995,988	5
Zürich	34	810,622	365,859	Green Party	1,040,672	3
Zürich	34	810,622	365,859	Christian Democratic People's Party	667,236	2
Zürich	34	810,622	365,859	Evangelical People's Party	504,952	1
Zürich	34	810,622	365,859	Alternative List	266,063	0
Zürich	34	810,622	365,859	Federal Democratic Union	253,322	1
Zürich	34	810,622	365,859	Free Forum	112,781	0
Zürich	34	810,622	365,859	Swiss Democrats	106,877	0
Zürich	34	810,622	365,859	Hanf Ueli	23,731	0
Zürich	34	810,622	365,859	Youth in Parliament!	19,287	0
Zürich	34	810,622	365,859	Europe Party	12,184	0
Zürich	34	810,622	365,859	Freedom Party	11,364	0
Zürich	34	810,622	365,859	Humanist Party	9,730	0
Zürich	34	810,622	365,859	Die-Jugend.ch	4,206	0
Zürich	34	810,622	365,859	Danowski	3,631	0
Source: Bundesblatt, 18 November 2003

=== Council of the States ===
Party	Seats	+/–
Christian Democratic People's Party	15	0
Free Democratic Party	14	–3
Social Democratic Party	9	+3
Swiss People's Party	8	+1
Total	46	0
Source: Nohlen & Stöver

== See also ==
- 2003 Swiss Federal Council election

== Bibliography ==
- Church, Clive H. (May 2004). "The Swiss Elections of October 2003: Two Steps to System Change?". West European Politics. 27 (3): 518–534. doi:10.1080/0140238042000228121.
