= Maurice Brunner =

Swiss footballer (born 1991)

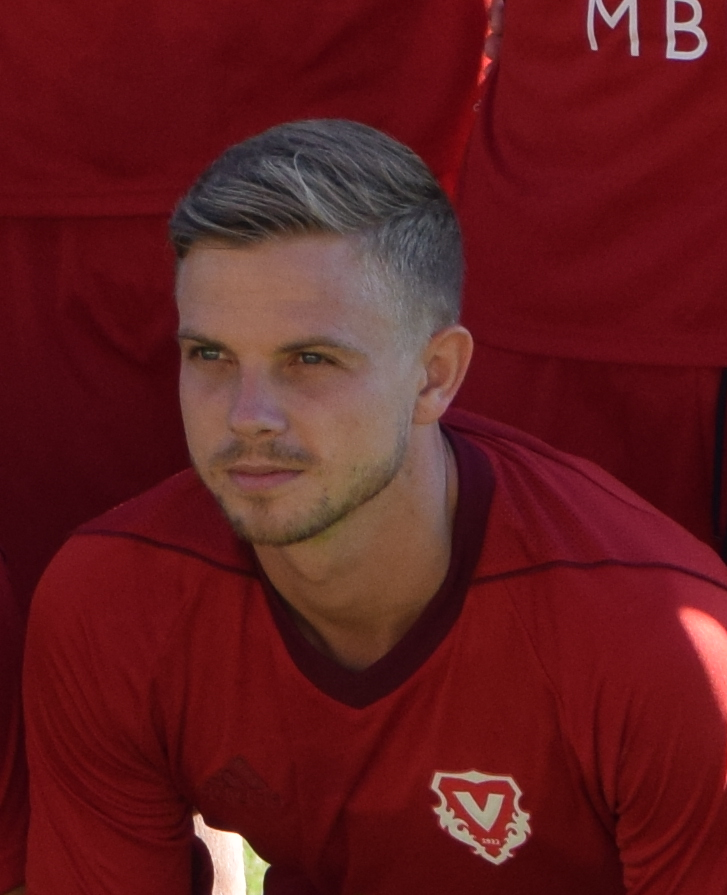

Personal information
- Full name: Maurice Brunner
- Date of birth: 29 January 1991 (age 35)
- Place of birth: Männedorf, Switzerland
- Height: 1.80 m (5 ft 11 in)
- Position: Midfielder

Team information
- Current team: Rapperswil-Jona
- Number: 24

Youth career
- 2001–2011: Zürich

Senior career*
Years	Team	Apps	(Gls)
2011–2015	Zürich	25	(0)
2012	→ Winterthur (loan)	6	(1)
2015–2016	Biel-Bienne	25	(3)
2016–2019	Vaduz	74	(6)
2019–	Rapperswil-Jona	13	(3)

International career
2011	Switzerland U20	1	(0)
- * Club domestic league appearances and goals

Maurice Brunner (born 29 January 1991) is a Swiss footballer who currently plays for FC Rapperswil-Jona.

== Career ==
His youth career went through Brunner at FC Stäfa and later moved to the youth department of FC Zurich. In August 2011, he made his professional debut in the return leg in the third qualifying round of the UEFA Champions League against Bayern Munich. He was substituted in the 65th minute with a score of 0:1 for Dušan Đurić. In the championship he came on Matchday 9 in the 1:3 defeat against FC Luzern for his debut. In the 80th minute he was brought in for Oliver Buff. The following season, he was loaned to the first round at FC Winterthur, where he came in just seven games but just 66th minutes of use and scored one goal. For the new season, he finally moved to FC Biel-Bienne, where he came to a total of 25 inserts in the Challenge League, scoring three goals. On 13 June 2016 FC Vaduz announced that it has committed Brunner for 3 years until the summer of 2019.

On 12 August 2019, Brunner joined FC Rapperswil-Jona on a two-year contract.

== National team ==
In October 2011 Brunner was mobilized for the U-20 friendly match against Germany. The game was lost with 1:4 and Brunner came on in the second half for Simon Grether came on.

== Honours ==
FC Zürich

- Swiss Cup (1): 2013–14

FC Vaduz

- Liechtenstein Football Cup (2): 2016-17, 2017-18
