= Christoph Blocher =

Swiss politician (born 1940)

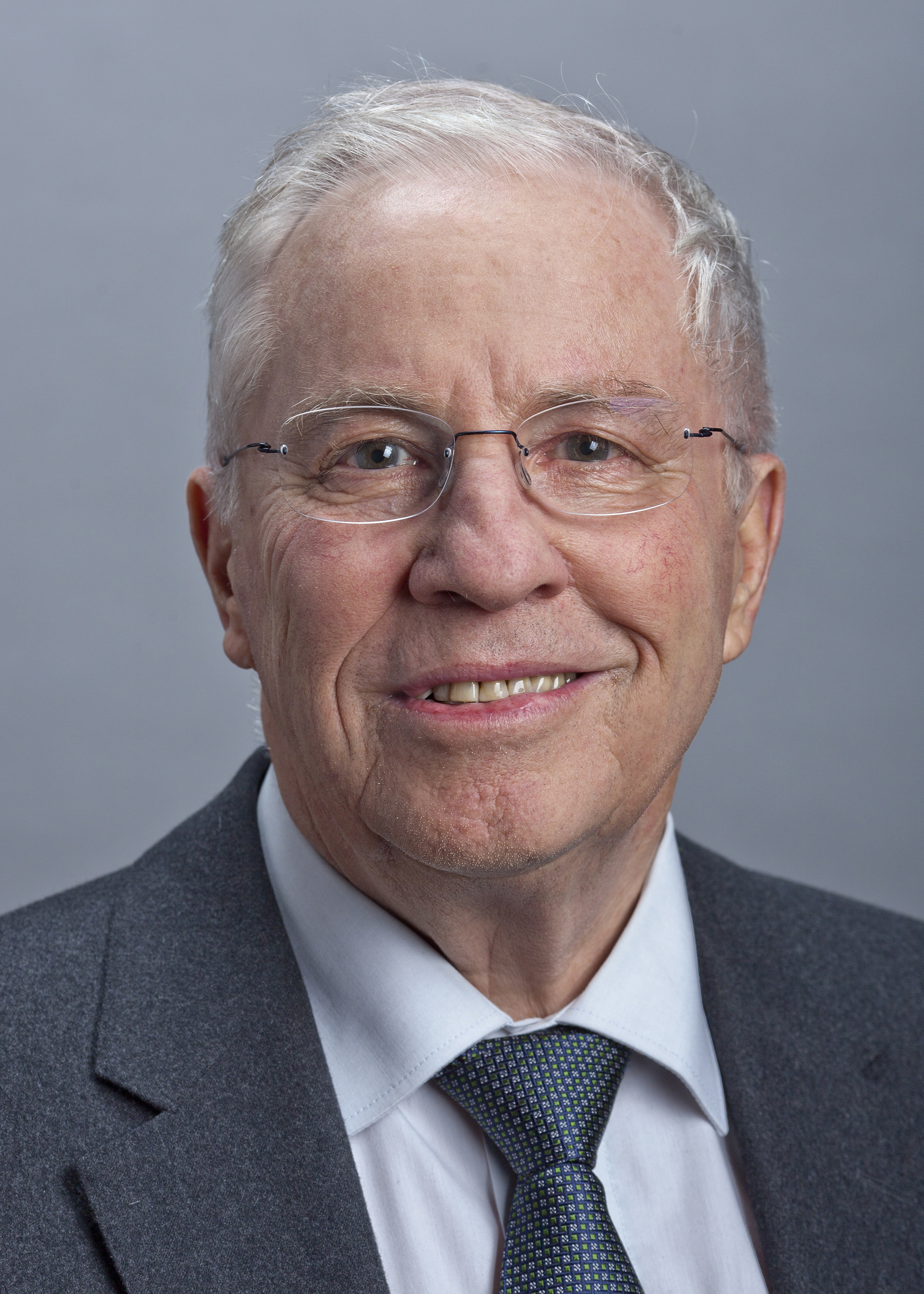
- Official portrait, 2011

Head of the Department of Justice and Police
- In office 1 January 2004 – 31 December 2007
- Preceded by: Ruth Metzler
- Succeeded by: Eveline Widmer-Schlumpf

Member of the Swiss Federal Council
- In office 1 January 2004 – 31 December 2007
- Preceded by: Ruth Metzler
- Succeeded by: Eveline Widmer-Schlumpf

Member of the Swiss National Council
- In office 5 December 2011 – 31 May 2014
- Constituency: Canton of Zürich
- In office 26 November 1979 – 10 December 2003
- Constituency: Canton of Zürich

Personal details
- Born: Christoph Wolfram Blocher; 11 October 1940 (age 85) Schaffhausen, Schaffhausen, Switzerland
- Party: Swiss People's Party
- Spouse: Silvia Kaiser (m. 1968)
- Children: 4, including Magdalena and Markus
- Relatives: Blocher family
- Education: University of Zurich (Licentiate); University of Zurich (JD)
- Occupation: Industrialist; art collector; politician
- Website: Official website Parliament website

Military service
- Allegiance: Switzerland
- Branch/service: Swiss Armed Forces
- Rank: Colonel

Christoph Wolfram Blocher (German pronunciation: [ˈkrɪstɔf ˈblɔxər]; born 11 October 1940) is a Swiss industrialist and politician who served as a Member of the Swiss Federal Council from 2004 to 2007. A member of the Swiss People's Party (SVP/UDC), he headed the Federal Department of Justice and Police. As an industrialist, he became wealthy as CEO and majority shareholder in the EMS-Chemie corporation, now run by his daughter, Magdalena Martullo-Blocher.

A controversial figure, Blocher is known for his role in transforming Swiss politics, shifting it to the right, as well as the Swiss People's Party, which has become "the dominant force in national politics". As he "developed a eurosceptic and anti-immigration agenda that has shaken up the cozy post-war consensual system prevailing in neutral Switzerland", Blocher served as the de facto leader of the SVP and a symbol of the party, holding its vice presidency from 2008 until 2018.

== Early life ==
Blocher was born 11 October 1940 in Schaffhausen, Switzerland, the seventh of eleven children, to Wolfram (1897–1972) and Ida (née Baur; 1908–1994). He primarily grew-up in Laufen-Uhwiesen and later in Kilchberg. His father was a pastor and his mother a homemaker. His second great-grandfather Johann Georg Blocher (1811–1899), a teacher, originally hailed from Beuggen near Rheinfelden in the Grand Duchy of Baden and immigrated to Switzerland around 1833, becoming a citizen in the village of Schattenhalb in the Bernese Alps, in 1861.

Blocher served in the Swiss military as an Aerial Defense Regiment Commander and Colonel. Blocher earned a certificate at the Wülflingen school of agriculture. In 1961, Blocher began studying independently for the Swiss Matura. In 1963, Blocher completed and passed the exams for the Swiss Matura, and in 1964, he passed an additional exam in Latin to pursue legal studies at university. He then studied law at the University of Zürich, in Montpellier, and in Paris. He has a DEA degree in law, and in 1971, he was awarded a doctorate in jurisprudence from the University of Zürich. While at the University of Zürich, Blocher co-founded the Students' Ring, which opposed the 1968 student protests and the left-wing politics on university campuses.

== Professional career ==
In 1969, Blocher started his professional career by entering the legal department of EMS-Chemie (previously known as Emser-Werke AG) as a trainee and later legal counsel. In 1972, he was ultimately elected to serve as chairman of the board and general director, which position he held in economically difficult times. The company owner, Werner L. Oswald, passed away in 1979. In 1983, Blocher acquired EMS, after he unsuccessfully was looking for a buyer for the heirs of the company, through a leveraged buyout for roughly 16 million Swiss Francs.

Blocher mainly financed the acquisition through loans backed by personal savings, securities and his family home in Feldmeilen, however most of it was debt capital. At the time of the acquisition, EMS had a market value of roughly 100–125 million Swiss Francs. When Blocher was voted into the Swiss Federal Council in 2003, he retired from all business functions in EMS and sold his majority holding to his four children on 30 December 2003. Blocher's oldest daughter, Magdalena Martullo-Blocher, became CEO of EMS on 1 January 2004. In 2014, Blocher bought shares of the newspaper Basler Zeitung and then bought the free newspaper Zehnder. In 2018, the magazine Bilanz estimated the Blocher family's fortune to be between 10 and 11 billion Swiss francs, placing it among the ten wealthiest families in Switzerland.

== Political career ==
Blocher built his political career by campaigning for smaller government, for a free-market economy, against Switzerland's membership in the European Union and for more tightly controlled immigration. He stated he entered the political arena by chance due to a local zoning dispute. Blocher joined the SVP in 1972 and became the SVP president of the SVP chapter in Meilen in 1974. After being elected to the Cantonal Council of Zürich in 1975, Blocher was elected to the Swiss National Council and represented the canton of Zürich there from 25 November 1979 until his election to the federal council on 12 December 2003 as a deputy of the Swiss People's Party (Schweizerische Volkspartei/Union démocratique du centre; SVP/UDC), and then again from 4 December 2011 to 30 May 2014.

In addition to leading the Zürich chapter of the Swiss People's Party, Blocher was a cofounder of the Action for an Independent and Neutral Switzerland (Aktion für eine unabhängige und neutrale Schweiz), and he served as the president of the organization from its foundation in 1986 until his election to the Federal Council in 2003. In 1982, Blocher founded Arbeitsgruppe Südliches Afrika, a pro-South Africa working group made up of Swiss members of parliament, such as Ulrich Schlüer. According to a Swiss government-funded research study authored by historian Peter Hug, records of the South African military intelligence agency show that the agency valued contact with Blocher, Peter Sager and other Swiss figures to create a positive view of Apartheid South Africa.

When Blocher was elected president of the Zürich SVP in 1977, he declared his intent to oversee significant change in the political line of the Zürich SVP, bringing an end to debates that aimed to open the party up to a wide array of opinions. Blocher soon consolidated his power in Zürich, and began to renew the organisational structures, activities, campaigning style and political agenda of the local branch. The young members of the party were boosted with the establishment of a cantonal Young SVP (JSVP) in 1977, as well as political training courses. The ideology of the Zürich branch was also reinforced, and the rhetoric hardened, which resulted in the best election result for the Zürich branch in fifty years in the 1979 federal election, with an increase from 11.3% to 14.5%. This was contrasted with the stable level in the other cantons, although the support also stagnated in Zürich through the 1980s.

The struggle that existed between the SVP's largest branches of Bern and Zürich continued into the early 1990s. While the Bern-oriented faction represented the old moderate style of the SVP, the Zürich-oriented wing led by Blocher represented a new radical right-wing populist agenda. The Zürich wing began to politicise asylum issues, and the question of European integration started to dominate Swiss political debates. They also adopted more confrontational methods. The Zürich-wing subsequently started to gain ground in the party at the expense of the Bern-wing, and the party became increasingly centralised as a national party, in contrast to the traditional Swiss system of parties with loose organisational structures and weak central powers. During the 1990s, the party also doubled its number of cantonal branches (to eventually be represented in all cantons), which strengthened the power of the Zürich-wing since most new sections supported their agenda. Although Swiss political parties tended to lack dominant national leaders, Blocher became the de facto leader of the national SVP and one of the most famous Swiss politicians.

In 1991, the party for the first time became the strongest party in Zürich, with 20.2% of the vote. It also broke through in the early 1990s in both Zürich and Switzerland as a whole, and experienced dramatically increasing results in elections. From being the smallest of the four governing parties at the start of the 1990s, the party by the end of the decade emerged as the strongest party in Switzerland. At the same time, the party expanded its electoral base towards new voter demographics. The SVP in general won its best results in cantons where the cantonal branches adopted the agenda of the Zürich wing. In the 1999 federal election, the SVP for the first time became the strongest party in Switzerland with 22.5% of the vote, a 12.6% share increase. This was the biggest increase of votes for any party in the entire history of the Swiss proportional electoral system, which was introduced in 1919.

=== Libel incident ===
In 1997 a speech, Blocher stated, "The Jewish organizations that demand money, claim that ultimately it is not about money. But let's be honest: This is exactly what it is about." These remarks were in relation to a World Jewish Congress-initiated lawsuit calling for restitution of Nazi-seized assets that were hidden in Swiss banks. The following day, the tabloid Sonntags-Blick published an article with the headline "Blocher: The Jews are all about money." Blocher filed for libel against the editor-in-chief of the tabloid. The district court acquitted the journalist because Blocher "unrestrainedly addressed anti-Semitic instincts." Blocher appealed the verdict. Before the Zürich supreme court, the two parties agreed on a settlement. Later the chairman of the 4th bureau of the Zürich district court filed a criminal complaint against Blocher on the grounds that the preoccupation with the speech had let them believe that Blocher had violated the law on racism. The district court requested to lift the immunity of Blocher, which he enjoyed through his office as a member of the National Council. Both chambers of the parliament denied the request.

== Federal councillor ==
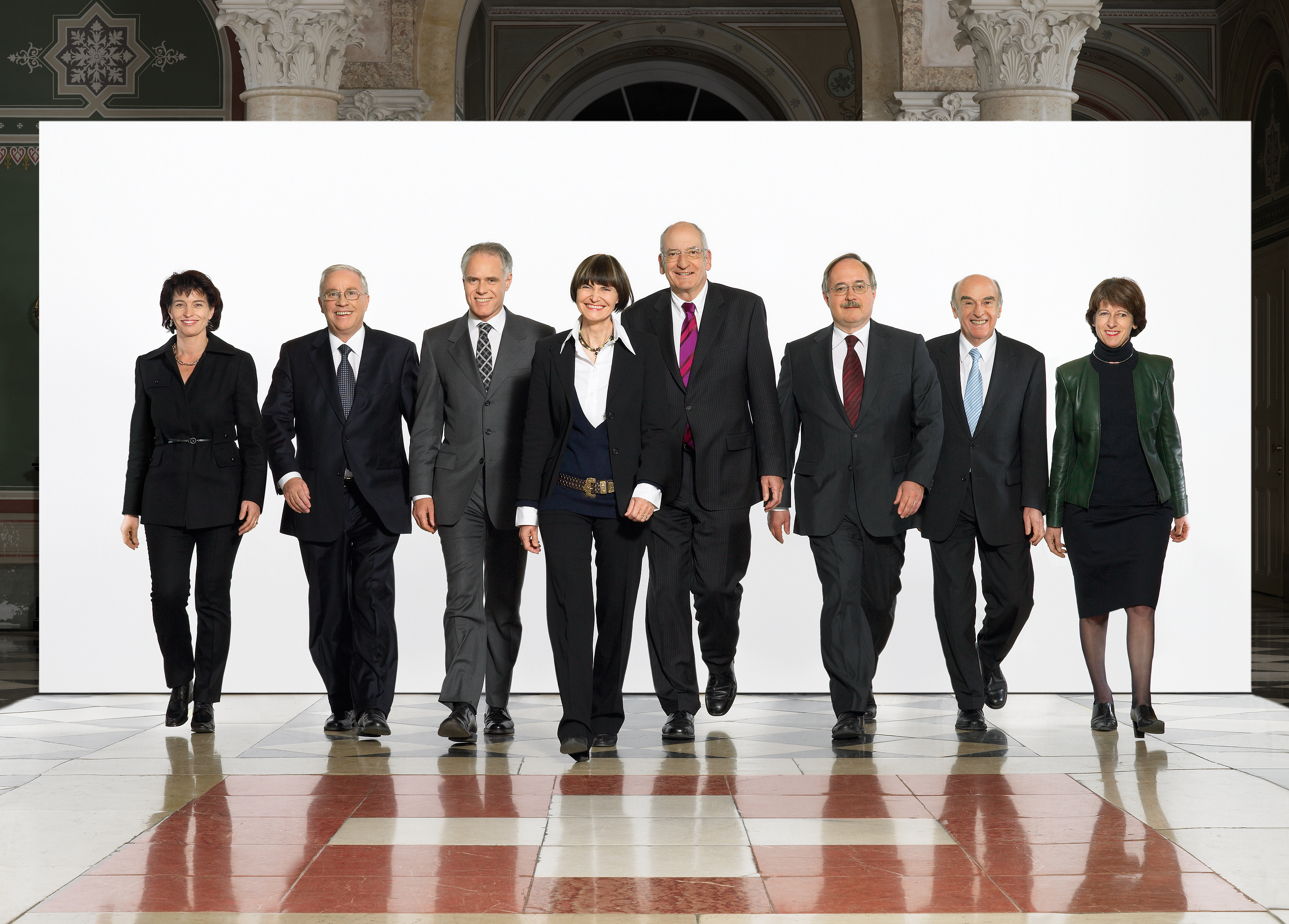
Official Swiss Federal Council photo for 2007. Blocher is the second person from the left.

=== 2003 election ===
The People's Party emerged as the largest party in the National Council in the Federal Assembly election of 19 October 2003 with 26.6% of the vote. Blocher personally topped the poll in Zürich, and became Switzerland's most prominent and controversial politician. Since 1929, the People's Party (known until 1971 as the Party of Farmers, Traders and Independents [BGB]) had held a seat on the seven-member Swiss Federal Council. At the time the current coalition formed in 1959, the BGB was the smallest party represented on the Council. By 2003 it had become the largest party, and demanded another seat at the expense of the Christian Democrats, now the smallest party. The SVP nominated Blocher as its second candidate. This generated a good deal of controversy; previously most SVP councillors had come from the party's more moderate centrist-agrarian wing.

After threats of pulling the other People's Party member, Samuel Schmid (a member of the centrist wing), off the council and going into opposition, Blocher was elected on 10 December 2003. He took the seat of Ruth Metzler-Arnold, only the third federal councillor in history (and the first since 1872) not to be reelected. In the third round Blocher beat Metzler with 121 to 116 votes. The election was anticipated as a major media event, and was widely watched as a live broadcast. After Blocher's election, members of the Swiss political Left spontaneously protested. As a result of a reshuffling of Federal Council seats, Blocher became head of the Federal Department of Justice and Police.

=== Controversies ===
During 2004, Blocher's unconventionally unaccommodating stance towards his fellow federal councillors was the cause for speculations about the future of the Swiss concordance system. He was attacked by his colleague Pascal Couchepin in an interview with the NZZ newspaper in the Sunday edition of 3 October. This was unprecedented in Switzerland; members of the Federal Council traditionally do not publicly criticise each other. In a public speech held at his cantonal party's annual Albisgüetlitagung in Zürich on 20 January 2006, Blocher labeled two Albanians seeking political asylum as "criminals", although no judicial verdict had been reached at the time. Later, when confronted, he claimed before the Swiss Council of States (the upper house) that he had only used the word 'accused'. Since the speech had been recorded, he then had to admit that he had used the word "criminals". In July 2006, a commission of the Council of States reprimanded Blocher, stating that the setting of false prejudice and making false statement to the Council of States constituted unacceptable behaviour for a Federal Councillor.

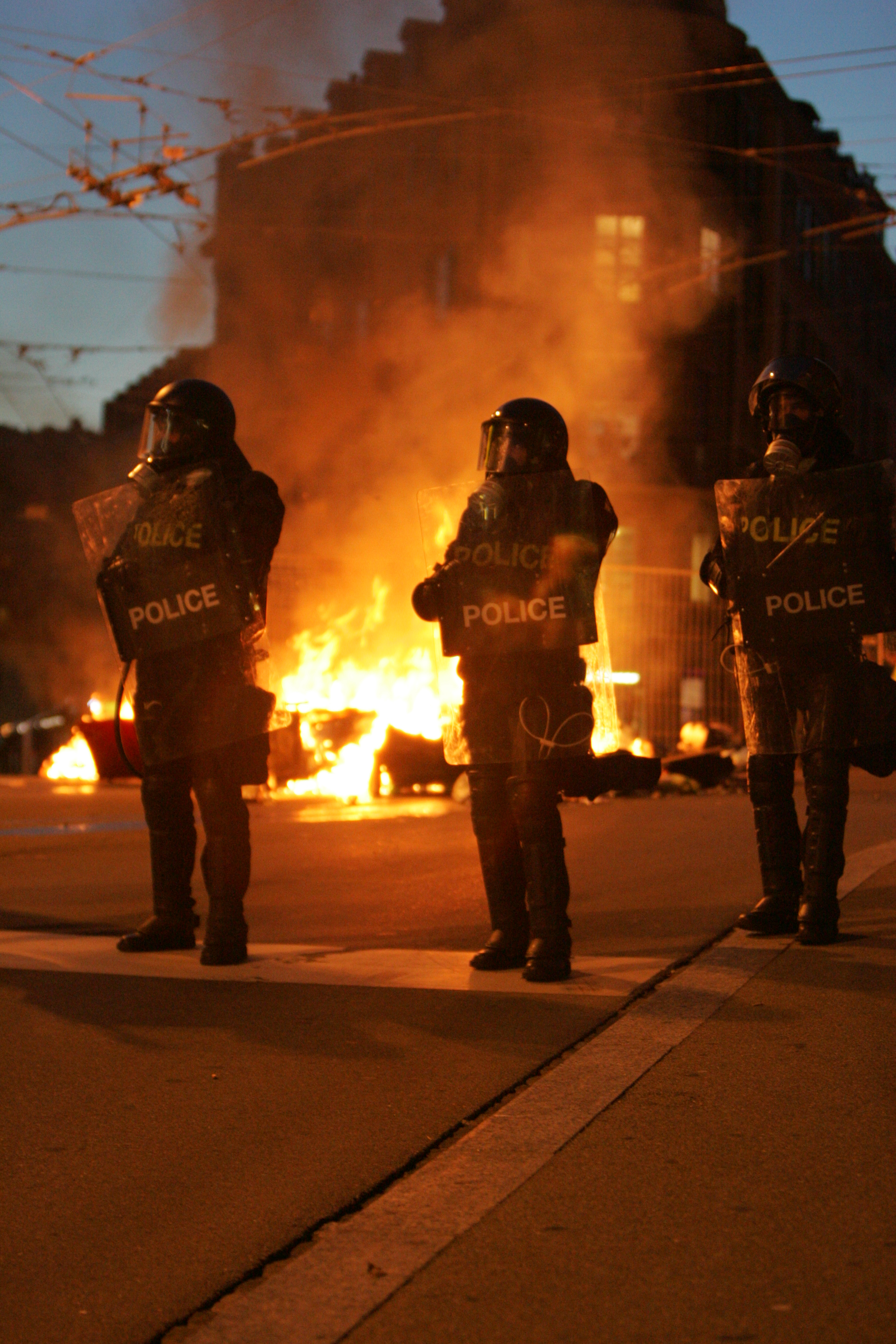
Civil unrest in Lausanne in the wake of anti-Blocher protests of 18 September 2007

On 5 September 2007, a parliamentary committee sharply criticised Blocher for overstepping his mandate in his handling of the resignation of former chief prosecutor Valentin Roschacher in 2006. In addition, documents confiscated in March by the German authorities from private banker Oskar Holenweger under suspicion of money laundering were presented as supporting a possible involvement of Blocher in a plot to oust Roschacher from office. Blocher denied any involvement in such a plan. These developments happened to coincide with a campaign alleging a "secret plan to oust Blocher" initiated by the SVP on 27 August, and party spokesperson S. R. Jäggi on 6 September confirmed that campaign was referring to the documents incriminating Blocher in the Roschacher affair now revealed. Tension surrounding the "Blocher-Roschacher affair" was fuelled by the upcoming 2007 federal election. On 25 September, the National Council (the lower house) decided to press a debate of the affair before the elections, overturning a decision by the council's office.

Blocher was a target for the opposition on 18 September 2007, when his appearance at the Comptoir suisse (Swiss fair) in Lausanne was disrupted by protesters. In January 2012, it was reported that Blocher had received information from an unnamed whistleblower regarding foreign exchange trades at Bank Sarasin made by Swiss National Bank chairman Philipp Hildebrand's wife Kashya. The alleged whistleblower was subsequently fired and faced criminal investigations under Swiss banking secrecy laws. Hildebrand denied accusations of insider trading, claimed to be the "victim of a smear campaign" and said that his political foes endangered the secrecy laws and "the interests of Switzerland" with the accusations. Blocher had called for Hildebrand's resignation in 2011 in the wake of SNB's foreign exchange-related losses and continued strong calls after the FX-trades story grew, before Hildebrand ultimately resigned.

=== 2007 failed reelection ===
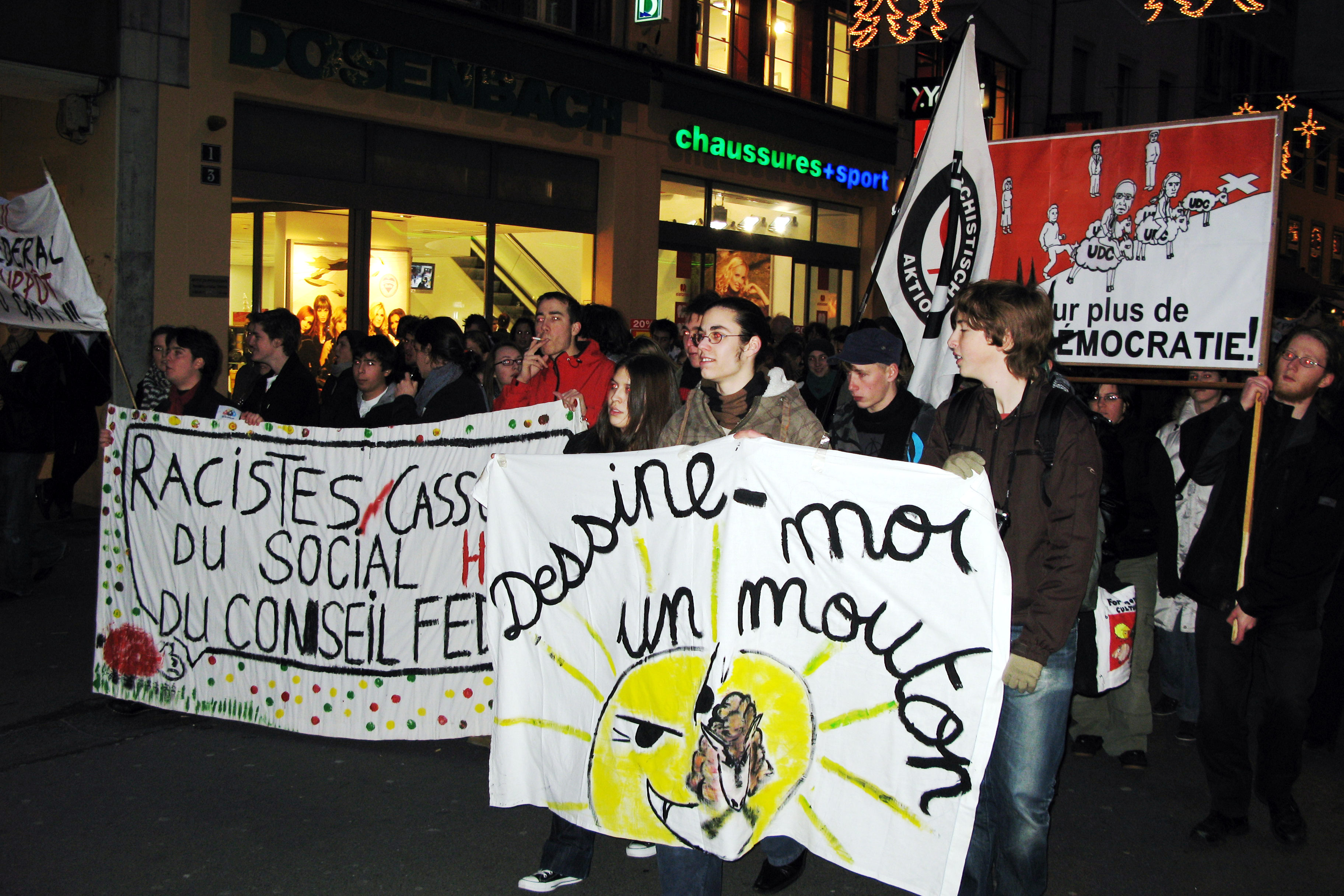
Demonstration in Lausanne on 8 December to call for Christoph Blocher to be ousted from the Federal Council in the upcoming elections. Blocher was replaced by Eveline Widmer-Schlumpf four days later.

In the Swiss Federal Council elections of 12 December 2007, Blocher did not receive the necessary number of votes in the parliament to retain his seat. In his stead, the parliament elected Eveline Widmer-Schlumpf (a moderate SVP member), who accepted the mandate on 13 December 2007. Blocher thus became the fourth federal councillor to be ousted from office in the history of the Swiss Federal State, following Ruth Metzler whom he had replaced the previous term, besides Ulrich Ochsenbein and Jean-Jacques Challet-Venel in the 19th century. As of 2024, he is the most recent federal councillor to leave office having never served as president of the Swiss Confederation.

=== 2008 candidacy ===
Following the resignation of federal councillor Samuel Schmid on 12 November 2008, Blocher decided to run for the office again. The People's Party nominated him together with Ueli Maurer. In view of the 2007 election results, Blocher's chances to be re-elected were thought to be very slim. Not surprisingly, he had no chance of being re-elected and had to make room for his party colleague Ueli Maurer, who won the election in the end.

== Post councillorship ==
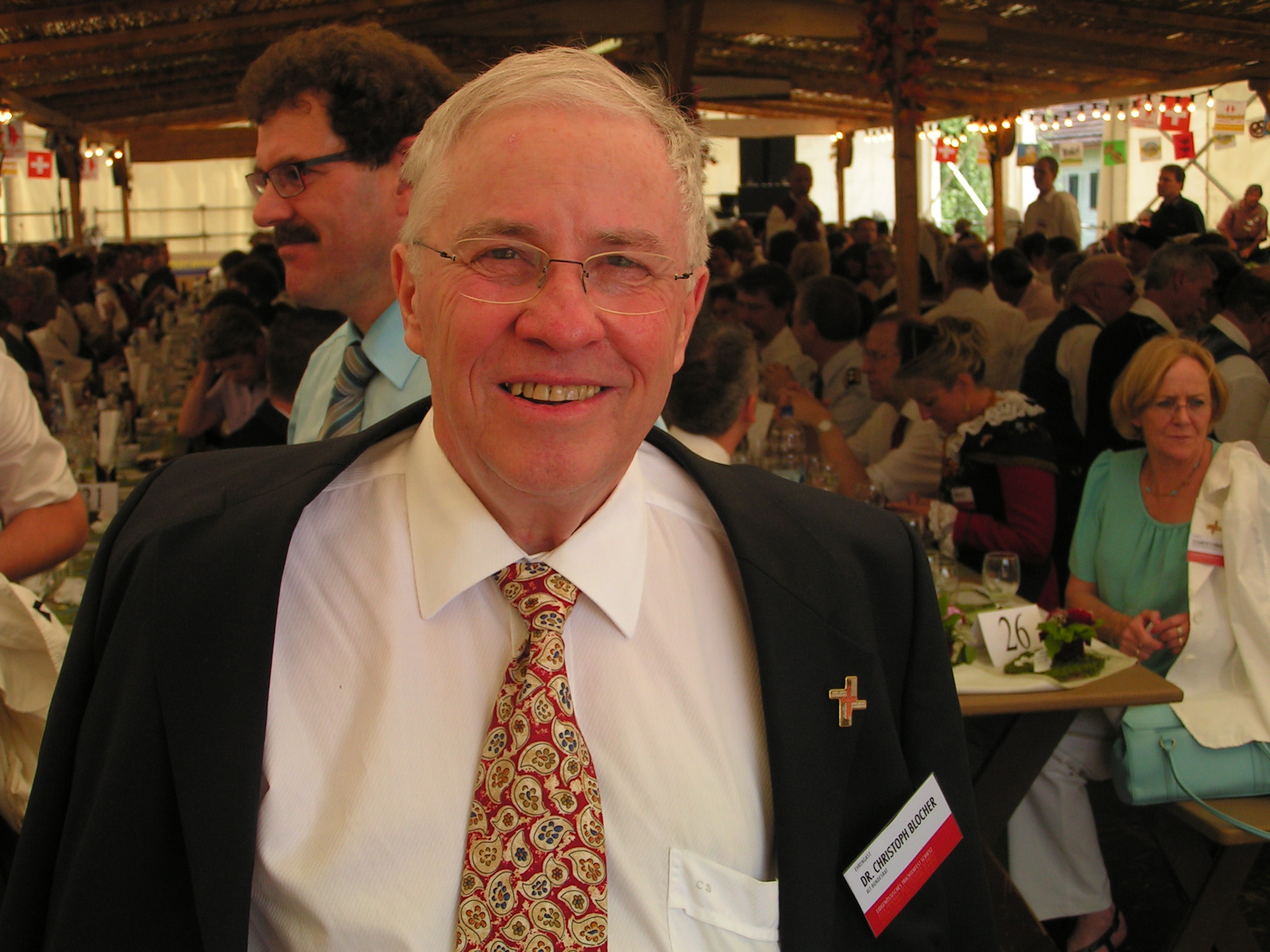
Blocher in 2010 as an honorary guest at the Swiss National Trachtenfest (folk costume festival) in Schwyz

In 2008, Blocher became one of the five vice presidents of the SVP. After the extremely large 2007–2008 losses posted by UBS, its chairman Marcel Ospel resigned on 1 April 2008, and Blocher was rumoured to be considered as his replacement. However the role went to Peter Kurer, the bank's general counsel. Blocher was important in the success of the 9 February 2014 referendum on immigration quotas in Switzerland and continues to support policies designed to limit immigration to Switzerland.

Returning to the National Council in 2011, Blocher announced that he would resign on 31 May 2014, saying that he was "wasting too much time in parliament" and that he wanted to focus on other political priorities like the implementation of the successful referendum result and a planned initiative on preventing Switzerland joining the European Union.

In January 2012, Blocher was questioned by the Zurich prosecutor's office as a so-called Auskunftsperson, a status under the code of criminal procedure that falls between that of an accused person and a witness. That year, he faced allegations of complicity in a violation of banking secrecy. The proceedings against Blocher were later dropped by the Zurich prosecutor's office, as no criminal acts could be proven against him.

In January 2016, soon after the 2015 federal election, where the Swiss People's Party received record gains, Blocher announced that he would not stand for reelection as vice president of the SVP when his term ended in April. Despite this, Blocher stated that he would remain involved in politics and would "push his anti-EU and anti-immigration campaigns", and he would remain in a senior position in the SVP. Blocher supported the popular initiative "For the effective expulsion of foreign criminals", held on 28 February 2016, but after its rejection, Blocher urged the SVP to use its position in the government, rather than popular initiatives, to advance its agenda.

In an interview in April 2016, Blocher stated that United States president Ronald Reagan "was the best president I have seen" and that he thought that, like Reagan, then-presidential candidate Donald Trump would be underestimated but more competent and great than expected. After Trump's election victory, Blocher stated that his victory was a warning to world leaders not to ignore the people's concerns on issues such as immigration, saying "people feel powerless against those who rule them, and for them, Trump is a release valve." Blocher continued advocating against Swiss membership in the European Union, and for strengthing Swiss neutrality. In March 2018, the SVP announced that Blocher would resign as the party's chief strategist, though he would continue to remain involved in Swiss politics. On 19 January 2024, Blocher announced he would retire from politics.

== Public image ==
Blocher is seen by some political observers as the face of the SVP, and his presence in the party was a major factor in voter turnout among SVP voters. Damir Skenderovic, professor at the University of Fribourg has compared Blocher to Jörg Haider of the Freedom Party of Austria and Alliance for the Future of Austria, to Carl I. Hagen of the Norwegian Progress Party, and to Umberto Bossi of the Italian Lega Nord. According to Steve Bannon, an American right-wing populist political and media figure, Blocher was "Trump before Trump", in reference to the 45th U.S. president Donald Trump, because of his early opposition to the European Union.

== Personal life ==
On 4 October 1967, Blocher married Silvia Kaiser (born 1945), a primary school teacher, a daughter of Willy and Lony Kaiser, both of Wald, Zürich, in Weinfelden. Her father was the president of a civil engineering firm. They have four children;

- Magdalena Blocher (born 1969), majority shareholder of EMS-Chemie and member of the National Council, married to Roberto Martullo, has three children.
- Markus Blocher (born 1971), businessman and majority shareholder of Dottikon ES, married, has seven children.
- Miriam Blocher (born 1975), businesswoman and majority shareholder of Läckerli Huus, married to Matthias Baumann, has two children.
- Rahel Blocher (born 1976), never married and no children.

Blocher has resided in Feldmeilen since the 1970s until relocating into his newly-built residence Haus zum Rosenhorn in Herrliberg in the early 2000s. The house has ever since expanded to a compound which not only is a private residence but also seat to his investment and holding companies and his art collection. The property is named after the Rosenhorn, which is in his place of origin, Schattenhalb. Additionally, Blocher retains the lifetime right of residence at the Rhäzüns Castle, in Rhäzüns, Grisons, which has been owned by EMS-Chemie since 1946. He restored the castle thoroughly and takes no government subsidies for its maintenance, which nets about $550,000 annually. Blocher has never owned a television.

== See also ==
- Minaret controversy in Switzerland
- Campaign for an Independent and Neutral Switzerland

== Bibliography ==
- Skenderovic, Damir (2009). The radical right in Switzerland: continuity and change, 1945-2000. Berghahn Books. ISBN 978-1-84545-580-4.
- Cormon, Pierre (2014). Swiss Politics for Complete Beginners. Editions Slatkine. ISBN 978-2-8321-0607-5. Archived from the original on 4 November 2014.

Political offices
Preceded by Ruth Metzler	Member of the Swiss Federal Council; 2004–2007	Succeeded by Eveline Widmer-Schlumpf
