= Rivella =

Swiss soft drink derived from milk whey

- Red Rivella logo
- Type: Soft drink
- Manufacturer: Rivella SA
- Origin: Switzerland
- Introduced: 1952
- Ingredients: Water, whey, carbonic acid
- Variants: Red, Blue, Green, Refresh, Grapefruit, Mint (Switzerland); Yellow, CLIQ Peach, CLIQ Rhubarb, Elderflower (Switzerland, discontinued); Original, Green tea, Cranberry, Pineapple, Raspberry (Netherlands), Peach Zero
- Website: www.rivella.ch

Rivella is a soft drink from Switzerland, created by Robert Barth in 1952, which is produced from milk whey, and therefore includes ingredients such as lactose, lactic acid and minerals. Other than Switzerland, it is sold in several other countries and is available in several varieties depending on the country.

== History ==
In 1950 Robert Barth and the biologist Hans Süsli Zurich used a recipe initially conceived to produce a beer made with whey to create a soft drink, which came to be marketed as Rivella Red in 1952, when Rivella AG was founded. The name Rivella was inspired by the municipality of Riva San Vitale in Canton Ticino and the Italian word for "revelation", rivelazione. The initial production began in Stäfa before moving to Rothrist, where it remains to this day. A second variety of Rivella was launched in 1958 in the Netherlands and in 1959 in Switzerland, known as Rivella Blue, a lower calorie alternative to the original recipe. It was the first diet soft drink to be launched in Europe. A third variety, Rivella Green, was launched in 1999 made with green tea extract, and Rivella Yellow, made with soy milk as an alternative to milk whey, in 2008.

In 2000 the presidency was passed on from Robert Barth to his son Alexander Barth, before the death of Robert Barth in 2007.

Until 2008, Swiss supermarket chain Migros stocked an own-brand version of the beverage called Mivella, which was made by Rivella specifically for the supermarket. In 2008, Migros replaced it with Rivella as it did not enjoy the same popularity among customers as the original drink. In February 2022, in a further attempt to compete with Rivella, Migros revived the competitor drink "Prego", which dates back to 1956 when it was created by Robert Schlör.

In 1977 Rivella began sponsoring the Swiss National Ski team. In 2017 they celebrated 40 years of partnership in St. Moritz.

== Ingredients ==
The ingredients of Rivella Red are as follows:

- Water
- Milk whey (35%)
- Sugar
- Carbonic acid
- Acidity regulator (L(+)-Lactic Acid)
- Acidifier (L(+)-Lactic Acid)
- Caramelised sugar
- Natural flavourings
- Rivella Red contains 160 kJ of energy (approx. 37 kcal) per 100 ml as 9 g of sugar.
- Rivella Blue contains 1.4 grams of lactose per 100 ml and artificial sweeteners (cyclamate, acesulfame K) instead of refined sugar. This reduces the energy content to 30 kJ (approx. 7 kcal) per 100 ml.
- Rivella Green Tea also contains green tea extracts (0.05%). Its energy content is 90 kJ (approx. 22 kcal) per 100 ml.

== Varieties ==
Nutrition facts for Swiss varieties of Rivella (per 100 ml)
Flavor	Years of production	Energy	Fat	Carbohydrate	Protein	Salt
Rivella Red	since 1952	37 kcal	0 g	9 g	0 g	0.03 g
Rivella Blue	since 1959	7 kcal	0 g	1.5 g	0 g	0.03 g
Rivella Green Tea	since 1999	22 kcal	0 g	5 g	0 g	0.02 g
Rivella Refresh	since 2018	21 kcal	0 g	5.2 g	0 g	0.02 g
Rivella Grapefruit	since 2021	19 kcal	0 g	4.7 g	0 g	0.02 g
Rivella Swiss Mint	since 2021	19 kcal	0 g	4.7 g	0 g	0.02 g
Rivella Peach Zero	2026 (Limited Edition)	8 kcal	0 g	0 g	0 g	0.03 g
Discontinued flavors
Flavor	Years of production	Energy	Fat	Carbohydrate	Protein	Salt
Rivella Yellow	2008–2011	13 kcal	0 g	3.1 g	0 g	0.02 g
Rivella Peach	2014–2016	35 kcal	0 g	8.4 g	0 g	0.03 g
Rivella Tropical Mango	2016–2018	35 kcal	0 g	8.4 g	0 g	0.03 g
Rivella Rhubarb	2014–2019	35 kcal	0 g	8.4 g	0 g	0.03 g
Rivella Elderflower	2019–2021	35 kcal	0 g	8.4 g	0 g	0.03 g
Source: Nutrition facts of Rivella products

== Availability ==
Rivella is seen as Switzerland's national beverage. The share by value of Rivella AG in the Swiss soft drinks market was 15.3 per cent in 2013, putting Rivella second to Coca-Cola. Rivella is a long-established brand in the Principality of Liechtenstein, the Netherlands and Luxembourg. Rivella Light was launched as a diabetic beverage in the Netherlands in 1958. It appeared on the Swiss market one year later (1959) as Rivella Blue. The Netherlands remains the largest foreign market for Rivella. Rivella is also available in the regions bordering Switzerland in Germany, France and Austria. Rivella beverages available abroad are made to the same recipe as in Switzerland except the Netherlands, where beverages are made by Rivella licensing partner Vrumona using concentrate supplied by Rivella.

Rivella was available in stores in the United States, but it is no longer available in that way. American customers can still order it online.

== See also ==
- Culinary Heritage of Switzerland
