= Peter Hug =

Swiss historian

Peter Hug (born in 1955) is a Swiss historian. From 2004 to 2020 he was the Foreign Affairs Secretary of the left-wing Social Democratic Party of Switzerland. He was also a founding member of Swiss advocacy and research organization swisspeace.

== Contributions to debate about Switzerland's role during World War II ==
In connection with the proceedings initiated in 1995 regarding heirless Jewish assets at Swiss banks, Hug was tasked by the Swiss government to investigate what happened to assets held in Swiss banks by citizens of Poland, Hungary, Romania, and other Eastern European countries, many of whom were Jewish. These assets became a point of contention after World War II, when Switzerland offered them to their respective countries in exchange for compensation for Swiss assets lost due to nationalization under communist rule. Switzerland had signed Treaties to pursue this aim with Poland in 1949, Hungary in 1950 and Romania in 1951.

=== Report about expropriation of Jewish depositors ===
In the final report, Hug accused former Federal Councilor and Justice Minister Kurt Furgler, who was responsible for implementing these treaties, of having advocated for “a bending of the law”. Hug alleged that Furgler suggested to the Federal Council that, despite the lack of a legal basis to do so, all assets of depositors from states with whom treaties were conducted, with the exception of Poland and Hungary, were to be handed over to a general fund for the support of former World War II refugees or given directly to the Swiss Federation of Jewish Communities. This was deemed a de facto expropriation by Hug, as once the funds were moved and commingled, any existing individual heirs would have had a low chance of retrieving them.

In the cases of Poland and Hungary where money was transferred to the respective governments, Hug found that Switzerland did not hand over the list of names of account holders. The Swiss government cited Swiss bank secrecy laws as well as concerns about possible Communist persecution of any heirs to the accounts.

While accepting responsibility to compensate any heirs to the funds transferred to Poland, Hungary and any of the other then-Communist Eastern European governments under the aforementioned treaties, as well as publicize names of account holders, the Federal Council rejected and criticized the specific allegation made against Furgler in a press release.

=== Researcher for the Bergier Commission ===
Hug was later hired by the Independent Commission of Experts Switzerland – World War II (often called the Bergier Commission) to conduct an investigation. This was published in 2002 under the title "Swiss armaments industry and war material trade during the National Socialist period: corporate strategies - market development - political surveillance".

== Research on the relations between Switzerland and apartheid South Africa ==
As part of the Swiss government-funded national research program "Relationship Switzerland - South Africa", Hug dealt with the relationship between Switzerland and the South African apartheid government. He wrote a report on the military, armaments industry and nuclear relations between Switzerland and South Africa. His findings received international press coverage.

Hug came to the conclusion that Swiss companies such as Sulzer supplied important components for South Africa's uranium enrichment, which provided the necessary fissile material for the six atomic bombs produced by South Africa. After the Federal Council ordered a partial blocking of access to relevant files in the Swiss Federal Archives in 2003, in view of the threat of class action lawsuits against Swiss banks by victims of apartheid, Hug gave Swiss newspapers critical interviews on this subject. This blocking of files only restricted Hug's work to a limited extent, since he was also researching relevant files in both government and privately owned South African archives.

== Views ==
=== On civil service in Switzerland ===
In 2000 Hug, already an opponent of military conscription, authored a controversial report questioning the economic value of the creation of a mandatory civil service in Switzerland as an alternative to mandatory military service. One of his key arguments was that the duties of the civil service could be performed by private companies, generating jobs.

=== On Swiss policy regarding the Russian invasion of Ukraine ===
Hug strongly criticized Swiss military neutrality regarding the Russian invasion of Ukraine in multiple interviews given in Switzerland. In one he was quoted saying that “Whoever in a typically ‘neutral’ manner, does not distinguish between the aggressor and the attacked declares moral bankruptcy”. He further stated that “In particular, the Swiss commodity trading center, which is benefiting massively from Putin's war and is helping to finance it, naturally sees no problem in remaining ‘neutral’ “. In a May 2024 op-ed in Swiss daily newspaper Neue Zürcher Zeitung, Hug called Swiss neutrality in relation to the invasion of Ukraine "dysfunctional" and stated that Switzerland needed to rethink its entire defence policy. He also called for Switzerland to send more humanitarian aid to Ukraine and reiterated that the Swiss authorities should more strongly help the European Union enforce existing sanctions against Russia, while acknowledging that "no one expects [Switzerland] to join NATO... or send troops to Ukraine".

=== On Swiss purchases of F-35 jets ===
Hug is an opponent of the Swiss Army purchasing American-manufactured F-35 fighter jets for its Airforce. He affirmed that Switzerland needs fighter jets, "but not for surprise attacks deep in enemy territory, rather ones that are adapted to our defensive needs.” and that "The F-35s are operationally the wrong ones and financially a bottomless pit."

== Personal life ==
Peter Hug is from the city of Bern.

According to German commentator Lutz Unterseher who worked with him in the 1990s on a study about the Swiss Army, Hug was a conscientious objector in his youth and refused to participate in Swiss mandatory military service.
