= Ems-Chemie =

Swiss holding company

Ems-Chemie Holding AG
- Company type: Aktiengesellschaft
- Traded as: SIX: EMSN; SMI MID component
- Industry: Chemicals
- Founded: 1936
- Founder: Werner L. Oswald
- Headquarters: Domat/Ems, Switzerland
- Key people: Magdalena Martullo-Blocher (CEO), Ulf Berg
- Products: High-performance plastics, Speciality chemicals
- Revenue: 2,146 million CHF (2017)
- Number of employees: 2,865 (2014)
- Website: ems-group.com

Ems-Chemie is a Swiss corporate group based in Domat/Ems, in the canton of Graubünden, whose companies are grouped under "Ems-Chemie Holding". This is the only listed company belonging to the scope of consolidation and is listed on the SIX Swiss Exchange. On 31 December 2013, the stock market capitalization reached CHF 7.4 billion. The main shareholders are "Emesta Holding AG" with 60.82% and Miriam Blocher with 8.89%.

== Organization ==
Ems-Chemie is represented in 22 countries and produces at 26 production sites in 16 countries, with the main location in Domat/Ems. In 2013, the Group's production focus was in Europe (Switzerland 46.2%, Germany 12.2%), followed by the USA (9.2%) and Asia (China 7.3%, Japan 6.6%). The largest sales markets of the Group are Germany (21.9%), China (14.0%) and the USA (11.9%).

The Ems Group is structured in branches for high-performance Polymere (Ems-Grivory and Ems-Eftec), with sales of CHF 1.6 billion, and specialty chemicals (Ems-Griltec and Ems-Patvag), with sales of CHF 0.3 billion. Ems-Eftec offers equipment and materials for the automobile industry in the fields of gluing (body parts), densities (welding seams), vapors (vibration of the sheet metal) and protection (plastisols for the body). Ems-Grivory produces high-performance polymers that are delivered to customers as granules. From these high-performance polymers, the customers manufacture plastic parts, for automobile engineering, mobile phones, display windows, LEDs, packaging, baby bottles, eyeglasses, etc. Ems-Griltech produces hot-melt adhesives (for clothing, automobile electronics, packaging, composites) as well as separating and adhesive yarns for the textile industry, fibers for press felts (i.e. paper machine felts), powder coatings (i.e. glass and aluminum faucets, machines, appliances, radiators) which are heat, UV and cold resistant. Ems-Patvag develops and produces igniters (ei. airbags, belt tensioners) for safety systems in the automobile sector.

== History ==
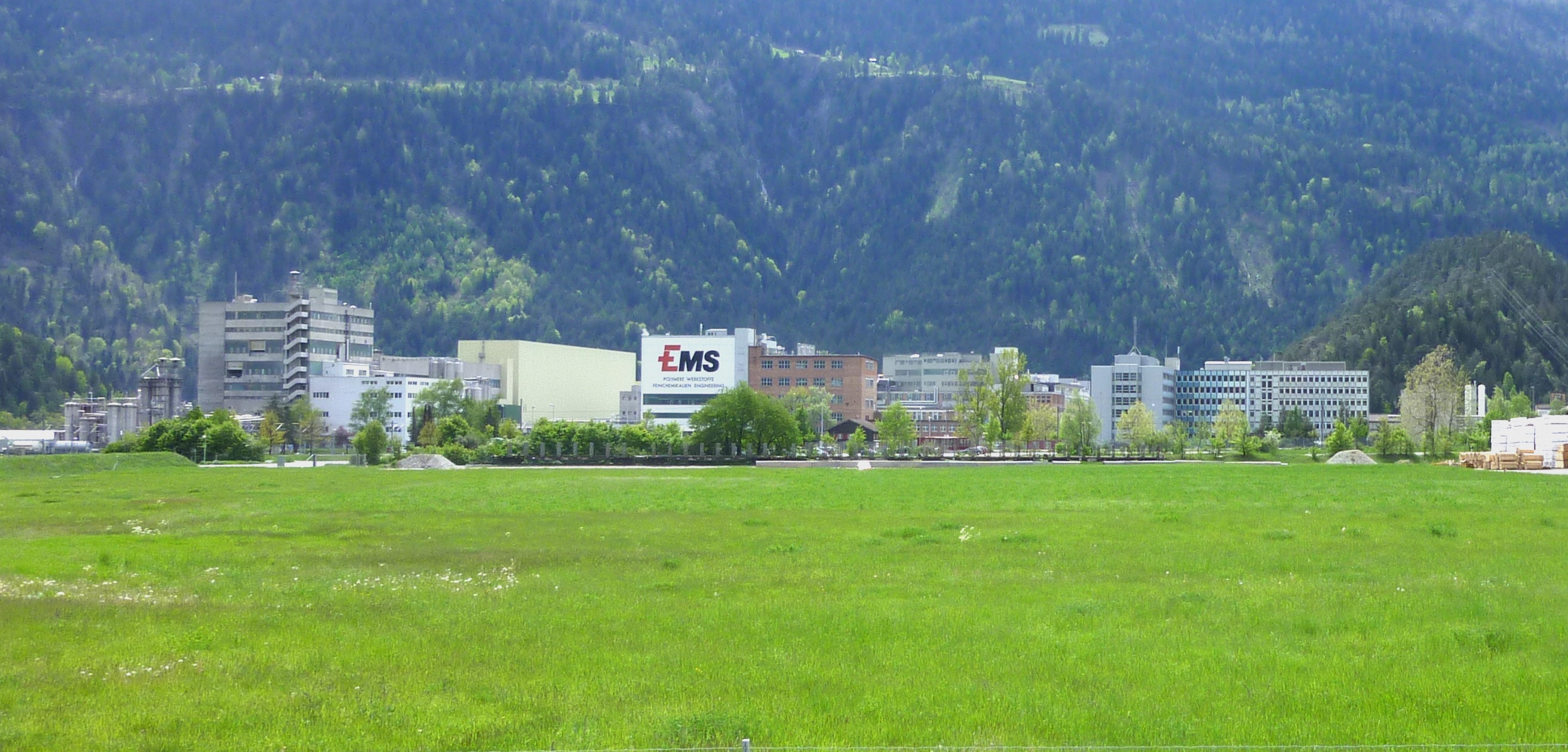
Ems-Chemie headquarters in Domat/Ems

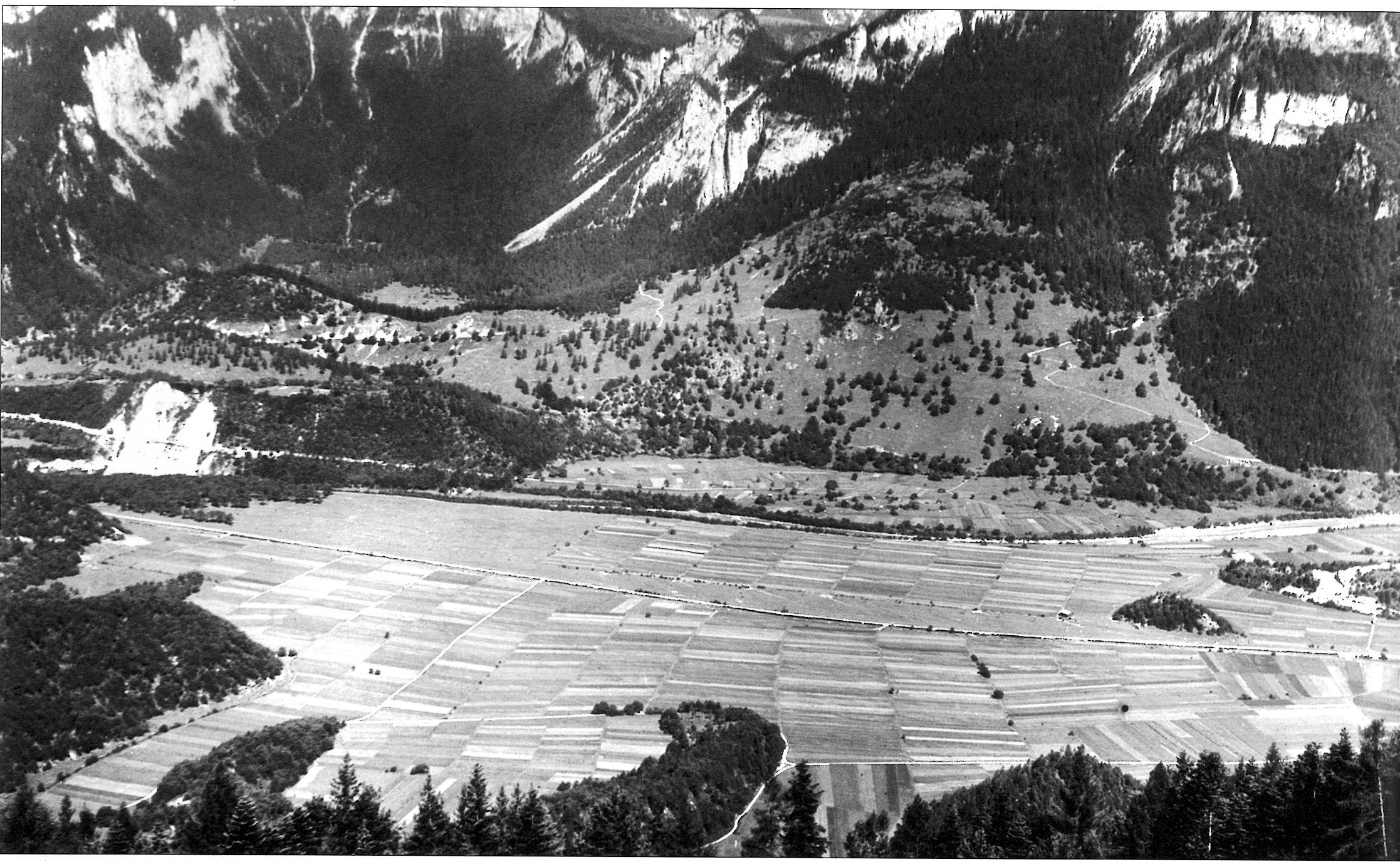
Ems Valley around 1920. On the left are the works of Ems-Chemie.

=== The founding of Hovag ===
In 1936 Werner Oswald founded "Holzverzuckerungs AG" ("Hovag") based in Zürich, to produce, among other things, a fuel additive for motor vehicles made from wood ethyl alcohol using the Scholler method in Domat. On 23 August 1940, the Swiss Federal Council approved the production of 20,000 hl of fuel and the company secured funds needed for production. This product was added to gasoline and the high costs were subsidized by federal funding. Due to scarcity of raw materials as a result of the Second World War, on 24 March 1941, a contract with delivery and pick up obligation of more than 98200 tons of fuel was made, with an end date of the 31. In march 1955, including production costs, (including provisions and repayment of state employment contributions). Through this, until the end of the Second World War 30% of the fuel requirements were covered in Switzerland. In addition, on 25 June 1942, a further contract was created for the supply of 2000 tons of feed yeast per year, of which only a total of 2639 tons were delivered due to supply shortages. From 1944 to 1947, the company invested in patents and administrations AG ("Patvag AG"), a sister company of "Hovag", focused on hydropower plants, in order to secure their energy supplies. In 1948, Hovag began producing ammonia, in 1949 urea synthesis, and in the 1950s Hovag began with the production of caprolactam from which polyamide plastics and, from the subsidiary company, Fibron S.A., polyamide fibers (brand names Grilon) were made. Shortly afterwards, the first foreign sales company was founded, GRILON & Plastics Machinery Ltd. based in Dover (UK). In 1954 the "Hovag" was one of the largest employers with 1015 employees and consumed about half of the electrical energy of the canton of Graubünden. [9] When, on 13 May 1956, a national referendum decided against the further subsidization of «Hovag» for the years 1956 to 1960 in the amount of CHF 28.3 million, it stopped the production of ethyl alcohol.

In 1947, "Inventa AG" was founded for research and patent utilization (later, process engineering and plant engineering were combined). In the mid-1950s "Inventa" built more than 300 plants (117 in China) for caprolactam, plastics and synthetic fibers.

Before its acquisition by Christoph Blocher, Ems-Chemie was developing a kind of napalm weapon in the 1950s that was used in Indonesia and Yemen.

=== The years since 1960 ===
In 1960, "Hovag" was renamed "Emser Werke AG". The founding in 1962 of Chemie Holding Ems AG was listed for the first time on the Vorbörse Zurich on 17 December 1962. In the 1960s, "Emser Werke AG" expanded its product portfolio on an ongoing basis and established independent subsidiaries. In 1963, EMS Patvag was founded for ignition systems. In 1972, Christoph Blocher, who had entered the legal department as a student in 1969, was elected chairman of the board of directors and delegate of the board of directors. In 1978, the various Ems companies were merged under the umbrella of the Chemie Holding Ems AG. On 23 February 1979, the founder Werner Oswald died in the middle of a meeting. As Christoph Blocher continued to lead the company, he began to focus on engineering plastics and changed the name to "Ems Chemie Holding AG" and "Ems Chemie AG" in 1981.

In 1983, he was commissioned, by the founding Oswald family, to find a buyer for the shares of Ems Chemie Holding AG. Blocher decided to take over the Oswald family's share package himself and therefore had the majority voting power at the company. In the following years Ems expanded and took over several other companies. In 1988 Ems focused on the three business areas polymeric materials, fine chemicals (EMS Dottikon) and engineering.

Amongst the new products, which were developed continuously, was a highly rigid polyamide in 1991. A year later the «Ems» celebrated its 50th birthday of production. In 1997, the "Ems Togo" business unit entered into a joint venture with H.B. Fuller Automotive USA, which appeared under the name of "Eftec". Three years later there was a joint venture between «Eftec» and the Czech company D-Plast to open up the Central and Eastern European market.

In 2000, the group was made up of four main self-employed companies "Ems Grivory" (technical thermoplastics), "Ems Griltec" (technical fibers and adhesives), "Ems Primid" (thermosets), "Ems Services" (central services workshop Domat / Ems). The following year Blochers eldest daughter Magdalena Martullo joined the company. At the beginning of 2003, the Blocher family decided that the "Ems" should remain a publicly traded shares company and introduced the unit names shares.

On 10 December 2003, Christoph Blocher was elected to the Federal Council. Since a Federal Council member is not allowed to have any economic connections, he gave up all his positions at the "Ems" group and sold his majority stake in "Ems Chemie-Holding AG" to his four children on 30 December. On 1 January 2004, his daughter, Magdalena, took over the group management as vice-president and Delegate of the board of directors. In the same year "Ems Grivory" was divided into the independent areas "Ems GrivoryEuropa", "Ems Grivory America" and "Ems Grivory Asia".

In 2005, Blocher's son Markus's, «Ems Dottikon», was split up as an independent company. The three sisters surrendered their shares to their brother and in return received shares in "Emesta Holding AG". This meant that the three sisters held the majority of shares of Ems-Chemie Holding. In the following year, the "Tegra" biomass power plant (wood-chip power plant) was put into operation, reducing CO_{2} emissions at the Domat / Ems plant by 80%.

In 2007, Miriam Blocher reduced her stake in "Ems-Chemie Holding", the majority was now owned by Magdalena Martullo-Blocher and Rahel Blocher. "Ems Togo" took over all the joint venture shares of H.B. Fuller and changed the name to «Ems Eftec». In the same year, the special polymers of «Ems Grivory» received the drinking water permit, which allowed new applications in the sanitary sector to be realized. In the following years, "Ems" launched a series of new products and opened new production sites worldwide.

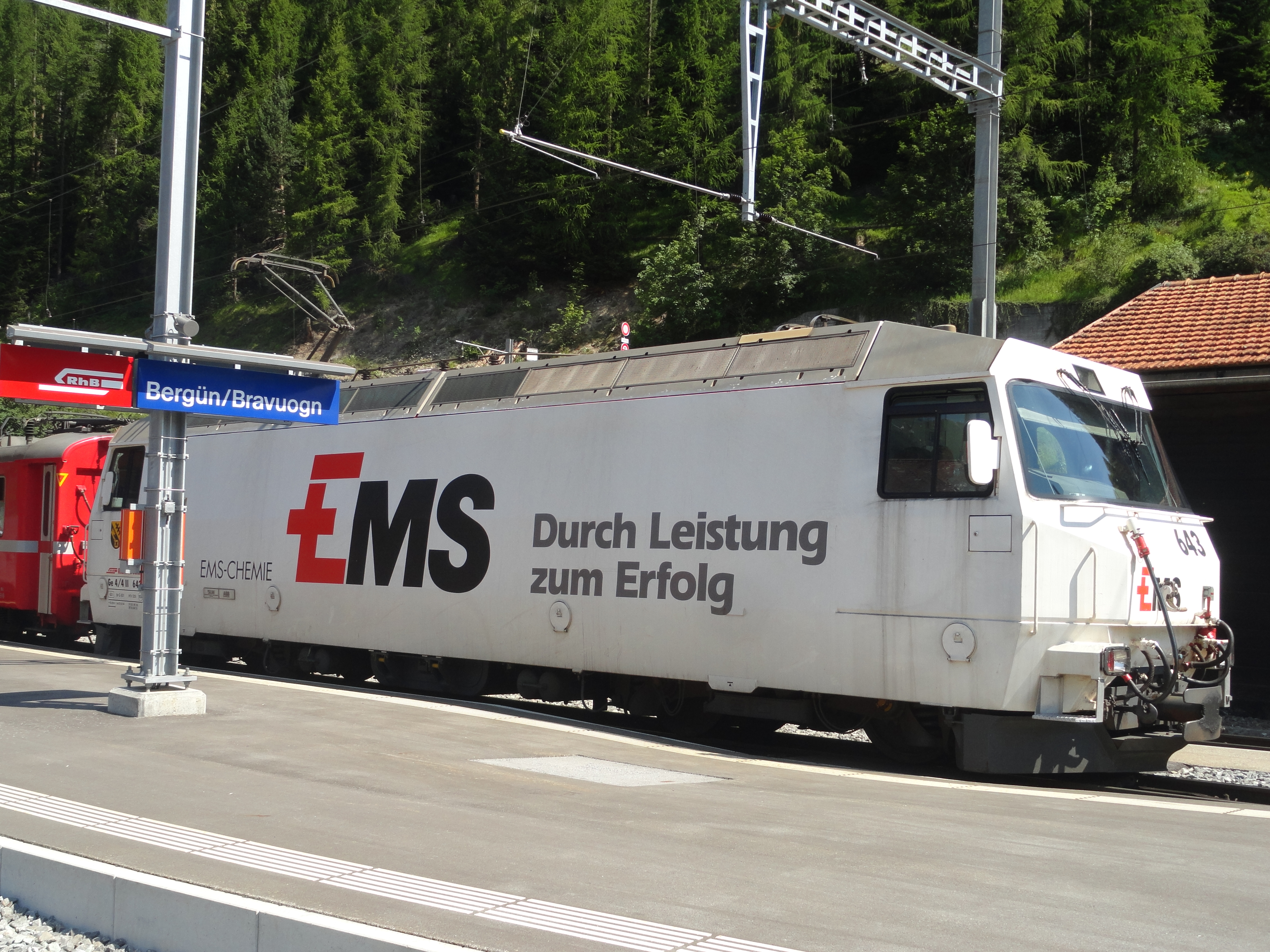
Rhaetian Railway: a locomotive of the Ge 4/4 III series advertises for Ems-Chemie.

In 2010 "Ems Eftec" sold the Aftermarket segment and focused on direct delivery. In 2011, EMS celebrated its 75-year company anniversary; on this occasion Karl Lüönd's released his company biography "Success as an order. «Ems-Chemie»: The History of an Impossible Company". At Domat / EMS, the highest fully automated high-bay warehouse in Switzerland was put into operation and EMS is selected by General Motors and Bosch as supplier of the year. Foxconn described EMS as the strategic supplier of the year.

=== International ===
Ems Chemie lets their apprentices learn in branches abroad. Ems Chemie has two factories in Russia that have 30 employees each. Due to the Russo-Ukrainian war, the production in the factories was halted.

== Transport infrastructure ==
Between Chur and Domat/Ems runs the narrow-gauge railway line Chur-Domat/Ems of the Rhaetian Railway, which has three tracks since December 1959. Through this, standard gauge freight trains can reach the Ems-Chemie. The RhB stop, Ems factory, serves the factory site directly. There are ideas to introduce normal passenger services to Ems factory in the future. For this purpose, however, the entire track system would have to be extended in three tracks to Ems factory. There is no proposed funding for this project.

== Awards ==
- 2012 and 2013 Supplier of the Year Award from General Motors.
- 2020 National Education Award of the Hans Huber Foundation and FH Switzerland Foundation.
