= 1992 in Switzerland =

- Decades: 1970s; 1980s; 1990s; 2000s; 2010s
- See also: History of Switzerland; Timeline of Swiss history; List of years in Switzerland

Events in the year 1992 in Switzerland.

== Incumbents ==
- Federal Council:
  - Otto Stich
  - Jean-Pascal Delamuraz
  - Kaspar Villiger
  - Arnold Koller
  - Flavio Cotti
  - René Felber (President)
  - Adolf Ogi

== Events ==
- 21–26 January – European Figure Skating Championships take place in Lausanne.
- Switzerland in the Eurovision Song Contest 1992.

== Births ==
- 7 January – Loris Benito, footballer
- 23 January – Joana Hählen, alpine skier
- 11 February
  - Priska Nufer, alpine skier
  - Anouk Vergé-Dépré, beach volleyball player
- 31 March – Henri Laaksonen, tennis player
- 21 April – Reto Schmidiger, alpine skier
- 3 May – Evelina Raselli, ice hockey player
- 20 May
  - Enes Kanter Freedom, Swiss-born Turkish basketball player
  - Fanny Smith, freestyle skier
- 1 July – Brandie Wilkerson, Swiss-born Canadian volleyball player
- 23 August – Nina Waidacher, ice hockey player
- 25 August
  - Sara Benz, ice hockey player
  - Laura Benz, ice hockey player
- 27 September – Granit Xhaka, footballer
- 16 October – Viktorija Golubic, tennis player
- 6 November – Simon Pellaud, cyclist
- 18 December – Sandra Thalmann, ice hockey player

== Deaths ==
- 8 April – Daniel Bovet. Swiss-born Italian pharmacologist (born 1907)
- 28 June – Peter Hirt, racing driver (born 1910)
- 20 August — Will Eisenmann, German-Swiss composer (born 1906 in Germany)
- 29 August – Heini Hediger. biologist (born 1908)
