= 1988 in Switzerland =

- Decades: 1960s; 1970s; 1980s; 1990s; 2000s
- See also: History of Switzerland; Timeline of Swiss history; List of years in Switzerland

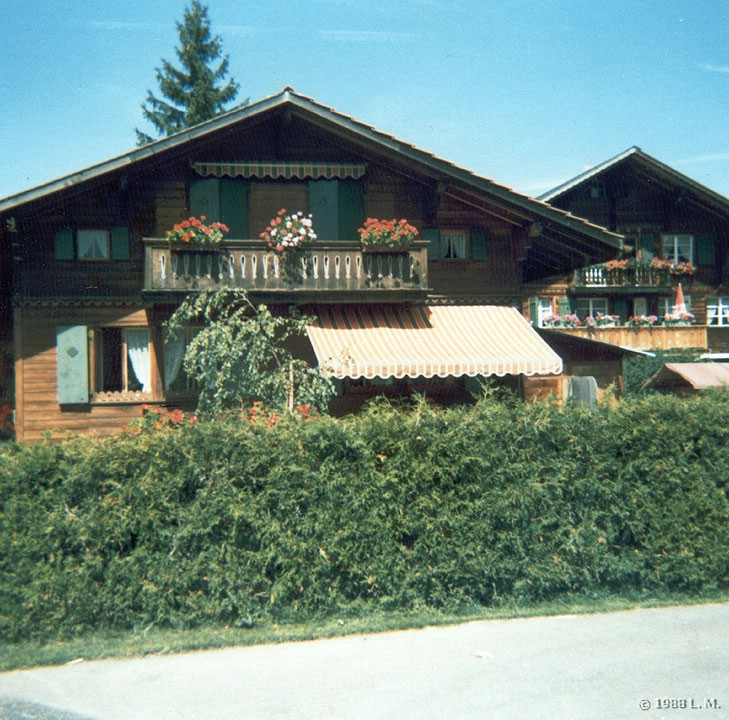
Gstaad, Switzerland, February 1988

Events in the year 1988 in Switzerland.

== Incumbents ==
- Federal Council:
  - Otto Stich (President)
  - Jean-Pascal Delamuraz
  - Elisabeth Kopp
  - Arnold Koller
  - Flavio Cotti
  - René Felber
  - Adolf Ogi

== Events ==
- 11–17 April – The 1988 Hexagon World Men's Curling Championship takes place in Lausanne.

== Births ==
- 8 February – Christian Schneuwly, footballer
- 18 February – Michael Siegfried, footballer
- 16 April
  - Julia Marty, ice hockey player
  - Stefanie Marty, ice hockey player
- 1 September – Simona de Silvestro, racing driver
- 27 September – Mathias Flückiger, mountain biker
- 30 November – Benjamin Lüthi, footballer

== Deaths ==
- 28 February – Hermann Burger, author and poet (born 1942)
- 9 May – Karl Brunner, economist (born 1916)
- 29 July – Georges Vuilleumier, footballer (born 1944)
- August – Albert Büchi, cyclist (born 1907)
- 16 September – Richard Paul Lohse, Swiss painter (born 1902)
- 5 November – Rudolf Wirz, handball player (born 1918)

Date unknown

- Benjamin Romieux, journalist (born 1914)
