= 1985 in Switzerland =

- Decades: 1960s; 1970s; 1980s; 1990s; 2000s
- See also: History of Switzerland; Timeline of Swiss history; List of years in Switzerland

Events in the year 1985 in Switzerland.

== Incumbents ==
- Federal Council:
  - Pierre Aubert (President)
  - Leon Schlumpf
  - Alphons Egli
  - Rudolf Friedrich
  - Otto Stich
  - Jean-Pascal Delamuraz (1983–1998)
  - Elisabeth Kopp (1984–1989)

== Events ==
- 19–20 November – Geneva Summit takes place.
- 10–14 December – The 1985 European Curling Championships take place in Grindelwald.

== Births ==
- 2 February – Julian Bühler, football striker
- 8 February – Sophie Lamon, fencer
- 4 June – Dominique Gisin, alpine skier

== Deaths ==
- 20 April – Rudolf Gnägi, politician (born 1917)
- 7 November – Friedrich Traugott Wahlen, politician (born 1899)
- 15 November – Méret Oppenheim, German-Swiss artist (born 1913 in Germany)
