= 1989 in Switzerland =

- Decades: 1960s; 1970s; 1980s; 1990s; 2000s
- See also: History of Switzerland; Timeline of Swiss history; List of years in Switzerland

Events in the year 1989 in Switzerland.

== Incumbents ==
- Federal Council:
  - Otto Stich
  - Jean-Pascal Delamuraz (President)
  - Elisabeth Kopp then Kaspar Villiger
  - Arnold Koller
  - Flavio Cotti
  - René Felber
  - Adolf Ogi

== Events ==
- 2–8 July – The 1989 World Archery Championships take place in Lausanne.
- 5–9 December – The 1989 European Curling Championships take place in Engelberg.

== Births ==
- 4 January – Kariem Hussein, 400 metres hurdler
- 9 March – Florence Schelling, ice hockey player
- 15 April – Denise Feierabend, alpine skier
- 24 May – Jessica Lutz, ice hockey player
- 8 June – Timea Bacsinszky, tennis player
- 13 June – Dino Wieser, ice hockey player
- 14 July – Dominique Rinderknecht, model, tv host and beauty pageant titleholder
- 28 August – Doris Schweizer, cyclist
- 1 September – Lucas Tramèr, rower
- 7 November – Tina Aeberli, footbag player

== Deaths ==
- 6 April – Michael Reusch, gymnast (born 1914)
- 20 June – Ernst Brugger, politician (born 1914)
- 12 November – Édouard Candeveau, rower (born 1898)
