= Carlton Hotel St. Moritz =

Hotel in Switzerland

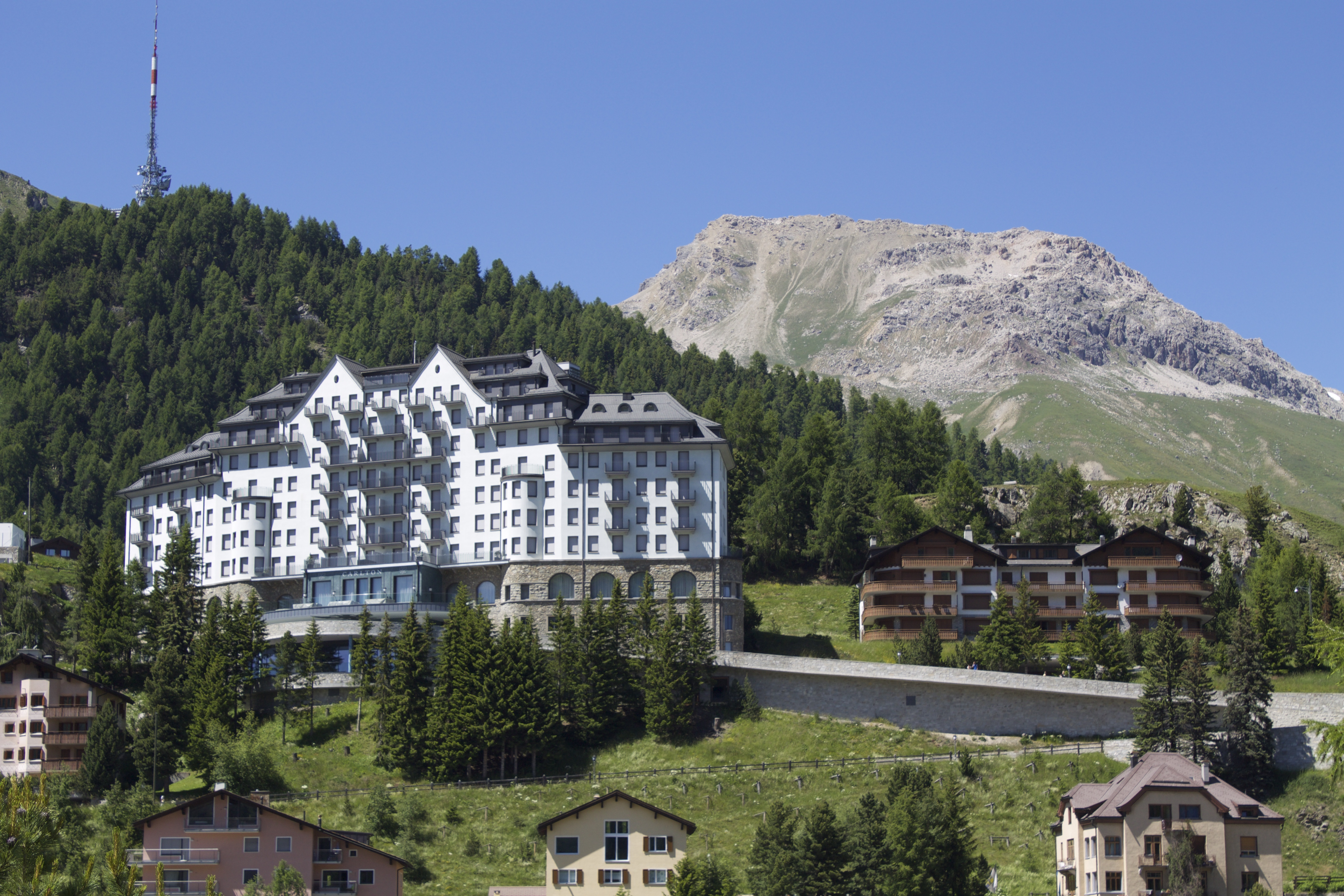
Carlton (2015)

The Carlton Hotel St. Moritz was opened in 1913. It was the fifth five-star hotel in St. Moritz.

In August 1914, World War I began. The guest numbers significantly declined. The hotel became the property of the Swiss People's Bank. In the 1930s, the hotel had many guests. On 1 September 1939, the Hitler regime began its Invasion of Poland, and the Carlton was closed the same month. In winter 1947/1948 the Carlton briefly reopened its doors.

Numerous changes of ownership followed until 1987, when the Carlton Hotel St. Moritz was taken over by the Tschuggen Hotel Group. The hotel was completely renovated in 2006–2007.

Aerial photo (1919)

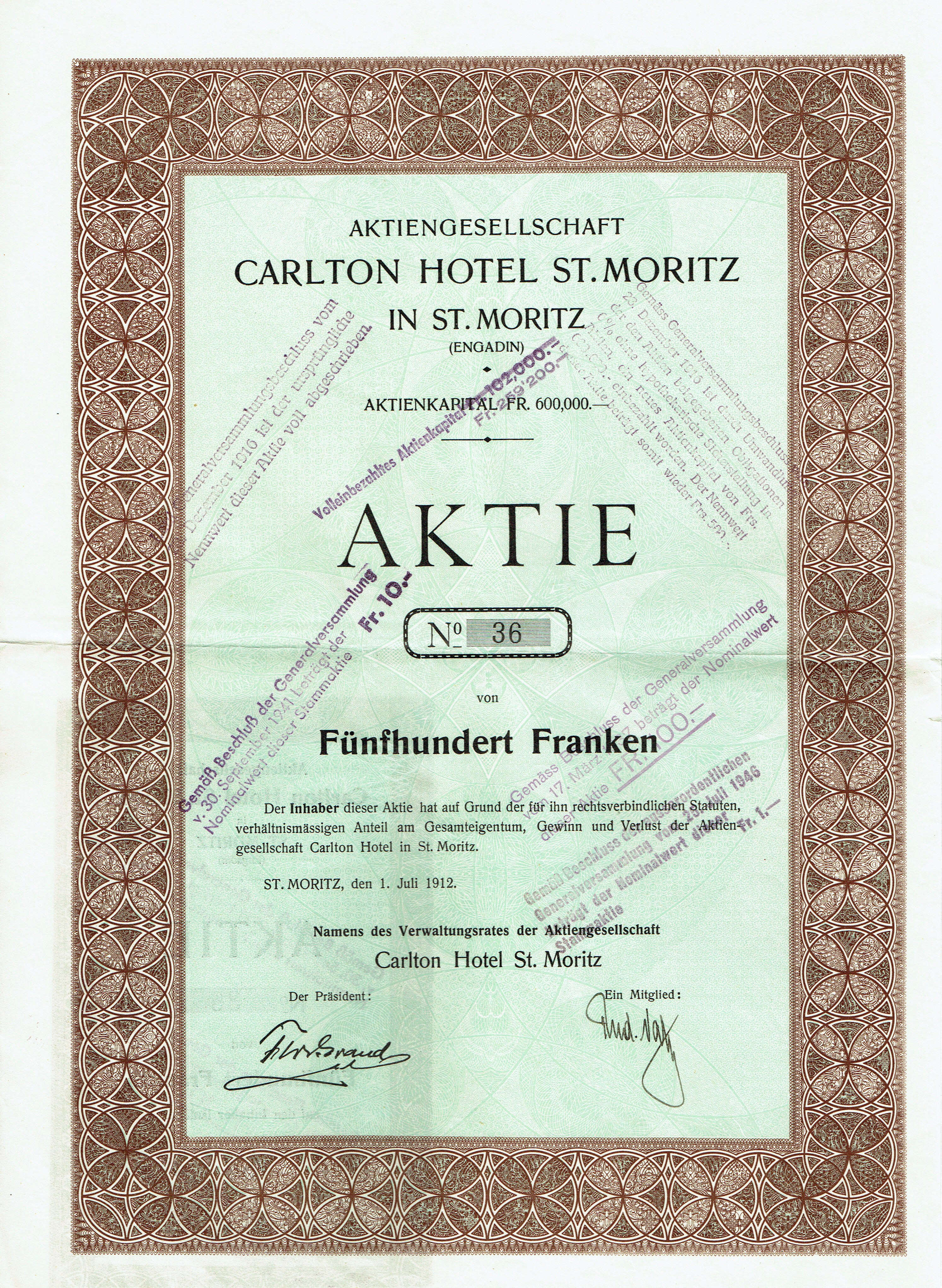
share AG Carlton Hotel St. Moritz (July 1912)

== See also ==
- History of Alpinism
