= 1987 in Switzerland =

- Decades: 1960s; 1970s; 1980s; 1990s; 2000s
- See also: History of Switzerland; Timeline of Swiss history; List of years in Switzerland

Events in the year 1987 in Switzerland.

== Incumbents ==
- Federal Council:
  - Pierre Aubert (President)
  - Leon Schlumpf
  - Otto Stich
  - Jean-Pascal Delamuraz
  - Elisabeth Kopp
  - Arnold Koller
  - Flavio Cotti

== Births ==
- 21 June – Sabrina Jaquet, badminton player
- 7 April – Marco Mangold, footballer
- 5 June – Angela Frautschi, ice hockey player
- 18 July – Nicole Bullo, ice hockey player
- 22 September - Michèle Jäggi, curler
- 11 October – Ariella Käslin, artistic gymnast
- 16 October – Patrizia Kummer, snowboarder

== Deaths ==
- 16 March – Raymond Passello, footballer (born 1905)
- 15 October – August Erne, cyclist (born 1905)
