= Romieu =

Romieu or Romieux may refer to

- Benjamin Romieux (1914–1988), a Swiss journalist
- Benjamin Romieux, a sixteenth-century French poet
- a Quebec township named Romieu
- the grape more commonly known as malbec
- the commune of La Romieu in south-west France
