= 1986 in Switzerland =

- Decades: 1960s; 1970s; 1980s; 1990s; 2000s
- See also: History of Switzerland; Timeline of Swiss history; List of years in Switzerland

Events in the year 1986 in Switzerland.

== Incumbents ==
- Federal Council:
  - Alphons Egli (president, resigned December)
  - Pierre Aubert
  - Leon Schlumpf
  - Otto Stich
  - Jean-Pascal Delamuraz
  - Elisabeth Kopp
  - Kurt Furgler (resigned December)
  - Flavio Cotti (from December)
  - Arnold Koller (from December)

== Births ==
- 3 April – Katrin Nabholz, ice hockey player
- 13 May – Nino Schurter, cross-country cyclist
- 24 May – Christine Meier, ice hockey player
