= 1990 in Switzerland =

- Decades: 1970s; 1980s; 1990s; 2000s; 2010s
- See also: History of Switzerland; Timeline of Swiss history; List of years in Switzerland

Events in the year 1990 in Switzerland.

== Incumbents ==
- Federal Council:
  - Otto Stich
  - Jean-Pascal Delamuraz
  - Kaspar Villiger
  - Arnold Koller (President)
  - Flavio Cotti
  - René Felber
  - Adolf Ogi

== Events ==
- 1 April – Six referendums are done, the subjects being four popular initiatives, a federal resolution on viticulture and an amendment to the federal law on the organisation of the federal judiciary. All six are rejected by voters.
- 23 September – A further four referendums are held, on two popular initiatives to phase out nuclear power and to stop the construction of any new nuclear power plants, as well as on a federal resolution on the energy article in the Swiss Federal Constitution and an amendment to the federal law on road traffic. The nuclear power phase-out was rejected, but the other three proposals were approved.

== Births ==
- 30 January – Luca Sbisa, ice hockey player
- 5 March – Léa Sprunger, track and field athlete
- 8 March – Alina Pätz, curler
- 1 May – Patrick Schelling, cyclist
- 22 June – Mario Dolder, biathlete
- 21 July – Whitney Toyloy, Swiss model, Miss Switzerland 2008
- 9 August – Anja Stiefel, ice hockey player
- 26 August – Marcel Aregger, cyclist
- 1 September – Mélanie René, singer and songwriter
- 5 October – Andreas Wittwer, footballer
- 2 December – Simon Schürch, rower

== Deaths ==
- 31 May – Willy Spühler, politician (born 1902)
- 27 August – Armin Scheurer, athlete (born 1917)
- 21 November – Pierre Musy, bobsledder and horse rider (born 1910)
- 26 November – Ludwig von Moos, politician (born 1910)
- 30 December – Herman Volz, painter and designer (born 1904)
