= 1910 in Switzerland =

- Decades: 1890s; 1900s; 1910s; 1920s; 1930s
- See also: History of Switzerland; Timeline of Swiss history; List of years in Switzerland

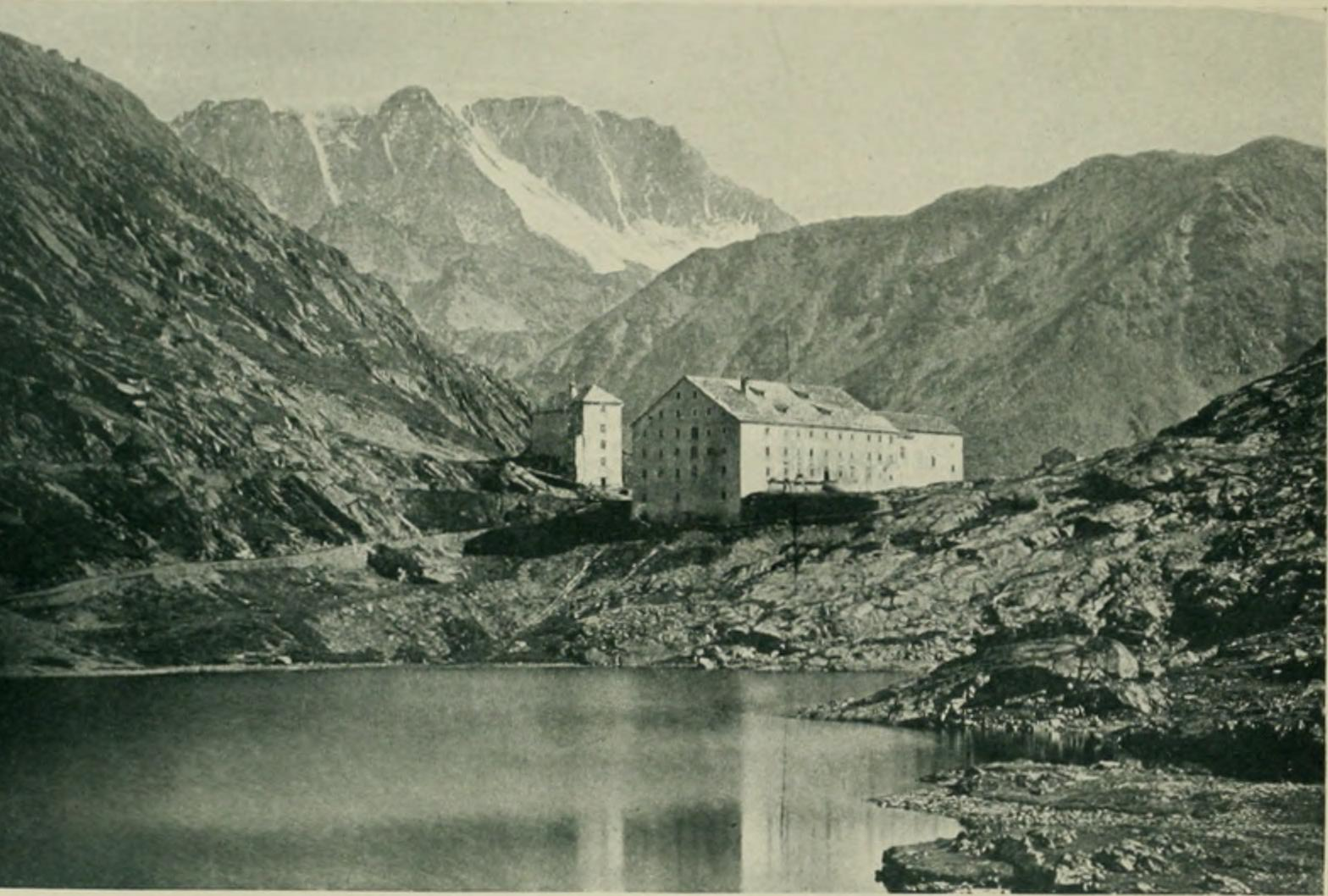
Locality in Switzerland c.1910

Events during the year 1910 in Switzerland.

== Incumbents ==
- Federal Council:
  - Robert Comtesse (president)
  - Eduard Müller
  - Adolf Deucher
  - Ernst Brenner
  - Marc-Emile Ruchet
  - Ludwig Forrer
  - Josef Anton Schobinger

== Births ==
- 31 January – Ludwig von Moos, politician (died 1990)
- 28 March – Lucian Büeler, figure skater (died 1952)
- 19 December – Hermann Betschart, rower (died 1950)

== Deaths ==
- 16 July – Albert Anker, painter (born 1831)
- 30 October – Henry Dunant, humanitarian and businessman, co-founder of the Red Cross (born 1828)
