= 1908 in Switzerland =

- Decades: 1880s; 1890s; 1900s; 1910s; 1920s
- See also: History of Switzerland; Timeline of Swiss history; List of years in Switzerland

Events during the year 1908 in Switzerland.

== Incumbents ==
- Federal Council:
  - Ernst Brenner (president)
  - Robert Comtesse
  - Eduard Müller
  - Adolf Deucher
  - Marc-Emile Ruchet
  - Ludwig Forrer
  - Joseph Zemp (until June), then Josef Anton Schobinger

== Births ==
- 23 May – Annemarie Schwarzenbach, author and photographer (died 1942)
- 6 December – Pierre Graber, politician (died 2003)
- 16 December – Hans Schaffner, politician (died 2004)
- 22 December – Max Bill, architect and artist (died 1994 in Germany)
