= Michael Siegfried =

Swiss footballer (born 1988)

Personal information
- Full name: Michael Siegfried
- Date of birth: 18 February 1988 (age 38)
- Place of birth: Thun, Switzerland
- Height: 1.88 m (6 ft 2 in)
- Position: Defensive midfielder

Youth career
- FC Thun

Senior career*
Years	Team	Apps	(Gls)
2011–2016	FC Thun	83	(5)
2010–2011	→ FC Breitenrain Bern (loan)	27	(2)
2012–2013	→ FC Biel-Bienne (loan)	7	(0)
2017–2018	FC Aarau	7	(0)
2018	→ FC United Zürich (loan)	13	(1)
2018–2019	FC Münsingen	10	(0)
- * Club domestic league appearances and goals

Michael Siegfried (born 18 February 1988) is a retired Swiss professional footballer who played as a defensive midfielder.

== Career ==
Siegfried made his debut for Thun on 24 July 2011 in a 3–0 victory against Grasshopper Club Zürich.
