= Tina Aeberli =

Swiss footbag player (born 1989)

Tina Aeberli (born 1989 in Zurich) is a Footbag player from Switzerland.

== Career ==
Tina Aeberli is the most successful female footbag player so far. The student of human medicine discovered the footbag game for herself at the age of 13 in a sports holiday camp in Switzerland. One year later in 2004 she became 4th at her very first Swiss Championship. Since 2005 Aeberli has practically been unbeaten in the ladies' tournament and has achieved more than 35 single titles; she has also been eight times European Champion and six times World Champion. Because of her great technical superiority she is increasingly participating at the men's events. Since 2006, she is a member of the Big Add Posse. The Big ADD Posse (BAP) are a group of skilled freestyle footbag players who have contributed to the progression of the sport in a unique way. The group is invite-only, and the only way to get an invitation is to shred hard in front of other members and prove your style.

== Titles ==
Swiss Champion (only main discipline): 1. Place Routines (2005, 2006, 2007, 2008, 2009, 2010, 2011, 2012)

European Champion (only main discipline): 1. Place Routines (2005, 2006, 2007, 2008, 2009, 2010, 2011, 2012)

World Champion (only main discipline): 1. Place Routines (2006, 2007, 2008, 2009, 2010, 2012) 1. Place Women’s Doubles with Lena Scheiwiller (2005, 2006)
