= Marco Mangold =

Swiss footballer (born 1987)

Personal information
- Full name: Marco Mangold
- Date of birth: 7 April 1987 (age 39)
- Height: 1.86 m (6 ft 1 in)
- Position: Midfielder

Team information
- Current team: Zug 94

Youth career
- SC Kriens

Senior career*
Years	Team	Apps	(Gls)
2005–2007	SC Kriens	22	(3)
2007–2010	FC Zürich II	55	(20)
2009–2010	→ SC Kriens (loan)	21	(1)
2010–2014	FC Schaffhausen	111	(16)
2014–2015	FC Thun	5	(0)
2015–2017	FC Winterthur	33	(2)
2017–2018	SC Kriens	2	(0)
2019–	Zug 94	?	(?)
- * Club domestic league appearances and goals as of 26 January 2019

Marco Mangold (born 7 April 1987) is a Swiss football midfielder who currently plays for Zug 94.

== Career ==
In July 2014, he joined FC Thun from FC Schaffhausen.
