= Albert Anker =

Swiss painter and illustrator

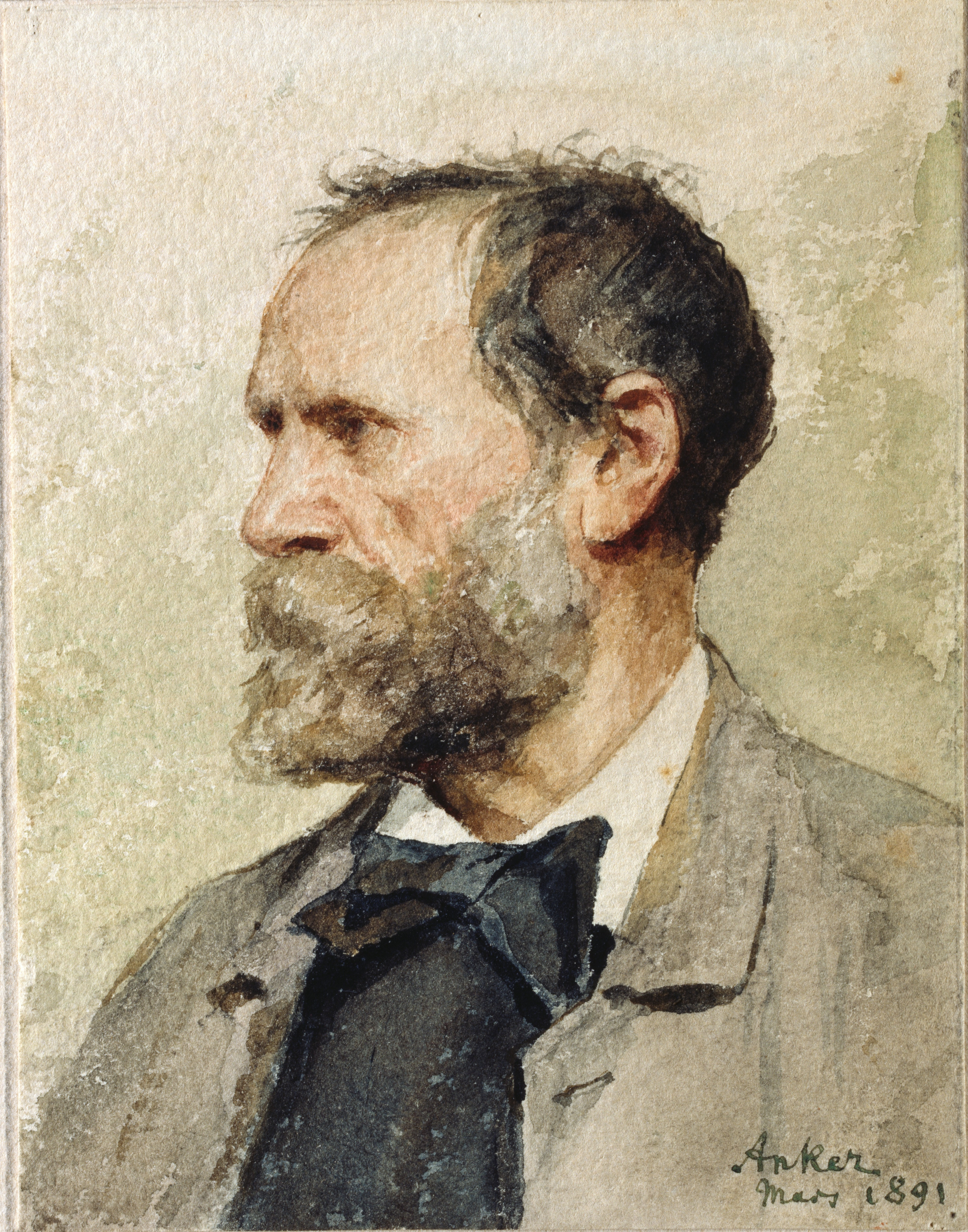
- Self-portrait in profile, left (1891); Watercolours, 16.3 × 12.7 cm
- Born: Samuel Albrecht Anker; 1 April 1831; Ins, Switzerland
- Died: 16 July 1910 (aged 79); Ins, Switzerland
- Occupation: Painter
- Spouse: Anna Rüfli (m. 1864)
- Children: 6
- Parent(s): Samuel Anker; Marianne Anker

Albert Anker (1 April 1831 – 16 July 1910) was a Swiss painter and illustrator who has been called the "national painter" of Switzerland because of his enduringly popular depictions of 19th-century Swiss rural life.

== Life ==
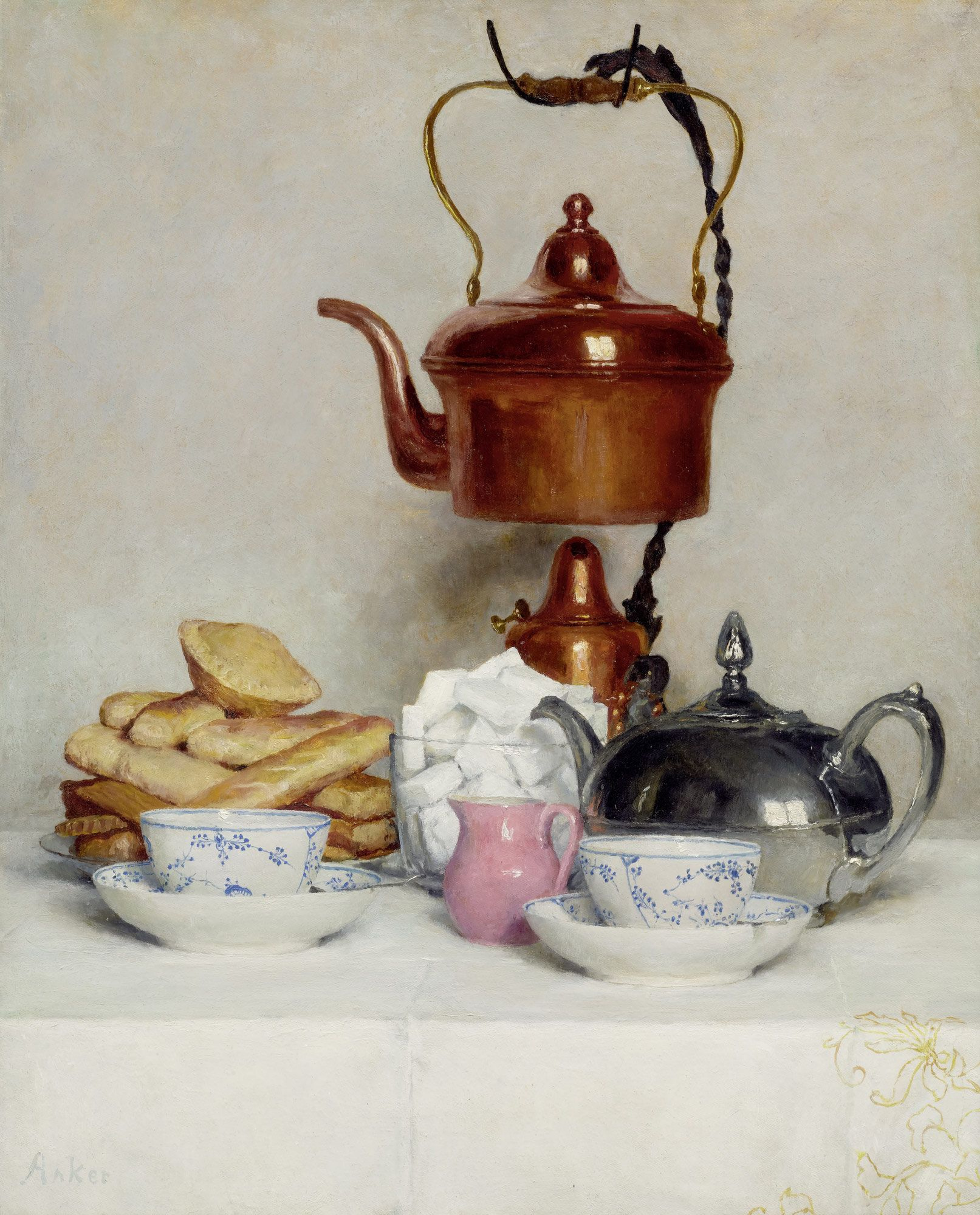
Albert Anker, Still life Tea service

Born in Ins as the son of veterinarian Samuel Anker (then a member of the constituent assembly of the Canton of Bern) and Marianne Elisabeth (born Gatschet). In 1836, his father became veterinarian in Neuchâtel, and the Anker family moved there. Anker attended school in Neuchâtel, where his teacher in sketching was Frédéric-Wilhelm Moritz. He and Auguste Bachelin, later a fellow artist, took private drawing lessons with Louis Wallinger from 1845 to 1848. In 1849, he enrolled into a Gymnasium in Bern, graduating with the Matura in 1851. Afterwards, he studied theology, beginning in 1851 at the University of Bern and continuing at the University of Halle, Germany. But in Germany he was inspired by the great art collections, and in 1854, he convinced his father to agree to an artistic career. In Neuchâtel he began using the name Albert, because it was easier to pronounce for his French-speaking classmates.

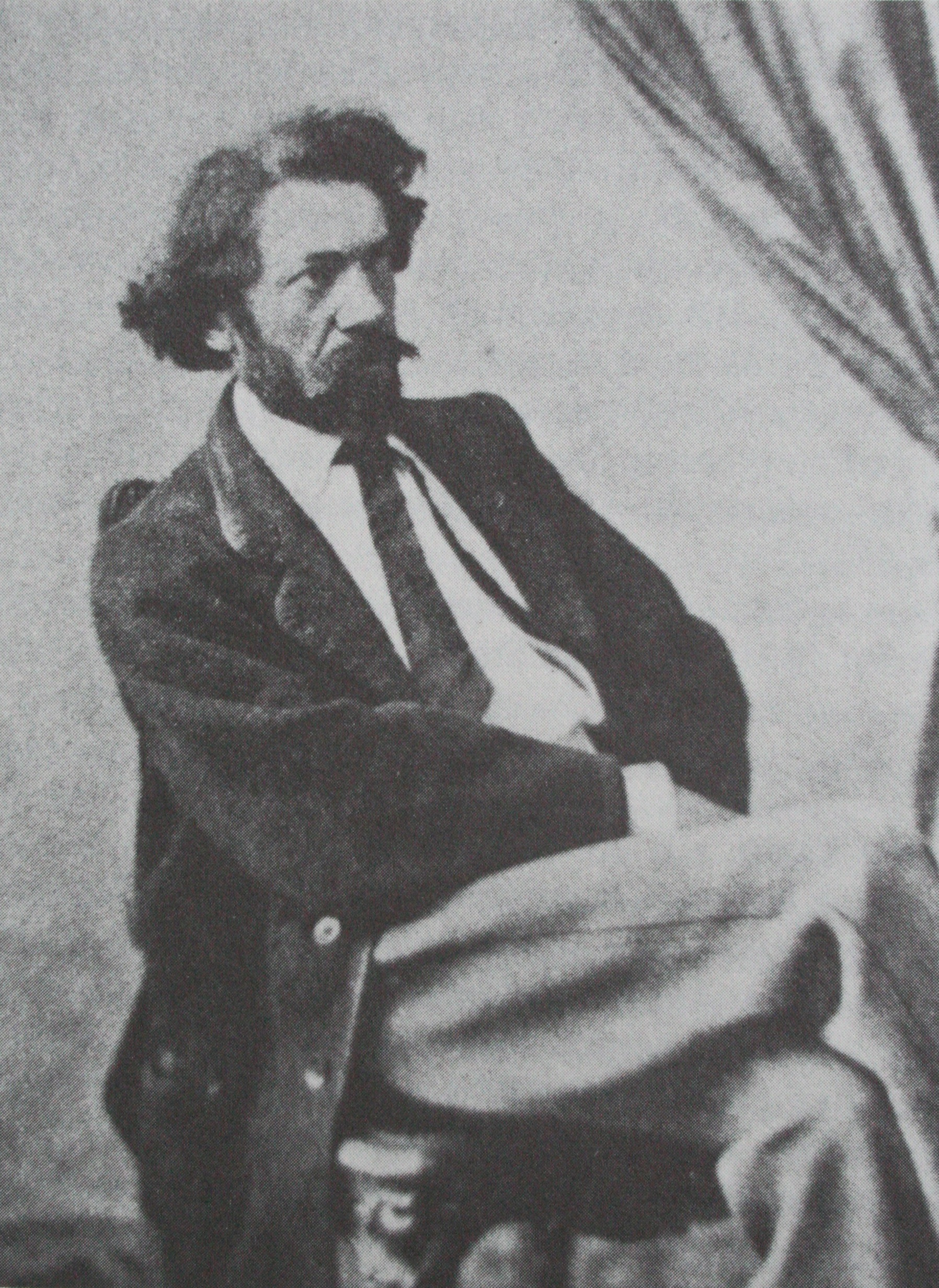
Anker in Paris (1855)

Anker moved to Paris, where he studied with Charles Gleyre and attended the École nationale supérieure des Beaux-Arts in 1855–60. He installed a studio in the attic of his parents' house and participated regularly in exhibitions in Switzerland and in Paris. Anker married Anna Rüfli in 1864, and they had six children together; the four children who did not die at an early age – Louise, Marie, Maurice and Cécile – appear in some of Anker's paintings. In 1866, he was awarded a gold medal at the Paris Salon for Schlafendes Mädchen im Walde (1865) und Schreibunterricht (1865); in 1878 he was made a knight of the Légion d'honneur. In 1870–74 he was a member of the Grand Council of Bern, where he advocated the construction of the Kunstmuseum Bern.

Apart from his regular wintertime stays in Paris, Anker frequently travelled to Italy and other European countries. In 1889–93 and 1895–98 he was a member of the Swiss Federal Art Commission and in 1900 he received an honorary doctorate from the University of Bern. A stroke in 1901 reduced his ability to work. Only after his death in 1910 was there a first exposition dedicated to him, held at the Musée d'art et d'histoire in Neuchâtel.

== Works ==
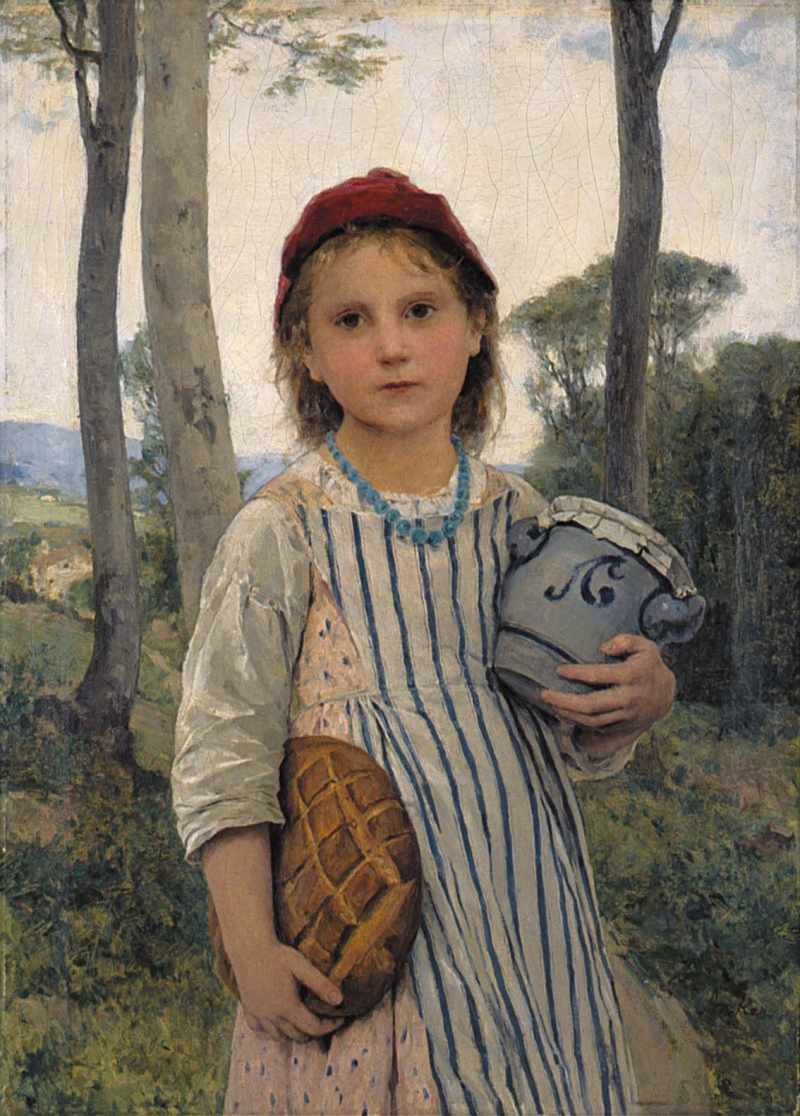
Le petit chaperon rouge, (Little Red Riding Hood), 1883

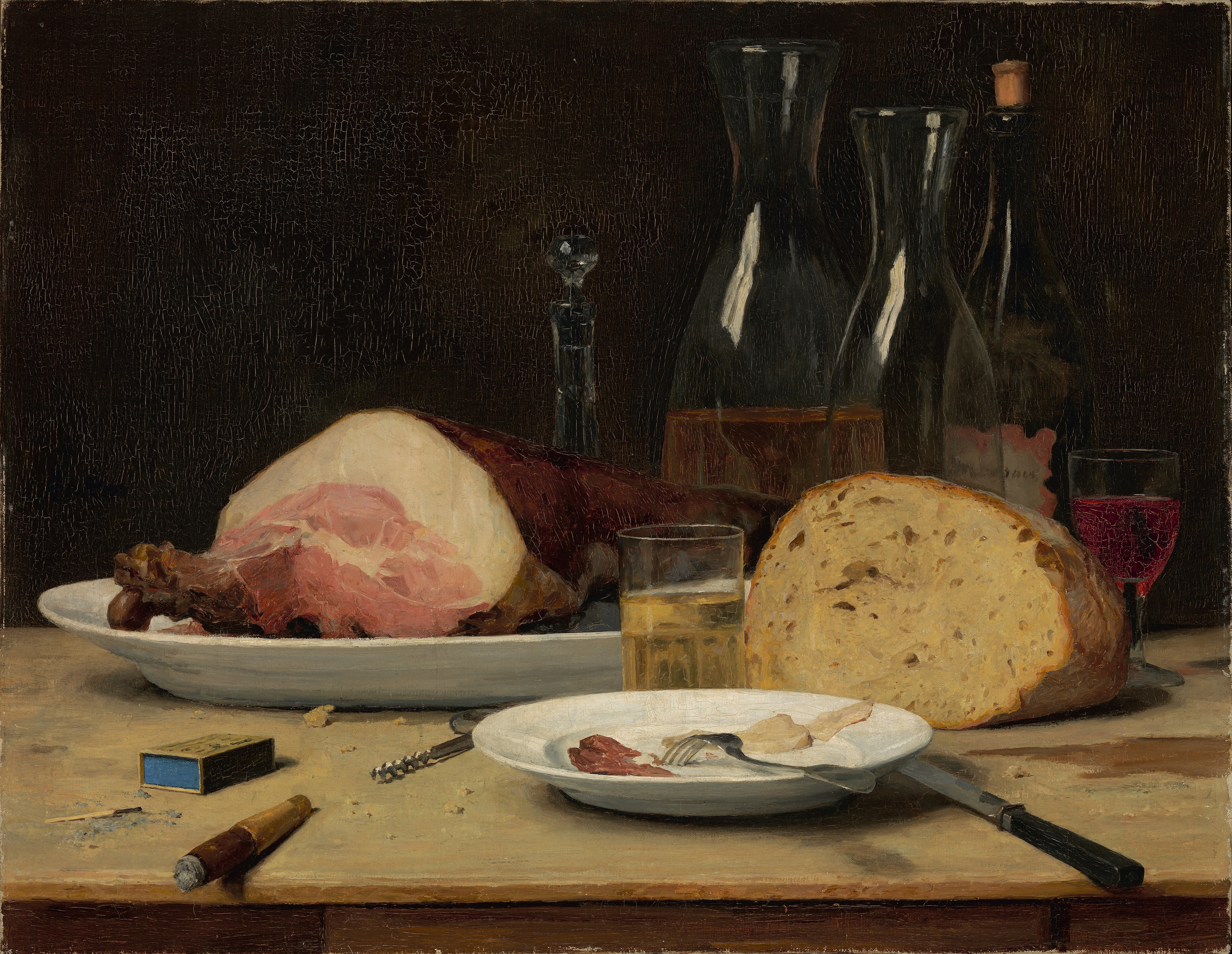
The exactingly painted Still Life: Excess (1896) depicts the remnants of a large meal

During his studies, Anker produced a series of works with historical and biblical themes, including paintings of Luther and Calvin. Soon after returning to Ins, though, he turned to what would become his signature theme: the everyday life of people in rural communities. His paintings depict his fellow citizens in an unpretentious and plain manner, without idealising country life, but also without the critical examination of social conditions that can be found in the works of contemporaries such as Daumier, Courbet or Millet. Although Anker did paint occasional scenes with a social significance, such as visits by usurers or charlatans to the village, his affirmative and idealistic Christian world-view did not include an inclination to issue any sort of overt challenge.

Also prominent in Anker's work are the more than 30 still lifes he created. They depict both rural and urban table settings in the tradition of Chardin, their realist solidity reflecting Anker's vision of a harmonic and stable world order. In addition, Anker created hundreds of commissioned watercolours and drawings, mostly portraits and illustrations, including for an edition of Jeremias Gotthelf's collected works. Between 1866, the year Anker settled to Paris and 1892, Anker also decorated more than 500 faience plates for the Alsatian pottery industrial Théodore Deck.

Anker developed a consistent artistic style that he maintained throughout his career. His works reflect themes of everyday Swiss life and have been associated with a sense of calm and an affinity for Swiss democracy, with attention to colouring and lighting noted as characteristic features of his technique. While his subjects are largely parochial, his correspondence suggests an engagement with contemporary European art and events beyond his immediate surroundings.

== Reception ==
Albert Anker's work made him Switzerland's most popular genre painter of the 19th century, and his paintings have continued to enjoy a great popularity due to their general accessibility. Indeed, as a student, Anker summed up his approach to art as follows: "One has to shape an idea in one's imagination, and then one has to make that idea accessible to the people."

Many Swiss postage stamps and other media have incorporated Anker's work. His studio in Ins has been preserved as a museum by the Albert Anker Foundation. One of Anker's greatest admirers and collectors is former Swiss Federal Councillor Christoph Blocher, since the 1980s Switzerland's most influential conservative politician, who also published an apologetic essay on Anker.

== Personal life ==
His brother Rudolf and his mother both died in 1847, when Anker was in Neuchâtel. His younger sister Louise died in 1852.

== Gallery ==
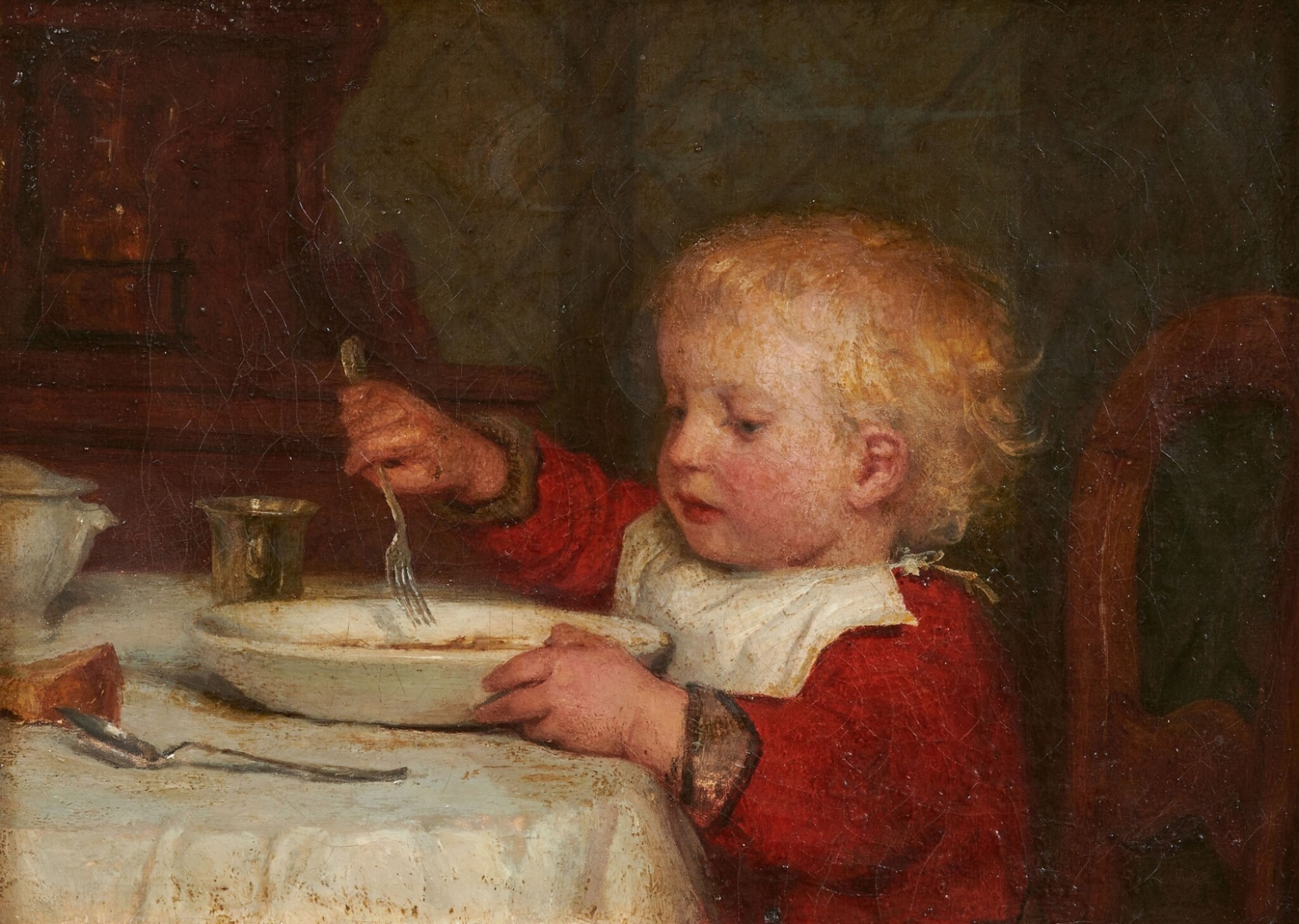
Boy at Table (Ruedi Anker) by Albert Anker, 1869

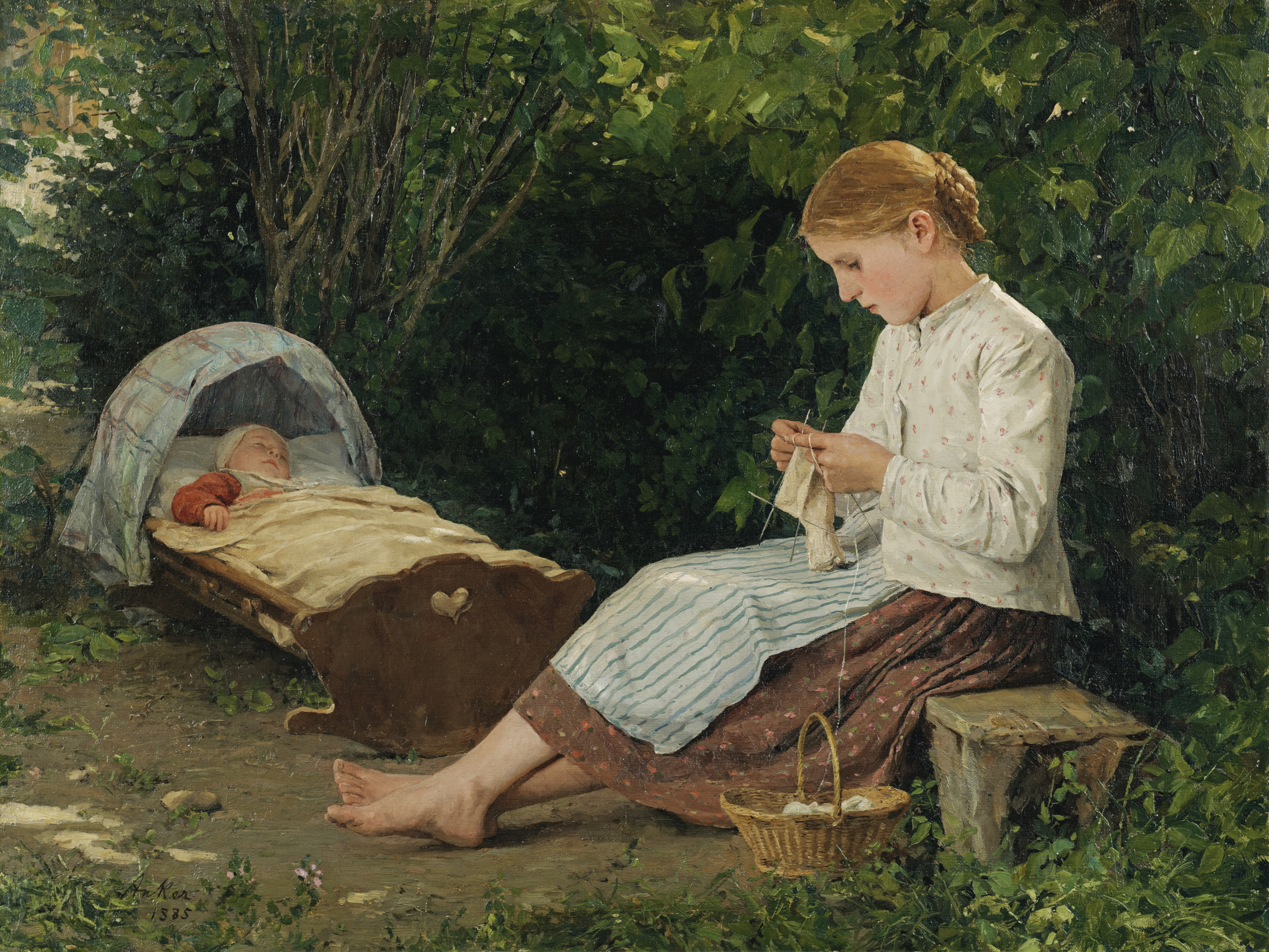
Strickendes Mädchen, Kleinkind in der Wiege hütend, 1884

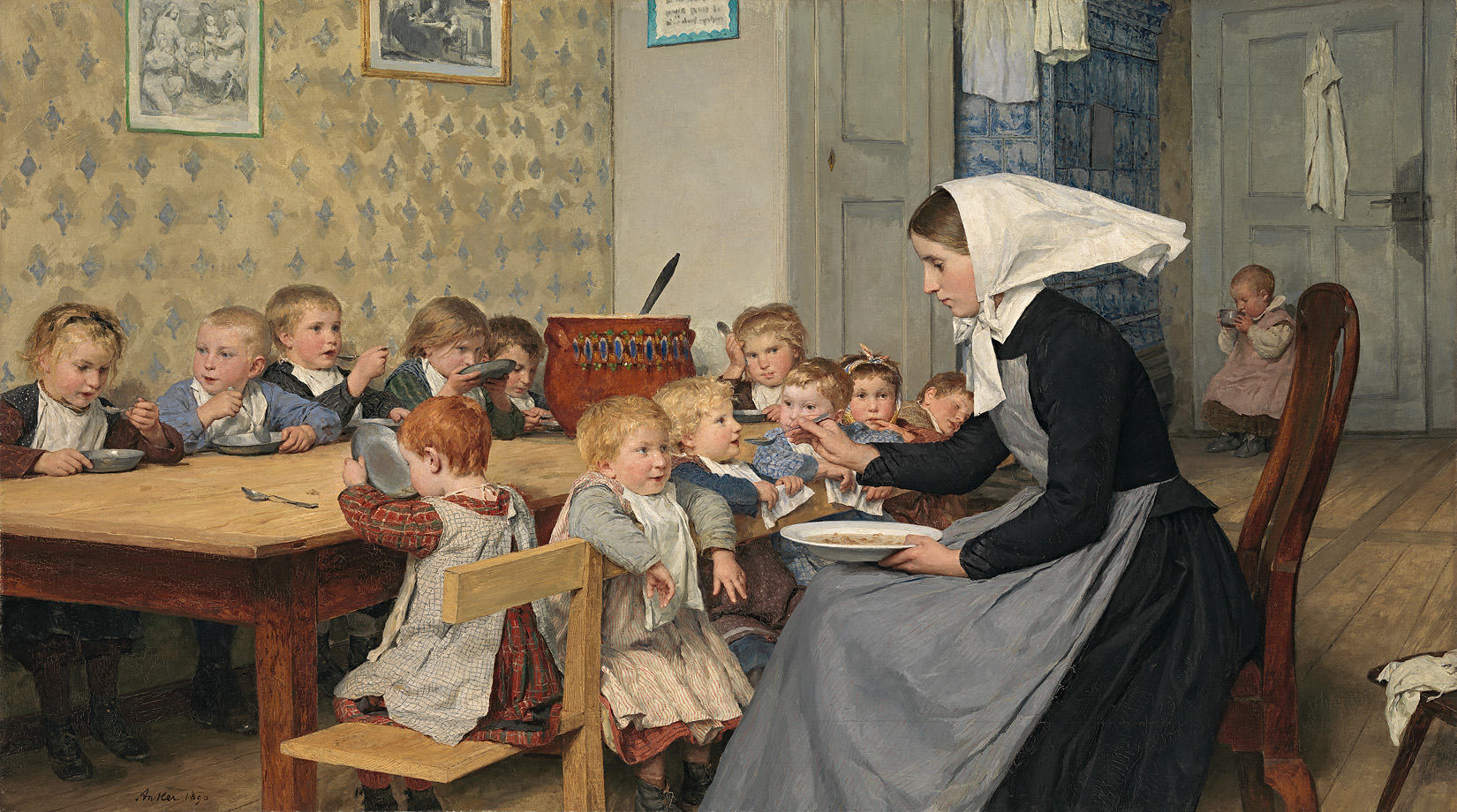
Die Kinderkrippe, 1890

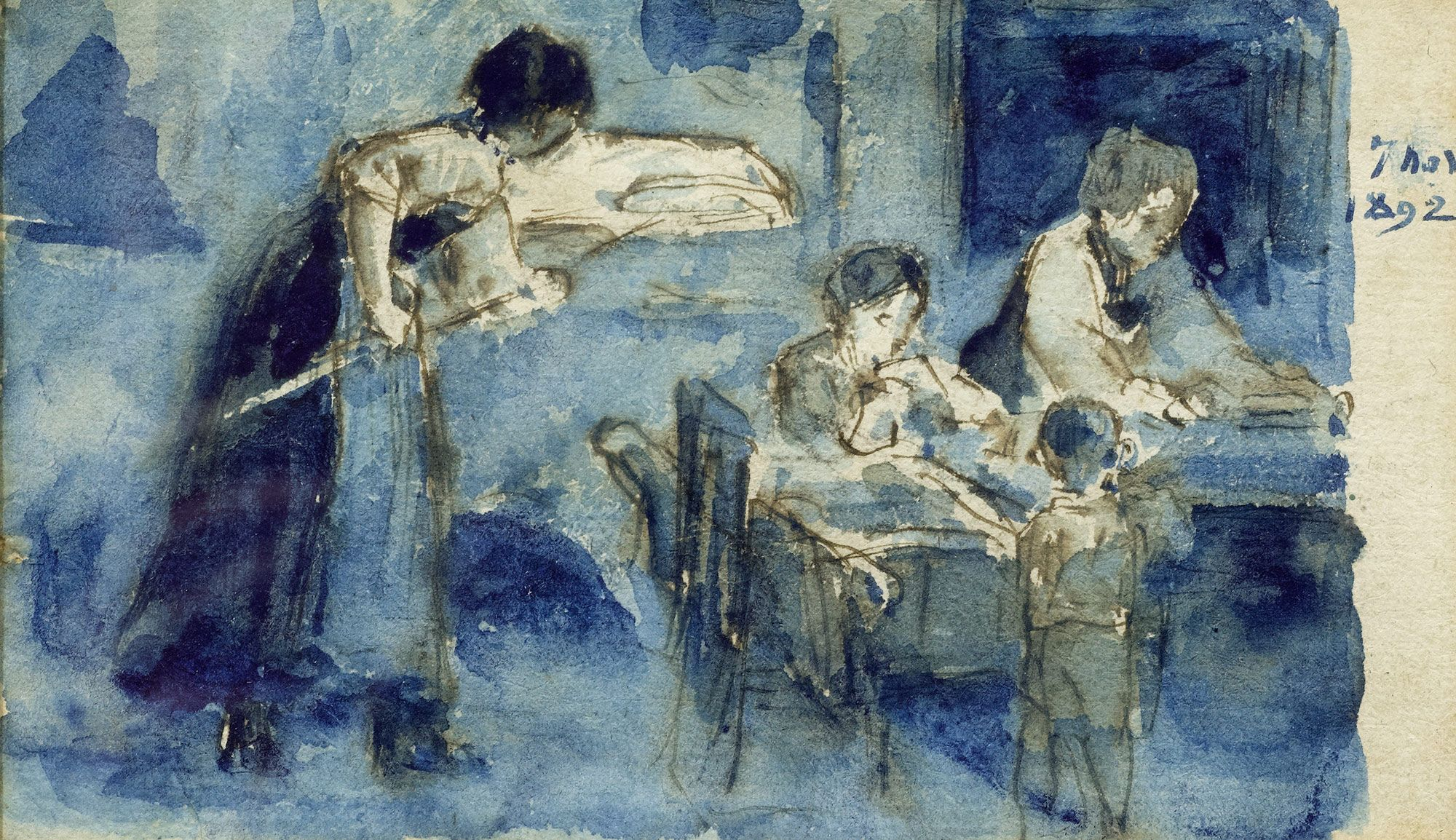
Küchenszene. 1892.

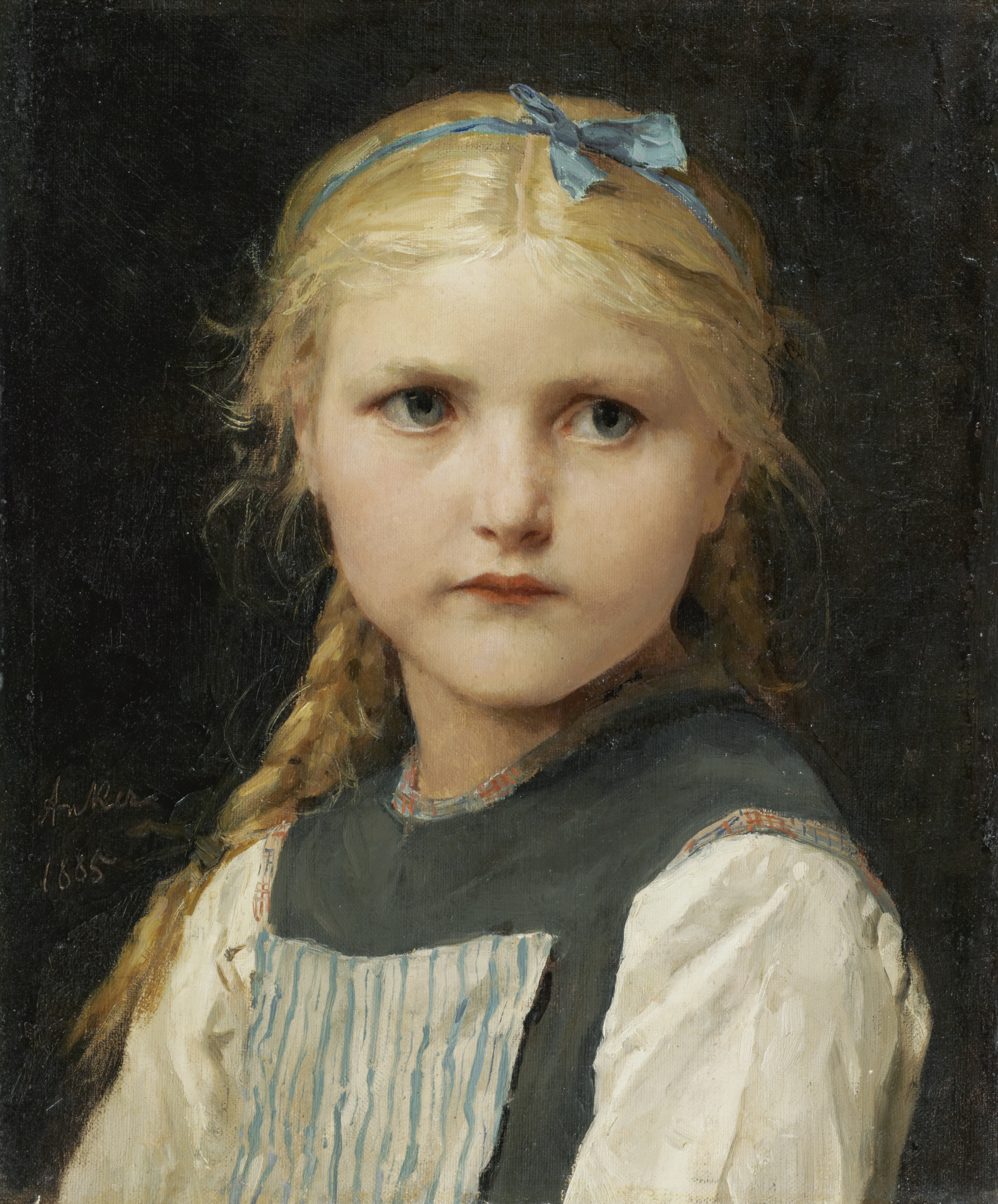
(1885)

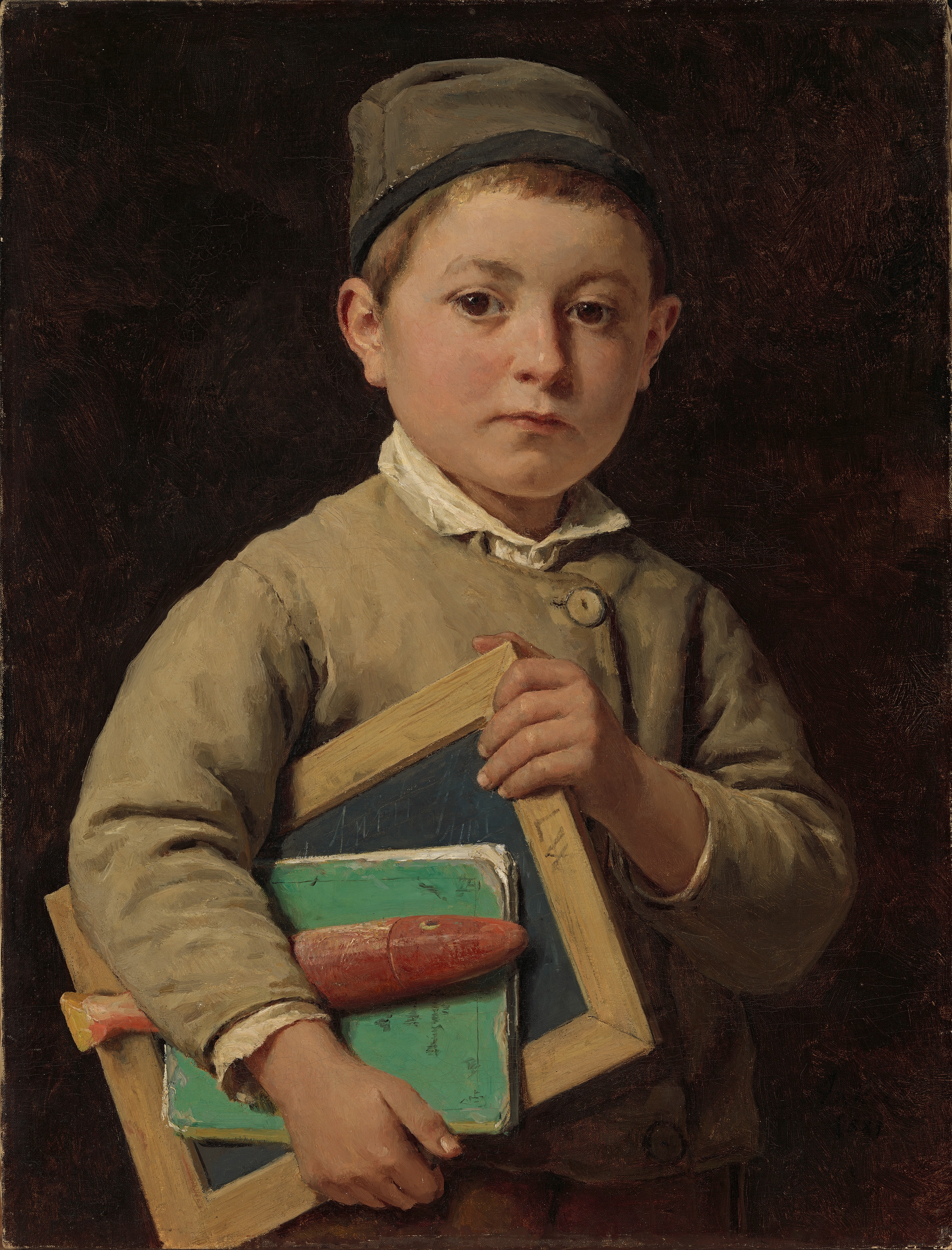
1881

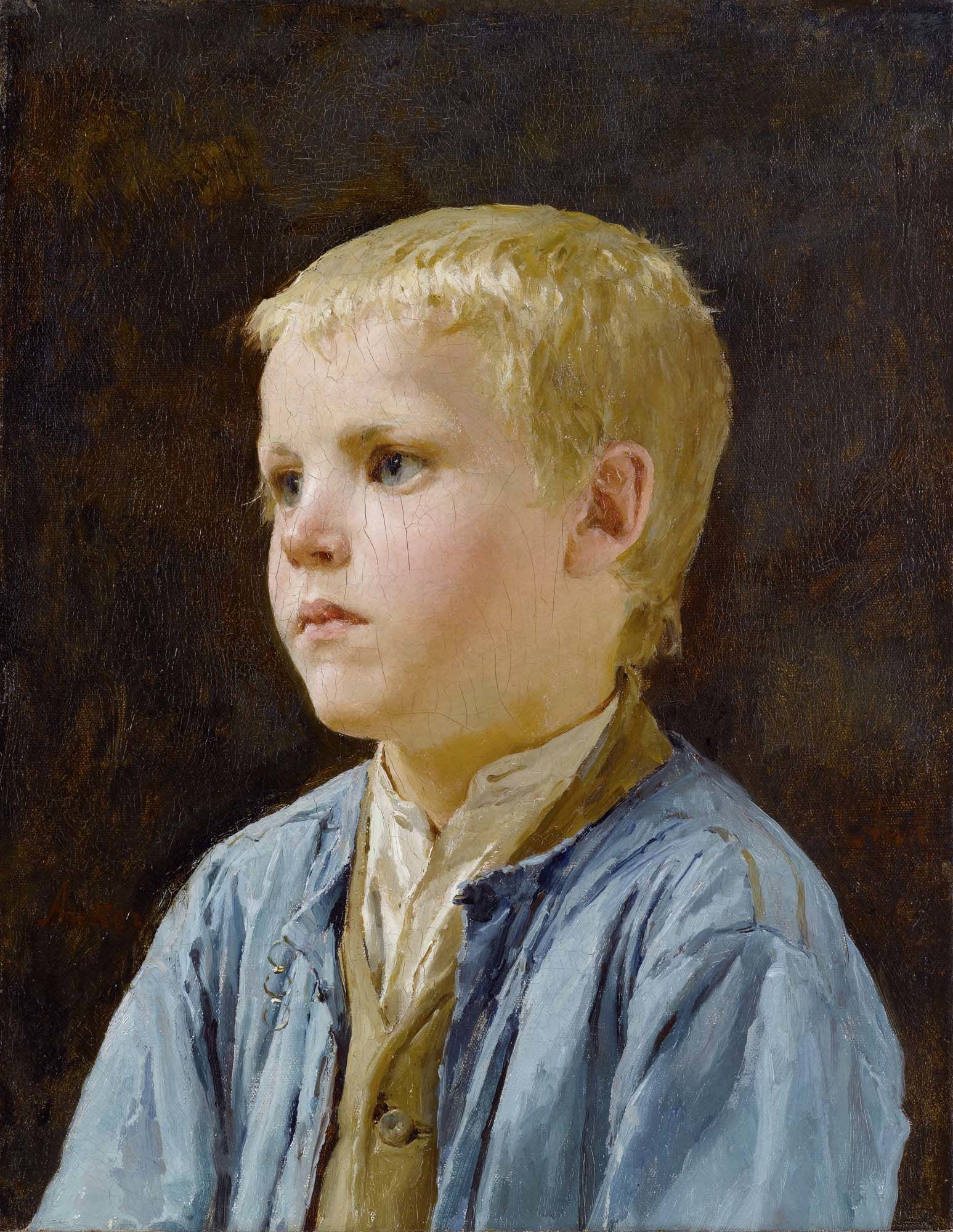

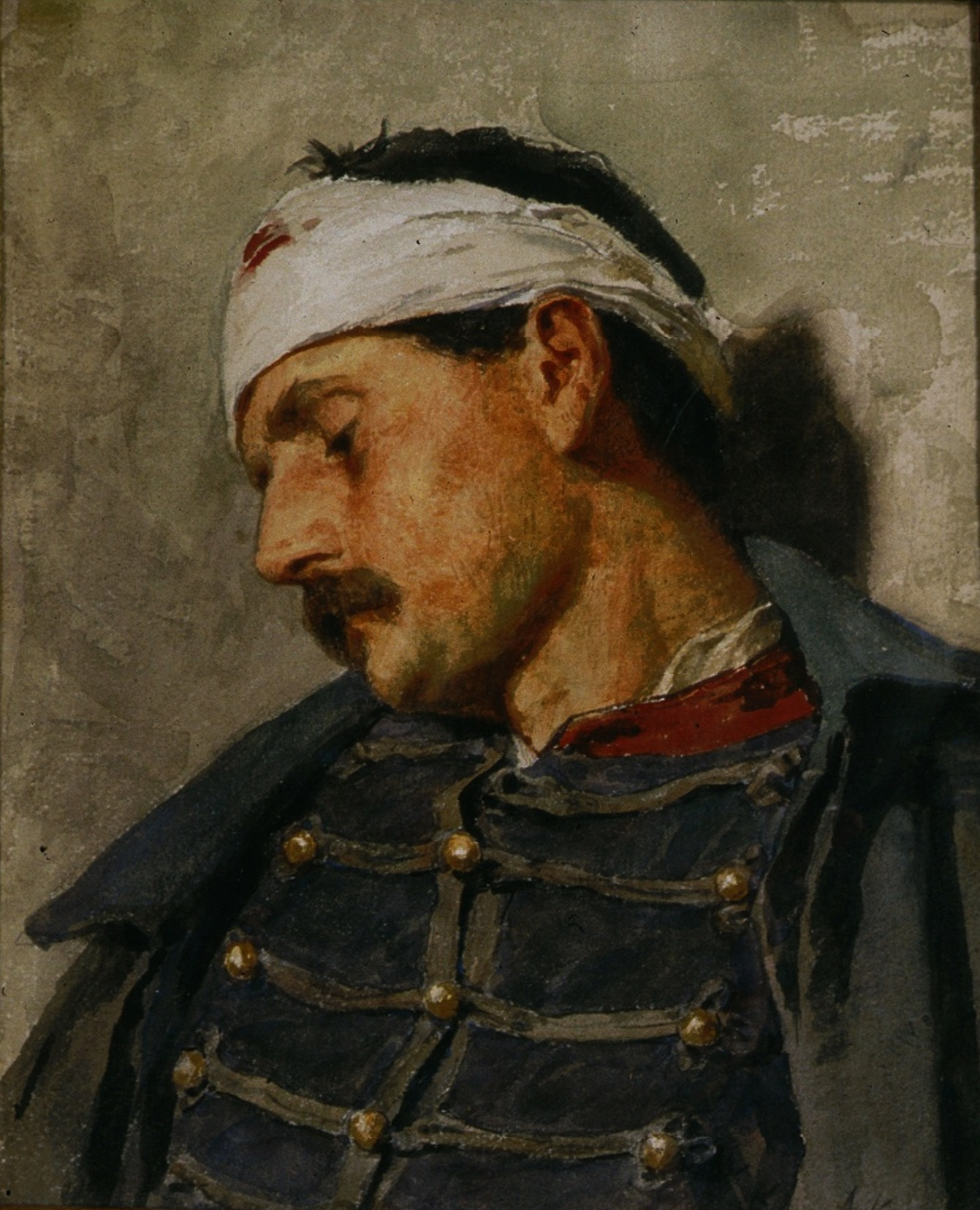
Probably 1870s

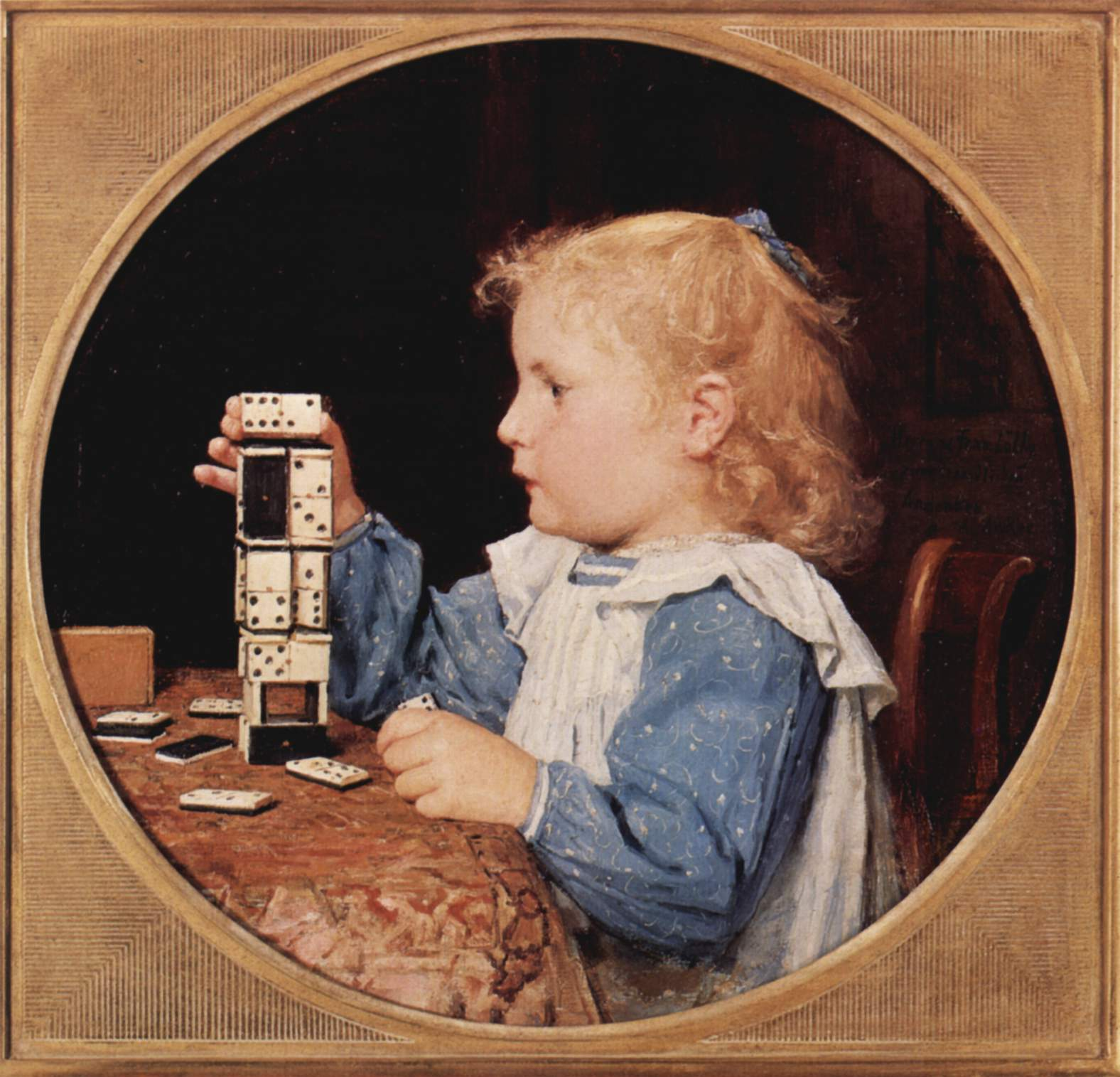
Das Mädchen mit den Dominosteinen

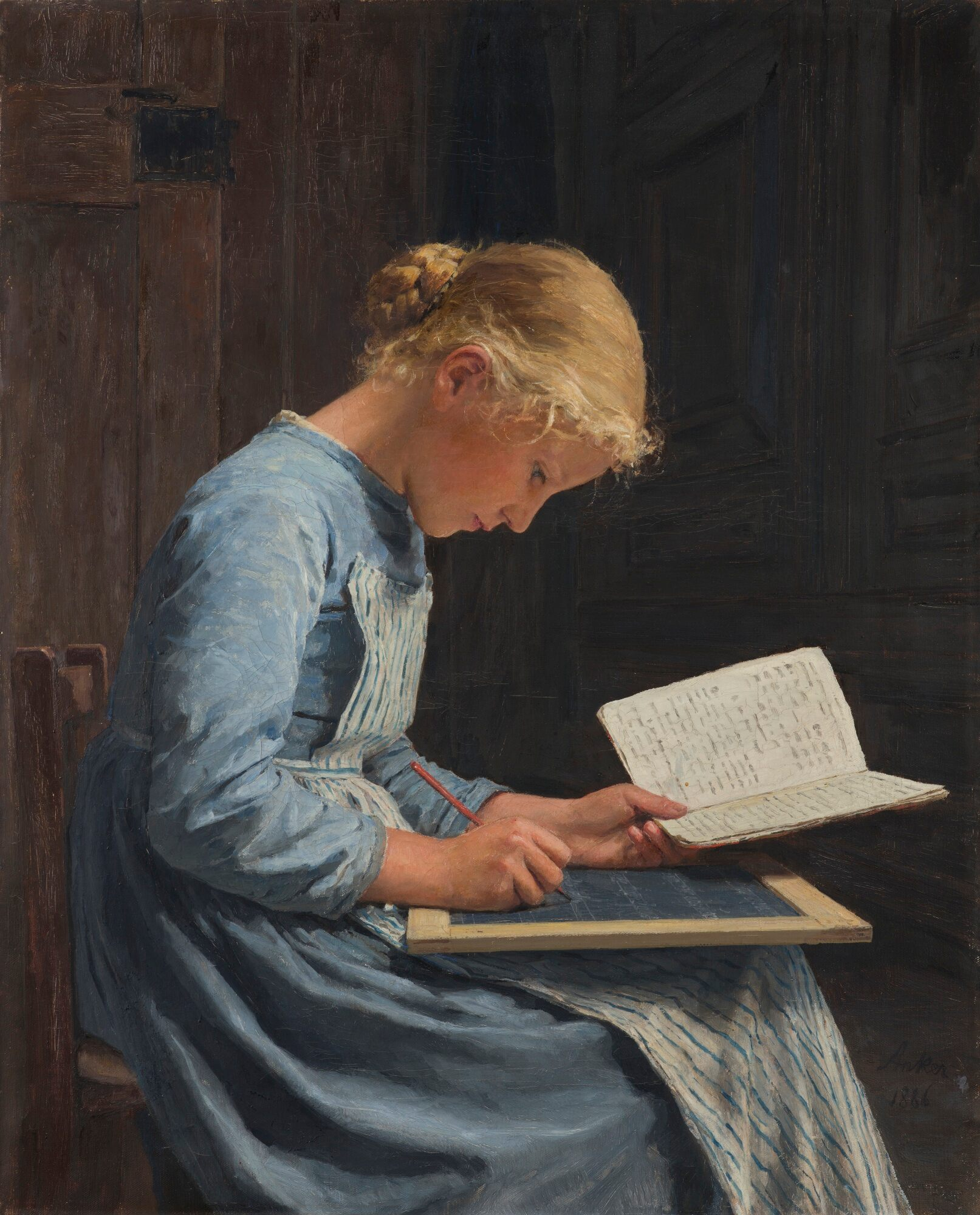
Fleissig / Appliquée, 1886

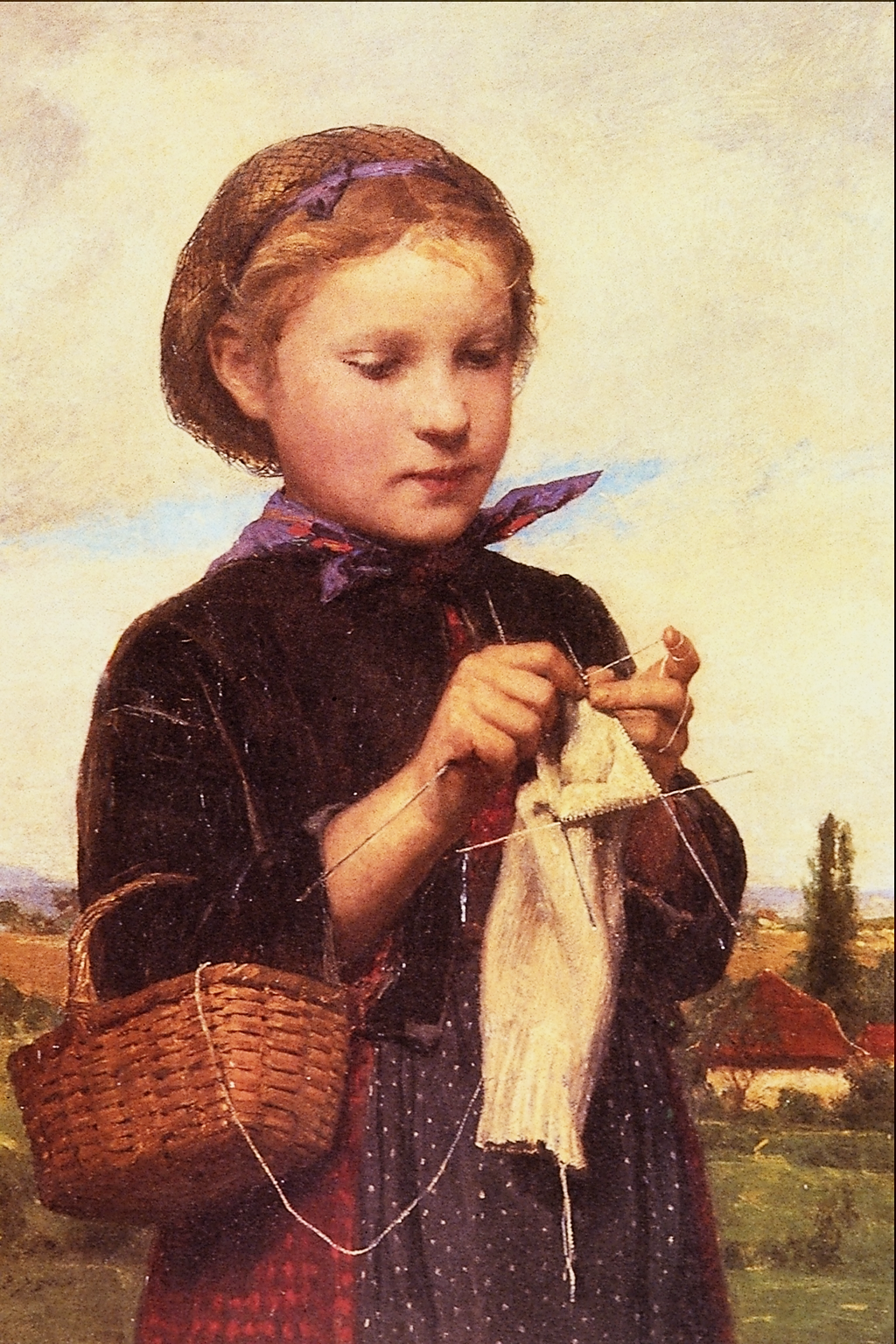

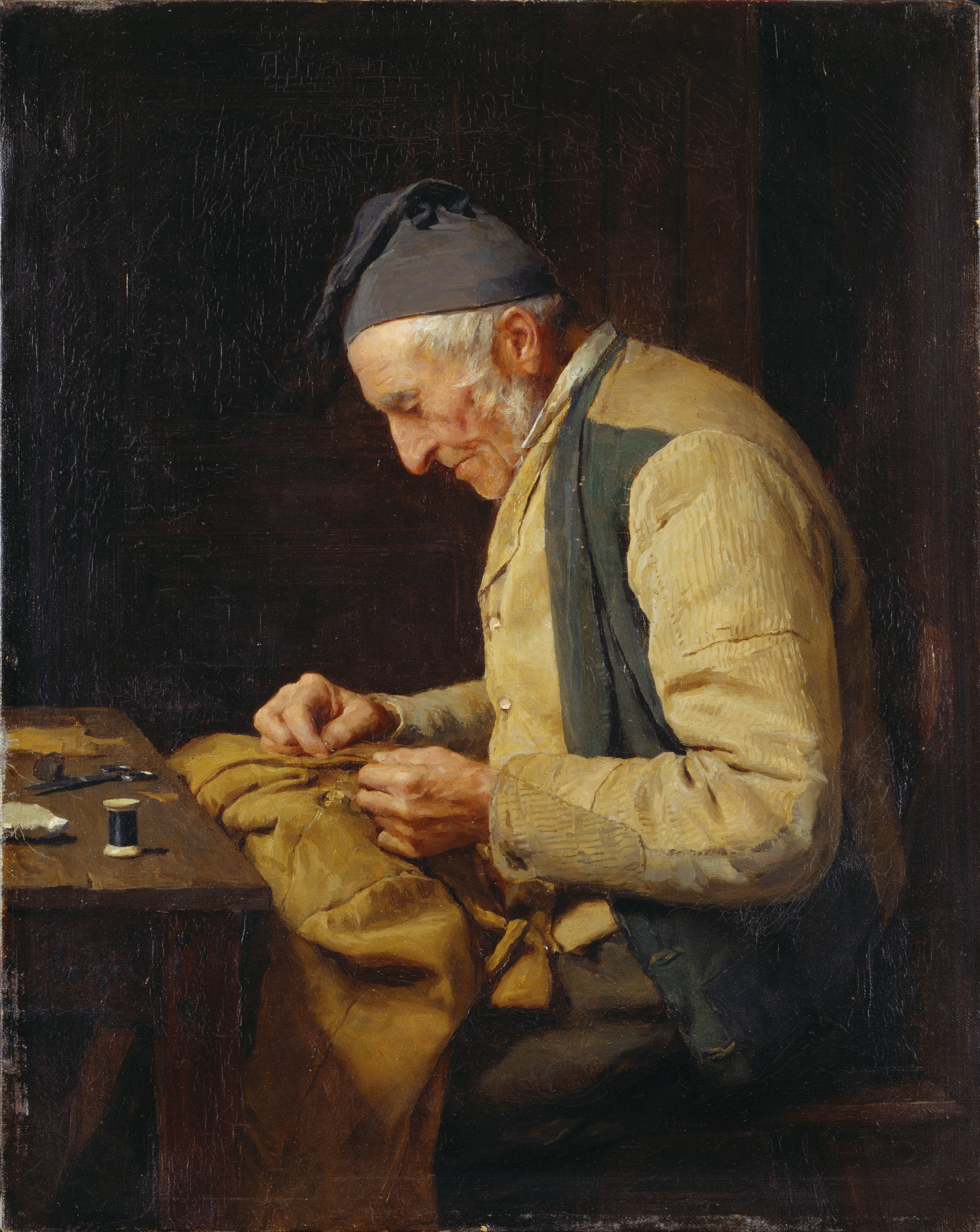
The Village Tailor, 1894

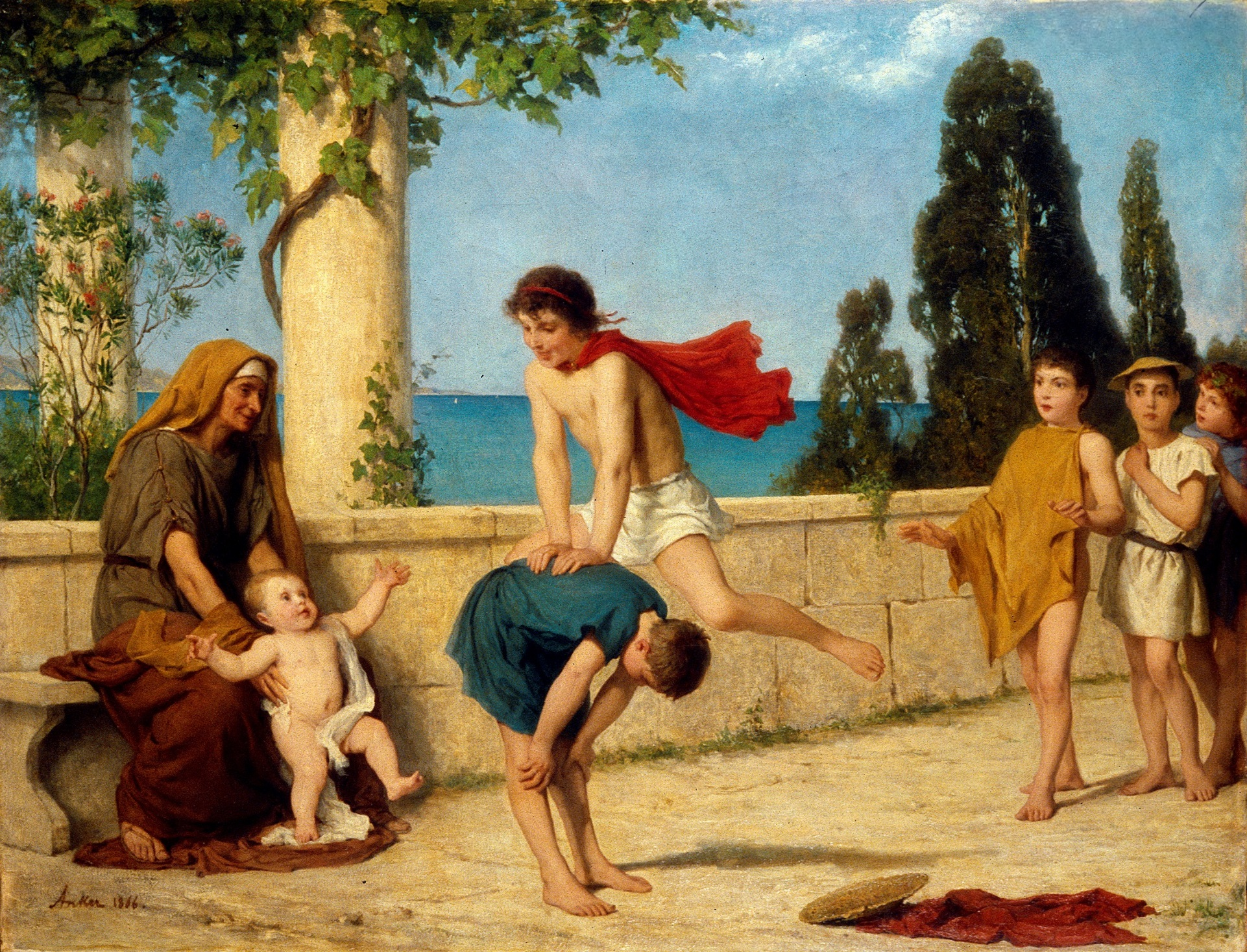
Böckligumpen, 1866

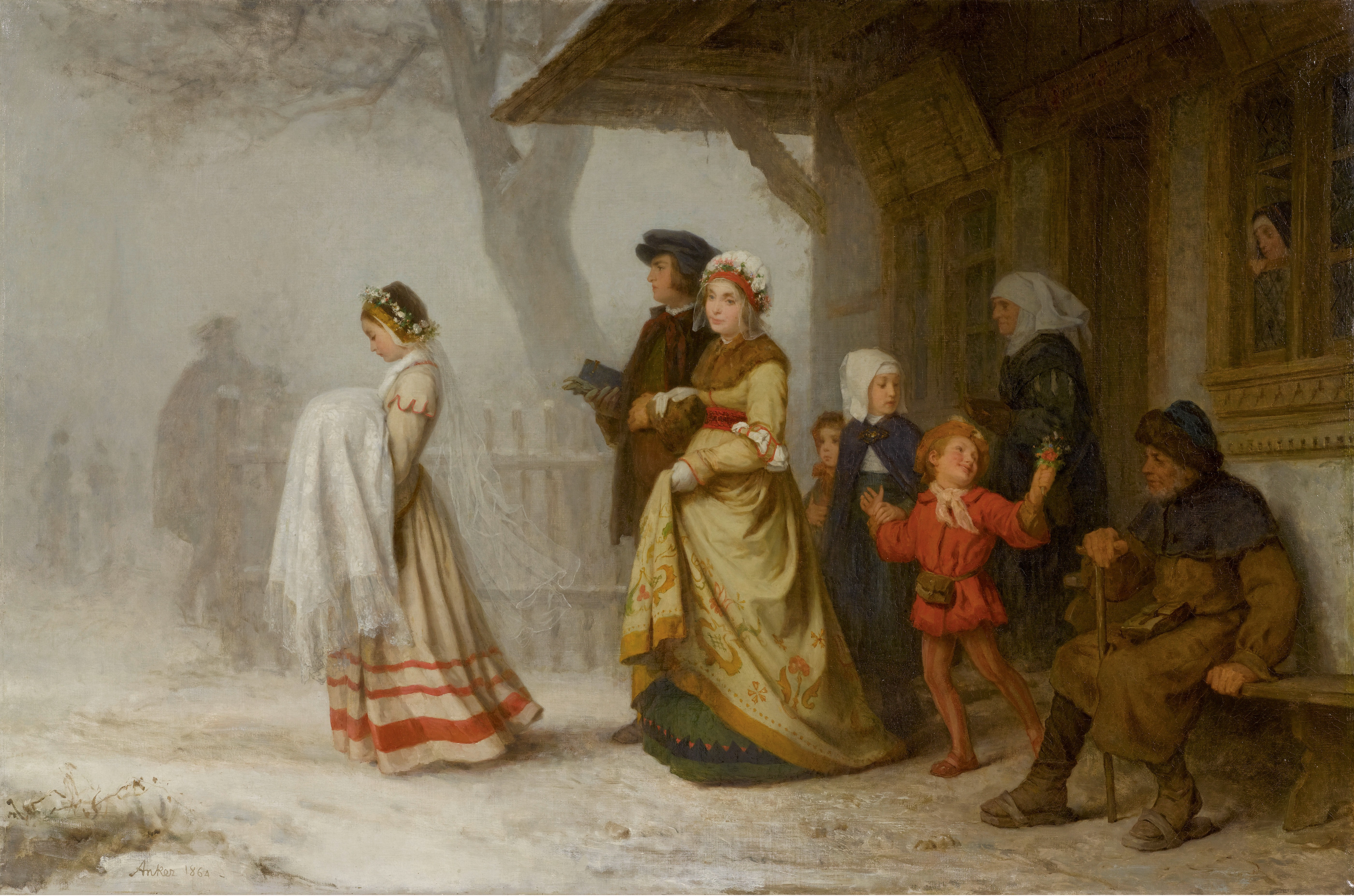
Baptism, 1864

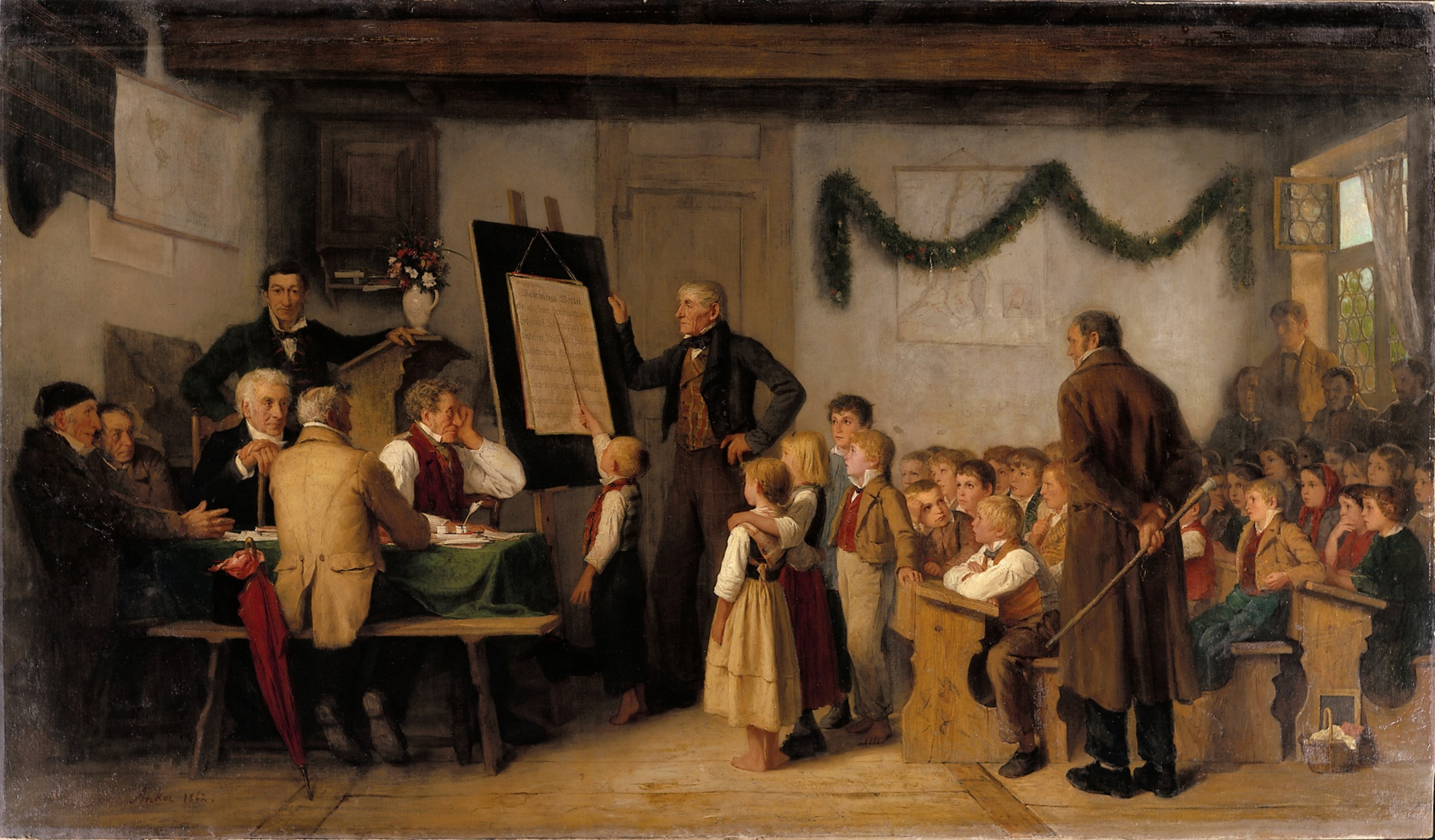
Das Schulexamen The school exam, 1862

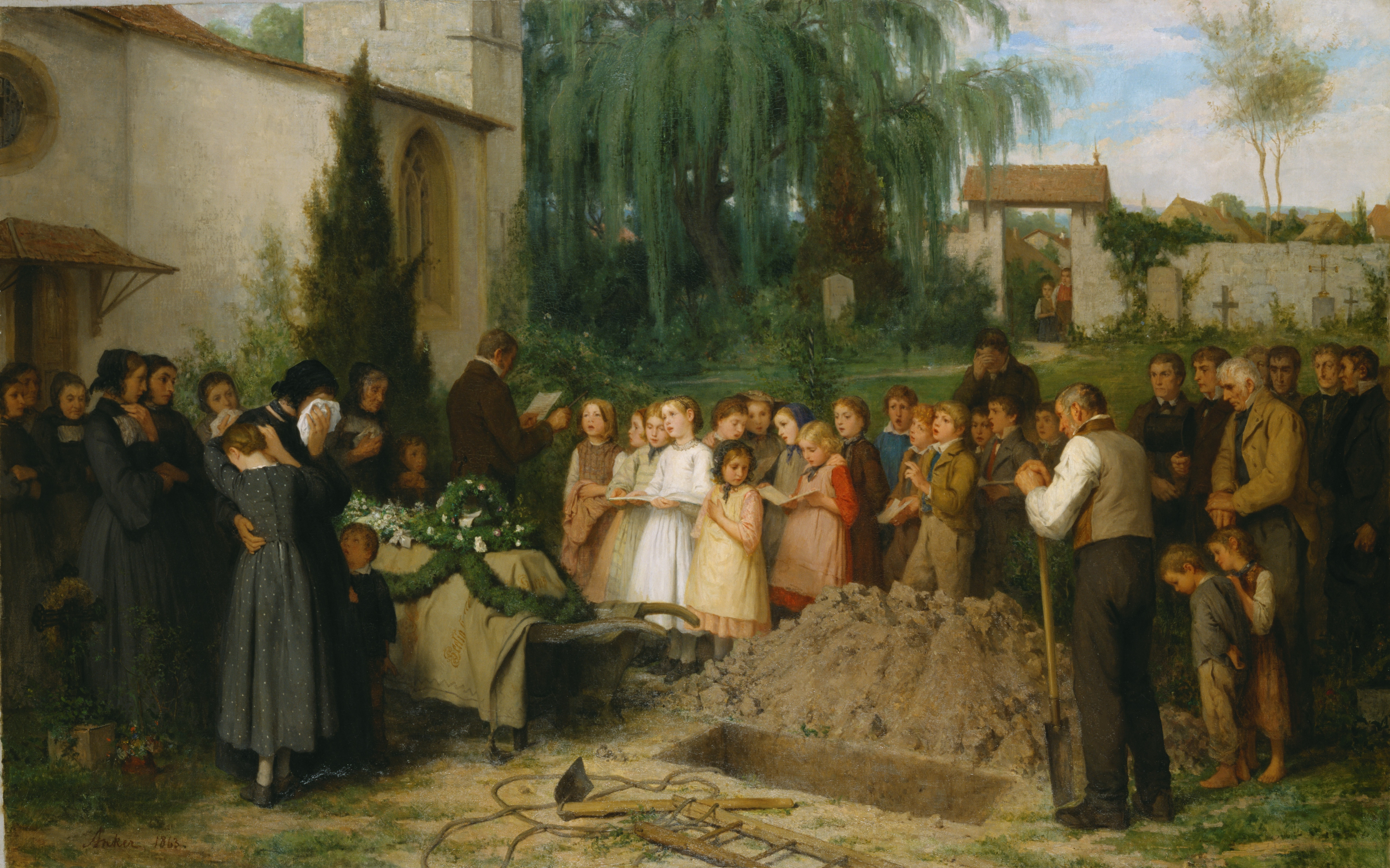
Kinderbegräbnis,1863

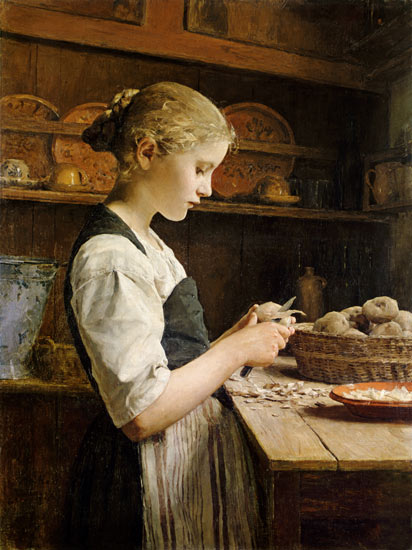
Girl peeling potatoes, 1886, oil on canvas

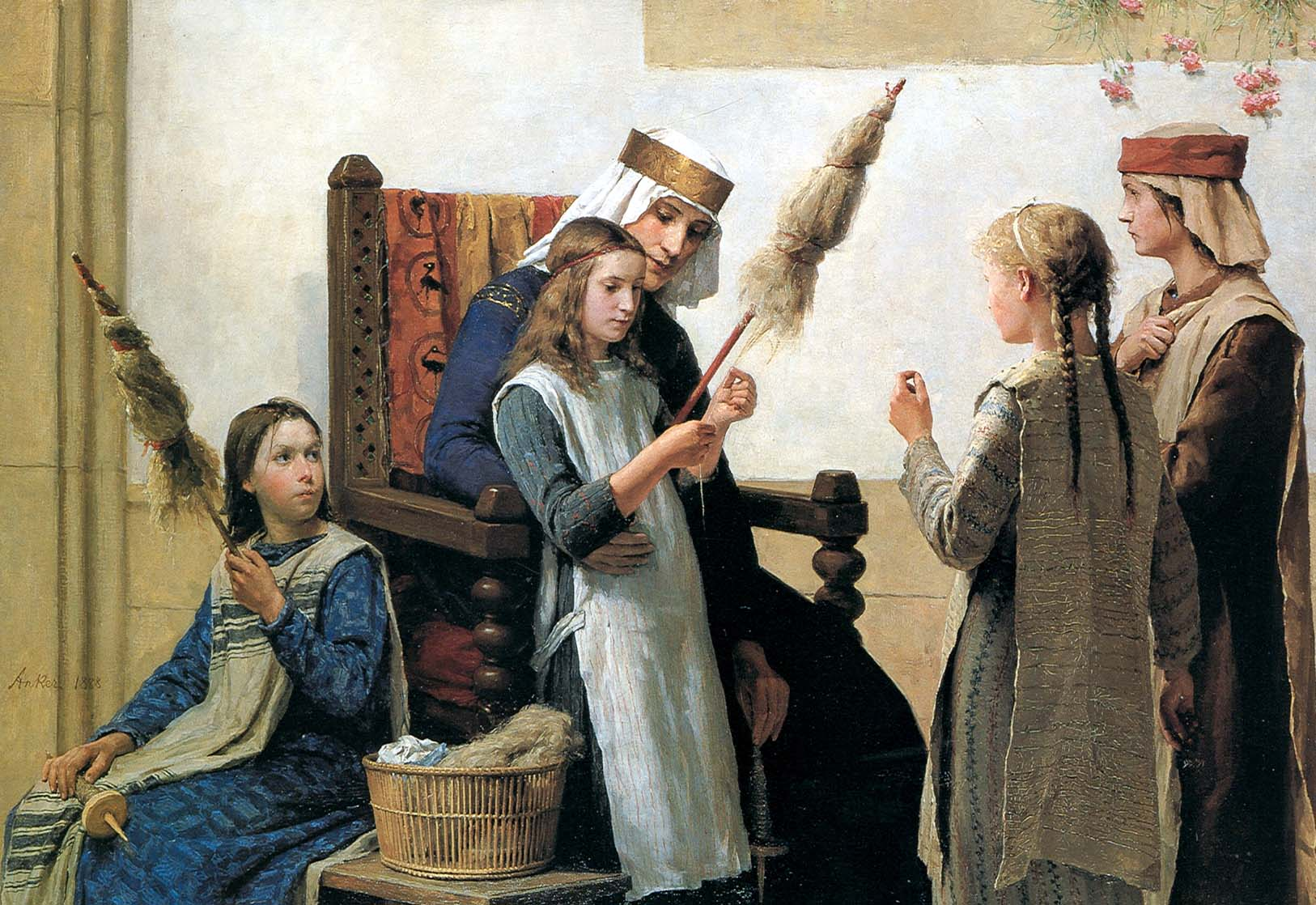
Queen Bertha and the Spinners, 1888

== Bibliography ==
- (in German) H.A. Lüthy, S. Kuthy, Albert Anker (1980)
- (in German) S. Kuthy, T. Bhattacharya-Stettler, Albert Anker, Ölgemälde und Ölstudien (1995)
