= Julian Bühler =

Swiss footballer (born 1985)

Personal information
- Date of birth: 2 February 1985 (age 41)
- Place of birth: Switzerland
- Height: 1.84 m (6 ft 0 in)
- Position: Striker

Team information
- Current team: FC Herrliberg
- Number: 17

Youth career
- FC Basel: FC Herrliberg

Senior career*
Years	Team	Apps	(Gls)
2006–2008	FC Thun		
2008–2010	FC Winterthur		
- * Club domestic league appearances and goals as of 2 January 2008

Julian Bühler (born 2 February 1985) is a Swiss football striker, who currently plays for FC Winterthur.
