= Will Eisenmann =

German-Swiss composer (1906–1992)

Will Eisenmann (3 March 1906 in Stuttgart – 20 August 1992 in Canton of Lucerne) was a German-Swiss composer. His opera Der König der dunklen Kammer, based on a work by Rabindranath Tagore, won the Emil Hertzka Prize.

== Selected works ==
Stage

- Der König der dunklen Kammer, Opera in 13 Scenes, op. 12 (1934–1935); words by Rabindranath Tagore
- Bethsabé, Drama-Pantomime-Oratorio in 3 scenes for tenor, baritone, speaking voices, actors, pantomimists and orchestra, op. 17 (1936); libretto by André Gide
- Leonce und Lena, Lyric Comedy in 3 acts for 7 soloists, 5 speaking parts and a large orchestra, op. 36 (1943–1945); libretto by Georg Büchner

Orchestral

- Die Stadt for string orchestra, op. 7 (1932–1933)
- Primavera española, op. 10 (1934)
- Die gläserne Wand (Davoser Impressionen) for small orchestra, op. 11 (1934)
- Musique en forme de spirale for small orchestra, op. 18 (1937)
- Trauermusik (Epitaphe pour Maurice Ravel), op. 21 (1938)
- Sieben Bilder nach Vincent van Gogh, op. 22 (1938)
- Symphony for string orchestra, op. 42 (1947)
- Musica concertante, op. 96 (1977–1978)

Concertante

- Concerto for alto saxophone and orchestra, op. 24 (1938)
- Concerto da camera for alto saxophone and string orchestra, op. 38 (1945)
- Concerto for soprano and alto saxophones and string orchestra, op. 69 (1962)
- Konfrontationen for flute and orchestra, op. 85 (1972)

Chamber music

- Concertino for violin (or flute) and piano, op. 8 (1933)
- Quartetto mistico, String Quartet No. 1, op. 23 (1938)
- Kleine Ballade / Nevermore for alto saxophone and piano (or organ), op. 28 (1940)
- Duo concertante for alto saxophone and piano, op. 33 (1941, 1957)
- Trio pastorale for violin, viola and cello, op. 37 (1942)
- Streichtrio, op. 39, op. 40 (1946)
- Ballade No. 1 for flute and piano, op. 53 (1952)
- Concertino for cello and piano, op. 54 (1953)
- Divertimento for 2 clarinets and bassoon, op. 55 (1954–1955)
- Musik for viola and piano, op. 60 (1957)
- Musik für Flöte und drei Streicher for flute, violin, viola and cello, op. 61 (1959)
- Lamentatio. In memoriam Clara Haskil for flute, violin and piano, op. 65 (1960)
- Movements for alto saxophone and piano, op. 68 (1961)
- Ballade No. 2 for flute and piano, op. 74 (1964)
- Duo for flute and harp, op. 79 (1970)
- Meditationen for flute and organ, op. 88 (1975)
- Capriccio for tenor saxophone and piano, op. 92 (1977)
- Mouvements concertants for trumpet and organ, op. 95 (1977)
- Improvisation I for flute solo, op. 94 (1977)
- Improvisation II for flute solo, op. 107 (1977)
- Divertissement for 2 violins, op. 98 (1978)
- Quartetto brevis for string quartet, op. 99 (1978)
- Evocation for flute and organ, op. 100 (1980)
- Spiel zu dritt for flute, oboe and bassoon, op. 105 (1983)
- Impression for clarinet solo, op. 108 (1984)
- Metamòrfosi for oboe solo, op. 109 (1985)

Organ

- Fantasie I, op. 45 (1948)
- Fantasie II, op. 77 (1966)
- Toccata, op. 90 (1976)
- Reflessioni, op. 93 (1977)
- Praeludium, op. 97 (1978)
- Fantasie III, op. 106 (1983)

Piano

- Kleine Suite, op. 6 (1932)
- Nocturne, op. 15 (1935)
- Suite der Gegensätze, op. 51 (1949–1951)
- 6 Etüden, op. 57 (1954–1960)
- Konstellationen, op. 66 (1960)
- Varianten, op. 71 (1962)
- Kleine Klavierstücke, op. 78 (1954–1974)
- Trois Images, op. 80 (1970)
- Trois Esquisses, op. 82 (1971)

Vocal

- Drei Gesänge aus Seraphine for high voice and small orchestra, op. 16 (1936); words by Heinrich Heine
- Es Wiegeliedli for voice and piano, op. 30 (1940)
- Hesse-Lieder for voice and piano, op. 32 (1936–1940); words by Hermann Hesse
- Rubaiyat, 2 Song Cycles for voice and piano, op. 35 (1939–1943); words by Omar Khayyám
- Gesänge im Zwielicht for voice and piano, op. 39 (1945); words by Rainer Maria Rilke and Anette Brun
- under der linden for voice and piano, op. 44 (1948); words by Walther von der Vogelweide
- Alkestis, Dramatic Scene for high voice and large orchestra, op. 46 (1948–1949); words by Rainer Maria Rilke
- Marienlegende for high voice, viola and piano, op. 50 (1950); words by Klabund
- Der Teppich des Lebens for voice and piano, op. 52 (1951); words by Stefan George
- Sänge eines fahrenden Spielmanns for alto, viola and piano, op. 56 (1954); words by Stefan George
- Gesänge des Abschieds for voice and piano, op. 58 (1955); words by Georg Heym
- Sechs Gesänge nach Gedichten von Urs Oberlin for medium voice and piano, op. 59 (1956); words by Urs Oberlin
- Acht Gesänge nach Gedichten von Astrid Claes for alto and piano, op. 62 (1959–1960); words by Astrid Claes
- Haiku I. Melodien nach japanischen Dreizeilern for high voice and piano, op. 64 (1960)
- Legende von der Entstehung des Buches Taoteking for medium voice and piano, op. 70 (1962); words by Bertolt Brecht
- Der blinde Passagier for voice and piano, op. 75 (1964)
- Haiku II. Melodien nach japanischen Dreizeilern for high voice and piano, op. 83 (1971)
- Haiku III. Melodien nach heiter-ironischen japanischen Dreizeilern for medium voice, oboe and piano, op. 86 (1973)
- Gesänge zur Nacht for alto and organ, op. 91 (1976); words by Georg Trakl
- Gesänge nach Worten von Linus David for medium voice and piano (or organ), op. 102 (1981); words by Linus David

Choral

- Mallorca-Suite for mixed choir, op. 13 (1936)
- Die Klage Hiobs for baritone, mixed choir, children's choir and large orchestra, op. 49 (1950)
- Threnoi 4 Madrigals for vocal ensemble, op. 67 (1961)
- Aus canto 81 (Pisaner Gesänge) for six-part mixed choir, op. 73 (1963);; words by Ezra Pound
- Der heilige Martin von Tours, Motets for vocal ensemble or four-part mixed choir, op. 89 (1975); words by the composer
