= Benjamin Romieux =

Swiss journalist (1914–1988)

- Born: 1914
- Died: 1988 (aged 73–74)
- Occupations: Journalist, radio host

Benjamin Romieux (1914–1988) was a Swiss journalist.

Romieux played a prominent role in the development of information at Radio Suisse Romande. He directed the shows The Mirror of Time and The Mirror of the World and was subsequently appointed head of the Information Department.

Romieux was described as an advocate of free information.

== Biography ==
From his real name Camille Lagalisse, Benjamin Romieux is born of French parents. In 1959, he acquired the bourgeois of the Vaud commune of Chardonne and in 1960 he married the actress Jane Rosier.

After working at the Journal and the Gazette de Lausanne, between Benjamin Romieux in 1938 at Radio Lausanne where he became host and producer waves, author of operas and plays, creator of several shows. For radio, in his second pseudonym, Jean Servien, adapt amount of dramatic 2.

From 1943, he devoted himself mainly to the news program The Mirror of Time, which later became The Mirror of the World. He introduces listeners to the great figures of the time, such as Albert Schweitzer or Emmanuel d'Astier de la Vigerie . Promoted head of the international news service of Radio Suisse Romande, he finished his career as head of the radio news department from 1973 to 1979.

In 1954, he was awarded the Palmes académiques for "his concern for honest information, his warm interest in everything he undertakes, his dynamism builder". In 1955, he created the show Discanalyse with Julien-François Zbinden, Géo Voumard, Yette Perrin and Michel Dénériaz. Gastronome and gourmet, Benjamin Romieux was Provost of the Confraternity of Guillon and he chaired the jury of the Gastronomic Literary Grand Prix of the Swiss Academy of Gastronomers.

== Radio broadcasts ==
- A chorus runs in the street
- Disc analysis from 1955 to 1975
- The world this fortnight
- The mirror of time
- The mirror of the world
