= Otto Stich =

Swiss politician, professor (1927–2012)

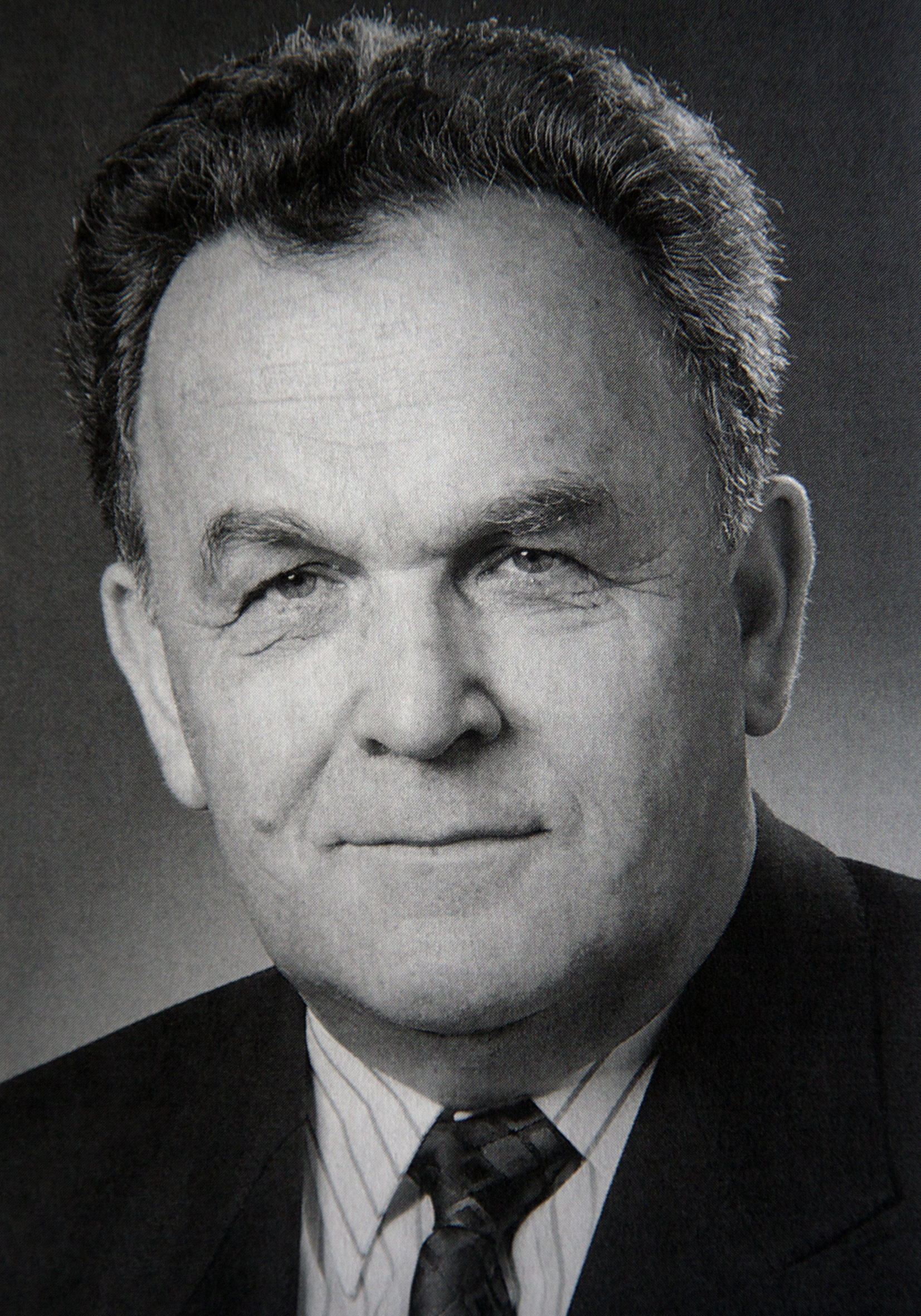

Member of the Swiss Federal Council
- In office 1984–1995

President of Switzerland
- In office 1 January 1994 – 31 January 1994

Personal details
- Born: Otto Anton Stich; 10 January 1927 Basel, Basel-Stadt, Switzerland
- Died: 13 September 2012 (aged 85) Dornach, Solothurn, Switzerland
- Party: Social Democratic Party
- Spouse: Gertrud Stampfli
- Children: 2

Otto Anton Stich (10 January 1927 – 13 September 2012) was a Swiss professor and politician. He served as a member of the Swiss Federal Council from 1984 to 1995 and held the Swiss presidency in 1988 and 1994.

== Early life and education ==
Stich was born in Basel, Switzerland to Otto and Rosa Stich (née Gunzinger). His father was a mechanic and he had a modest upbringing in Dornach, where he attended middle and high school. He studied at the University of Basel and graduated with a diploma in Economics. In 1953, he became a diplomed teacher, in 1955 he completed his doctorate of philosophy in Political science.

He then taught at the vocational school in Basel, the subjects German, Economics and Political Science.

== Politics ==
He was elected to the Federal Council of Switzerland on 7 December 1983 and handed over office on 31 October 1995. He was affiliated to the Social Democratic Party

During his time in office he held the Federal Department of Finance and was President of the Confederation twice in 1988 and 1994.

== Personal life ==
Stich was married to Gertrud Trudi Stampfli. They had a son and a daughter.

He died on 13 September 2012 at the age of 85.

Preceded by Willy Ritschard	Member of the Swiss Federal Council; 1983–1995	Succeeded by Moritz Leuenberger
