= List of Swiss people =

This is a list of people associated with the modern Switzerland and the Old Swiss Confederacy. Regardless of ethnicity or emigration, the list includes notable natives of Switzerland and its predecessor states as well as people who were born elsewhere but spent most of their active life in Switzerland. For more information see the articles Swiss people and Demographics of Switzerland.

== Archaeology ==
- Eric Breuer, archaeologist
- Ferdinand Keller (1800–1881), archaeologist
- Heinrich Menu von Minutoli (1772–1846), archaeologist

- Jean-Marc Moret (born 1942), archaeologist and art historian
- Fritz Puempin (1901–1972), archeologist and painter
- Karl Schefold (1905–1999), classical archaeologist

== Actors ==
- Pasquale Aleardi (born 1971), actor and musician
- Lukas Ammann (1928–2017), actor
- Ursula Andress (born 1936), actress
- Peter Arens (1928–2015), actor and stage director
- Joel Basman (born 1990), actor
- Giuseppe Bausilio (born 1997), actor, dancer and singer
- Jean-Luc Bideau (born 1940), comedian
- Anne-Marie Blanc (1919–2009), actress
- Ursula Cantieni (1947–2023), actress
- Ettore Cella (1913–2004), actor and director
- Dimitri (1935–2016), clown
- Annemarie Düringer (1925–2014), film, television and stage actress
- Bruno Ganz (1941–2019), actor
- Kat Graham (born 1989), actress, singer, model
- Viktor Giacobbo (born 1952), actor and comedian
- Mathias Gnädinger (1941–2015), actor
- Curt Goetz (1888–1960), actor and film director
- Heinrich Gretler (1897–1977), actor
- Grock (1880–1959), clown
- Gardi Hutter (born 1953), clown, entertainer and actress
- Rebecca Indermaur (born 1976), actress
- Irène Jacob (born 1966), actress
- Roger Jendly (born 1938), actor

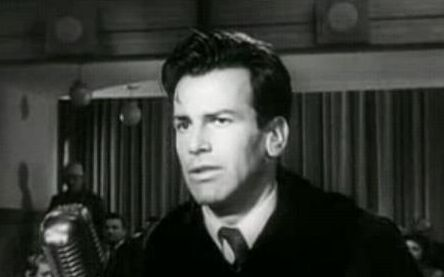
Maximilian Schell

- Carla Juri (born 1985), actress
- Marthe Keller (born 1945), actress and opera director
- Christian Kohlund (born 1950), actor
- Mathis Künzler (born 1978), film, television and stage actor
- Stefan Kurt (born 1959), actor
- Ursina Lardi (born 1970), actress
- Max Loong (born 1980), actor and producer
- Walo Lüönd (1927–2012), actor
- Andreas Matti (born 1959), actor
- Ursela Monn (born 1950), actress and singer
- Vincent Perez (born 1964), actor and director
- Liselotte Pulver (born 1929), actress
- Alfred Rasser (1907–1977), actor and comedian
- Maximilian Schell (1930–2014), actor and producer
- Hannes Schmidhauser (1926–2000), actor, screenwriter and film director
- Michel Simon (1895–1975), actor and comedian
- Emil Steinberger (born 1933), comedian
- Sigfrit Steiner (1906–1988), actor
- Sabine Timoteo (born 1975), actress
- Renée Weibel (born 1989), actor
- Roeland Wiesnekker (born 1967), actor

== Art ==
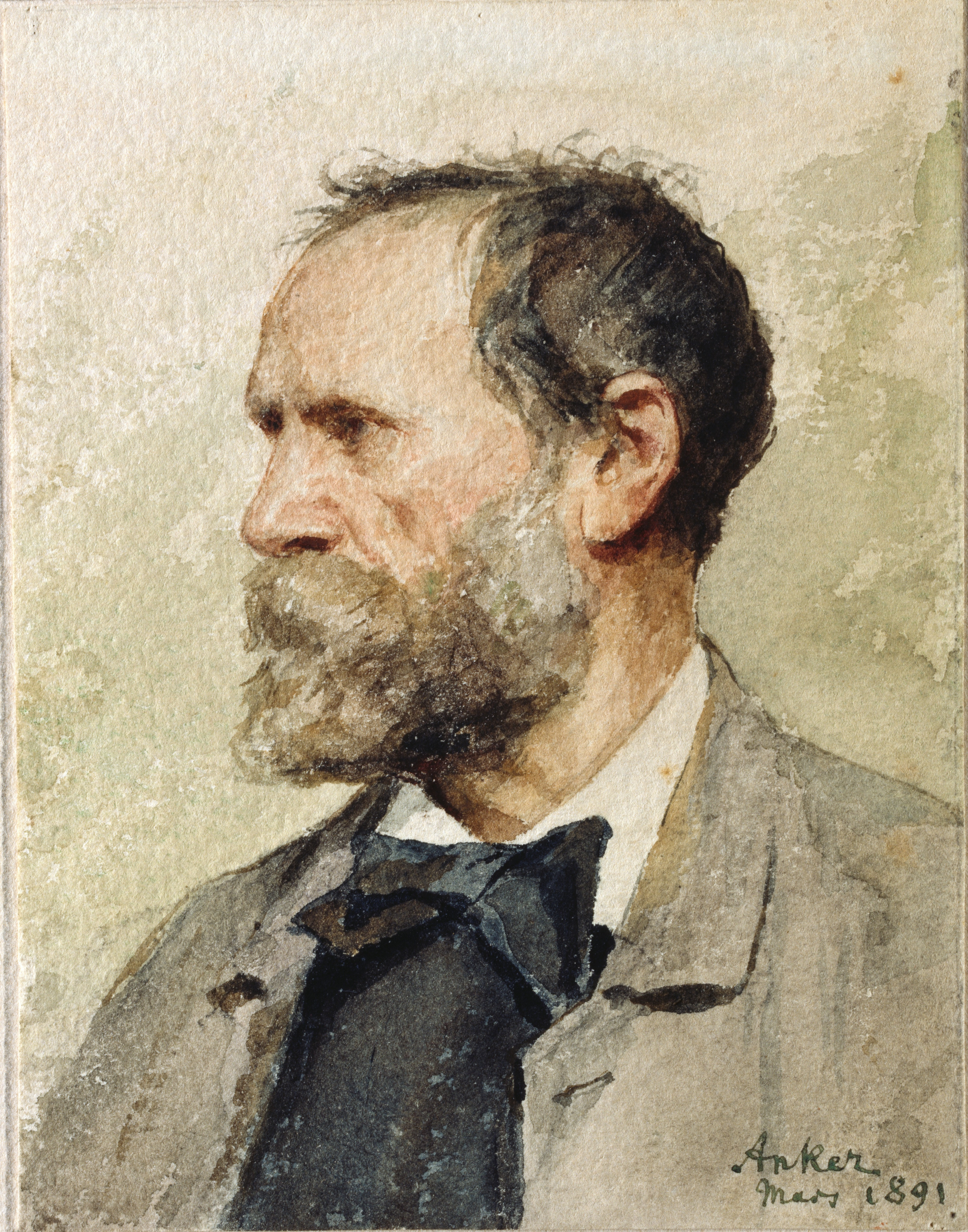
Albert Anker

- Arthur Aesbacher (1923–2020), poster artist
- Jacques-Laurent Agasse (1767–1849), painter
- Cuno Peter Amiet (1868–1961)
- Thomas Ammann (1950–1993), art dealer and collector
- Albert Anker (1831–1910)
- Jean Arcelin (born 1962), painter
- Jean Arp (1886–1966), sculptor, painter and poet
- René Auberjonois (1872–1957), painter
- John Bernhard (born 1957), photographer
- Klaus Bietenholz (1924–2015), cubist painter
- François Bocion (1828–1890), painter
- Arnold Böcklin (1827–1901), painter
- Karl Bodmer (1809–1893), painter of the American West
- Ferdinand Brader (1833–1901), folk art sketch artist of rural farm life in USA
- Mark Staff Brandl (born 1955), painter, installation artist, and critic
- Sonam Dolma Brauen (born 1953), Swiss-Tibetan sculptor and painter
- Frank Buchser (1828–1890), painter
- Alexandre Calame (1810–1864), painter
- Eugène Cattin (1866–1947), photographer
- Jean Crotti (1878–1958), painter
- Adèle d'Affry (1836–1879), artist and sculptor
- Jean Dunand (1877–1942), decorative artist, sculptor
- Carl Durheim (1810–1890), lithographer and photographer
- Hans Erni (1909–2015)
- Fischli & Weiss (born 1946 & 1952), artist duo
- Adrian Frutiger (1928–2015), typeface designer
- Henry Fuseli (Johann Heinrich Füssli) (1741–1825), painter
- Johann Caspar Füssli (1706–1782), portrait painter
- Johann Kaspar Füssli (1743–1786), entomologist
- Karl Gerstner (1930–2017), graphic designer and painter
- Salomon Gessner (1730–1788)
- Alberto Giacometti (1901–1966), sculptor, painter
- H. R. Giger (1940–2014), illustrator
- Anton Graff (1736–1813), painter
- Eugène Grasset (1845–1917), decorative artist
- Willi Gutmann (1927–2013), sculptor
- Stefan Haenni (born 1958), painter
- Peter Hartmann (1921–2007), sculptor
- Andreas Heusser (1976), conceptual artist and curator
- Ferdinand Hodler (1853–1918), painter

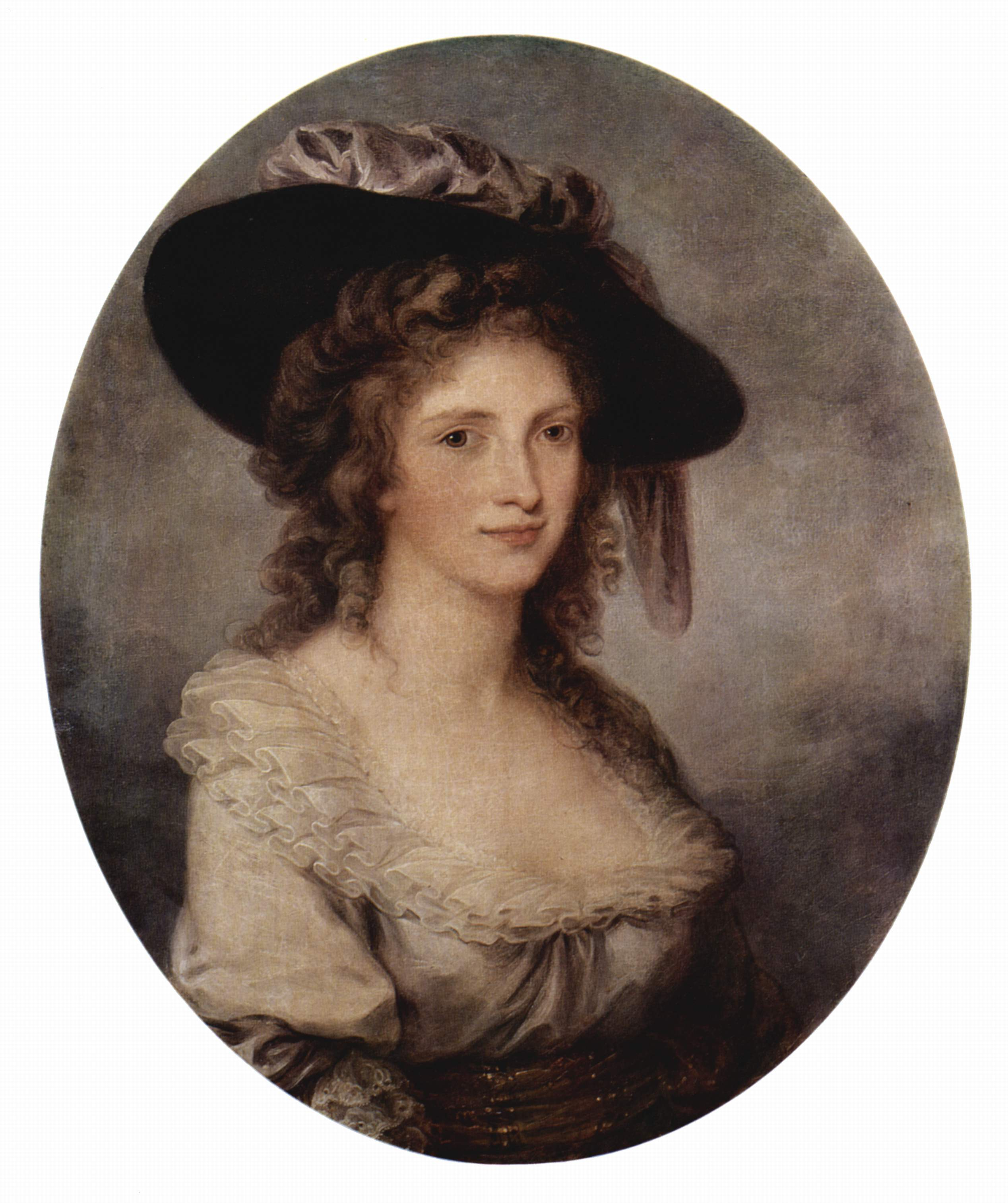
Angelica Kauffman

- Max Huber (1919–1992), graphic designer
- Anna Indermaur (1894–1980), painter and sculptor
- Robert Indermaur (born 1947), painter and sculptor
- Angelica Kauffman (1741–1807), painter
- Jorg Khun (1940–1964), wildlife artist and illustrator
- Paul Klee (1879–1940), painter
- Rudolf Koller (1828–1905), painter
- Josef Benedikt Kuriger (1754–1819), sculptor
- Rosa Lachenmeier (born 1959), contemporary artist
- Catherine Leutenegger (born 1983), visual artist
- Albert "Lindi" Lindegger (1904–1991), illustrator and painter
- Rochus Lussi (born 1965), artist
- Niklaus Manuel (1484–1530), painter
- Auguste de Niederhausern-Rodo (1863–1913), sculptor
- Sibylle Pasche (born 1976), sculptor
- Roger Pfund (1943-2024), painter, graphic designer
- James Pradier (1790–1852), sculptor
- Marc Raymond (born 1968), sculptor
- Joseph Reinhart (1749–1824), painter
- Oskar Reinhart (1885–1965), collector
- Iris von Roten-Meyer (1917–1990), lawyer and artist

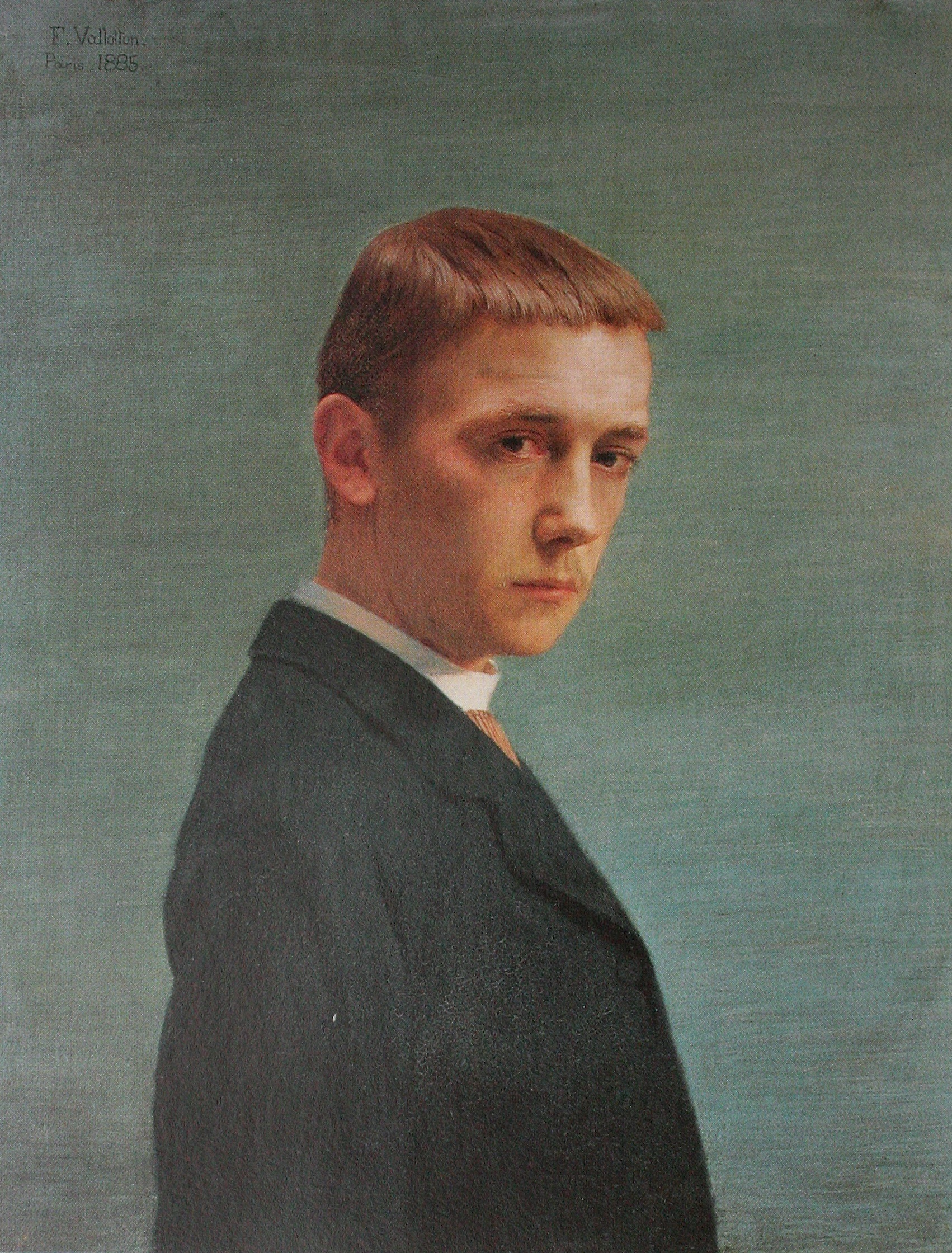
Félix Vallotton

- Jacques Sablet (1749–1803), painter
- Niki de Saint Phalle (1930–2002), sculptor, became Swiss in 1971
- Albin Schweri (1885–1946), painter, glass painter
- Peter Schweri (1939–2016), painter, illustrator
- Nadja Sieger (born 1968), comedian, actress, jazz-vocalist, known as Nadeschkin
- Gerold Späth (born 1939), Swiss poet and writer
- Théophile Steinlen (1859–1923), painter and printmaker
- Harald Szeemann (1933–2005), curator
- Sophie Taeuber-Arp (1889–1943), painter, sculptor
- Myriam Thyes (born 1963), new media artist
- Jean Tinguely (1925–1991), kinetic artist
- Rodolphe Toepffer (1799–1846)
- Félix Vallotton (1865–1925), painter
- Isabelle Waldberg (1911–1990), sculptor
- Ricco Wassmer (1915–1972), painter
- Marianne von Werefkin (1860–1938), painter

== Aviation ==
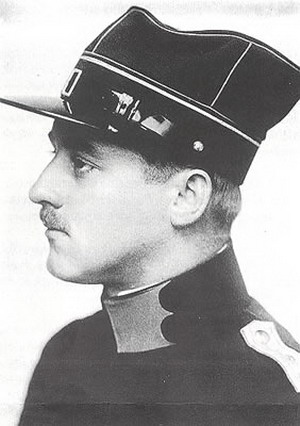
Oskar Bider

- Oskar Bider (1891–1919), aviation pioneer
- Alfred Comte (1895–1965), pilot, co-director Ad Astra Aero, engineer
- Raphaël Domjan (born 1972), explorer, founder and pilot of SolarStratos
- Armand Dufaux (1883–1941)
- Henri Dufaux (1879–1980)
- Ernest Failloubaz (1892–1919), pilot, instructor, Swiss pilot's brevet number 1
- René Grandjean (1884–1963), pilot, engineer
- Else Haugk (1889–1973), first Swiss woman to earn a pilot's licence in May 1914
- Walter Mittelholzer (1894–1937), pilot, director of Ad Astra Aero, Swissair

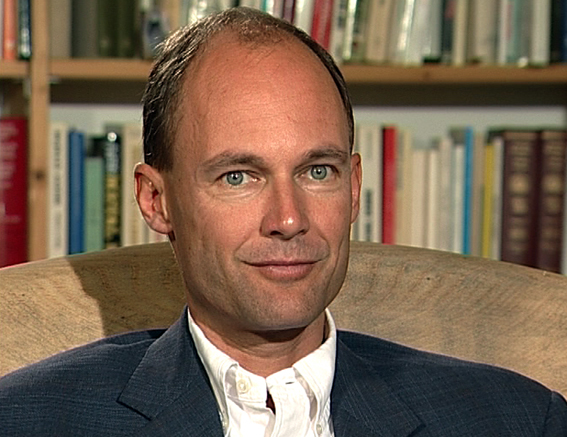
Bertrand Piccard

- Claude Nicollier (born 1944), pilot, astronaut
- Bertrand Piccard (born 1958), psychiatrist, balloonist, founder and pilot of Solar Impulse
- Yves Rossy (born 1959), pilot, "jet-man"
- Eduard Spelterini (1852–1931), balloonist
- Emile Taddéoli (1879–1920), pilot, Swiss pilot's brevet number 2, chief pilot on seaplanes Ad Astra Aero

== Business ==
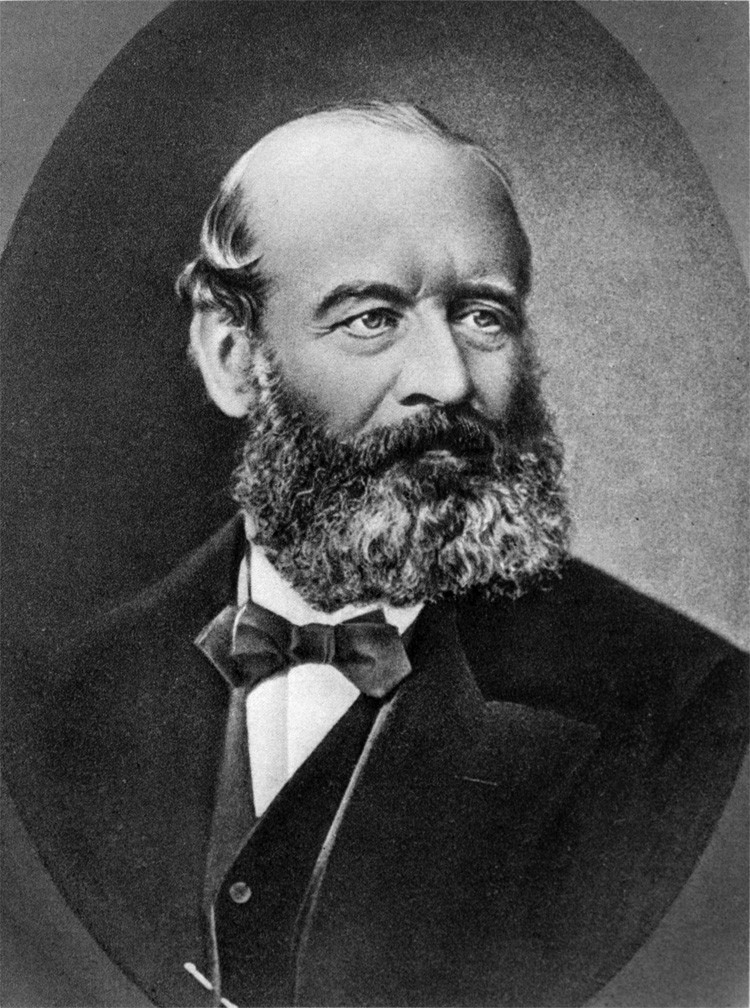
Alfred Escher

- Daniel Aegerter (born 1969), investor and entrepreneur
- Carl Franz Bally (1821–1899), founder of the Bally Shoe company
- Ernesto Bertarelli (born 1965), entrepreneur, founder of Team Alinghi
- Daniel Borel (born 1950), founder of Logitech
- Abraham-Louis Breguet (1747–1823), watchmaker
- François-Louis Cailler (1796–1852), chocolatier
- Arthur Chevrolet (1884–1946), automobile engineer, race car driver, entrepreneur
- Louis Chevrolet (1878–1941), automobile engineer, race car driver, founder of Chevrolet
- Claudio Cisullo (born 1964), entrepreneur
- Raphael H. Cohen (born 1953), serial entrepreneur and business angel
- Yomi Denzel (born 1996), entrepreneur and YouTuber
- Rolf Dobelli (born 1966), entrepreneur, author and founder of the World Minds foundation
- Gottlieb Duttweiler (1888–1962), entrepreneur, founder of Migros
- Alfred Escher (1819–1882), statesman, businessman and railway constructor
- Hans Conrad Escher von der Linth (1767–1823), architect of the Lint melioration
- Marc Faber (born 1946), investment analyst and entrepreneur
- Louis Favre (1826–1879), engineer of the Gotthard tunnel

- Elsa Gasser (1896–1967), economist, business executive
- Nessim Gaon (1922–2022), financier, founder of the Noga company
- Adolf Guyer-Zeller (1839–1899), railway entrepreneur
- Nicolas Hayek (1928–2010), entrepreneur, chairman, Swatch Group

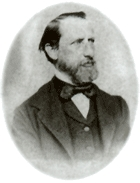
Henri Nestlé

- Pierre Hemmer (1950–2013), one of the Internet pioneers in Switzerland
- Baron Jean-Conrad Hottinguer (1764–1841), banker
- Henri Nestlé (1814–1890), founder of Nestlé S.A.
- Daniel Peter (1836–1919), inventor of milk chocolate
- Georges Edouard Piaget (1855–1931), watchmaker
- Beat Fischer von Reichenbach (1641–1698), held postal monopoly in Bern
- Werner Reinhart (1884–1951), industrialist, philanthropist, music and literature patron
- Tibor Rosenbaum (1923–1980), businessman
- Guy Spier (born 1966), investor, author
- Philippe Suchard (1797–1884), chocolatier
- Ernst Thomke (born 1939) in Biel/Bienne, turnaround manager, e.g. Swatch
- Daniel Vasella (born 1953), chairman of Swiss pharmaceutical company Novartis AG
- Reto Wittwer, hotelier, former hotel president and CEO
- Martin Schlegel (born 1976), economist, chairman of the Swiss National Bank

== Dancers ==
- Giuseppe Bausilio (born 1997), performs on Broadway in the titular role in the Tony Award-winning musical Billy Elliot
- Flore Revalles (1889–1966), principal dancer with Ballets Russes c. 1915–1918

== Filmmakers ==
- Arthur Cohn (1927-2025), film producer, received six Oscars
- Marc Forster (born 1969), film director, Monster's Ball, Finding Neverland, and the James Bond movie Quantum of Solace
- Jean-Luc Godard (1930–2022), director, screenwriter and critic
- Claude Goretta (1929–2019), director
- Moritz de Hadeln (born 1940), director, film festival director

- Markus Imhoof (born 1941), director
- Xavier Koller (born 1944), director
- Juerg Neuenschwander (born 1953), director
- Daniel Schmid (1941–2006), director
- Alain Tanner (1929–2022), director
- Ruth Waldburger (born 1951), producer

== Mathematics ==
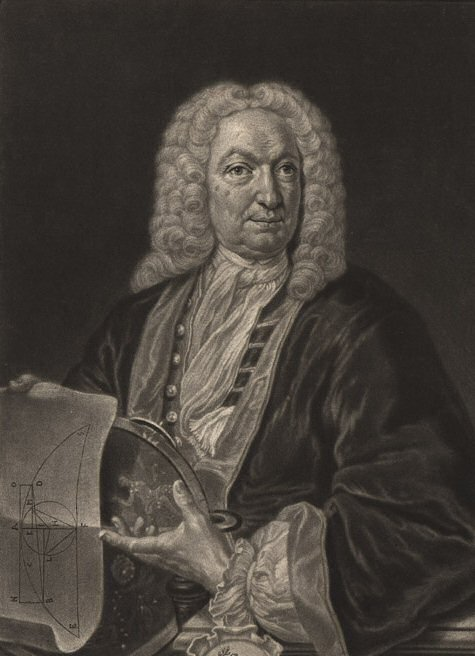
Johann Bernoulli

- Paul Bernays (1888–1977), made significant contributions to mathematical logic, axiomatic set theory, and the philosophy of mathematics
- Daniel Bernoulli (1700–1782), mathematician and physicist
- Jakob Bernoulli (1654–1705), Swiss mathematician
- Johann Bernoulli (1667–1748), Swiss mathematician
- Daniel Bleichenbacher (born 1964), mathematician and cryptographer
- Armand Borel (1923–2003), mathematician

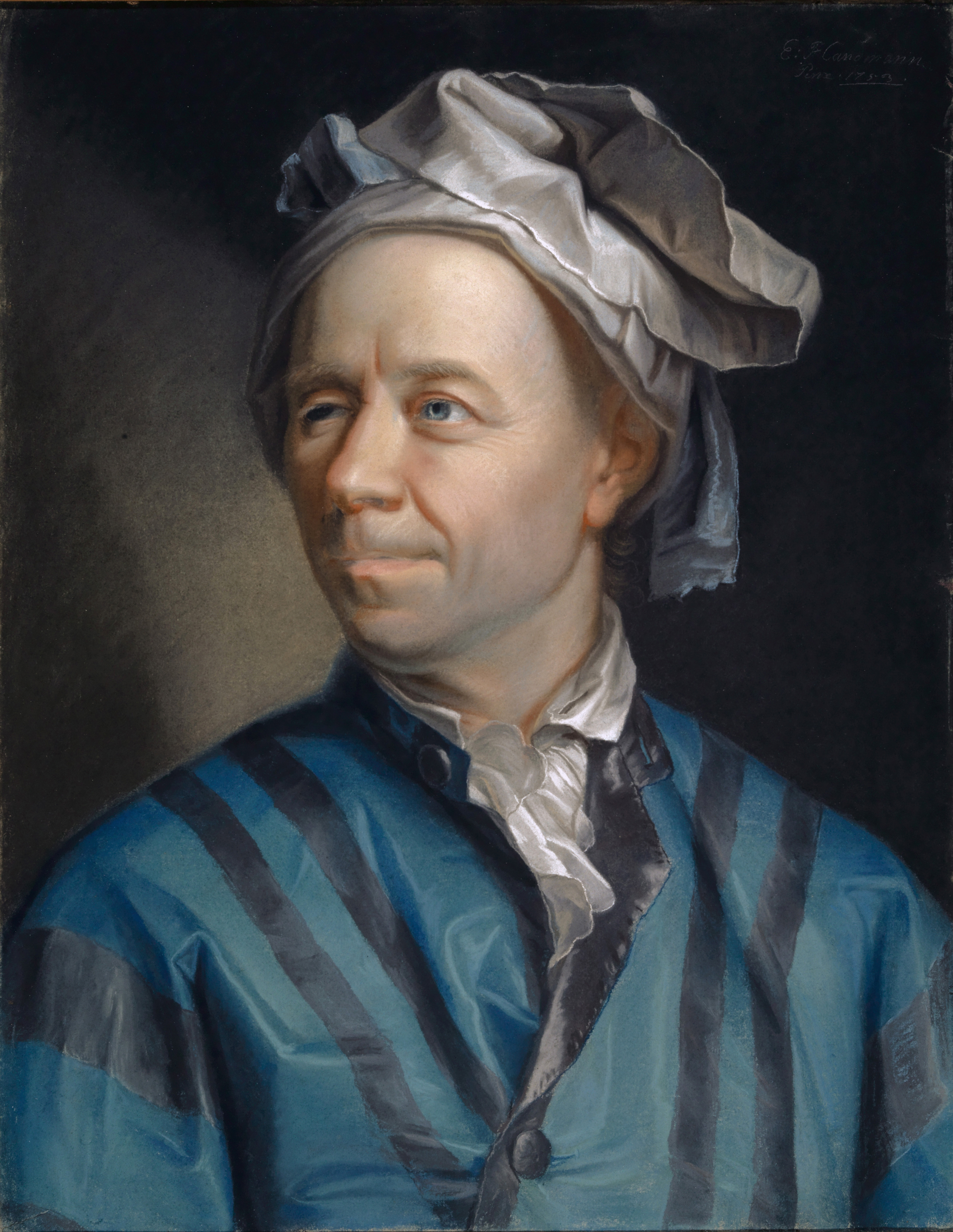
Leonhard Euler

- Leonhard Euler (1707–1783), mathematician and geometer
- Hugo Hadwiger (1908–1981), mathematician
- Marius Lacombe (1862-1938), mathematician
- Edward Kofler (1911–2007), mathematician
- Konrad Osterwalder (born 1942), mathematician and physicist
- Michel Plancherel (1885–1967), mathematician
- Georges de Rham (1903–1990), mathematician
- Ludwig Schläfli (1814–1895), mathematician
- Jakob Steiner (1796–1863), mathematician and physicist
- Ernst Specker (1920–2011), mathematician
- Eduard Stiefel (1909–1978), mathematician

== Military ==
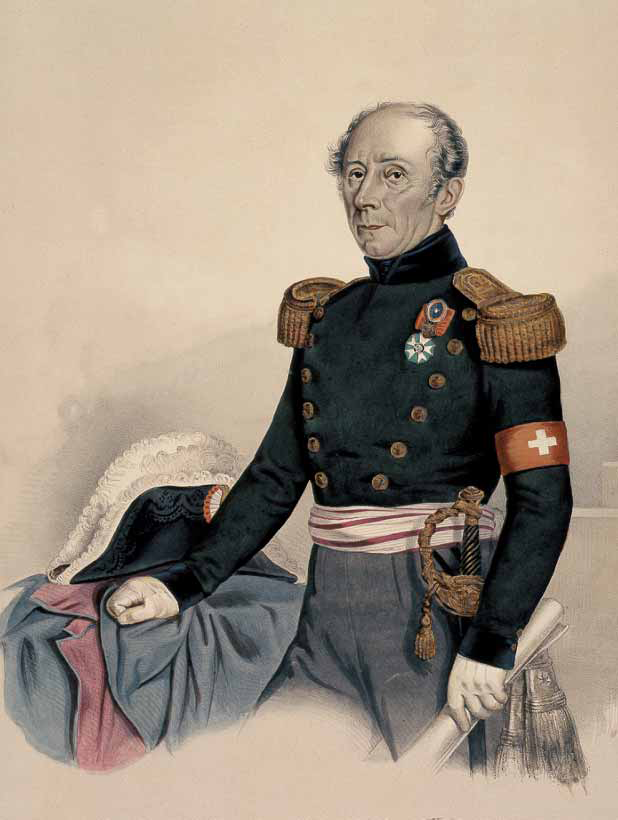
Guillaume-Henri Dufour

- Pierre Victor Besenval de Bronstatt (1721–1791)
- Guillaume-Henri Dufour (1787–1875), General, geographer
- Henri Guisan (1874–1960), General during World War II
- Hans Herzog (1819–1894), General 1870–1871
- Antoine-Henri Jomini (1779–1869), General, military writer

- Christophe Keckeis (born 1945), Chief of the Armed Forces (2004–2007)
- Elmar Mäder, commander of the Swiss Guard (2002–)
- Pius Segmüller (born 1952), commander of the Swiss Guard (1998–2002)
- Theophil Sprecher von Bernegg (1850–1927)
- Ulrich Wille (1848–1925), General during World War I

== Music ==
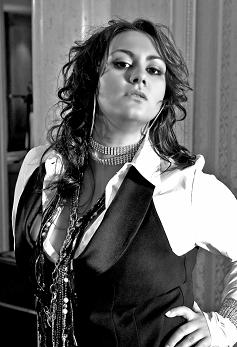
Claudia D'Addio

- Mia Aegerter (born 1976), pop musician
- Martin Eric Ain (born 1967), Celtic Frost bassist
- Ernest Ansermet (1883–1969), conductor
- Lys Assia (1924–2018), singer
- Chiara Banchini (born 1946), violinist, conductor
- Manon Bannerman (born 2002), singer, model, member of Katseye
- Rene Baumann (born 1968), musician, dancer, known as DJ Bobo
- Bertrand Bitz (born 1978), singer and songwriter
- Daniel Boemle (1960–2007), DJ and radio personality
- Urs Bühler (born 1971), tenor, member of Il Divo
- Dominik Burkhalter (born 1975), bandleader, composer, drummer
- Caroline Charrière (1960–2018), composer, flautist, choir director, educator
- Michel Corboz (1934–2021), conductor
- Claudia D'Addio, pop musician, Eurovision Song Contest 2006 and MusicStars contestant
- Rachel Kolly d'Alba (born 1981), solo violinist
- Emile Jaques-Dalcroze (1865–1950), musician, educator, developer of Eurhythmics
- Philippe Decourroux (born 1962), Christian singer and drummer
- Henri Dès (born 1940), singer and songwriter
- Andy Egert (born 1961), blues guitarist, singer and songwriter
- Electroboy (born 1974), electronic music producer
- Edwin Fischer (1886–1960), pianist and conductor
- Thomas Gabriel Fischer (born 1963), Celtic Frost guitarist, singer
- Peter Giger (born 1939), percussionist and bandleader
- Peter-Lukas Graf (1929–2025), flautist and conductor
- Ernst Haefliger (1919–2007), tenor
- Heinz Holliger (born 1939), oboist
- Arthur Honegger (1892–1955), composer
- Philippe Huttenlocher (born 1942), bass
- Rahel Indermaur, (born 1980) opera singer
- Christian Jacob (born 1958), jazz pianist
- Michael Jarrell (born 1958), composer
- Daniel Kandlbauer (born 1983), pop musician and MusicStars contestant
- Kuno Lauener (born 1961), lead singer of Bernese rock band Züri West
- Carlos Leal (born 1969), rapper and actor; best known as a member of the hip-hop group Sens Unik
- Pepe Lienhard (born 1939), band leader and saxophone player
- Frank Martin (1890–1974), composer

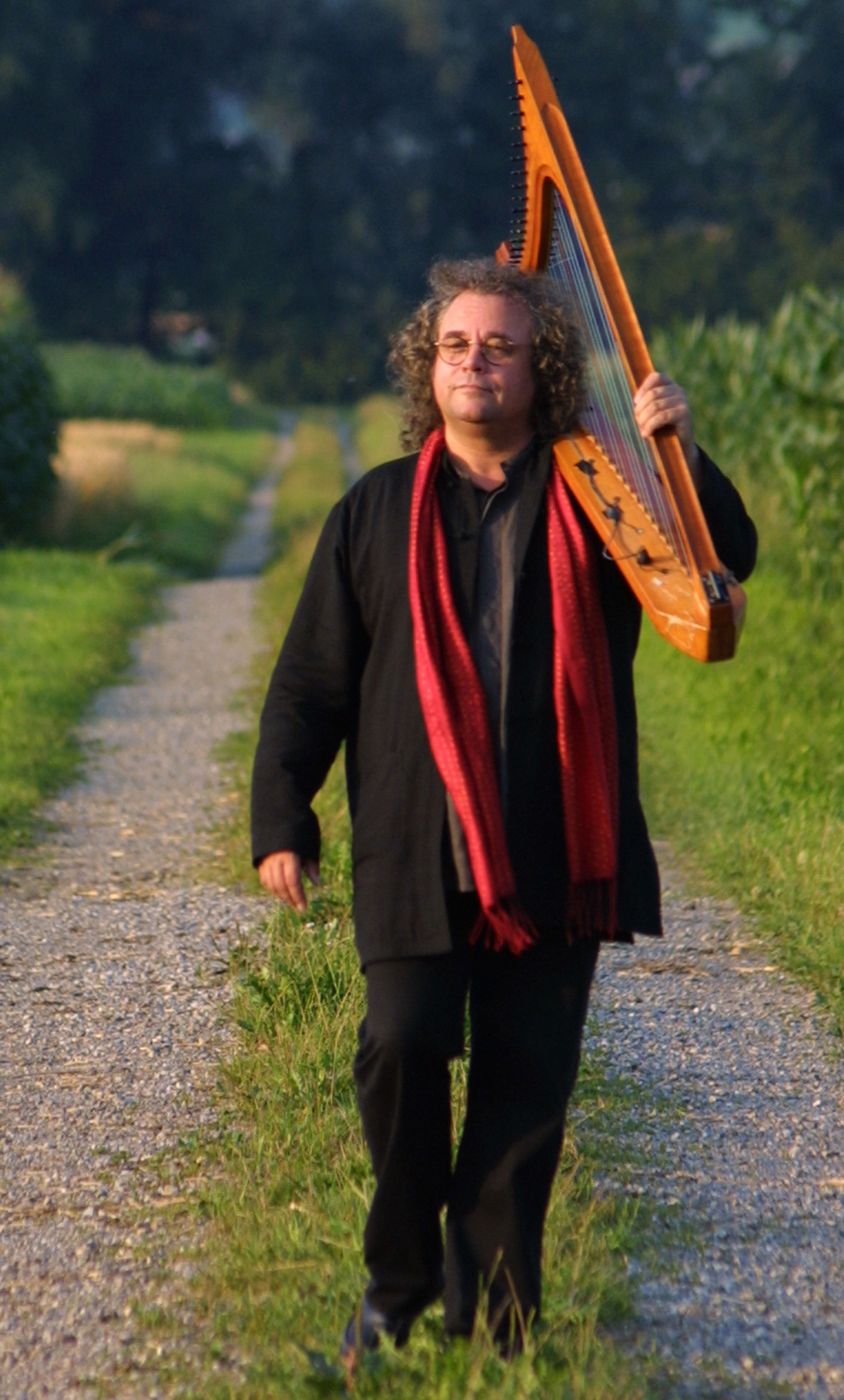
Andreas Vollenweider

- Mani Matter (1936–1972), singer
- Jojo Mayer (born 1963), drummer
- Dieter Meier (born 1945), singer of electronica band Yello, which had hits "Oh Yeah" and "The Race"
- Mandy Meyer (born 1960), guitarist, played in bands Asia, Gotthard and Krokus
- Patrick Moraz (born 1948), keyboardist with Yes and Moody Blues
- Paolo Pandolfo, violist (viola da gamba)
- Zlatko Perica (born 1969), better known as "Slädu", played guitar in bands as Tangerine Dream or Gölä
- Carlos Perón (born 1952), producer and former singer of electronica band Yello
- Werner Reinhart (1884–1951), industrialist, philanthropist, music and literature patron
- Othmar Schoeck (1886–1957), composer
- Ludwig Senfl (1486–1542/3), Renaissance composer
- Marc Storace (born 1951), Maltese-Swiss rock vocalist and songwriter; best known as singer of hard rock band Krokus
- Éric Tappy (1931–2024), tenor
- Martin Tillman (born 1964), film music composer
- Tina Turner (1939–2023), became Swiss in 2013
- Silvio Varviso (1924–2006), conductor, especially of opera
- Andreas Vollenweider (born 1953), Grammy award-winning harpist
- Chris von Rohr (born 1951), musician and producer; best known as bassist of hard rock band Krokus
- August Wenzinger (1905–1996), cellist, violist (viola da gamba), pioneer of early music performance
- Luzia von Wyl (born 1985), composer and pianist
- Roland Zoss (born 1951), rock poetry musician
- Alberich Zwyssig (1808–1854), priest, composer of the Swiss Psalm
- YRU, rock band formed in 2006

- Nemo (born 1999), singer-rapper, violinist, pianist, drummer; Eurovision 2024 winner

== Philosophy ==
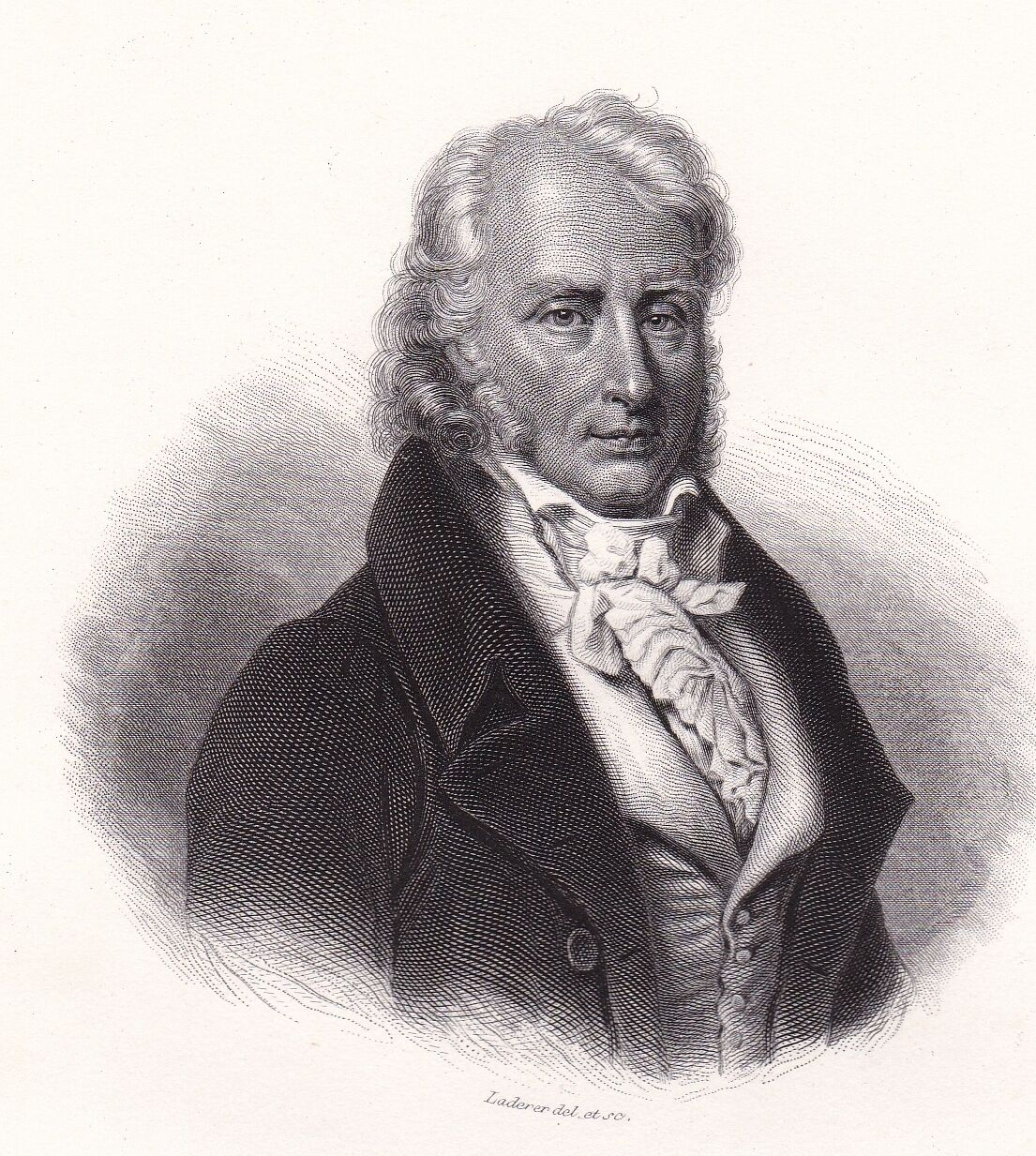
Benjamin Constant

- Henri Frédéric Amiel (1821–1881), philosopher and poet
- Richard Avenarius (1843–1896), formulated the radical positivist doctrine of "empirical criticism"
- Peter Bieri (1944–2023), philosopher, author
- Benjamin Constant (1767–1830)
- Jeanne Hersch (1910–2000), philosopher
- Henri Lauener (1933–2002), philosopher

- Dominik Perler (born 1965), philosopher
- Hans A. Pestalozzi (1929–2004), social critic
- Jean-Jacques Rousseau (1712–1778), philosopher (Geneva)
- Alexandru Șafran (1910–2006), rabbi and philosopher

== Psychology and pedology ==
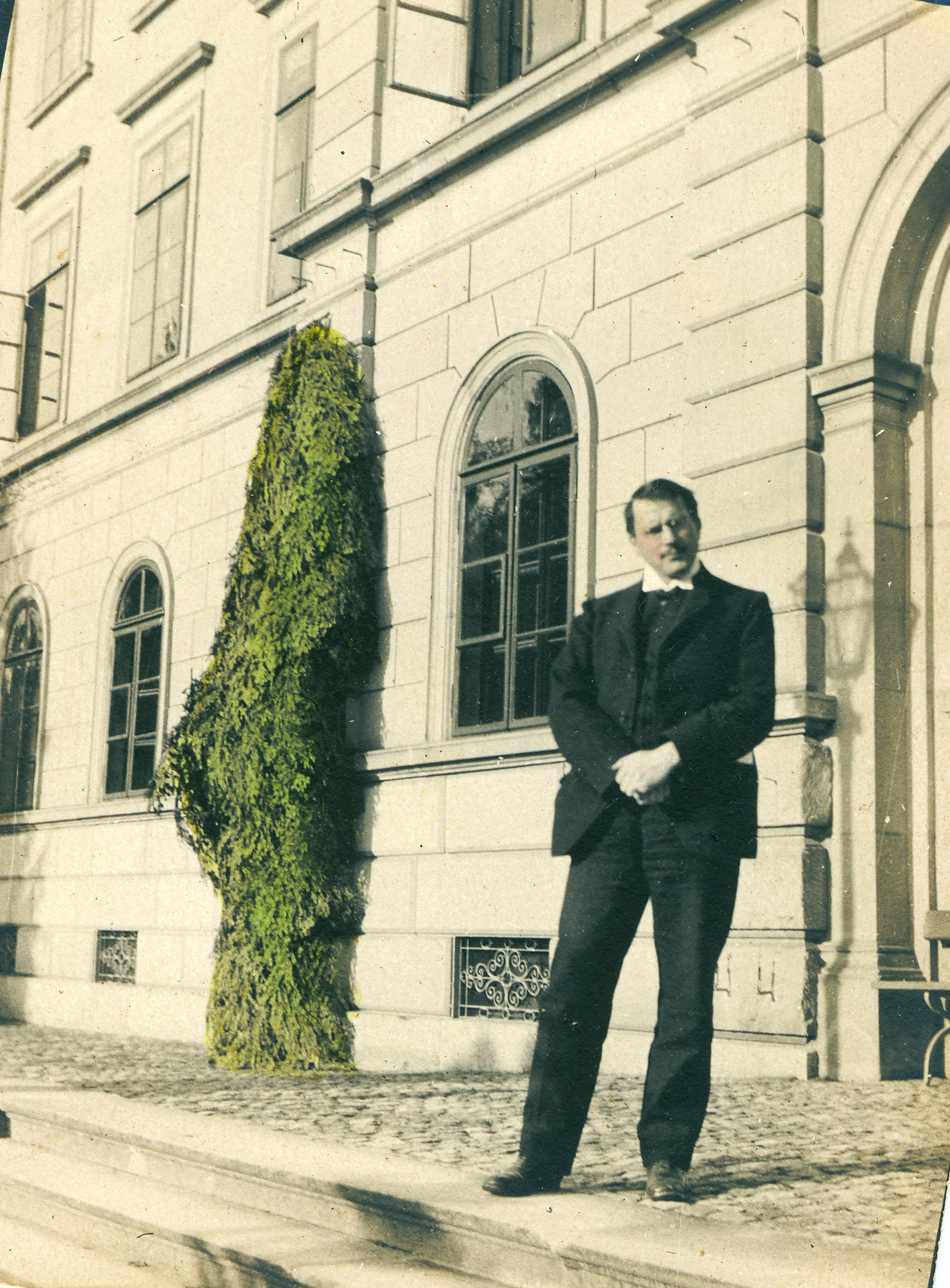
Carl Jung

- Peter Baumann (1935–2011), psychiatrist
- Ludwig Binswanger (1881–1966), psychologist
- Eugen Bleuler (1857–1940), psychiatrist
- Carl Gustav Jung (1875–1961), founder of analytical psychology
- Emma Jung (1882–1955), psychoanalyst and author

- Elisabeth Kübler-Ross (1926–2004), psychiatrist, pioneer in near-death studies
- Max Lüscher (1923–2017), inventor of the Lüscher color test
- Richard Meili (1900–1991), psychologist
- Johann Heinrich Pestalozzi (1746–1827), pedagogue
- Oskar Pfister (1873–1956), psychologist and pastor
- Jean Piaget (1896–1980), psychologist
- Hermann Rorschach (1884–1922), psychiatrist and psychoanalyst

== Politics ==
See also:

- List of 2005 office-holders in Switzerland
- List of Federal Chancellors of Switzerland (since 1803)
- List of the first female holders of political offices: Switzerland
- List of mayors of Aarau, Altstätten, Arbon, Baden, Basel, Bellinzona, Bern, Biel/Bienne, Brig, Brig-Glis, Bulle, Burgdorf, Carouge, Chur, Davos, Delémont, Frauenfeld, Fribourg, Geneva, Grenchen, Herisau, Köniz, Kreuzlingen, La Chaux-de-Fonds, La Tour-de-Peilz, Lausanne, Le Châtelard, Les Planches, Liestal, Locarno, Lucerne, Lugano, Martigny, Montreux, Morges, Murten, Naters, Neuchâtel, Nyon, Olten, Rapperswil-Jona, Rheinfelden, Schaffhausen, Sierre, Sion, Solothurn, St. Gallen, Thun, Trimbach, Uster, Vevey, Wädenswil, Wil, Winterthur, Yverdon, Zofingen, Zug, Zürich
- List of members of the Swiss Council of States (current)
- List of members of the Swiss Federal Council (since 1848)
- List of members of the Swiss National Council (current)
- List of officials of the Helvetic Republic (1798–1803)
- List of presidents of the Swiss Confederation (since 1848)
- List of presidents of the Swiss Council of States (since 1848)
- List of presidents of the Swiss Diet (before 1848)
- List of presidents of the Swiss National Council (since 1848)

== Religion ==
- Jakob Abbadie (1654–1727), Protestant preacher
- Gilberto Agustoni (1922–2017), cardinal
- Jacob Amman (1644–?)
- Karl Barth (1886–1968), theologian
- Heinrich Bullinger (1504–1575), reformer in Zürich
- Greti Caprez-Roffler (1906–1994), Swiss pastor.
- Georges Cottier (1922–2016), cardinal, theologian
- Niklaus Manuel Deutsch (1484–1530), painter, dramatician, politician and reformer in Bern
- Johann Augustanus Faber (c.1470–c.1530), theologian and historian
- William Farel (1489–1565), reformer in Lausanne
- Theodosius Florentini (1808–1865)
- Gaston Frommel (1862–1906)
- Berchtold Haller (1492–1536), reformer in Bern
- Karl Rudolf Hagenbach (1801–1874)
- Johann Jakob Herzog (1805–1882)
- Hans Küng (1928–2021), theologian

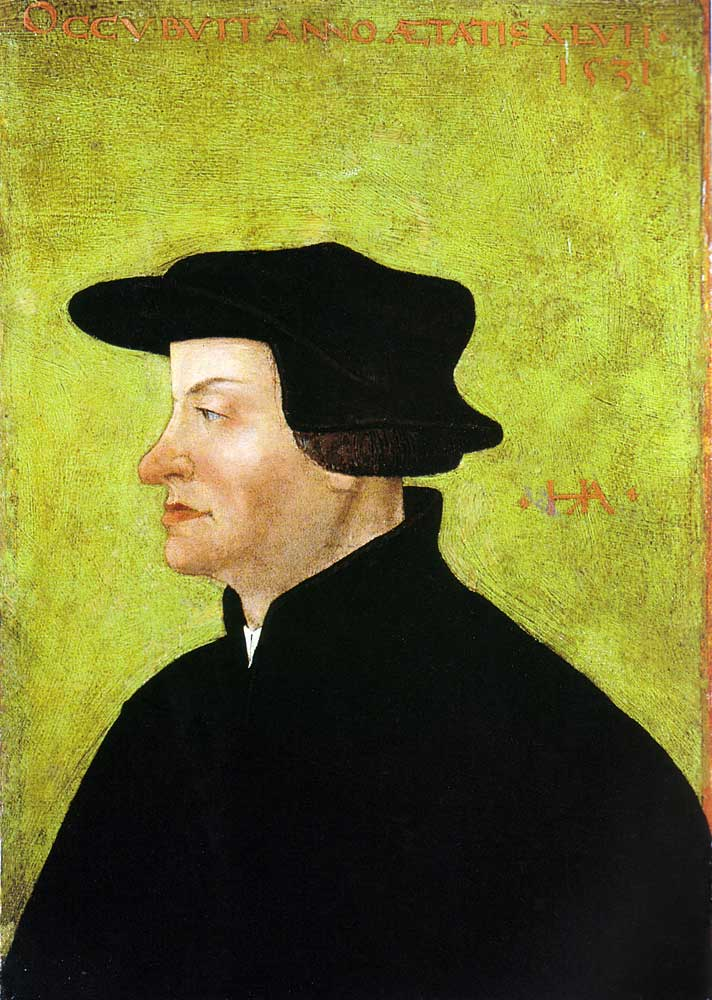
Huldrych Zwingli

- Johann Kaspar Lavater (1741–1801), pastor and physiognomist
- Oswald Myconius (1488–1552)
- Johannes Oecolampadius (1482–1531), reformer in Basel
- Frère Roger (1915–2005), founder of Taizé
- Philip Schaff (1819–1893)
- Henri Schwery (1932–2021), cardinal, former Bishop of Sion
- Erika Sutter, medical missionary to South Africa
- Clemens Thoma (1932–2011)
- Alexandre Rodolphe Vinet (1797–1847), theologian and critic
- Pierre Viret (1511–1571), reformer in Vaud Canton
- Lukas Vischer (1926–2008), theologian and writer
- Johann Jakob Wettstein (1693–1754), theologian
- John Joachim Zubly (Hans Joachim Züblin) (1724–1781), pastor, delegate to the Continental Congress
- Huldrych Zwingli (1484–1531), reformer in Zürich

== Science ==
=== A–F ===
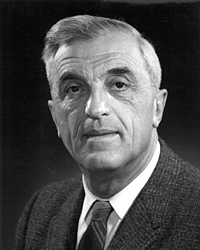
Felix Bloch

- Alexander Emanuel Agassiz (1835–1910), American man of science
- Louis Agassiz (1807–1873), did work on ice ages, glaciers
- Jacob Amsler (1823–1912), mathematician and inventor of measuring instruments
- Werner Arber (born 1929), 1978 Nobel Prize in Physiology or Medicine
- Marie-Isabelle Archinard (1903–1995), physicist, student of Marie Curie
- Johann Georg Baiter (1801–1877), philologist
- Adolph Francis Alphonse Bandelier (1840–1914), archaeologist
- Jean-François Bergier (1931–2009), historian
- Eugen Bleuler (1857–1940), psychiatrist
- Felix Bloch (1905–1983), 1952 Nobel Prize in Physics
- Hans Bluntschli (1877–1962), anatomist
- Charles Bonnet (1720–1793), botanist
- Daniel Bovet (born 1907–1992), 1957 Nobel Prize in Physiology or Medicine

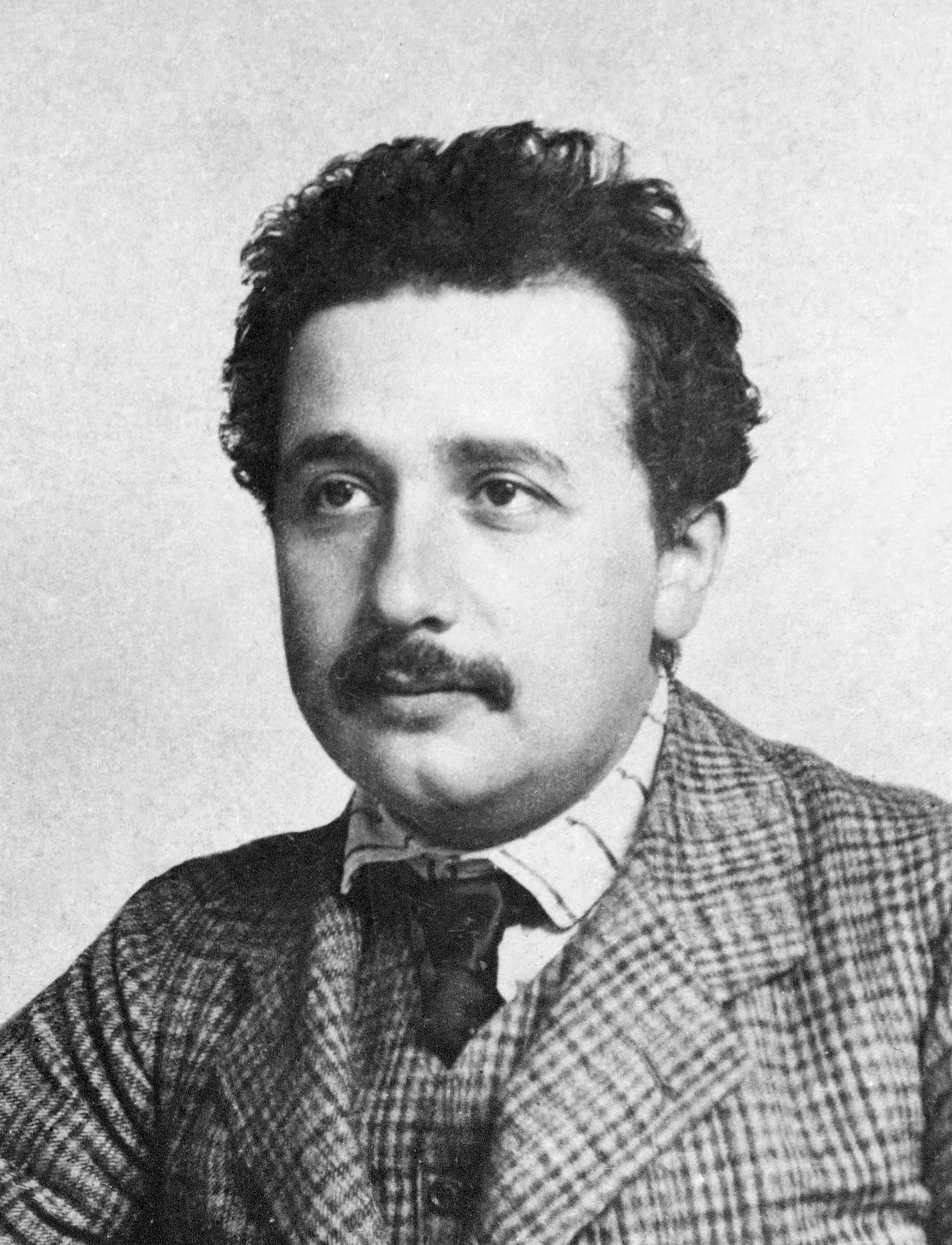
Albert Einstein

- Joost Bürgi (1552–1632), mathematician and watchmaker
- Johann Büttikofer (1850–1929), zoologist
- Jean-André Deluc (1727–1817), geologist
- Paul Dirac (1902–1984), physicist
- Albert Einstein (1879–1955), 1921 Nobel Prize in Physics
- Richard R. Ernst (1933–2021), 1991 Nobel Prize in Chemistry
- Edmond H. Fischer (1920–2021), 1992 Nobel Prize in Physiology or Medicine
- Fritz Fischer (1898–1947), physicist
- Auguste Forel (1848–1931), myrmecologist, psychiatrist, neurologist
- François-Alphonse Forel (1841–1912), pioneer in the study of lakes
- Johann Kaspar Füssli (1743–1786), entomologist

=== G–O ===
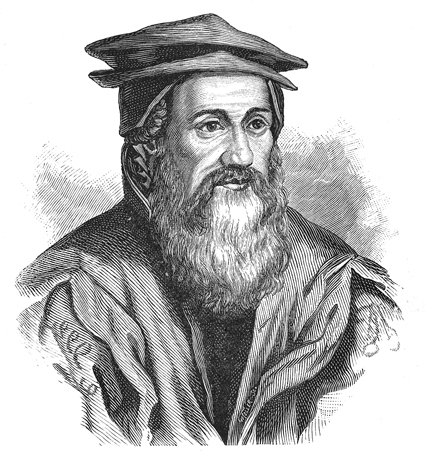
Conrad Gessner

- Victor Gautier (1824–1890), physician
- Conrad Gessner (1516–1565)
- Christoph Glauser (born 1964), social scientist and entrepreneur
- Jules Gonin (1870–1935), ophthalmologist
- Gustav Guanella (1909–1982), electronics engineer, inventor
- André Guignard (born 1942), engineer
- Charles-Edouard Guillaume (1861–1938), 1920 Nobel Prize in Physics
- Patric Hagmann, physician in diagnostic neuroradiology at Centre Hospitalier Universitaire Vaudois (CHUV), coined the term (Connectome)
- Albrecht von Haller (1708–1777)
- Walter Hess (1881–1973), 1949 Nobel Prize in Physiology or Medicine
- Carl Hilty (1833–1909), jurist
- Albert Hofmann (1906–2008), chemist, discoverer of d-lysergic acid diethylamide (LSD)
- Eugen Huber (1849–1923), jurist
- François Huber (1750–1831), naturalist
- Otto Frederick Hunziker (1873–1959), dairy professor and technical innovator

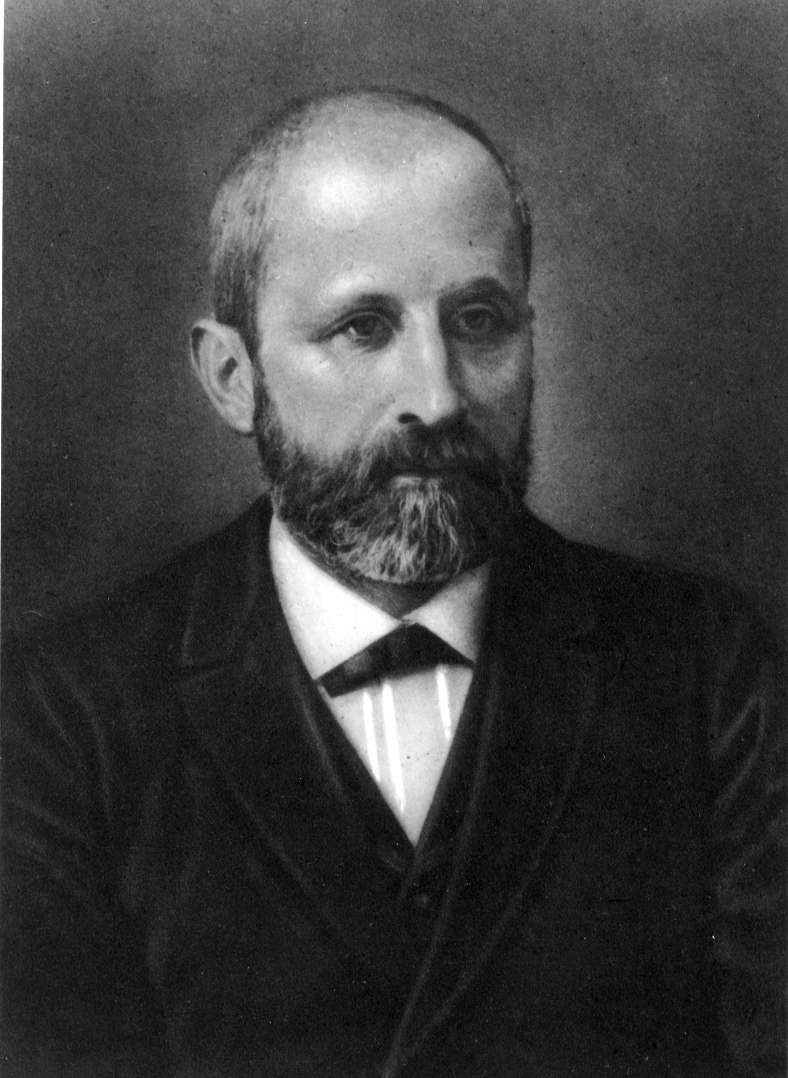
Friedrich Miescher

- Stefan Janos (born 1943), low temperature physicist
- Paul Karrer (1889–1971), 1937 Nobel Prize in Chemistry
- Emil Theodor Kocher (1841–1917), 1909 Nobel Prize in Physiology or Medicine
- Jean Charles Galissard de Marignac (1817–1894), chemist
- Jean-François Mayer (born 1957), religious historian
- Michel Mayor (born 1942), astronomer
- Friedrich Miescher (1844–1895), physician and biologist, discovered DNA
- Johannes von Müller (1752–1809), historian
- K. Alex Müller (1927–2023), 1987 Nobel Prize in Physics
- Paul Müller (1899–1965), 1948 Nobel Prize in Physiology or Medicine
- Jean-Daniel Nicoud (born 1938), computer scientist and researcher
- Johann Caspar von Orelli (1787–1849)

=== P–Z ===
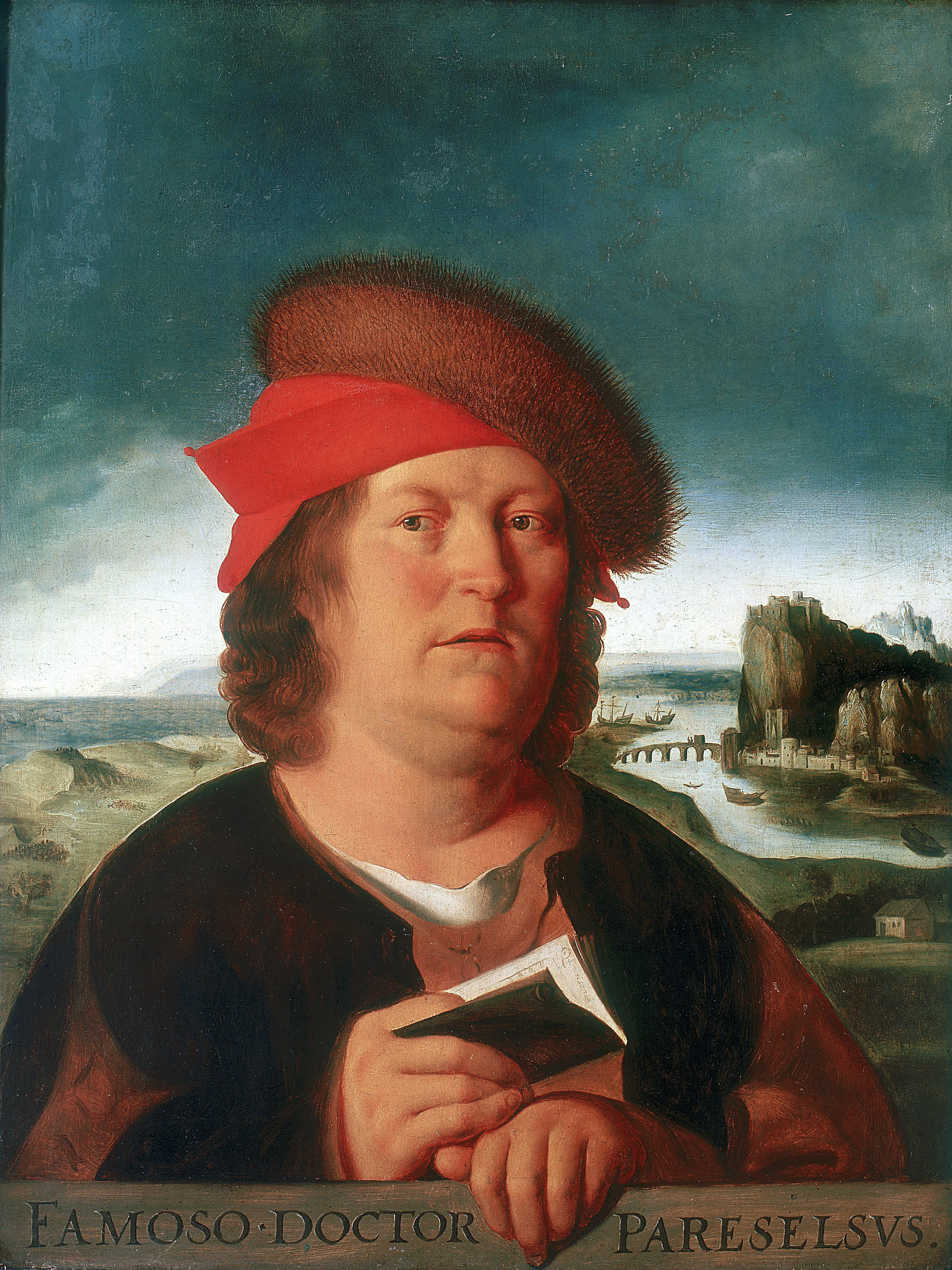
Paracelsus

- Paracelsus (1493–1541) (Theophrastus Bombastus von Hohenheim), alchemist
- Wolfgang Pauli (1900–1958), 1945 Nobel Prize in Physics
- Jean Piaget (1896–1980), psychologist
- Auguste Piccard (1884–1962), physicist and balloonist
- Bertrand Piccard (born 1958), psychiatrist and balloonist
- Jacques Piccard (1922–2008), engineer and underwater explorer
- Jean Piccard (1884–1963), balloonist
- François-Jules Pictet de la Rive (1809–1872), zoologist and paleontologist
- Raoul Pictet (1846–1929), physicist
- Adolf Portmann (1897–1982), zoologist
- Vladimir Prelog (1906–1998), 1975 Nobel Prize in Chemistry
- Didier Queloz (born 1966), astronomer
- Tadeus Reichstein (1897–1996), chemist, 1950 Nobel Prize in Physiology or Medicine
- Eugene Renevier (1831–1906), geologist
- Heinrich Rohrer (1933–2013), 1986 Nobel Prize in Physics
- Heinz Rutishauser (1918–1970), mathematician, computer software pioneer

- Leopold Ružička (1887–1976), 1939 Nobel Prize in Chemistry
- Johann Jakob Scheuchzer (1672–1733), Swiss savant
- Louis Secretan (1758–1839), mycologist
- Jack Steinberger (1921–2020), 1988 Nobel Prize in Physics
- Ernst Stueckelberg (1905–1984), theoretical physicist
- Markus Wenk (born 1969), biochemist and academic
- Alfred Werner (1866–1919), 1913 Nobel Prize in Chemistry
- Niklaus Wirth (1934–2024), computer scientist, Turing Award winner, inventor of the Pascal programming language
- Germaine Marie Wiswald (1891–1988), engineer
- Kurt Wüthrich (born 1938), 2002 Nobel Prize in Chemistry
- Daniel Albert Wyttenbach (1746–1820)
- Alexandre Yersin (1863–1943), physician, isolated the Yersinia pestis
- Rolf M. Zinkernagel (born 1944), 1996 Nobel Prize in Physiology or Medicine
- Fritz Zwicky (1898–1974), astronomer
- Theodor Zwinger (1533–1588), scholar

== Sports ==
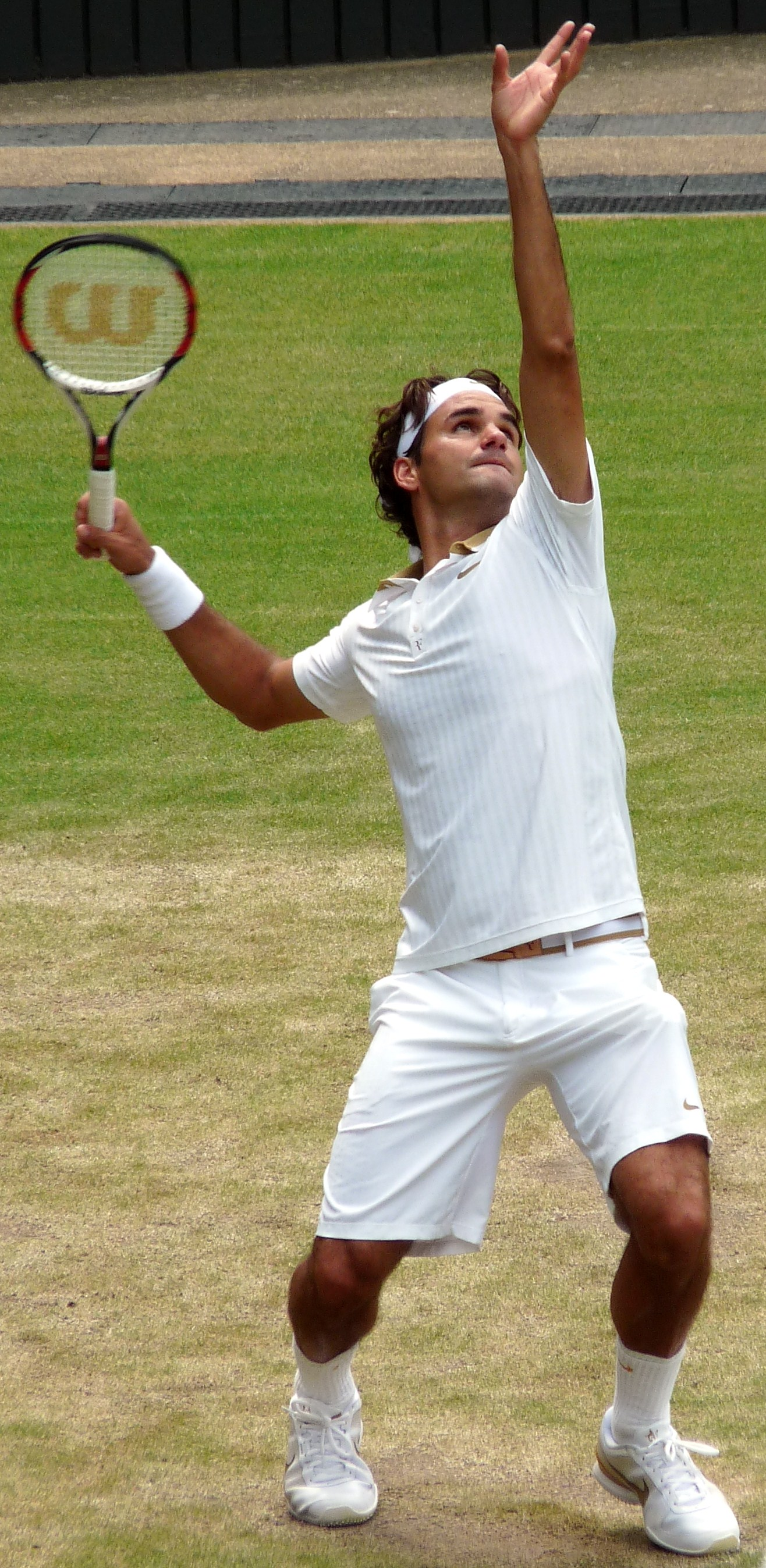
Roger Federer

- Paul Accola (born 1967), skiing champion
- David Aebischer (born 1978), former National Hockey League goaltender
- Jeff Agoos (born 1968), Swiss-born American soccer defender
- Daniel Albrecht (born 1983), alpine skier
- Simon Ammann (born 1981), gold medallist in ski jumping at the 2002 Winter Olympics, ski jumping at the 2010 Winter Olympics
- Manuel Bachmann (born 1975), footballer
- Timea Bacsinszky (born 1989), tennis player
- Sven Bärtschi (born 1992), National Hockey League player for the Vancouver Canucks
- Madeleine Berthod (born 1931), 1956 gold medallist in downhill skiing
- Denise Biellmann (born 1962), world champion figure skater
- Sepp Blatter (born 1935), FIFA president
- Sébastien Buemi (born 1988), Formula One driver
- Clint Capela (born 1994), NBA player for the Houston Rockets
- Ursula Bruhin (born 1970), snowboarder
- Fabian Cancellara (born 1981), cyclist
- Claudio Castagnoli (born 1980), pro wrestler
- Stéphane Chapuisat (born 1969), footballer
- Dario Cologna (born 1986), cross-country skiing champion
- Didier Cuche (born 1974), alpine skier
- Didier Défago, (born 1977), alpine skier
- Johan Djourou (born 1987), footballer
- Oscar Egg (1890–1961), cyclist
- Roger Federer (born 1981), tennis champion: 20-time Grand Slam singles champion
- Michela Figini (born 1966), alpine skiing champion
- Marcel Fischer (born 1978), fencing champion, gold medallist in Athens Olympics
- Alexander Frei (born 1979), footballer
- Tanja Frieden (born 1976), snowboarder
- Martin Gerber (born 1974), NHL goaltender for the Ottawa Senators

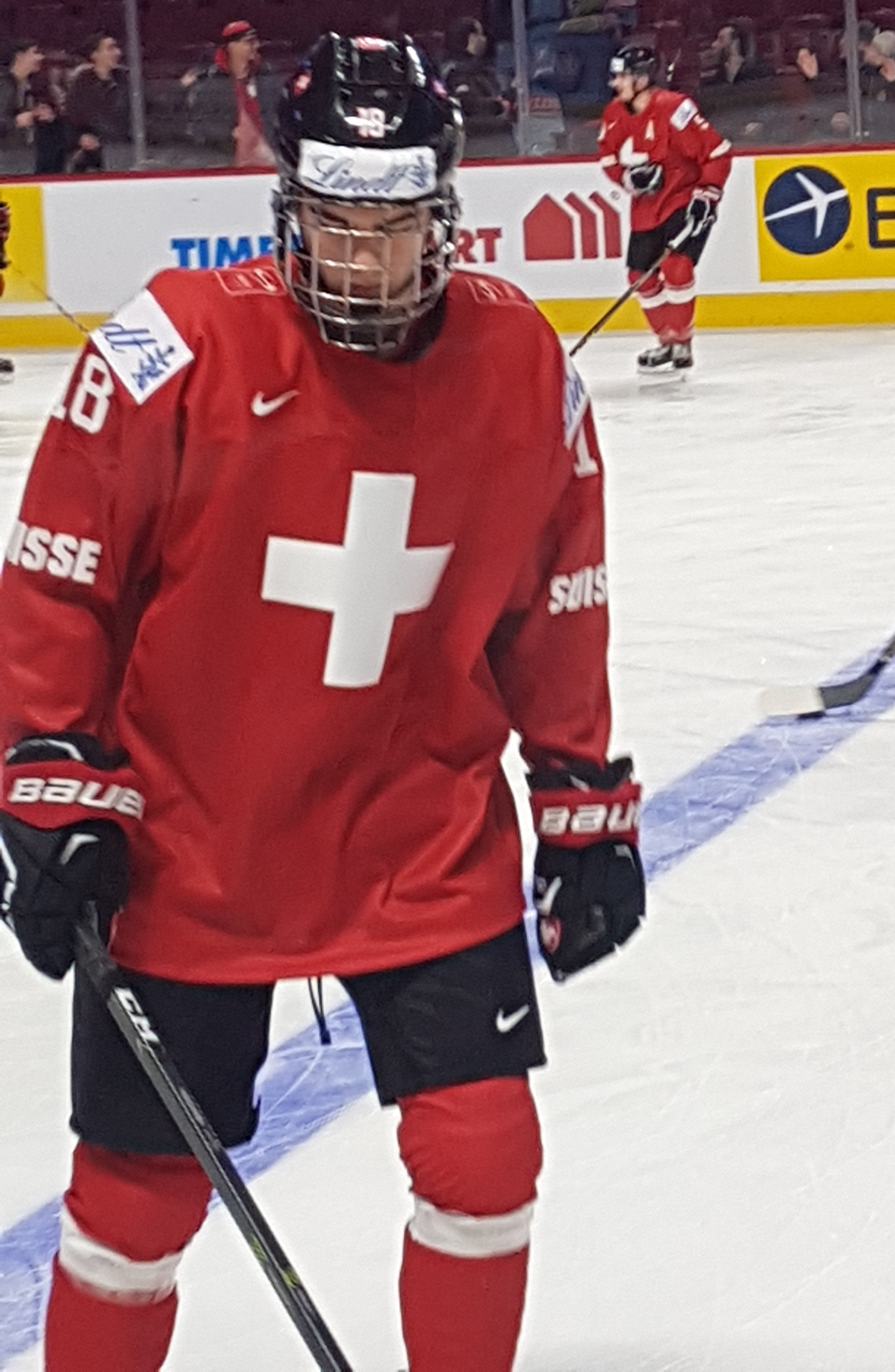
Nico Hischier

- Arnold Gerschwiler (1914–2003), skater
- Hans Gerschwiler (1920), world champion figure skater
- Jack Gerschwiler (1898–2000), coach
- Stefan Grogg (born 1974), ice hockey player
- Franz Heinzer (born 1962), alpine skier
- Stéphane Henchoz (born 1974), footballer
- Erika Hess (born 1962), alpine skiing champion
- Martina Hingis (born 1980), tennis champion; five-time Grand Slam singles champion
- Nico Hischier (born 1999), NHL forward for the New Jersey Devils; first Swiss player to be drafted #1 overall in the NHL entry draft
- Jakob Hlasek (born 1964), tennis player
- Ambrosi Hoffmann (born 1977), alpine skiing medalist
- Andy Hug (1964–2000), karate and kickboxing champion
- Benjamin Huggel (born 1977), professional footballer
- Patrick Hürlimann (born 1963), Olympic curling champion
- Roman Josi (born 1990), NHL defenseman for the Nashville Predators
- Natan Jurkovitz (born 1995), French-Swiss basketball player

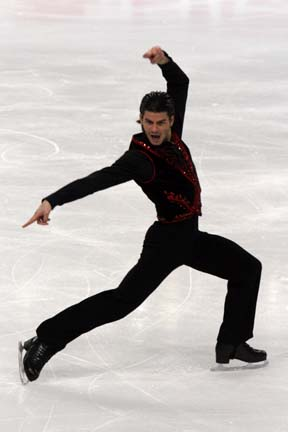
Stéphane Lambiel

- Bruno Kernen (born 1961), alpine skier, winner of the 1983 Kitzbühel downhill race
- Bruno Kernen (born 1972), alpine skier, bronze medalist and former world champion in downhill
- Hugo Koblet (1925–1964), cycling champion
- Franz Krienbühl (1929–2002), speed skater
- Ferdy Kübler (1919–2016), cycling champion
- Andreas Küttel (born 1979), ski jumper
- Stéphane Lambiel (born 1985), figure skater, Olympic silver medalist
- Peter Lüscher (born 1956), alpine skiing champion
- Daniela Meuli (born 1981), snowboarder
- Lise-Marie Morerod (born 1956), alpine skiing champion
- Nicolas Müller (born 1982), snowboarder
- Peter Müller (born 1957), alpine skiing champion
- Xeno Müller (born 1972), rower, Olympic gold medalist
- Marie-Theres Nadig (born 1954), alpine skiing champion
- Sonja Nef (born 1972), alpine skiing champion
- Kaanu Olaniyi (born 1998), professional basketball player
- Maya Pedersen (born 1972), skeleton athlete
- Manuela Pesko (born 1978), snowboarder
- Alina Popa (born 1978), IFBB professional bodybuilder
- Walter Prager (1910–1984), alpine skiing champion
- Cheyenne Rechsteiner (born 1994), wheel gymnast
- Clay Regazzoni (1939–2006), racing driver
- Corinne Rey-Bellet (1972–2006), alpine skier
- Tony Rominger (born 1961), cyclist who won major tours four times in his career
- Marc Rosset (born 1970), tennis player, gold medallist in Barcelona Olympics
- Bernhard Russi (born 1948), alpine skiing champion
- Martina Schild (born 1981), downhill skiing champion
- Hedy Schlunegger (1923–2003), downhill Olympic champion of 1948
- Olivier Schmutz (born 1971), judoka
- Vreni Schneider (born 1964), alpine skiing champion
- Patty Schnyder (born 1978), professional tennis player
- Thabo Sefolosha (born 1984), NBA player for the Oklahoma City Thunder
- Philippe Senderos (born 1985), footballer
- Xherdan Shaqiri (born 1991), professional footballer
- Jo Siffert (1936–1971), racing driver
- Mark Streit (born 1977), NHL defenceman for the Philadelphia Flyers
- Marc Surer (born 1951), racing driver
- Alain Sutter (born 1968), footballer
- Kubilay Türkyilmaz (born 1967), footballer
- Maria Walliser (born 1963), alpine skiing champion
- Stanislas Wawrinka (born 1985), professional tennis player
- Jean Wicki (1933–2003), gold medallist in bobsleigh
- Granit Xhaka (born 1992), footballer
- Hakan Yakin (born 1977), footballer
- Murat Yakin (born 1974), footballer
- Heidi Zurbriggen (born 1967), skier
- Matthias Zurbriggen (1856–1917), mountain guide and alpinist
- Pirmin Zurbriggen (born 1963), alpine skiing champion
- Silvan Zurbriggen (born 1981), skier
- Lara Gut-Behrami (born 1991), skier

== Legendary and folk heroes ==
- Helvetia, personification ("mother") of Switzerland
- Arnold von Melchtal, legendary founding father of Switzerland
- Ueli Rotach, legendary hero of the 1405 battle at Stoss

- William Tell, legendary 14th-century hero
- Arnold von Winkelried, legendary hero of the 1386 battle of Sempach

== Others ==
- Sarah, Crown Princess of Brunei (born 1987), wife of Crown Prince Al-Muhtadee Billah, half Swiss and half Bruneian
- Othmar Ammann (1879–1965), civil engineer, bridge engineer to the New York Port Authority
- Nick Auf der Maur (1942–1998), Canadian journalist, Swiss parents
- Louise Bachofen-Burckhardt (1845–1920), art collector
- Alfred Baur (1865–1951), businessman and art collector
- Maximilian Bircher-Benner (1867–1939), physician and Muesli inventor
- Johann Georg Bodmer (1786–1864), inventor
- Johann Jakob Bodmer (1698–1783)
- Hans Ormund Bringolf (1876–1951), adventurer and autobiographer
- Jacob Burckhardt (1818–1897), art historian
- Johann Ludwig Burckhardt (1784–1814), traveller and orientalist
- Michée Chauderon (died 1652), the last person to be executed for sorcery in Geneva
- Arthur Cohn (born 1927), film producer, received six Oscars
- Kadie Karen Diekmeyer (born 1965), Canadian vegan activist and Internet personality, known online as That Vegan Teacher.
- Lydia Welti-Escher (1858–1891), Swiss patron of the arts and founder of the Gottfried Keller Stiftung
- Philipp Emanuel von Fellenberg (1771–1844)
- Peter Friederich (born 1942), diplomat and money launderer
- Susanna Gossweiler (1740–1793), Swiss educator
- Marie Grossholtz (1761–1850), known as Madame Tussaud
- Paul Grueninger (1891–1972), commander of police and humanitarian
- Felix Hemmerlin (1388/9 – c. 1460), theologian
- Michelle Hunziker (born 1977), TV presenter previously married to the Italian singer Eros Ramazzotti

- Ingvar Kamprad (1926–2018), founder of IKEA, Swiss resident 1976–2014
- Carl Lutz (1895–1975), diplomat and humanitarian
- Robert Maillart (1872–1940), civil engineer, inventor of many concrete bridge techniques
- Peter Hildebrand Meienberg (1929–2021), missionary
- Christoph Meili (born 1968), whistle-blower
- Christian Menn (1927–2018), civil engineer
- Max Miedinger (1910–1980), typeface designer, inventor of Helvetica
- Claude Nobs (1936–2013), founder and general manager of the Montreux Jazz Festival
- Susanna Orelli-Rinderknecht (1845–1939), temperance activist
- Urs Pedraita, motorcyclist and adventurer
- Ernest Prodolliet (1905–1984), diplomat
- Rosa Rein (1897–2010), oldest living Swiss (as of 2010)
- Werner Reinhart (1884–1951), philanthropist, music and literature patron
- Archibald Reiss (1875–1929), criminologist
- Beat Richner (1947–2018), pediatrician, founder of children's hospitals in Cambodia
- Niklaus Riggenbach (1817–1899), engineer
- Frithjof Schuon (1907–1998), Sufi writer, born in Basel
- Victor Snell (1874–1931), journalist
- John Sutter (1803–1880), California settler
- Stefi Talman (born 1958), shoe designer
- Alain Tanner (1929–2022), film director
- Lukas Vischer (1780–1840), collector, traveler, artist

== See also ==
- List of Germans
- List of mountains of Switzerland named after people
- Lists of people by nationality - for other lists of people by nationality, ethnicity, citizenship, language, or location
- Swiss longevity recordholders
