= Richard Meili =

Swiss psychologist (1900–1991)

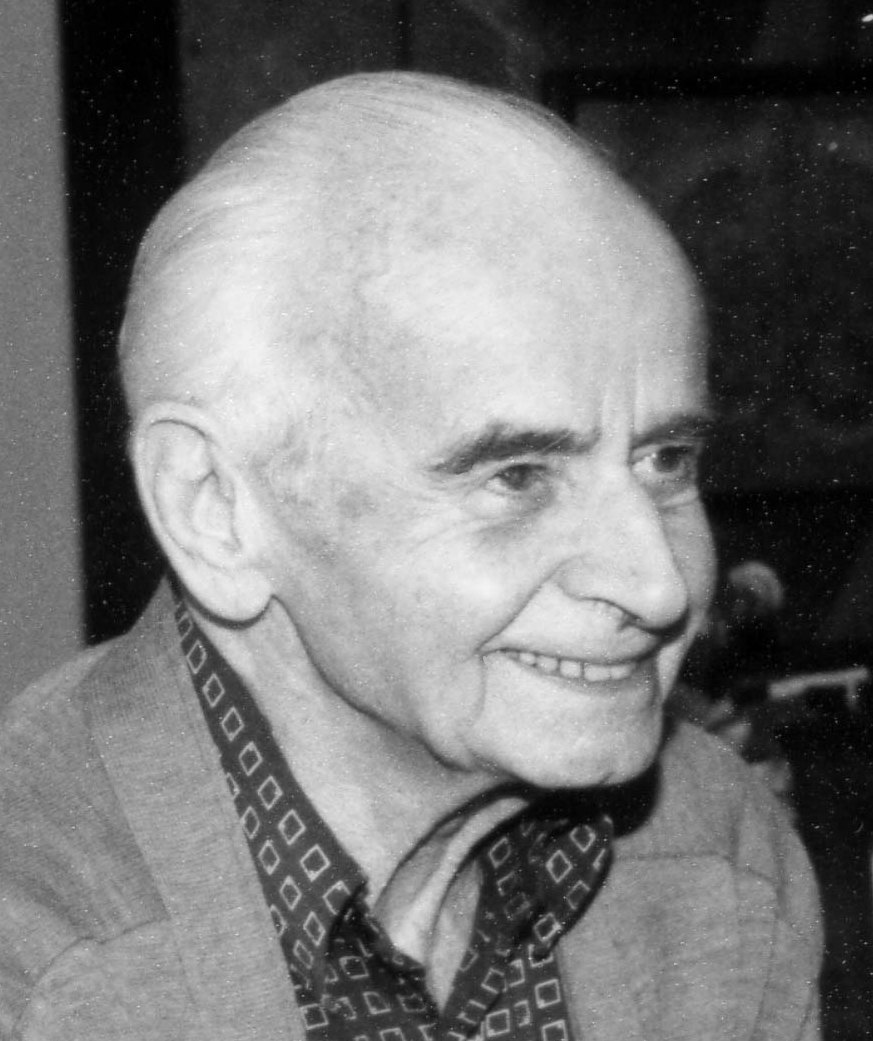
- Born: February 28, 1900; Schaffhausen, Switzerland
- Died: July 5, 1991 (aged 91); Gümligen near Bern, Switzerland
- Known for: Book on diagnostics, successor of Piaget in Geneva

Academic background
- Education: University of Bern (Switzerland)

Academic work
- Discipline: Gestalt psychology
- Institutions: Jena, Berlin, Geneva, Winterthur, Bern
- Main interests: Practical psychology, diagnostics, personality development and intelligencefactors

Richard Meili (February 28, 1900 - July 5, 1991) was an internationally renowned scientist in practical psychology, diagnostics, personality development and intelligence.

== Biography ==
Meili studied at the University of Jena, University of Bern and University of Berlin. In Berlin he was a student of Wolfgang Köhler and Kurt Lewin, (both of them proponents of Gestalt psychology) and also of Hans Rupp, professor for applied psychology at the institute of psychology.

From 1926 to 1941 he was an assistant at the Institute J.J. Rousseau of Geneva University. Under Edouard Claparède he qualified as a lecturer with his paper Recherches sur les formes de l'intelligence (research on forms of intelligence) and became the successor of Jean Piaget.

From 1942 to 1948 he was director of the Institute of Vocational Counseling in Winterthur, Switzerland.

In 1949 Meili was appointed as head of the new Psychology Department at the University of Bern. His main fields of interest were diagnostics, problem solving, personality development, remedial teaching and intelligence.

In 1953 he founded the Psychological Institute of Bern University where he lectured until his retirement in 1970.

== Main publications ==
- Einführung in die psychologische Diagnostik (Introduction to Psychological Testing) 1937 (also in French)
- Analytischer Intelligenztest, AIT, (Analytical Test of Intelligence) 1966
- Die Struktur der Intelligenz, (The Structure of Intelligence)1981
- Anfänge der Charakterentwicklung, (Early Personality Development)1957
- Grundlagen der individuellen Persönlichkeitsunterschiede, (Basics of Personality Traits) 1972
