= Carl Durheim =

Swiss lithographer and photographer

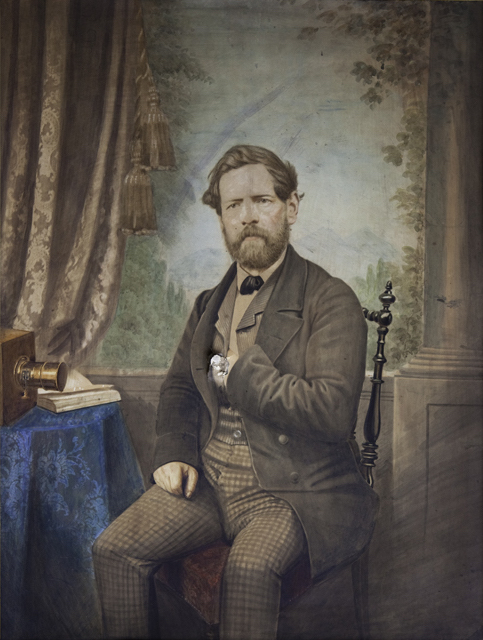
Self-portrait of Carl Durheim next to a camera on the table (circa 1850), hand-colored calotype

Carl Durheim, also known as Karl Durheim and Charles Durheim, (23 November 1810 – 30 January 1890) was a Swiss lithographer and an early photographer. He began working with daguerreotype in 1845 and changed to a paper printing process in 1849. In 1850, he became the first Swiss photographer to offer paper prints. Between 1852 and 1853 Durheim created a series of photos of itinerants for the Swiss police, which is the earliest remaining collection of police photography. Durheim produced many portraits of seated individuals.

Durheim was born in Bern, Switzerland. He died there on 30 January 1890.

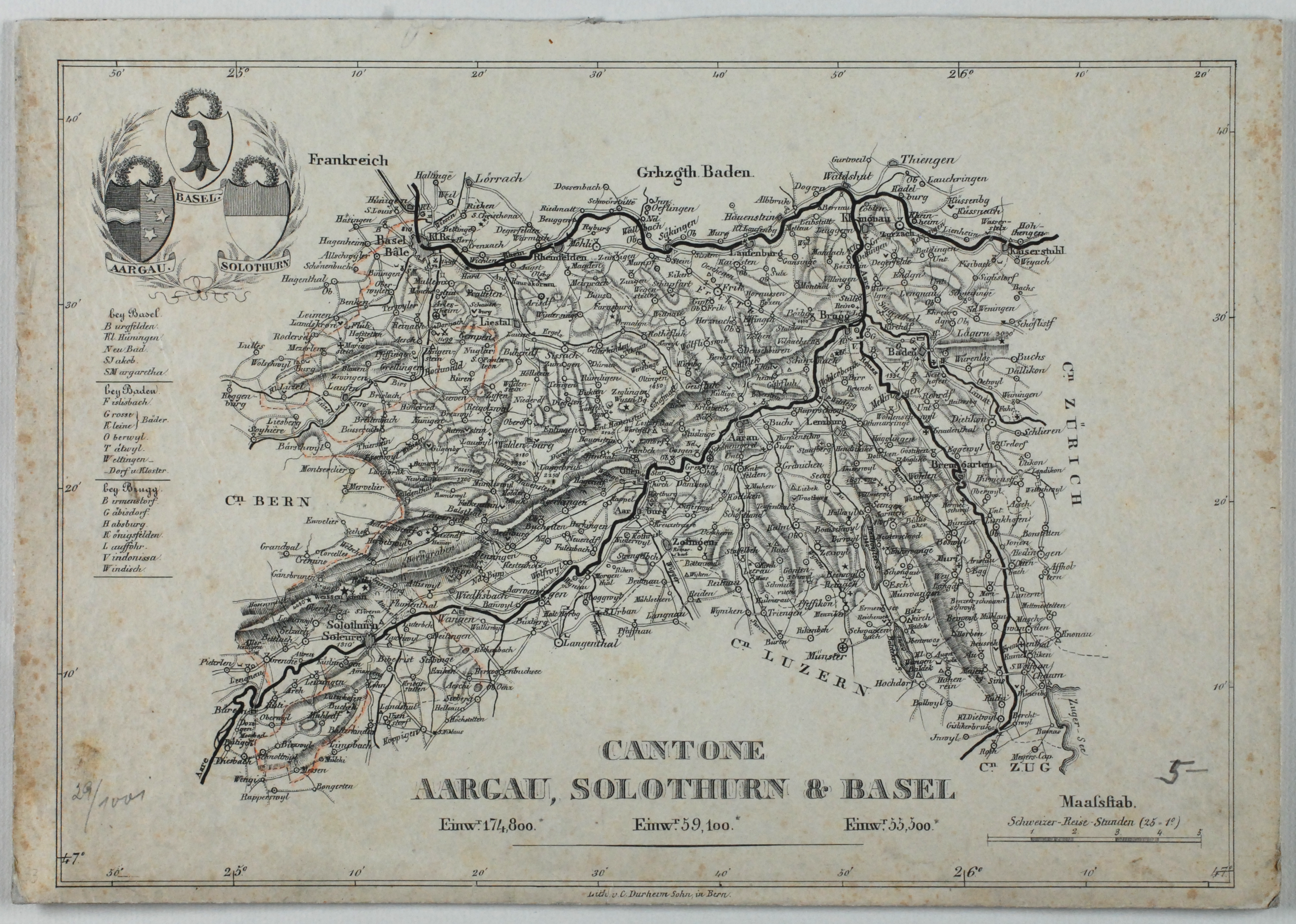
Lithograph of the Aargau, Solothurn, & Basel canton

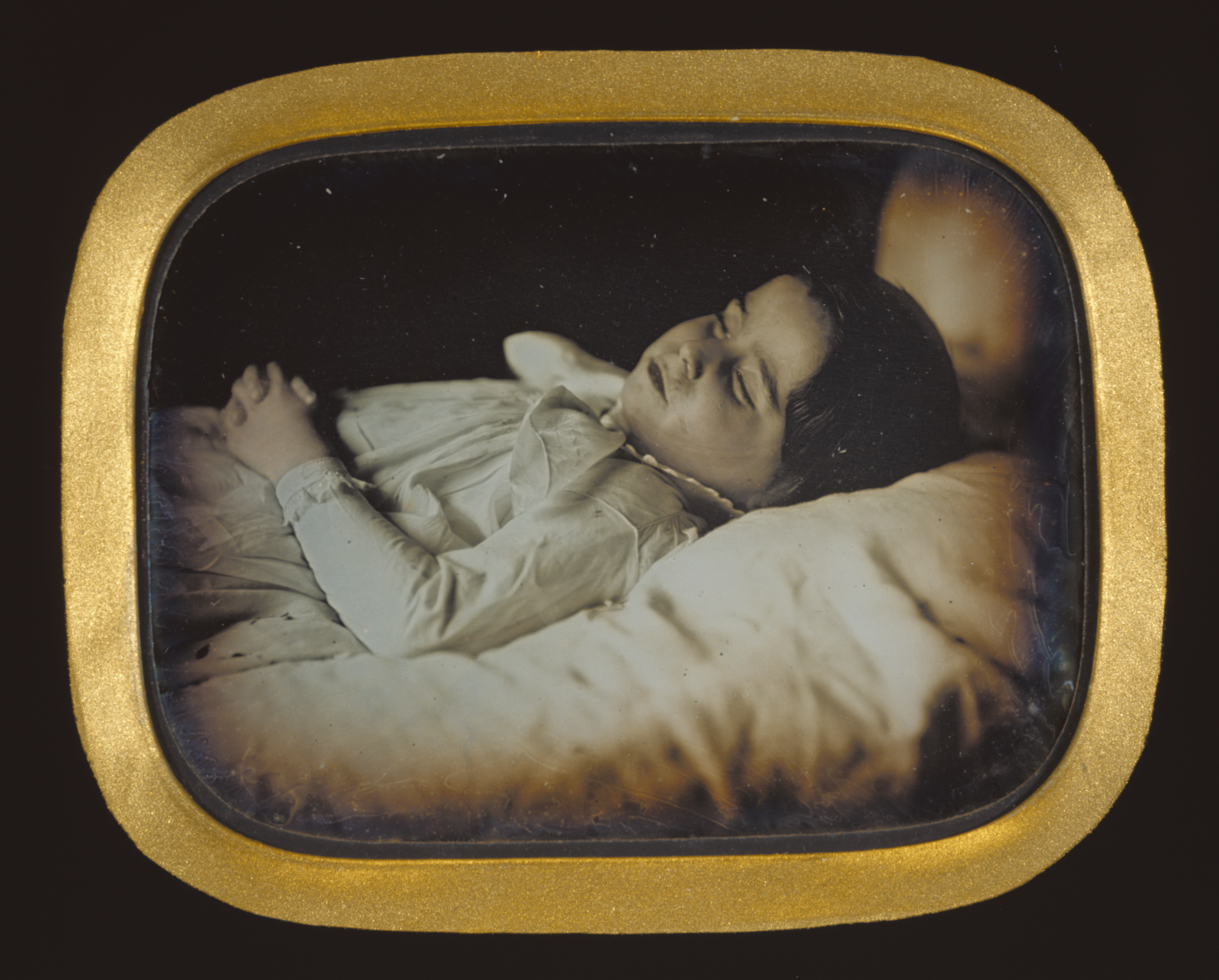
Postmortem of a Child, hand-colored daguerreotype (circa 1852)

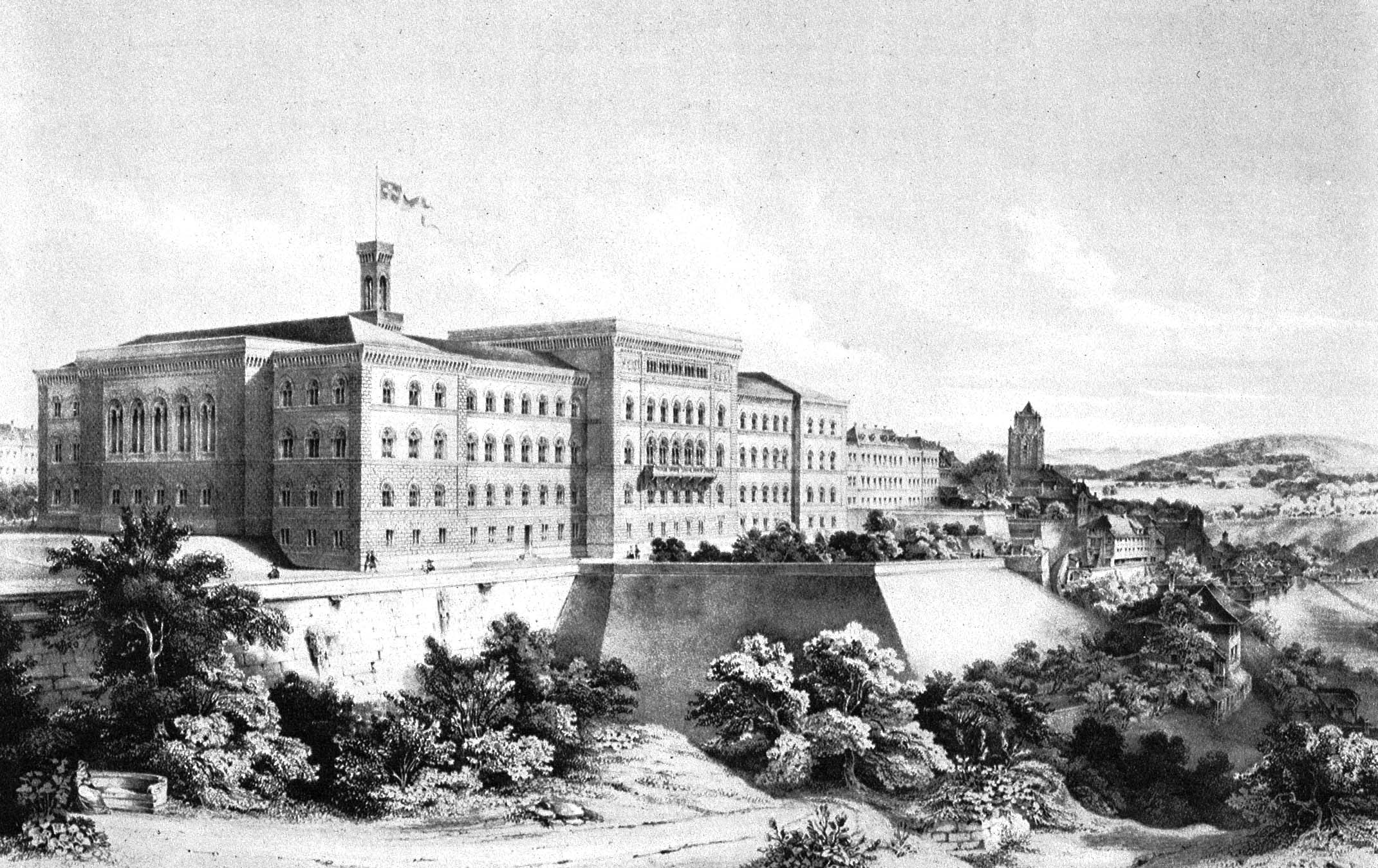
Lithograph of the first Federal Palace in Bern, built 1852–57, now the west wing of the Federal Palace.

Joseph Körbler photographic portrait
