= List of mayors of Thun =

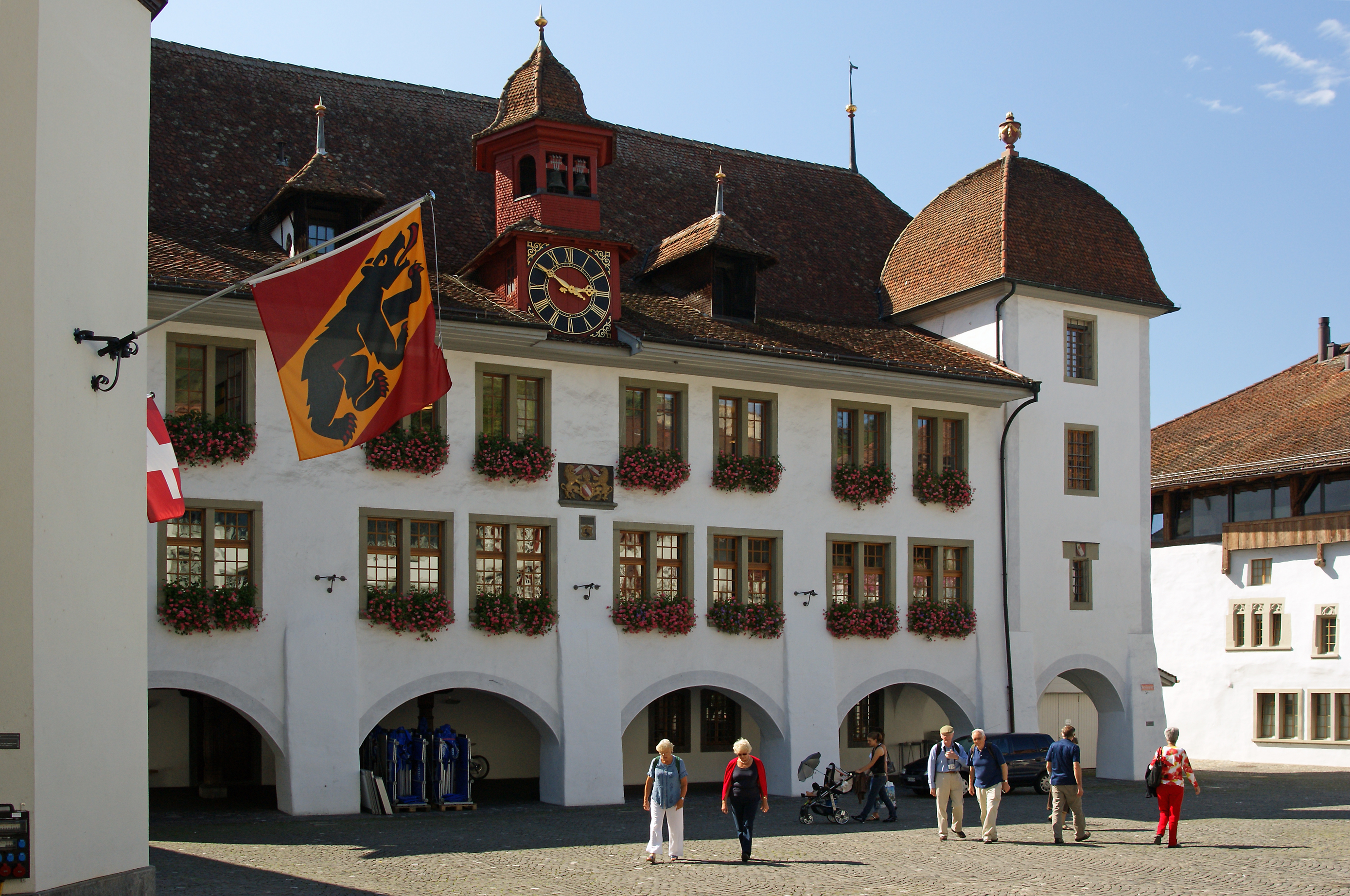
Rathaus Thun

Coat of arms of Thun

This is a list of mayors of the city of Thun, Switzerland.

Mayor (Stadtpräsident) of Thun
Term	Mayor	Lifespan	Party	Notes
1899–1909	Emil Lohner	(1865–1959)		
1910-1919	Unknown	(Unknown)		
1919–1926	Paul Kunz	(1886–1967)	FDP/PRD	
1927–1938	Eduard Amstutz	(1873–1965)	FDP/PRD	
1939–1952	Paul Kunz	(1886–1967)	FDP/PRD	
1952–1970	Emil Baumgartner	(1905–1977)	FDP/PRD	
1971–1990	Ernst Eggenberg	(1931–1996)	SPS/PSS	
1991–2010	Hans-Ueli von Allmen	(born 1946)	SPS/PSS	
2011–present	Raphael Lanz	(born 1968)	SVP/UDC	
