= Marius Lacombe =

Swiss mathematician

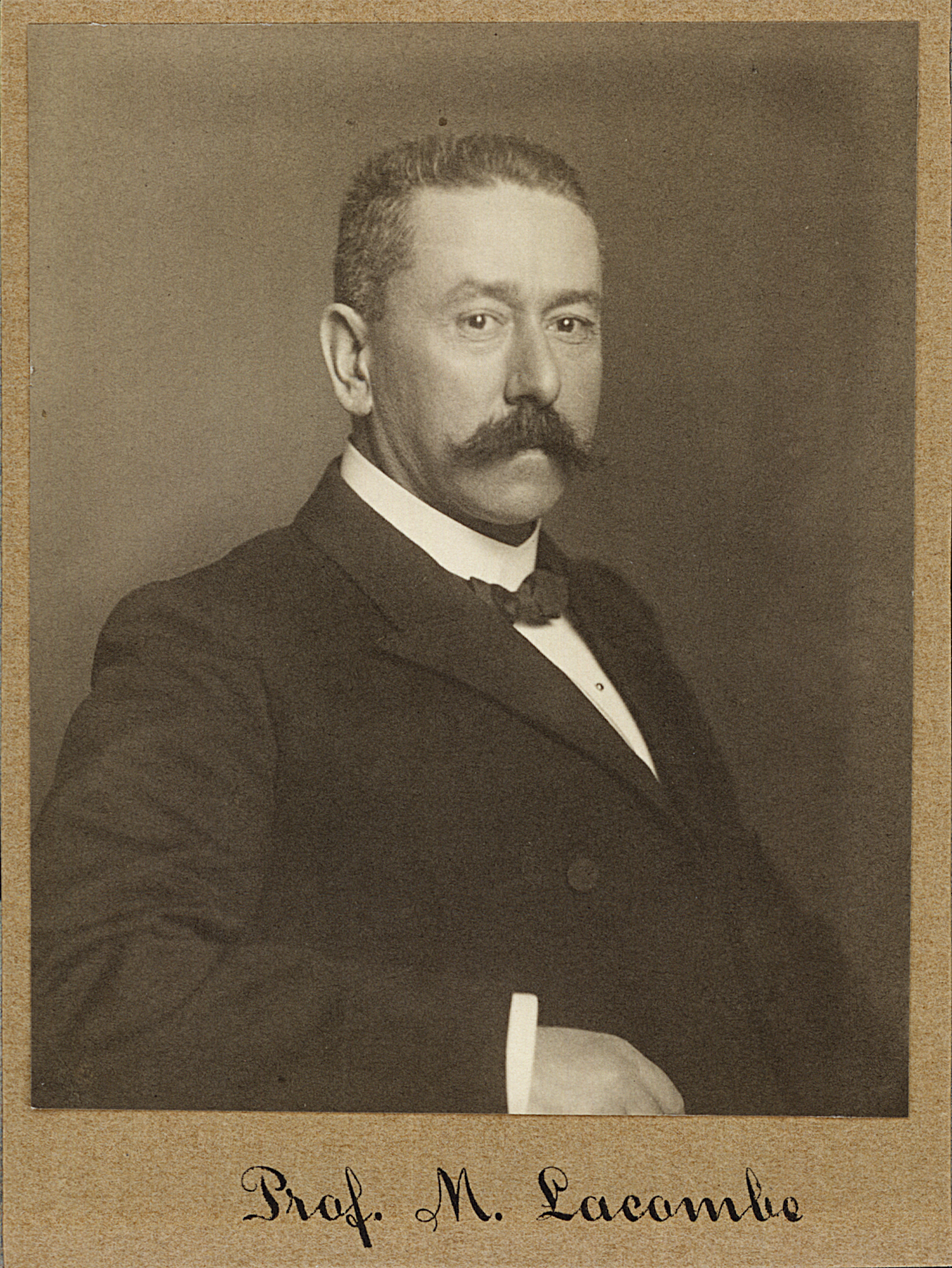
- Born: 7 February 1862; Begnins, Canton of Vaud, Switzerland
- Died: 19 March 1938 (aged 76); Chexbres, Canton of Vaud, Switzerland
- Education: ETH Zurich
- Scientific career
- Fields: Mathematics
- Workplaces: ETH Zurich; University of Lausanne

Marius Lacombe (7 February 1862 – 19 March 1938) was a Swiss mathematician.

== Life and work ==
Lacombe studied mathematics at Engineers Department of the ETH Zurich. From 1890 to 1894 he was teaching descriptive geometry in the university of Lausanne. In 1894 he was appointed professor at ETH Zurich to fill a newly created chair of descriptive geometry in French language. After fourteen years in Zurich, in 1908 he returned to university of Lausane, where he retired in 1927.

He was more a teacher than a researcher. His only known works deal on pedagogy of mathematics. In 1896 he was one of the organizers of the first International Congress of Mathematicians.

== Bibliography ==
- Eminger, Stefanie Ursula (2015). Carl Friedrich Geiser and Ferdinand Rudio: The Men Behind the First International Congress of Mathematicians (PDF). St Andrews University.
- Frei, Günther; Stammbach, Urs (1994). Die Mathematiker an den Zürcher Hochschulen (in German). Springer. ISBN 978-3-7643-5078-9.
- Khouyibaba, Saadia (1997). Mathématiques et Mathématiciens dans les universités de la Suisse Romande de 1537 a 1937 (PDF) (in French). Université Laval. ISBN 0-612-25426-7.
- Oswald, Nicola; Volkert, Klaus (2018). "A Glimpse of Sources for Historical Studies at the ETH Archive in Zürich". EMS Newsletter. 49 (109): 28–33. doi:10.4171/NEWS/109/7. ISSN 1726-7528.
