= List of mayors of Yverdon =

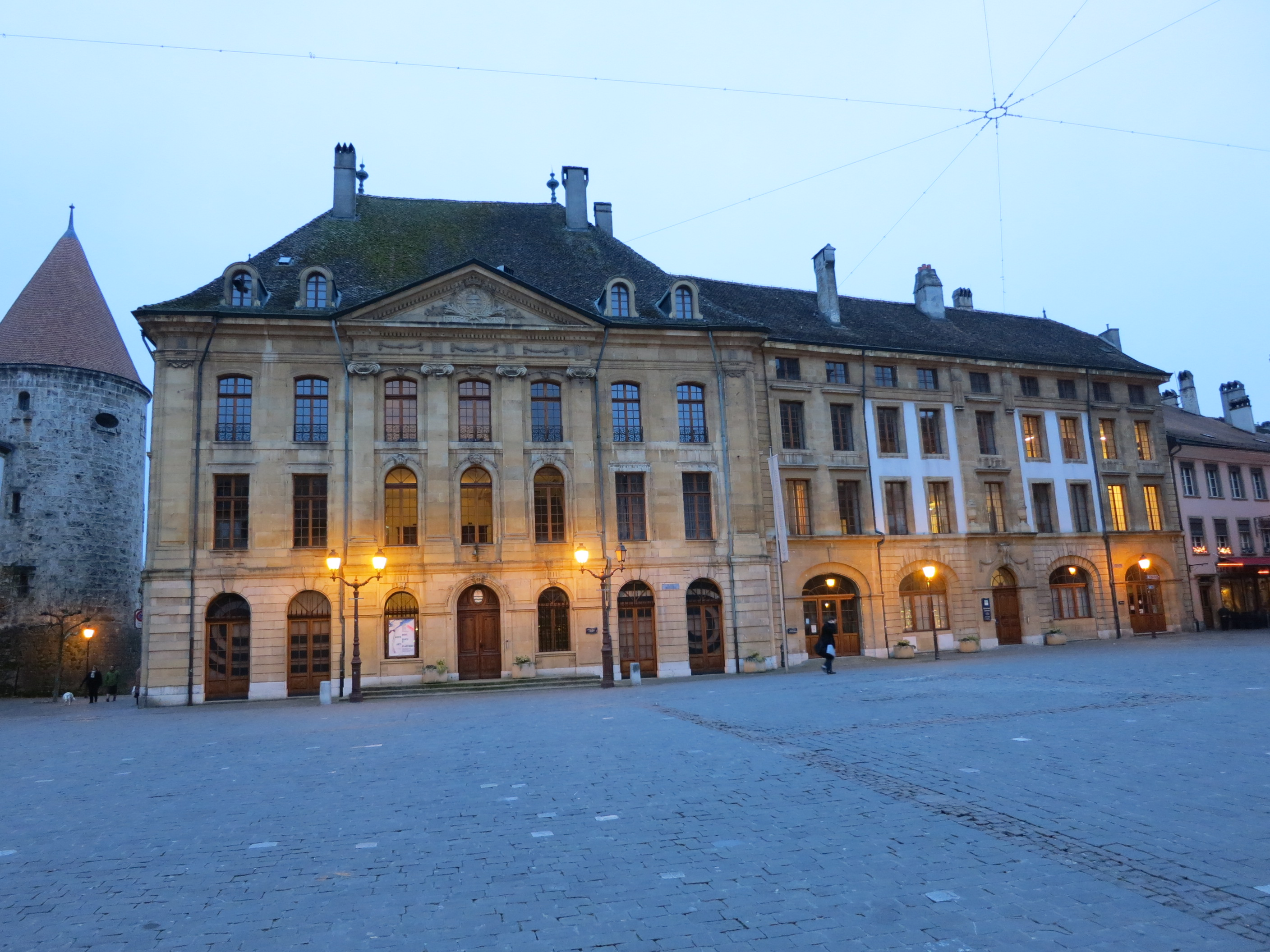
Hôtel-de-Ville, Yverdon-les-Bains

Coat of arms of Yverdon

This is a list of mayors of Yverdon-les-Bains, Vaud, Switzerland. The mayor (syndic) of Yverdon-les-Bains chairs the seven-member municipal council (Municipalité).

Mayor (syndic) of Yverdon
Term	Mayor	Lifespan	Party	Notes
1889–1902	Emile Paillard	(1853–1914)	PRD/FDP	
1902–1905	Charles Perret-Ogiz	(1829–1912)	PLS/LPS	
1906–1909	John Landry	(1849–1926)	PLS/LPS	
1910–1916	Maurice du Bois de Dunilac	(1866–1945)	PLS/LPS	
1916–1919	Charles Bujard	(1857–1920)	PLS/LPS	
1919–1933	Charles Vodoz	(1860–1939)	PLS/LPS	
1934–1945	Ulysee Péclard	(1886–1977)	PRD/FDP	
1946–1953	Léon Jacquier	(1896–1955)	PSS/SPS	
1954–1968	André Martin	(1912–1995)	PRD/FDP	
1968–1973	Edmond Pache	(1918–2005)	PRD/FDP	
1974–1982	Pierre Duvoisin	(born 1943)	PSS/SPS	
1982–1989	André Perret	(born 1947)	PSS/SPS	
1990–1993	Raymond Guyaz	(born 1943)	PRD/FDP	
1994–2001	Olivier Kernen	(born 1960)	PSS/SPS	
2002–2009	Rémy Jaquier	(born 1952)	PRD/FDP	
2009–2014	Daniel von Siebenthal	(born 1960)	PSS/SPS	
2015–2021	Jean-Daniel Carrard	(born 1958)	PLR/FDP	
2021–present	Pierre Dessemontet	(born 1969)	PSS/SPS	
