= List of mayors of Nyon =

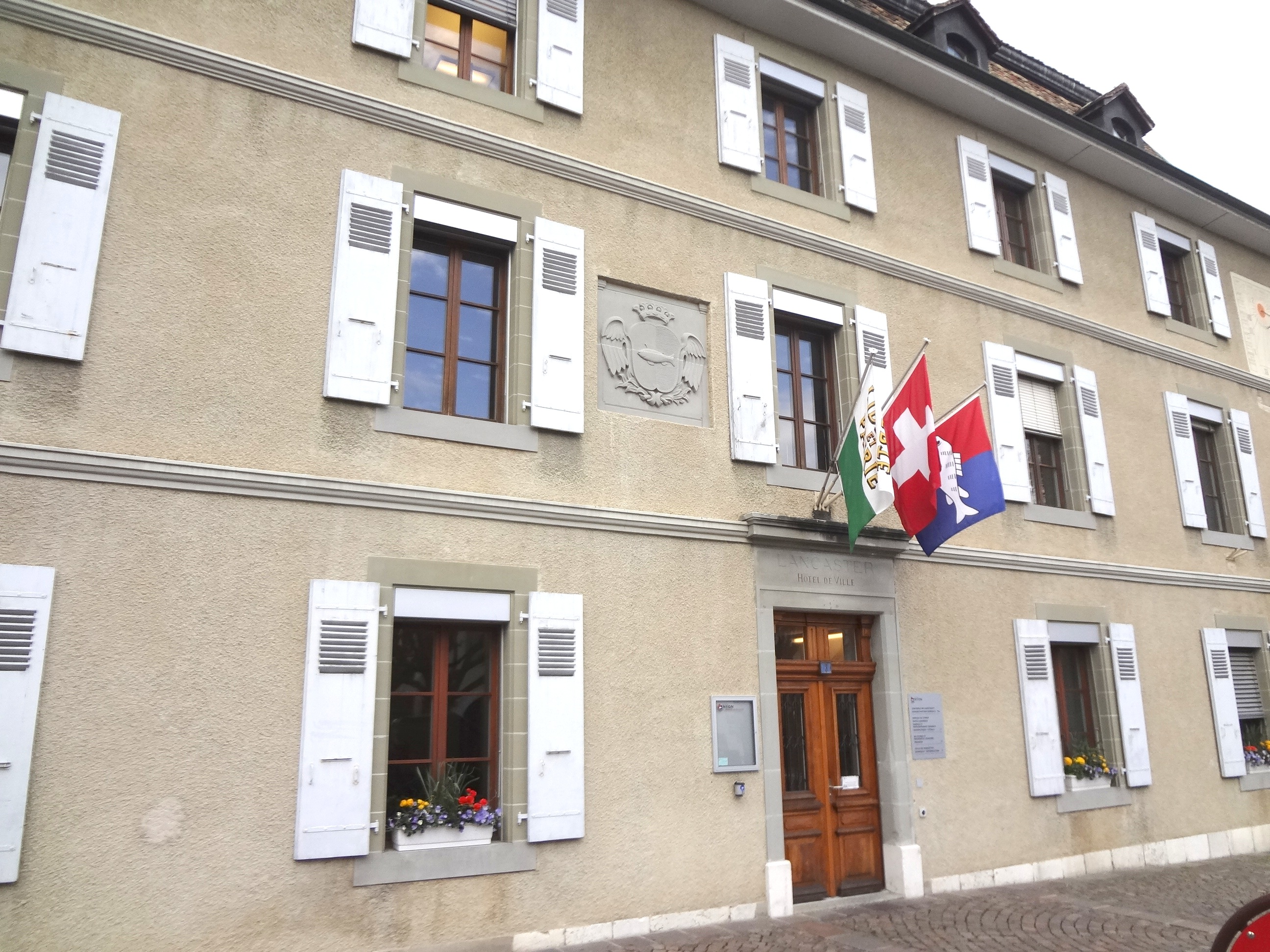
Administration communale de Nyon

Coat of arms of Nyon

This is a list of mayors of Nyon, Vaud, Switzerland. The mayor (syndic) of Nyon chairs the seven-member council (Municipalité).

Mayor (syndic) of Nyon
Term	Mayor	Lifespan	Party	Notes
1894–1931	Louis Bonnard	(1853–1931)		
1946–1953	Henri Bally	(1902–1980)	POP (until 1952)	
1954–1969	Alfred Michaud	(1914–1990)		
1970	Roger Blanc	(1920–1993)		
1971–1973	Maurice Ruey	(1909–2008)		
1972–1985	Michel Hans	(1922-2017)	Parti Indépendant Nyonnais	
1986–2001	Jacques Locatelli			
2001–2007	Alain-Valéry Poitry	(born 1952)	PSS (until 2006)	destituted after moving to Prangins
2008–present	Daniel Rossellat	(born 1953)		
