= List of mayors of Vevey =

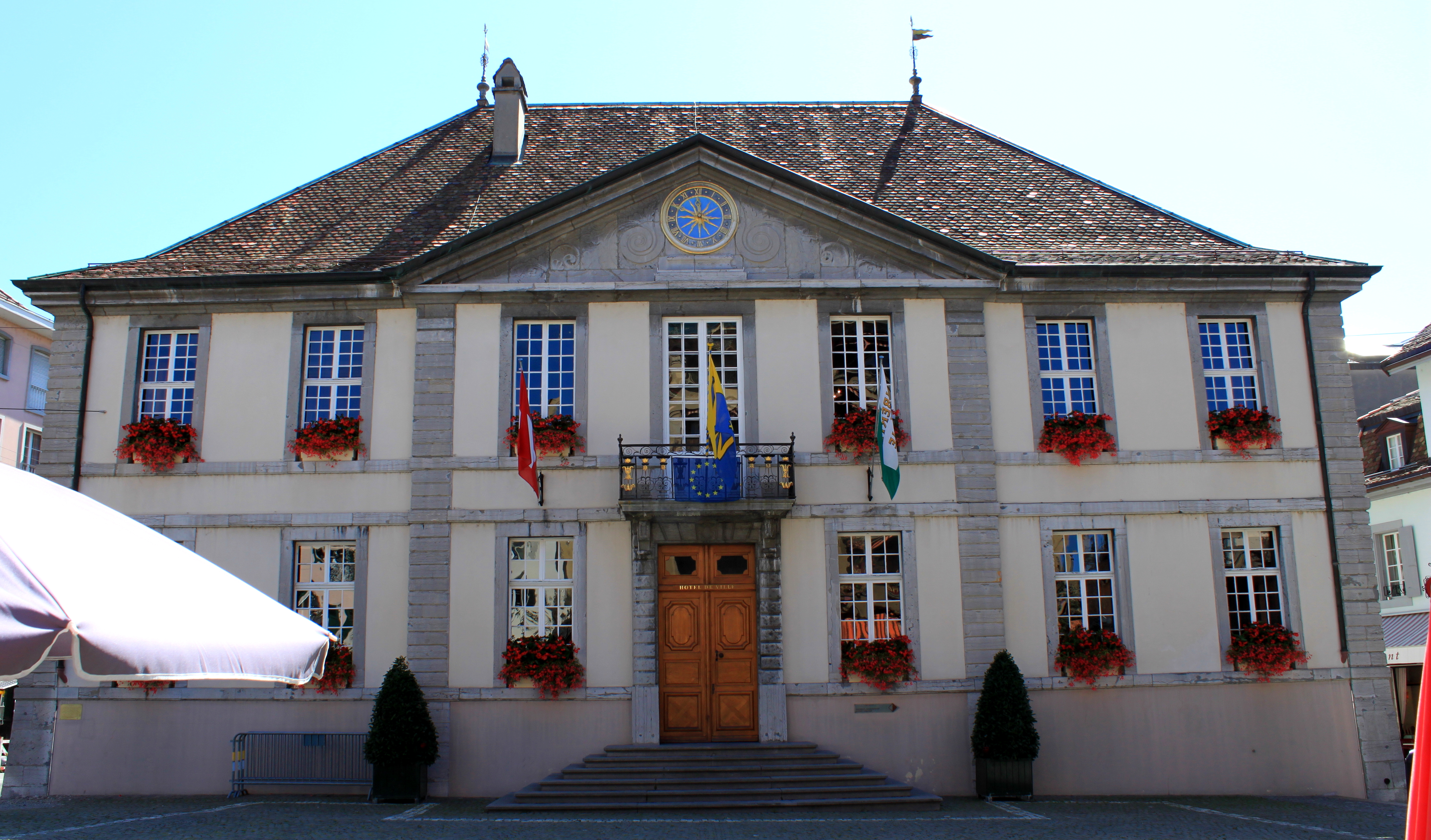
Hôtel-de-Ville, Vevey

Coat of arms of Vevey

This is a list of mayors of the city of Vevey, Switzerland.

Mayor (Syndic) of Vevey
Term	Mayor	Lifespan	Party	Notes
1799–1803	L.-Ph. de Mellet			
1803–1806	Et. du Fresne			
1806–1823	Jean-Louis Couvreu de Dekersberg	(1762–1827)		
1823–1832	Jean-Samuel-Béat de Palézieux dit Falconnet	(1767–1843)		
1832–1837	Henri Burnat	(1779–1869)		
1873–1876	Jules Monnerat	(1820–1898)		
1912–1929	Eugène Couvreu	(1862–1945)		
1930–1936	Gustave Chaudet	(1883–1956)	parti bleu	
	Marcel Brawand	(1907–1991)		
1938–1960	David Dénéréaz	(1889–1971)		
1960–1976	Jean Kratzer	(1906–2003)		
1976-	Bernard Chavannes			
1989–2001	Yves Christen	(born 1941)		
2002-	Dominique Rigot	(born 1957)		
2006–present	Laurent Ballif	(born 1951)		
