= Reto Wittwer =

Reto Wittwer is the former president and CEO of Kempinski Hotels & Resorts, Europe's oldest and most established luxury hotel collection, founded in 1897, with 111 deluxe properties in major cities and vacation spots throughout Europe, the Middle East, Africa, and Asia.

Wittwer was the president and chief executive officer of Kempinski Hotel Group between 1995 and 2014. Previously, he served in several top executive positions in the luxury hospitality industry (president and chief executive officer of CIGA Hotels from 1992 to 1995, from 1987 to 1992 in various positions with Swisshotel Group, including general manager/vice president for Far East Asia, senior vice president for operations and eventually president and chief executive officer). He also served as a director of Johnson Diversey Inc. since 2002.

== Early life and education ==
Wittwer was born in Switzerland. He is a graduate of the renowned Ecole Hôtelière de Lausanne (EHL).

== Career ==
After his successful studies he started his hotel career at the Palace Hotel in Madrid. The following six years he worked for InterContinental Hotels in Paris, Frankfurt, Geneva and Tehran. In 1976 he was appointed to director of food and beverage of the Mandarin Singapore International. Two years later Wittwer moved to the Peninsula Group in Hong Kong. In March 1979 Wittwer joined Hyatt International and worked in Canada, Mexico and Indonesia, taking on his first general manager role aged just 30.

In 1982 Wittwer returned to Paris as general manager of the Le Méridien Montparnasse. Five years later he changed to the Swissair Nestlé Swissôtel Ltd as vice president for Asia. During his five years with Swissôtel, he was promoted to senior vice president of operations and was then appointed president and chief executive officer. In 1992, Wittwer joined Ciga S.p.A. as president and chief executive officer.

Wittwer has received many honours for his contribution to the hotel and tourism industry, including Knight of the National Order of Agricultural Merit of France and Ruby Medal of the City of Paris. Most recently he was appointed chairman of the advisory board of World Tourism Forum Lucerne.
