= List of mayors of Zug =

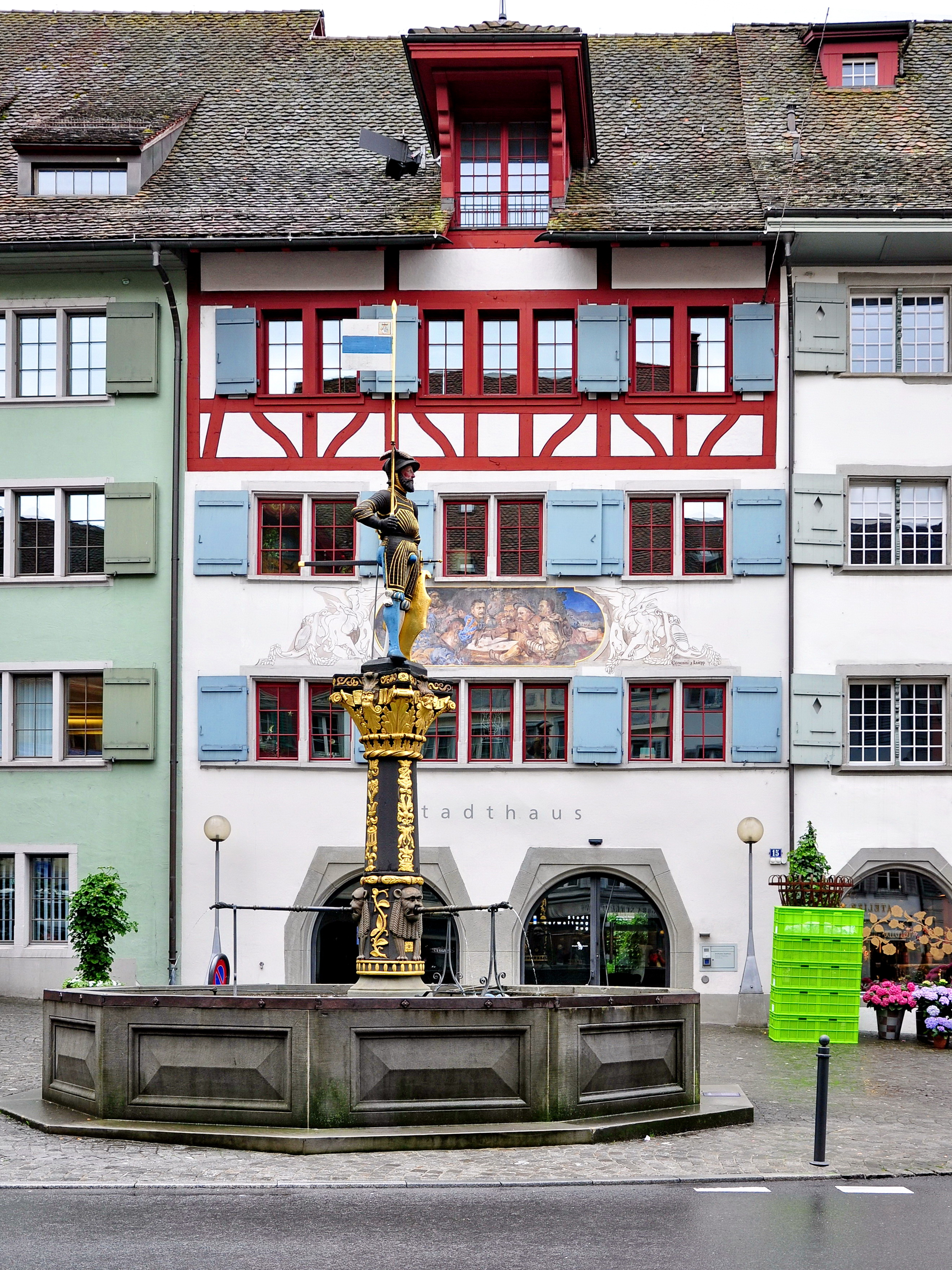
Stadthaus Zug

Coat of arms of Zug

This is a list of mayors of the city of Zug, Switzerland. The executive of Zug is the Stadtrat. It is chaired by the Stadtpräsident.

Mayor (Stadtpräsident) of Zug
Term	Mayor	Lifespan	Party	Notes
1893–1922	Silvan Stadlin	(1843–1925)	Lib.	
1923–1938	Xaver Schmid	(1885–1951)	Conserv.	
1939–1962	Augustin Lusser	(1896–1973)	Conserv.	
1963–1970	Robert Wiesendanger	(1905–1980)	FDP/PRD	
1971–1974	Philipp Schneider	(1913–1994)	CVP/PDC	
1975–1978	Emil Hagenbuch	(1926–1978)	FDP/PRD	
1978–1982	Walther A. Hegglin	(1927–2013)	CVP/PDC	
1983–1994	Othmar Kamer	(1934–2000)	CVP/PDC	
1995–1998	Othmar Romer	(born 1931)	SPS/PSS	
1999–2006	Christoph Luchsinger	(born 1942)	FDP/PRD	
2007–2018	Dolfi Müller	(born 1955)	SPS/PSS	
2019-2022	Karl Kobelt	(born 1959)	FDP/PRD	
2023-Present	André Wicki	(born 1962)	SVP/UDC	
