= Susanna Gossweiler =

Pioneering Swiss educator

Susanna Gossweiler (1740–1793) was a Swiss educator. She was appointed the first principal of the girls' school Töchterschule in Zürich in 1774, and is regarded as a pioneer of women's education in Switzerland.
