= Markus Wenk =

Swiss scientist (born 1969)

Markus R. Wenk
- Born: December 24, 1969 (age 56)
- Occupations: Biochemist and academic

Academic background
- Education: Diploma., Biology; PhD., Biophysics
- Alma mater: University of Basel; Biozentrum University of Basel

Academic work
- Institutions: National University of Singapore; Hamad Bin Khalifa University

Markus R. Wenk is a Swiss biochemist and academic. He is Dean of the College of Health and Life Sciences at Hamad Bin Khalifa University.

Wenk's research focuses on the structure and function of membranes, the metabolism of lipids, the advancement of lipidomics, and incorporating precise molecular analysis into medical research for personalized health. He is the recipient of awards including the Young Researcher Award (2009) and the Research Recognition Award (2019) from the National University of Singapore, as well as the European Lipid Science Award from the European Federation for the Science and Technology of Lipids in 2018.

Wenk served as the Editor-in-Chief of the Encyclopaedia in Lipidomics in 2013 and the Executive Editor of Progress in Lipid Research from 2011 to 2023.

== Education ==
Wenk earned a Diploma in Biology from the University of Basel in 1994, followed by a PhD in Biophysics from the Biozentrum University of Basel in 1997.

== Career ==
Wenk began his academic career as a Postdoctoral Associate at the Yale University School of Medicine from 1997 to 2000, subsequently becoming Associate Research Scientist (2000–2003). In 2004, he joined the National University of Singapore, initially as an assistant professor, and was later appointed associate professor in 2007 and Full Professor in the Department of Biochemistry in 2016. He has been serving as the Visiting Toh Chin Chye Professor at NUS since 2023 and a visiting professor at ETH Zürich in 2024.

Wenk founded and directed the Singapore Lipidomics Incubator (SLING) and the international Singapore Lipid Symposium (iSLS) at NUS from 2010 to 2023, focusing on innovation, education, and collaboration in lipid research. In 2016, he was appointed Provost's Chair at the NUS Yong Loo Lin School of Medicine as well as the Head of the Department of Biochemistry. He served as the Director of the NUS Precision Medicine Translational Research Program from 2020 to 2023, before joining Hamad Bin Khalifa University, where he holds the position of Dean of the College of Health Sciences.

== Research ==
Wenk is most known for his contributions and achievements in the field of lipid science, in particular for the development of lipidomics methods based on mass spectrometry. In a highly cited review article, he underscored lipids' critical role in health and disease and noted that new techniques in lipidomics are advancing the field, offering potential for drug and biomarker development. His research introduced mass spectrometric assays for directly measuring phospholipids in complex lipid mixtures, enabling qualitative and quantitative profiling of lipids and their fatty acid compositions.

Wenk and his team at SLING have contributed to many basic science and clinical research projects. Alongside colleagues, he analyzed 80 sphingolipids in 2,300 Chinese Singaporeans, finding that metabolic imbalances in sphingolipids, rather than their accumulation or depletion, are linked to BMI, insulin resistance, and Type-2 diabetes. Furthermore, looking into the natural variations of lipids in healthy subjects, he revealed that about 15% of lipid metabolites show circadian variations and significant inter-subject differences, indicating diverse circadian metabolic phenotypes in the population. Lipidomic characterization of complex extracts by his team helped identify substrates of orphan transports Mfsd2a and Mfsd2b, linking them to microcephaly and sphingosine-1-phosphate export in blood cells.

In 2017, Wenk launched the creation of a network of collaborating laboratories worldwide to address lipid quantitation challenges and showed that shared reference materials can harmonize mass-spectrometry lipidomics of human plasma across different platforms and labs. He coordinated a ring trial for distinct ceramides in human plasma. It led to concordant concentration values of ceramides in human plasma reference materials via the use of authentic standards.

== Awards and honors ==
- 2018 – European Lipid Science Award, European Federation for the Science and Technology of Lipids
- 2019 – Research Recognition Award, National University of Singapore

== Selected articles ==
- Wenk, M. R., Lucast, L., Di Paolo, G., Romanelli, A. J., Suchy, S. F., Nussbaum, R. L., ... & De Camilli, P. (2003). Phosphoinositide profiling in complex lipid mixtures using electrospray ionization mass spectrometry. Nature biotechnology, 21(7), 813–817.
- Wenk, M. R. (2005). The emerging field of lipidomics. Nature reviews Drug discovery, 4(7), 594–610.
- Chua, E. C. P., Shui, G., Lee, I. T. G., Lau, P., Tan, L. C., Yeo, S. C., ... & Gooley, J. J. (2013). Extensive diversity in circadian regulation of plasma lipids and evidence for different circadian metabolic phenotypes in humans. Proceedings of the National Academy of Sciences, 110(35), 14468–14473.
- Nguyen, L. N., Ma, D., Shui, G., Wong, P., Cazenave-Gassiot, A., Zhang, X., ... & Silver, D. L. (2014). Mfsd2a is a transporter for the essential omega-3 fatty acid docosahexaenoic acid. Nature, 509(7501), 503–506.
- Burla, B., Arita, M., Arita, M., Bendt, A. K., Cazenave-Gassiot, A., Dennis, E. A., ... & Wenk, M. R. (2018). Ms-based lipidomics of human blood plasma: A community-initiated position paper to develop accepted guidelines1. Journal of lipid research, 59(10), 2001–2017.
- Chew, W. S., Torta, F., Ji, S., Choi, H., Begum, H., Sim, X., ... & Herr, D. R. (2019). Large-scale lipidomics identifies associations between plasma sphingolipids and T2DM incidence. JCI insight, 4(13).
- Torta, F., Hoffmann, N., Burla, B. et al. (2024). Concordant inter-laboratory derived concentrations of ceramides in human plasma reference materials via authentic standards. Nature Communications, 15, 8562.
