= Victor Snell =

Swiss journalist

Victor Snell (1874–1931) was a Swiss journalist.
