= Urs Pedraita =

Swiss motorcyclist and adventurer

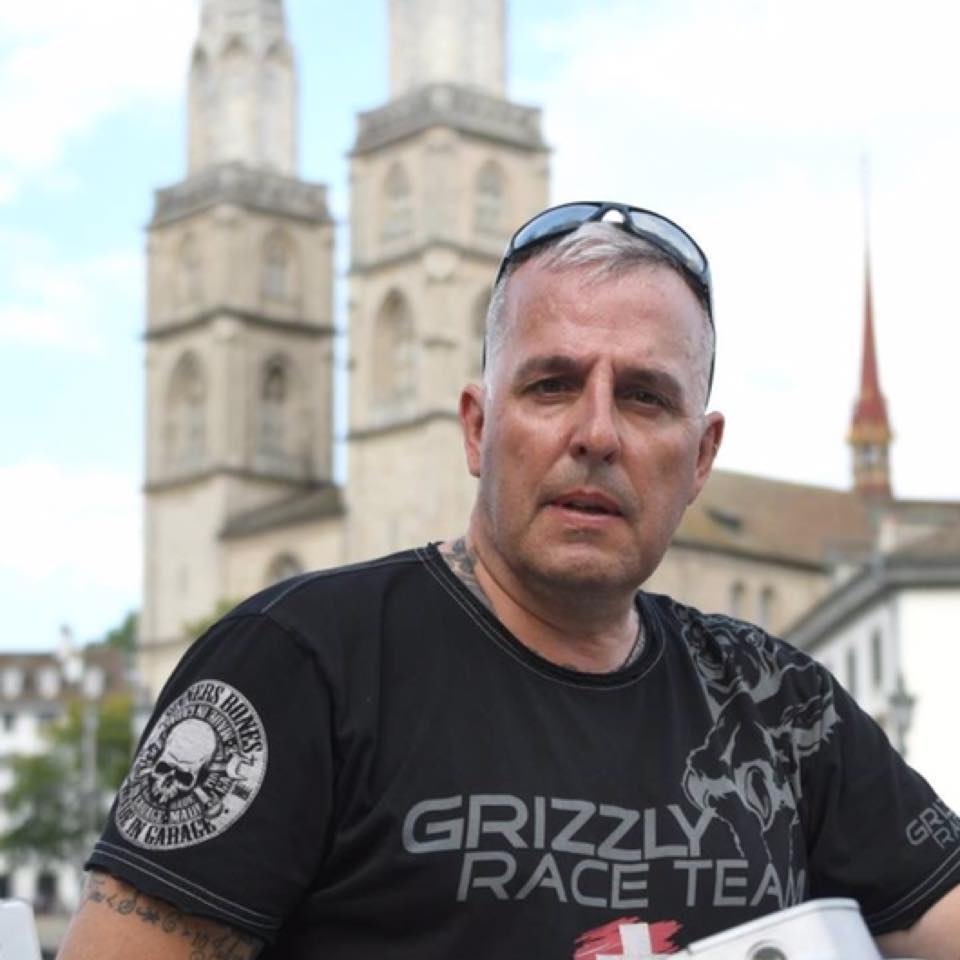
Urs Pedraita

Urs Pedraita is a Swiss motorcycle pilot, adventurer and known for his long distance records.

In 2013, Pedraita was the first to traverse the Siberian Taiga with a motorcycle, without a sidecar. A total of 14,400 km from Bern, Switzerland to Vladivostok, Russia in only 37 days with daytime temperatures down to -42 degree Celsius.

Pedraita's next project was in 2014 when he circled the earth with his motorcycle starting from Bern, Switzerland in only 16 days, 12 hours and 19 minutes.

On February 19, 2015, Pedraita and his team planned to ride the motorcycle with an escort vehicle from Zürich, Switzerland to the North Cape, Norway and back in 106 hours. This record attempt failed after 53 hours in Stockholm due to insufficient strength to get back to Zurich.

In 2016, the adventurer and long distance motorcyclist Urs Pedraita, alias Grisu Grizzly traversed as the first man all continents on their longest axis. With land driving time of 72 days, 12 hours and a distance of 78,889 km, he broke the world record.

Completely on his own and without any escort or support from local organisations, Pedraita rode through the continents America, Australia, Afrika, Europe and Asia. Start was on March 11 2016 in Daytona Beach, FL USA and the finish was also in Daytona Beach, FL USA on July 10 2016. Grizzly was followed by millions of people worldwide on the internet, being equipped with two GPS transponders/trackers, one mounted on the bike and one on his body.

Flight travel was chosen for ocean/sea crossings with a set time of 119 days, 6 hours and a distance of 121,600 km for a total traveling time.
