= Lists of mayors by country =

This is a list of mayors organised by country.

== Argentina ==
- List of mayors and chiefs of government of Buenos Aires
- Mayors of Rosario

== Armenia ==
- Mayor of Yerevan

== Australia ==
- List of mayors and lord mayors of Adelaide
- List of mayors of Albury
- List of mayors of Ballarat
- List of mayors of Bayside
- List of mayors of Bendigo
- List of mayors of Boroondara
- List of mayors and lord mayors of Brisbane
- List of mayors of Cairns
- List of mayors of Collingwood
- List of mayors and lord mayors of Darwin
- List of mayors of Fitzroy
- List of mayors of Fremantle
- List of mayors of Geelong
- List of mayors of Glen Eira
- List of mayors and lord mayors of Hobart
- List of mayors of Launceston
- List of mayors of Malvern
- List of mayors of Manly
- List of mayors and lord mayors of Melbourne
- List of mayors and lord mayors of Perth
- List of mayors of Port Phillip
- List of mayors of Prahran
- List of mayors of Richmond
- List of mayors of Stonnington
- List of mayors of Strathfield
- List of mayors, lord mayors and administrators of Sydney
- List of mayors of Toowoomba
- List of mayors of Wanneroo
- List of mayors of Wyong Shire
- List of mayors of Yarra

== Austria ==
- List of mayors of Linz
- List of mayors of Vienna

== Bangladesh ==
- List of mayors of Dhaka North City Corporation

== Belgium ==
- List of mayors of Antwerp
- List of mayors of Brussels
- List of mayors of Ghent

== Bosnia and Herzegovina ==
- List of mayors of Brčko District
- List of mayors of Sarajevo
- List of mayors of Tuzla

== Botswana ==
- List of mayors of Gaborone

== Brazil ==
- Mayors in Brazil
- List of mayors of Gramado, Rio Grande do Sul
- List of mayors of Porto Alegre
- List of mayors of Rio de Janeiro
- List of mayors of São Paulo

== Bulgaria ==
- List of mayors of Sofia
- List of mayors of Plovdiv
- List of mayors of Varna
- List of mayors of Pleven

== Canada ==
- List of mayors in Canada
- List of the youngest mayors in Canada
- List of mayors of Barrie, Ontario
- List of mayors of Bedford, Nova Scotia
- List of mayors of Brampton, Ontario
- List of mayors of Brantford, Ontario
- List of mayors of Bromont, Quebec
- List of mayors of Calgary, Alberta
- List of mayors of Charlottetown, Prince Edward Island
- List of mayors of Dartmouth, Nova Scotia
- List of mayors of Drummondville, Quebec
- List of mayors of East York, Ontario
- List of mayors of Eastview, Ontario
- List of mayors of Edmonton, Alberta
- List of mayors of Etobicoke, Ontario
- List of mayors of Fort Frances, Ontario
- List of mayors of Gatineau, Quebec
- List of mayors of Halifax, Nova Scotia
- List of mayors of the Halifax Regional Municipality
- List of mayors of Hamilton, Ontario
- List of mayors of Houston, British Columbia
- List of mayors of Kingston, Ontario
- List of mayors of Lethbridge, Alberta
- List of mayors of Lévis, Quebec
- List of mayors of London, Ontario
- List of mayors of Longueuil, Quebec
- List of mayors of Markham, Ontario
- List of mayors of Messines, Quebec
- List of mayors of Mississauga, Ontario
- List of mayors of Montreal, Quebec
- List of mayors of Moose Jaw, Saskatchewan
- List of mayors of Newmarket, Ontario
- List of mayors of North Bay, Ontario
- List of mayors of North York, Ontario
- List of mayors of Oakville, Ontario
- List of mayors of Osgoode Township
- List of mayors of Ottawa, Ontario
- List of mayors of Penticton, British Columbia
- List of mayors of Qualicum Beach, British Columbia
- List of mayors of Quebec City, Quebec
- List of mayors of Red Deer, Alberta
- List of mayors of Regina, Saskatchewan
- List of mayors of St. Albert, Alberta
- List of mayors of Saint John, New Brunswick
- List of mayors of St. John's, Newfoundland and Labrador
- List of mayors of Saint-Sauveur, Quebec
- List of mayors of St. Thomas, Ontario
- List of mayors of Saskatoon, Saskatchewan
- List of mayors of Scarborough, Ontario
- List of mayors of Shawinigan, Quebec
- List of mayors of Sherbrooke, Quebec
- List of mayors of Sudbury, Ontario
- List of mayors of Thunder Bay, Ontario
- List of mayors of Timmins, Ontario
- List of mayors of Toronto, Ontario
- List of mayors of Trois-Rivières, Quebec
- List of mayors of Vancouver, British Columbia
- List of mayors of Vanier, Ontario
- List of mayors of Victoria, British Columbia
- List of mayors of Waterloo, Ontario
- List of mayors of Windsor, Ontario
- List of mayors of Winnipeg, Manitoba
- List of mayors of Yellowknife
- List of mayors of York, Ontario

== Chile ==
- List of mayors of La Cisterna
- List of mayors of Las Condes
- List of mayors of Pichilemu
- List of mayors of Villa Alemana

== China, People's Republic of ==
- List of mayors of Beijing
- List of mayors of Chongqing
- List of mayors of Shanghai
- List of mayors of Tianjin

== China, Republic of ==
- List of mayors of Taipei
- List of mayors of New Taipei (Xinbei)
- List of mayors of Kaohsiung
- List of mayors of Taichung

== Colombia ==
- List of mayors of Bogotá

== Croatia ==
- List of mayors of Split
- List of mayors of Zagreb

== Czech Republic ==
- List of mayors of Brno

== Denmark ==
- List of mayors of Copenhagen

== Estonia ==
- List of mayors of Tallinn
- List of mayors of Tartu

== Finland ==
- Politics of Helsinki § Mayor

== France ==
- List of mayors of Bordeaux
- Brest, France#Mayors of Brest
- List of mayors of Clermont-Ferrand
- List of mayors of Colmar
- List of mayors of Grenoble
- List of mayors of Nantes
- List of mayors of Paris
- List of mayors of Strasbourg

== Georgia ==
- Mayor of Tbilisi

== Germany ==
- List of mayors of Aachen
- List of mayors of Augsburg
- List of mayors of Berlin
- List of mayors of Bonn
- List of mayors of Bremen
- List of mayors of Cologne
- List of mayors of Düsseldorf
- List of mayors of Frankfurt
- List of mayors of Freiburg
- List of mayors of Hamburg
- List of mayors of Hanover
- List of mayors of Leipzig
- List of mayors of Mainz
- List of mayors of Marburg
- List of mayors of Munich
- List of mayors of Nuremberg
- List of mayors of Regensburg

== Greece ==
- List of mayors of Athens
- List of mayors of Kozani
- List of mayors of Thessaloniki

== Hungary ==
- List of mayors of Soltvadkert
- List of mayors of Miskolc

== Iceland ==
- Mayor of Kópavogur
- Mayor of Reykjavík

== Indonesia ==
- List of mayors of Bandung
- List of governors of Jakarta

== Iran ==
- List of mayors of Shiraz
- List of mayors of Tabriz
- List of mayors of Tehran

== Ireland ==
- Lord Mayor of Dublin
- Lord Mayor of Cork
- Mayor of Limerick
- Mayor of Galway
- List of rulers and officers of Galway 1230–1485

== Israel ==
- List of mayors of Jerusalem
- List of mayors of Tel Aviv
- List of mayors of Haifa

== Italy ==
- List of mayors of Florence
- List of mayors of Genoa
- List of mayors of Milan
- List of mayors of Palermo
- List of mayors of Reggio Calabria
- List of mayors of Rome
- List of mayors of Turin
- List of mayors of Venice

== Kazakhstan ==
- Mayor of Almaty § List
- List of Akims Astana City

== Kenya ==
- Mayor of Nairobi

== Latvia ==
- Mayor of Riga

== Lithuania ==
- Vilnius city municipality
- Klaipėda city municipality#Mayors

== Luxembourg ==
- List of mayors of Bertrange
- List of mayors of Betzdorf
- List of mayors of Dudelange
- List of mayors of Esch-sur-Alzette
- List of mayors of Flaxweiler
- List of mayors of Garnich
- List of mayors of Luxembourg City
- List of mayors of Pétange
- List of mayors of Sanem

== Madagascar ==
- Mayor of Antananarivo

== Malta ==
- List of mayors of Malta

== Mexico ==
- Head of Government of the Federal District

== Montenegro ==
- Mayor of Podgorica
- Mayor of Ulcinj

== Nepal ==
- List of mayors of places in Nepal

== Netherlands ==
- List of mayors of Amsterdam
- List of mayors of The Hague
- List of mayors of Heerlen
- List of mayors of Leeuwarden
- List of mayors of Rotterdam
- List of mayors of Utrecht

== New Zealand ==
- Mayors in New Zealand
- Mayor of Auckland
- Mayor of Christchurch
- Mayor of Dunedin
- Mayor of Hamilton, New Zealand
- Mayor of Taupo
- Mayor of Tauranga
- Mayor of Wanganui
- Mayor of Wellington

== Norway ==
- List of mayors of Bergen
- List of mayors of Oslo
- List of mayors of Stavanger
- List of mayors of Trondheim

== Pakistan ==
- List of mayors of Pakistan

Sindh

- List of mayors of Karachi
- Mayor of Sukkur
- Mayor of Hyderabad

Punjab

- Mayor of Lahore
- Mayor of Faisalabad
- Mayor of Multan
- Mayor of Rawalpindi

Khyber Pakhtunkhwa

- Mayor of Peshawar

Balochistan

- Mayor of Quetta

Federal Territory

- Mayor of Islamabad

== Peru ==
- List of mayors of Lima

== Philippines ==
- List of mayors in Metro Cebu
  - Mayor of Cebu City
- List of mayors in Metro Manila
  - Mayor of Caloocan
  - Mayor of Las Piñas
  - Mayor of Makati
  - Mayor of Malabon
  - Mayor of Mandaluyong
  - Mayor of Manila
  - Mayor of Marikina
  - Mayor of Muntinlupa
  - Mayor of Navotas
  - Mayor of Parañaque
  - Mayor of Pasay
  - Mayor of Pasig
  - Mayor of Quezon City
  - Mayor of San Juan, Metro Manila
  - Mayor of Taguig
  - Mayor of Valenzuela
- Mayor of Angeles City
- Mayor of Bacolod
- Mayor of Bacoor
- Mayor of Baguio
- Mayor of Boac, Marinduque
- Mayor of Butuan
- Mayor of Cauayan, Isabela
- Mayor of Cabuyao
- Mayor of Cagayan de Oro
- Mayor of Dasmariñas
- Mayor of Davao City
- Mayor of Dipolog
- Mayor of General Santos
- Mayor of Iba, Zambales
- Mayor of Ilagan
- Mayor of Iloilo City
- Mayor of Lipa, Batangas
- Mayor of Lucena
- Mayor of Naga, Camarines Sur
- Mayor of Odiongan
- Mayor of San Fernando, Pampanga
- Mayor of San Jose del Monte
- Mayor of Santa Maria, Bulacan
- Mayor of Tabuk, Kalinga
- Mayor of Tagbilaran
- Mayor of Zamboanga City

== Poland ==
- List of presidents of Bydgoszcz
- List of mayors of Danzig
- List of mayors of Katowice
- List of mayors of Kraków
- List of mayors of Warsaw

== Portugal ==
- List of mayors of Lisbon

== Romania ==
- List of mayors of Bucharest
- List of mayors of Cluj-Napoca
- List of mayors of Timişoara

== Russia ==
- List of mayors of Moscow
- List of Governors of Saint Petersburg

== Serbia ==
- List of mayors of Belgrade
- List of mayors of Novi Sad
- List of mayors of Kragujevac

== Sierra Leone ==
- List of mayors of Freetown

== Slovakia ==
- Mayor of Bratislava

== Slovenia ==
- List of mayors of Ljubljana

== South Africa ==
- Mayor of Cape Town
- List of mayors of Durban
- Mayor of Johannesburg § List of mayors

== South Korea ==
- Mayor of Seoul
- Mayor of Busan
- Mayor of Daegu
- Mayor of Incheon
- Mayor of Gwangju
- Mayor of Daejeon
- Mayor of Ulsan
- Mayor of Sejong

== Spain ==
- List of mayors of Barcelona
- Mayor-President of Ceuta
- List of mayors of Girona
- List of mayors of Lleida
- List of mayors of Madrid
- List of mayors of Vigo

== Sri Lanka ==
- Mayor of Colombo

== Sweden ==
- List of mayors of Stockholm

== Switzerland ==
- List of mayors of Aarau
- List of mayors of Altstätten
- List of mayors of Arbon
- List of mayors of Baden
- List of presidents of the Executive Council of Basel-Stadt
- List of mayors of Bellinzona
- List of mayors of Bern
- List of mayors of Biel/Bienne
- List of mayors of Brig
- List of mayors of Brig-Glis
- List of mayors of Bulle
- List of mayors of Burgdorf
- List of mayors of Carouge
- List of mayors of Chur
- List of Landammann of Davos
- List of mayors of Delémont
- List of mayors of Frauenfeld
- List of mayors of Fribourg
- List of mayors of Geneva
- List of mayors of Grenchen
- List of mayors of Herisau
- List of mayors of Köniz
- List of mayors of Kreuzlingen
- List of mayors of La Chaux-de-Fonds
- List of mayors of La Tour-de-Peilz
- List of mayors of Lausanne
- List of mayors of Le Châtelard
- List of mayors of Les Planches
- List of mayors of Liestal
- List of mayors of Locarno
- List of mayors of Lucerne
- List of mayors of Lugano
- List of mayors of Martigny
- List of mayors of Montreux
- List of mayors of Morges
- List of mayors of Murten
- List of mayors of Naters
- List of mayors of Neuchâtel
- List of mayors of Nyon
- List of mayors of Olten
- List of mayors of Rapperswil-Jona
- List of mayors of Rheinfelden
- List of mayors of Schaffhausen
- List of mayors of Sierre
- List of mayors of Sion
- List of mayors of Solothurn
- List of mayors of St. Gallen
- List of mayors of Thun
- List of mayors of Trimbach
- List of mayors of Uster
- List of mayors of Vevey
- List of mayors of Wädenswil
- List of mayors of Wil
- List of mayors of Winterthur
- List of mayors of Yverdon
- List of mayors of Zofingen
- List of mayors of Zug
- List of mayors of Zürich

== Taiwan ==
- Mayor of Chiayi
- Mayor of Kaohsiung
- Mayor of Tainan
- Mayor of Taipei

== Tajikistan ==
- Mayor of Dushanbe

== Turkey ==
- List of mayors of Alanya
- List of mayors of Ankara
- List of mayors of Giresun
- List of mayors of Istanbul
- List of mayors of İzmir
- List of mayors of Mersin
- List of mayors of Zile

== United Kingdom ==
- Mayors in the United Kingdom
- Elected mayors in the United Kingdom
- List of lord mayoralties and lord provostships in the United Kingdom
- List of provosts of Aberdeen
- List of mayors of Belfast
- List of mayors of Birmingham
- List of mayors of Bolton
- List of mayors of Cardiff
- Mayor of Colchester
- List of mayors of Coventry
- Mayor of Derry
- List of provosts of Dundee
- List of provosts of Edinburgh
- List of provosts of Glasgow
- Mayor of High Wycombe § Past Mayors
- List of lord mayors of Leicester
- Lord Mayor of Liverpool
- Mayor of London
  - List of heads of London government
  - List of lord mayors of London
- List of lord mayors of Manchester
- List of mayors of Nottingham
- List of mayors of Penzance
- List of provosts of Peterhead
- List of mayors of Sheffield
- List of mayors of Slough
- Mayor of Winchester
- List of mayors of Woking
- List of lord mayors of York

== Ukraine ==
- Mayor of Kyiv
- List of mayors of Odesa, Ukraine

== United States ==
- List of mayors of Akron, Ohio
- List of mayors of Albany, New York
- List of mayors of Albuquerque, New Mexico
- List of mayors of Aliso Viejo, California
- List of mayors of Allentown, Pennsylvania
- List of mayors of Anaheim, California
- List of mayors of Anchorage, Alaska
- List of mayors of Anderson, Indiana
- List of mayors of Ann Arbor, Michigan
- List of mayors of Annapolis, Maryland
- List of mayors of Atlanta, Georgia
- List of mayors of Atlantic City, New Jersey
- List of mayors of Auburn, Alabama
- List of mayors of Auburn, New York
- List of mayors of Augusta, Georgia
- List of mayors of Austin, Texas
- List of mayors of Baltimore, Maryland
- List of mayors of Berkeley, California
- List of mayors of Beverly Hills, California
- List of mayors of Billings, Montana
- List of mayors of Birmingham, Alabama
- List of mayors of Bloomington, Minnesota
- List of mayors of Boca Raton, Florida
- List of mayors of Boise, Idaho
- List of mayors of Boston, Massachusetts
- List of mayors of Bridgeport, Connecticut
- List of mayors of Brockton, Massachusetts
- List of mayors of Brooklyn, New York (1834-98)
- List of mayors of Buffalo, New York
- List of mayors of Cambridge, Massachusetts
- List of mayors of Carrboro, North Carolina
- List of mayors of Carson, California
- List of mayors of Chandler, Arizona
- List of mayors of Chapel Hill, North Carolina
- List of mayors of Charleston, South Carolina
- List of mayors of Charlotte, North Carolina
- List of mayors of Charlottesville, Virginia
- List of mayors of Chattanooga, Tennessee
- List of mayors of Chicago, Illinois
- List of mayors of Chico, California
- List of mayors of Cincinnati, Ohio
- List of mayors of Cleveland
- List of mayors of Columbia, South Carolina
- List of mayors of Columbus, Ohio
- List of mayors of Columbus, Georgia
- List of mayors of Compton, California
- List of mayors of Coon Rapids, Minnesota
- List of mayors of Cordova, Alaska
- List of mayors of Cotati, California
- List of mayors of Cranford, New Jersey
- List of mayors of Cumberland, Maryland
- List of mayors of Dallas, Texas
- List of mayors of Davenport, Iowa
- List of mayors of Dayton, Ohio
- List of mayors of Denver, Colorado
- List of mayors of Des Moines, Iowa
- List of mayors of Detroit, Michigan
- List of mayors of Duluth, Minnesota
- List of mayors of Eagle Mountain, Utah
- List of mayors of East Chicago, Indiana
- List of mayors of El Paso, Texas
- List of mayors of Erie, Pennsylvania
- List of mayors of Evanston, Illinois
- List of mayors of Evansville, Indiana
- List of mayors of Fairbanks, Alaska
- List of mayors of Fargo, North Dakota
- List of mayors of Fayetteville, Arkansas
- List of mayors of Flint, Michigan
- List of mayors of Floral Park, New York
- List of mayors of Fort Lauderdale, Florida
- List of mayors of Fort Myers, Florida
- List of mayors of Fort Wayne, Indiana
- List of mayors of Fort Worth, Texas
- List of mayors of Fresno, California
- List of mayors of Gainesville, Florida
- List of mayors of Garden City, Georgia
- List of mayors of Garden Grove, California
- List of mayors of Gary, Indiana
- List of mayors of Glendale, California
- List of mayors of Grand Forks, North Dakota
- List of mayors of Grand Rapids, Michigan
- List of mayors of Hampton, Virginia
- List of mayors of Harrisburg, Pennsylvania
- List of mayors of Hartford, Connecticut
- List of mayors of Harvard, Illinois
- List of mayors of Hialeah, Florida
- List of mayors of Highland Park, New Jersey
- List of mayors of Hoboken, New Jersey
- List of mayors of Hollywood, Florida
- List of mayors of Holyoke, Massachusetts
- List of mayors of Honolulu, Hawaii
- List of mayors of Houston, Texas
- List of mayors of Huntsville, Alabama
- List of mayors of Indianapolis, Indiana
- List of mayors of Inglewood, California
- List of mayors of Jackson, Mississippi
- List of mayors of Jacksonville, Florida
- List of mayors of Jeffersonville, Indiana
- List of mayors of Jersey City, New Jersey
- List of mayors of Juneau, Alaska
- List of mayors of Kanab, Utah
- List of mayors of Kansas City, Missouri
- List of mayors of Key West, Florida
- List of mayors of Lakeland, Florida
- List of mayors of Lansing, Michigan
- List of mayors of Largo, Florida
- List of mayors of Las Vegas, Nevada
- List of mayors of Laurel, Maryland
- List of mayors of Lincoln, Nebraska
- List of mayors of Littleton, Colorado
- List of mayors of Little Rock, Arkansas
- List of mayors of Long Beach, California
- List of mayors of Longmont, Colorado
- List of mayors of Lorain, Ohio
- List of mayors of Los Angeles, California
- List of mayors of Louisville, Kentucky
- List of mayors of Lynwood, California
- List of mayors of Macon, Georgia
- List of mayors of Manchester, New Hampshire
- List of mayors of Marysville, Washington
- List of mayors of Maui County, Hawaii
- List of mayors of McHenry, Illinois
- List of mayors of Memphis, Tennessee
- List of mayors of Meridian, Mississippi
- List of mayors of Mesa, Arizona
- List of mayors of Miami, Florida
- List of mayors of Miami Beach, Florida
- List of mayors of Miami-Dade County, Florida
- List of mayors of Milpitas, California
- List of mayors of Milwaukee, Wisconsin
- List of mayors of Minneapolis, Minnesota
- List of mayors of Mobile, Alabama
- List of mayors of Montgomery, Alabama
- List of mayors of Muncie, Indiana
- List of mayors of Nashville, Tennessee
- List of mayors of New Albany, Indiana
- List of mayors of New Britain, Connecticut
- List of mayors of New Brunswick, New Jersey
- List of mayors of New Castle, Indiana
- List of mayors of New Haven, Connecticut
- List of mayors of New Orleans, Louisiana
- List of mayors of New York City, New York
- List of mayors of Newark, New Jersey
- List of mayors of Newport Beach, California
- List of mayors of Newport News, Virginia
- List of mayors of North Miami, Florida
- List of mayors of Norwalk, Connecticut
- List of mayors of Oakland, California
- List of mayors of Ohio City, Ohio
- List of mayors of Oklahoma City
- List of mayors of Omaha, Nebraska
- List of mayors of Opa-locka, Florida
- List of mayors of Orange County, Florida
- List of mayors of Orlando, Florida
- List of mayors of Oxnard, California
- List of mayors of Paducah, Kentucky
- List of mayors of Palm Bay, Florida
- List of mayors of Palm Springs, California
- List of mayors of Paradise Valley, Arizona
- List of mayors of Pasadena, California
- List of mayors of Peachtree City, Georgia
- List of mayors of Pensacola, Florida
- List of Mayors of Peoria, Arizona
- List of mayors of Philadelphia, Pennsylvania
- List of mayors of Phoenix, Arizona
- List of mayors of Pittsburgh, Pennsylvania
- List of mayors of Plano, Texas
- List of mayors of Ponce, Puerto Rico
- List of mayors of Portland, Maine
- List of mayors of Portland, Oregon
- List of mayors of Providence, Rhode Island
- List of mayors of Raleigh, North Carolina
- List of mayors of Richmond, California
- List of mayors of Richmond, Virginia
- List of mayors of Riverside, California
- List of mayors of Roanoke, Virginia
- List of mayors of Robbins, Illinois
- List of mayors of Rochester, Minnesota
- List of mayors of Rochester, New York
- List of mayors of Rock Island, Illinois
- List of mayors of Rockford, Illinois
- List of mayors of Rockville, Maryland
- List of mayors of Rogersville, Tennessee
- List of mayors of Roswell, Georgia
- List of mayors of Sacramento, California
- List of mayors of Saginaw, Michigan
- List of mayors of Saint Louis, Missouri
- List of mayors of St. Petersburg, Florida
- List of mayors of Stamford, Connecticut
- List of mayors of Saint Paul, Minnesota
- List of mayors of Salt Lake City, Utah
- List of mayors of San Antonio, Texas
- List of mayors of San Bernardino, California
- List of mayors of San Diego, California
- List of mayors of San Diego, California (pre-statehood)
- List of mayors of San Francisco, California
- List of mayors of San Jose, California
- List of mayors of San Jose, California (pre-statehood)
- List of mayors of San Juan, Puerto Rico
- List of mayors of Santa Barbara, California
- List of mayors of Saratoga Springs, New York
- List of mayors of Savannah, Georgia
- List of mayors of Scottsdale, Arizona
- List of mayors of Seaside, California
- List of mayors of Seattle, Washington
- List of mayors of Shreveport, Louisiana
- List of mayors of Sioux City, Iowa
- List of mayors of South Bend, Indiana
- List of mayors of Spokane, Washington
- List of mayors of Springfield, Illinois
- List of mayors of Springfield, Massachusetts
- List of mayors of Stockton, California
- List of mayors of Syracuse, New York
- List of mayors of Tallahassee, Florida
- List of mayors of Tampa, Florida
- List of mayors of Tempe, Arizona
- List of mayors of Terre Haute, Indiana
- List of mayors of Toledo, Ohio
- List of mayors of Topeka, Kansas
- List of mayors of Tucson, Arizona
- List of mayors of Tulsa, Oklahoma
- List of mayors of Tuskegee, Alabama
- List of mayors of Vancouver, Washington
- List of mayors of Venice, Illinois
- List of mayors of Ventura, California
- List of mayors of Vernon, Connecticut
- List of mayors of Virginia Beach, Virginia
- List of mayors of Wallingford, Connecticut
- List of mayors of Washington, D.C.
- List of mayors of Wasilla, Alaska
- List of mayors of West Palm Beach, Florida
- List of mayors of Williamsport, Pennsylvania
- List of mayors of Wilmington, Delaware
- List of mayors of Worcester, Massachusetts
- List of mayors of Youngstown, Ohio

== Zimbabwe ==
- Mayor of Harare

== See also ==
- List of mayors of Moresnet
- List of mayors of Nablus
- World Mayor
- List of first female mayors
- Special:Allpages/Mayor of
