= List of mayors in Metro Cebu =

The following is the list of incumbent mayors of Metro Cebu. Metro Cebu is the main urban center of the province of Cebu in the Philippines, comprising seven cities and six municipalities.

The mayors of Metro Cebu are considered as the local chief executives of their respective localities and are also members of the Metropolitan Cebu Development and Coordinating Board (MCDCB) patterned to Metropolitan Manila Development Authority (MMDA) but doesn't have legal and institutional powers and resources.

== List of mayors ==
City/Municipality	Mayor	Birth Date	Political Party	Term	Assumed Office	Past	Vice Mayor	Ref.
Carcar	Patrick Barcenas	31 March 1959 (age 66)	1-Cebu	1st	30 June 2022	List	Hervy de Dios	
Cebu City	Nestor Archival	2 June 1958 (age 67)	Liberal	1st	30 June 2025	List	Tomas Osmeña	
Compostela	Felijur Quiño	12 March 1968 (age 57)	NUP	1st	30 June 2022	List	Froilan Quiño	
Consolacion	Teresa Alegado	15 December 1956 (age 68)	PDP–Laban	1st	30 June 2022	List	Aurelio Damole	
Cordova	Cesar Suan		Lakas	1st	30 June 2022	List	Boyet Tago III	
Danao	Ramon Durano III	7 July 1948 (age 77)	BAKUD	3rd	30 June 2025	List	Carmen Durano	
Lapu-Lapu	Cynthia Chan	10 March 1968 (age 57)	Lakas	1st	30 June 2025	List	Celedonio Sitoy	
Liloan	Aljew Frasco		1-Cebu	1st	2 July 2022	List	Darwin Apas	
Mandaue	Jonkie Ouano	16 November 1979 (age 46)	Lakas	1st	30 June 2025	List	Glenn Bercede	
Minglanilla	Rajiv Enad	7 February 1985 (age 40)	Nacionalista	1st	30 June 2022	List	Elanito Peña	
Naga	Valdemar Chiong	5 September 1960 (age 65)	Nacionalista	1st	30 June 2022	List	Virgilio Chiong	
San Fernando	Mytha Canoy	3 November 1977 (age 48)	PPP	1st	30 June 2022	List	Eugema Bacalla	
Talisay	Samsam Gullas	1 December 1984 (age 41)	Nacionalista	2nd	30 June 2019	List	Richard Aznay	
