= List of mayors of Freiburg =

The following is a list of all mayors ("Oberbürgermeister" or "Lord Mayor") of Freiburg, Baden-Württemberg, since 1806.

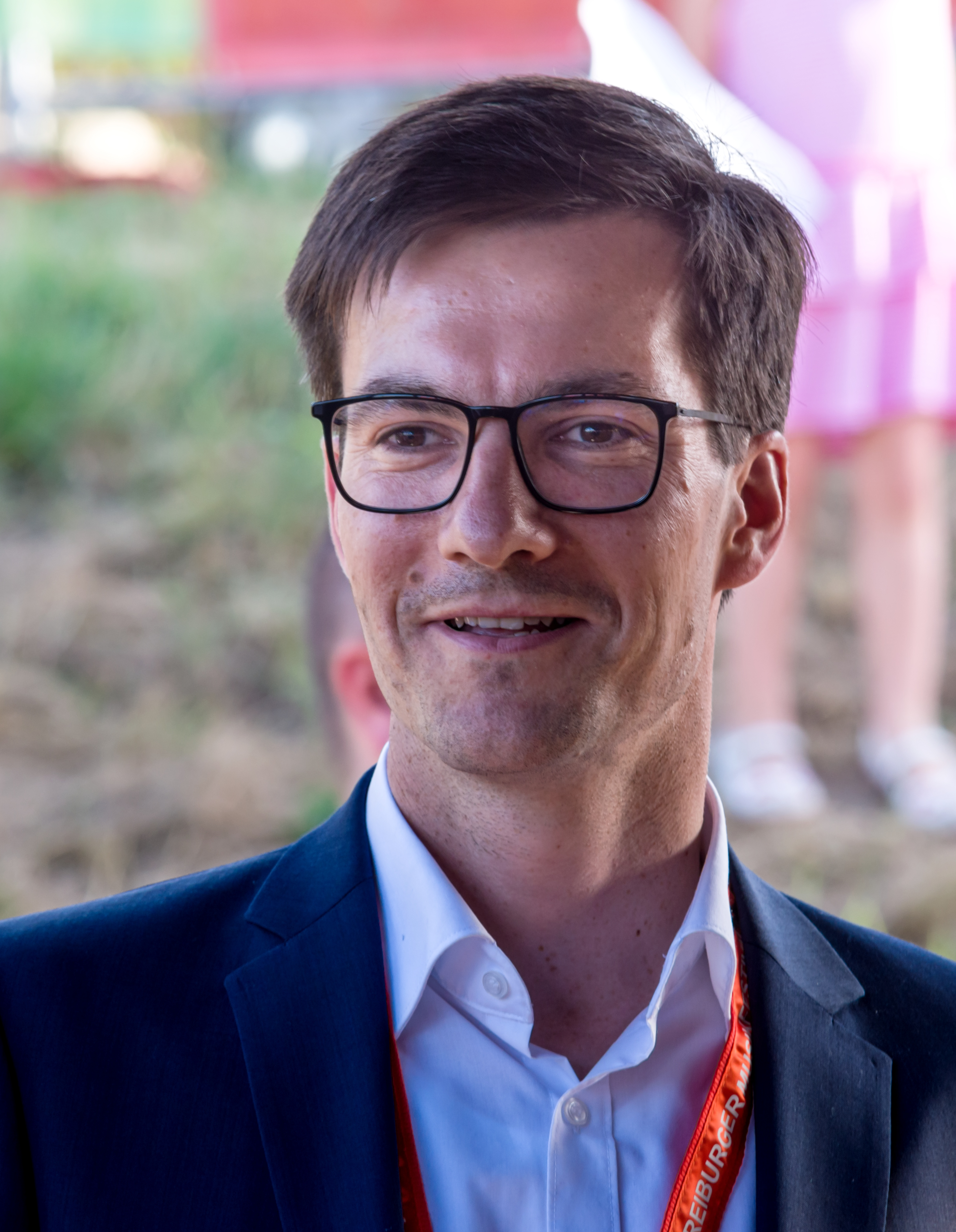
Martin Horn, current mayor

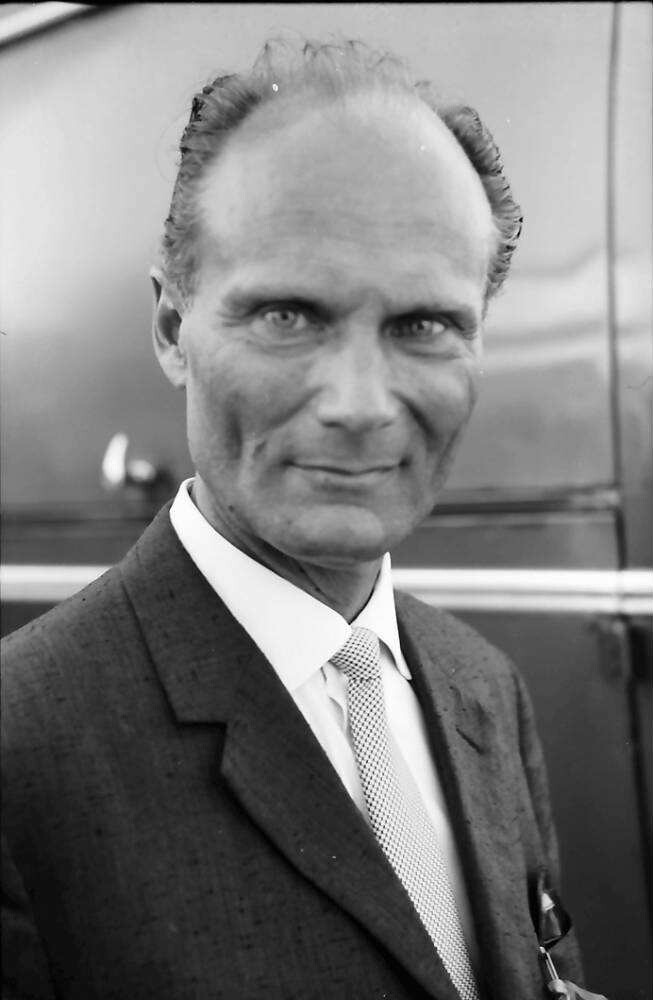
Eugen Keidel 1962–1982

- 1806–1824: Johann Josef Adrians
- 1826–1827: Fidel Andre
- 1828–1832: Raimund Bannwarth
- 1833–1839: Joseph von Rotteck
- 1839–1840: Friedrich Wagner
- 1848–1849: Joseph von Rotteck
- 1850–1852: Johann Baptist Rieder
- 1852–1859: Friedrich Wagner
- 1859–1871: Eduard Fauler
- 1871–1876: Karl Schuster
- 1876-1888: Christian Bauer
- 1888–1913: Otto Winterer
- 1913–1922: Emil Thoma
- 1922–1933: Karl Bender
- 1933–1945: Franz Kerber
- 1945–1946: Max Keller
- 1946–1956: Wolfgang Hoffmann
- 1956–1962: Josef Brandel
- 1962–1982: Eugen Keidel
- 1982–2002: Rolf Böhme
- 2002–2018: Dieter Salomon
- 2018–present: Martin Horn
