= Floral Park, New York =

Village in New York, United States

- Village
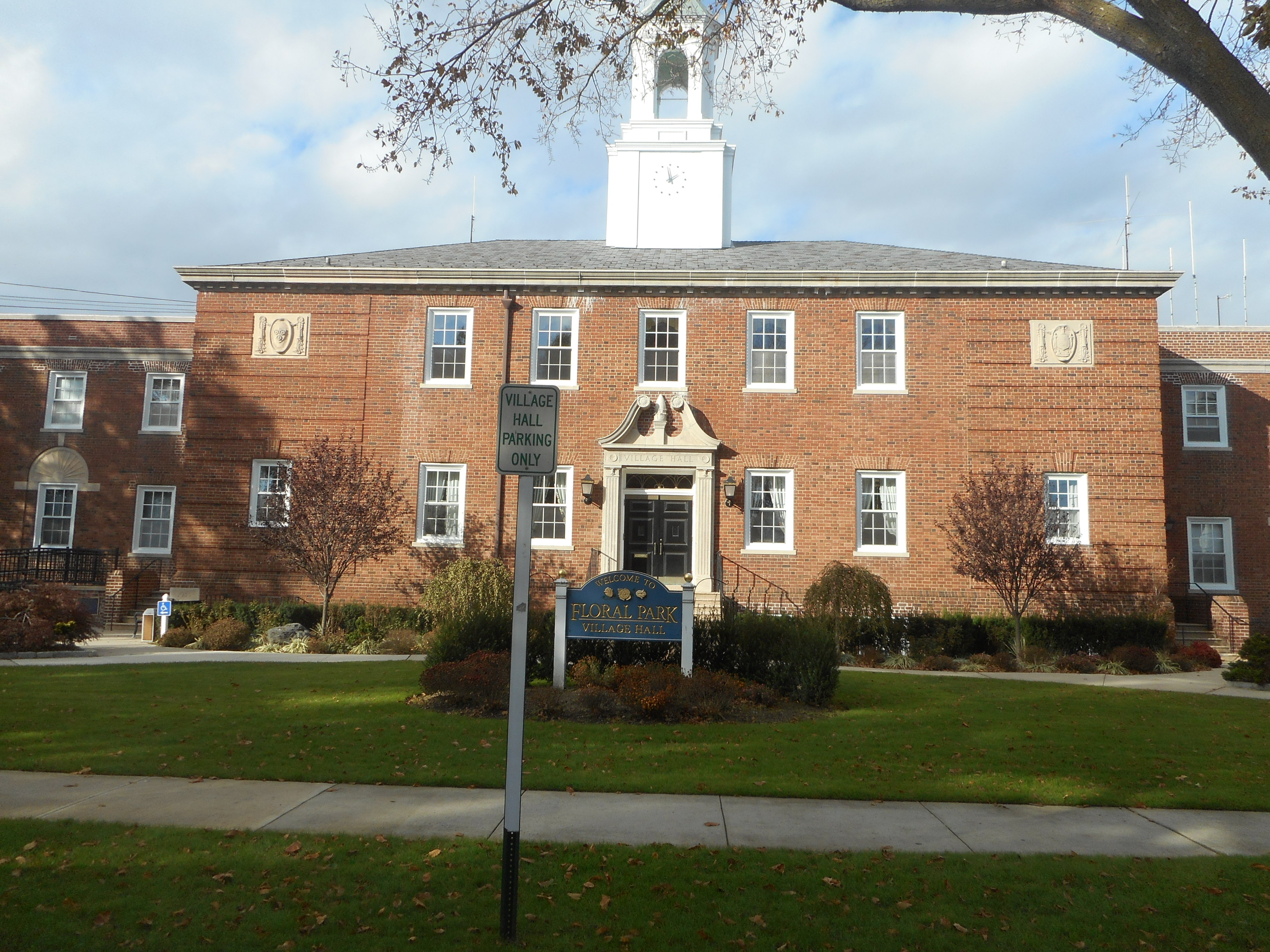
- Floral Park Village Hall in 2017

- Flag Seal
- Motto: "A Great Place to Live"
- Location in Nassau County and the state of New York

- Location on Long Island Location within the state of New York
- Coordinates: 40°43′26″N 73°42′21″W
- Country: United States
- State: New York
- County: Nassau
- Towns: Hempstead; North Hempstead
- Founded: 1874
- Incorporated: 1908
- Founder: John Lewis Childs

Government
  - Type: Strong Mayor-Council
  - Mayor: Kevin Fitzgerald

Area
  - Total: 1.44 sq mi (3.72 km^{2})
  - Land: 1.42 sq mi (3.68 km^{2})
  - Water: 0.012 sq mi (0.03 km^{2})
- Elevation: 92 ft (28 m)

Population (2020)
  - Total: 16,172
  - Density: 11,381/sq mi (4,394.2/km^{2})
- Time zone: UTC-5 (EST)
  - Summer (DST): UTC-4 (EDT)
- ZIP Codes: 11001, 11004
- Area codes: 516, 363
- FIPS code: 36-26264
- GNIS feature ID: 0950296
- Website: floralparkny.gov

Floral Park is an incorporated village located in western Nassau County, on Long Island, in New York, United States. The population was 16,172 at the time of the 2020 census.

Floral Park is at the western border of Nassau County, mainly in the Town of Hempstead, while the section north of Jericho Turnpike (NY 25) is within the Town of North Hempstead. The area was formerly known as East Hinsdale.

The neighborhood of Floral Park in the New York City borough of Queens is adjacent to – but not part of – the village.

== History ==
The area that is now Floral Park once marked the western edge of the great Hempstead Plains, and by some reports was initially known as Plainfield. Farms and tiny villages dominated the area through the 1870s when the development of the Long Island Rail Road Hempstead Branch and Jericho Turnpike cut through the area. Hinsdale had more than two dozen flower farms after the Civil War. The present-day village of Floral Park was once called East Hinsdale.

In 1874, John Lewis Childs arrived in the area to work for C.L. Allen as a seed seller. After building his own seed and bulb business and starting America's first seed catalog business, Childs bought a great deal of land in the area. To promote his own business and the local horticultural industry, Childs named the local streets after flowers and renamed the area Floral Park. The expansion of the Floral Park Post Office and nearby village businesses are attributed solely to the success of Childs' business.

When the local Post Office took the name Floral Park, the Long Island Rail Road followed suit by changing the name of the community's train station from East Hinsdale to Floral Park in 1888. Formerly part of Queens County, Floral Park became part of the newly formed Nassau County in 1899. It was subsequently incorporated as a village in 1908. Childs served as its first Village President starting that year.

By 1903, the village boasted more than 200 acres (0.81 km^{2}) of Childs' flower beds. The massive volume of his mail order business grew the local post office to such an extent that it drew comparisons with the post offices of Chicago, Baltimore, and Boston.

In 1936, as the village continued to grow, Floral Park Village Hall was built, allowing the village to house its government in a centralized, efficient facility.

In 1960, as part of a grade-crossing elimination project executed by the New York Public Service Commission, the Long Island Rail Road was elevated through the village; the Floral Park station was rebuilt on an elevated viaduct as part of the project.

== Geography ==
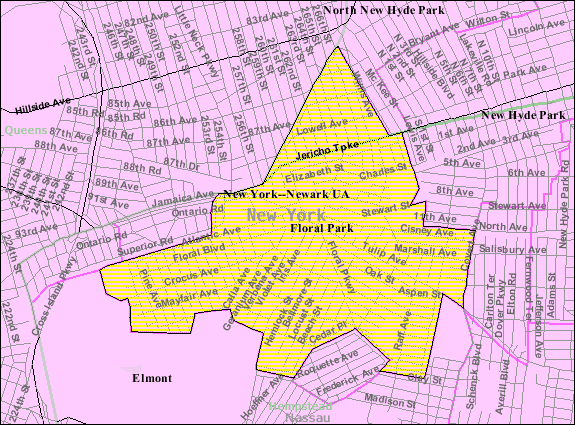
U.S. Census map of Floral Park

According to the United States Census Bureau, the village has a total area of 1.4 square miles (3.6 km^{2}), all land.

Portions of the northern and western village boundaries are the border with New York City.

The village also shares borders with the several Nassau County communities; the Village of Floral Park borders the Village of Bellerose and Bellerose Terrace to the northwest, the Incorporated Villages of New Hyde Park and Stewart Manor to the east, the Incorporated Village of South Floral Park to the south, and the unincorporated hamlet of Elmont to the southwest – in addition to the unincorporated hamlets of Floral Park Centre and North New Hyde Park to the northeast.

=== Drainage ===
The Village of Floral Park is located within the Hook Creek Watershed, which – in turn – is located within the larger Long Island Sound/Atlantic Ocean Watershed.

=== Climate ===
According to the Köppen climate classification, the Village of Floral Park has a Humid subtropical climate (type Cfa) with cool, wet winters and hot, humid summers. Precipitation is uniform throughout the year, with slight spring and fall peaks.

Climate data for Floral Park Village, New York, 1991–2020 normals, extremes 1999–present
Month	Jan	Feb	Mar	Apr	May	Jun	Jul	Aug	Sep	Oct	Nov	Dec	Year
Record high °F (°C)	71 (22)	73 (23)	85 (29)	94 (34)	97 (36)	103 (39)	105 (41)	104 (40)	100 (38)	90 (32)	83 (28)	76 (24)	105 (41)
Mean daily maximum °F (°C)	39 (4)	43 (6)	50 (10)	61 (16)	70 (21)	80 (27)	85 (29)	83 (28)	76 (24)	65 (18)	55 (13)	45 (7)	63 (17)
Mean daily minimum °F (°C)	26 (−3)	28 (−2)	34 (1)	42 (6)	51 (11)	61 (16)	66 (19)	65 (18)	58 (14)	48 (9)	40 (4)	31 (−1)	46 (8)
Record low °F (°C)	−10 (−23)	−7 (−22)	3 (−16)	13 (−11)	32 (0)	43 (6)	50 (10)	48 (9)	38 (3)	27 (−3)	10 (−12)	−1 (−18)	−10 (−23)
Average precipitation inches (mm)	3.62 (92)	3.17 (81)	4.35 (110)	4.15 (105)	3.90 (99)	3.85 (98)	4.40 (112)	3.72 (94)	3.91 (99)	4.08 (104)	3.73 (95)	3.82 (97)	46.7 (1,186)
Source: The Weather Channel

==== Plant zone ====
According to the United States Department of Agriculture (USDA), the Village of Floral Park is located within hardiness zone 7b.

== Demographics ==
Historical population
Census	Pop.	Note	%±
1910	1,225		—
1920	2,097		71.2%
1930	10,016		377.6%
1940	12,950		29.3%
1950	14,582		12.6%
1960	17,499		20.0%
1970	18,466		5.5%
1980	16,805		−9.0%
1990	15,947		−5.1%
2000	15,967		0.1%
2010	15,863		−0.7%
2020	16,172		1.9%
U.S. Decennial Census

=== Racial and ethnic composition ===
Floral Park village, New York – Racial and ethnic composition Note: the U.S. Census treats Hispanic/Latino as an ethnic category. This table excludes Latinos from the racial categories and assigns them to a separate category. Hispanics/Latinos may be of any race.
Race / ethnicity (NH = Non-Hispanic)	Pop 2000	Pop 2010	Pop 2020	% 2000	% 2010	% 2020
White alone (NH)	14,290	12,938	11,495	89.50%	81.56%	71.08%
Black or African American alone (NH)	59	198	262	0.37%	1.25%	1.62%
Native American or Alaska Native alone (NH)	7	10	14	0.04%	0.06%	0.09%
Asian alone (NH)	617	1,086	1,889	3.86%	6.85%	11.68%
Native Hawaiian or Pacific Islander alone (NH)	5	3	3	0.03%	0.02%	0.02%
Other Race alone (NH)	31	53	82	0.19%	0.33%	0.51%
Mixed Race or Multi-Racial (NH)	99	184	360	0.62%	1.16%	2.23%
Hispanic or Latino (any race)	859	1,391	2,067	5.38%	8.77%	12.78%
Total	15,967	15,683	16,172	100.00%	100.00%	100.00%

=== 2020 census ===
As of the 2020 census, Floral Park had a population of 16,172. The median age was 43.4 years. 21.4% of residents were under the age of 18 and 18.7% of residents were 65 years of age or older. For every 100 females there were 94.0 males, and for every 100 females age 18 and over there were 91.3 males age 18 and over.

100.0% of residents lived in urban areas, while 0.0% lived in rural areas.

There were 5,746 households in Floral Park, of which 34.2% had children under the age of 18 living in them. Of all households, 61.0% were married-couple households, 12.5% were households with a male householder and no spouse or partner present, and 23.1% were households with a female householder and no spouse or partner present. About 21.5% of all households were made up of individuals and 11.6% had someone living alone who was 65 years of age or older.

There were 5,961 housing units, of which 3.6% were vacant. The homeowner vacancy rate was 0.6% and the rental vacancy rate was 4.6%.

=== 2010 census ===
As of the 2010 census, the population was 87% White, 81.6% Non-Hispanic White, 1.3% Black or African American, 0.1% Native American, 6.9% Asian, 0.0% Pacific Islander, 2.6% from other races, and 2% from two or more races. Hispanic or Latino of any race were 8.8% of the population.

=== 2000 census ===
As of the census of 2000, there were 15,967 people, 5,770 households, and 4,258 families residing in the village. The population density was 11,635.9 inhabitants per square mile (4,492.6/km^{2}). There were 5,892 housing units at an average density of 4,293.8 per square mile (1,657.8/km^{2}). The racial makeup of the village was 93.56% White, 0.46% African American, 0.06% Native American, 3.88% Asian, 0.03% Pacific Islander, 1.03% from other races, and 0.98% from two or more races. Hispanic or Latino of any race were 5.38% of the population.

There were 5,770 households, out of which 34.0% had children under the age of 18 living with them, 60.9% were married couples living together, 9.9% had a female householder with no husband present, and 26.2% were non-families. 23.1% of all households were made up of individuals, and 11.6% had someone living alone who was 65 years of age or older. The average household size was 2.76 and the average family size was 3.30.

In the village, the population was spread out, with 24.5% under the age of 18, 6.4% from 18 to 24, 28.3% from 25 to 44, 25.3% from 45 to 64, and 15.6% who were 65 years of age or older. The median age was 40 years. For every 100 females, there were 89.3 males. For every 100 females age 18 and over, there were 85.4 males.

The median income for a household in the village was $113,719, and the median income for a family was $137,243. Males had a median income of $56,527 versus $38,592 for females. The per capita income for the village was $51,183. None of families or the population were below the poverty line, including none of those under age 18 and none of those age 65 or over.

=== Housing ===
The average and median sales prices of a home in the village as of 2011, were, respectively, $468,738 and $460,000.

The average Floral Park, NY home value is $885,445, up 5.6% over the past year. (Updated on 7/31/2026)

== Education ==
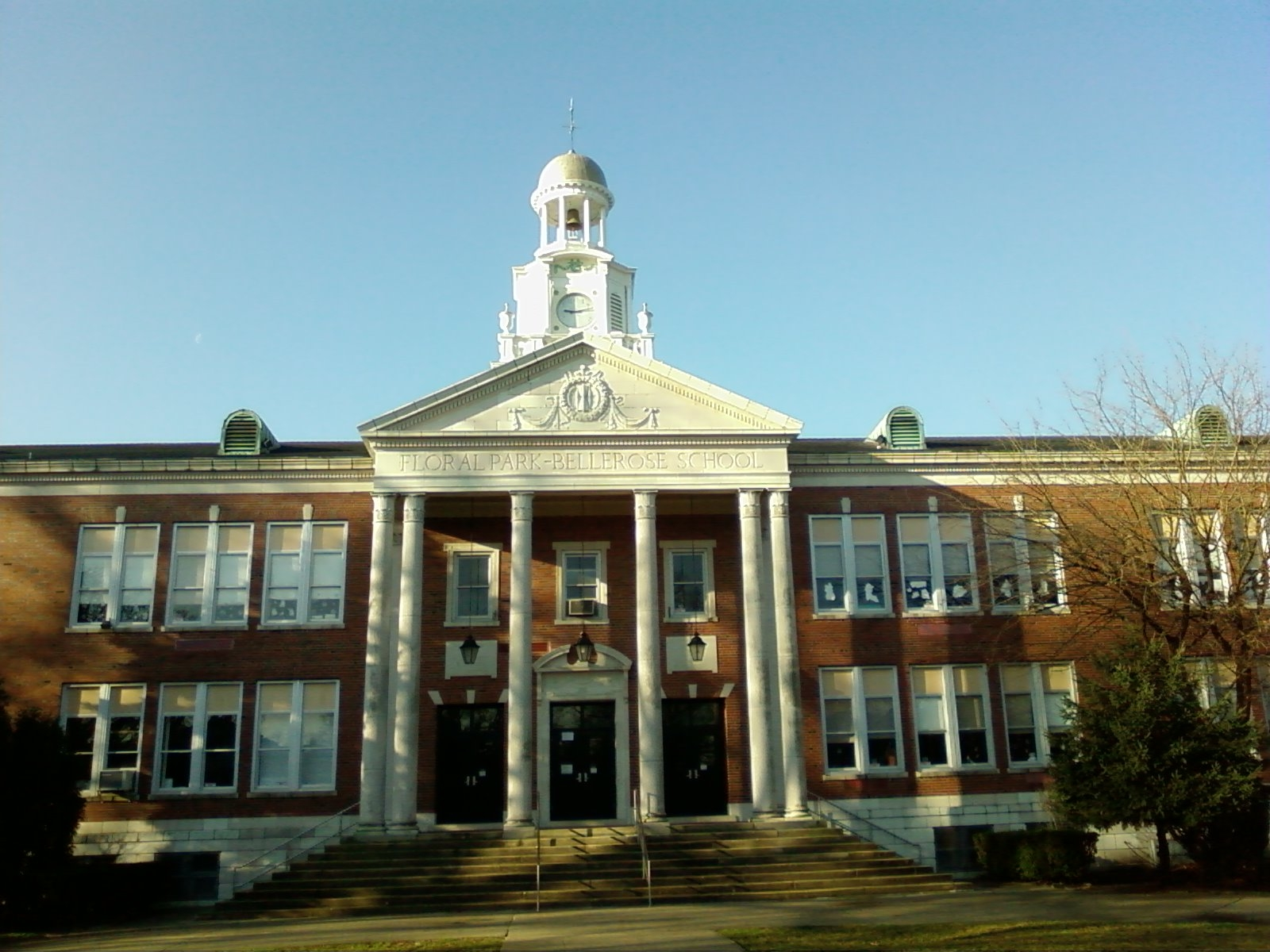
The Floral Park–Bellerose School

The Village of Floral Park is located within the boundaries of (and is thus served by) the Floral Park–Bellerose Union Free School District and the Sewanhaka Central High School District.

Two high schools are located in Floral Park: Floral Park Memorial High School and Sewanhaka High School, both of which are part of the Sewanhaka Central High School District (which also includes schools in nearby New Hyde Park, Franklin Square and Elmont).

There are three elementary schools in Floral Park. Two of them – the John Lewis Childs School and the Floral Park–Bellerose School – are part of the Floral Park–Bellerose Union Free School District (the latter school also serves the neighboring village of Bellerose and Bellerose Terrace).

Furthermore, Our Lady of Victory Elementary School is operated by the Roman Catholic Diocese of Rockville Centre, Our Lady of Victory parish.

== Emergency services ==
The Village of Floral Park has its own Police Department, which is made up of an Operations and Administration division.

The Floral Park Police Department provides service to all residents within the boundaries of the Village of Floral Park. The Village also has a volunteer fire department, made up of three Engine Companies (Alert Engine Co. #1, Reliance Engine Co. #2, Active Engine Co. #3), a Hook & Ladder Company, and a Rescue (Emergency Medical Services) Company.

== Notable people ==
- Benedetto Aloi (1935–2011), consigliere of Colombo crime family, New York City mobster
- Craig Carnelia (born 1949), musical theater composer and singer, known for his collaboration on the musicals Working and Sweet Smell of Success
- John Lewis Childs (1856–1921), horticulturist and politician; founding father of the Village of Floral Park
- Alex Cord (1933–2021), actor
- Diana Diamond (born 1937), newspaper editor
- William Diard (1924–2009), opera singer
- Steve Falteisek (born 1972), former Major League Baseball pitcher, who was drafted in the tenth round of the 1992 Major League Baseball Draft by the Montreal Expos
- Robert Mapplethorpe (1946–1989), photographer, born and raised on the Queens side
- Pete Nice (born 1967), hip-hop MC (born Peter J. Nash)
- Pete Richert (born 1939), former Major League Baseball pitcher
- Stephen Roberts (1917–1999), actor
- Max Shachtman (1904–1972), associate of Leon Trotsky
- William Bradley Strickland (1929–1990), composer and music educator, who grew up in Floral Park
- John Williams (born 1932), classical composer and conductor

== Adjacent Queens neighborhood ==
The Queens neighborhood is adjacent to the Village of Floral Park, and uses the designation "North Floral Park" with a ZIP Code of 11004 and telephone area codes of 718, 347, and 917. North Floral Park also extends into the ZIP Code of 11001. The neighborhood is part of Queens Community Board 13. Floral Park is a middle-class neighborhood that consists mostly of Cape Cod–style houses. Most of the houses were built after World War II to accommodate returning soldiers. Veterans today make up 11 percent of all residents in Floral Park, versus six percent citywide.

Union Turnpike is the border between the neighborhoods, with Glen Oaks to the north. The other boundaries of Floral Park are roughly Little Neck Parkway and 252nd Street to the west, Langdale Street to the east, and a diagonal boundary from Hillside Avenue at 271st Street to Jericho Turnpike at 257th Street to the south. The neighborhood is close to the Cross Island Parkway and the Grand Central Parkway. MTA New York City Transit buses serve Floral Park on the Q36, Q43 local routes and QM68 express route. MTA Bus Company operates the QM5, QM6, QM35 and QM36 express buses, to Midtown Manhattan and the Q110 bus to Jamaica. The neighborhood is also served by Nassau Inter-County Express n22, n24 and n26 bus. The Floral Park station, located in Nassau County, is the closest service on the Long Island Rail Road Hempstead Branch, which travels to Jamaica station and to Penn Station in Midtown Manhattan.

== See also ==
- List of municipalities in New York
- South Floral Park, New York
