= List of mayors of Miskolc =

This is a list of mayors that served the city of Miskolc, Hungary after 1990.

- 1990–1993 – Tamás Csoba (Fidesz)
- 1993–1994 – Ildikó T. Asztalos (SZDSZ)
- 1994–2002 – Tamás Kobold (KDNP in 1994; Fidesz in 1998)
- 2002–2010 – Sándor Káli (MSZP)
- 2010–2019 – Ákos Kriza (Fidesz)
- 2019–2024 – Pál Veres (independent, supported by parties opposed to Fidesz)
- Since 2024 – József Tóth-Szántai (independent, supported by Fidesz)

== See also ==
- List of Hungarians#History and politics
- Lists of mayors by country
