= Christiane Brunner =

Swiss politician and lawyer (1947–2025)

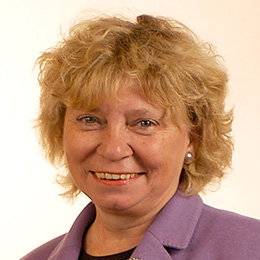

Personal details
- Born: 23 March 1947 Geneva, Switzerland
- Died: 18 April 2025 (aged 78)
- Party: Social Democratic Party

Christiane Brunner (23 March 1947 – 18 April 2025) was a Swiss politician and lawyer.

== Career ==
Brunner occupied several government positions. She was Deputy of the Great Council of the Canton of Geneva from 1981 to 1990 and a member of the National Council, from 1991 to 1995, and of the Council of States, from 1995 to 2007. She was also president of the Swiss Socialist Party from 2000 to 2004.

== 1993 election ==
Brunner was the official candidate of the Socialist Party when René Felber retired from the Federal Council in 1993. On 3 March 1993 the Federal Assembly elected Francis Matthey, however he forfeited this position due to the opposition of his own party. On 10 March 1993 Ruth Dreifuss was elected to the Federal Council over Christiane Brunner.

== Positions ==
Brunner was very active in affairs dealing with trade unions (she was president of the FTMH union), and was a member of Parliament who became very engaged when topics such as Social Security and labor laws were discussed.

She was the president of the Committee for Social Security and Public Health in the Council of States (CSSS-CE).

== Death ==
Brunner died on 18 April 2025, at the age of 78.
