= Ellsworth Jones =

American politician

Mayor of Saratoga Springs, New York
- In office 1980–1990
- Preceded by: Raymond Watkin
- Succeeded by: Almeda C. Dake

Personal details
- Born: January 6, 1918 Corinth, New York
- Died: December 31, 2006 (aged 88) Saratoga Springs, New York

Ellsworth J. Jones, Jr. (January 6, 1918 – December 31, 2006) was a Mayor of Saratoga Springs, New York, and veteran of World War II.

== Early life ==
He was born on January 6, 1918, in Corinth, New York, to Mary Swider and Ellsworth J. Jones Sr. His sisters were Katherin, Mary Louise, and Eleanor and his brother was John F. Jones' father was born November 23, 1888, in Vermont and died September 12, 1971, in Corinth, New York. Jones Sr. was proprietor of the Central Hotel in Corinth, and later became vice president of Hayes Tobacco Company.

Jones graduated from St. Mary's – St. Alphonsus Regional Catholic School in 1936. He enlisted in the United States Army in January 1942.

== World War II service ==
Jones joined the service in early 1942, shortly after the attack on Pearl Harbor. He rose through the ranks quickly, becoming a paratrooper with the famed 101st Airborne Division, the "Screaming Eagles." He participated in the D-Day invasion of Normandy, commanding a platoon of troops as 1st Lieutenant, within G Company, 502 Parachute Infantry Regiment, 101st Airborne Division. After parachuting several miles inland from the French coast during the early morning hours of June 6 troops under his command successfully captured and disabled a German 88mm gun firing on Utah Beach, the platoon's primary objective. Jones and his troops participated in the battle of Carentan (June 10–12). During the battle, Jones was hit in the back by shrapnel from a German bomb when fighter planes strafed his position. A 1-inch (25 mm) square piece of steel lodged in his back. Unable to breathe, his life was spared when a fellow paratrooper covered up the hole in his back with his hand enabling Jones' lungs to once again fill with air.

He was awarded a Bronze Star, Purple Heart, and Croix de Guerre for his services. Later, he was active in veterans groups and in 2005 he was inducted into the New York State Senate's Veterans Hall of Fame.

== Career ==
He founded the Hayes Tobacco Company in 1952 in Saratoga Springs, New York, which he operated until selling the business in 1977. From July 1968 to April 1969, Jones was also the relocation officer for the Saratoga Springs Urban Renewal Agency, resigning in 1969 in order to focus more on his company.

In 1979 he was elected Mayor of Saratoga Springs, New York. He held the position for five terms before retiring in 1990. As mayor, he was a driving force for the construction of the Saratoga Springs City Center in 1984. He also helped attract to the city a Quad/Graphics printing press and a Ball Corporation canning factory, major employers in the city. He also worked to keep property taxes low. Upon retirement, Jones expressed frustration at the city's commission style government by which legislation is voted on by the mayor and four commissioners, limiting the mayor's power.

== Personal life and death ==
He married Betty Donohue in about 1948 and they had four children: John, Mark, Matthew, and Susan. He died on New Year's Eve, December 31, 2006.
