= Dorothy G. Page =

American politician

- Born: Dorothy Guzzi; January 23, 1921; Bessemer, Michigan
- Died: November 16, 1989 (aged 68); Wasilla, Alaska
- Resting place: Aurora Cemetery, Wasilla, Alaska
- Occupations: Businesswoman, civic volunteer, writer
- Known for: Founding the Iditarod Trail Sled Dog Race and Wasilla's city government
- Office: Mayor of Wasilla, Alaska
- Term: 1986–1987
- Predecessor: Charlie Bumpus
- Successor: John C. Stein
- Spouse: Vondolee Page

Dorothy G. Page (January 23, 1921 – November 16, 1989) was best known as "Mother of the Iditarod Trail Sled Dog Race", the 1,049-mile (about 1,600 km) dog sled race across the U.S. state of Alaska.

Page moved from New Mexico to Alaska in 1960. She then became the president of the Phillip-Knik Centennial Committee in 1966, and was in charge of coming up with an event to celebrate the 100th anniversary of the purchase of Alaska from Russia. In her own words, the self-described "history buff" wanted "a spectacular dog race to wake Alaskans up to what mushers and their dogs had done for Alaska."

Page saw her first dog sled race in 1960. At the time, nearly every household in the rural Alaska Bush and Interior had a team of sled dogs for transportation. During the 1960s snowmachines started to replace the dogs, which all but vanished. The historic Iditarod Trail that passed through both Wasilla and Knik was an ideal stage. Dog mushing had been the primary means of communication and transportation in the Bush and Interior by Alaska Natives for centuries; remained so for the Russian, American, and French Canadian fur trappers in the 19th century; and reached its peak during the gold rushes of the late 19th to early 20th centuries.

Page was unable to get the support of a single dog musher until she met Joe Redington, Senior (the "Father of the Iditarod") at the Willow Winter Carnival. Redington used dog teams to perform search and rescue for the U.S. Air Force, and owned a large kennel. He also had been lobbying to make the Iditarod Trail a National Historic Trail since the 1950s. Redington agreed to lend his support to the event, on the condition that a purse of US$25,000 be divided among the winners.

The money was raised. In February 1967, 58 dog mushers competed in two heats along a 25-mile (40 km) stretch of the old Iditarod Trail between Wasilla and Knik. The race was modeled after the first large dog sled race in the state, the 1908 to 1918 All-Alaska Sweepstakes (AAS) of Nome. The official name of the event was the Iditarod Trail Seppala Memorial Race, after the three-time Sweepstakes champion Leonhard Seppala. While Seppala was most famous for participating in the 1925 serum run which saved the city of Nome from a diphtheria epidemic, according to Page "Seppala was picked to represent all mushers... but it could just as easily have been named after Scotty Allan" (the founder of the AAS).

In 1968 the race was canceled due to lack of snow, and the 1969 race was the last: With a purse of only $1,000, only 12 mushers participated. The Iditarod was held in 1973, largely due to Redington's efforts. The route of the race was extended more than 1,000 miles (1,600 km) to Nome, and a purse of $51,000 was raised. The Iditarod Trail Sled Dog Race has since grown into the premiere sporting event in the state, and the largest dog sled race in the world. The popularity also caused dog mushing to revive in the 1970s as a recreational sport.

Page also helped form the Iditarod Trail Committee, which organizes the race, and the Musher's Hall of Fame in Knik. She served four terms on the Wasilla City Council, and was mayor from 1986 to 1987. She volunteered as the president of the Wasilla-Knik-Willow Creek Historical Society, and was the curator of the Wasilla and Knik museums.

Page died on November 16, 1989. Despite her contributions to the sport, she was never a musher. After her death, the Wasilla Museum was renamed the Dorothy G. Page Museum in her honor. (Page’s name was removed from the Wasilla Museum & Visitor Center in 2018.) Page is also commemorated by the Dorothy G. Page Halfway Award, given to the first musher to reach the midpoint of the race, in Cripple on even-numbered years, and the trail's namesake of Iditarod on odd-numbered years. She was named the honorary musher during the 1997 Iditarod.

== See also ==
- List of mayors of Wasilla, Alaska
