= Francis Matthey =

Swiss politician (1942–2025)

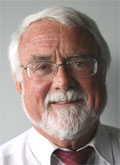
Francis Matthey, former member of the Swiss National Council

Francis Matthey (French pronunciation: [fʁɑ̃sis matɛ]; 17 June 1942 – 20 March 2025) was a Swiss politician of the Social Democratic Party of Switzerland (SPS/PSS), best known for declining his election to the Swiss Federal Council on 3 March 1993. Matthey was elected instead of the official candidate of his party, Christiane Brunner. To follow the resolution of the party to enable the election of a woman to the Federal Council, he declined the office. Ruth Dreifuss was finally elected to succeed René Felber.

== Career ==
Matthey was from Le Locle. He served as the 53rd mayor of the city of La Chaux-de-Fonds (1980–1988), a member of the Swiss National Council (1987–1995) and a member of the Council of State of the canton of Neuchâtel (1988–2001).

He was elected to the Swiss Federal Council in 1993 but declined to take his seat. To date he remains the last elected member to decline to be seated.

Matthey died in 2025 at age 82.
