= Froilan Quiño =

Filipino politician

The Honorable Froilan Quiño
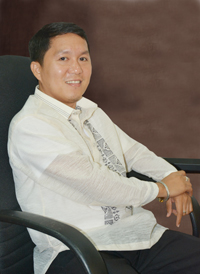

Vice Mayor of Compostela
- Incumbent
- Assumed office June 30, 2022
- Mayor: Felijur Quiño
- Preceded by: Josephine Abing

Mayor of Compostela
- In office June 30, 2019 – June 30, 2022
- Vice Mayor: Josephine Abing
- Preceded by: Joel Quiño
- Succeeded by: Felijur Quiño

Personal details
- Born: Froilan Ochea Quiño; January 5, 1981 (age 45) Compostela, Cebu, Philippines
- Party: BAKUD

Froilan Ochea Quiño is a Filipino politician from Compostela, Cebu, Philippines. He currently serves as the vice mayor of Compostela since 2022. Quiño previously served as the mayor of Compostela from 2019 to 2022 together with former vice mayor and now councilor Josephine Abing. Quiño previously served as councilor of Compostela and as Association of Barangay Councils (ABC) President.
