= List of mayors of Brig =

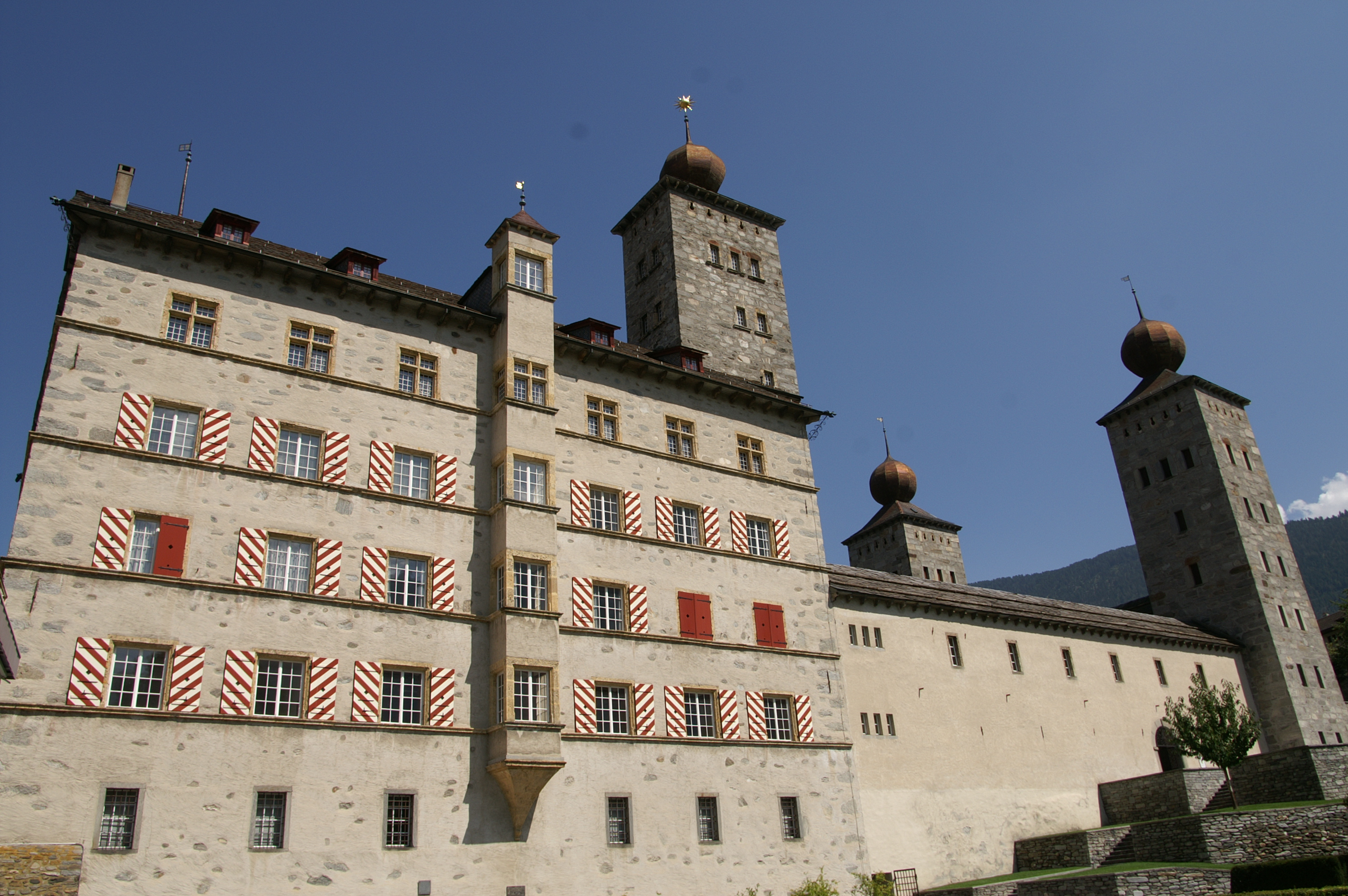
Stockalperschloss Brig

Coat of arms of Brig

This is a list of mayors of Brig, Switzerland. Brig is a former municipality of the canton of Valais. It merged in 1973 with Glis and Brigerbad to form Brig-Glis.

Mayor (Präsident, Stadtpräsident, Gemeindepräsident) of Brig
Term	Mayor	Lifespan	Party	Notes
1900–1904	Othmar Kluser	(1868–1923)		
1905–1910	Hermann Seiler	(1876–1961)	KVP	
1913–1920	Alfred Clausen	(1877–1957)	KVP	
1921–1925	Oskar Walpen	(1883–1931)	KVP	
1925–1928	Anton Meyenberg	(1866–1951)	KVP	
1929–1944	Leo Guntern	(1894–1981)	CSP	
1945–1967	Moritz Kämpfen	(1907–1967)	KVP	
1967–1972	Werner Perrig	(born 1927)	KVP	last mayor of Brig, later mayor of Brig-Glis (1973–1984)

For later mayors, see:

- List of mayors of Brig-Glis
