= Mayor of Boac, Marinduque =

Below is the list of the municipal mayors of Boac, Marinduque, since the Philippines gained independence in 1898.

Order	Mayor	Vice Mayor
1st Mayor of Boac; 1898	Tomas Roque	
2nd Mayor of Boac; 1898-1900	Florentino Paras	
3rd Mayor of Boac; 1900-1901	Tomas Del Mundo	
4th Mayor of Boac; 1901-1903	Pedro M. Nieva	
5th Mayor of Boac; 1903-1905	Doroteo Mercader	
6th Mayor of Boac; 1905-1907	Tomas Del Mundo	
7th Mayor of Boac; 1907-1909	Pedro Madrigal	
8th Mayor of Boac; 1909-1916	Vicente Trivino	
9th Mayor of Boac; 1916-1922	Gumersindo De La Santa	
10th Mayor of Boac; 1922-1925	Jose Deogracias	
11th Mayor of Boac; 1925-1929	Pedro Del Mundo	
12th Mayor of Boac; 1929-1931	Jose Deogracias	Ciriaco M. Manrique
13th Mayor of Boac; 1931-1933	Ramon Moreno	Ciriaco M. Manrique
14th Mayor of Boac; 1933-1934	Geronimo Lanot	Ciriaco M. Manrique
15th Mayor of Boac; 1934-1937	Lucio Livelo	Ciriaco M. Manrique
16th Mayor of Boac; 1937-1940	Fernando Canovas	Ciriaco M. Manrique
Acting Mayor of Boac; 1940	Ciriaco M. Manrique	Ciriaco M. Manrique
17th Mayor of Boac; 1940-1941	Pedro Del Mundo	Ciriaco M. Manrique
18th Mayor of Boac; 1941-1944	Joaquin Roque	
Japanese Occupation; 1944-1946	Unknown/vacated	
19th Mayor of Boac; 1946-1959	Jose Madrigal	Ciriaco M. Manrique (1946–1955)
20th Mayor of Boac; 1959-1971	Cesar L. Nepomuceno	
21st Mayor of Boac; 1971-1980	Dominador M. Leonida	
22nd Mayor of Boac; 1980-1986	Remedios Reyes-Festin	
23rd Mayor of Boac; 1986-1987	Pedrito M. Nepomuceno	
24th Mayor of Boac; 1988-1992	Dominador M. Leonida	
25th Mayor of Boac; 1992-1993	Alejandro B. Solomon	Alfonso M. Labay
26th Mayor of Boac; 1993-1995	Alfonso M. Labay	
27th Mayor of Boac; 1995-2004	Roberto M. Madla	Dante J. Marquez
28th Mayor of Boac; 2004-2010	Meynardo B. Solomon	Sonny L. Paglinawan (2004-2007); Dante J. Marquez (2007-2010)
29th Mayor of Boac; 2010–2019	Roberto M. Madla	Dante J. Marquez (2010-2016); Robert E. Opis (2016-2019)
30th Mayor of Boac; 2019–present	Armi D. Carreon	Sonny L. Paglinawan (2019-2022); Mark Anthony E. Seño (2022-present)

== List ==
- 22nd Mayor of Boac
- 1978 - 1980
- Pablo N. Marquez
- After Mayor Cesar Nepomuceno's one term Myaor Jose M. Madgrial was re-elected Mayor of Boac 1963-67
- Cesar Nepomuceno served from 1959- 1963
- Mayor Jose Madrigal 1963to 67
- Mayor dominador Leonida 1967 to 78
- Vice Mayors:
- Present - robert Opis
- For Cesar L. Nepomuceno - vice Mayor Salvador Jamilla
- For Mayor Jose Montelyola Madrigal's last term = vice Mayor Dominador Leonida
- For Mayor Dominador Leonida - Voce Mayro Alfonso Hidalgo
- For Mayor Remdios Festn -VM Dr. Leva
- Mayor Pedrito Nepomuceno vice Mayor Antonio Barorro
- Mayor Dominador Leonida - Vice Mayor Alejandro Solomon
- Mayor Alejandro B. Solomon - vice Mayor alfonso Labay
- Mayor Alfonso Labay Vice Mayor Dahlia Mirafuente Jandusay
