= List of mayors of Tuskegee, Alabama =

Mayors of Tuskegee, Alabama include:

- J. R. Wood
- Joseph Oswalt Thompson
- Ernest W. Thompson, c.1915-1916
- William Varner, 1916 to 1919
- W.H. Crawford, c.1923
- L.W. Johnston, c.1924
- Robert Fulwood Ligon
- Philip M. Lightfoot defendant in a gerrymandering case after the state legislature redrew city boundaries to exclude African Americans. Case was brought by Charles Goode Gomillion as plaintiff and was decided by the U.S. Supreme Court against the gerrymandering. The case established a basis for the Voting Rights Act.
- Johnny Ford, 1972–1996, 2004–2008, 2012–2016; first African American mayor
- Lucenia Williams Dunn, an African American, was elected in 2000 and was the first woman to serve as mayor of Tuskegee
- Lawrence F. Haygood Jr (2016–present)

== See also ==
- Tuskegee history
