= Mayor of Ilagan =

Local chief executives of Ilagan, Isabela, Philippines

- Incumbent; Josemarie L. Diaz since June 30, 2019
- Appointer: Elected via popular vote
- Term length: 3 years
- Formation: 1904

The mayor of Ilagan (Filipino: Punong Lungsod ng Ilagan) is the head of the local government of the city of Ilagan, Isabela who is elected to three year terms. The Mayor is also the executive head and leads the city's departments in executing the city ordinances and improving public services. The city mayor is restricted to three consecutive terms, totaling nine years, although a mayor can be elected again after an interruption of one term.

There were 28 municipal mayors during its period as a municipality since 1904. The first elected city mayor was Josemarie L. Diaz in 2013.

== Mayors ==
Like all local government heads in the Philippines, the mayor is elected via popular vote, and may not be elected for a fourth consecutive term (although the former mayor may return to office after an interval of one term). In case of death, resignation or incapacity, the vice mayor becomes the mayor.

=== Municipal Mayors (1904-2011) ===
The years 1999 and 2012 were a transition period to Ilagan cityhood but the former was failed and latter was a huge success.

	Mayor	Term
1	Rafael Maramag	1904–1906
2	Gabriel Maramag	1907–1909
3	Pascual Paguirigan	1910–1912
4	Felix Paggabao	1913–1918
5	Vicente Castro	1919–1921
6	Alfonso Azurin	1922–1924
7	Maciano Salinas	1925–1927
8	Eliseo Cabasal	1928–1931
9	Domingo Dauigoy	1931–1933
10	Casimiro Claravall	1934–1935
11	Maximo Teves	1936
12	Rafael Paguirigan	1937–1940
13	Geronimo Ventura	1941–1942
14	Marcelo Belleza	1943–1944
15	Leandro Alvarez	1945
16	Antonio Miranda	1946
17	Fidel Querubin	1945–1947
18	Andres Malana	1948
19	Felipe Mamuri	1948–1953
20	Manuel Andres	1953–1955
21	Ricardo Paguirigan	1956–1959; 1961–1965; 1965–1969; 1969–1973; 1973–1976
22	Venancio Gañgan	1960–1961
23	Manuel Binag	1976–1980; 1980–1986
24	Bonifacio Uy	1986–1988; 1988–1989
25	Jose Añes	1989–1992
26	Mercedes Pua Uy	1992–1995; 1995–1998; 1998–2001
27	Delfinito Calimag Albano	2001–2004; 2004–2006
28	Josemarie Laggui Diaz	2006–2007*; 2007–2010; 2010–2013

Vice Mayor Josemarie L. Diaz filled the remainder of the late Mayor Delfinito C. Albano's tenure from 2006 to 2007, when the latter was shot and killed in Quezon City in 2006.

=== City Mayors (2012-Present) ===
	Mayor	Term
1	Josemarie L Diaz	2013–2016; 2019–2022; 2022–2025; 2025–present
2	Evelyn C. Diaz	2016–2019

== Vice mayors ==
The vice mayor is the second-highest official of the city. The vice mayor is elected via popular vote; although most mayoral candidates have running mates, the vice mayor is elected separately from the mayor. This can result in the mayor and the vice mayor coming from different political parties.

The vice mayor is the presiding officer of the Ilagan City Council, although they can only vote as the tiebreaker. When a mayor is removed from office, the vice mayor becomes the mayor until the next election is scheduled.

	Vice mayor	Term
1	Vedasto D. Villanueva	2010–2019
2	Kirylle S. Bello	2019–2025
3	Jay Eveson C. Diaz	2025–present

== Council ==
Ilagan City Council currently composed of 10 councilors elected city-wide.

The council is responsible for creating laws and ordinances under the jurisdiction of the city of Ilagan. The mayor can veto proposed bills, but the council can override it with a two-thirds supermajority.

=== Councilors ===
These are the current city councilors serving their respective terms from 2025 until 2028.

- Rachel Villanueva
- Kit Bello
- Harold Olalia
- Joji Borromeo
- Lillian Bringas
- Antonio Manaligod Jr.
- Rolly Tugade
- Perly Gaoiran
- Gaylor Malunay
- Bic-Bic Albano

=== Ex-officio ===
- Gaylor M. Malunay
- Errol John R. Nebalasca

=== Sectoral representatives ===
Sectoral representatives are people or organizations that speak for particular segments of a society or economy in terms of issues, concerns, and points of view. Different factors, including industry, vocation, social group, or demographic category, might be used to identify these sectors. Advocate for the needs and priorities of their specific sector throughout decision-making processes is the responsibility of sectoral representatives, whether in corporate, governmental, or organizational settings.

Currently, these are the sectoral representatives in the city of Ilagan:

- Women: Evelyn C. Diaz
- Indigenous: Perlita G. Gaoiran
- Trade and Industry:
- Labor Group: Antonio T. Manaligod Jr.

== Barangay officials ==
Both the Liga ng mga Barangay (LNB) or the Association of Barangay Captains (ABC) and the Sangguniang Kabataan (SK) presidents are considered members of the Ilagan City Council (ex-officio) representing the barangay and the youth (kabataan) sectors, respectively, as follows:

- Liga ng mga Barangay (LNB) President: Gaylor M. Malunay
- Sangguniang Kabataan (SK) Federation President: Errol John R. Nebalasca
