= List of mayors of La Chaux-de-Fonds =

This is a list of mayors of the city of La Chaux-de-Fonds, Switzerland. Since 1936, the executive of the city of La Chaux-de-Fonds is its Conseil communal with a presiding member, the Président du Conseil communal. Since 2004, the presidency changes annually.

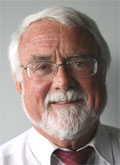
Francis Matthey was mayor from 1980 to 1988

Coat of arms of La Chaux-de-Fonds

Mayor of La-Chaux-de-Fonds
Term	Mayor	Lifespan	Party	Notes
1892–1894	Léopold Maire			
1895–1911	Paul Mosimann	(1858–1923)		
1912–1916	Justin Stauffer			
1917–1918	Paul Mosimann	(1858–1923)		
1918–1924	Justin Stauffer			
1924–1936	Paul Stähli			
1936–1948	Hermann Guinand	(1883–1985)		
1948–1959	Gaston Schelling			
1959–1960	Marcel Itten			
1960–1970	André Sandoz	(1911–2006)		
1970–1980	Maurice Payot	(1921–2003)		
1980–1988	Francis Matthey	(born 1942)	PSS	
1988–2004	Charles Augsburger	(born 1942)		
2004/2005	Claudine Stähli-Wolf		POP	
2005/2006	Didier Berberat	(born 1956)	PSS	
2006/2007	Pierre Hainard		UDC	
2007/2008	Laurent Kurth	(born 1967)	PSS	
2008/2009	Jean-Pierre Veya		POP	
2009/2010	Didier Berberat	(born 1956)	PSS	
2010/2011	Laurent Kurth	(born 1967)	PSS	
2011/2012	Pierre-André Monnard		PLR	
2012/2013	Jean-Pierre Veya		POP	
2013	Jean-Charles Legrix		UDC	
2013/2014	Pierre-André Monnard		PLR	
2014/2015	Nathalie Schallenberger		Verts	
2015/2016	Théo Huguenin-Elie		PSS	
2016/2017	Sylvia Morel		PLR	
2017/2018	Théo Huguenin-Elie		PSS	
2018/2019	Katia Babey		PSS	
2019/2020	Théo Bregnard		POP	
2020/2021	Théo Huguenin-Elie		PSS	
2021/2022	Théo Bregnard		POP	
