= List of mayors of Brig-Glis =

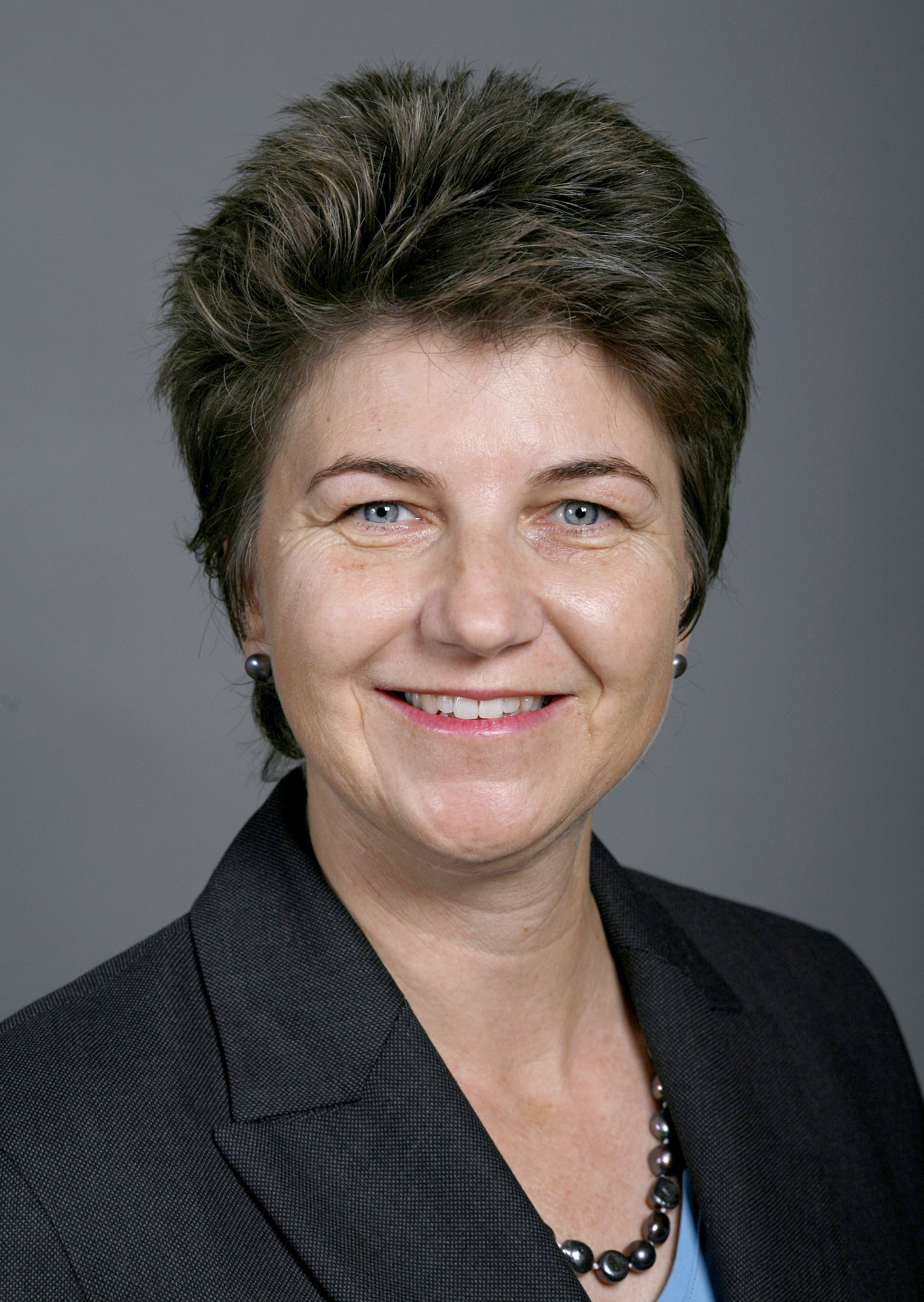
Viola Amherd, mayor 2001–2012

Coat of arms of Brig-Glis

This is a list of mayors of Brig-Glis, Valais, Switzerland. The mayor (Stadtpräsident or Präsident) of Brig-Glis chairs the city council (Stadtrat).

Brig-Glis was formed in 1973, through the merger of the municipalities of Brig, Glis and Brigerbad.

Mayor of Brig-Glis
| Term | Mayor | Lifespan | Party | Notes |
|---|---|---|---|---|
| 1973–1984 | Werner Perrig | (born 1927) | CVP/PDC | previously mayor of Brig (1967–1972) |
| 1984–1995 | Rolf Escher | (born 1941) | CVP/PDC | |
| 1996–2000 | Peter Planche | (born 1940) | FDP/PRD | |
| 2001–2012 | Viola Amherd | (born 1962) | CVP/PDC | |
| 2013–present | Louis Ursprung | (born 1949) | independent | |

For earlier mayors, see:

- List of mayors of Brig
