= List of mayors of Saratoga Springs, New York =

This is a list of mayors of the city of Saratoga Springs, New York. Mayors have been sworn in on the first day of the year of even-numbered years. Saratoga Springs was incorporated as a city in 1915.

== Mayors ==
Name	Start	End	Party	Notes
Walter P. Butler	1916			Walter P. Butler was the first Mayor of the newly incorporated (1915) City of Saratoga Springs, New York.
Harry E. Pettee	1918	1919	non-partisan	Pettee was also president of General Carbonic Gas Company. He disappeared in 1923 with $300,000 (approximately $5,441,000 today) from his company.
James D. McNulty	1920	1923	non-partisan	
Clarence H. Knapp	1924	1927	Democratic	One term.
William D. Eddy	1928	1931	Democratic	Two terms
Henry J. Schrade Jr.	1932	1935	Republican	Family of Florists business
Addison Mallery	1936	1959	non-partisan	Eight terms
James E. Benton	1960	1963	non-partisan	
Arthur J. Kearney	1964	1965	?	
James A. Murphy, Jr.	1966	1969	non-partisan	Two terms; attorney; son-in-law of U.S. Congressman Carleton J. King; son of James A. Murphy, Chief Clerk of Marine & Aviation NYC; father of former Saratoga County District Attorney James A. Murphy III who is presently the Saratoga County Judge]
Sarto J. Smaldone	1970	1973	?	Owned Malta Drive-In
Raymond Watkin	1974	1979	Democratic	Three terms; namesake of Raymond Watkin Apartments
Ellsworth J. Jones	1980	1989	Republican	He served for five terms. He was born on January 6, 1918, in Corinth, New York. He died on December 31, 2006.
Almeda C. Dake	1990	1995	Republican	Family of founders of Stewart's Shops, which is headquartered in Saratoga Springs
J. Michael O'Connell	1996	1999	Republican	Two terms
Kenneth Klotz	2000	2003	Democratic	Two terms
Michael A. Lenz	2004	2005	Republican	One term
Valerie Keehn	2006	2007	Democratic	One term
Scott T. Johnson	2008	2013	Republican	Three terms
Joanne Yepsen	2014	2017	Democratic	
Meg Kelly	2018	2021	Democratic	
Ronald J. Kim	2022	2023	Democratic	
John Safford	2024		Republican	John Safford is the mayor of Saratoga Springs, New York. He was sworn in on January 1, 2024.
