= Compostela, Cebu =

Municipality in Cebu, Philippines

Compostela
- Municipality
- Municipality of Compostela
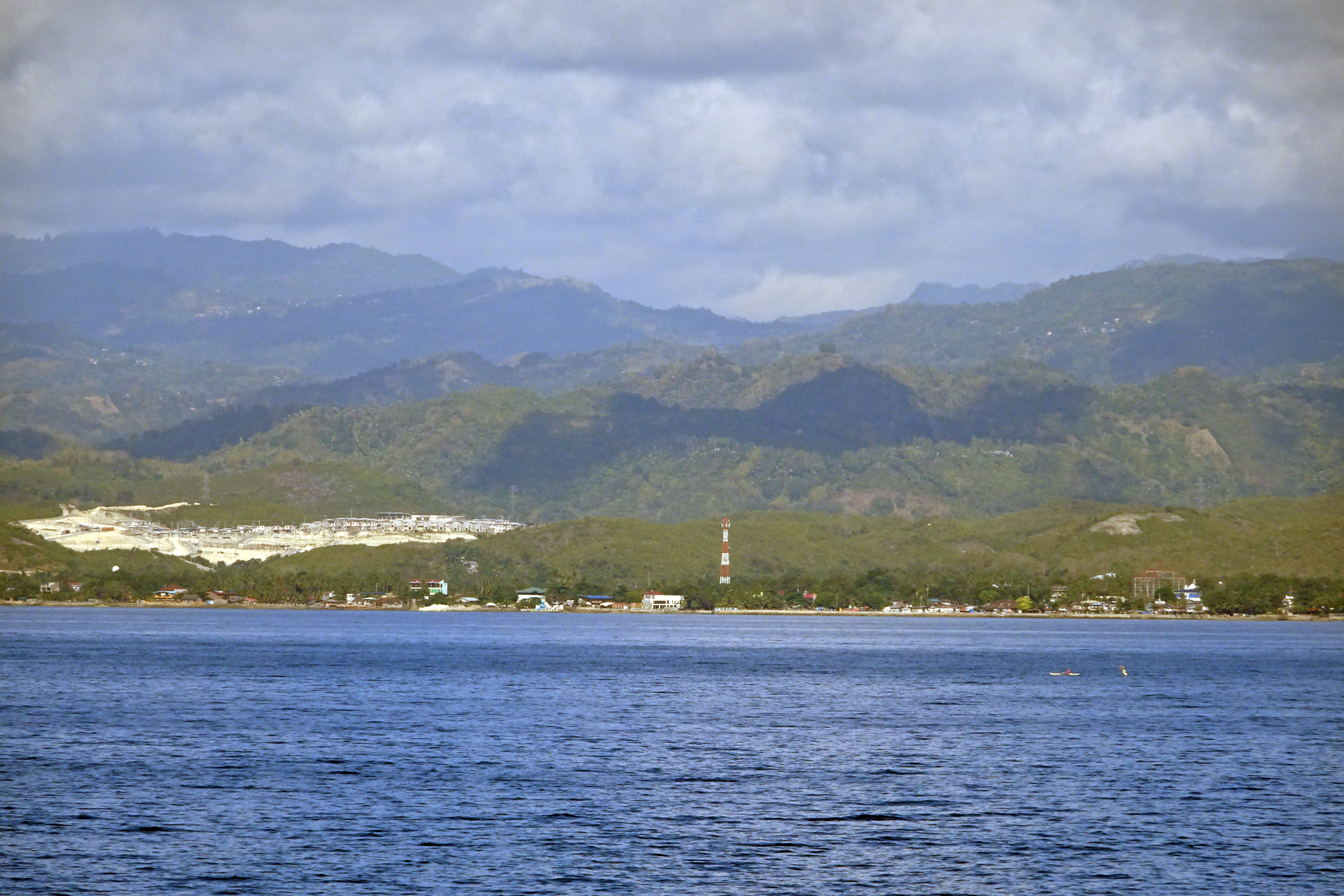
- Compostela skyline

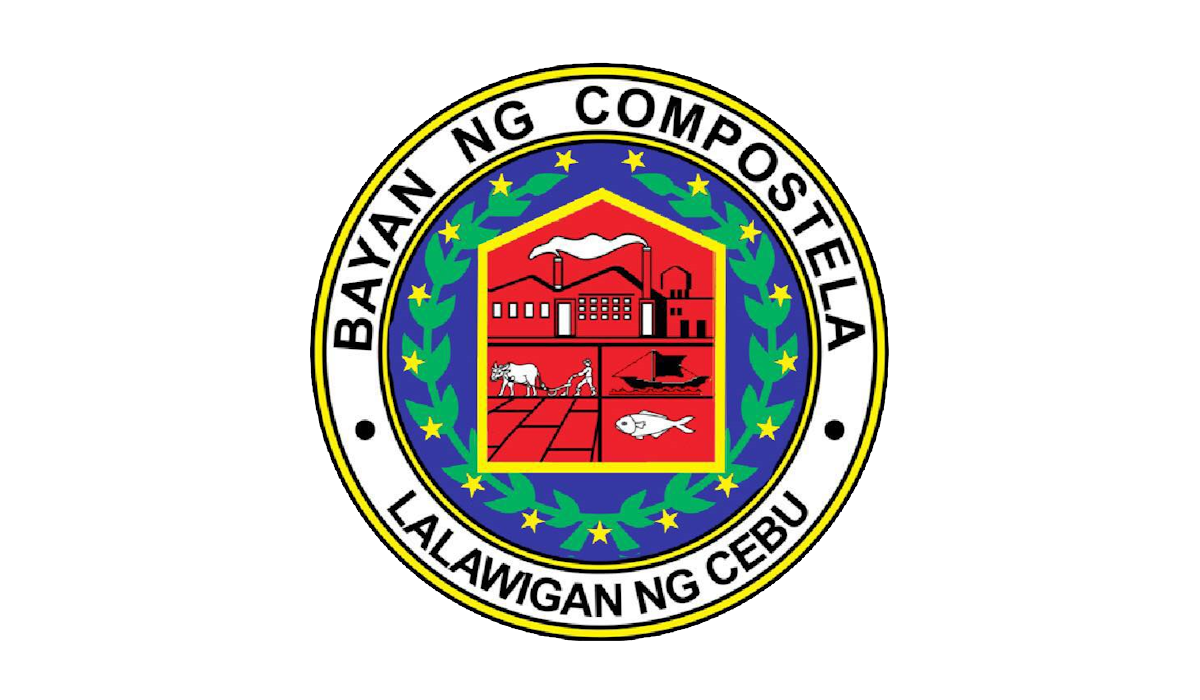
- Flag
- Anthem: Mabuhi Ka Compostela; English: Long Live Compostela
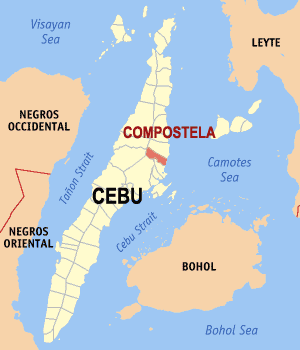
- Map of Cebu with Compostela highlighted
- Interactive map of Compostela
- Location within the Philippines
- Coordinates: 10°28′N 123°58′E
- Country: Philippines
- Region: Central Visayas
- Province: Cebu
- District: 5th district
- Founded Chartered: 26 December 1878; 17 January 1919
- Barangays: 17 (see Barangays)

Government
  - Type: Sangguniang Bayan
  - Mayor: Felijur P. Quiño
  - Vice Mayor: Froilan Quiño
  - Representative: Vincent Franco D. Frasco
  - Municipal Council: Members: Wendell T. Castro; Glenn A. Villaceran; Josephine T. Abing; Erne Q. Lawas; Cheryl O. Sereño; Rodrigo B. Puebla; Arnito C. Oliverio; Richard C. Acaso
  - Electorate: 39,513 voters (2025)

Area
  - Total: 53.90 km^{2} (20.81 sq mi)
- Elevation: 35 m (115 ft)
- Highest elevation: 335 m (1,099 ft)
- Lowest elevation: 0 m (0 ft)

Population (2024 census)
  - Total: 58,178
  - Density: 1,079/km^{2} (2,796/sq mi)
  - Households: 13,612

Economy
  - Income class: 1st municipal income class
  - Poverty incidence: 19.67% (2023)
  - Revenue: ₱ 274.6 million (2024)
  - Assets: ₱ 979.9 million (2024)
  - Expenditure: ₱ 136.5 million (2024)
  - Liabilities: ₱ 284.9 million (2024)

Service provider
  - Electricity: Cebu 2 Electric Cooperative (CEBECO 2)
- Time zone: UTC+8 (PST)
- ZIP code: 6003
- PSGC: 072218000
- IDD : area code: +63 (0)32
- Native languages: Cebuano; Tagalog

Compostela, officially the Municipality of Compostela (Cebuano: Lungsod sa Compostela; Tagalog: Bayan ng Compostela), is a municipality in the province of Cebu, Philippines. According to the 2024 census, it has a population of 58,178 people.

Compostela is within the Metro Cebu area.

== History ==
In the year 1844, Spanish authorities established local government units on the northern part of Cebu starting from what is now known as the town of Compostela as far north as what is now called the town of Borbon. Compostela was among the early barrios of the Danao. The newly established barrio was named Compostela on the suggestion of Roman Catholic friar, Fr. Manuel Alonzo, who came from the town of Ibdes in Spain and brought along with him the image of Compostela’s patron saint, St. James the Great.

Adopting the said saint as the local patron, a parish chapel was built from light materials. As the population grew, the Spanish church authorities decided to elevate the chapel into a church so that in the year 1866 the Catholic Church was constructed on the same site. Up to present time, the same structure continues to be the major place of worship in Compostela.

At the turn of the 20th century, the Americans gained control over the Philippines when they defeated the Spaniards in the Battle of Manila Bay. As a consequence, the Treaty of Paris caused the reorganization and reclassification of all local government units in the country according to their population and income. The reorganization which took place in 1903 resulted in the secession of Compostela to Liloan. In 1919, Compostela became a municipality.

=== Battle of Guila Guila ===
The Battle of Guila-guila was a significant event that took place in Barangay Bagalnga, Compostela, Cebu during World War II. On March 5, 1943, Japanese forces under General Sosaku Suzuki were ambushed by Filipino guerillas led by Lt. Agapito "Pete" Admana, under the command of Major Fabian Sanchez. The ambush was successful and inflicted heavy casualties against the invading forces. The guerillas had planned the ambush for a long time, suspecting that the Japanese soldiers' objective was to invade their general headquarters located in Barangay Tabunan in Cebu City.

Witnesses reported that three machine guns were already in position and foxholes were dug for cover. The fighting started around 2:00 pm, and the guerillas retreated because they were running out of bullets and ammunition. The exact number of casualties on the enemy side is unknown, but official reports account for 232 dead bodies. Some witnesses reported truckloads of dead bodies being transported, and Japanese forces bombarded the area and burned down houses in retaliation. One of the guerillas who participated in the ambush was Jose Bobo, who was later murdered by men in uniform for allegedly supporting the New People's Army.

=== The Capture of Governor Hilario Abellana ===
Hilario "Dodong" Abellana was the Governor of Cebu during the Japanese occupation of the Philippines in World War II. He was captured by the Japanese on September 3, 1944, while hiding in the Libo hills of Cabadiangan, Compostela. Abellana had previously escaped capture multiple times and was actively involved with the resistance movement in Cebu. Abellana had just returned from Bohol and was passing through the area en route to the mountains when he was caught at early dawn. Despite his efforts to resist the Japanese, he was ultimately executed on January 15, 1945, at the University of the Philippines Cebu campus. Efforts to locate Abellana's remains were exhaustive but unsuccessful.

=== The Estaca Bay Fight ===
On October 31, 1944, a group of 33 Japanese soldiers docked their sailboats on the shores of Barangay Estaca, Compostela, the first day of American bombing of Japanese headquarters in Cebu. They were not able to go beyond the seashore as they died in the hands of the guerrillas led by Democrito Mendoza, whose family owns what is now the Stakili Beach resort. In October 1942, he led 60 soldiers, some of them from Liloan and Compostela, in the offensive operation. They killed 50 Japanese soldiers before retreating to the mountains.

== Geography ==
Compostela is bordered on the north by the city of Danao, to the west by Cebu City, on the east by the Camotes Sea, and on the south by the town of Liloan. It is 25 kilometres (16 mi) from Cebu City.

=== Barangays ===
Compostela is politically subdivided into 17 barangays. Each barangay consists of puroks and some have sitios.

PSGC	Barangay	Population			±% p.a.	
		2024		2010		
072218001	Bagalnga	3.9%	2,283	1,922	▴	1.20%
072218002	Basak	3.0%	1,773	1,695	▴	0.31%
072218003	Buluang	2.3%	1,365	1,259	▴	0.56%
072218004	Cabadiangan	3.9%	2,284	2,111	▴	0.55%
072218005	Cambayog	2.2%	1,283	1,165	▴	0.67%
072218006	Canamucan	7.5%	4,345	4,058	▴	0.48%
072218007	Cogon	12.6%	7,357	5,517	▴	2.02%
072218008	Dapdap	2.1%	1,212	1,151	▴	0.36%
072218009	Estaca	10.9%	6,327	5,177	▴	1.40%
072218010	Lupa	1.5%	873	812	▴	0.50%
072218011	Magay	4.1%	2,391	2,539	▾	−0.42%
072218012	Mulao	2.8%	1,600	1,538	▴	0.28%
072218013	Panangban	1.9%	1,104	1,125	▾	−0.13%
072218014	Poblacion	17.8%	10,372	9,536	▴	0.59%
072218015	Tag‑ube	2.1%	1,250	1,203	▴	0.27%
072218016	Tamiao	2.6%	1,533	1,225	▴	1.57%
072218017	Tubigan	0.9%	546	541	▴	0.06%
	Total		58,178	42,574	▴	2.19%

=== Climate ===
Climate data for Compostela, Cebu
Month	Jan	Feb	Mar	Apr	May	Jun	Jul	Aug	Sep	Oct	Nov	Dec	Year
Mean daily maximum °C (°F)	28 (82)	28 (82)	29 (84)	31 (88)	31 (88)	30 (86)	29 (84)	30 (86)	29 (84)	29 (84)	29 (84)	28 (82)	29 (85)
Mean daily minimum °C (°F)	22 (72)	22 (72)	23 (73)	23 (73)	25 (77)	25 (77)	24 (75)	24 (75)	24 (75)	24 (75)	23 (73)	23 (73)	24 (74)
Average precipitation mm (inches)	70 (2.8)	49 (1.9)	62 (2.4)	78 (3.1)	138 (5.4)	201 (7.9)	192 (7.6)	185 (7.3)	192 (7.6)	205 (8.1)	156 (6.1)	111 (4.4)	1,639 (64.6)
Average rainy days	13.4	10.6	13.1	14.5	24.2	27.9	28.4	27.7	27.1	27.4	22.5	15.9	252.7
Source: Meteoblue (modeled/calculated data, not measured locally)

== Demographics ==
Population census of Compostela
Year	Pop.	±% p.a.
1903	5,602	—
1939	9,441	+1.46%
1948	8,411	−1.28%
1960	11,862	+2.91%
1970	13,931	+1.62%
1975	15,506	+2.17%
1980	17,504	+2.45%
1990	22,006	+2.32%
1995	26,499	+3.54%
2000	31,446	+3.74%
2007	39,167	+3.07%
2010	42,574	+3.08%
2015	47,898	+2.27%
2020	55,874	+3.30%
2024	58,178	+0.97%
Source: Philippine Statistics Authority

== Economy ==
Poverty incidence of Compostela (%)

Source: Philippine Statistics Authority
