= List of mayors of New Castle, Indiana =

This is a list of mayors of New Castle, Indiana.

#	Name	Term start	Term end	Party	Comments
1	Mark E. Forkner	1909	1910	Republican	
2	George M. Barnard	1910	1913	Republican	
3	J. Leb Watkins	1914	1917	Republican	
4	George A. Elliott	1918	1921	Republican	
5	John M. Morris	1922	1925	Republican	
6	Stod Hayes	1926	1929	Democratic	
7	Sidney E. Baker (1st)	1930	1938	Democratic	Namesake of Baker Park
8	Sam J. Bufkin	1939	1942	Republican	
9	Sidney E. Baker (2nd)	1943	1947	Democratic	
10	Harold L. Meadows	1948	1951	Democratic	
11	Paul F. McCormack	1952	1955	Republican	
12	Sidney E. Baker (3rd)	1956	1959	Democratic	
13	Walter V. Falck	1960	1963	Democratic	
14	Paul G. Osborne	1964	1971	Democratic	Namesake of Osborne Park
15	Scott Bouslog	1972	1975	Democratic	
16	Gary Marcum	1976	1979	Democratic	
17	Gerald "Bud" Ayers	1980	1991	Democratic	Park superintendent, 2003–2007
18	Sherman Boles	1992	2003	Democratic	3-term mayor, ran for a fourth term in 2003 and 2007
19	Tom Nipp	2004	December 31, 2007	Democratic	Defeated in the 2007 primary by Sherman Boles
20	James L. Small	January 1, 2008	December 31, 2011	Republican	
21	Greg York	January 1, 2012	Present	Democratic	

== Sources ==
- Ratcliff, Richard Pickering (1999). Henry County At The Millennium: A Reference Book of History, Firsts, Trivia, Lists and Interesting Facts. New Castle, Indiana:Henry County Historical Society.
