= List of mayors of Le Châtelard, Vaud =

This is a list of mayors of Le Châtelard, Switzerland. Le Châtelard or "Le Châtelard-Montreux" is a former municipality of the canton of Vaud. From 1953, its name was "Montreux-Le Châtelard". It merged in 1962 with Montreux-Planches to form Montreux.

Mayor (syndic) of Le Châtelard
Term	Mayor	Lifespan	Party	Notes
1868–1886	Louis Mayor-Vautier	(1832–1896)		
1887–1901	Emile Vuichoud	(1856–1906)		
1901–1912	Alexandre Emery	(1850–1931)		
1914–1925	Marius Nicollier	(1872–1950)		
1926–1931	Paul Kues	(1867–1931)		
1931–1941	Ulysse Cochard	(1883–1956)		
1942–1946	Edmond Jacquet	(1891–1979)		
1946–1961	Alfred Vogelsang	(born 1905)		Last mayor of Le Châtelard, first mayor of Montreux

For later mayors, see:

- List of mayors of Montreux
