= List of mayors of Floral Park, New York =

This is a list of mayors of Floral Park, New York.

Floral Park became an incorporated village in 1908 with John Lewis Childs as president. In 1927, the title of President was changed to Mayor.

- Clifford H. Oldaker (1927–1929)
- John McNeill (1929–1938)
- Frederick H. Heidtmann (1940–1944)
- Raymond I. Bundrick (1947–1949)
- Walter D. Lawrence (1951–1954)
- William N. Lewis (1955–1957)
- Leslie W. Carpenter (1959)
- George Farrell (1965)
- Joseph H. Driscoll (1969)
- Henry W. Dwyer (1974–1976)
- Steven Corbett (1995–2001)
- Ann Corbett (2001–2004)
- Phil Guarnieri (2004–2009)
- Kevin Greene (2009–2011)
- Thomas Tweedy (2011–2017)
- Dominick Longobardi (2017–2021)
- Kevin M. Fitzgerald (2021–present)
