= List of mayors of Montreux =

Coat of arms of Montreux

This is a list of mayors of Montreux, Vaud, Switzerland. The mayor (syndic) of Montreux chairs the seven-member municipal council (Municipalité).

Montreux was formed in 1962, through the merger of the municipalities of Montreux-Châtelard ("Le Châtelard") and Montreux-Planches ("Les Planches").

Mayor (syndic) of Montreux
Term	Mayor	Lifespan	Party	Notes
1962–1969	Alfred Vogelsang	(born 1905)		previously mayor of Montreux-Châtelard
1969–1988	Jean-Jacques Cevey	(born 1928)	PRD/FDP	
-1996	Frédy Alt			
1996–2011	Pierre Salvi	(born 1957)	PSS/SPS	
2011–2021	Laurent Wehrli	(born 1965)	PLR	
2021–present	Olivier Gfeller	(born 1967)	PSS/SPS	

For earlier mayors, see:

- List of mayors of Le Châtelard, Vaud
- List of mayors of Les Planches
