= List of mayors of Palm Bay, Florida =

The Mayor of Palm Bay, Florida is the presiding officer at city council meetings and the official head of the City of Palm Bay, Florida for all ceremonial occasions. The current mayor of Palm Bay, is Rob Medina.

Name	Elected	End of term	Comments
William Knecht	June 2, 1924	April 1928	Incorporated as a town in 1926, dissolved on May 9, 1929
Alexander J. Goode			
Harry Pollak	September 14, 1956, November 5, 1957, November 4, 1958, November 3, 1959	November 8, 1960	Town incorporated September 14, 1956, City incorporated January 16, 1960
Ralph A. Stearns	November 8, 1960, November 7, 1961, November 6, 1962, November 5, 1963	July 16, 1964	
Vincent Kirby	July 16, 1964	November 5, 1964	
Bert W. Kreinbring	November 3, 1964	November 3, 1965	
Louis A. "Tom" Burn	November 3, 1965	November 8, 1966	
David Sykes	November 8, 1966	November 7, 1967	
Don "Shorty" H. Floyd	November 7, 1967	November 26, 1969	
Daniel B. Cameron, Jr.	November 26, 1969, November 2, 1971, November 6, 1973	November 25, 1975	
Franklin T. DeGroodt	November 25, 1975, November 8, 1977, November 6, 1979	November 24, 1981	
William F. Madden	November 24, 1981	November 6, 1984	
Harold F. Bryant, Sr.	November 27, 1984	November 5, 1987	
Frank Filiberto	November 3, 1987	November 6, 1990	
Robert R. Devecki	November 6, 1990	November 2, 1993	
Melton E. Broom	November 2, 1993	November 5, 1996	
John J. Mazziotti	November 5, 1996	November 4, 1999	
Edward Geier	November 4, 1999, November 5, 2002	March 20, 2003	
Donna Brooks	March 20, 2003	May 1, 2003	Interim
John J. Mazziotti	April 29, 2003, November 8, 2005, November 4, 2008	November 20, 2012	In June 1999, Mazziotti was removed from office by then governor Jeb Bush when it was revealed that the mayor had previously served two prison sentences and did not have his civil rights restored. After having his civil rights restored, he ran again for the City Council and won. He ran unopposed for mayor in 2005 and 2008. He was the city's longest-serving mayor.
William Capote	November 6, 2012	November 2020	
Rob Medina	November 2020	Present	
