= Dieter Salomon =

German politician

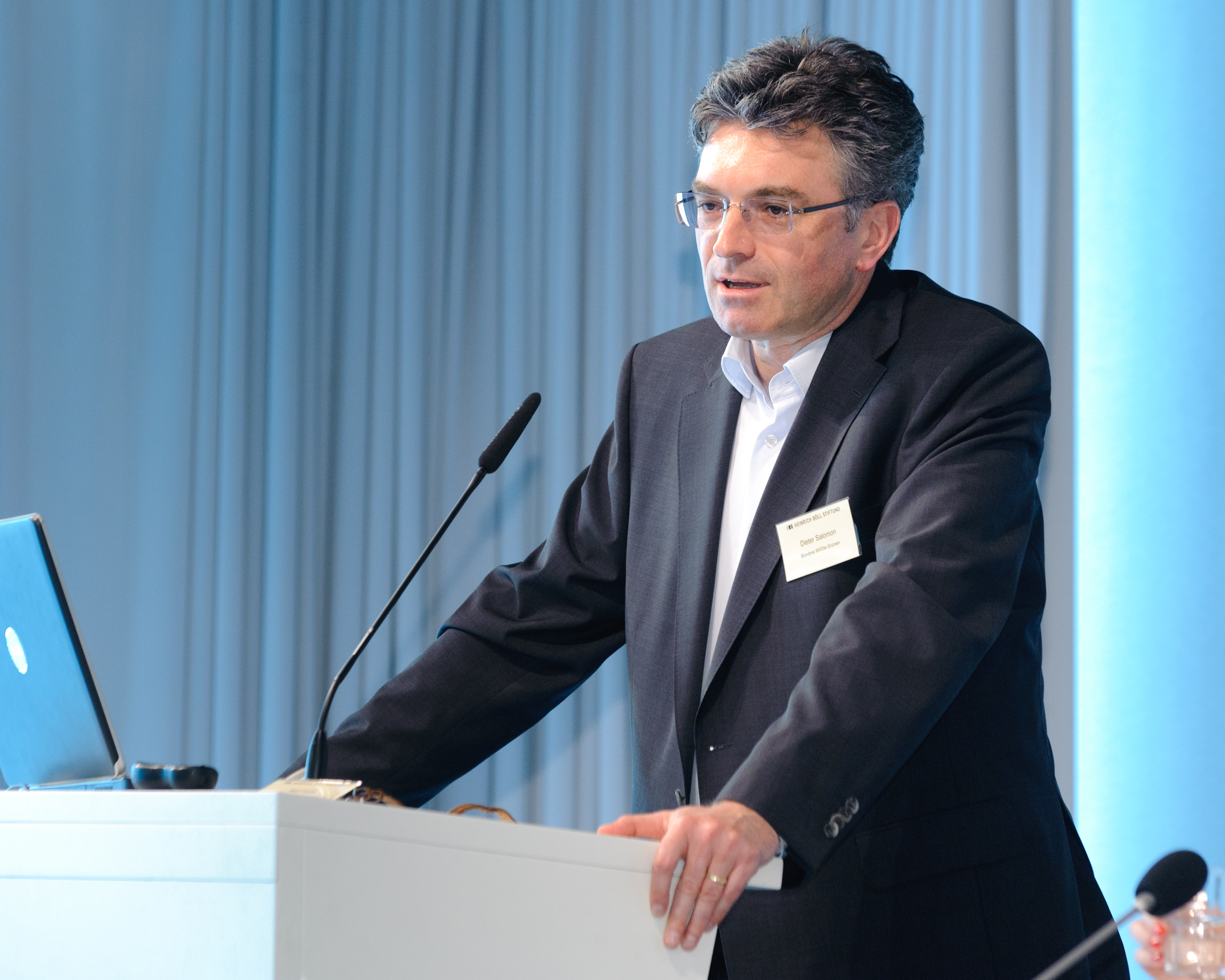
- Salomon in 2011

Mayor of Freiburg
- In office 2002 – 30 June 2018
- Preceded by: Rolf Böhme
- Succeeded by: Martin Horn

Personal details
- Born: 9 August 1960 (age 65) Melbourne, Australia
- Party: Alliance '90/The Greens
- Spouse: Helen Hall-Salomon
- Children: 1
- Occupation: Politician, Mayor, retired from politics 30 June 2018
- Website: http://www.dieter-salomon.de (offline)

Dieter Salomon (born 9 August 1960) is a German politician of Alliance '90/The Greens who served as mayor of Freiburg im Breisgau for two terms from 2002 until 2018.

== Biography ==
Salomon grew up in the German Allgäu. He received his Abitur in 1979 in Oberstdorf, and moved to Freiburg to study Political Science, Public Finance, and Roman Philology. He received a Doctor of Philosophy degree from the University of Freiburg in 1991. During his time as a student, he became active in the local chapter of the Alliance 90/The Greens.

Salomon was married to Helen Hall-Salomon, and has one child from a previous marriage. Since 2011, he lived separated from his wife. At the end of 2015, he married his new partner in Melbourne, Helga Mayer.

== Political career ==
From 1990 until 2000, Salomon was a member of Freiburg city council, and was a member of the Landtag of Baden-Württemberg from 1992. From April 2002, he was the head of the Baden-Württemberg Green Party fraction, and lead candidate for state elections.

Salomon became mayor of Freiburg on 1 July 2002, after receiving 64.4% of votes on the second ballot held on 5 May 2002, thereby becoming the first Green mayor of a large German city, and only the second or third in the whole of Germany. Once elected mayor of Freiburg, he resigned his position in the Landtag. Within the Green Party, he is considered a Realo.

Salomon was defeated in the mayoral election of 6 May 2018 by surprise winner Martin Horn. The second round voting result was Martin Horn 44.3% - Dieter Salomon 30.7%. Martin Horn won by the 2nd round simple majority rule.

In a post declaration interview with the media, Salomon announced his retirement from politics.

Salomon served as a Green Party delegate to the Federal Convention for the purpose of electing the President of Germany in 2012.

== Other activities ==
=== Corporate boards ===
- Abfallwirtschaft und Stadtreinigung Freiburg (ASF), Ex-Officio Chairman of the Supervisory Board (2002–2018)
- Badenova, Ex-Officio Chairman of the Supervisory Board (2002–2018)
- Freiburger Stadtbau (FSB), Ex-Officio Chairman of the Supervisory Board (2002–2018)
- L-Bank, Member of the Supervisory Board (2002–2018)
- LBBW Immobilien, Member of the Supervisory Board
- Messe Freiburg, Ex-Officio Chairman of the Supervisory Board (2002–2018)

=== Non-profit organizations ===
- Grüner Wirtschaftsdialog, Member of the Advisory Board (since 2021)
- Association of German Cities, Deputy Member of the Presidium (2004–2018)
- Max Planck Institute for Foreign and International Criminal Law, Member of the Board of Trustees
- Max Planck Institute of Immunobiology and Epigenetics, Member of the Board of Trustees
- University of Freiburg, Member of the Advisory Board

== Written works ==
- Salomon, Dieter (1992). Grüne Theorie und graue Wirklichkeit: die Grünen und die Basisdemokratie (in German). Freiburg: Arnold-Bergstraesser-Institut. ISBN 978-3-928597-03-6. OCLC 32350409.
- Thaa, Winfried; Salomon, Dieter; Gräber, Gerhard (1994). Grüne an der Macht: Widerstände und Chancen grün-alternativer Regierungsbeteiligungen (in German). Cologne: Bund-Verlag. ISBN 978-3-7663-2521-1. OCLC 31605999.
