= List of mayors of Bayside =

This is a list of the mayors of the City of Bayside, a local government area in Victoria, Australia. The City of Bayside was formed in 1994.

== Commissioners (1994–1997) ==
Commissioners	Term
Douglas Clark (Chief Commissioner)	1994–1996
Heather Norling	1994–1996
Morton Browne	1994–1995
John Kent	1996

== Mayors and Deputy Mayors (1997 to present) ==
#	Year	Mayor	Deputy Mayor
1	1997–98	Graeme Disney OAM	
2	1998–99	Alex del Porto	
3	1999–00	Michael Harwood	
4	2000–01	Graeme Disney OAM	
5	2001–02	Simon Russell	
6	2002–03	Terry O'Brien	
7	2003–04	Ken Beadle	
8	2004	Alex del Porto	
9	2004–05	Craig Tucker	
10	2005–06	Derek Wilson	
11	2006–07	John Knight	
12	2007–08	Andrew McLorinan	
13	2008–09	James Long	
14	2009–10	Clifford Hayes	
15	2010–11	Alex del Porto	
16	2011–12	Louise Cooper-Shaw	
17	2012–13	Stephen Hartney	
18	2013–14	Laurence Evans OAM	
19	2014–15	Felicity Frederico OAM	
20	2015–16	James Long	
21	2016–17	Alex del Porto	James Long
22	2017–18	Laurence Evans OAM	Rob Grinter
23	2018–19	Michael Heffernan	Rob Grinter
24	2019–20	Clarke Martin	Rob Grinter
25	2020–21	Laurence Evans OAM	Sonia Castelli
26	2021–22	Alex del Porto	Hanna El Mouallam
27	2022–23	Hanna El Mouallem	Dr Jo Samuel-King
28	2023–24	Fiona Stitfold	Alex del Porto
29	2024–25	Hanna El Mouallem	Debbie Taylor-Haynes
30	2025–26	Debbie Taylor-Haynes	Andrew Hockley
31	2026–27	Debbie Taylor-Haynes	Geoff Leigh

== See also ==
- City of Bayside
- List of Town Halls in Melbourne
- Local government areas of Victoria
