= List of mayors of Peachtree City, Georgia =

This is a list of mayors of Peachtree City, Georgia, United States.

The current mayor of Peachtree City, and 12th person to be mayor, is Kim Learnard.

== List of mayors ==
The following is a list of the mayors of Peachtree City and their respective terms.

#	Name	Term start	Term end
1	Joel Cowan, Sr. (born in 1936; age 89–90)	January 1959	1965
2	Ralph N. Jones (1929–2009; age 80)	1966	1969
3	J. K. "Chip" Conner (born in 1940; age 85–86)	1970	1971
4	Howard Morgan (1912–2001; age 89)	1972	1977
5	Herb Frady (born in 1931; age 94–95)	1978	1981
6	Frederick Brown, Jr. (1921–2018; age 96)	1982	1991
7	Robert Lenox (born in 1944; age 81)	1992	2001
	Steve Brown	2002	2005
9	Harold K. Logsdon (born in 1945; age 80–81)	January 2006	December 2009
10	Don Haddix	January 2010	December 2013
11	Vanessa Fleisch (born in 1961; age 64–65)	January 2014	December 2021
12	Kim Learnard	January 2022	Present

== Mayoral elections ==
The following is a list of the dates, candidates, and results of Peachtree City's mayoral elections. (Winners are in bold.)

Date	Incumbent	Opposition
November 27, 2001	**Steve Brown**	Gary Rower
	3,171	1,946
December 6, 2005	**Harold Logsdon**	Steve Brown
	4,228 (70.07%)	1,806 (29.93%)
December 1, 2009	**Don Haddix**	Cyndi Plunkett
	3,058 (65.64%)	1,601 (34.36%)
December 3, 2013	**Vanessa Fleisch**	Harold Logsdon
	2,282 (72.15%)	881 (27.85%)
December 5, 2017	**Vanessa Fleisch**	Eric Imker
	2,361 (56.09%)	1,848 (44.91%)
