= List of mayors of Villa Alemana =

Mayor of Villa Alemana
- Coat of arms of Villa Alemana

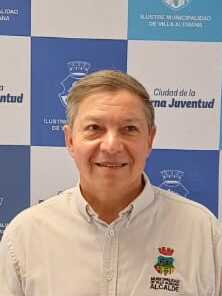
- Incumbent; Nelson Estay Molina since December 6, 2024
- Residence: Villa Alemana, Chile
- Seat: Town Hall of the Ilustre Municipalidad de Villa Alemana
- Term length: 4 years; No more than three consecutive periods
- Formation: 1918
- First holder: Alejandro Morrison
- Website: www.villalemana.cl

The following is the list of the mayors of the chilean commune of Villa Alemana since its creation in 1918, who constitutes the highest municipal authority.

== List ==
#	Name	Party	Period	Ref.
1	Alejandro Morrison		1918-1921	
2	Marcelino Sepúlveda		1921-1924	
3	Marcelino Sepúlveda		1924-1927	
4	Manuel Briceño de La Paz		1927-1928	
5	Alejandro Cavada		1933-1934	
6	Miguel Gandulfo Guerra		1934-1935	
7	Miguel Gandulfo Guerra		1935-1938	
8	Manuel López Quiroga		1938-1941	
9	Carlos Pizarro		1941-1944	
10	Raúl Cornejo Andrade		1944-1947	
11	Rodolfo Correa Retán	PR	1947-1948	
12	Carlos Páez Brandan	PCSC	1948-1950	
13	Ramón López Vargas	PS	1951-1952	
14	Carlos Páez Brandan		1952-1953	
15	Rolando Devia		May 17, 1953-July 30, 1953	
16	Enrique Hermosilla Guerra		July 30, 1953-1956	
17	Delia Julieta Salinas de López	PL	1956-1960	
18	Delia Julieta Salinas de López	PL	1960-1964	
19	Ítalo Composto Scarpati	PL	1964-1967	
20	Rodolfo Galleguillos	PDC	1967-1970	
21	Tulio Watson	PS	1971-1973	
Military Government
22	Alejandro Peralta Peña	Ind.	1973-1981	
23	Raúl Bustamante Bertoglio	Ind.	1981-1986	
24	Claudio Morales Greene	Ind.	1986-1988	(Note: For the start date of his period see: Decreto 860 NOMBRA ALCALDE EN LA MUNICIPALIDAD DE VILLA ALEMANA.: for the end date of his period see: Decreto 1936 ACEPTA RENUNCIA AL CARGO DE ALCALDE DE LA MUNICIPALIDAD DE VILLA ALEMANA.)
25	Raúl Bustamante Bertoglio	Ind.	1989-1992	
Return to democracy
26	Ramón García Gómez	PDC	1992-1996	
27	Ramón García Gómez	PDC	1996-2000	
28	Raúl Bustamante Bertoglio	Ind.	2000-2004	
29	Raúl Bustamante Bertoglio	UDI	2004-2008	
30	José Sabat Marcos	Ind.	2008-2012	
31	José Sabat Marcos	Ind.	2012-2016	
32	José Sabat Marcos	Ind.	2016-2020	
33	Javiera Toledo Muñoz	Ind.	June 28, 2021-November 16, 2024 (Note: On November 15, 2024, Javiera Toledo Muñoz resinged from her position as mayor. The resignation was accepted effective November 16, 2024 through the Decreto Alcaldicio N° 2131 of November 18, 2024, with Gloria Solis Soto acting as surrogate mayor until the election of a new mayor to complete the term. The resignation was intended to allow her to participate in the 2025 Chilean parliamentary elections.)	
34	Marcelo Góngora Carvajal	PDC	November 27, 2024-December 6, 2024	
35	Nelson Estay Molina	Ind.	2024-2028	

== See also ==
- Villa Alemana

== Sources ==
- Saavedra Pérez, Carlos (1995). Desde el Foyer del Teatro: 100 Años de Villa Alemana.
- Torres Vergara, Belarmino (1955). Historia de Villa Alemana.
