= List of mayors of Wallingford, Connecticut =

List of mayors 1962-present

Mayor of Wallingford, Connecticut
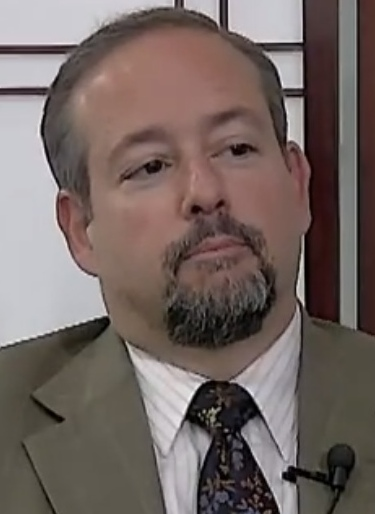
- Incumbent; Vincent Cervoni since January 1, 2024
- Type: Mayor
- Formation: 1962
- First holder: William DeForest Bertini

The following table lists the individuals who served as mayor of Wallingford, Connecticut, their political party affiliations, and their dates in office, as well as other information.

== History ==
The city of Wallingford switched from a rural town meeting - selectmen to a mayor–council government in 1962. The longest-serving mayor of Wallingford was William F. Dickinson, who was elected for 20 two-year terms, serving from 1983 and 2023.

On election day of November 7, 2023, former Town Council Chairman Vincent "Vinny" Cervoni, a Republican, defeated Democrat Riley O'Connell. Cervoni took office on January 1, 2024, becoming the fifth mayor of Wallingford. As of 2024, the job pays $96,000 per year.

== List of mayors ==
The following table lists the individuals who served as mayor of Wallingford, Connecticut.

#	Name	Party	Served	Notes
1	William DeForest Bertini	Republican	1962 – 1969	
2	Joseph C. Carini	Democratic	1969 – 1974	Died in office
3	Rocco J. Vumbaco	Democratic	1974 - 1983	
4	William F. Dickinson	Republican	1983 – 2024	
5	Vincent Cervoni	Republican	2024 –	
