= List of mayors of Wasilla, Alaska =

The following is a list of mayors of the city of Wasilla, Alaska, United States.

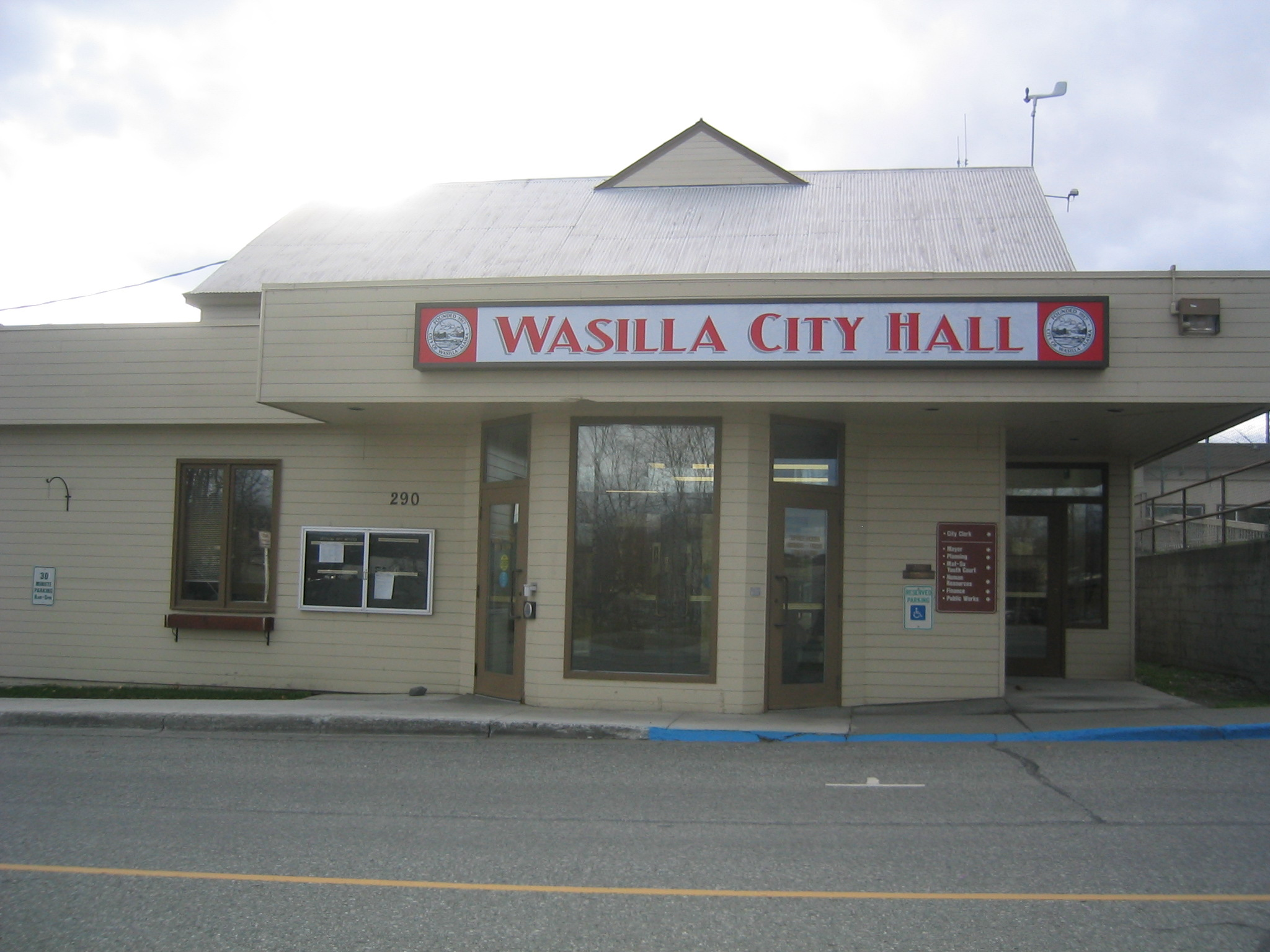
City hall building in Wasilla, Alaska (photo 2005)

- Leo M. Nunley, 1974-1976
- Elizabeth S. "Pat" Hjellen, 1976-1980
- Harold Newcomb, 1980-1983, 1986-1987
- Marilyn McGuire, 1983-1984
- Richard DeCamp, 1984-1985
- Charles H. Bumpus, 1985-1986
- Dorothy G. Page, 1986
- John C. Stein, 1987-1996
- Sarah Palin, 1996-2002
- Dianne M. Keller, 2002-2008
- Verne E. Rupright, 2008-2014
- Bert L. Cottle, 2014-2020
- Glenda Ledford, 2020-present

== See also ==
- Wasilla history
