= List of mayors of Les Planches =

This is a list of mayors of Les Planches, Switzerland. Les Planches is a former municipality of the canton of Vaud. From 1953, its name was "Montreux-Planches". It merged in 1962 with Montreux-Châtelard to form Montreux.

Mayor (syndic) of Les Planches
Term	Mayor	Lifespan	Party	Notes
1883–1890	Léon Perret	(1852–1913)		
1890–1903	Philippe Faucherre-Vautier	(1844–1932)		
1904–1917	Ernest Miauton	(1853–1942)		
1917–1922	Paul Vuilleumier	(1871–1938)		
1923–1945	Robert Maron	(1885–1951)	PLS/LPS	
1946–1961	Albert Mayer	(1890–1968)	PRD/FDP	

For later mayors, see:

- List of mayors of Montreux
