= Mayor of Kópavogur =

- Bæjarstjóri Kópavogs
- Incumbent; Ásdís Kristjánsdóttir since June 2022
- Kópavogur Town Council
- Seat: Kópavogur
- Term length: Four years Renewable indefinitely with the support of the Kopavogur Town Council.
- Constituting instrument: Local Government Act
- Formation: 1955
- First holder: Finnbogi Rútur Valdimarsson
- Website: kopavogur.is/en (in English) kopavogur.is (in Icelandic)

The post of Mayor of Kópavogur (Icelandic: Bæjarstjóri Kópavogs) was created in 1955.

== List of mayors ==
Nº	Mayor	Took office	Left office	Party
1	Finnbogi Rútur Valdimarsson (1906–1989)	1955	1957	N/A
2	Hulda Dóra Jakobsdóttir (1911–1998)	1957	1962	N/A
3	Hjálmar Ólafsson (1924–1984)	1962	1970	N/A
4	Björgvin Sæmundsson (1930–1980)	1970	1980	N/A
5	Bjarni Þór Jónsson (1946–)	1980	1982	N/A
6	Kristján Helgi Guðmundsson (1943–)	1982	1990	N/A
7	Sigurður Ásgrímur Geirdal Gíslason (1939–2004)	1990	2004	PP
8	Hansína Ásta Björgvinsdóttir (1946–)	2004	2005	PP
9	Gunnar Ingi Birgisson (1947–)	2005	2009	IP
10	Gunnsteinn Sigurðsson (1950–)	2009	2010	IP
11	Guðrún Pálsdóttir (1956–)	June 2010	February 2012	N/A
12	Ármann Kristinn Ólafsson (1966–)	February 2012	June 2022	IP
13	Ásdís Kristjánsdóttir (1978–)	June 2022	Incumbent	IP
