= List of mayors of Glen Eira =

This is a list of the mayors of the City of Glen Eira, a local government area in Melbourne, Australia. The City of Glen Eira was formed in 1994 with the amalgamation of the City of Caulfield and parts of the City of Moorabbin Victoria, Australia.

== Mayors (1996 to present) ==
#	Mayor	Term
1	Alain Grossbard JP	1997–1998
2	Barry Neve JP	1998–1999
3	Norman Kennedy	1999–2000
4	Veronika Martens	2000–2001
5	Noel Erlich	2001–2002
6	Peter Goudge JP	2002–2003
7	Dorothy Marwick	2003–2004
8	Bob Bury	2004
9	Margaret Esakoff	2004–2005
10	David Feldman	2005–2006
11	Margaret Esakoff	2006–2007
12	Steven Tang	2007–2008
13	Helen Whiteside	2008–2009
14	Steven Tang	2009–2010
15	Margaret Esakoff/Jamie Hyams	2010–2011
16/17	Jamie Hyams	2011–2013
18	Neil Pilling	2013–2014
19	Jim Magee	2014–2015
20	Neil Pilling	2015–2016
21	Mary Delahunty	2016–2017
22	Tony Athanasopoulos	2017–2018
23	Jamie Hyams	2018–2019
24/25	Margaret Esakoff	2019–2021
26/27	Jim Magee	2021–2023
28	Anne-Marie Cade	2023–2024
29/30	Simone Zmood	2024–2026

== Deputy Mayors (2006 to present) ==
#	Deputy mayor	Term
1	David Feldman	2006–2007
2	Margaret Esakoff	2007–2008
3	Steven Tang	2009
4	Helen Whiteside	2010
5	Margaret Esakoff	2010
6	Jamie Hyams	2011
7	Neil Pilling	2012
8	Oscar Lobo	2012–3
9	Michael Lipshutz	2013–4
10	Mary Delahunty	2014–5
11	Karina Okotel (resigned April 2016), Thomas Sounness	2015–6
12	Jim Magee	2016–7
13	Jamie Hyams	2017–8
14	Joel Silver	2018–9
15	Dan Sztrajt	2019–20
16	Jim Magee	2020–21
17	Li Zhang	2021–22
18	Anne-Marie Cade	2022–23
19	Simone Zmood	2023–24
20	Luca Ragni	2024–25
21	Li Zhang	2025–26

== See also ==
- City of Glen Eira
- Glen Eira Town Hall
- List of town halls in Melbourne
- Local government areas of Victoria
