= Martin Horn (politician) =

Mayor of Freiburg im Breisgau

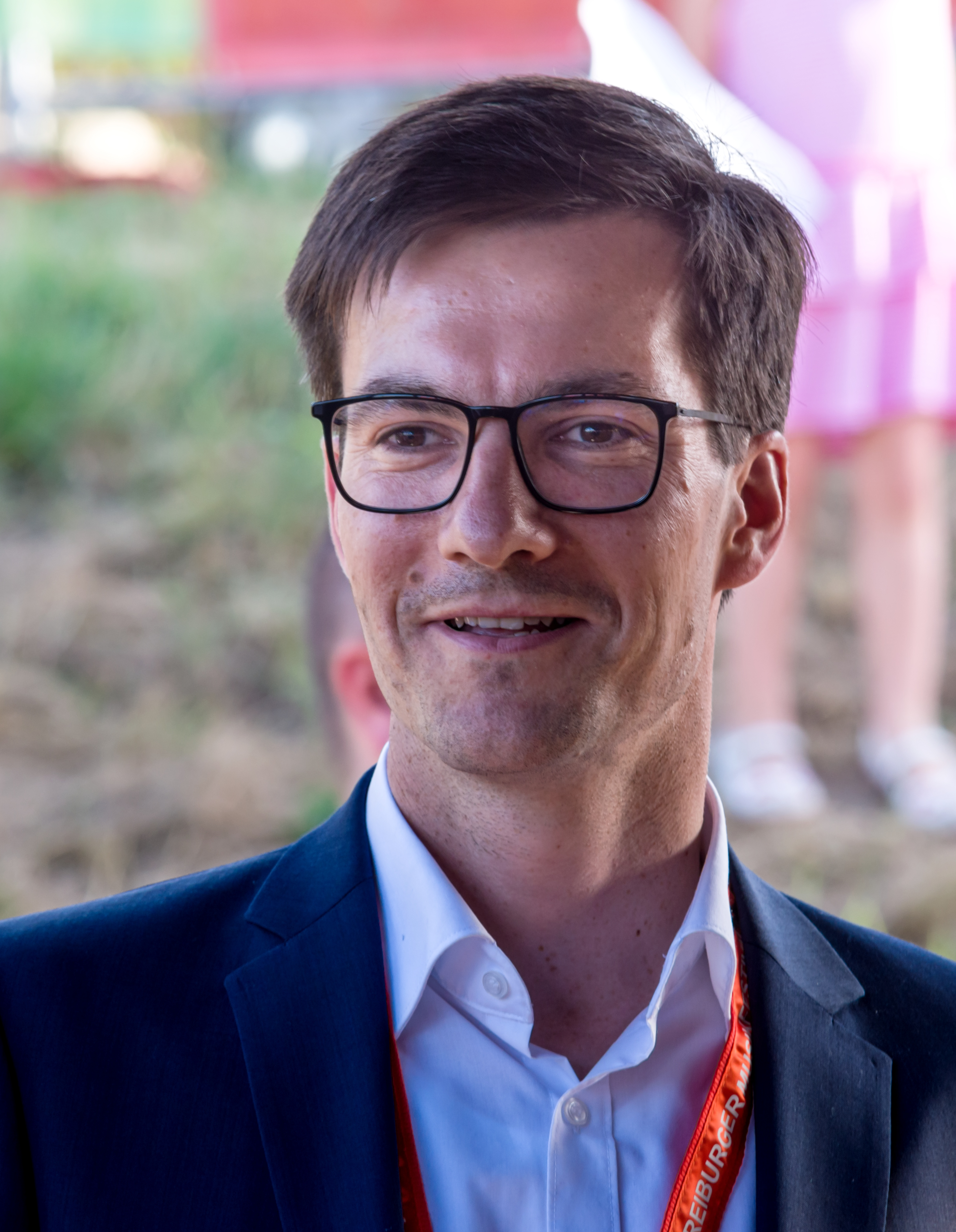

Martin Werner Walter Horn (né Hoffmann; born November 7, 1984) is a German politician. In 2018 he became mayor (Oberbürgermeister) of Freiburg im Breisgau.

== Early life ==
Horn was born in Annweiler am Trifels. He was the son of a Protestant pastor and grew up with his three sisters in a clergy house in Hornbach. He was engaged in church youth work from an early age, acting as a youth leader in the association "Feuer und Flamme" as part of the Hornbach church community. In 2009, Horn began studying international social work at the Protestant University Ludwigsburg and finished his bachelor's degree in 2013. Following these studies, in 2014 he earned a master's degree in European and world politics at City University of Applied Sciences in Bremen. He studied abroad in Botswana, Jordan, Georgia, Russia and Ukraine. In 2014 he started working as the coordinator for Europe and development in the Sindelfingen city administration and as a free-lance docent at Protestant University Ludwigsburg.

== Career ==
In 2018, Horn ran for mayor of Freiburg im Breisgau without party affiliation. The SPD and the voter initiative Freiburg Lebenswert supported his campaign. During his campaign, the media questioned Horn's relationship to the evangelical neo-charismatic ICF and their engagement with his campaign team. Horn clarified in an interview that he was neither part of ICF nor any other independent church, but a member of the Protestant church.

With 34.7%, Horn received more votes on the first ballot than incumbent Dieter Salomon (Bündnis 90/Die Grünen).

Four candidates campaigned on the second ballot on May 6, 2018. Horn received a simple plurality of 44.2%, which was sufficient for a win. He stated that he wanted to focus on housing, as well as accountability and transparency towards citizens in his first 100 days in office. At the election after-party, Horn was attacked by a 54-year-old man who injured his face, broke his nose and damaged one of his teeth. The perpetrator was immediately arrested.

Horn could not assume the office of mayor as scheduled on 1 July 2018, due to a lawsuit contesting the election. While the claim was processed, the city council appointed him Amtsverweser, an interim representative and preliminary chief of the administration without representation in the city council. On March 5, 2019, the case was definitively rejected by the Mannheim administrative court.

In April 2019, Horn participated in the quiz show Ich weiß alles!, hosted by Jörg Pilawa in Das Erste. Although eliminated in the third round, he promoted Freiburg's 900th anniversary celebration and convinced Pilawa to host a quiz show in and about Freiburg.

== Personal life ==
Horn is married and has two sons. Before moving to Freiburg in 2018, he lived in Stuttgart with his family.

| Preceded by Dieter Salomon | Oberbürgermeister von Freiburg im Breisgau seit 2018 | Succeeded by - |
