= Alimentarium =

Food museum in Vevey (Switzerland)

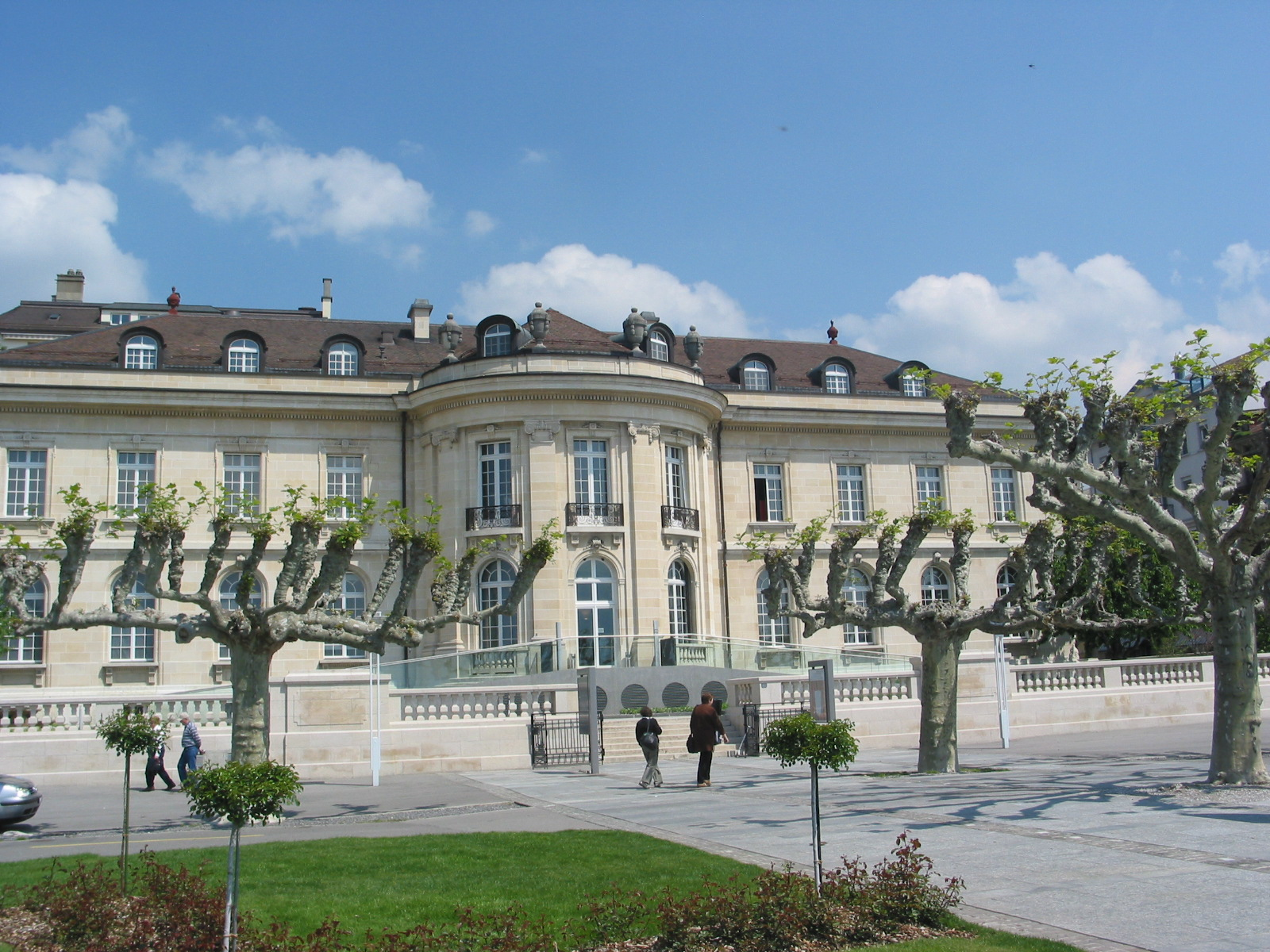
- Established: 21 June 1985
- Location: Vevey
- Coordinates: 46°27′30″N 6°50′47″E
- Type: Food museum
- Visitors: 38,936 (2024)
- Founder: Martin Schärer
- Director: Boris Wastiau
- Owner: Fondation Alimentarium
- Website: https://alimentarium.org

The Alimentarium, also known as the Food Museum, is a museum dedicated to food located in the Vaudoise town of Vevey, Switzerland. The museum is owned and operated by the Nestlé-funded Alimentarium Foundation, and is located in front of (and maintains) the Fork of Vevey.

== History ==
In 1921, the Nestlé company established its first administrative center in a neoclassical-style building located on the shores of Lake Geneva. The company's management remained there until 1936, when it moved to a new headquarters, and moved again in 1958 to its current location.

The creation of a museum dedicated to human nutrition was announced in 1980, with its grand opening initially planned for 1982 or 1983: the original building was then completely renovated and finally opened its doors on June 21, 1985.

To mark its tenth anniversary, the Fork of Vevey, an 8-meter tall stainless steel fork was set on the shores of the lake, in front of the museum, as part of a temporary exhibition. Removed at the end of the exhibition in March 1996, it was reinstated more than ten years later following a public petition.

As part of Nestlé's 150th anniversary, the museum was completely renovated in 2016, including the creation of an annex and a botanical garden dedicated to edible plants.

The museum is listed as a Swiss cultural property of national significance. It was established as a Nestlé-sponsored foundation and is governed by a foundation board composed of representatives from the company, the Federal Department of the Interior, and the Canton of Vaud, among others.

== Collections ==
The museum's permanent exhibition is designed around the theme of "cooking, buying, eating and digesting" and also presents the history of the Nestlé company. It also offers many temporary exhibitions related to food, such as cooking workshops. The museum's restaurant also frequently offers meals related to current exhibitions.

== See also ==
- List of museums in Switzerland
