= Vevey =

Town in Vaud, Switzerland

- Municipality
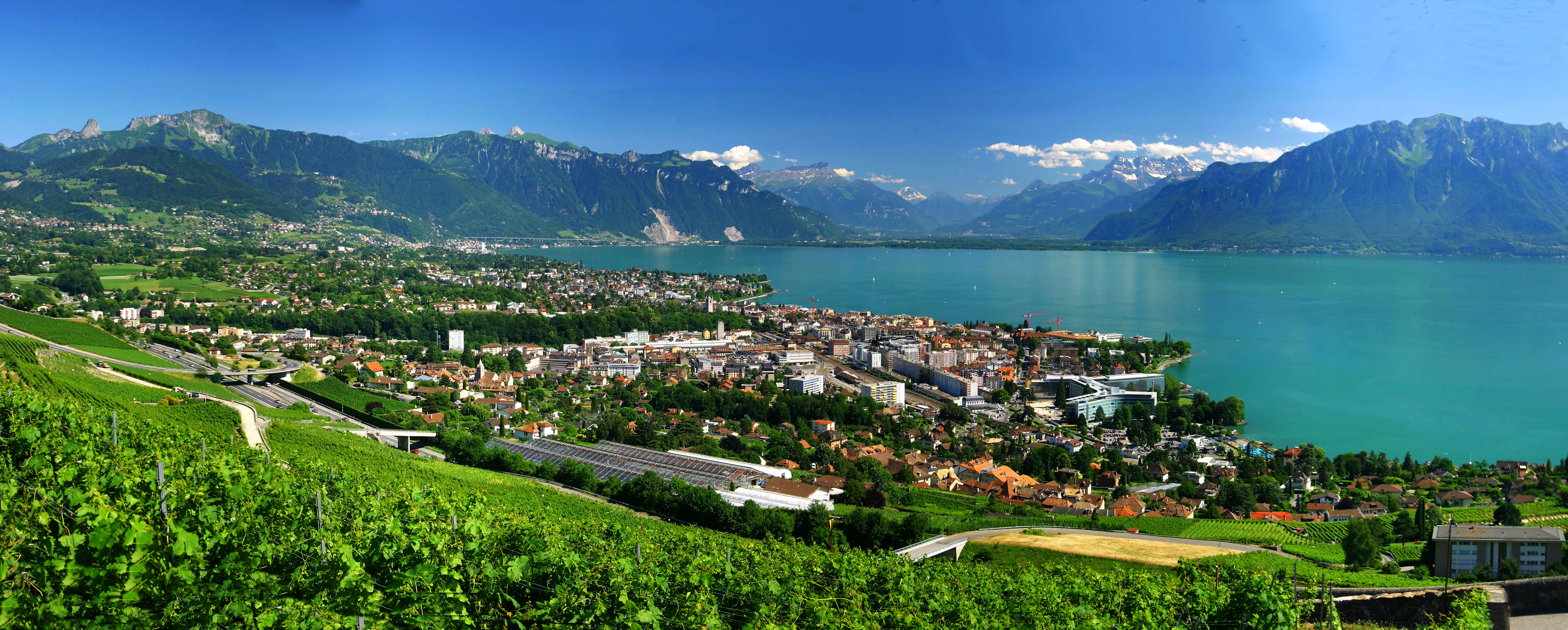
- Vevey and Lake Geneva

- Flag Coat of arms
- Location of Vevey
- Location within Switzerland Location within Canton of Vaud
- Coordinates: 46°28′N 6°51′E
- Country: Switzerland
- Canton: Vaud
- District: Riviera-Pays-d'Enhaut

Government
  - Executive: Municipalité with 5 members
  - Mayor: syndic (list); Elina Leimgruber Green Party (as of 2020)
  - Parliament: Conseil communal with 100 members

Area
  - Total: 2.39 km^{2} (0.92 sq mi)
- Elevation: 383 m (1,257 ft)

Population (December 2024)
  - Total: 20,142
  - Density: 8,430/km^{2} (21,800/sq mi)
- Time zone: UTC+01:00 (CET)
  - Summer (DST): UTC+02:00 (CEST)
- Postal code: 1800
- SFOS number: 5890
- ISO 3166 code: CH-VD
- Surrounded by: Corseaux, Corsier-sur-Vevey, La Tour-de-Peilz, Saint-Légier-La Chiésaz
- Website: vevey.ch

Vevey (/vəˈveɪ/; French pronunciation: [vəvɛ]; Arpitan: Vevê; former German: Vivis) is a municipality and a town in Switzerland in the canton of Vaud, on the north shore of Lake Geneva, near Lausanne. The German name Vivis is no longer commonly used.

It was the seat of the district of the same name until 2006, and is now part of the Riviera-Pays-d'Enhaut District. It is part of the French-speaking area of Switzerland.

Vevey is home to the world headquarters of the international food and beverage company Nestlé, founded here in 1867. Milk chocolate was invented in Vevey by Daniel Peter in 1875, with the aid of Henri Nestlé. The English actor and comedian Charlie Chaplin resided in Vevey from 1952 until his death in 1977.

== History ==
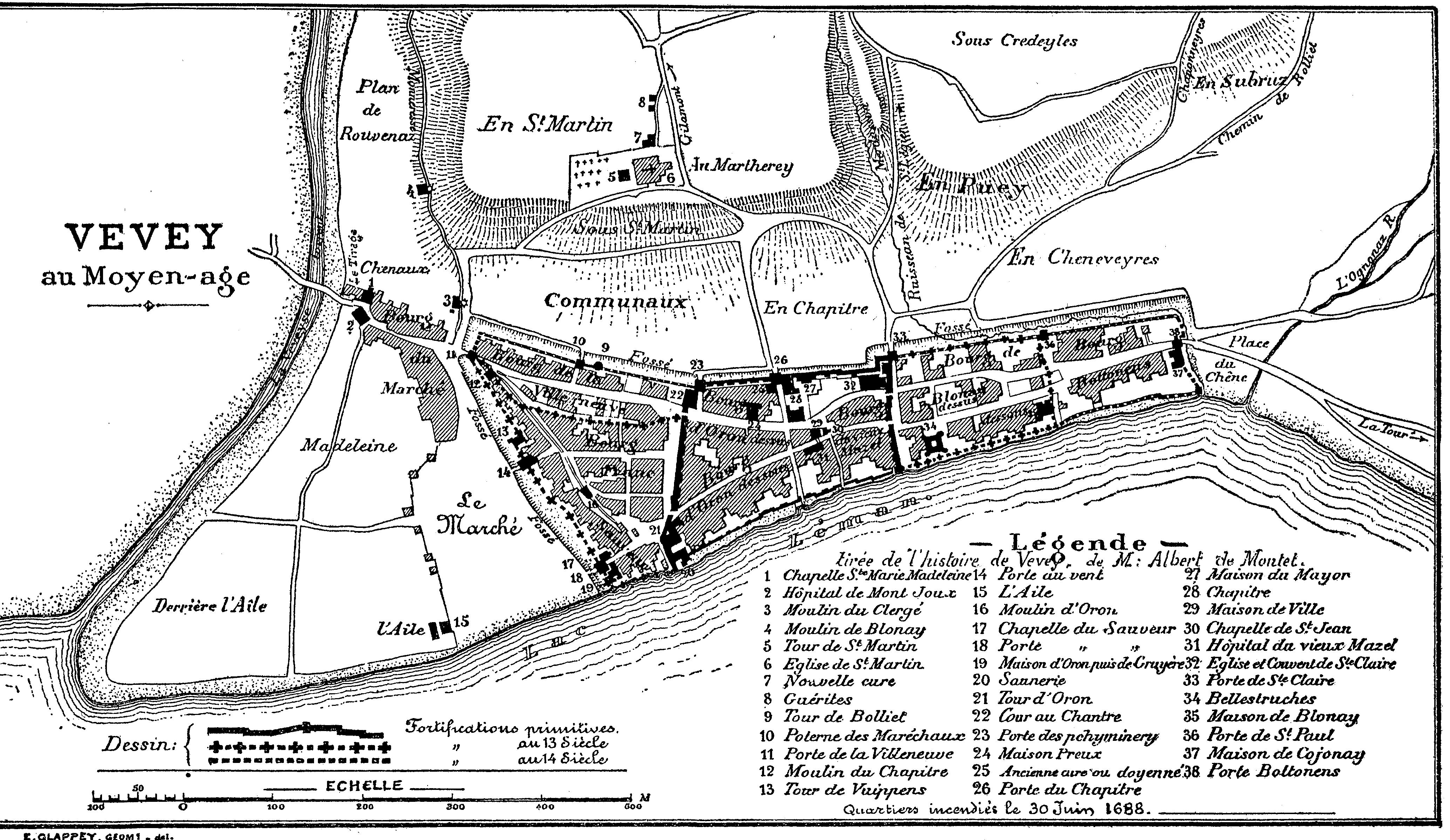
Vevey during the Middle Ages

A piloti settlement existed here as early as the 2nd millennium BC.

Under Rome, it was known as Viviscus or Vibiscum. It was mentioned for the first time by the ancient Greek astronomer and philosopher Ptolemy, who gave it the name Ouikos. In the Middle Ages it was a station on the Via Francigena. It was then ruled by the bishopric of Lausanne, and later under the Blonay family. In the 1660s, several of the English regicides fled to Switzerland, and many of them settled in Vevey under the protection of the Bernese government.

Vevey lived through a period of prosperity after the Vaud Revolution of 1798. In the 19th century industrial activities included mechanical engineering at the Ateliers de Constructions Mécaniques de Vevey, food (Nestlé) and tobacco (Rinsoz & Ormond).

Vevey is a major center of the Swiss chocolate industry since the 18th century. The Cailler factory was founded in 1819. Milk chocolate was also developed there by Daniel Peter in 1875.

== Geography ==
Aerial view (1965)

Vevey has an area, as of 2009, of 2.4 square kilometers (0.93 mi^{2}). Of this area, 0.07 km^{2} (0.027 mi^{2}) or 2.9% is used for agricultural purposes, while 0.11 km^{2} (0.042 mi^{2}) or 4.6% is forested. Of the rest of the land, 2.13 km^{2} (0.82 mi^{2}) or 89.5% is settled (buildings or roads), 0.04 km^{2} (9.9 acres) or 1.7% is either rivers or lakes.

Of the built up area, industrial buildings made up 2.9% of the total area while housing and buildings made up 51.3% and transportation infrastructure made up 26.9%. Power and water infrastructure as well as other special developed areas made up 1.7% of the area while parks, green belts and sports fields made up 6.7%. Out of the forested land, all of the forested land area is covered with heavy forests. Of the agricultural land, 0.4% is used for growing crops and 1.7% is pastures. All the water in the municipality is flowing water.

The municipality was the capital of the Vevey District until it was dissolved on 31 August 2006, and Vevey became the capital of the new district of Riviera-Pays-d'Enhaut.

== Coat of arms ==
The blazon of the municipal coat of arms is Per pale Or and Azure, two Letters V interlaced counterchanged.

== Demographics ==
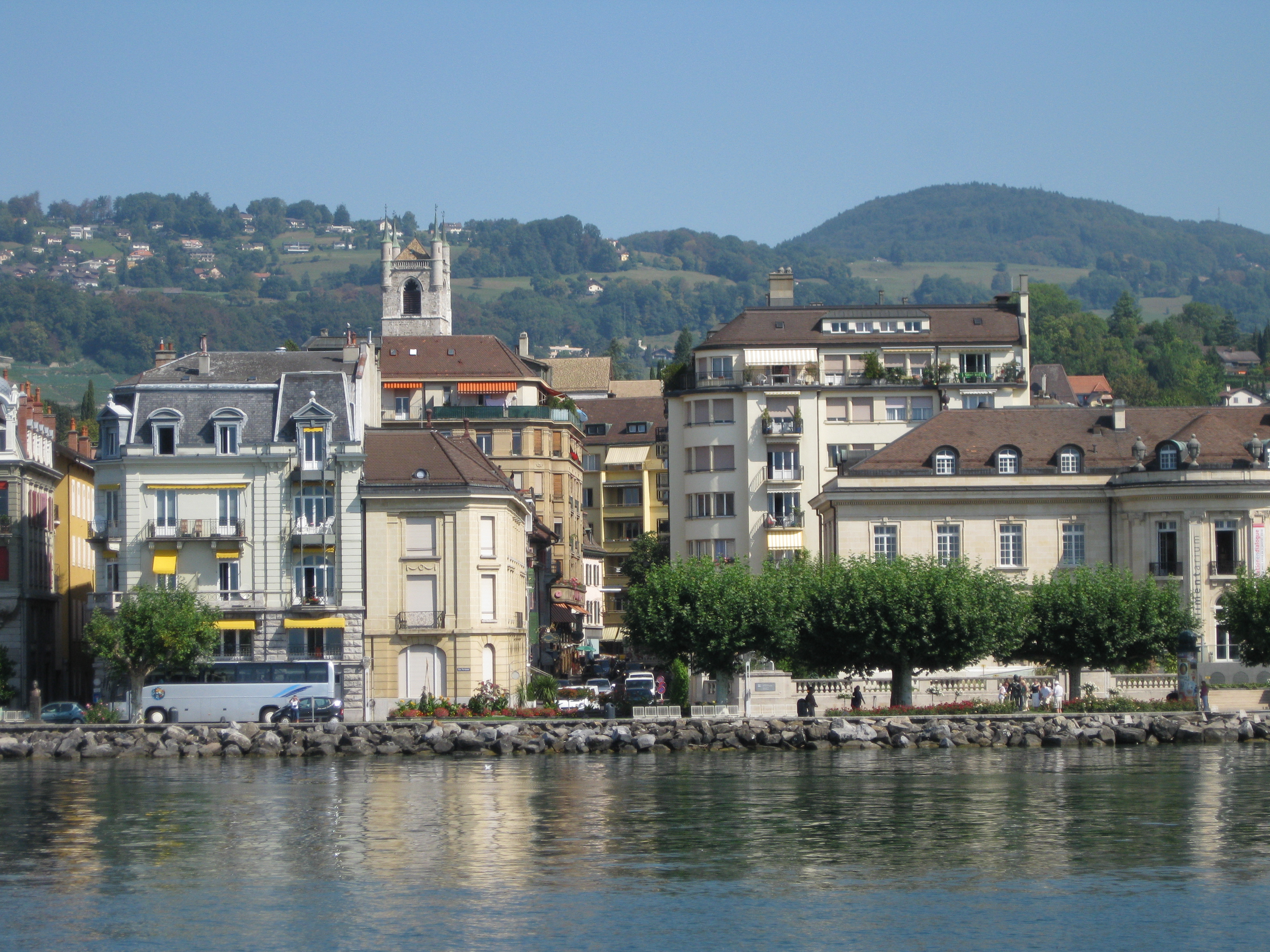
Vevey lakefront

Vevey has a population (as of December 2020) of 19,752. As of 2008, 43.2% of the population are resident foreign nationals. Over the last 10 years (1999–2009) the population has changed at a rate of 16.2%. It has changed at a rate of 14.2% due to migration and at a rate of 3.4% due to births and deaths.

Most of the population (as of 2000) speaks French (12,526 or 77.3%) as their first language, with Italian being second most common (854 or 5.3%) and Portuguese being third (601 or 3.7%). There are 599 people who speak German and 7 people who speak Romansh.

The age distribution, as of 2009, in Vevey is; 1,945 children or 10.8% of the population are between 0 and 9 years old and 1,928 teenagers or 10.7% are between 10 and 19. Of the adult population, 2,543 people or 14.1% of the population are between 20 and 29 years old. 3,059 people or 17.0% are between 30 and 39, 2,852 people or 15.9% are between 40 and 49, and 2,059 people or 11.5% are between 50 and 59. The senior population distribution is 1,516 people or 8.4% of the population are between 60 and 69 years old, 1,131 people or 6.3% are between 70 and 79, there are 806 people or 4.5% who are between 80 and 89, and there are 138 people or 0.8% who are 90 and older.

As of 2000, there were 6,936 people who were single and never married in the municipality. There were 6,966 married individuals, 1,065 widows or widowers and 1,235 individuals who are divorced.

As of 2000, there were 7,830 private households in the municipality, and an average of 2. persons per household. There were 3,667 households that consist of only one person and 334 households with five or more people. Out of a total of 8,012 households that answered this question, 45.8% were households made up of just one person and there were 39 adults who lived with their parents. Of the rest of the households, there are 1,694 married couples without children, 1,754 married couples with children. There were 527 single parents with a child or children. There were 149 households that were made up of unrelated people and 182 households that were made up of some sort of institution or another collective housing.

In 2000 there were 264 single family homes (or 20.5% of the total) out of a total of 1,286 inhabited buildings. There were 565 multi-family buildings (43.9%), along with 329 multi-purpose buildings that were mostly used for housing (25.6%) and 128 other use buildings (commercial or industrial) that also had some housing (10.0%).

In 2000, a total of 7,752 apartments (83.4% of the total) were permanently occupied, while 1,117 apartments (12.0%) were seasonally occupied and 430 apartments (4.6%) were empty. As of 2009, the construction rate of new housing units was 6.8 new units per 1000 residents.

As of 2003 the average price to rent an average apartment in Vevey was 1067.93 Swiss francs (CHF) per month (US$850, £480, €680 approx. exchange rate from 2003). The average rate for a one-room apartment was 567.76 CHF (US$450, £260, €360), a two-room apartment was about 787.77 CHF (US$630, £350, €500), a three-room apartment was about 1014.16 CHF (US$810, £460, €650) and a six or more room apartment cost an average of 1817.64 CHF (US$1450, £820, €1160). The average apartment price in Vevey was 95.7% of the national average of 1116 CHF. The vacancy rate for the municipality, in 2010, was 0.45%.

The historical population is given in the following chart:

== Heritage sites of national significance ==
There are 14 structures in Vevey that are listed as Swiss heritage site of national significance. The four museums on the list are: the Alimentarium; the Museum de la Confrérie des Vignerons (fr); the Museum Jenisch; the Museum suisse de l'appareil photographique (fr). There are three churches: the Roman Catholic Church of Notre-Dame; the Orthodox Church of the Great Martyr Barbara; the Swiss Reformed Church of Saint-Martin. The other seven buildings are: the Administration Building and Historical Archives of Nestlé SA; Aile Castle; the Cour au Chantre; the City Hall; the Hôtel des Trois-Couronnes; the La Grenette and Place du Marché; the Saint-Jean Tower and Fountain.

=== Heritage gallery ===
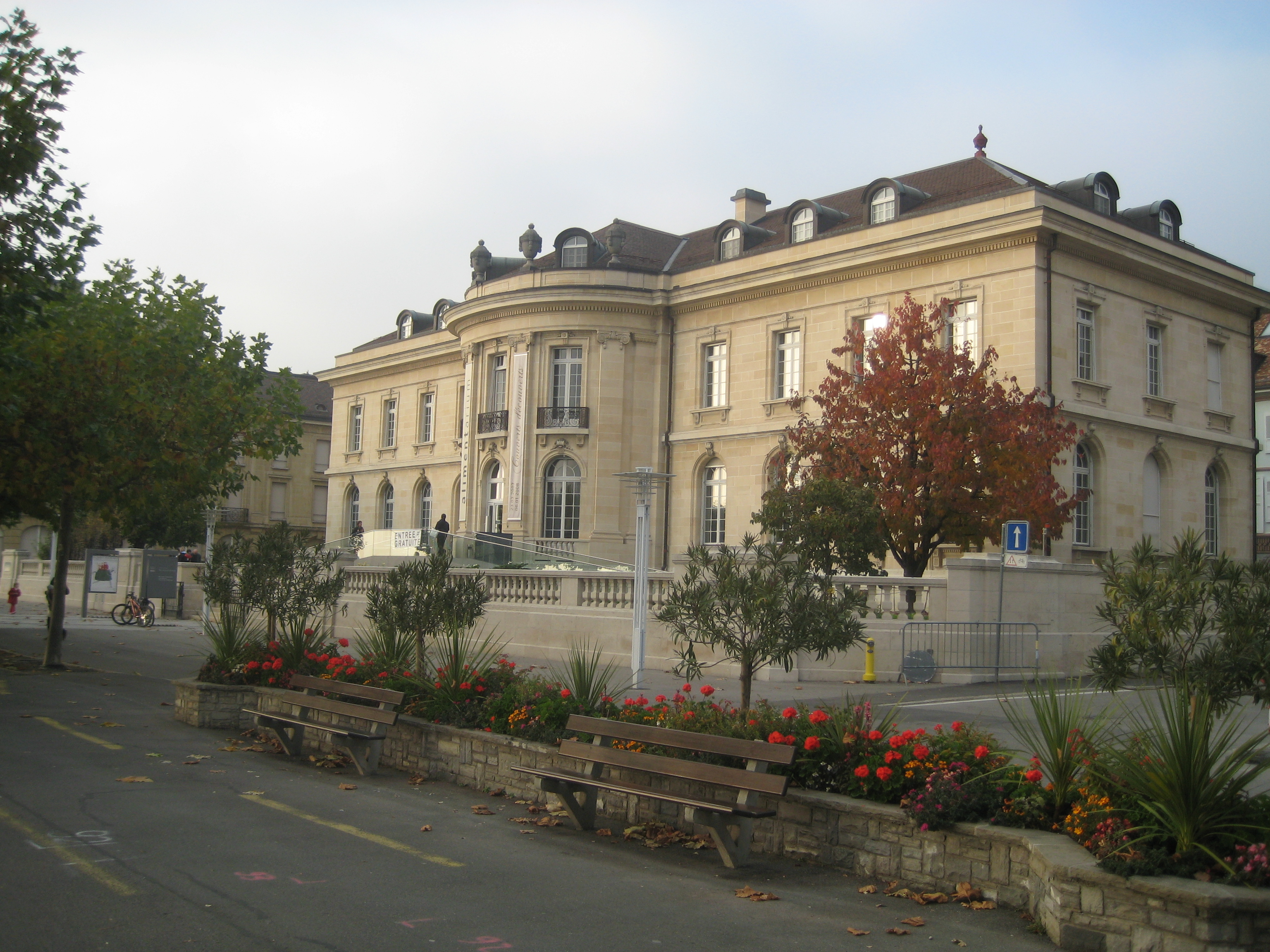
Alimentarium

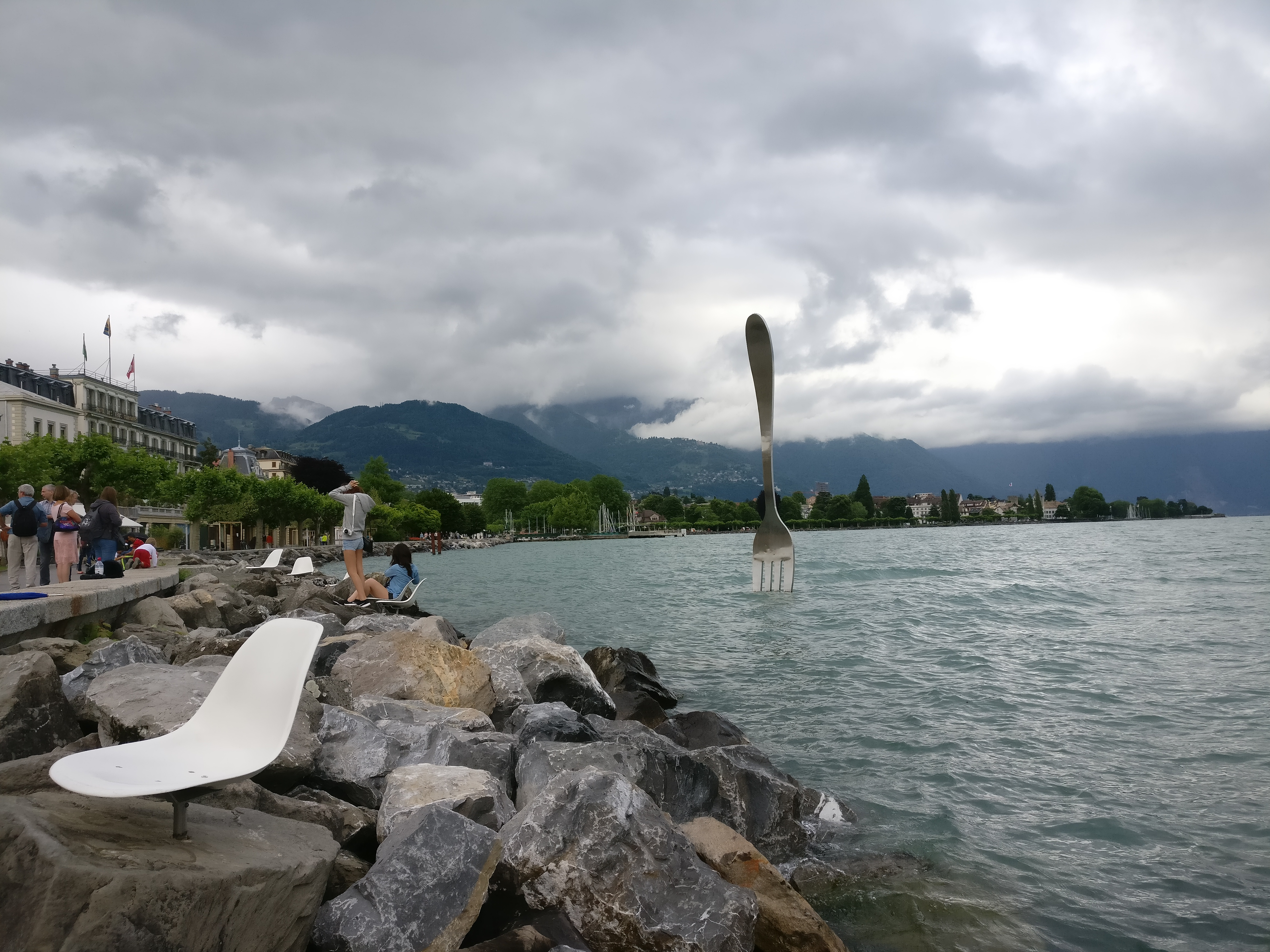
Fork of Vevey, a monument on Geneva Lake by Alimentarium

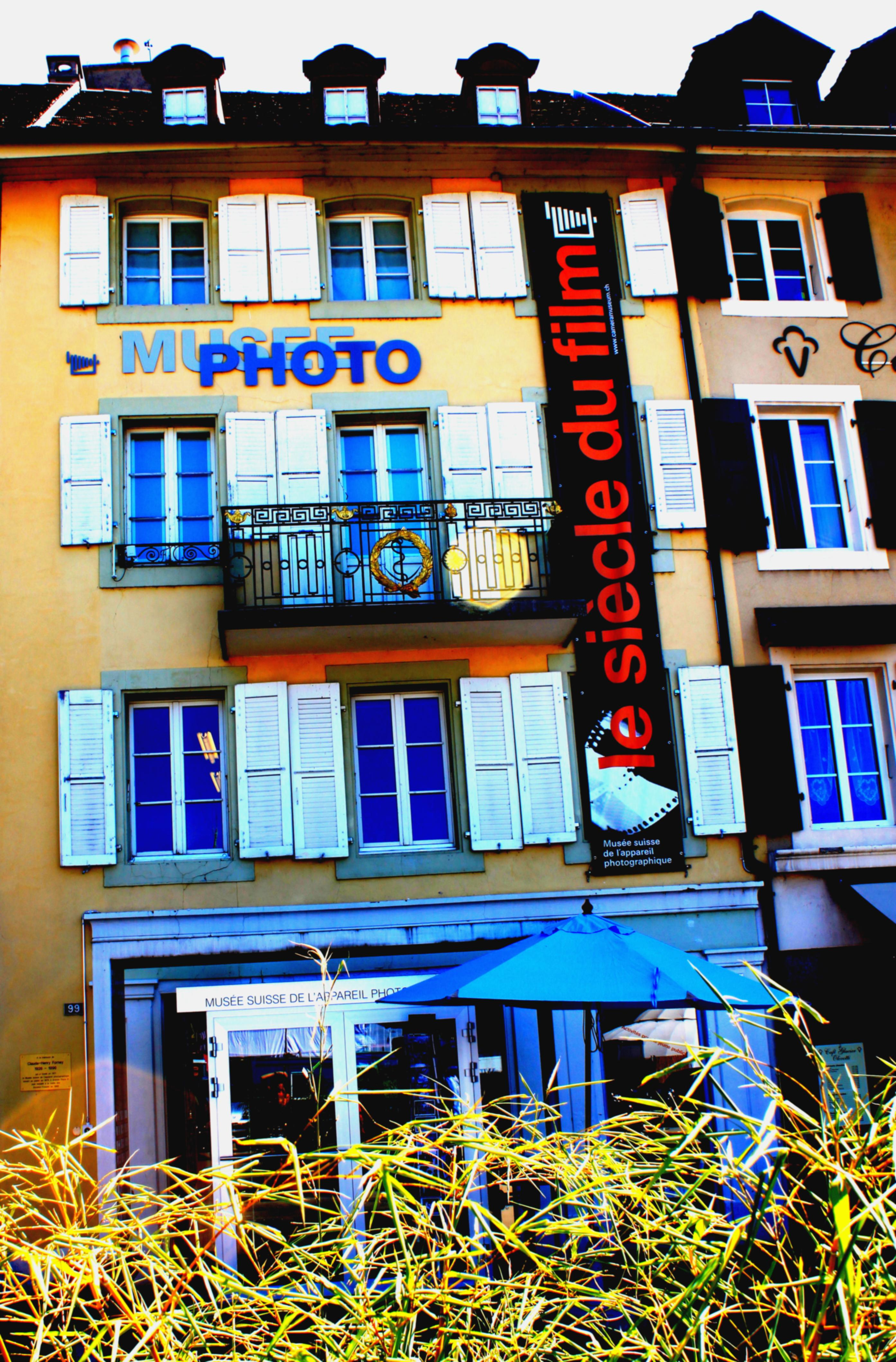
Museum suisse de l'appareil photographique (Photography museum)

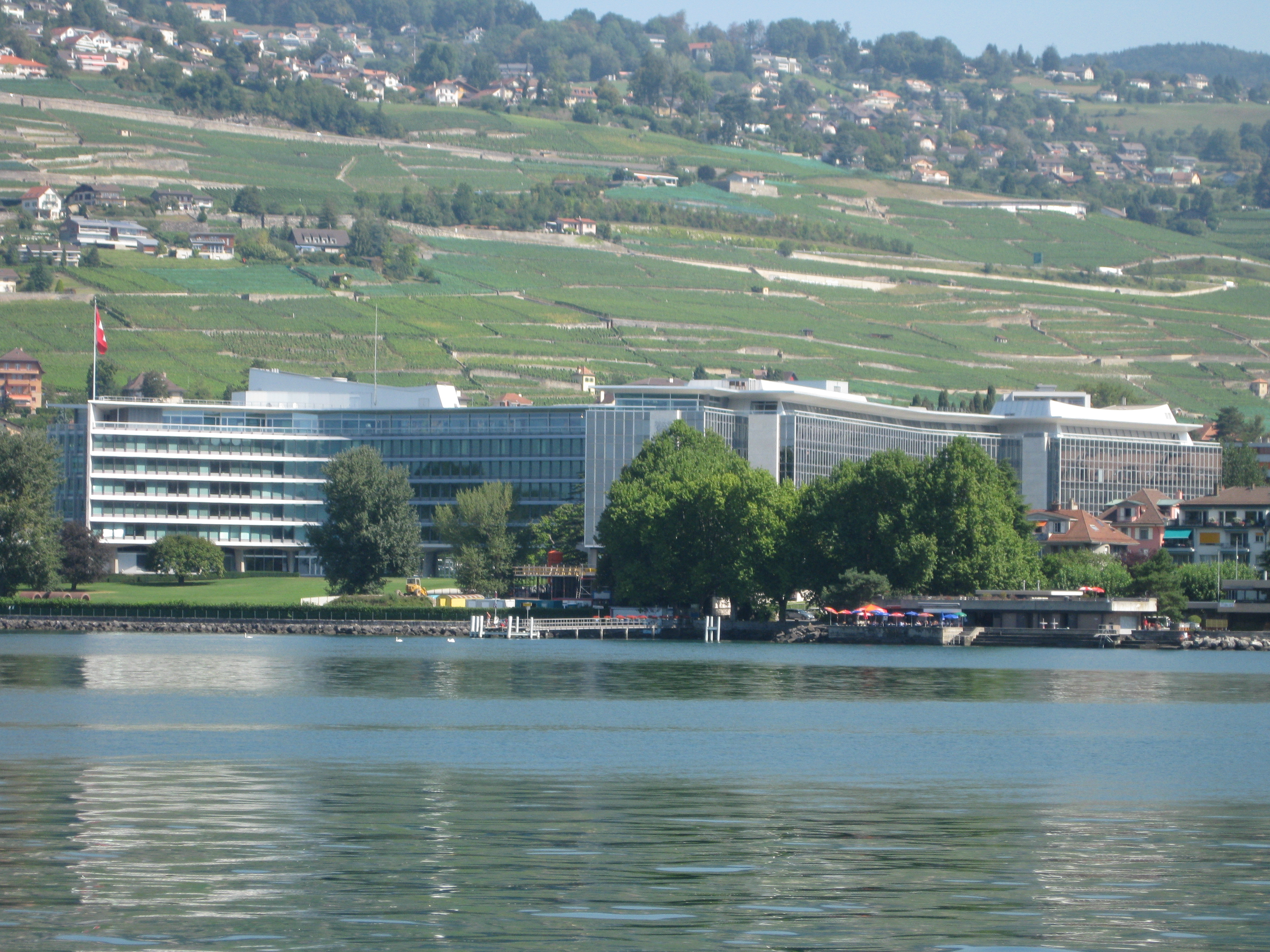
Administration Building Nestlé

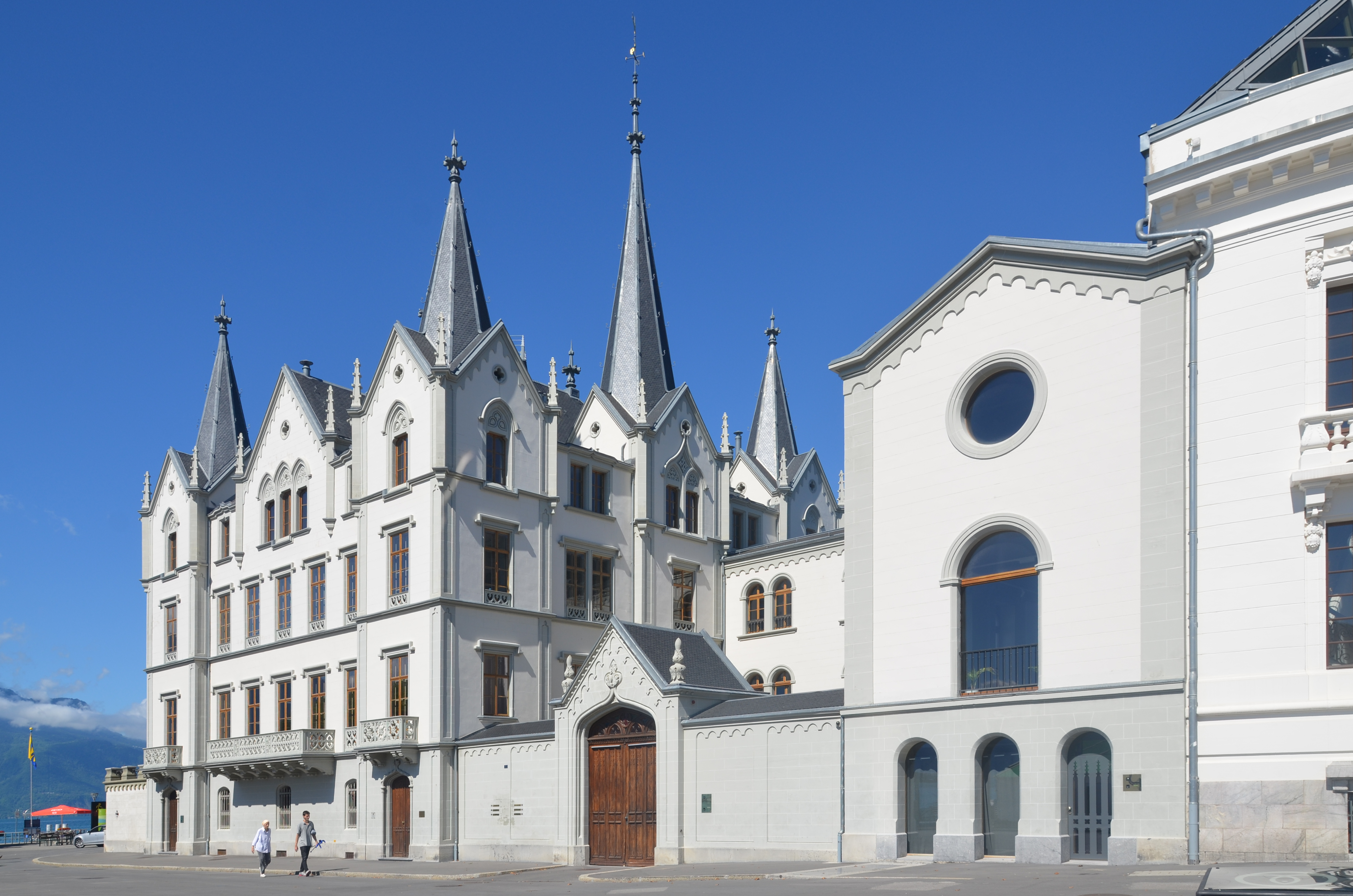
Aile Castle

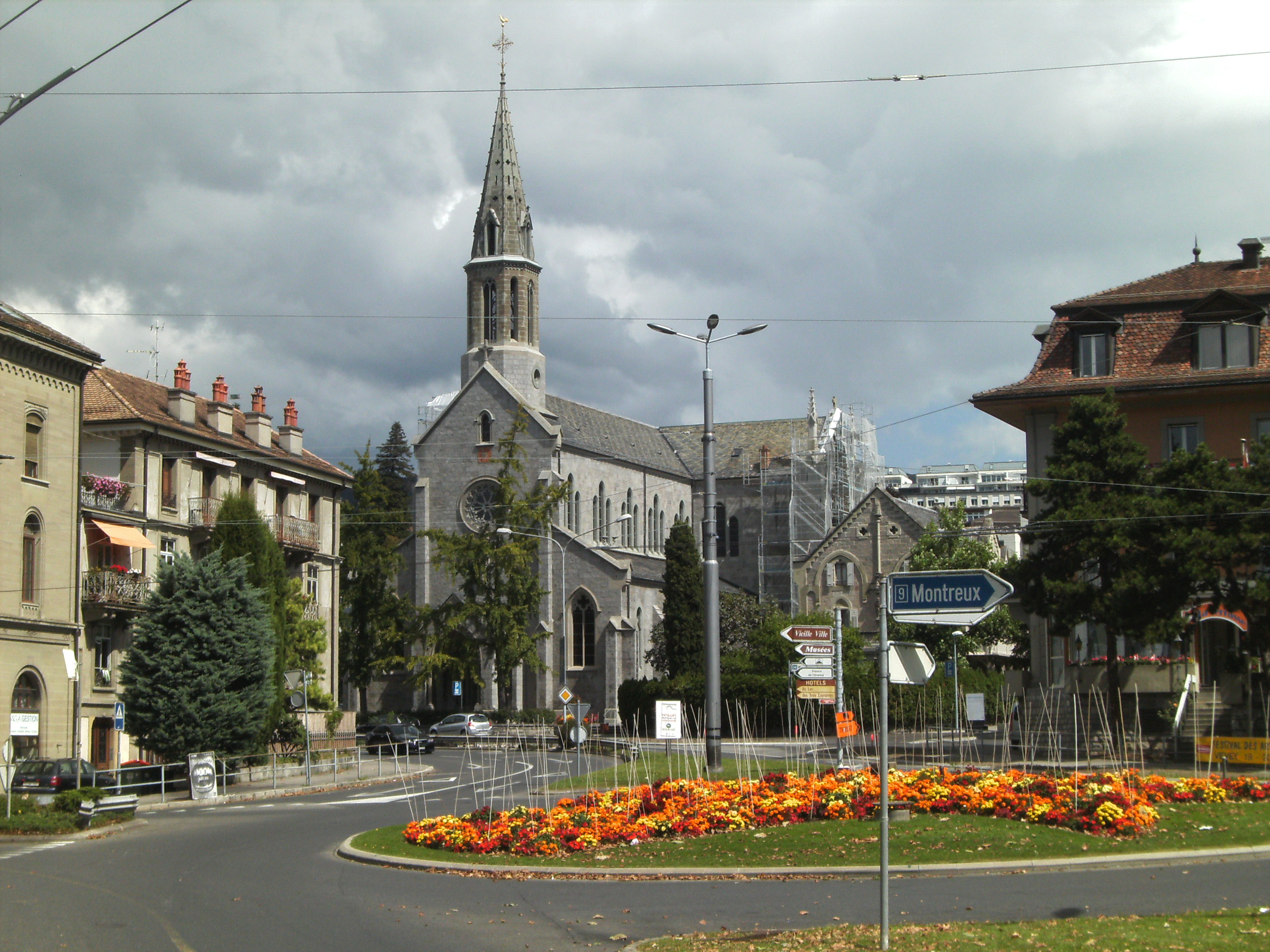
Catholic Church

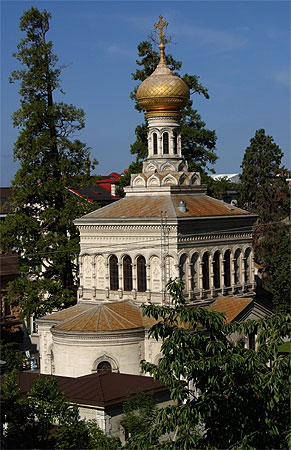
Eastern Orthodox Church

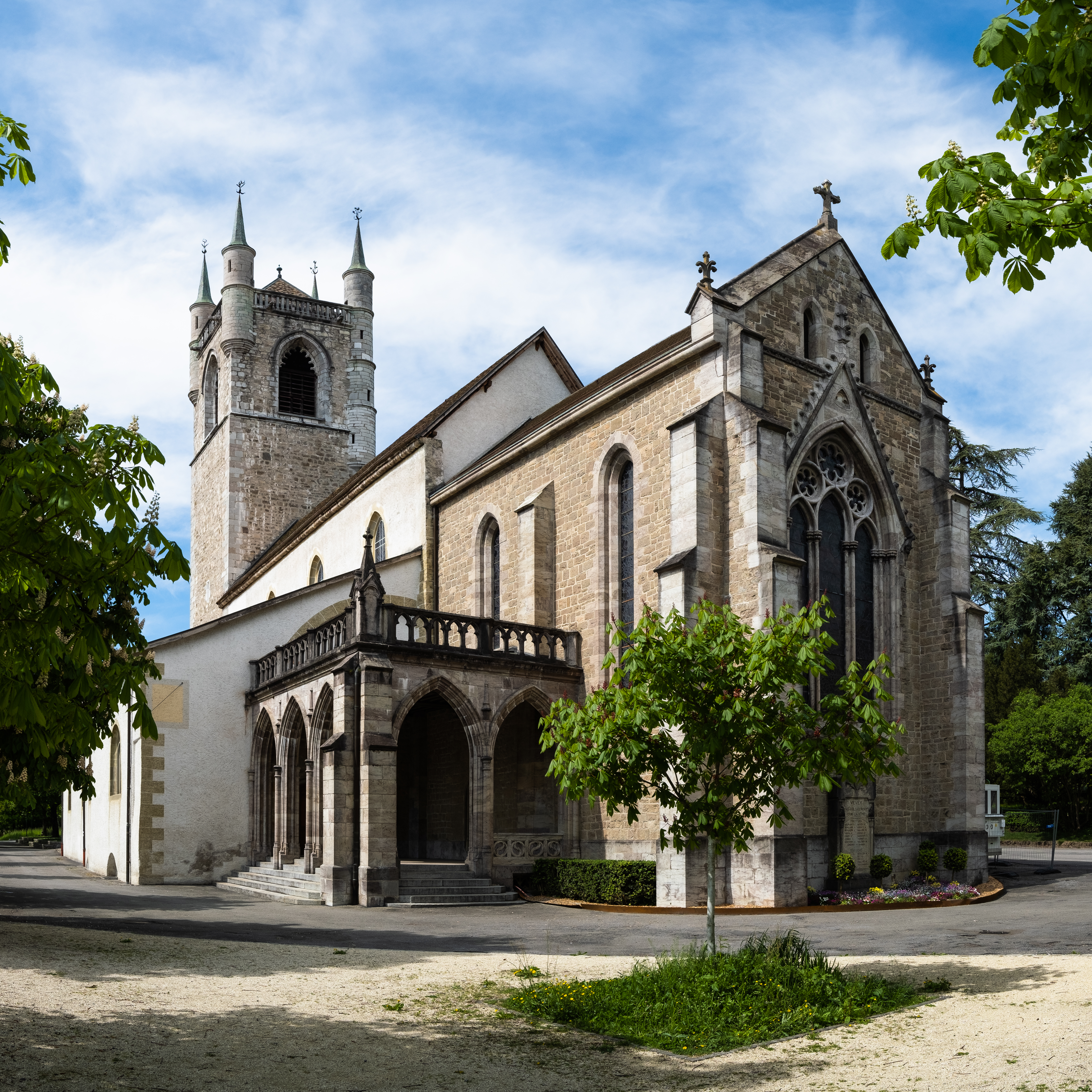
Swiss Reformed Church of Saint-Martin

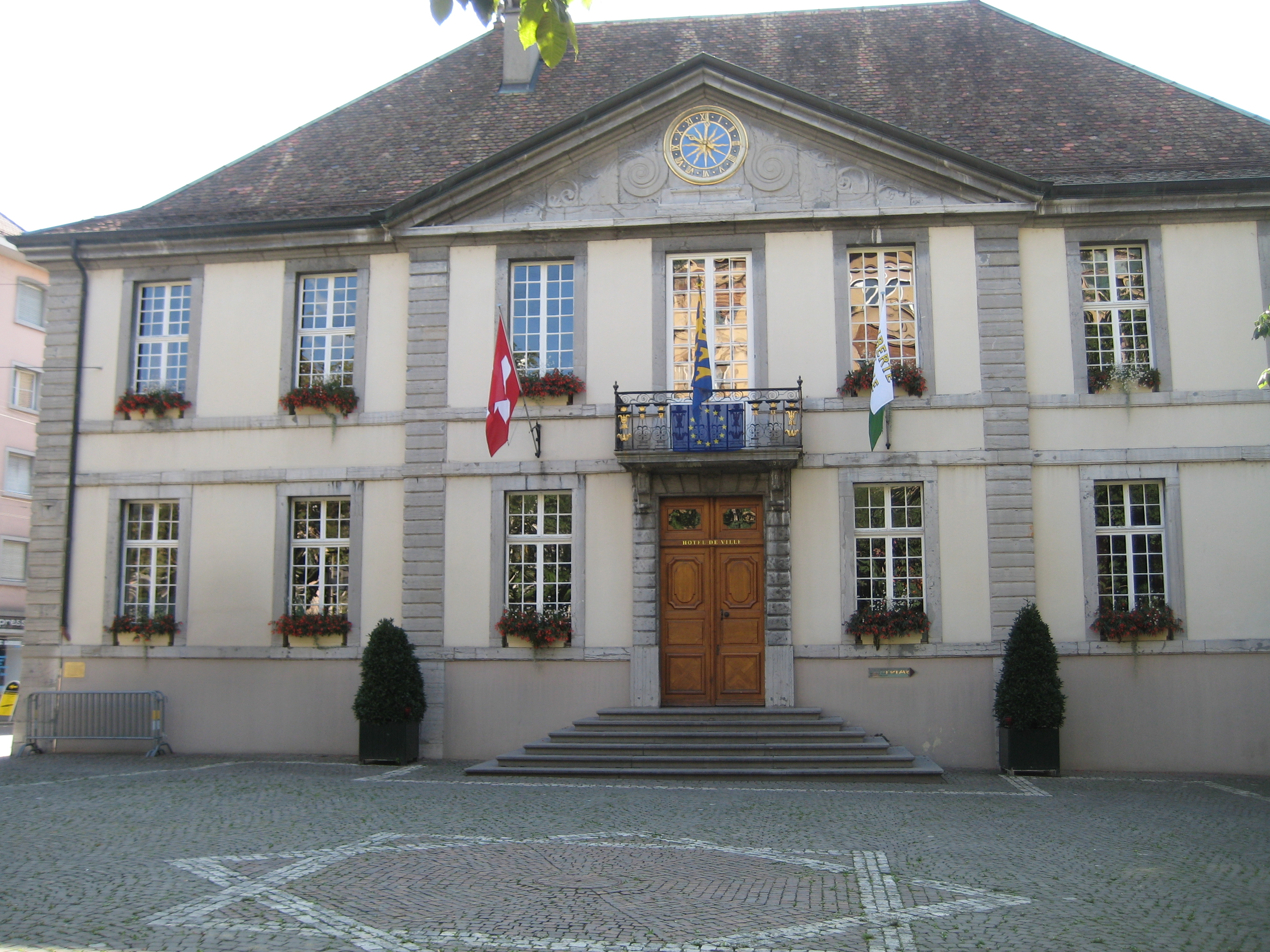
City Hall

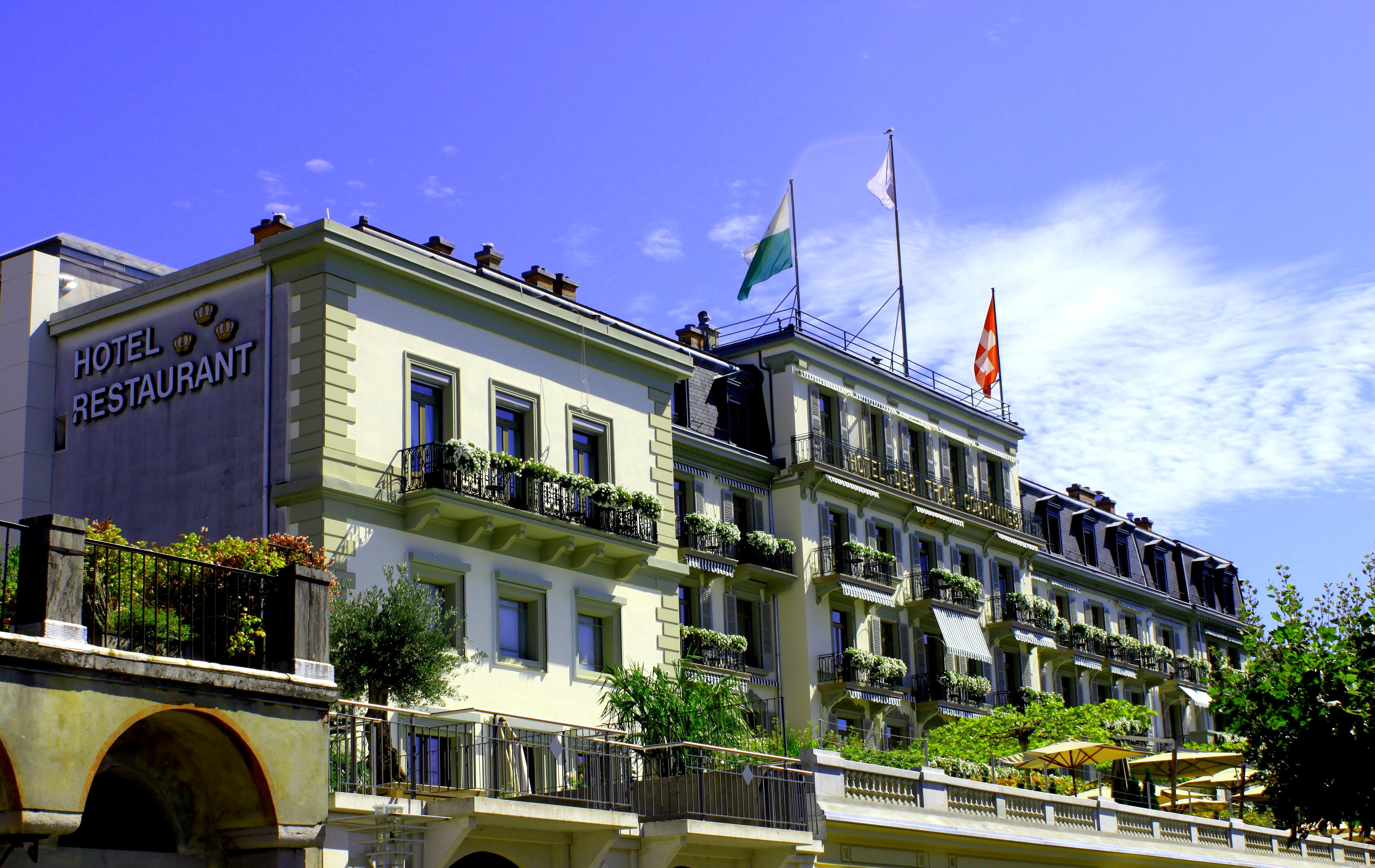
Hôtel des Trois-Couronnes

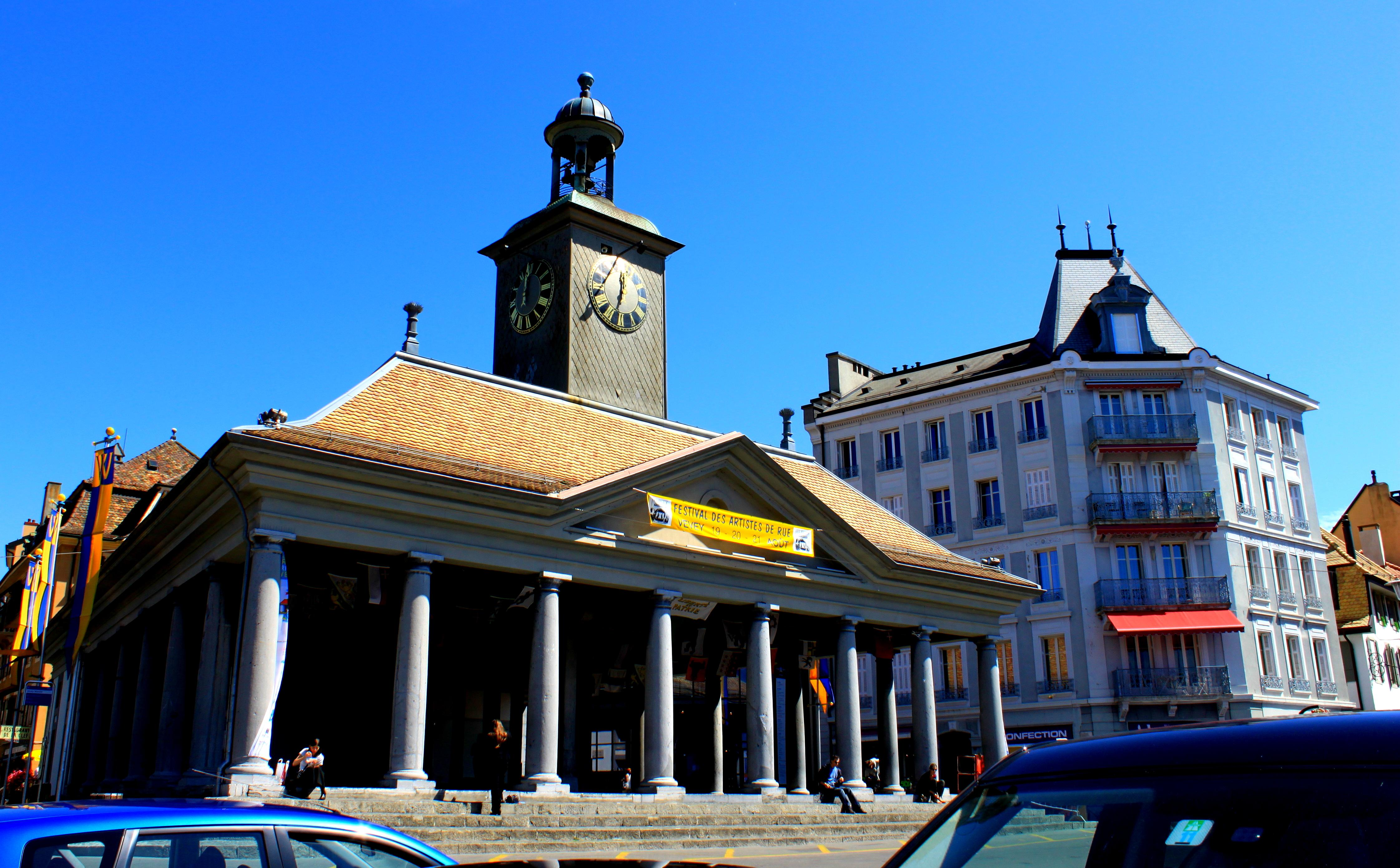
La Grenette and Place du Marché

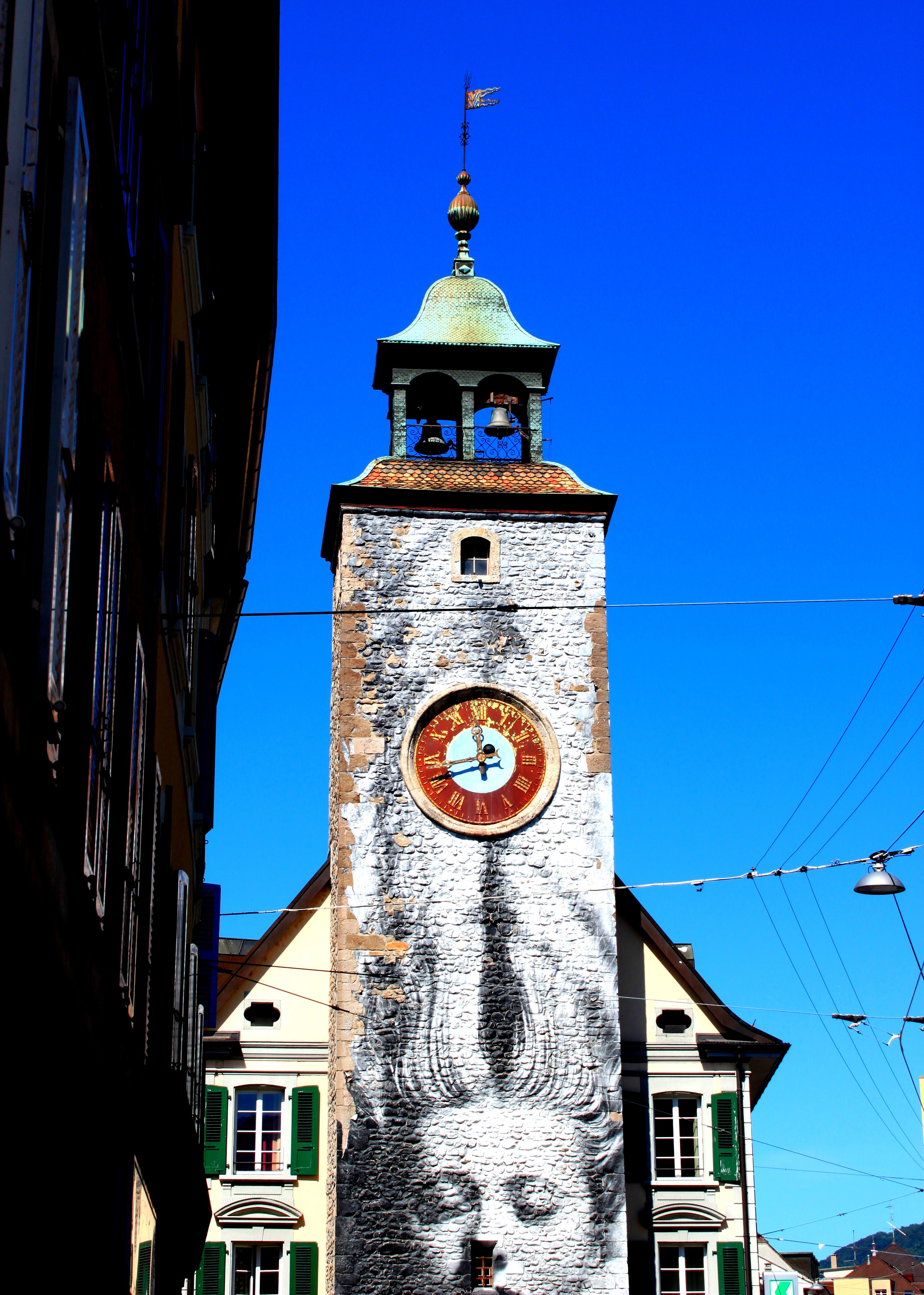
Saint-Jean Tower and Fountain

== Main sights ==
The Grande Place is dominated by a granary known as La Grenette, built in 1803 in the Neo-Classical "rustic" style. Behind La Grenette is the restaurant La Clef, in which Jean-Jacques Rousseau used to eat. The table at which he sat is still to be seen in the restaurant.

St Martin's Church, a few minutes' walk away from the Grande Place, contains the bodies of a number of those who condemned King Charles I of England to death – especially that of Edmund Ludlow who escaped to Vevey after the death of Oliver Cromwell.

Additionally, there is a large fork, the Fork of Vevey, just off the shore of the lake. The fork was originally installed in 1995 as a temporary exhibit. Removed in 1996 and replaced in 2007, it finally got authorization to remain in the lake in 2008 and has become an emblem for the townspeople.

=== Festivals ===
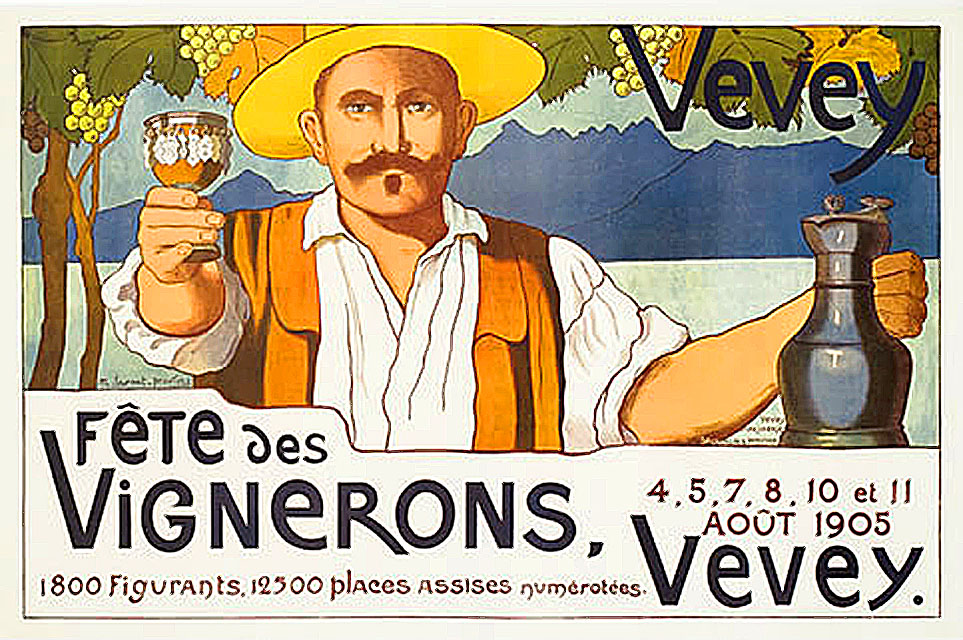
Poster for the Fête des Vignerons from 1905

The Confrérie des Vignerons (Brotherhood of Winegrowers) organises the Winegrowers' Festival (Fête des Vignerons) four or five times each century (one per generation) to celebrate its wine-growing traditions and culture. On those occasions an arena for 16,000 spectators is built in the marketplace – the Grande Place, which is the second-biggest marketplace in Europe, after Lisbon, Portugal. The festivals date from the 18th century; the last five were in 1927, 1955, 1977, 1999, and 2019.

=== Market ===
The town is also known for its large market on Tuesday and Saturday mornings. The Vevey folk markets, known locally as the Marchés Folkloriques, normally has up to 2000 visitors each Saturday over a period of two months. (Second week of July to end August). Visitors can buy a wine-glass and drink to their heart's content while listening to brass bands, Swiss folk music, and watching traditional craftsmen at work. These Folk Markets are organised by the Société de développement de Vevey.

== Politics ==
In the 2007 federal election, the most popular party was the SP, which received 27.21% of the vote. The next three most popular parties were the SVP (17.86%), the Green Party (16.21%) and the FDP (10.83%). In the federal election, a total of 3,217 votes were cast, and the voter turnout was 40.0%.

Many of the Union Cycliste Internationale defamation lawsuits against its critics have occurred under the Est Vaudois district court of Vevey.

== Economy ==
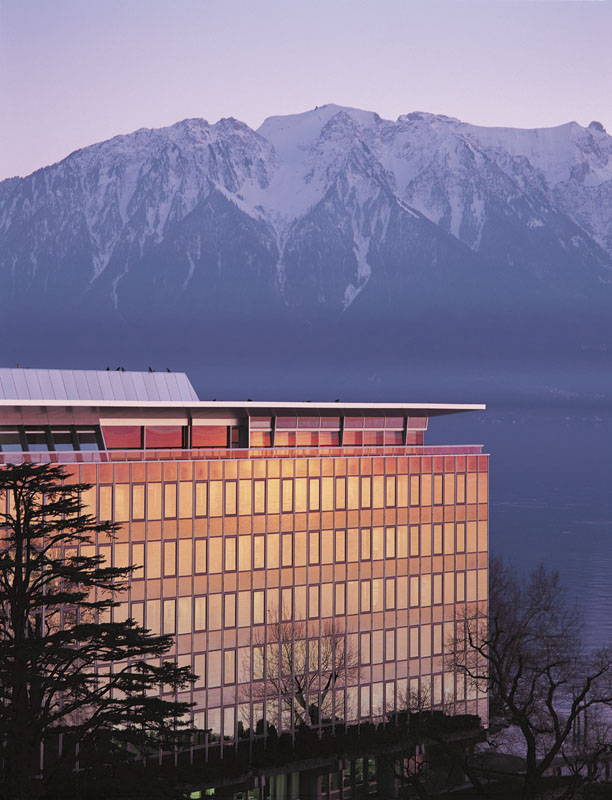
The headquarters of Nestlé.

As of 2010, Vevey had an unemployment rate of 8.1%. As of 2008, there were 9 people employed in the primary economic sector and about 6 businesses involved in this sector. 1,320 people were employed in the secondary sector and there were 134 businesses in this sector. 10,014 people were employed in the tertiary sector, with 985 businesses in this sector. There were 7,741 residents of the municipality who were employed in some capacity, of which females made up 46.4% of the workforce.

In 2008 the total number of full-time equivalent jobs was 9,458. The number of jobs in the primary sector was 6, all of which were in agriculture. The number of jobs in the secondary sector was 1,246 of which 433 or (34.8%) were in manufacturing and 688 (55.2%) were in construction. The number of jobs in the tertiary sector was 8,206. In the tertiary sector; 1,749 or 21.3% were in wholesale or retail sales or the repair of motor vehicles, 228 or 2.8% were in the movement and storage of goods, 614 or 7.5% were in a hotel or restaurant, 218 or 2.7% were in the information industry, 382 or 4.7% were the insurance or financial industry, 2,150 or 26.2% were technical professionals or scientists, 432 or 5.3% were in education and 1,437 or 17.5% were in health care.

In 2000, there were 8,153 workers who commuted into the municipality and 4,049 workers who commuted away. The municipality is a net importer of workers, with about 2.0 workers entering the municipality for every one leaving. About 1.2% of the workforce coming into Vevey are coming from outside Switzerland, while 0.0% of the locals commute out of Switzerland for work. Of the working population, 25.2% used public transportation to get to work, and 42.2% used a private car.

== Religion ==
From the 2000 census, 6,676 or 41.2% were Roman Catholic, while 4,224 or 26.1% belonged to the Swiss Reformed Church. Of the rest of the population, there were 427 members of an Orthodox church (or about 2.64% of the population), there were 8 individuals (or about 0.05% of the population) who belonged to the Christian Catholic Church, and there were 685 individuals (or about 4.23% of the population) who belonged to another Christian church. There were 43 individuals (or about 0.27% of the population) who were Jewish, and 1,083 (or about 6.68% of the population) who were Islamic. There were 52 individuals who were Buddhist, 47 individuals who were Hindu and 38 individuals who belonged to another church. 2,189 (or about 13.51% of the population) belonged to no church, are agnostic or atheist, and 1,050 individuals (or about 6.48% of the population) did not answer the question.

== Weather ==
Vevey has an average of 124.1 days of rain or snow per year and on average receives 1,234 mm (48.6 in) of precipitation. The wettest month is August during which time Vevey receives an average of 138 mm (5.4 in) of rain or snow. During this month there is precipitation for an average of 10.7 days. The month with the most days of precipitation is May, with an average of 12.7, but with only 112 mm (4.4 in) of rain or snow. The driest month of the year is February with an average of 78 mm (3.1 in) of precipitation over 9.4 days.

== Education ==
In Vevey about 5,104 or (31.5%) of the population have completed non-mandatory upper secondary education, and 2,069 or (12.8%) have completed additional higher education (either university or a Fachhochschule). Of the 2,069 who completed tertiary schooling, 43.5% were Swiss men, 29.2% were Swiss women, 15.4% were non-Swiss men and 11.9% were non-Swiss women.

In the 2009/2010 school year there were a total of 1,968 students in the Vevey school district. In the Vaud cantonal school system, two years of non-obligatory pre-school are provided by the political districts. During the school year, the political district provided pre-school care for a total of 817 children of which 456 children (55.8%) received subsidized pre-school care. The canton's primary school program requires students to attend for four years. There were 1,024 students in the municipal primary school program. The obligatory lower secondary school program lasts for six years and there were 852 students in those schools. There were also 92 students who were home schooled or attended another non-traditional school.

As of 2000, there were 712 students in Vevey who came from another municipality, while 537 residents attended schools outside the municipality.

Vevey is home to the Alimentarium, the Musée Jenisch, and the Musée suisse de l'appareil photo museums. In 2009 the Alimentarium was visited by 61,358 visitors (the average in previous years was 57,530). In the same year the Musée Jenisch was closed for renovations but the average in previous years was 17,286, and the Musée suisse de l'appareil photo was visited by 10,989 visitors (the average in previous years was 11,874).

Vevey is home to the Bibliothèque médiathèque municipale library. The library has (as of 2008) 64,994 books or other media, and loaned out 153,629 items in the same year. It was open a total of 273 days with average of 34 hours per week during that year.

== Sports ==
FC Vevey-Sports 05 is the town's football club. Club Aviron Vevey, also known as CAVy, is the town's rowing club. They currently hold the title for the best rowing club in Romandie.

== Infrastructure ==
=== Healthcare ===
Two hospitals are located in the municipality (Providence, in activity, and Samaritain, under renovation), as well at the Pharmacy of the Eastern Vaud Hospitals (until 2019).

=== Transportation ===
Vevey railway station, the first station to be "automated" in 1956, is served by several routes of the RER Vaud commuter rail system. It has frequent trains to Blonay, Lausanne, Geneva, Montreux and Villeneuve, among others.

The Vevey–Chardonne–Mont Pèlerin funicular links Vevey with the summit of Mont Pèlerin.

The Vevey–Villeneuve trolleybus line is the last remaining of the five interurban trolleybus lines that have existed in Switzerland. It largely follows Swiss main road no. 9, passes through the municipalities of Vevey, La Tour-de-Peilz, Montreux, Veytaux and Villeneuve, and serves a total of 41 stops. Also known as line 201, it operates every 10 minutes during the day between termini at the base station of the funicular and Villeneuve.

The number 213 bus line, operated by motor buses, goes up to Châtel-Saint-Denis and Bossonnens. There are also late night Petit Prince buses.

Vevey is well connected on the lake with boats going to all the major harbours like Le Bouveret, Saint Gingolph, Évian, Lausanne and more.

== Literary references ==
The action of Rousseau's Julie, or the New Heloise is set in and around Vevey.

Vevey, and in particular the hotel "Trois Couronnes" is one of two locations that comprise the setting of Henry James' novella Daisy Miller.

In Ernest Hemingway's short story "A Canary for One", three Americans—a woman and a couple—meet on a train. Vevey is named as the place where the daughter of the woman fell in love with a local man and was taken away by her family, while the couple had spent their honeymoon there.

It is also mentioned in Little Women, the classic American novel by Louisa May Alcott, as the location of the young Theodore "Laurie" Laurence's early studies at boarding school as well as a stop on Amy March's European trip. It is in Vevey where she hears of her sister's death and becomes engaged to Laurie. Vevey was also the place where, in real life, Alcott met Ladislas Wiesniewski, who served as one of the models for Laurie.

Vevey is also the lakeside town used as the setting for Anita Brookner's Booker Prize-winning novel Hotel du Lac.

H. G. Wells' The Shape of Things to Come, published in 1934, predicted a Second World War breaking out in 1940 and lasting until 1950. In this future scenario, Vevey is depicted as the venue of an international peace conference held in 1941, where various prominent diplomats and statesmen gather, deliver "brilliant pacifist speeches [which] echo throughout Europe", but fail to end the war.

A small village church above Vevey is mentioned by John Ruskin in The Stones of Venice, CHAPTER XI, The Arch Masonry, Page 169, diagram 5. Commenting on it, "It could hardly be stronger".

== Prix Clara Haskil ==
The Clara Haskil International Piano Competition is held biennially in her memory. The brochure reads: "The Clara Haskil Competition was founded in 1963 to honour and perpetuate the memory of the incomparable Swiss pianist, of Romanian origin, who was born in Bucharest in 1895. It takes place every two years in Vevey, Switzerland, where Clara Haskil resided from 1942 until her death in Brussels in 1960.

== In modern music ==
Rick Wakeman, keyboardist for the progressive-rock band Yes, recorded the final organ portion of the song "Awaken", and the organ part in the song "Parallels", (both on the Yes album Going for the One), on the pipe organ in St. Martin's Church in Vevey. A further instrumental track, Vevey (Revisited) appears in part on the 'YesYears' album, and in full on the 2003 remaster of Going for the One. Wakeman also used the St. Martin's organ on his solo album (recorded shortly after Going for the One) "Rick Wakeman's Criminal Record" most notably in the final track "Judas Iscariot".

Vevey, along with the Vineyards of Lavaux are mentioned in the song Lavaux on singer Prince's album 20Ten.

== Photo gallery ==
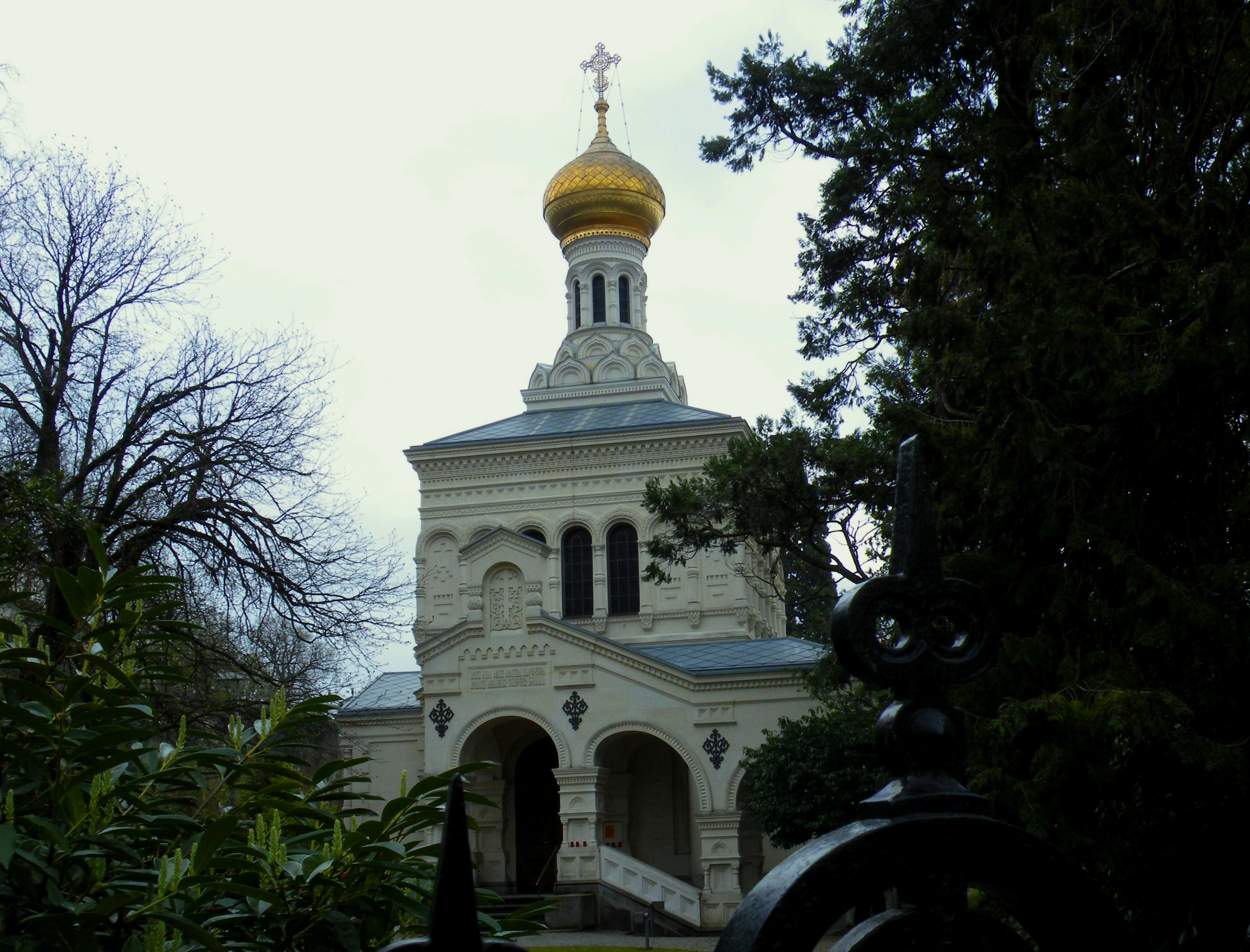
Saint Barbara Orthodox church

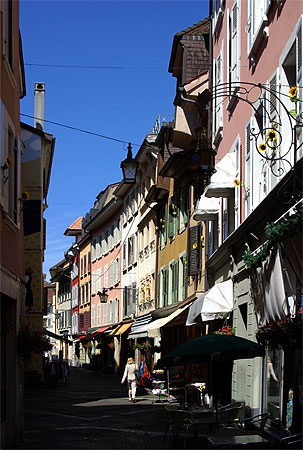
Old Town

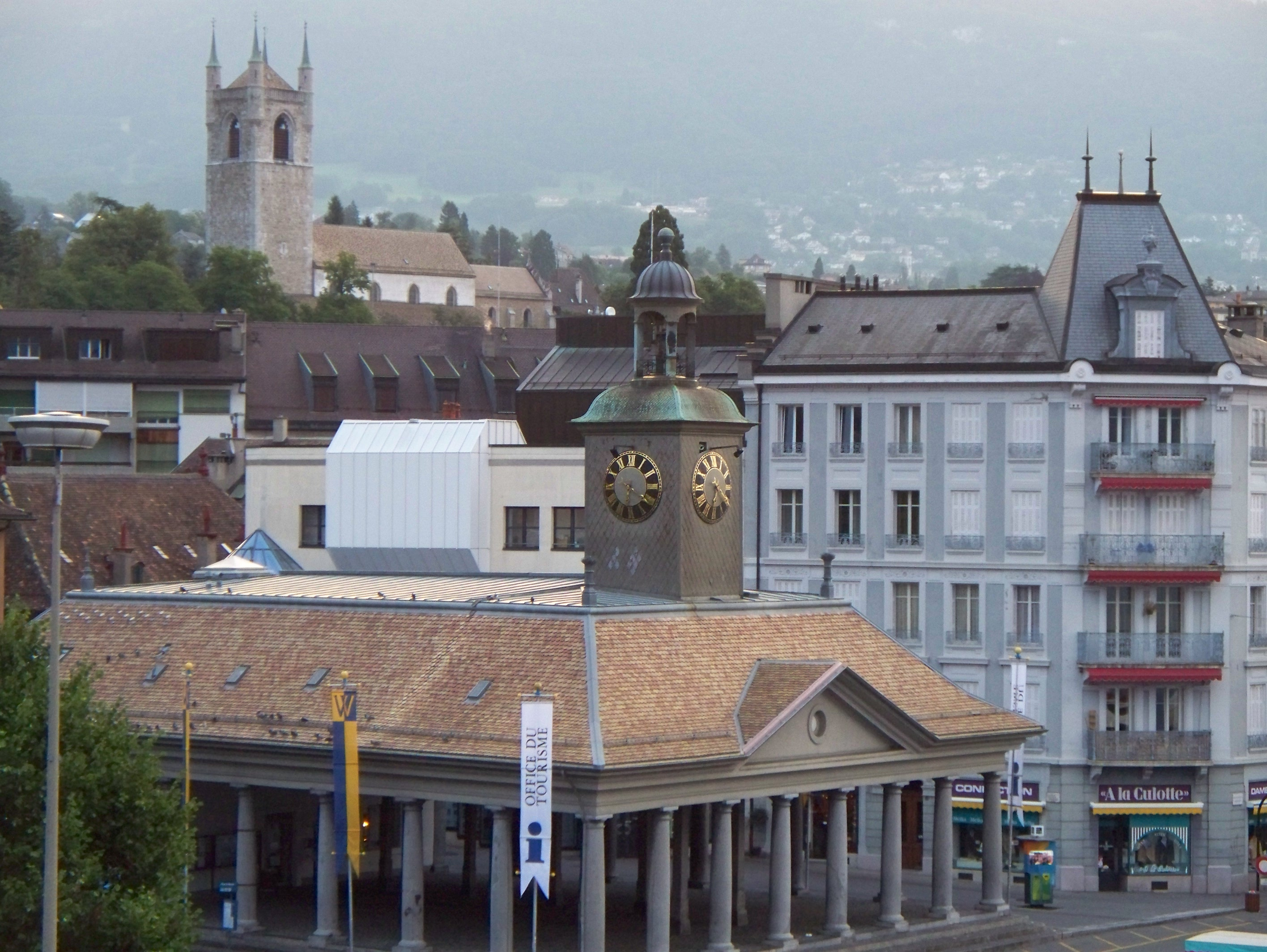
Tourism Office in Vevey

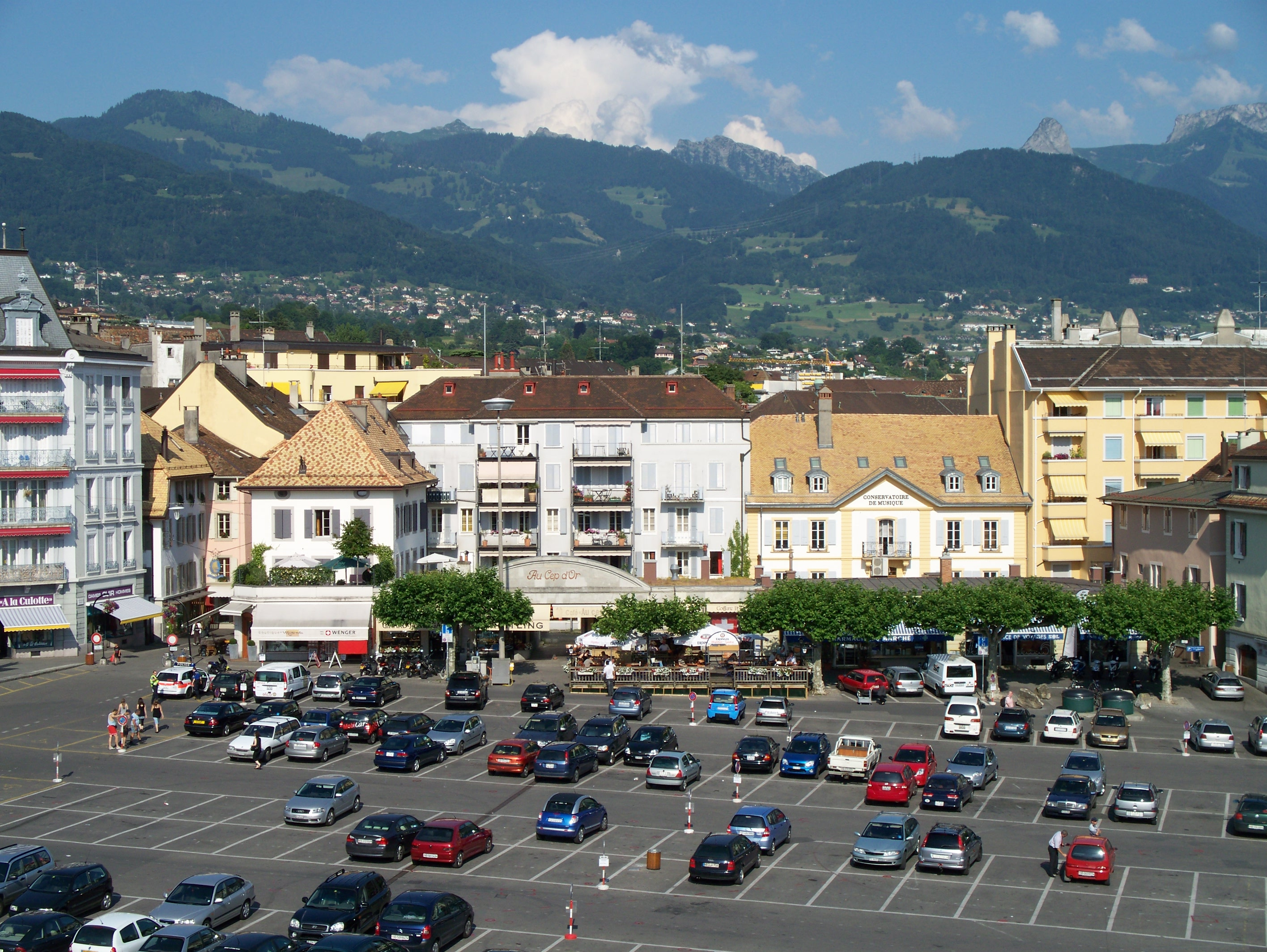
Vevey and surrounding mountains

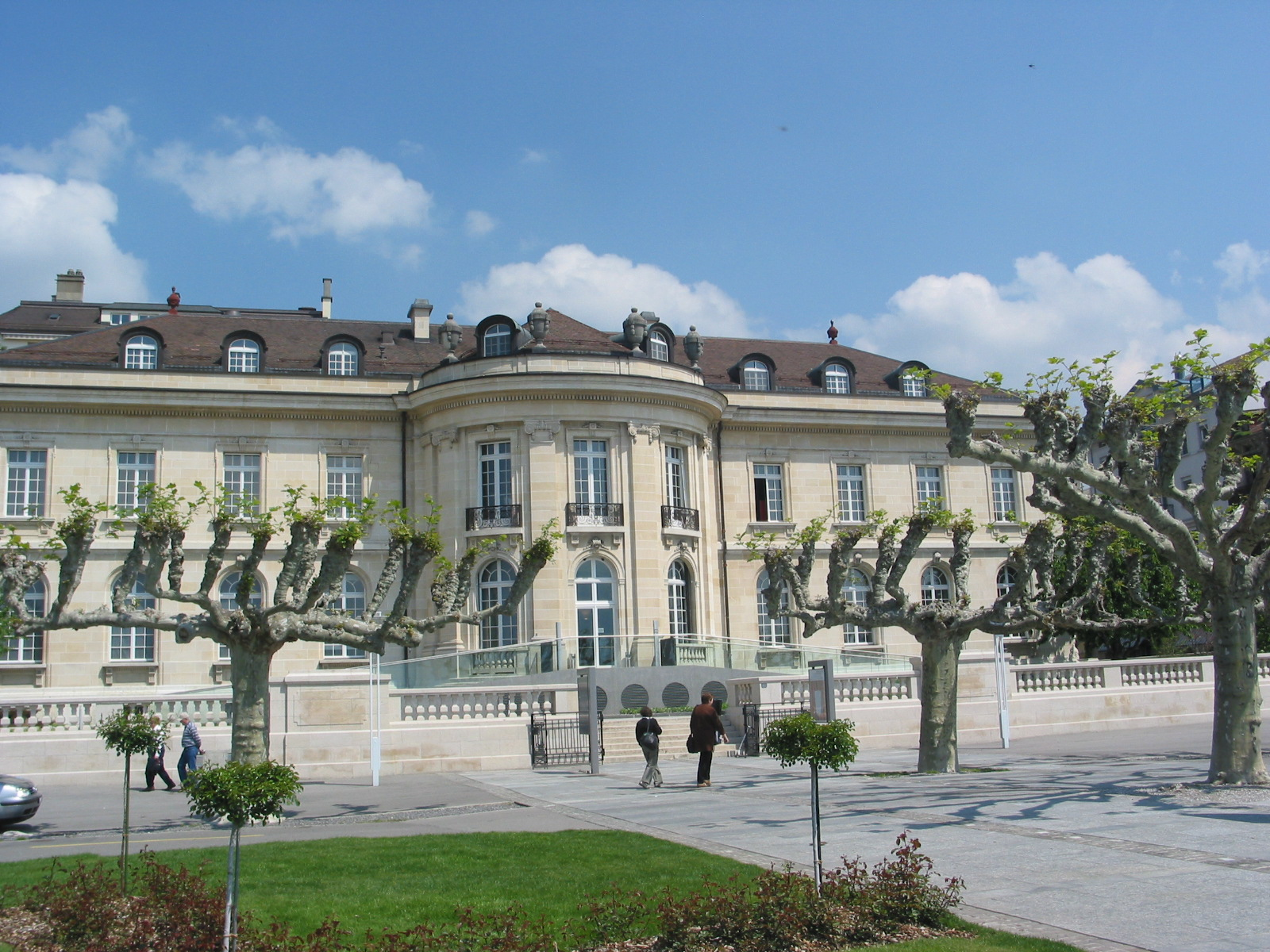
Alimentarium Museum

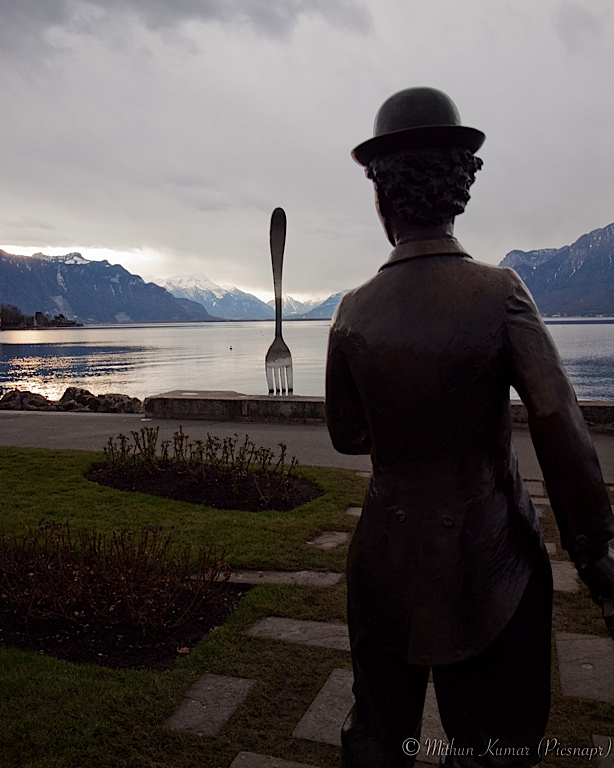
Hungry Charlie Chaplin

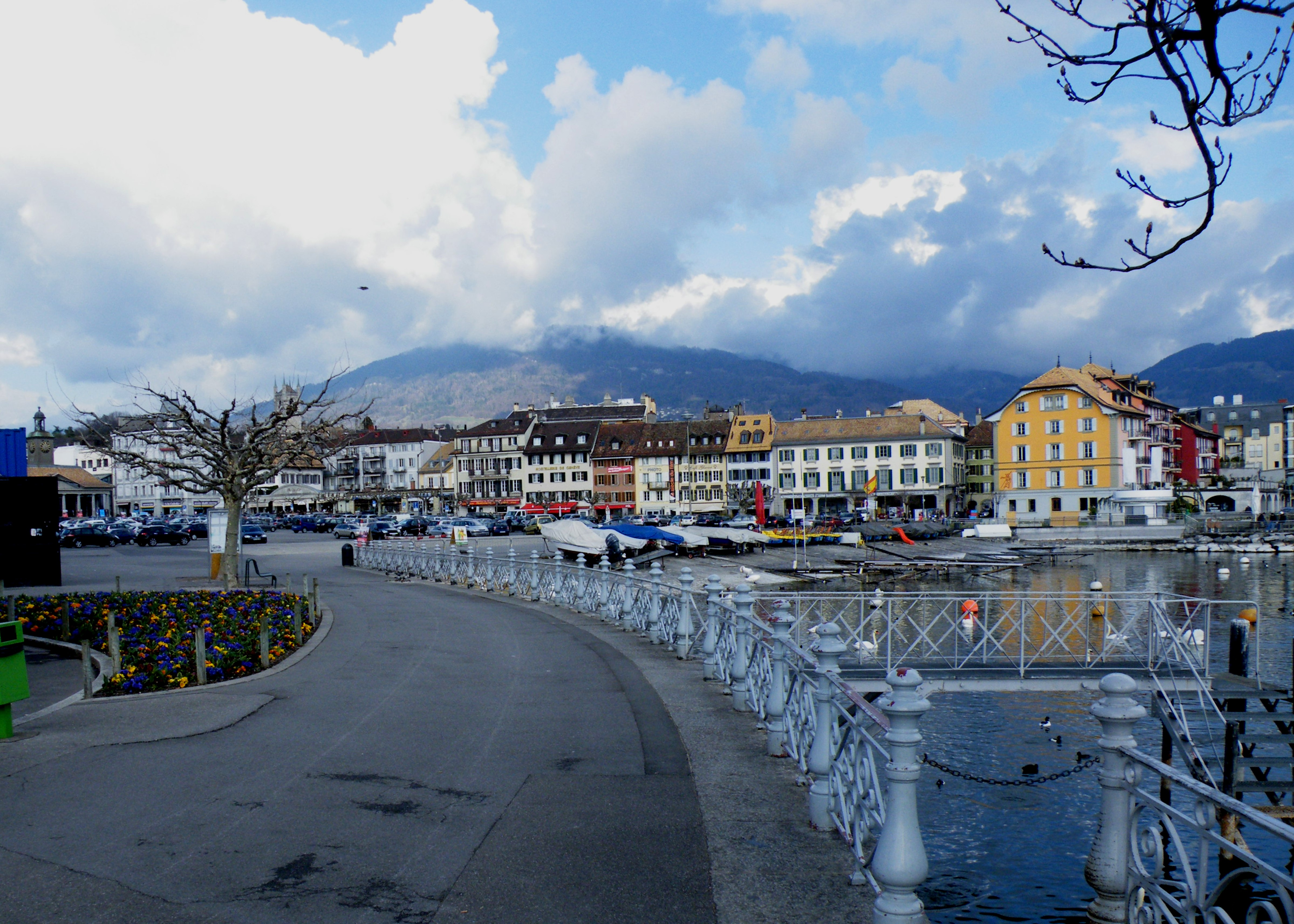
One of the biggest open Market Squares in the world

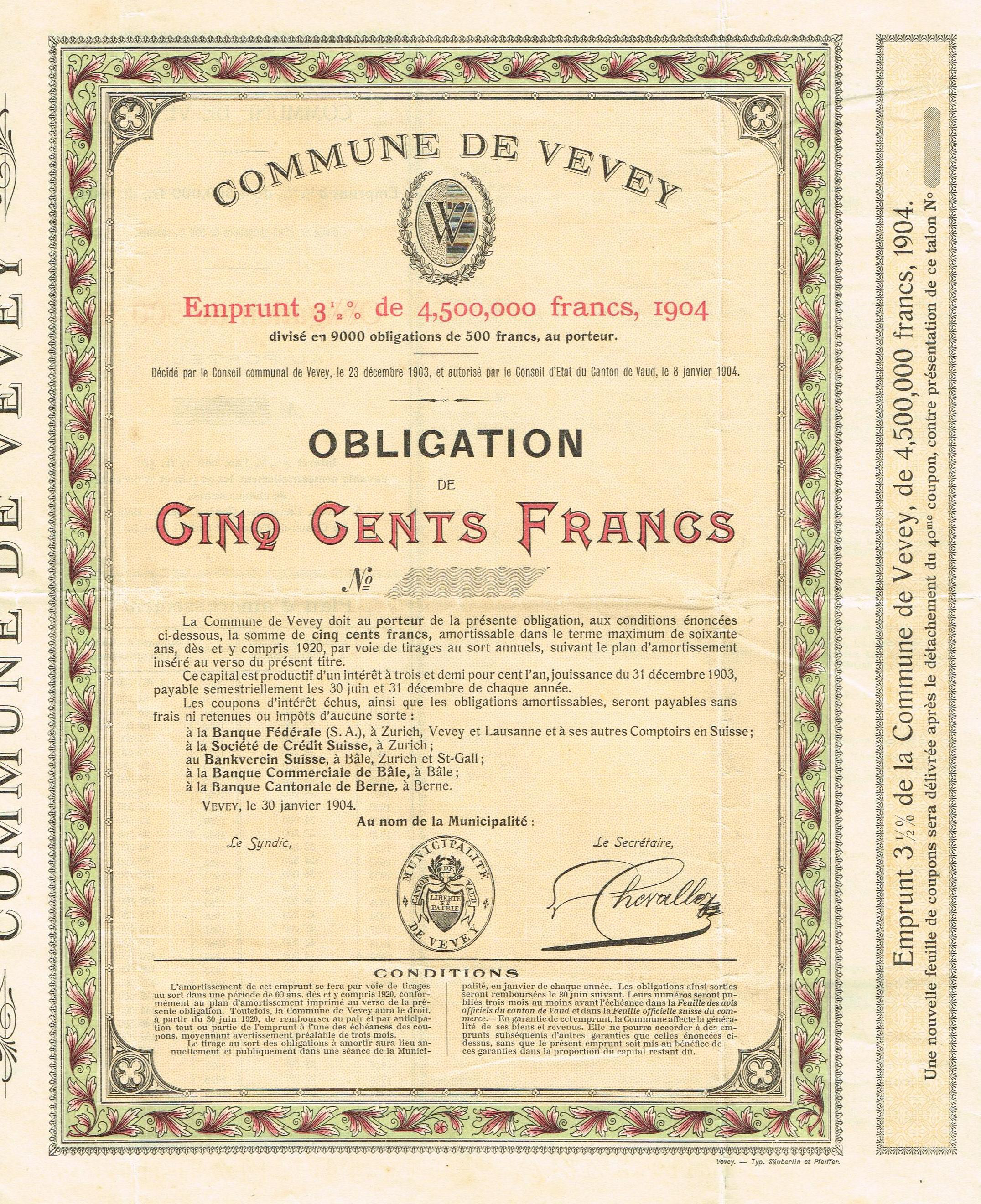
Bond of the Commune de Vevey, issued 30. January 1904

== Notable people born in Vevey ==
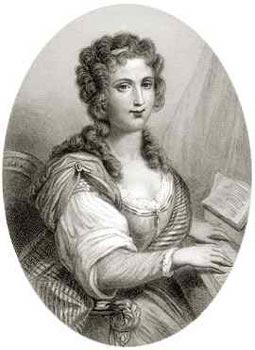
Francoise Louise Warens

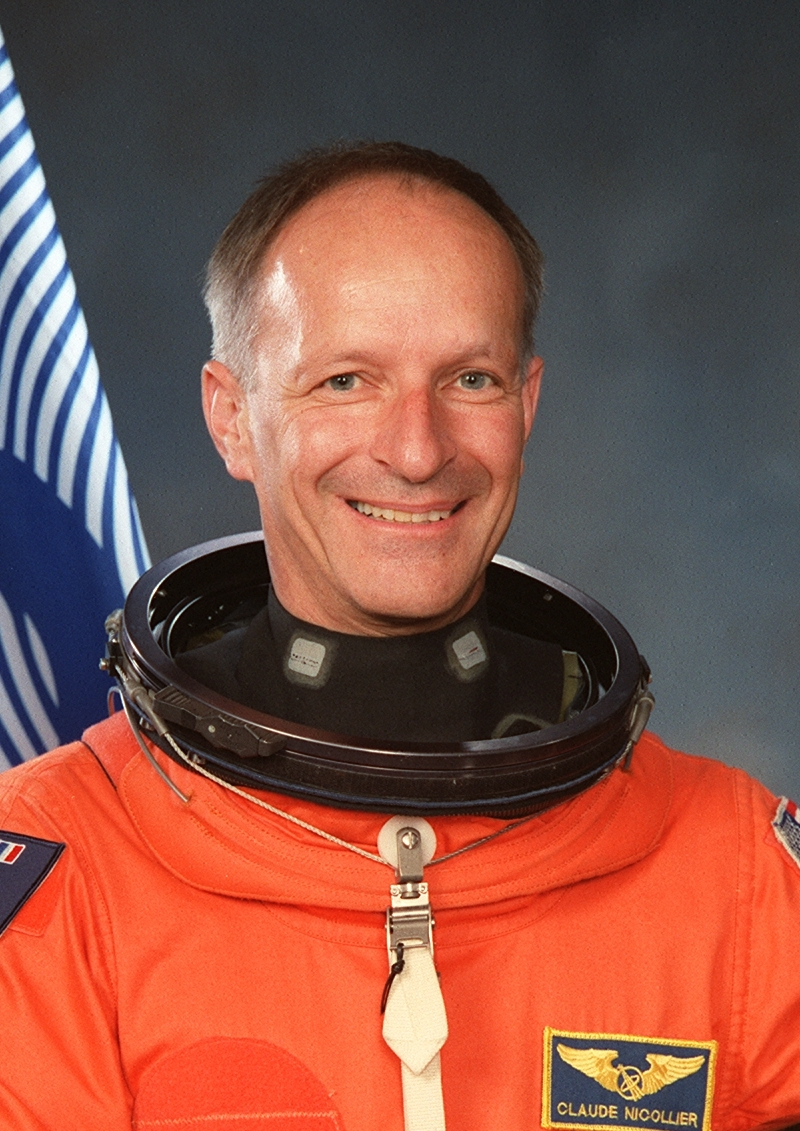
Claude Nicollier, 1999

- Abraham Ruchat (1680–1750), Protestant theologian and historian
- Françoise-Louise de Warens (1699–1762), benefactress of Jean-Jacques Rousseau
- Charles Labelye (1705–1762), bridge engineer, architect of the first Westminster Bridge
- François-Louis Cailler (1796–1852), chocolatier
- Jacques Etienne Chevalley de Rivaz (1801–1863), physician
- Alexandre Calame (1810–1864), painter
- Émile Burnat (1828–1920), botanist
- Henri Dor (1835–1912), ophthalmologist
- August Socin (1837–1899), surgeon and educator
- Sir John Pentland Mahaffy GBE CVO (1839–1919), Irish classicist and polymathic scholar
- Edmond de Palézieux (1850–1924), marine painter, amateur sailor and navigator
- Edmond Louis Budry (1854–1932), hymn writer
- Auguste de Niederhäusern (1863–1913), better known as Rodo, a sculptor and medalist
- Infante Jaime, Duke of Madrid (1870–1931), Legitimist and Carlist claimant to the French and Spanish thrones
- Gustave Roussy (1874–1948), Swiss-French neuropathologist
- Ernest Ansermet (1883–1969), orchestral conductor
- Aline Valangin (1889–1986), writer, pianist and psychoanalyst
- Marc Amsler (1891–1968), professor of ophthalmology at the University of Zurich
- Wolfgang R. Wasow (1909–1993), American mathematician
- Anne-Marie Blanc (1919–2009), film and television actress
- Jean-Pascal Delamuraz (1936–1998), politician, member of Swiss Federal Council 1983–1998
- Éric Gaudibert (1936–2012), composer in the French "avant-garde" style
- Jacques Moreillon (born 1939), Director General of the Red Cross (ICRC) until 1988
- Francis Reusser (born 1942), film director
- Claude Nicollier (born 1944), the first astronaut from Switzerland
- Antoine Chessex (born 1980), composer, saxophone player and sound artist
- RAF Camora (Raphael Ragucci, born 1984), rapper known as RAF Camora

Sport

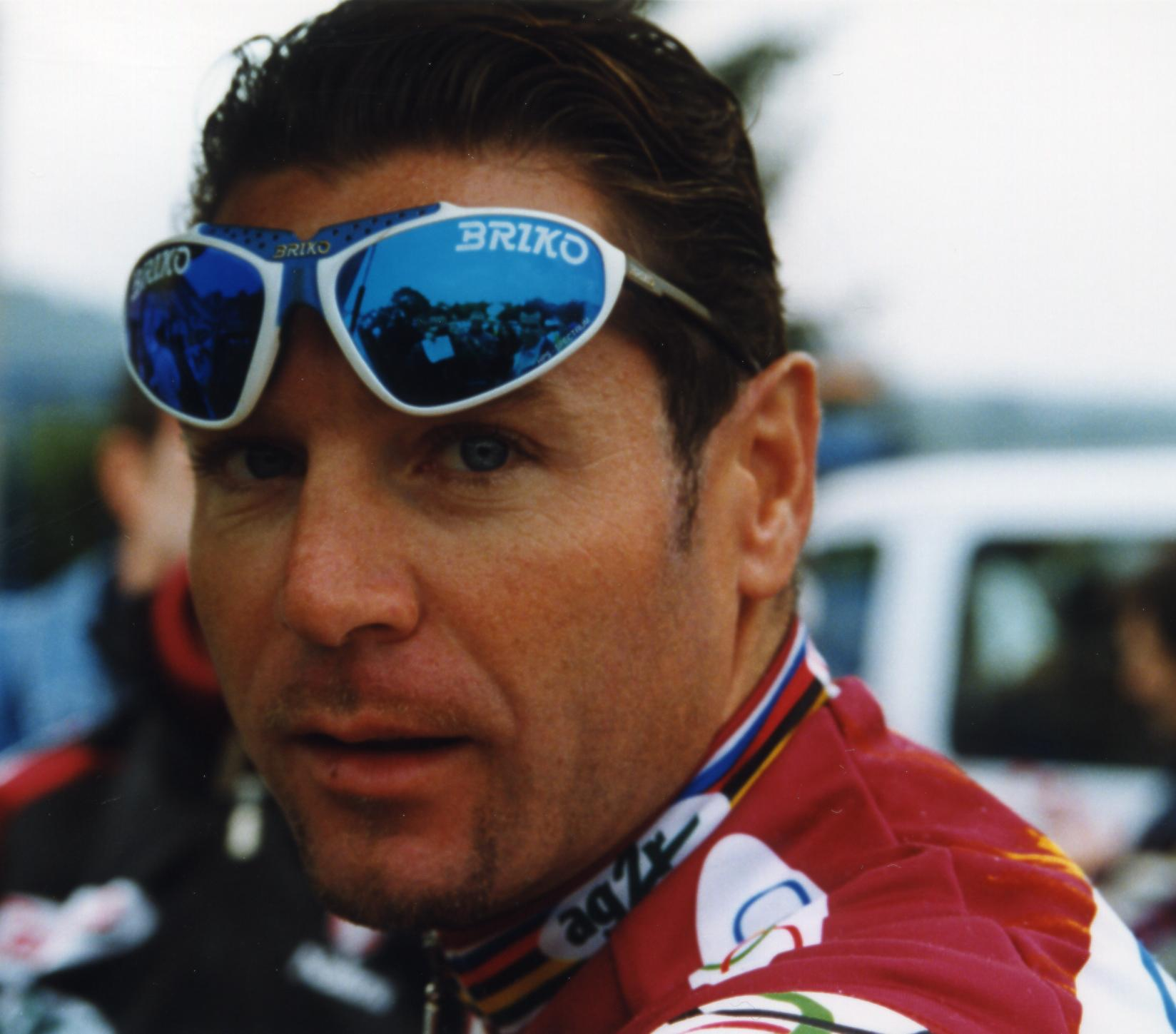
Pascal Richard, 1998

- Bruno d'Harcourt (1899–1930), French nobility and a Grand Prix motor racing driver
- Pascal Richard (born 1964), former racing cyclist, gold medalist in the 1996 Summer Olympics
- Aurélien Clerc (born 1979), former professional road bicycle racer
- Thabo Sefolosha (born 1984), professional basketball player for the Utah Jazz
- Émilie Gex-Fabry (born 1986), ski mountaineer
- Natacha Gachnang (born 1987), racing driver
- Lucas Légeret (born 2001), racing driver

== Notable residents past and present ==
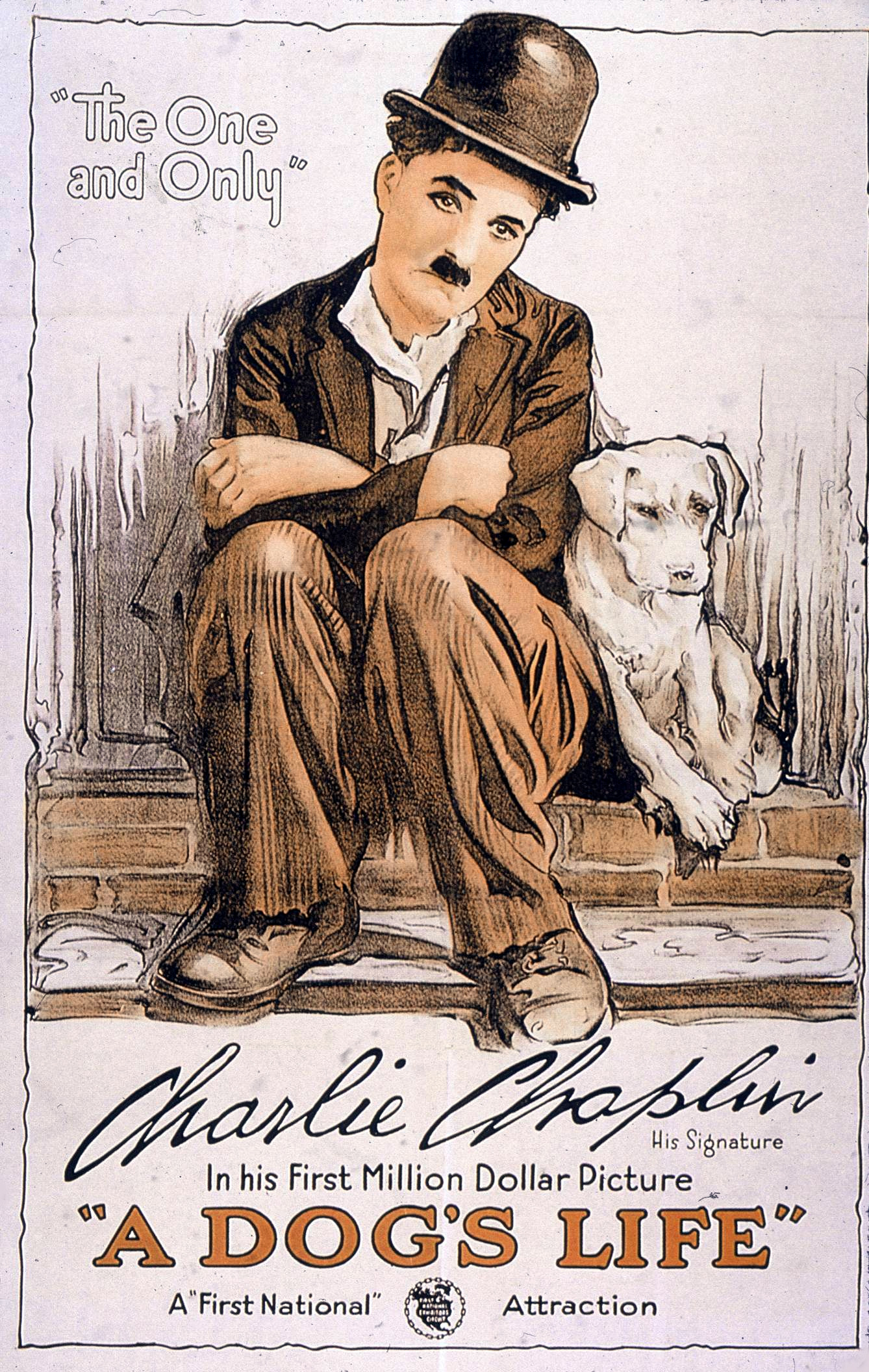
Charlie Chaplin, poster – A Dog's Life, 1918

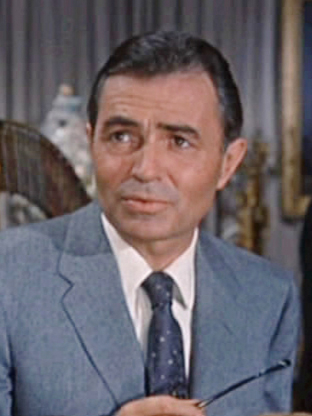
James Mason, North by Northwest, 1959

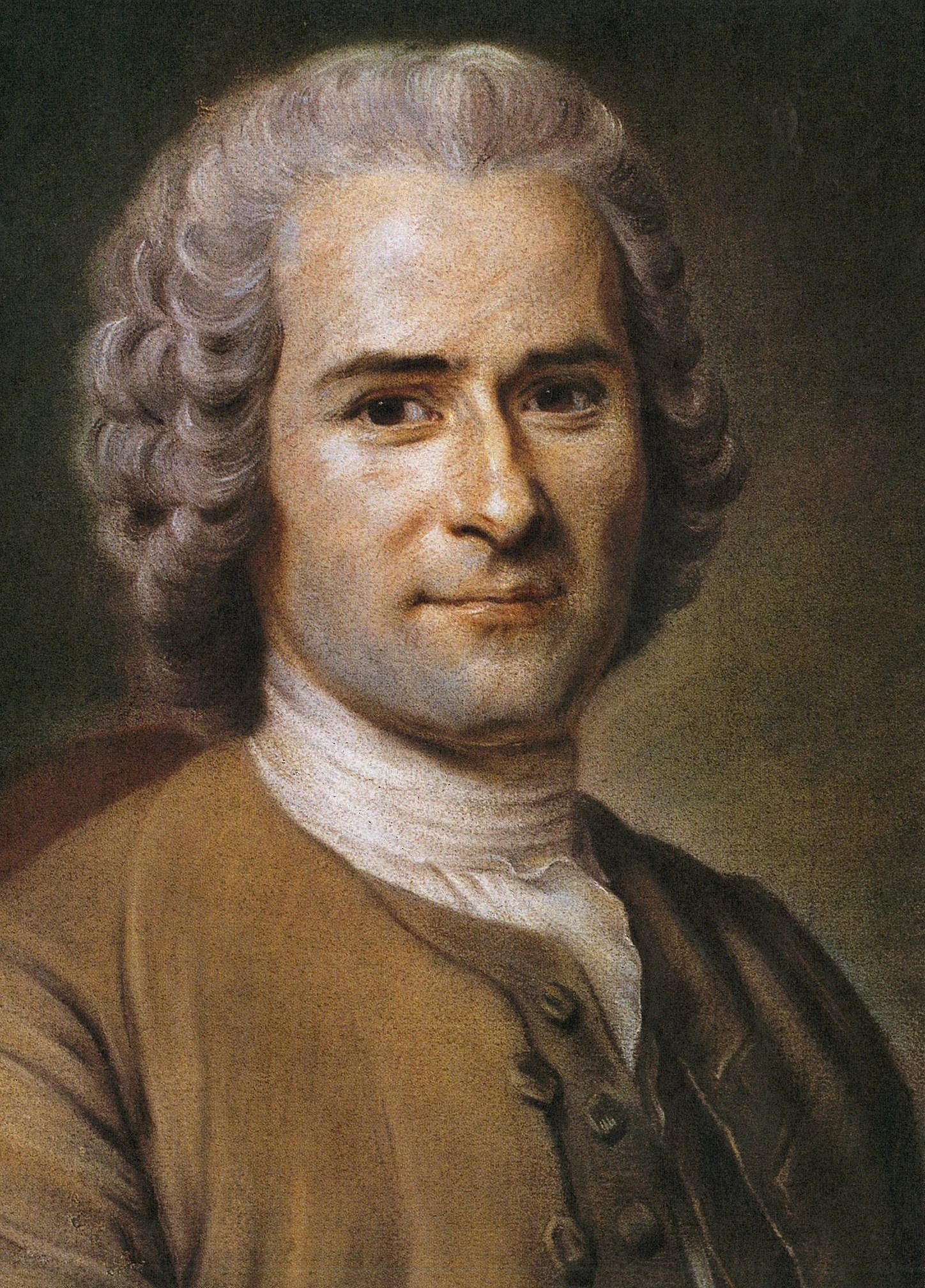
Jean-Jacques Rousseau portrait, 1753

- Olga Baclanova (1893 – 1974 in Vevey), Russian-born actress.
- Franz Brünnow (1821–1891) a German astronomer, moved to Vevey in 1880.
- Charlie Chaplin (1889–1977), British comedian, director, actor, and writer. (Corsier-sur-Vevey)
- Peter Cowie (born 1939), film historian Romantic movement
- Fyodor Dostoevsky (1821–1881), Russian novelist
- Dionizije Dvornić (1926 – 1992 in Vevey), Croatian football player
- Friedrich Engels (1820–1895), German philosopher and communist
- Nikolai Gogol (1809–1852), Russian novelist
- Graham Greene (1904–1991), British writer (Corseaux)
- Clara Haskil (1895–1960), Swiss Romanian classical pianist, lived in Vevey from 1942
- Bruno Hoffmann (1913–1991), German glass harp player
- Victor Hugo (1802–1885), French poet and writer
- Edouard Jeanneret (1887–1965), known as Le Corbusier, Swiss architect
- Duncan Jones (born 1971), film director and his father David Bowie (1947–2016), musician
- Paul Juon (1872–1940), Germanised Russian composer
- Oskar Kokoschka (1886–1980) Austrian artist of expressionistic portraits, poet and playwright
- Paul Kruger (1825 – 1904 at Clarens, near Vevey) a South African politician.
- Robert John "Mutt" Lange (born 1948), record producer and songwriter
- Edmund Ludlow (ca.1617–1692), general and politician in Oliver Cromwell's government and enemy of King Charles I.
- Nikita Magaloff (1912 – 1992 in Vevey), Georgian-Russian pianist
- Jules Massenet (1842–1912), French composer (while composing Esclarmonde)
- James Mason (1909–1984), actor, (Corsier-sur-Vevey)
- Thomas Medwin (1788–1869), writer and biographer of his cousin Percy Bysshe Shelley, honeymoon in Vevey
- John Lothrop Motley (1814–1877), author of The Rise of the Dutch Republic.
- Nubar Pasha (1825–1899) an Egyptian-Armenian politician, the first Prime Minister of Egypt; educated by Jesuits in Vevey.
- Daniel Peter (1836–1919), inventor of milk chocolate bar, lived and died in Vevey
- Jean-Jacques Rousseau (1712–1778), Swiss writer and philosopher, father of the European Romantic movement.
- Percy Scholes (1877 – 1958 in Vevey), English musician and writer
- Henryk Sienkiewicz (1846 – 1916 in Vevey), a, Polish writer, recipient of the Nobel Prize in Literature. His statue stands in the garden of the Grand Hôtel du Lac.
- Jacob Spon (1647 – 1685 in Vevey) a French doctor and archaeologist.
- Henry Philip Tappan (1805–1881), first president of the University of Michigan
- Shania Twain (born 1965), Canadian country singer-songwriter

== International relations ==
=== Twin towns – sister cities ===
Vevey is twinned with:

Carpentras, France	Locarno, Switzerland	Müllheim, Germany

Vevay, Indiana

== See also ==
- Vevay, Indiana, United States
