= Musée Jenisch =

Coordinates: 46.4615°N 6.8453°E

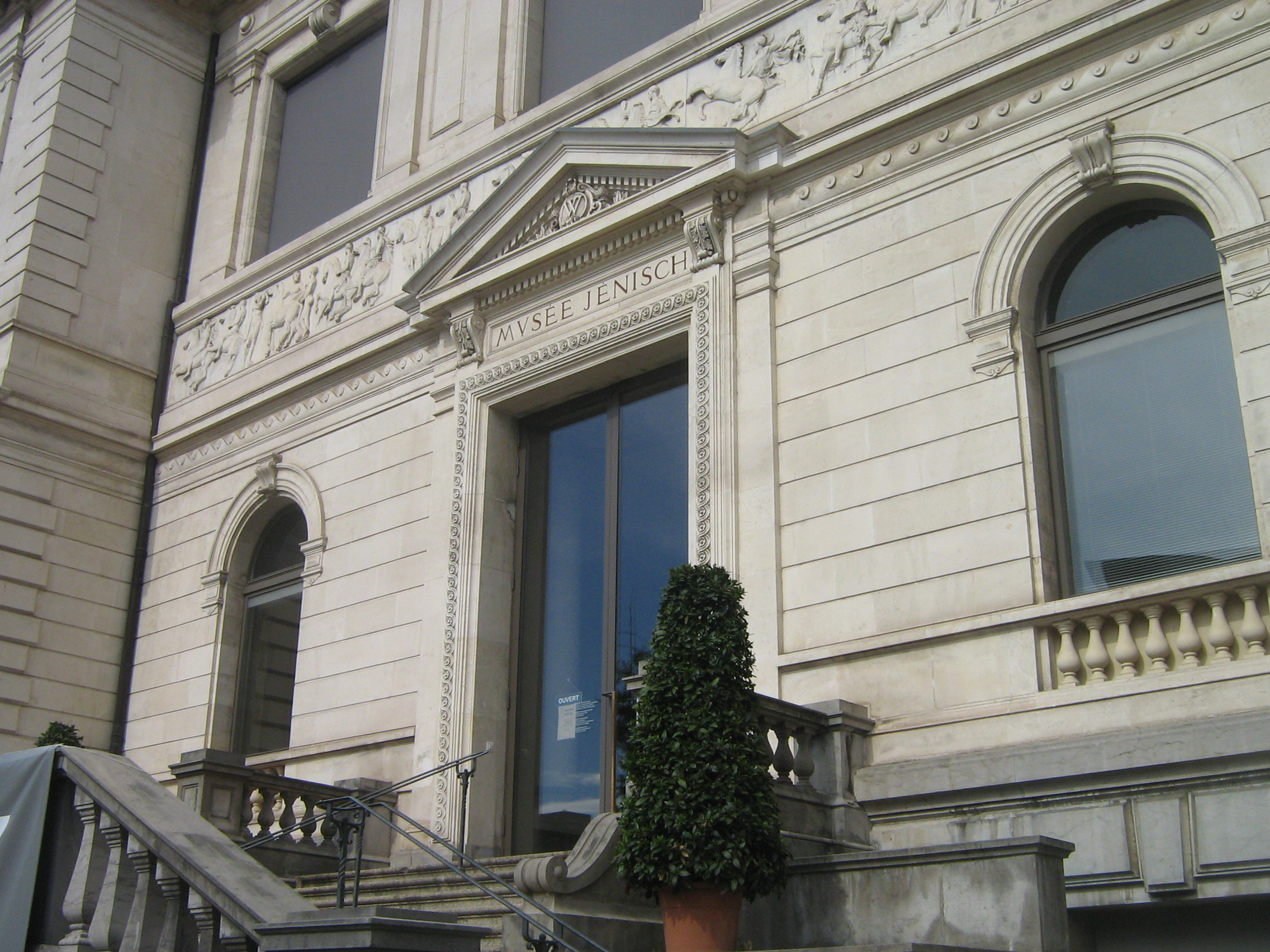
- Established: 1897
- Location: Vevey, Switzerland
- Type: Art museum
- Website: www.museejenisch.ch

The Musée Jenisch is a museum of fine arts and prints at Vevey in Vaud in Switzerland. It was set up on 10 March 1897, thanks to a legacy of 200,000 francs from Fanny Henriette Jenisch (1801–1881), wife of Martin Johann Jenisch (de), a senator of Hamburg. It was designed in the neo-classical style by the architect Louis Maillard and Robert Convert.

== See also ==
- List of museums in Switzerland
