= Fork of Vevey =

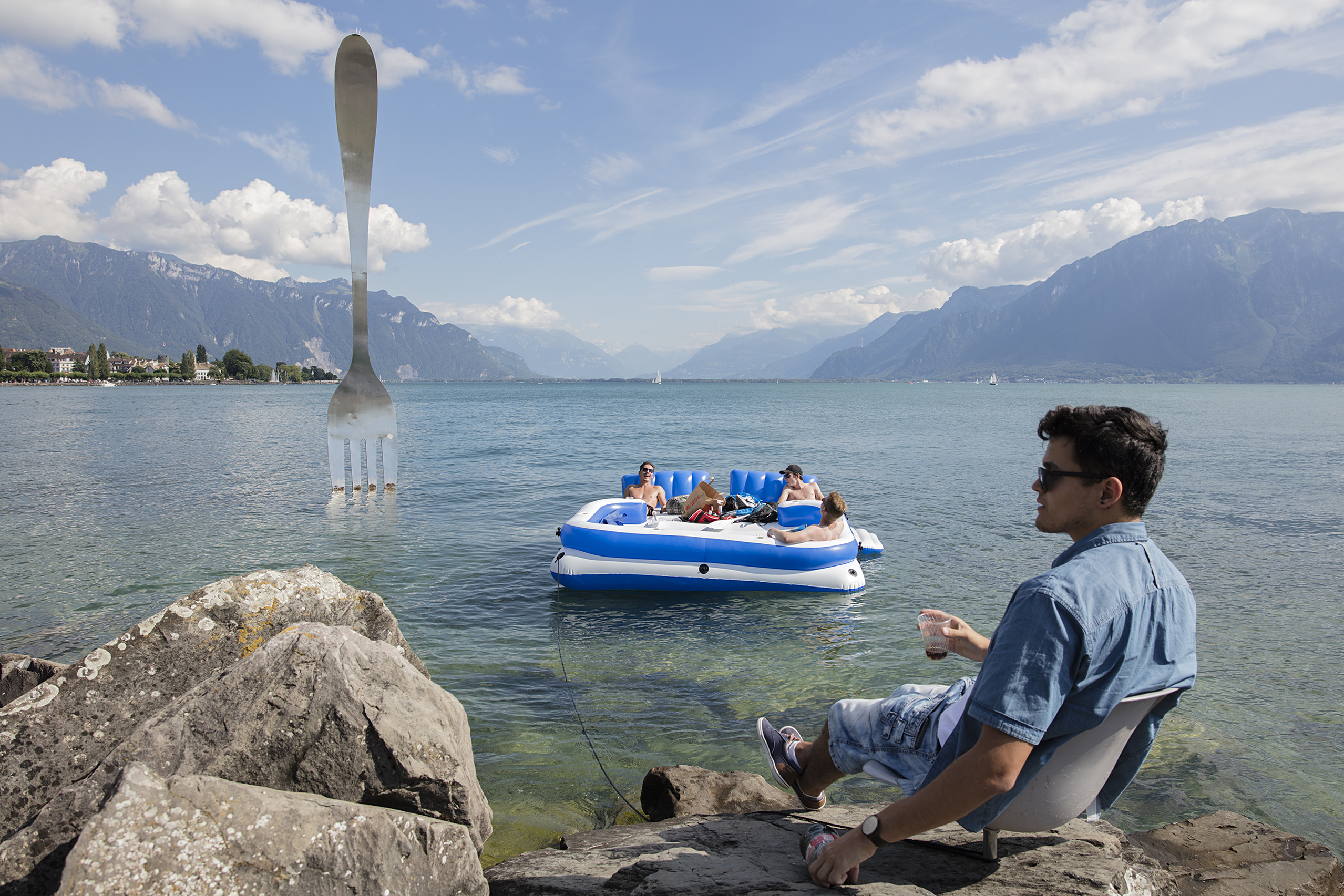
- Fork of Vevey, 18 July 2020
- Interactive map of Fork of Vevey
- Location: Lake Léman, Vevey, Switzerland
- Coordinates: 46°27′28″N 6°50′47″E
- Governing body: Alimentarium (museum of food)
- Website: Fork of Vevey

Fork of Vevey (French: La Fourchette de Vevey) is an 8-metre-tall (26 ft), 1.3-metre-wide (4.3 ft) stainless steel fork on the shore of Lake Geneva (Lac Leman) in Vevey, Switzerland. Fork of Vevey is a part of the Alimentarium, a Vevey-based museum with a permanent exhibition on food and Nestlé's history.

The fork was initially created in 1995 by the Swiss artists Jean-Pierre Zaugg and C.Toda to mark the Alimentarium's tenth anniversary. The fork was removed in 1996 but reinstated about a decade later, following a public petition. The Alimentarium claims that the Fork of Vevey is the world's largest fork, and since 2014 the Guinness Book of World Records has listed it as such, but there is a larger fork (11 metres (36 ft) long) in Springfield, Missouri, and an even larger one (12 metres (39 ft) long) in Creede, Colorado.

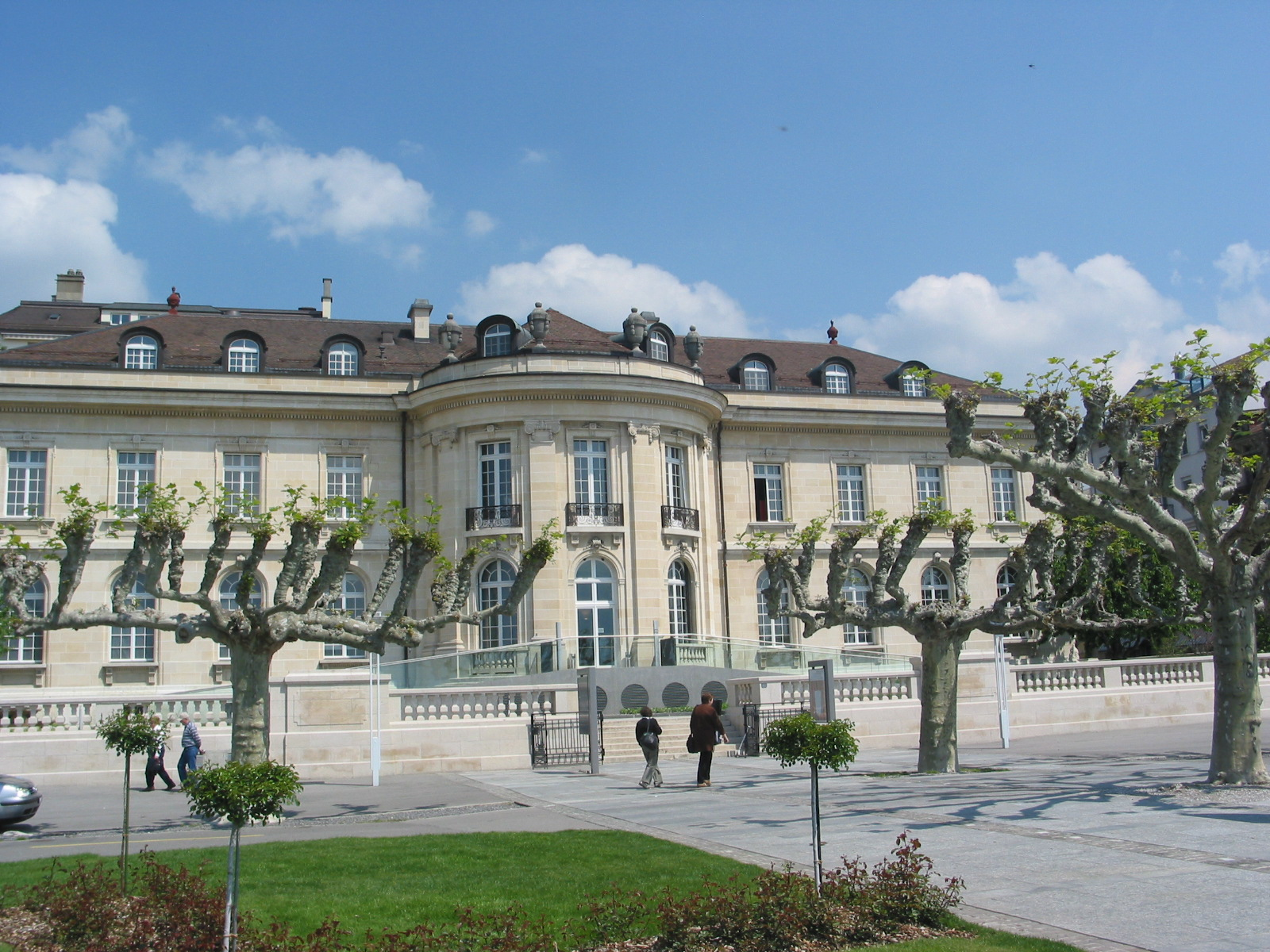
Alimentarium (museum of food) in Vevey, Switzerland

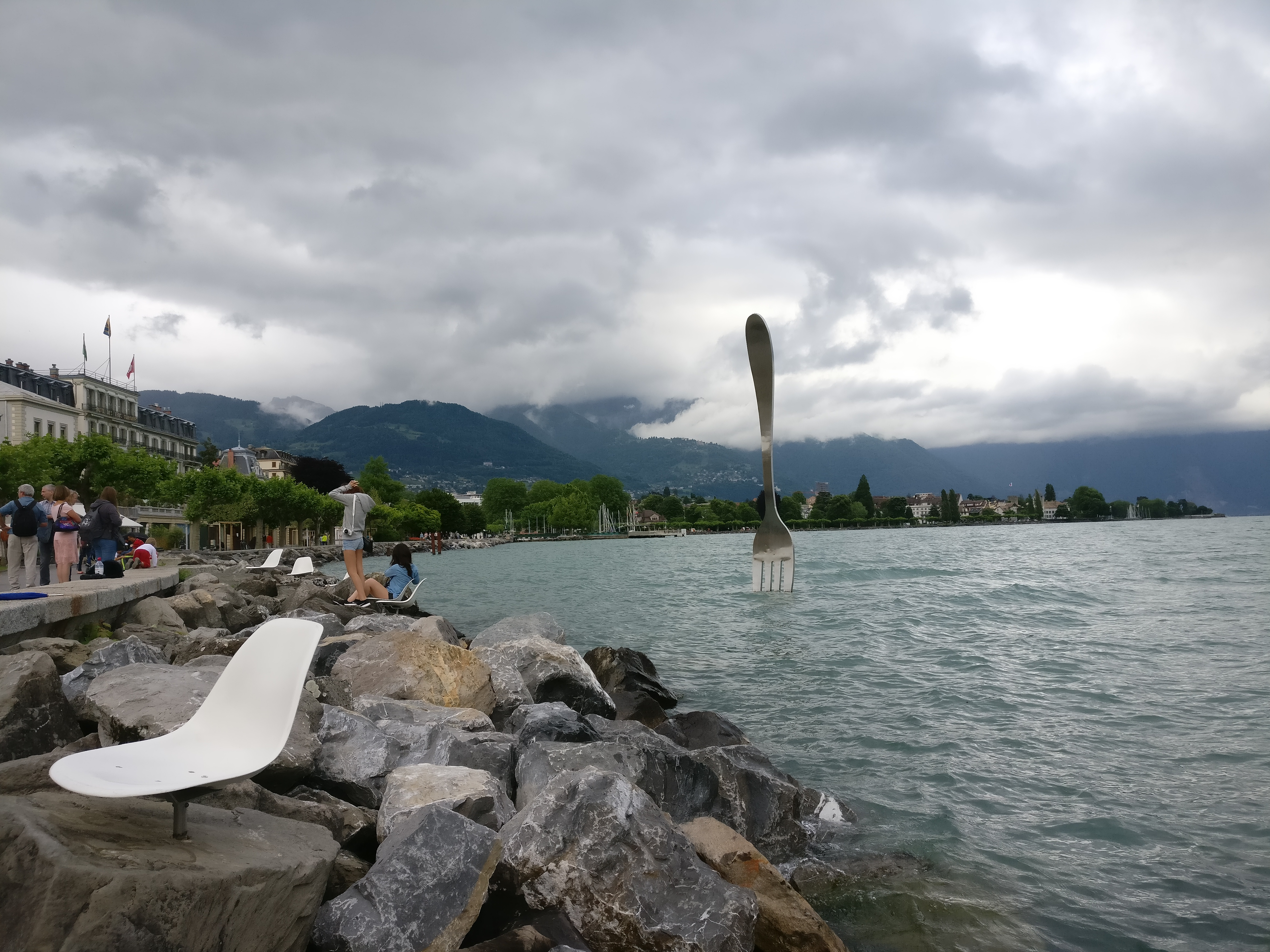
Fork of Vevey

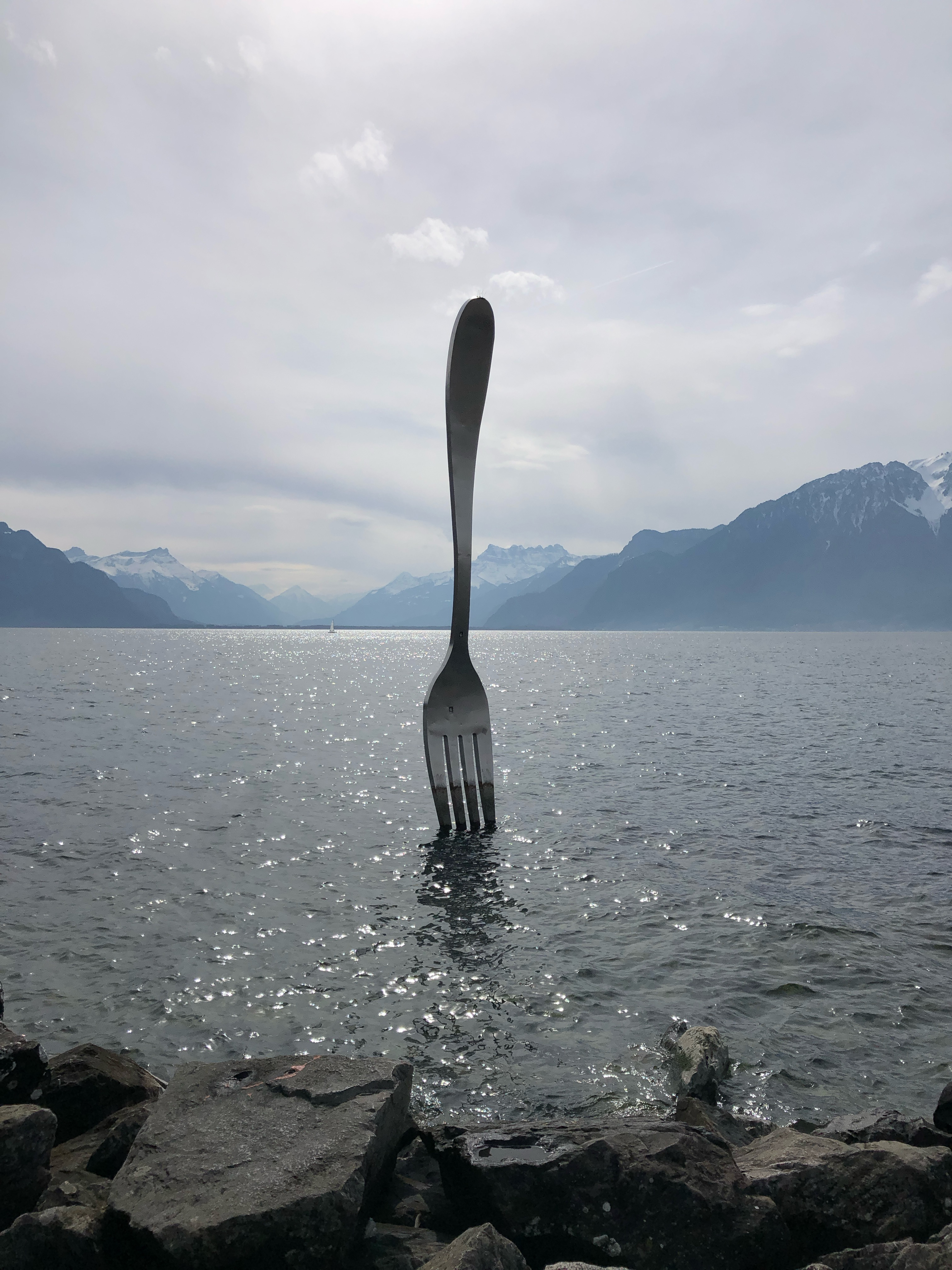
Fork of Vevey, Switzerland
