= List of mayors of Pakistan =

List of current mayors of Pakistan according to the 2015 local government elections

== List of major cities of Pakistan ==
#	Mayor	Deputy Mayor	Took office	City	Population	Affiliation	Notes
1	Murtaza Wahab	Salman Abdullah Murad	Jun 15, 2023	Karachi, Sindh	24,300,625	PPP	page
2	Colonel (r) Mubashir Javed	*	Dec 31, 2016	Lahore, Punjab	10,355,000	PML-N	Page
3	Razzak Malik	*	Dec 31, 2016	Faisalabad, Punjab	4,075,000	PML-N	page
4	Tayyab Hussain	Sohail Mashadi	Aug 30, 2016	Hyderabad, Sindh	3,437,798	MQM	page
5	Arbab Asim Khan	Syed Qasim Ali Shah	Aug 30, 2015	Peshawar, Khyber Pakhtunkhwa	3,233,252	PTI	page
6	Sardar Naseem	Chaudhry Tariq Mahmood	Dec 31, 2016	Rawalpindi, Punjab	3,198,911	PML-N	page
7	Ali Pasha	Sulman Khalid Butt	Dec 31, 2016	Gujranwala, Punjab	2,723,009	PML-N	
8	Shahid Hameed Chandia	Sheikh Israr Ahmad	Dec 31, 2016	D.G Khan, Punjab	2,713,520	PML-N	
9	Sheikh Ansar Aziz	*	Mar 04, 2016	Islamabad, Capital Territory	2,082,262	PML(N)	page
10	Chaudhry Naveed Arain	khalid khan	Dec 31, 2016	Multan, Punjab	2,050,000	PML-N	page
11	Kaleem Ullah Kakar	Younus Baloch	Jan 29, 2015	Quetta, Balochistan	1,642,410	PKMAP, PML(N)	page
12	Aqeel Najam Hashmi	Munir Iqbal	Dec 31, 2016	Bahawalpur, Punjab	1,052,000	PML-N	
13	Ch Tauheed Akhtar	Ch Bashir Ahmed	Dec 31, 2016	sialkot, Punjab	920,000	PML-N	
14	Arsalan Shaikh	Tariq Chauhan	Aug 30, 2016	Sukkur, Sindh	900,148	PPP	page
16	Muhammad Aslam Shaikh	Anwar Ali Luhar	Aug 30, 2016	Larkana, Sindh	522,315	PPP	page
17	Asad Baloch	Majid Naeem Bazmi	Dec 31, 2016	sahiwal, Punjab	207,388	PML-N	

* Multiple Mayors

== List of Khyber Pakhtunkhwa District nazims ==
This is the list of 23 District Nazims and Naib Nazims of Khyber Pakhtunkhwa.

#	Nazim	Naib Nazim	Took office	District	Affiliation	Notes
1	Sardar Sher Bahader	Shoukat Tanoli	Aug 30, 2015	Abbottabad	IND	
2	Said Ghulam	Ghulam Murtaza	Aug 30, 2015	Mansehra	PML(N)	
3	Adil Islam	Agha Shabir Ahmad Awan	Aug 30, 2015	Haripur	PTI	
4	Atta-ur-Rehman	Faheem Akbar Khan	Aug 30, 2015	Battagram	PTI	
5			Aug 30, 2015	Bannu		
6	Fahad Khan Utmanzai	Musawir Khan Durrani	Aug 30, 2015	Charsadda	PTI/JI	
7	Azizullah Alizai	Muhammad Ismail	Aug 30, 2015	D.I. Khan	PTI	
8	Obaid Ullah	Said Umar	Aug 30, 2015	Hangu	JUI(F)/IND	
9	Umar Daraz	Maj (R) Muhammad Sajad	Aug 30, 2015	Karak	PTI	
10	Niaz Muhammad Khan	Abdu-ur-Rashid Khan	Aug 30, 2015	Kohat	JUI(F)/PML(N)	
11	Ishfaq Ahmad Khan	Arab Khan	Aug 30, 2015	Lakki Marwat	PPP/PTI	
12	Himayat Ullah Mayar	Asad Ali	Aug 30, 2015	Mardan	ANP/PPP	
13	Liqat Khattak	Ishfaq Ahmad	Aug 30, 2015	Nowshera	PTI	
14	Muhammad Asim Khan	Syed Qasim Ali Shah	Aug 30, 2015	Peshawar	PTI	
15	Mustafa Kundi	Aftab Ahmad	Aug 30, 2015	Tank	PTI	
16	Amer Rehman	Aser Khan	Aug 30, 2015	Swabi	ANP/JUI(F)	
17	Muhammad Ali Shah	Abdu-ul-Jabbar Khan	Aug 30, 2015	Swat	PML(N)/ANP	
18	Niaz Ahmad	Kamran Iqbal	Aug 30, 2015	Shangla	PML(N)/PPP	
19	Ubaid Ullah	Yousaf Ali	Aug 30, 2015	Buner	JI/ANP	
20	Faseeh Ullah	Hanif ullah	Aug 30, 2015	U.Dir	JI	
21	Muhammad Rasool	Abdul Rashid	Aug 30, 2015	L.Dir	JI	
22	Syed Ahmad Ali Shah	Col (R) Ibrar Hussian	Aug 30, 2015	Malakand	PPP/ANP	
23	Maghfirat Shah	Abdul Shakoor	Aug 30, 2015	Chitral	JUI(F)	

== List of Balochistan mayors ==
Chapter 3 "COMPOSITION OF LOCAL COUNCILS", clause 14 declares

14. Election of Chairmen of Local Councils.- For every Local Council there shall be a Chairman who shall be elected in the prescribed manner: Provided that the Chairman of Metropolitan Corporation may be designated as Mayor.

According to Balochistan local Govt Act 2010, it has only one mayor for Quetta Metropolitan Corporation.

#	Mayors	Deputy Mayors	Took office	City	Affiliation	Population	Notes
1	Kaleem Ullah Kakar	Younus Baloch	Jan 29, 2015	Quetta, Balochistan	1,642,410	PKMAP, PML(N)	page

== List of Punjab mayors ==
there are total of 12 mayors in Punjab for 11 municipal corporations and one metropolitan corporation.

The Punjab Local Govt defines mayor and deputy mayor as:

(k) “Deputy Mayor” means a Deputy Mayor of the Metropolitan Corporation or a Municipal Corporation;

(x) “Mayor” means the Mayor of the Metropolitan Corporation or a Municipal Corporation;

PLGA 2013 also defines Metropolitan and municipal corporations as;

(z) “Metropolitan Corporation” means Metropolitan Corporation Lahore;

CHAPTER III CONSTITUTION OF LOCAL GOVERNMENTS

(d) an integrated urban area having a population of more than five hundred thousand to be a Municipal Corporation.

#	Metropolitan Corp
1	Lahore

#	Municipal Corporation
1	Faisalabad
2	Rawalpindi
3	Multan
4	Gujranwala
5	Murree
6	sargodha
7	sahiwal
8	sialkot
9	gujrat
10	bhawalpur
11	D.G Khan

#	Mayor	Deputy Mayor	Took office	City	Population	Affiliation	Notes
1	Colonel (r) Mubashir Javed	Muhammad Mushtaq Mughal, Waseem Qadir, Nazir Ahmed Sawati, Ijaz Ahmed Hafeez, Mehar Mahmood Ahmed, Mian Muhammad Tariq, Muhammad Bilal Chaudhry, Haji Allah Rakha and Rao Shahab-ud-Din	Dec 31, 2016	Lahore, Punjab	10,355,000	PML-N	Page
2	Razzak Malik	Sheikh Muhammad Yousaf, Muhammad Ameen Butt and Chaudhry Abdul Ghafoor	Dec 31, 2016	Faisalabad, Punjab	4,075,000	PML-N	page
3	Sardar Naseem	Chaudhry Tariq Mahmood	Dec 31, 2016	Rawalpindi, Punjab	3,198,911	PML-N	page
4	Chaudhry Naveed Arain	Munawar Ehsan Qureshi and Saeed Ahmad	Dec 31, 2016	Multan, Punjab	2,050,000	PML-N	page
5	Aqeel Najam Hashmi	Munir Iqbal	Dec 31, 2016	bhawalpur, Punjab	1,052,000	PML-N	
6	Ali Pasha	Salman Khalid Pomi Butt	Dec 31, 2016	Gujranwala, Punjab	2,723,009	PML-N	
7	Ch Tauheed Akhtar	Ch Bashir Ahmed	Dec 31, 2016	sialkot, Punjab	920,000	PML-N	
8			Dec 31, 2016	sargodha, Punjab	1,500,000	PML-N	
9	Asad Baloch	Majid Naeem Bazmi	Dec 31, 2016	sahiwal, Punjab	207,388	PML-N	
10			Dec 31, 2016	gujrat, Punjab	2,048,008	PML-N	
11	Shahid Hameed Chandia	Sheikh Israr Ahmad	Dec 31, 2016	D.G Khan, Punjab	2,713,520	PML-N	
12	stayed	stayed	Dec 31, 2016	Murree, Punjab	25,247	PML-N	

== List of Sindh mayors ==
There are 4 mayors of Sindh, one mayor for metropolitan corporation, 3 mayors for municipal corporations.

The Sindh Local Govt defines mayor and deputy mayor as:

x. ‘Chairman’ means the chairman and include chairperson of Council constituted under the Act but in the case of a Municipal Corporation or a Metropolitan Corporation, the Chairman may be called the Mayor.

xlviii. “Mayor” means the Mayor of a Corporation;

xxi. “Deputy Mayor” means the Deputy Mayor of the Corporation;

CHAPTER- III CONSTITUTION AND COMPOSITION OF COUNCILS,

(4) Metropolitan Corporation. There shall be a Metropolitan Corporation for Karachi Division

#	Metropolitan Corp
1	Karachi

#	Municipal Corporation
1	Hyderabad
2	Sukkur
3	Larkana

#	Mayor	Deputy Mayor	Took office	City	Population	Affiliation	Notes
1	Wasim Akhtar	Arshad Vohra	Aug 30, 2016	Karachi, Sindh	24,300,625	MQM	page
2	Sohail Mashadi	Sohail Mashadi	jan 10, 2019	Hyderabad, Sindh	3,437,798	MQM	page
3	Arsalan Shaikh	Tariq Chauhan	Aug 30, 2016	Sukkur, Sindh	900,148	PPP	page
4	Muhammad Aslam Shaikh	Anwar Ali Luhar	Aug 30, 2016	Larkana, Sindh	522,315	PPP	page

#	Chairman	Deputy Chairman	Took office	City	Population	Affiliation	Notes
1	Farooq Jameel Durrani	Fareed Ahmed	Aug 30, 2016	Mirpurkhas Sindh	612,520	MQM	Page
