= Next Islamabad local government elections =

Upcoming local government elections in Islamabad, Pakistan

- TBD

TBD union councils + 3 town corporations
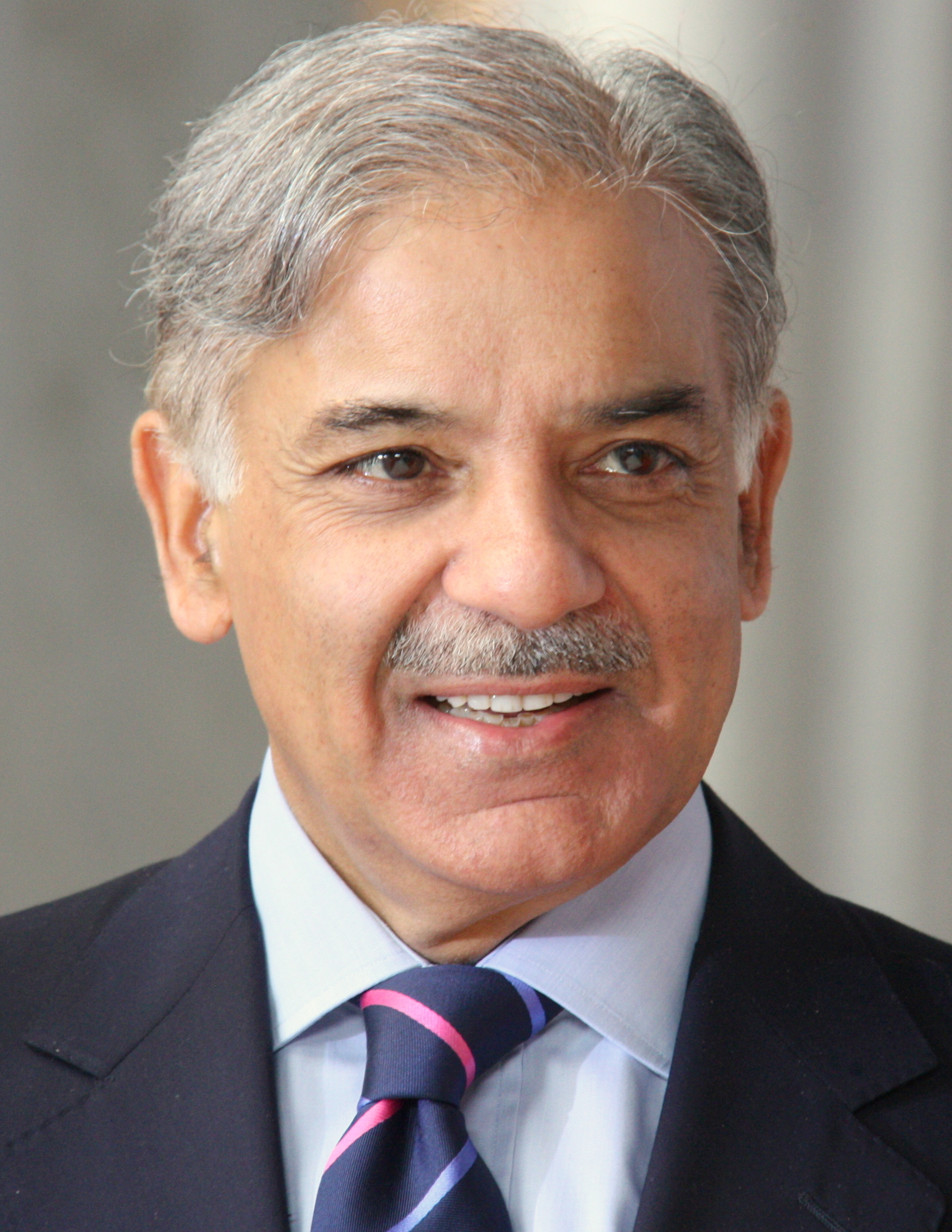

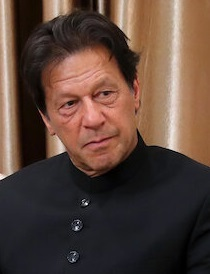

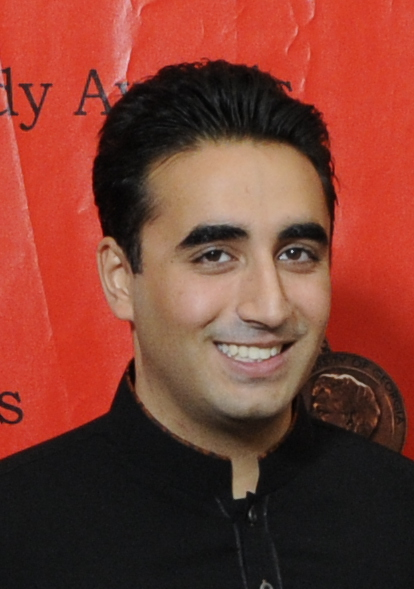
	Majority party	Minority party	Third party
Leader	Shehbaz Sharif	Imran Khan	Bilawal Bhutto
Party	PML(N)	PTI	PPP
Leader since	13 March 2018	25 April 1996	30 Dec 2007
Mayor of Islamabad before election
Pir Adil Gillani
PML-N
Elected Mayor of Islamabad
TBD

The Next Islamabad local government elections or the Islamabad local bodies election, (Urdu: اسلام آباد بلدیاتی انتخابات) will be held in the Islamabad Capital Territory. Around one million voters will choose their representatives in the federal capital's long-delayed local government elections, according to a schedule released by the Election Commission of Pakistan.

The candidates for the Pakistan Muslim League (N) (PML-N) and Pakistan Tehreek-e-Insaf (PTI) sparred a lot during the most recent elections, which were conducted in 2015. The PML-N won the elections, and Sheikh Ansar Aziz was later elected as Islamabad's first mayor. Aziz later resigned in 2020 and was replaced by Pir Adil Gillani.

== Background ==
Elections in Islamabad were long overdue since the Islamabad Metropolitan Corporation, the city's previous municipal administration, finished its five-year term in February 2021. The government and the Election Commission of Pakistan (ECP) both failed to hold the elections within the required four months. The ECP has finally released the election timetable for Islamabad's 101 Union Councils (UCs) after an egregious delay. The number of UCs has now been expanded by the government from 50 to 101 due to Islamabad’s population increase according to the 2017 census.

On 23 December 2022, the Senate passed a bill that increased the number of UCs from 101 to 125. On 27 December 2022, a five-member bench of the ECP, headed by the Chief Election Commissioner, conducted a hearing which concluded in the postponement of the elections “for the time being”. Because of the increase in the number of UCs, the ECP would have to conduct fresh delimitations and redo the whole election process, which would at least take 4 months. On 30 December 2022, the Islamabad High Court (IHC) accepted identical petitions filed by the PTI and Jamaat-e-Islami (JI) set aside the ECP’s order of postponement of the elections and directed it to hold the elections as per schedule, that is on 31 December 2022.

However, elections were not held on 31 December 2022, despite lines of voters outside polling stations. The ECP stated it would be "practically impossible" to hold the elections on such short notice and subsequently filed an intra-court appeal against the IHC’s decision. Concurrently, the PTI filed a petition in the IHC seeking contempt of court proceedings against the ECP for not holding the elections.

On 15 February 2023, the IHC sought a fresh schedule for the elections from the ECP after Parliament increased the number of UCs from 101 to 125.

On 29 July 2023, the ECP decided to convene a meeting on 2 August to decide on the date of the elections.

On 8 August2024, the ECP scheduled the elections to be held on 29 September 2024. On 20 August 2024, however, after requests from political parties, the elections were postponed to 9 October 2024.

On 29 August 2024, the President assented to a bill that increased the number of general seats and the number of reserved seats for women in each UC. As a result, on 4 September 2024, the ECP held its previously announced election schedule in abeyance.

On 9 December 2025, the ECP announced that the elections will be held on 15 February 2026.

In January 2026, the President approved an ordinance that divided the Metropolitan Corporation into three separate Town Corporations. On 16 January, the ECP recalled its previously announced election schedule.

== Timeline ==
On 21 July 2026, the ECP announced that the final list of constituencies and UCs would be published on 13 October 2026.

== Composition ==
The local government election in Islamabad Capital Territory consists of 125 Union Councils (UCs) and three Town Corporations. Each Town Corporation shall "comprise, as far as practicable, to the territorial limits of a National Assembly constituency within the Islamabad Capital Territory".

For each UC, 9 general members will be elected directly and for this election, the entire UC will be considered as a multi-member ward. Voters may only cast one vote, and the nine candidates with the highest votes will be elected. These general members will elect 4 reserved members (one woman, one youth, one peasant/worker/businessperson/technocrat, and one non-Muslim) through a show of hands. These 13 members will then elect a Chairman and Vice Chairman (as joint candidates) from amongst themselves through a show of hands. The Chairman of each UC will automatically become a general member of their respective Town Corporation.

For each Town Corporation, the general members (i.e., each UC Chairman from UCs under the boundaries of the Town Corporation) will elect, through a show of hands, 8 reserved members (4women, 1 youth, 1non-Muslim, 1 peasant/worker, and 1 trader/businessperson).These members will then elect a Mayor and two Deputy Mayors (as joint candidates) from amongst themselves through a show of hands.

== Elections ==
Pakistan Muslim League (N) (PML-N), Pakistan Tehreek-e-Insaf (PTI), and Pakistan Peoples Party (PPP) are the political parties that are most likely to compete against one another in the elections. The PPP is a strong electoral force in Islamabad and works with the PML-N in the federal government's alliance. In order to defeat the PTI, there is a likelihood that these two parties will run united candidates in numerous Union Councils.
