= Saifullah Khalid =

Saifullah Khalid may refer to:

- Saifullah Khalid Kasuri (born 1968), a Pakistani Lashkar-e-Taiba (LeT) militant and secretary general of its political front Pakistan Markazi Muslim League (PMML)
- Razaullah Nizamani (died 2025), known as Abu Saifullah Khalid, a Pakistani LeT militant and leader of PMML

== See also ==
- Khalid Saifullah Rahmani (born 1956), an Indian Muslim scholar and president of the All India Muslim Personal Law Board
