= Dhoke Khabba =

Dhoke Khabba (literally meaning "The Town on the Left") is a neighbourhood and a Union Council of Rawalpindi City located in the heart of Rawalpindi City, near Murree Road and next to Pakistan Air Force (PAF) Noor Khan Base. It has many old homes from the pre-partition era of the Indian subcontinent. The nearest main bus stop is Committee Chowk. Noorani and Chup Shah are famous mosques.

Although many college-level educational institutes are near this area, the literacy rate here remains quite low. Most of the people here manage their own small businesses, and some of them are living abroad i.e., in Australia, UK, Sweden, Germany, Dubai, and Saudi Arabia.

Dhoke Khabba has a famous Sunday market (Itwar Bazaar) near the old Kahakshan cinema. Famous adjacent areas are Dhoke Farman Ali, Dhoke Elahi Baksh, Arya Mohallah.

Dhoke Khabba is connected via Rawal Road and Murree Road. It consists of several streets. It is also known for its graveyard. It also adjoins Mukha Singh-a sub constituent of Dhoke Khabba- which includes a park.

Near Dhoke khabba is Rawalpindi Institute of Cardiology inaugurated by Mian Muhammad Shahbaz Sharif in 2010.
