= Rashid Bashir Virk =

Pakistani politician

Member-elect of the National Assembly of Pakistan
- Assuming office TBD
- Succeeding: Chaudhry Mehmood Bashir
- Constituency: NA-77 Gujranwala-I

Personal details
- Party: PMLN (2026-present)
- Parent: Chaudhry Mehmood Bashir (father)
- Occupation: Politician

Rashid Bashir Virk is a Pakistani politician from Gujranwala who is a member-elect of the National Assembly of Pakistan.

== Political career ==
Virk was elected to the National Assembly of Pakistan in a November 2026 by-election from NA-77 Gujranwala-I as a candidate of Pakistan Muslim League (N) (PML(N)). The by-election was called due to the death of Chaudhry Mehmood Bashir, his father. He received 43,365 votes and defeated Mohammad Ibrahim, a candidate of Pakistan Markazi Muslim League (PMML).
