= Mohan Pura =

Coordinates: 33.610723°N 73.049658°E

- Neighborhood
- Location within Pakistan
- Country: Pakistan
- Province: Punjab (Pakistan)
- District: Rawalpindi
- Time zone: UTC+5 (PST)

Mohan Pura is a neighborhood and a Union Council of Rawalpindi City of Rawalpindi District in the Punjab Province of Pakistan. Adjacent to the neighborhoods of Ibrahim Nagar, Nanak Pura, and Arjun NagIt's Union Council number 36 of Rawalpindi.
