= Mayor of Larkana =

- ناظم لاڑکانہ
- Larkana Municipal Corporation
- Incumbent; Vacant since 31 August 2021
- Residence: Larkana, Sindh
- Term length: Four years
- Deputy: Deputy Mayor of Larkana

Nazim-e-Larkana (Urdu: ناظم لاڑکانہ) is the Mayor who heads the Larkana Municipal Corporation (LMC) which controls the Local Government system of Larkana.

== Larkana Municipal Corporation ==
There are 20 Union Councils in larkana Municipal Corporation(LMC), the body which controls local government of Larkana. The Union Councils elect their chairmen and Vice Chairmen who then elect their Mayor and Deputy Mayor respectively.

== List of mayors ==
#	Mayor	Start term	End term	Deputy Mayor	Affiliation	Notes
1	Mohammad Bakhsh Arijo	Oct 18, 2005	2010	Qurban Abbasi	PML(Q)	District Nazim
2	Aslam Shaikh	Aug 30, 2016	Aug 31, 2020	Anwar Ali Luhar	PPP	SLGA 2013
Administrator System was implemented from September 2020 - present

== Mayor elections history ==
=== Mayor election 2015 ===
Larkana Municipal Elections 2015
#	Party	SMC	Percentage %
1	Pakistan Peoples Party	13	87%
2	Jamiat Ulema-e-Islam (F)	1	6.5%
3	Independents	1	6.5%
Total		15	100%
Votes Polled		317,251	52.6%
Total Votes		608,249	100%

The election for local govt of Larkana was held on October 31, 2015

The mayor and deputy mayor of Larkana were elected on August 24, 2016, and took oath in August 2016.

== See also ==
- Mayor of Sukkur
