= Pakistan Markazi Muslim League =

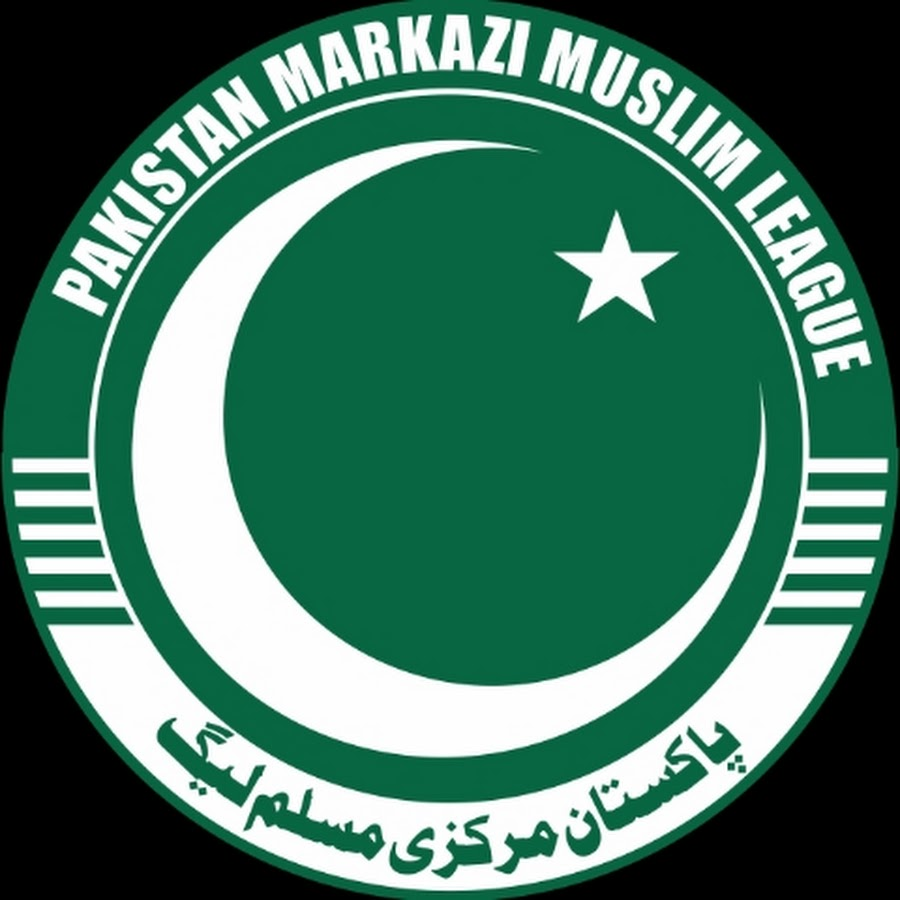
- Abbreviation: PMML
- President: Khalid Masood Sindhu
- Secretary: Saifullah Khalid Kasuri
- Founder: Hafiz Muhammad Saeed
- Founded: 7 August 2017 (9 years ago) (as Milli Muslim League); 24 May 2022 (4 years ago) (as Pakistan Markazi Muslim League)
- Student wing: Muslim Students League
- Youth wing: Muslim Youth League
- Women's wing: Muslim Women's League
- Ideology: Islamism; Islamic fundamentalism; Pakistani nationalism; Conservatism; Kashmir unification with Pakistan
- Political position: Far-right
- Religion: Islam

Party flag
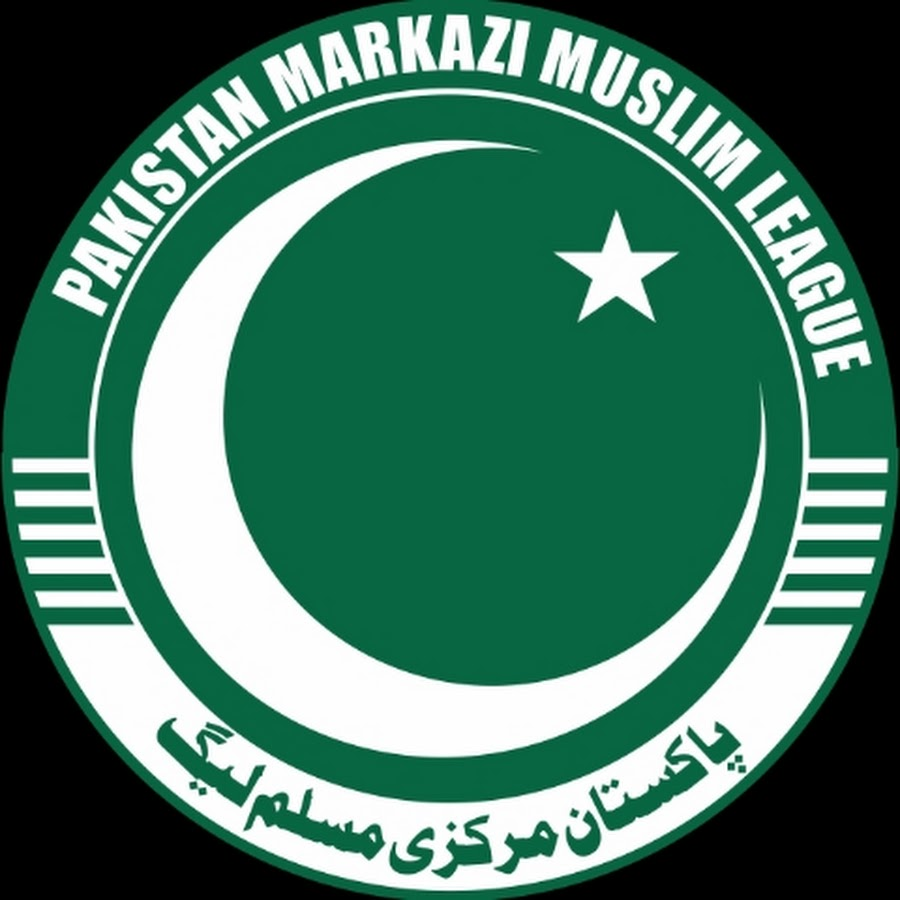

Website
- markazi.pk

The Pakistan Markazi Muslim League (PMML; lit. 'Pakistan Central Muslim League') is an Islamist political party launched by the Jamat-ud-Dawa (JuD) and its leader Hafiz Saeed. The professed aim of the party is to make Pakistan "a real Islamic and welfare state". It was founded as the Milli Muslim League (MML; lit. 'National Muslim League') in 2017. The Election Commission of Pakistan (ECP) did not recognise the party for the 2018 Pakistani general election, though most of its candidates later contested under the Allah-o-Akbar Tehreek. It re-established itself as the PMML and registered with the ECP prior to the 2024 Pakistani general election, contesting seats in all four provinces including Punjab and Sindh. The United States Department of State regards it as a front for the militant organisation Lashkar-e-Taiba (LeT). It has also stated that its secretary general Saifullah Khalid Kasuri has ties with the militant organization.

== History ==
=== Milli Muslim League ===
Milli Muslim League
- Abbreviation: MML
- President: Saifullah Khalid Kasuri
- Founder: Hafiz Muhammad Saeed
- Founded: 7 August 2017 (9 years ago)
- Newspaper: Jarrar
- Ideology: Islamism; Islamic fundamentalism Pakistani nationalism Conservatism; Kashmir unification with Pakistan
- Political position: Far-right
- Religion: Islam

Party flag
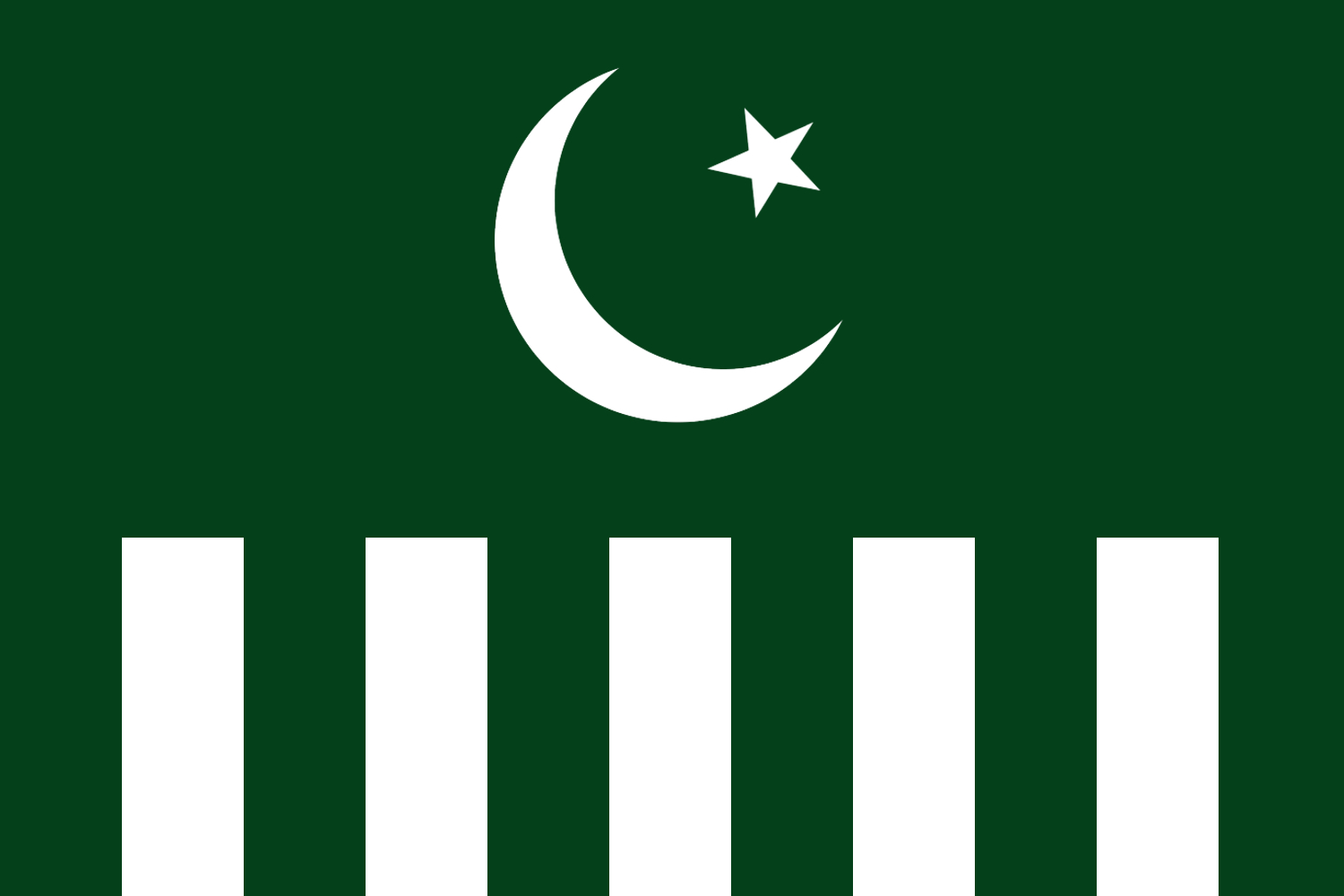

Website
- millimuslimleague.org

Jamat-ud-Dawa (JuD) members announced on 7 August 2017 the creation of the political party. MML President, Saifullah Khalid Kasuri, a Specially Designated Global Terrorist (SDGT), described the aim of the party saying, "We have decided to make a new political party, so that Pakistan is to made a real Islamic and welfare state." Tabish Qayyum, also under SDGT sanctions, acting as the party spokesman, stated they had filed registration papers for a new party with the Election Commission of Pakistan (ECP). Later in August, JuD under the banner of the MML fielded a candidate for the 2017 by-election of the NA-130 Lahore-XIV constituency. Muhammad Yaqoob Sheikh, sanctioned as an SDGT as well, filed his nomination papers as an independent candidate. Kasuri stated that they would support Sheikh and he was contesting the election as an independent as the MML was still in the process of getting registered.

The ECP in September 2017 however refused to grant recognition to the MML and warned leaders against using the party's name during election campaigns. Yaqoob Sheikh came fourth in the NA-120 by-election, securing 5,822 votes. MML announced support for an independent candidate, Alhaj Liaqat Ali Khan, running for the NA-4 by-election, on 4 October. Liaqat Ali Khan secured 3,557 votes in the election which was won by Pakistan Tehreek-e-Insaf. The registration application of the party was meanwhile rejected by ECP on 12 October.

Hafiz Saeed announced in December, a few days after his release from house arrest on 24 November, that his organization would contest the 2018 elections. Since its registration was rejected, it fielded its candidates under another party, the Allah-o-Akbar Tehreek. However, the party failed to win any seats.

=== Pakistan Markazi Muslim League ===
It re-emerged as the Pakistan Markazi Muslim League (PMML; lit. 'Pakistan Central Muslim League') on 24 May 2022, to evade the ECP ban, and registered with the ECP for the 2024 Pakistani general election. Its assigned election symbol being a chair.

==== Electoral history ====
Its candidates first submitted nomination papers for the 2022 Islamabad local government elections but the elections were postponed. 271 candidates were given party tickets for the 2023 Punjab general elections but those elections were also not held.

The PMML then nominated 507 candidates for the National Assembly and all four provincial assemblies in the 2024 Pakistani general election and received a total of more than 525,000 votes. Specially Designated Global Terrorists (linked to the Lashkar-e-Taiba, LeT) Talha Saeed (Hafiz Saeed's son and president of PMML), Hafiz Abdul Rauf, Faisal Nadeem and Muzammil Iqbal Hashmi contested from NA-127 Lahore-XI, NA-119 Lahore-III, NA-235 Karachi East-I and NA-77 Gujranwala-I respectively. Other LeT-linked designated terrorists serving as PMML party officials include Muhammad Ehsan, general secretary, and Muhammad Fayyaz, finance secretary. Its electoral campaign was targeted against the then ongoing Pakistani political crisis and Pakistani economic crisis. Large rallies were held in Karachi, Quetta, Peshawar, and Lahore. PMML's Takbeer Conference at the Minar-e-Pakistan in Lahore on May 28 was the party's biggest and was attended by thousands of people. It however failed to win from any of the seats in the 2024 elections.

==== Structure and ideology ====
This party has established an organizational structure down to the sub-level in all provinces of the country, it is headed by a central committee which oversees various province and district level committees and also has a central youth committee. During the membership drive in 2023, millions of people obtained membership forms of the organization. It has several sub-organizations/wings that operate in all sectors of Pakistani society. Muslim Women's League is its women's wing, Muslim Students League is its student wing, Muslim Youth League is its youth wing, Milli Labour Federation is its trade union, it also has a farmer's wing along with a teacher's and a farmer's department.

It presents itself as an Islamist, conservative and welfarist party, running several public and food charity programs, with beliefs in Islamic democracy, pan-Islamism, Islamic nationalism and Pakistani nationalism.

== Lashkar-e-Taiba front ==
On 2 April 2018, the U.S. Department of State designated the MML as well as the Tehreek-e-Azaadi Jammu and Kashmir as aliases of the designated terrorist organization Lashkar-e-Taiba. The department said that MML was a political front for LeT. Both aliases were included in the Foreign terrorist organisation (FTO) list under Section 219 of the Immigration and Nationality Act, and as a Specially Designated Global Terrorist (SDGT) under Executive Order 13224. Facebook removed accounts and pages of the party on 15 July.

Kasuri, the secretary general of PMML, publicly denied involvement in the 2025 Pahalgam attack after reports emerged in Indian media of him being behind the planning of the attack.

Razaullah Nizamani, aka Abu Saifullah Khalid and also known by the aliases Mohammed Salim and Vinode Kumar, who masterminded the 2005 Indian Institute of Science shooting and had led LeT’s operations from Nepal since 2000, was killed by three gunmen in Badin, Sindh on 18 May 2025. He later shifted to Pakistan, where he became a senior PMML leader and maintained coordination with other senior PMML (and LeT and JuD) leaders, including Yusuf Muzammil, Muzammil Iqbal Hashmi, and Muhammad Yusuf Taibi. In the years prior to his death, he was reportedly tasked with recruiting operatives and raising funds for LeT in Sindh’s Badin and Hyderabad districts.
