= Chaudhry Mehmood Bashir =

Pakistani politician (1937–2026)

- چوہدری محمود بشیر

Member of the National Assembly of Pakistan
- In office 29 February 2024 – 11 September 2026
- Constituency: NA-77 Gujranwala-I
- In office 13 August 2018 – 10 August 2023
- Constituency: NA-80 (Gujranwala-II)
- In office 17 March 2008 – 31 May 2018
- Constituency: NA-97 (Gujranwala-III)
- In office 16 February 1997 – 12 October 1999
- Constituency: NA-77 (Gujranwala-IV)

Federal Minister for Law and Justice
- In office 9 January 2018 – 31 May 2018
- President: Mamnoon Hussain
- Prime Minister: Shahid Khaqan Abbasi
- Preceded by: Zahid Hamid

Personal details
- Born: 25 December 1937
- Died: 11 September 2026 (aged 88) Lahore, Punjab, Pakistan
- Party: PMLN (1997–2026)
- Children: Rashid Bashir Virk (son)

Chaudhry Mahmood Bashir Virk (Urdu: چوہدری محمود بشیر ورک; 25 December 1937 – 11 September 2026) was a Pakistani politician who was a member of the National Assembly of Pakistan from 2024 to 2026 and from August 2018 to August 2023. Previously, he had been a member of the National Assembly from 1997 to 1999 and again from March 2008 to May 2018.

Bashir served as Federal Minister for Law and Justice, in the Abbasi cabinet from January 2018 to May 2018.

== Background ==
Chaudhry Mahmood Bashir Virk was born on 25 December 1937.

== Political career ==
Bashir was elected to the National Assembly of Pakistan as a candidate of Pakistan Muslim League (N) (PML-N) from Constituency NA-77 (Gujranwala-IV) in the 1997 Pakistani general election. He received 64,729 votes and defeated Muhammad Aslam Lone, a candidate of Pakistan Peoples Party (PPP).

He contested for the seat of the National Assembly as a candidate of PML-N from Constituency NA-97 (Gujranwala-III) in the 2002 Pakistani general election, but was unsuccessful. He received 12,491 votes and lost the seat to Chaudhry Shahid Akram Bhinder, a candidate of the Pakistan Muslim League (Q).

Bashir was re-elected to the National Assembly as a candidate of PML-N from Constituency NA-97 (Gujranwala-III) in the 2008 Pakistani general election. He received 48,701 votes and defeated Zafar Chaudhary, a candidate of PPP.

He was re-elected to the National Assembly as a candidate of PML-N from Constituency NA-97 (Gujranwala-III) in the 2013 Pakistani general election. He received 104,638 votes and defeated Rana Naeem Ur Rehman Khan, a candidate of Pakistan Tehreek-e-Insaf.

In January 2018, Virk was inducted into the federal cabinet of Prime Minister Shahid Khaqan Abbasi as a federal minister and was made Minister for Law and Justice. Upon the dissolution of the National Assembly on the expiration of its term on 31 May 2018, Virk ceased to hold the office as Federal Minister for Law and Justice.

Bashir was re-elected to the National Assembly as a candidate of PML-N from NA-80 (Gujranwala-II) in the 2018 Pakistani general election. He received 108,653 votes and defeated Mian Tariq Mehmood, a candidate of Pakistan Tehreek-e-Insaf (PTI).

He was re-elected to the National Assembly as a candidate of PML-N from NA-77 Gujranwala-I in the 2024 Pakistani general election. He received 109,704 votes and defeated Rashida Tariq, an independent candidate supported by PTI.

== Death ==
Bashir died on 11 September 2026, at the age of 88.
