= NA-77 Gujranwala-I =

Constituency for the National Assembly of Pakistan

- Constituency for the National Assembly of Pakistan
- Region: Qila Didar Singh and Ludhewala Towns, Gujranwala City (partly) and Cantonment of Gujranwala District
- Electorate: 518,620

Current constituency
- Member: Vacant
- Created from: NA-97 Gujranwala-III; NA-98 Gujranwala-IV

NA-77 Gujranwala-I (این اے-77، گوجرانوالہ-1) is a constituency for the National Assembly of Pakistan. It encompasses Gujranwala Cantonment and, moreover, the towns of Qila Didar Singh and Ludhewala Warraich. Additionally, it includes portions of the Gujranwala Saddar Tehsil, Gujranwala City Tehsil and the Municipality of Gujranwala.

== Members of Parliament ==
=== 2018–2023: NA-80 Gujranwala-II ===
Election	Member	Party
2018	Chaudhry Mehmood Bashir	PML (N)

=== 2024–present: NA-77 Gujranwala-I ===
Election	Member	Party
2024	Chaudhry Mehmood Bashir	PML (N)

== Election 2002 ==
General elections in Gujranwala were held on 10 October 2002. Chaudhry Shahid Akram Bhinder of PML-Q won by 29,375 votes.

General election 2002: NA-97 Gujranwala-III
Party	Candidate	Votes	%	±%
PML(Q)	Ch. Shahid Akram Bhinder	29,375	32.69	
PPP	Dr. Zafar Ch.	24,461	27.22	
MMA	Shabbir Hussain Abbasi	15,265	16.99	
PML(N)	Chaudhry Mehmood Bashir	12,491	13.90	
PAT	Ch. Muhammad Ishfaq Butter	6,153	6.85	
Others	Others (four candidates)	2,114	2.35	
Turnout		93,254	37.49	
Total valid votes		89,859	96.36	
Rejected ballots		3,395	3.64	
Majority		4,914	5.47	
Registered electors		248,771		

== Election 2008 ==
General elections were held on 18 February 2008. Chaudhry Mehmood Bashir of PML-N won by 48,701 votes.

General election 2008: NA-97 Gujranwala-III
Party	Candidate	Votes	%	±%
PML(N)	Chaudhry Mehmood Bashir	48,701	42.90	
PPP	Dr. Zafar Ch.	41,545	36.60	
PML(Q)	Ch. Shahid Akram Bhinder	21,626	19.05	
Others	Others (four candidates)	1,444	1.45	
Turnout		117,089	34.00	
Total valid votes		113,526	96.96	
Rejected ballots		3,563	3.04	
Majority		7,156	6.30	
Registered electors		344,369		
PML(N) gain from PML(Q)				

== Election 2013 ==
General elections were held on 11 May 2013. Chaudhry Mehmood Bashir of PML-N won by 104,638 votes and became a member of National Assembly.

General election 2013: NA-97 Gujranwala-III
Party	Candidate	Votes	%	±%
PML(N)	Chaudhry Mehmood Bashir	104,638	62.50	
PTI	Rana Naeem Ur Rehman Khan	31,436	18.78	
PML(Q)	Anwar Bhinder	16,128	9.63	
Others	Others (thirteen candidates)	15,229	9.09	
Turnout		171,659	52.23	
Total valid votes		167,431	97.54	
Rejected ballots		4,228	2.46	
Majority		73,202	43.72	
Registered electors		328,632		
PML(N) hold				

== Election 2018 ==
General elections were held on 25 July 2018.

General election 2018: NA-80 Gujranwala-II
Party	Candidate	Votes	%	±%
PML(N)	Chaudhry Mehmood Bashir	108,653	50.56	
PTI	Mian Tariq Mehmood	71,937	33.47	
Others	Others (fifteen candidates)	29,065	13.52	
Turnout		214,949	53.36	
Rejected ballots		5,294	2.46	
Majority		36,716	17.08	
Registered electors		402,794		
PML(N) hold		Swing	N/A	

== Election 2024 ==
General elections were held on 8 February 2024. Chaudhry Mehmood Bashir won the election with 109,704 votes.

General election 2024: NA-77 Gujranwala-I
Party	Candidate	Votes	%	±%
PML(N)	Chaudhry Mehmood Bashir	109,704	44.82	▼5.74
PTI	Rashida Tariq (Note: Filed nomination papers as PTI candidate but ECP allowed her to run as an Independent)	91,825	37.51	▲4.04
PPP	Imtiaz Safdar Warraich	17,059	6.97	▲4.62
PMML	Muzamil Iqbal Hashmi	6,538	2.67	N/A
JI	Syed Umar Farooq	5,463	2.23	N/A
Others	Others (twenty candidates)	14,199	5.80	
Turnout		252,205	52.20	▼1.16
Total valid votes		244,788	97.06	
Rejected ballots		7,417	2.94	
Majority		17,879	7.30	▼9.78
Registered electors		483,104		
PML(N) hold		Swing	N/A	

== By-election 2026 ==
A by-election was held on 8 November 2026 due to the death of Chaudhry Mehmood Bashir, the previous member from this seat. Rashid Bashir Virk, his son, won the election with 43,365 votes.

General election 2024: NA-77 Gujranwala-I
Party	Candidate	Votes	%	±%
PML(N)	Rashid Bashir Virk	43,365	54.20	▲9,38
PMML	Mohammad Ibrahim	30,218	37.76	▲35.09
PTI	Ulfat Rasool Warraich	5,373	6.71	
Others	Others (eight candidates)	1,060	1.32	
Turnout		81,151	15.65	▼36.55
Total valid votes		80,016	98.60	
Rejected ballots		1,135	1.40	
Majority		13,147	16.43	▲9.13
Registered electors		518,620		
PML(N) hold		Swing	N/A	

== See also ==
- NA-76 Narowal-II
- NA-78 Gujranwala-II
