= Mayor of Rawalpindi =

- ناظم راولپنڈی
- Rawalpindi Municipal Corporation
- Incumbent; Vacant since 31 December 2021
- Rawalpindi Municipal Corporation
- Residence: Rawalpindi
- Term length: Four years
- Deputy: Deputy Mayor of Rawalpindi
- Website: Official website

The Mayor of Rawalpindi (Urdu: ناظم راولپنڈی) is the mayor who heads the Municipal Corporation Rawalpindi (MCR), which controls the local government system of Rawalpindi, Pakistan.

== Rawalpindi local government system ==
There are 46 union councils in Municipal Corporation Rawalpindi (MCR), the body which controls local government of Rawalpindi. The union councils elect their chairmen and vice chairmen who then elect their mayor and deputy mayor respectively.

=== Multiple deputy mayors ===
The seats of Rawalpindi deputy mayors have been increased from 1 to 5.

== List of mayors of Rawalpindi ==
Following is the list of mayors in recent time.

#	Mayor	Party	Term start	Term end	Ref	Deputy Mayor
1	Raja Tariq Kiani	PPP	2001	2005		Javed Ikhlas
2	Javed Ikhlas	PML	October 2005	2009		
3	Sardar Naseem Khan	PML-N	2016	2021		Chaudhary Tariq Mehmood

== Local government elections 2015 ==
1. PMLN (74.0%)
2. IND (17.4%)
3. PTI (3.30%)
4. AML (2.20%)

Local government election held in Rawalpindi on December 5, 2015

Party	UC
Pakistan Muslim League (N)	34
Pakistan Peoples Party	4
INDEPENDENTS	4
Pakistan Tehreek-e-Insaf	2
Awami Muslim League (Pakistan)	1
awaited	1
Total	46

The mayor and Deputy Mayors of Rawalpindi have been delayed.

== See also ==
- Mayor of Islamabad
- Mayor of Lahore
- Mayor of Faisalabad
- Mayor of Karachi
- Mayor of Multan
