= Sohail Mashadi =

Mayor of Hyderabad
- In office 10 January 2019 – present
- Succeeded by: present

Pakistani Parliamentarian from PS-41 Hyderabad
- In office 4 November 1990 – resigned

Personal details
- Party: MQM

Syed Sohail Mehmood Mashadi (Urdu: سید سہیل محمود مشہدی) is the current Mayor of Hyderabad and an ex MQM parliamentarian from the Provincial Assembly of Sindh. He is Present Central Coordination Committee Member of MQM, He also served as Zonal committee member of Sindh for the MQM.

== Provincial Minister Sindh ==
Sohail Mashadi was the MPA in Sindh Assembly from MQM in 1990. and was elected from PS-41 Hyderabad. He resigned from his post. He was former provincial minister in the Assembly of Sindh from the MQM.

== Deputy Mayor of Hyderabad ==
He is elected as Deputy Mayor of Hyderabad on 24 August 2016. He took office oath on 30 August 2016. He is elected as Mayor of Hyderabad 4 February 2019.

== Detention and release ==
He was detained by Rangers on 15 May 2016. He was released later.

== See also ==
- Tayyab Hussain
- Kunwar Naveed Jamil
