= Islamabad Metropolitan Corporation =

Municipal authority of Islamabad, Pakistan

Metropolitan Corporation Islamabad بلدیہ عظمی اسلام آباد

Type
- Type: Metropolitan Corporation of Islamabad Capital Territory

History
- Founded: 2015

Leadership
- Mayor: Pir Syed Adil Gillani
- Deputy Mayor: Vacant
- Administrator: Irfan Nawaz Memon
- Director: Dr Anum Fatima

Structure
- Seats: 151
- Union Council Chairmen: 101
- Women: 33
- Peasants / Workers: 5
- Technocrats: 2
- Youth members: 5
- Non-Muslims: 5

Meeting place
- MCI Office (Old Naval Headquarters), Sector G-6, Islamabad

Website
- mci.gov.pk

The Metropolitan Corporation Islamabad (MCI; Urdu: بلدیہ عظمی اسلام آباد) is a municipal authority for the Islamabad Capital Territory, Pakistan. It was established under the ICT Local Government Act 2015. The Corporation is one of three local government bodies in the Capital Territory; the other two are the ICT Administration (ICTA) and the Capital Development Authority (CDA).

== Membership ==
The corporation is headed by the Mayor of Islamabad and includes 151 other members including 101 chairmen of the union councils (the lowest level of local government).

The MCI is responsible for various activities in the Capital Territory including waste management, environmental protections, and developmental works to name a few. According to its official website, the Mayor has outlined various initiatives to be taken for the development of the city including; construction of a town hall, provision of water supply from Ghazi Barotha dam, formation of a solid waste management company, etc.

== Services ==
Since its inception, many municipal functions have been transferred to the Corporation from the Capital Development Authority, including planning, building control, sanitation, and road maintenance. The services provided by the Corporation are organised under several directorates:

- CDA Model School
- Emergency and Disaster Management (Fire and rescue)
- Emergency services (MCI CARES 1122)
- Geology and Hydrology Laboratory
- Health services
- Sports, Culture and Tourism
- Material Quality and Water Quality Control Cell, Central Engineering Laboratory
- Municipal Administration
- Revenue

== See also ==
- Capital Development Authority (Islamabad)
- ICT Administration
- Islamabad High Court
