= Mayor of Quetta =

- Status: Dissolved
- Residence: Quetta, Balochistan, Pakistan
- Term length: 4 years
- Abolished: 27 January 2019

Mayor of Quetta (Note: Urdu: ناظم کوئٹہ; Balochi: کوئٹہ ءِ شہردار.; Pashto: د کوټې ښاروال; Dari: شهردار کویته) is the Mayor who head the Quetta Metropolitan Corporation (QMC) which controls the Local Government system of Quetta, Balochistan.

== Quetta local government system ==
Quetta Local Government System is headed by Quetta Metropolitan Corporation (QMC). District council Quetta is a separate body which governs the rural areas of Quetta. There are total 84 seats for QMC. The Balochistan Local Government act is very similar to Sindh and Punjab Local Government Act which is based on amended form of Balochistan Local Government Act 2010.

== List of mayors of Quetta ==
Following is the list of mayors of Quetta.

#	Name of Mayor	Start date	End date	Party	Deputy Mayor	Party	Notes
1	Mir Maqbool Lehri (1st Term)						
2	Mohammad Rahim Kakar	2001	2005	PMLQ	Wale Mohammad Lehri	PMLQ	non-partisan, City District Govt Quetta
3	Mir Maqbool Lehri (2nd Term)	October 7, 2005	2009	PMLQ		PMLQ	non-partisan, defeat PMLQ official candidate
Administrator system implemented 2009-2015
4	Dr. Kaleem Ullah Kakar	29 January 2015	January 27, 2020	PKMAP	Younus Baloch	PML(N)	First party based elections, Watan Dost Alliance
Dissolved on January 27, 2019

=== City district government Quetta ===
Pervez Musharraf created city district Government Quetta which functioned 2001 - 2009. The city was divided into two towns which had their respective mayors, Zargoon Town and Chiltan Town.

== Mayor election history ==
=== Mayor elections 2013 ===
Quetta Local Government Elections 2013
#	Party	QMC	Percentage
1	Pakhtunkhwa Milli Awami Party	18	31%
2	Pakistan Muslim League (N)	5	8.6%
3	Pakistan Tehreek-e-Insaf	3	5.2%
4	Balochistan National Party	3	5.2%
5	Hazara Democratic Party	3	5.2%
6	Jamiat Ulema-e-Islam (F)	1	1.7%
7	Jamiat Ulama-e-Islam Nazryati	1	1.7%
8	Independents	21	36.2%
-	Results awaited	5	8.6%
Total		55	100%
