= Mayor of Multan =

- ناظم ملتان
- Municipal Corporation Multan
- Incumbent; Sheikh Abdul Wahab since 26 March 2024
- Residence: Multan
- Term length: Four years
- Deputy: Sheikh Umer Wahab
- Website: Official website

Nazim-e-Ala Multan (Urdu: ناظم ملتان) is the mayor who heads the Municipal Corporation Multan (MCM) which controls the Local Government system of Multan, Pakistan.

== Multan local government system ==
There are 68 Union Councils in Municipal Corporation Multan (MCM), the body which controls local government of Multan.The Union Councils elect their Chairmen and Vice Chairmen who then elect their Mayor and Deputy Mayor respectively.

== List of mayors ==
Following is the list of mayors of Multan in recent time

#	Mayor	Starting term	Ending term	Deputy Mayor	Affiliation	Notes
1	Yousuf Raza Gilani	1983	1985		Independent	
2	Salahuddin Dogar	1987	1991		PPP	
3	Sheikh Tariq Rashid	1998	2001		PMLN	
4	Shah Mahmood Qureshi	2001	2002		PPP	
5	Pir Riaz Hussain Qureshi	2002	2005		PMLQ	City District Government Multan
6	Mian Faisal Mukhtiar	2005	2010		PMLQ	
Commissioner System was implemented during 2010 - 2016
7	Chaudhry Naveed ul Haq Arain	2016	2021	(1) Munawar Ehsan Qureshi (2)Saeed Ansari	PMLN	Punjab Local Govt Act 2013 (PLGA)
Administrator System implemented from January 2022 - present

== Local government elections 2015 ==
1. PMLN (55.9%)
2. IND (22.0%)
3. PTI (20.6%)
4. PPP (1.50%)

Local government election held in Multan on December 5, 2015

Party	UC
Pakistan Muslim League (N)	78
INDEPENDENTS	60
Pakistan Tehreek-e-Insaf	30
Pakistan Peoples Party	12
Total	185

The mayor and deputy mayors of Multan have been delayed.

== See also ==
- Mayor of Faisalabad
- Mayor of Lahore
- Mayor of Rawalpindi
