= Mayor of Mirpurkhas =

- ميئر میرپورخاص
- Mirpurkhas Municipal Corporation
- Incumbent; Abdul Rauf Ghori (PPP) since June 2023
- Abbreviation: Mayor of Mirpurkhas (Father of City)
- Appointer: Electorate of Mirpurkhas
- Term length: 4 years
- Constituting instrument: Sindh People's Local Govt Act 2013
- Precursor: District Nazim Mirpurkhas
- Formation: 2022

The Mayor of Mirpurkhas (Urdu: ميئر میرپورخاص ) who heads the local government of Mirpurkhas, the sixth largest city of Sindh, Pakistan. Previously, the authority had resided with the district's Nazim.

== Local government ==
While Pervez Musharraf was the President of Pakistan, Mirpurkhas was administrated by the local Nazim of the district government.

The position was dissolved in 2010, after the PPP came to power.

The Nazim was reinstated in 2016 after local government order (SPLGO 2013) came into effect. This order designated that the urban city areas of Mirpurkhas would be governed by the chairman of the municipal committee, while the rural areas would be governed by a district council and various town committees.

In 2022, Sindh Local Government create Mirpurkhas Municipal Corporation and upgrade the set of Nazim to Mayor of Mirpurkhas.

== Mayors ==
The following list is of Mirpurkhas local government chairmen in recent years.

List of Mayors
#	Mayor	start term	End term	Deputy	Party affiliation	Notes
1	Pir Shafqat Hussain Shah Jilani	2001	2005		PPP	District Nazim
2	Dr Kaniz Sughra Junejo	2005	2010	Dr Zafar Kamali	PMLQ/MQM	District Nazim
3	Farooq Jamil Durrani	31 Aug 2016	2019	Fareed Ahmed Khan	MQM	Chairman Municipal Committee
4	Engineer Kamran Shiekh	July 2019	Aug 2020	Fareed Ahmed Khan	MQM	Chairman Municipal Committee
Post of Nazim Upgraded to Mayor
1	Abdul Rauf Ghori	June 2023	PPP	Mayor Municipal Corporation		

== Election Results 2022 ==
1. PPP (87.2%)
2. MQM (13.8%)

The following are the results of the elections which were conducted in May 2022.

#	Parties	seats
1	PPP	27
2	MQM	4
Total		31

== Election Results 2015 ==
1. MQM (68.0%)
2. PPP (21.3%)
3. IND (10.7%)

The following are the results of the elections which were conducted on 19 November 2015.

#	Parties	seats
1	MQM	32
2	PPP	10
3	IND	5
Total		47
