= Quetta =

Capital of Balochistan, Pakistan

Quetta: کوټه; کویٹہ; کوئٹہ
- Metropolis
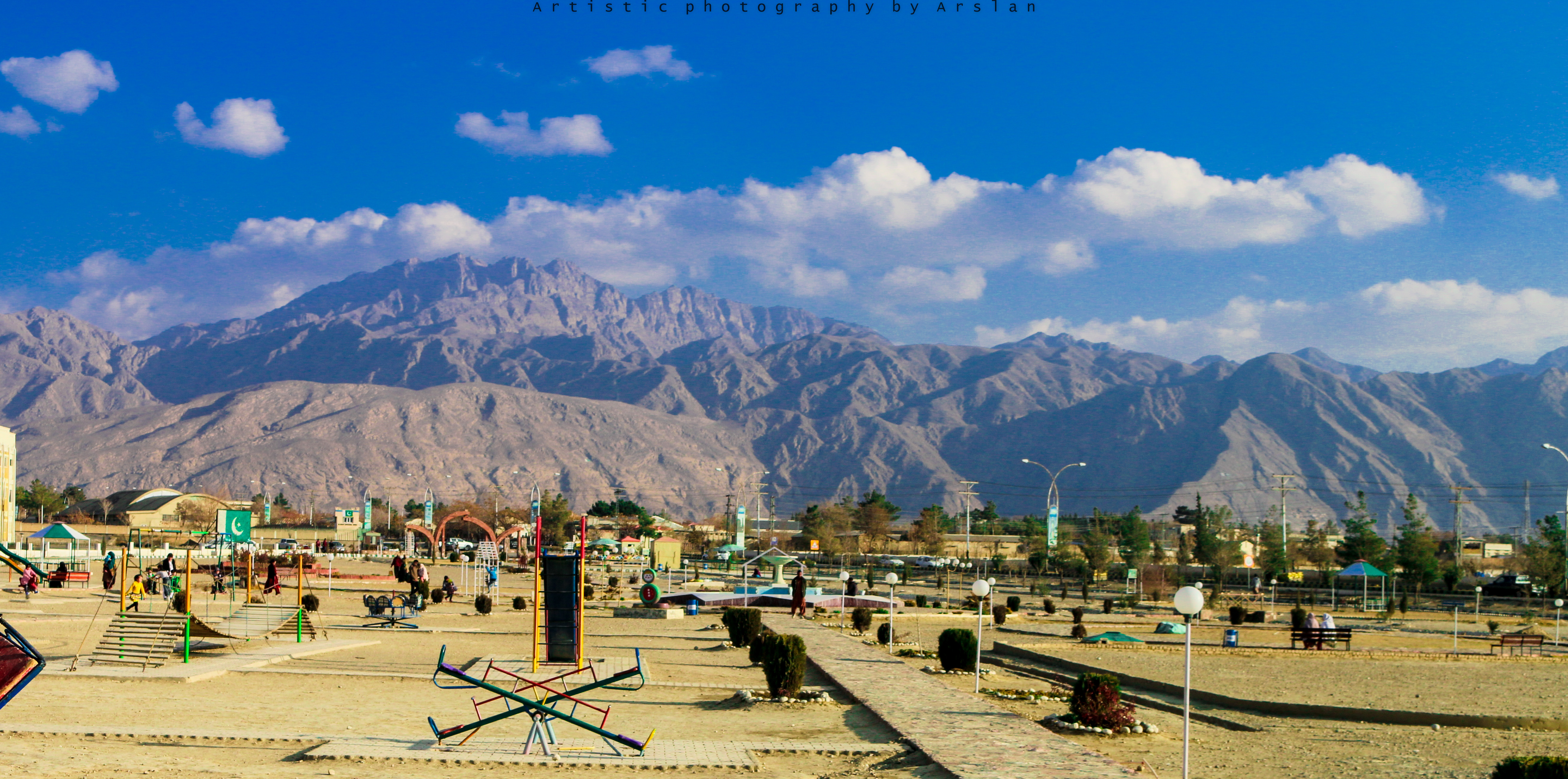
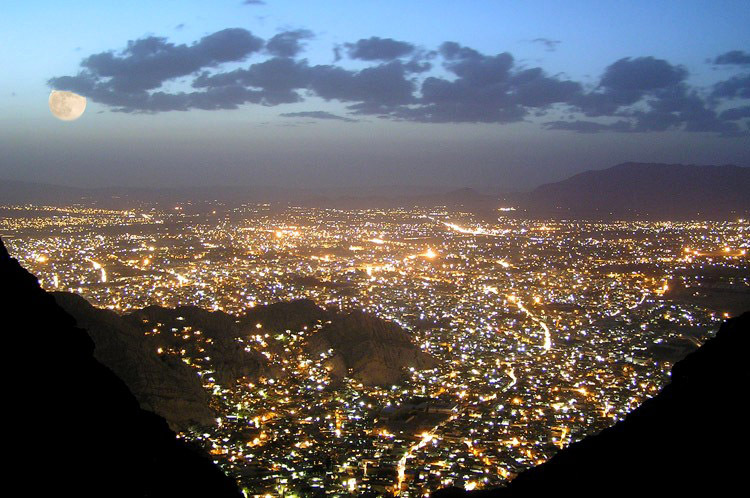
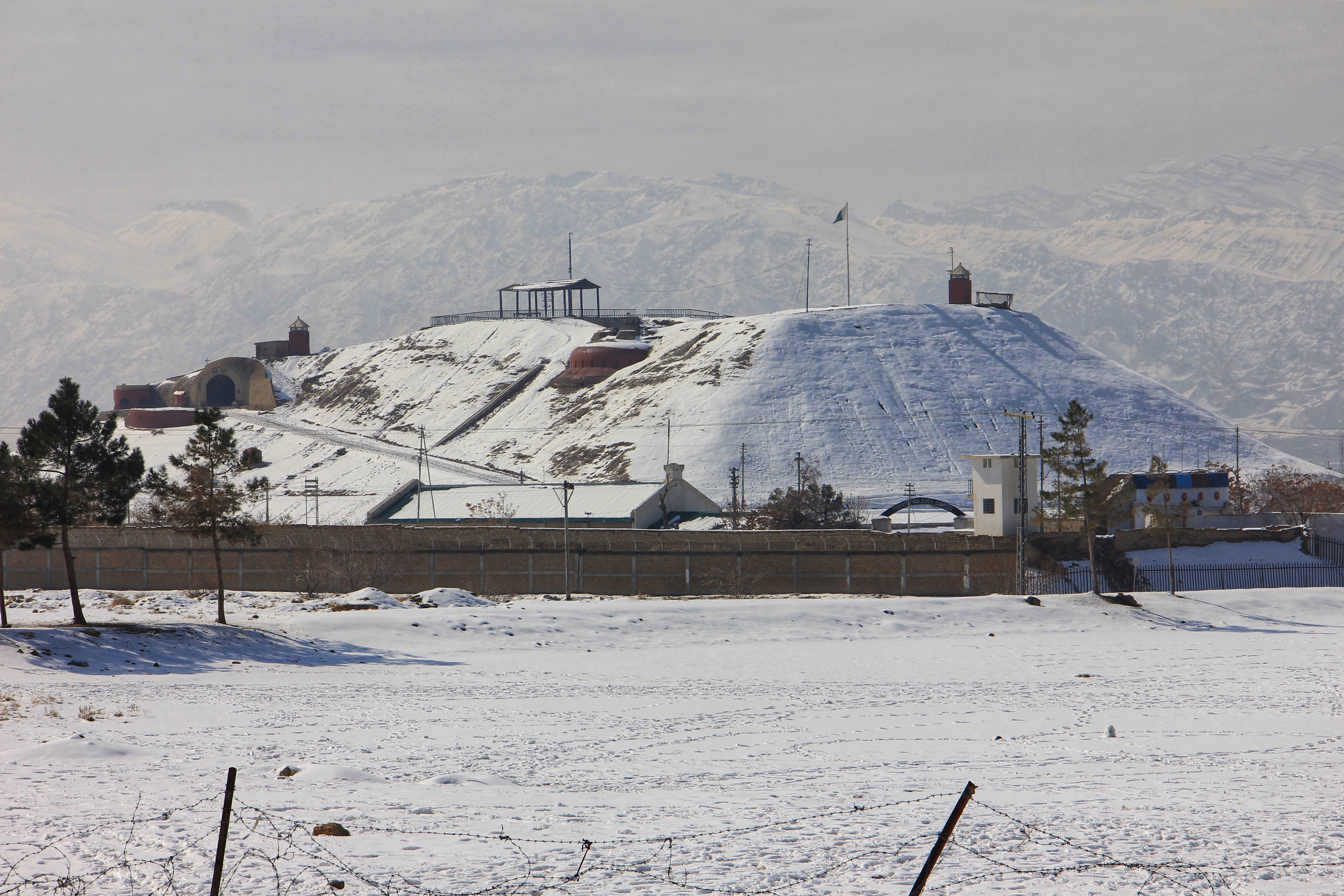
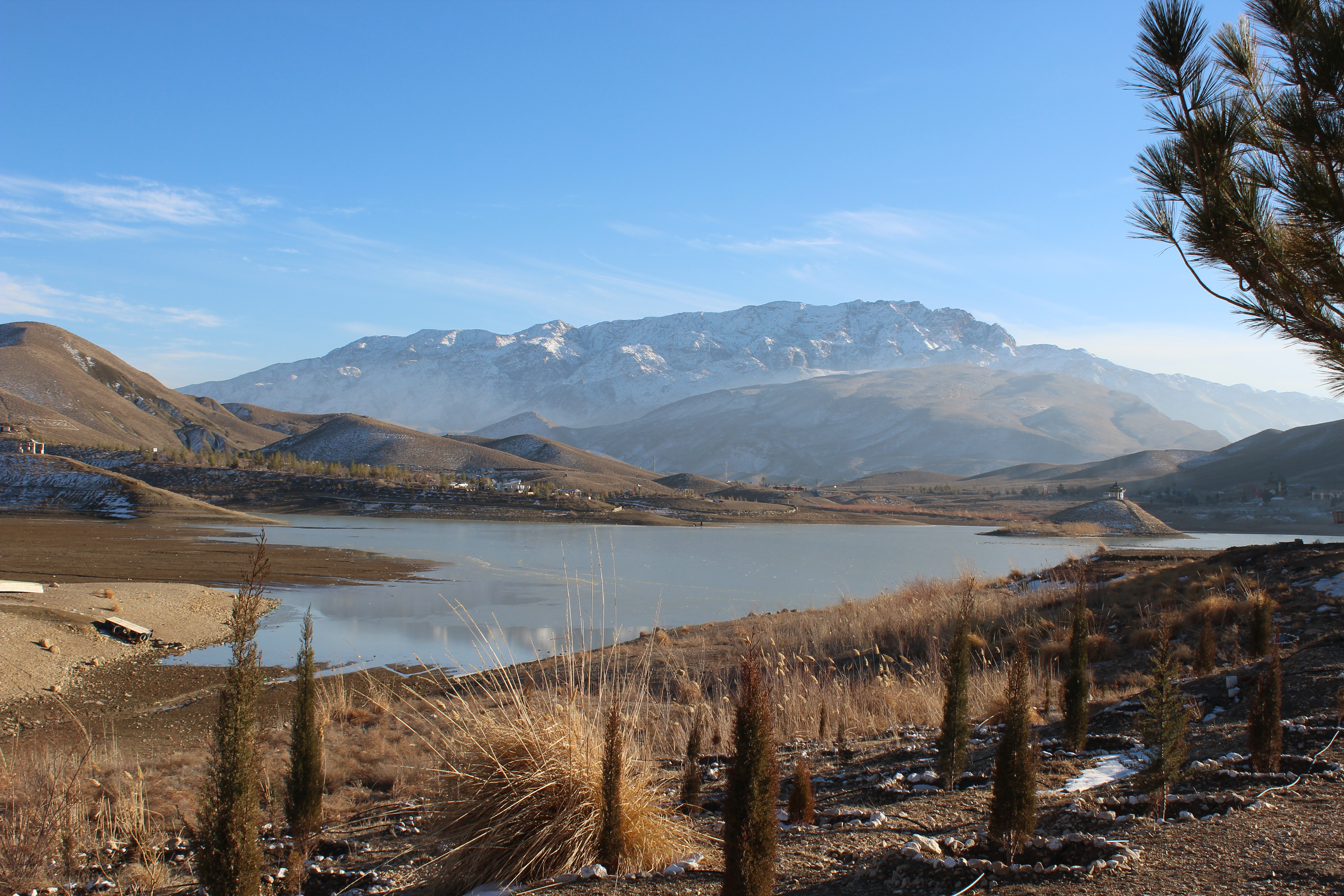
- Quetta Cantonment Quetta at night Fort Mirri Hanna Lake

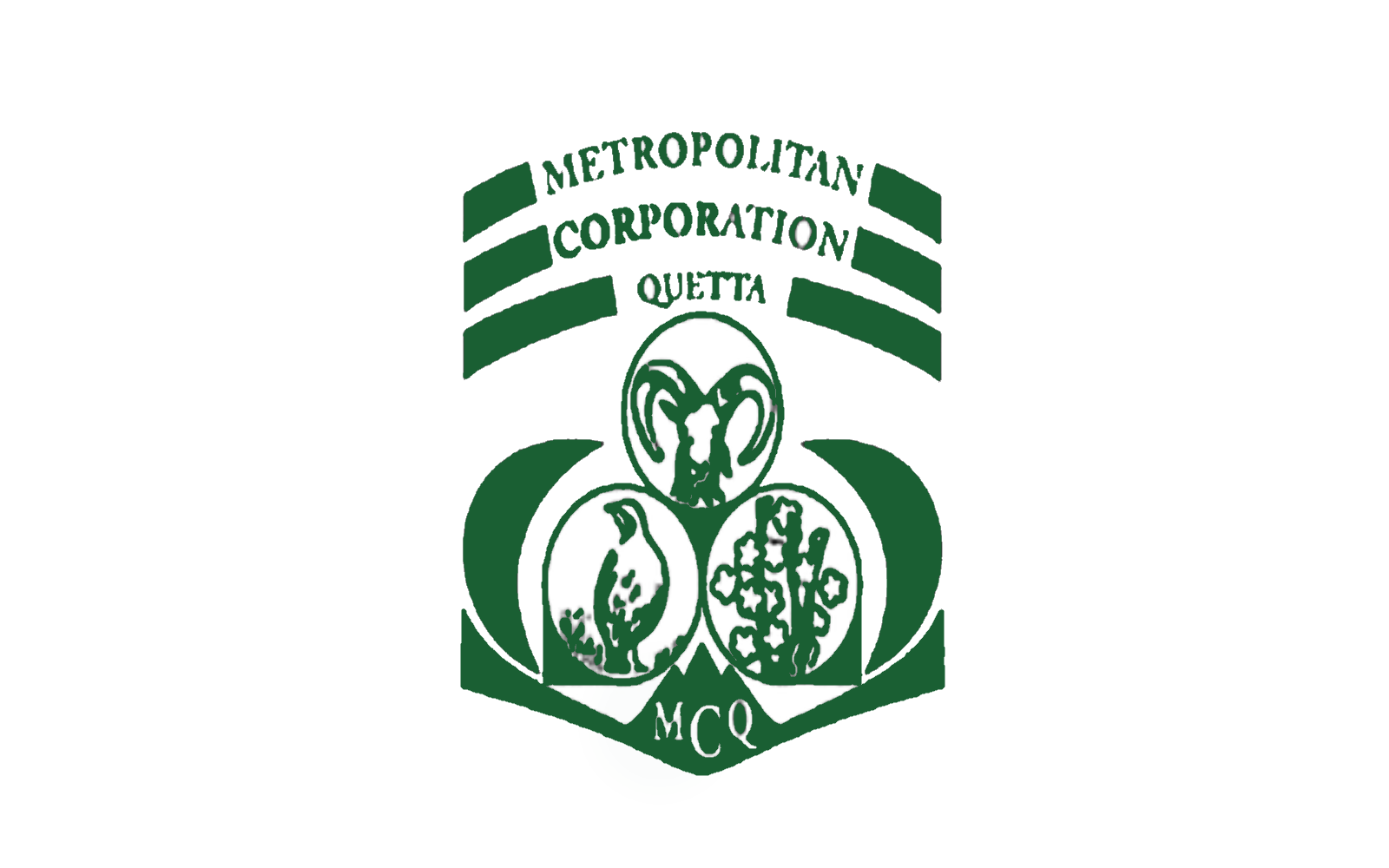
- Flag Emblem
- Nickname: Fruit Garden of Pakistan
- Location within Balochistan, Pakistan Location within Pakistan
- Coordinates: 30°11′45″N 67°01′02″E
- Country: Pakistan
- Province: (Balochistan, Pakistan) Balochistan
- Division: Quetta
- District: Quetta
- Settled: 1876; 150 years ago

Government
  - Type: Municipal Corporation
  - Mayor: Seat Vacant
  - Deputy Mayor: Seat Vacant
  - Commissioner: Shahzaib Khan Kakar
  - Deputy Commissioner: Mehrullah Badini

Area
  - City: 3,501 km^{2} (1,352 sq mi)
  - Metro: 3,501 km^{2} (1,352 sq mi)
- Elevation: 1,680 m (5,510 ft)

Population (2023)
  - City: 1,565,546
  - Rank: 9th in Pakistan; 1st in Balochistan
  - Density: 447.2/km^{2} (1,158/sq mi)
  - Demonym: Quettan or Quettawal (kʰwətə.wal)
- Time zone: UTC+05:00 (PKT)
- Postal code: 87300
- Dialling code: 081
- Highways: N-25; N-65; N-40; N-50
- Website: www.balochistan.gov.pk

Quetta (Note: /ˈkwɛtə/; Urdu: کوئٹہ, ko'eṭa, [ˈkweːʈə]; Pashto: کوټه, Pashto pronunciation: [ˈkweːʈa]; Balochi: کویٹہ) is the capital and largest city of the Pakistani province of Balochistan. It is the ninth largest city in Pakistan with an estimated population of over 1.7 million in 2024. It is situated in the south-west of the country, lying in the Quetta Valley region surrounded by mountains on all sides. Quetta is at an average elevation of 1,680 metres (5,510 feet) above sea level, making it Pakistan's highest-altitude major city.

The city is sometimes referred to as the "Fruit Garden of Pakistan" because of its numerous fruit orchards and the variety of fresh and dried fruits produced in the region. Like Karachi, Quetta is considered a "melting pot" as it is one of the most ethnically diverse cities in Pakistan.

Located in northern Balochistan near the Pakistan-Afghanistan border and the road across to Kandahar, Quetta is a trade and communication centre between the two countries. The city is near the Bolan Pass, which was on a major gateway from Central Asia to South Asia.

== Etymology ==
The name Quetta is a variation of the Pashto word Kwatkōṭ, or kōta meaning "fortress". Quetta was formerly known as Shalkot (Pashto: ښالکوټ, Urdu: شالکوٹ).

== History ==
=== Early history and etymology ===
The name Quetta is derived from the Pashto word کوټه (kwatta), meaning "fort", a reference to the naturally defensible character of the valley and to the historic mud-walled citadel known as the Miri Fort, which dominated the early settlement.

The earliest recorded historical reference to the region dates to the 11th century, when the Quetta valley was captured by Mahmud of Ghazni during his campaigns in eastern Afghanistan and the north-western Indian subcontinent.

In 1543, the Mughal emperor Humayun passed through the Quetta region while fleeing to Safavid Iran following his defeat by Sher Shah Suri.

=== Pashtun tribal settlement and landholding ===
Historically, the Quetta valley traditionally known as Shal formed part of the ancestral territory of Pashtun tribes, most prominently the Kasi (or Kansi), a Sarbani Pashtun group established as the principal cultivators and proprietary landholders of the valley. It formed part of the broader Pashtun cultural and tribal sphere linking southern Afghanistan with northern Balochistan prior to its expansion under British colonial rule.

According to the Gazetteer of the Quetta–Pishin District, the Kasi were recognised as the original owners of the Shal valley, holding agricultural land, grazing grounds, and irrigation systems (karez) under customary tribal tenure regulated by local practice and Islamic law.

A formal sanad issued by Nasir Khan I of Kalat in the mid-18th century confirmed the proprietary rights of the Kasi chiefs (arbabs) over the Shal valley, defining its boundaries and affirming their control over land and water resources. Certain Kasi families held hereditary and revenue-free grants, which continued to be recognised under later administrations.

By the early modern period, other Pashtun tribes—including the Achakzai, Kakar and Tareen—occupied surrounding uplands and valleys, while the Shal valley itself remained primarily under Kasi ownership and cultivation.

=== Afghan and Durrani period ===
In 1709, the Quetta region came under the authority of the Afghan Hotak dynasty. Following the establishment of the Durrani Empire in 1747, Ahmad Shah Durrani incorporated Quetta into the Afghan state. Administrative authority and revenue rights were later granted to Nasir Khan I of Kalat in recognition of Baloch military assistance during Durrani campaigns; however, indigenous Pashtun landholding structures—particularly those of the Kasi—remained intact.

Large tracts of land later classified under British administration as Timur Shahi lands were originally acquired by Afghan rulers through confiscation following disputes over revenue assessments. These lands were reassessed during colonial settlement operations.

=== British era ===
The first recorded European visitor to Quetta was the British traveller Charles Masson, who described the settlement in 1828 as a "mud-walled fort surrounded by three hundred mud houses."

During the Second Anglo-Afghan War, British forces occupied Quetta, and in 1883 formal control was established through a lease arrangement with the Khan of Kalat. The British subsequently expanded Quetta as a cantonment and civil station, acquiring land largely through purchase for military and administrative purposes.

Colonial settlement records indicate that indigenous Pashtun tribes—particularly the Kasi and Achakzai—remained the principal proprietors of agricultural land and irrigation systems in and around Quetta. Transfers of agricultural land occurred overwhelmingly between local cultivators, while sales to non-agriculturists were legally restricted and generally confined to small urban plots.

Detailed records further note that Achakzai and Kasi families retained hereditary and, in some cases, revenue-free shares in karez lands, with tribal leaders formally recognised as head proprietors by the colonial administration.

=== Modern period ===
Rapid urban growth in the late 19th and early 20th centuries led to a sharp rise in land values and increased litigation over immovable property, particularly within the town and cantonment areas. Contemporary records indicate that most such disputes involved recent settlers, traders, and government employees rather than indigenous landholding tribes.

Quetta was almost entirely destroyed by the 1935 Quetta earthquake, resulting in widespread devastation and loss of life. The city was subsequently rebuilt under British administration. Following the creation of Pakistan in 1947, Quetta became the provincial capital of Balochistan.

=== Pashtun tribal rule and Durrani Empire ===
Historically, the Quetta valley (traditionally known as Shal) was the ancestral domain of the Kasi (or Kansi) tribe, a branch of the Sarbani Pashtun confederation.

In 1709, the region became part of the Afghan Hotak dynasty. By 1747, Ahmad Shah Durrani incorporated it into the Durrani Empire. Durrani later granted the administration and revenue of Quetta to Nasir Khan I, the Khan of Kalat, in recognition of Baloch military assistance during the Durrani campaigns in India, though the region maintained its predominantly Pashtun tribal character.

=== British era and modern period ===
The first European to visit Quetta, British explorer Charles Masson, described it in 1828 as a "mud-walled fort surrounded by three hundred mud houses."

During the Second Anglo-Afghan War, the British occupied the city, formalising their control via a lease agreement with the Khan of Kalat in 1883. Despite the influx of colonial administrators, British census records from 1901 confirm that the Kasi Pashtuns remained the principal indigenous landholders of the district.

=== British occupation and cantonment development ===
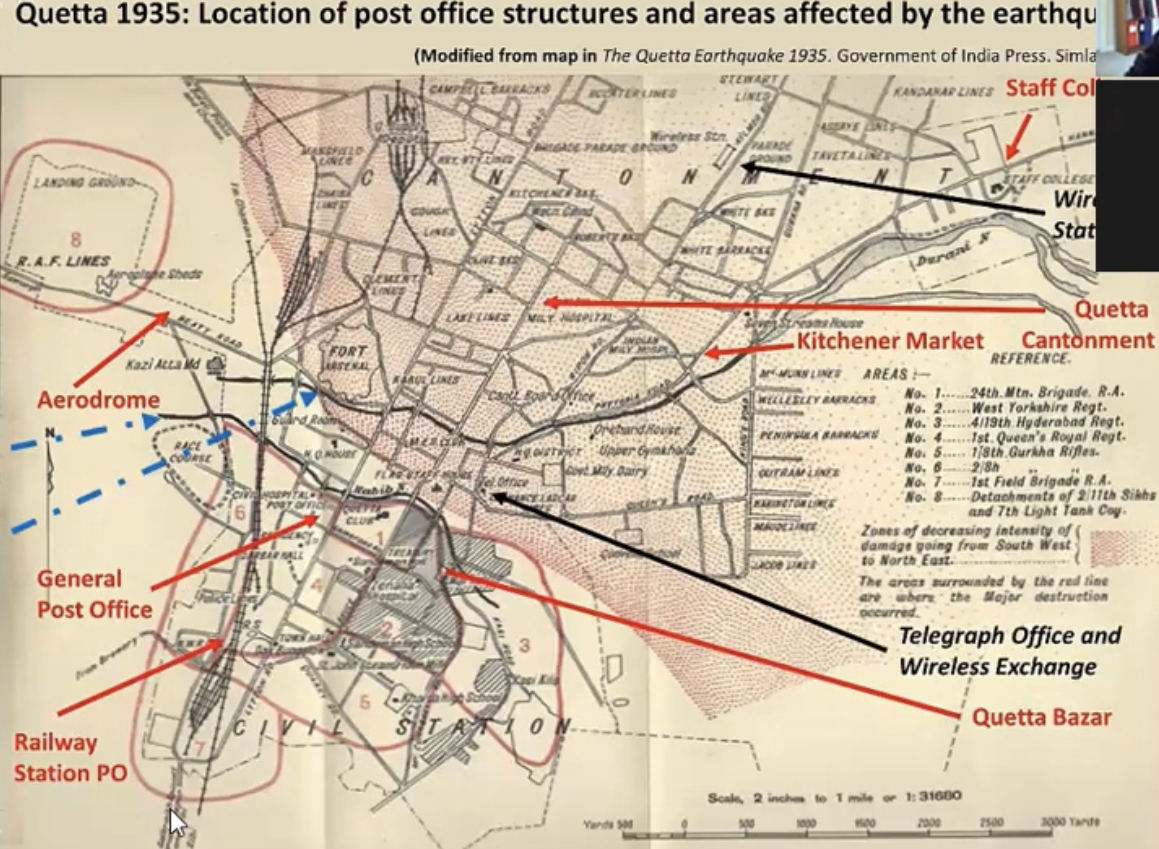
Map of Quetta before the 1935 Quetta earthquake

Although Quetta had long existed as an indigenous Pashtun settlement in the Shal valley, its transformation into a modern urban centre occurred during the British period. Owing to its strategic position on the north-western frontier and its proximity to routes leading towards Afghanistan, British officials identified Quetta as a key military and administrative site in the mid-19th century.

In 1856, General John Jacob urged the British government to occupy Quetta for frontier defence purposes. During the Second Anglo-Afghan War, British forces took military control of the area, and in 1883 a formal lease arrangement was concluded with the Khan of Kalat, bringing Quetta under effective British administration.

Under British rule, Quetta was developed as a cantonment and civil station. Land required for military, railway, and administrative purposes was largely acquired through purchase from local proprietors rather than wholesale confiscation. Colonial settlement records indicate that indigenous Pashtun tribes—particularly the Kasi and Achakzai—retained ownership of most agricultural land and irrigation systems surrounding the town, while urban expansion was concentrated within the cantonment and civil areas.

The establishment of British administration marked the beginning of sustained urban growth, with new infrastructure, roads, and public buildings constructed to serve both military and civilian needs. Quetta subsequently emerged as the principal administrative centre of northern Balochistan during the late colonial period.

=== 20th century and modern period ===
Quetta was almost completely destroyed by the 1935 Quetta earthquake, one of the deadliest earthquakes in South Asian history, which resulted in extensive loss of life and the destruction of much of the built environment. The city was subsequently rebuilt under British supervision with revised town planning and building regulations.

Following the creation of Pakistan in 1947, Quetta became the provincial capital of Balochistan, a role it continues to serve in the contemporary period.

== Climate ==
Quetta has a cold semi-arid climate (Köppen BSk) with a significant variation between summer and winter temperatures.Summer typically begins in late May and lasts until early September, with average temperatures ranging from 24 to 26 °C (75 to 79 °F). The highest temperature recorded in Quetta is 42 °C (108 °F), which occurred on 10 July 1998. Autumn starts in mid-September and continues until mid-November with average temperatures in the 12–18 °C (54–64 °F) range. Winter starts in late November and ends in late February with average temperatures near 4–5 °C (39–41 °F). The lowest temperature in Quetta is −18.3 °C (−0.9 °F) which was recorded on 8 January 1970. Spring starts in early March and ends in mid-May with average temperatures close to 15 °C (59 °F). Unlike more easterly parts of Pakistan, Quetta does not have a monsoon season of heavy rainfall. Highest rainfall during 24 hours in Quetta is 113 millimetres (4.4 in) which was recorded on 17 December 2000, Highest monthly rainfall of 232.4 millimetres (9.15 in) was recorded in March 1982 which was also the year of the highest annual rainfall, 949.8 millimetres (37.39 in). In the winter, snowfall has become quite erratic (December, January and February).

Climate data for Quetta (1991–2020 normals)
Month	Jan	Feb	Mar	Apr	May	Jun	Jul	Aug	Sep	Oct	Nov	Dec	Year
Record high °C (°F)	23.6 (74.5)	26.7 (80.1)	31.5 (88.7)	35.4 (95.7)	39.4 (102.9)	41.5 (106.7)	42.0 (107.6)	40.6 (105.1)	38.3 (100.9)	34.0 (93.2)	36.0 (96.8)	25.0 (77.0)	42.0 (107.6)
Mean daily maximum °C (°F)	11.8 (53.2)	14.0 (57.2)	19.5 (67.1)	25.9 (78.6)	31.4 (88.5)	35.5 (95.9)	36.8 (98.2)	35.4 (95.7)	31.9 (89.4)	26.0 (78.8)	19.6 (67.3)	14.6 (58.3)	25.2 (77.4)
Daily mean °C (°F)	4.8 (40.6)	7.1 (44.8)	12.5 (54.5)	17.9 (64.2)	23.0 (73.4)	27.3 (81.1)	29.2 (84.6)	27.5 (81.5)	22.8 (73.0)	16.5 (61.7)	11.0 (51.8)	6.5 (43.7)	17.2 (62.9)
Mean daily minimum °C (°F)	−1.9 (28.6)	0.3 (32.5)	5.1 (41.2)	10.0 (50.0)	14.6 (58.3)	19.0 (66.2)	21.6 (70.9)	19.7 (67.5)	13.6 (56.5)	7.0 (44.6)	1.9 (35.4)	−1.4 (29.5)	9.1 (48.4)
Record low °C (°F)	−18.3 (−0.9)	−16.7 (1.9)	−8.3 (17.1)	−3.9 (25.0)	−0.3 (31.5)	5.0 (41.0)	8.9 (48.0)	3.3 (37.9)	−0.6 (30.9)	−8.3 (17.1)	−13.3 (8.1)	−18.3 (−0.9)	−18.3 (−0.9)
Average precipitation mm (inches)	55.0 (2.17)	58.4 (2.30)	49.5 (1.95)	40.0 (1.57)	17.8 (0.70)	3.2 (0.13)	8.8 (0.35)	4.9 (0.19)	4.2 (0.17)	4.5 (0.18)	19.3 (0.76)	34.6 (1.36)	300.2 (11.83)
Average snowfall cm (inches)	22 (8.7)	17 (6.6)	3.0 (1.2)	0 (0)	0 (0)	0 (0)	0 (0)	0 (0)	0 (0)	0 (0)	0.51 (0.2)	14 (5.4)	56.51 (22.1)
Average precipitation days (≥ 1.0 mm)	5.0	5.7	5.4	4.1	1.7	0.7	0.8	0.8	0.4	0.6	1.7	2.7	29.6
Average relative humidity (%)	63	59	54	50	43	36	43	42	39	40	47	56	48
Mean monthly sunshine hours	220.1	209.0	232.5	273.0	334.8	327.0	313.1	313.1	294.0	306.9	279.0	238.7	3,341.2
Mean daily sunshine hours	7.1	7.4	7.5	9.1	10.8	10.9	10.1	10.1	9.8	9.9	9.3	7.7	9.1
Source 1: NOAA, Hong Kong Observatory (altitude: 1589 m) (only snow inch, sun)
Source 2: PMD, Deutscher Wetterdienst (humidity 1951-1967)

The city saw a severe drought from 1999 to 2001 during which the city did not receive snowfall and below normal rains. In 2002, the city received snow after a gap of five years. In 2004 and 2005, the city received normal rains after three years without snowfall while in 2006, 2007 and 2009 the city received no snow. In 2008, it received a snowfall of 10 centimetres (4 in) in four hours on 29 January, followed on 2 February by 25.4 centimetres (10 in) in 10 hours – the city's heaviest snowfall in a decade. During the winter of 2010, it received no snow and saw below normal rains due to the presence of El-Nino over Pakistan.

== Demographics ==
Historical population

Year	Pop.	±%
1941	65,000	—
1951	84,000	+29.2%
1961	107,000	+27.4%
1972	158,000	+47.7%

Year	Pop.	±%
1981	286,000	+81.0%
1998	565,137	+97.6%
2017	1,001,205	+77.2%
2023	1,565,546	+56.4%

According to the 2023 census of Pakistan, the population of the city was a total of 1,565,546. This makes it the largest city in Balochistan province and one of the major cities of Pakistan. Quetta is one of the most ethnically diverse cities in the country. The city has a Pashtun plurality followed by Balochs, Hazaras, Brahvis, Sindhis, Saraikis, Punjabis and Muhajirs. Urdu, being the national language, is used and understood by all the residents and serves as a lingua franca.

Languages

Languages of Urban Quetta (2023)
1. Pashto (62.9%)
2. Brahvi (10.3%)
3. Balochi (7.29%)
4. Punjabi (4.73%)
5. Urdu (3.88%)
6. Sindhi (1.57%)
7. Saraiki (1.35%)
8. Hindko (1.44%)
9. Others (6.54%)

According to Reuters and the BBC, there are as many as 500,000–600,000 Hazaras living in Quetta and its surrounding areas.

Religious groups in Quetta City (1891–2023) (Note: 1891–1941: Data for the entirety of the town of Quetta, which included Quetta Municipality and Quetta Cantonment. 2017 & 2023: Urban population of Quetta District.)
Religious group	1891		1941		2017		2023	
Religious group	Pop.	%	Pop.	%	Pop.	%	Pop.	%
Islam	6,281	37.02%	27,935	43.33%	975,815	97.64%	1,264,791	97.9%
Christianity	2,650	15.62%	5,024	7.79%	16,842	1.69%	20,897	1.62%
Hinduism	7,180	42.32%	24,010	37.24%	6,112	0.61%	5,366	0.42%
Sikhism	807	4.76%	7,364	11.42%	—N/a	—N/a	123	0.01%
Zoroastrianism	31	0.18%	73	0.11%	—N/a	—N/a	46	0%
Judaism	16	0.09%	11	0.02%	—N/a	—N/a	—N/a	—N/a
Buddhism	0	0%	42	0.07%	—N/a	—N/a	—N/a	—N/a
Jainism	0	0%	6	0.01%	—N/a	—N/a	—N/a	—N/a
Tribal	0	0%	0	0%	—N/a	—N/a	—N/a	—N/a
Ahmadiyya	—N/a	—N/a	—N/a	—N/a	363	0.04%	127	0.01%
Others	2	0.01%	11	0.02%	253	0.03%	506	0.04%
Total population	16,967	100%	64,476	100%	999,385	100%	1,291,856	100%

== Administration ==
At the local level, the city is governed by a municipal corporation consisting of 66 ward members which elects a mayor and a deputy mayor. In addition, Quetta Development Authority is responsible for provision of municipal services for the city.

== Transportation ==
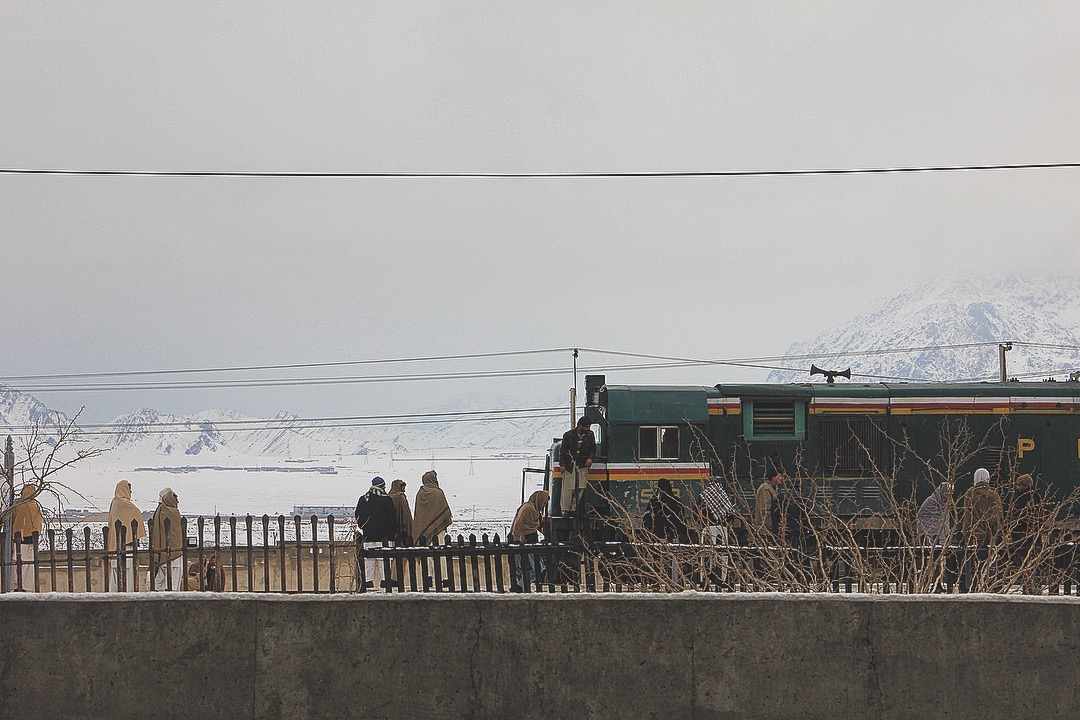
Passengers boarding a Chaman bound train at Baleli, Quetta

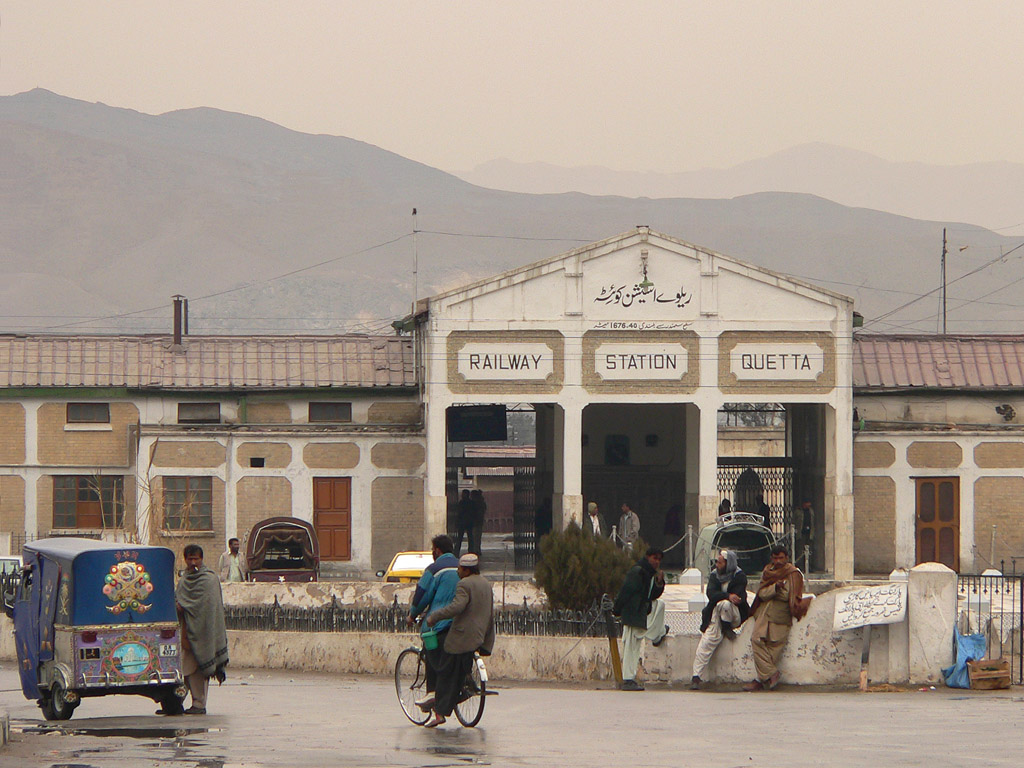
Quetta railway station was built during the British Raj

Quetta is on the western side of Pakistan and is connected to the rest of the country by a network of roads, railways and its international airport close to its centre.

At an altitude of 1,605 metres (5,266 feet) above sea level, Quetta International Airport is the second-highest airport in Pakistan. Pakistan International Airlines has regular flights to and from the other major cities of Pakistan including Islamabad, Gwadar, Karachi, Lahore and Peshawar.

Quetta Railway Station is one of the highest railway stations in Pakistan at 1,676 metres (5,499 feet) above sea level. The railway track was laid in the 1890s during the British era to link Quetta with rest of the country. The extensive network of Pakistan Railways connects Quetta to Karachi in the south, by a 863 km (536 mi) track, Lahore in the northeast (1,170 km or 727 miles) and Peshawar further northeast (1,587 km or 986 miles). A metalled road runs alongside the railway that connects Quetta to Karachi via the nearby town of Sibi to Jacobabad and Rohri in the plain of the River Indus.

== Education ==
Quetta serves as the learning centre for the Balochistan province. The city has a number of government and private colleges, including the following:

- Balochistan Agriculture College
- Balochistan University of Information Technology, Engineering and Management Sciences (BUITEMS)
- Bolan Medical College
- Islamia High School, Quetta; frequently visited by Quaid-e-Azam Muhammad Ali Jinnah in 1937, and was nicknamed as Chhota Aligarh (Little Aligarh) by him.
- Pakistan Command and Staff College
- Sardar Bahadur Khan Women's University
- St Francis Grammar School
- St. Joseph's Convent School, Quetta
- Government Science College, Quetta
- Tameer-e-Nau Public College
- University Law College, Quetta
- University of Balochistan

== Sports ==
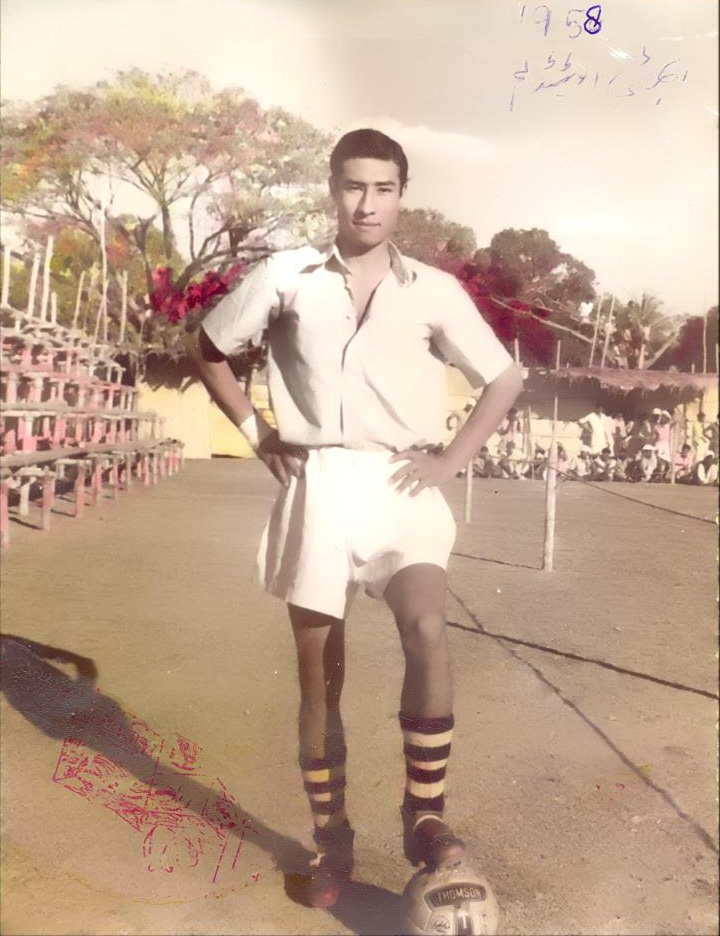
The Qayyum Papa Stadium is named after Pakistan national football team captain Qayyum Changezi, hailing from Quetta

Football is the most popular sport among the people of Quetta. The city has produced notable footballers for the Pakistan national football team including Abdul Wahid Durrani, Qayyum Changezi, Ayub Dar, Mohammad Ali, and Rajab Ali Hazara. Main football clubs from Quetta include Baloch Quetta, Hazara Club Quetta. Balochistan United WFC won the 2014 National Women Championship. The major football ground is Ayub National Stadium, a multipurpose stadium also used for athletics. Other football grounds include Qayyum Papa Stadium and Sadiq Shaheed Stadium.

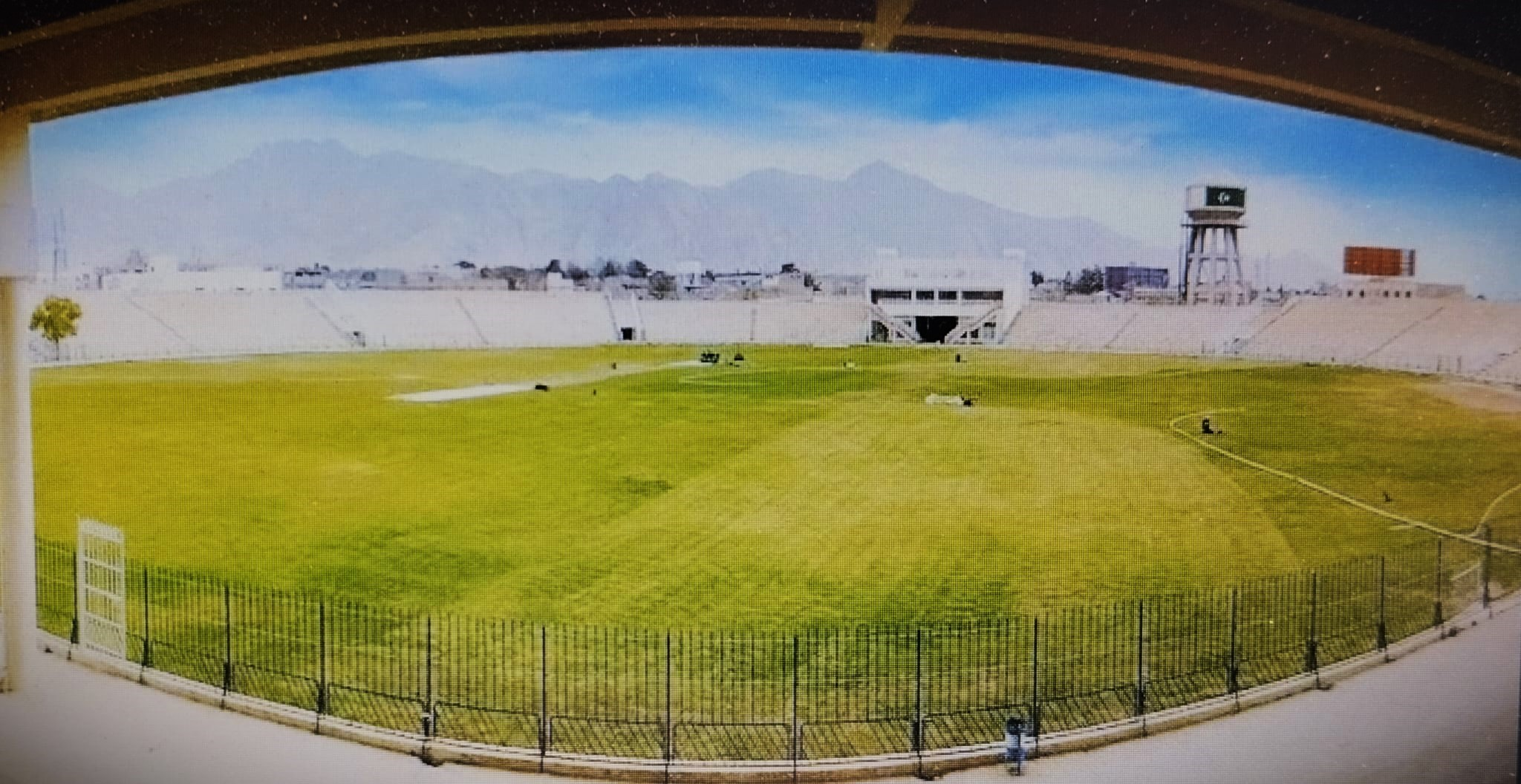
Bugti Stadium, home of Quetta Gladiators

Bugti Stadium is the home of Balochistan cricket team, a first-class cricket team which competes in domestic tournaments, and the Quetta-based team Quetta Gladiators compete in the Pakistan Super League (PSL). They were the champion of the PSL 2019.

Boxing is highly popular as well. Muhammad Waseem is a professional boxer from Quetta. In Body Building Nisar Ahmed Khilji has Mr. Balochistan and Mr. Pakistan Titles and Pakistan representation in International Body Building Contests. In hockey, Quetta has produced Zeeshan Ashraf and Shakeel Abbasi, who were members of the Pakistan's national hockey team.

=== Facilities ===
Local facilities were created in the city for mountain climbing and caving as well as water sports. Hayatullah Khan Durrani (Pride of Performance) is the chief executive of Hayat Durrani Water Sports Academy, Balochistan's first and only Rowing, Canoeing, Kayaking, Sailing, rough swimming and boating academy where all such facilities provide free to the youth members at Hanna Lake.

== Gallery ==
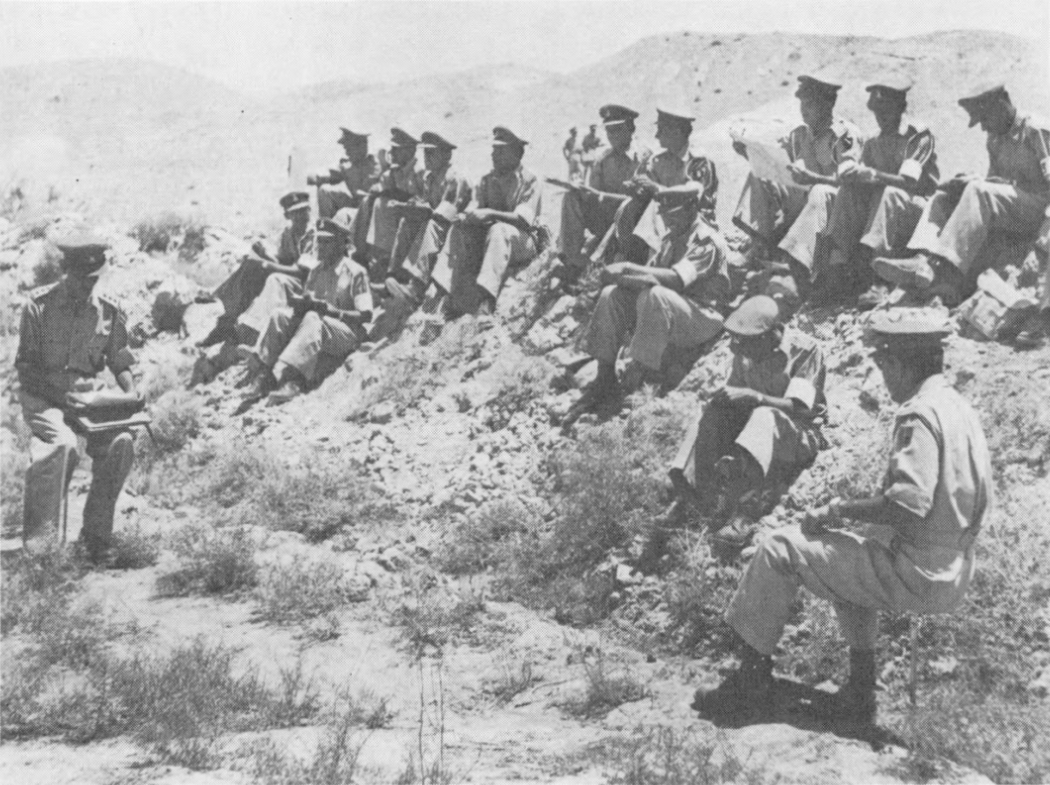
Junior officers in a tactical discussion at the Infantry School, Quetta

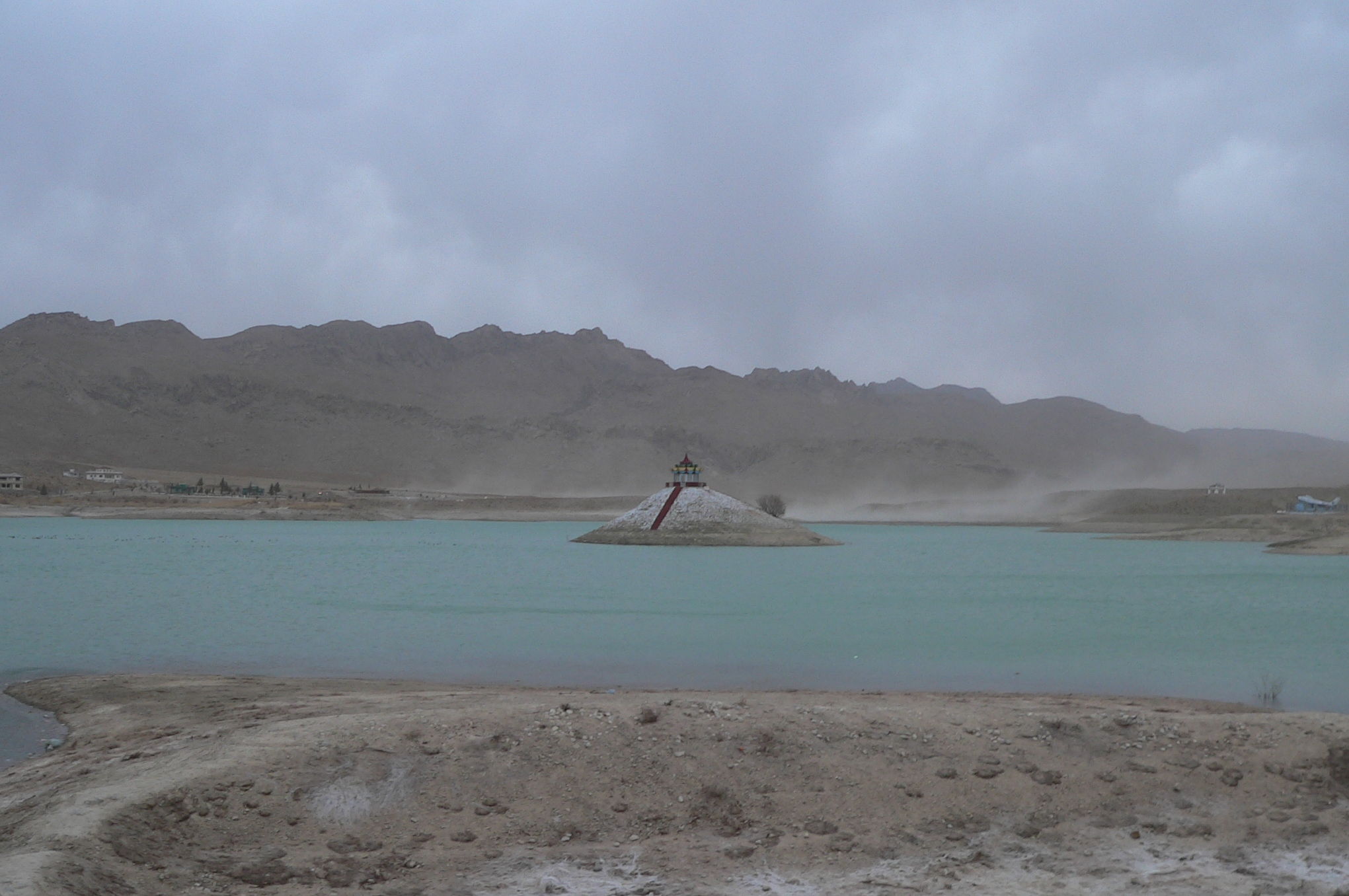
Hanna Lake

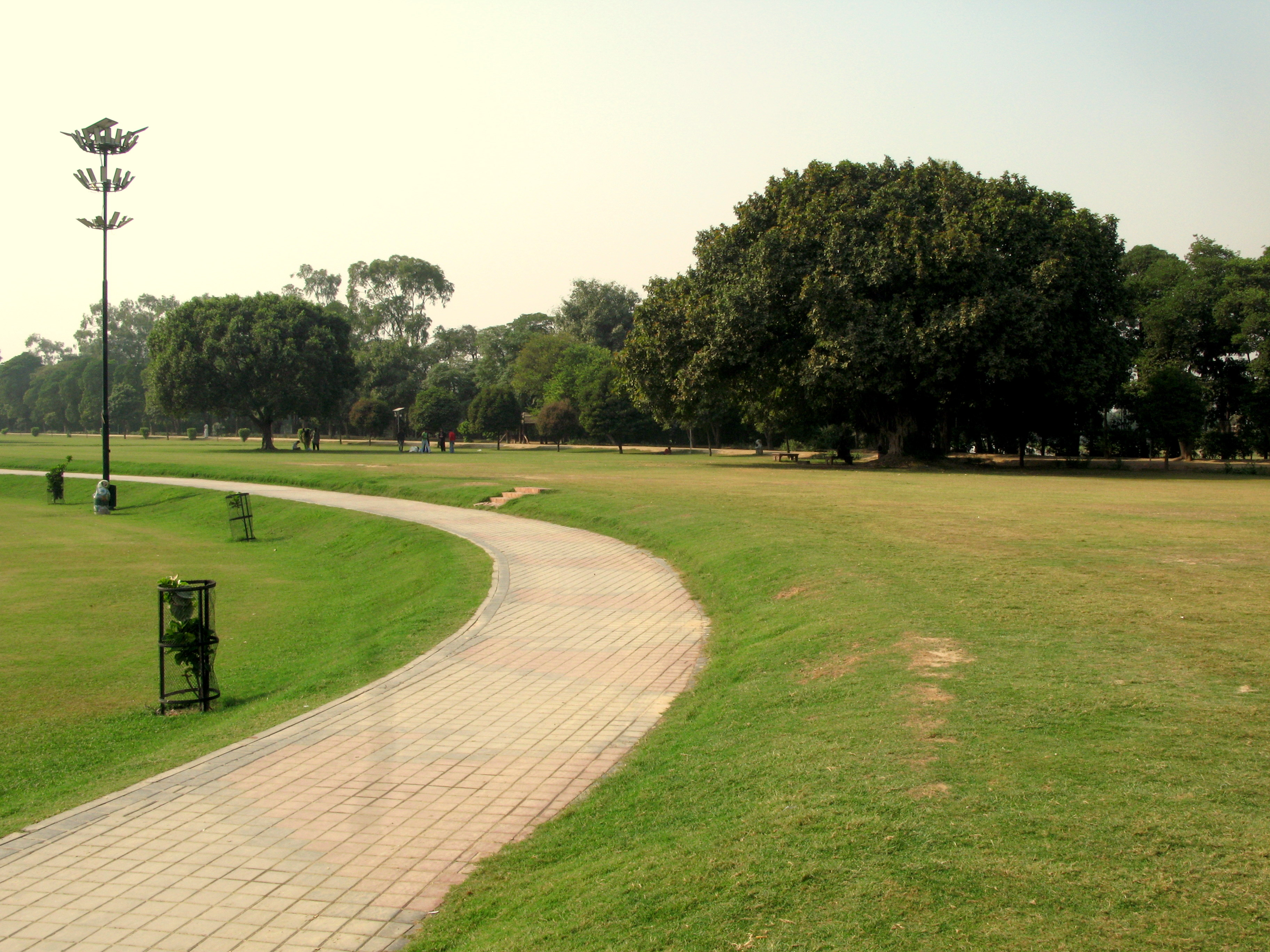
Askari Park

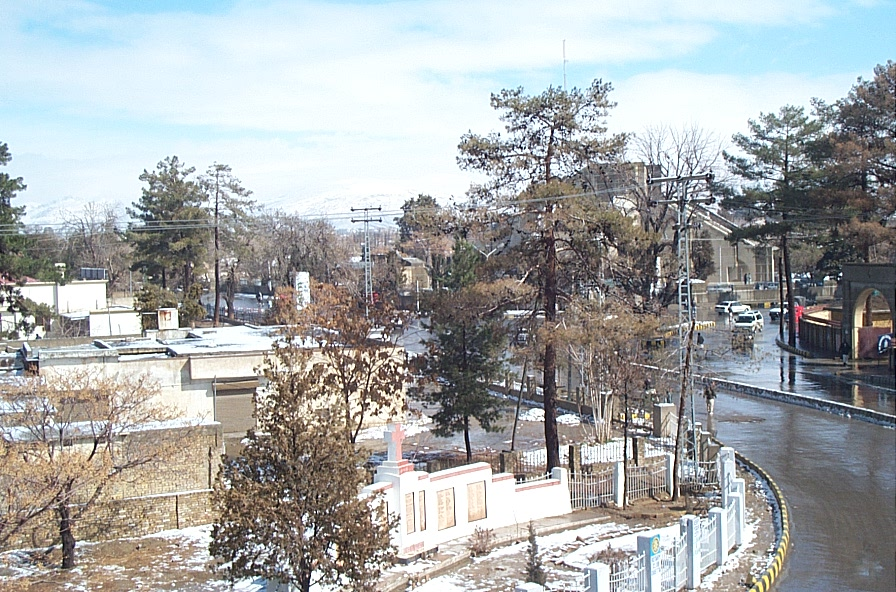
Jinnah Road

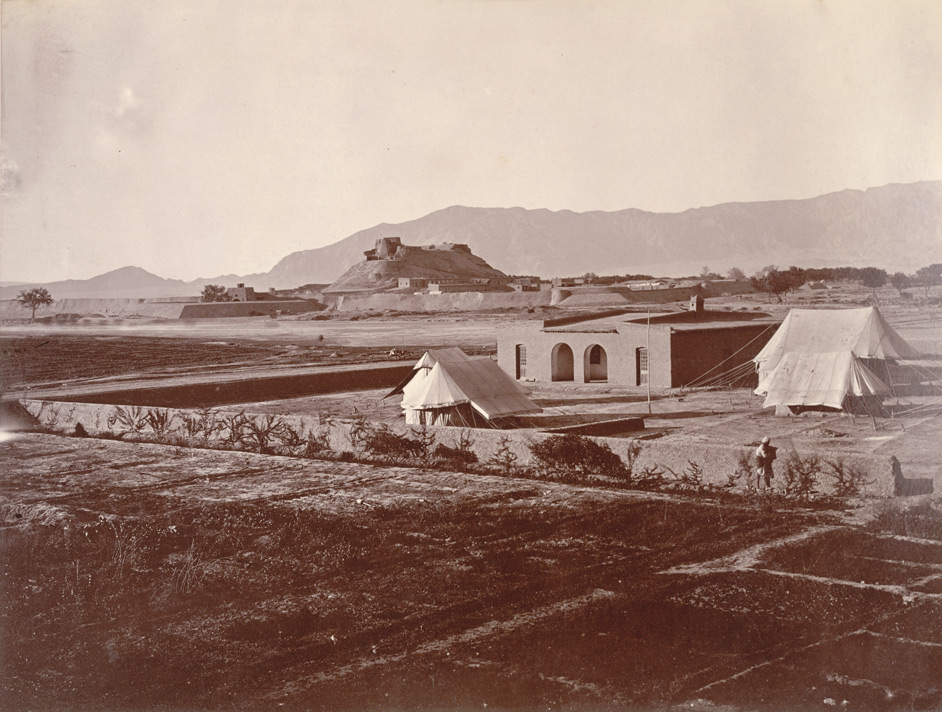
Quetta in 1880

== See also ==
- 2008 Ziarat earthquake
- Balochi cuisine
- Governor's House, Quetta
- List of people from Quetta
- Quetta hut
- Quetta Memorial Precinct
- RMS Quetta

== Bibliography ==
- Bosworth, C.E. (1986). "Kwat́́t́́a". In Bosworth, C. E.; van Donzel, E.; Lewis, B. & Pellat, Ch. (eds.). The Encyclopaedia of Islam, Second Edition. Volume V: Khe–Mahi. Leiden: E. J. Brill. ISBN 978-90-04-07819-2.
- Jonah Blank; Christopher Clary; Brian Nichiporuk (30 October 2014), Drivers of Long-Term insecurity and Instability in Pakistan: Urbanization, Rand Corporation, p. 29, ISBN 978-0-83-308751-5
- Sami, Muhammad; Waseem, Amir; Akbar, Sher (July 2006). "Quantitative estimation of dust fall and smoke particles in Quetta Valley". Journal of Zhejiang University Science B. 7 (7): 542–547. doi:10.1631/jzus.2006.B0542. PMC 1500881. PMID 16773727.
