= Mayor of Sukkur =

- ناظم سکھر
- Sukkur Municipal Corporation
- Incumbent; Arsalan Sheikh since February 2023
- Residence: Sukkur
- Appointer: Electorate of Sukkur
- Term length: Four years
- Deputy: Deputy Mayor of Sukkur
- Website: Official website

Nazim-e-Sukkur (Urdu: ناظم سکھر) is the Mayor who heads the Sukkur Municipal Corporation (SMC) which controls the Local Government system of Sukkur.

== Sukkur Municipal Corporation ==
There are 32 Union Councils in Sukkur Municipal Corporation(SMC), the body which controls local government of Sukkur. The Union Councils elect their chairmen and Vice Chairmen who then elect their Mayor and Deputy Mayor respectively.

== List of mayors ==
Following is the list of mayors of Sukkur in recent times

#	Mayor	Starting term	Ending term	Deputy Mayor	Affiliation	Notes
1	Nasir Hussain Shah (1st Term)	2001	2005		PPP	City District Government Sukkur
2	Nasir Hussain Shah (2nd Term)	2005	2010		PPP	
Commissioner System was implemented during 2010 - 2016
3	Arsalan Shaikh (1st Term)	2016	2020	Tariq Chauhan	PPP	Sindh Local Govt Act 2013 (SLGA), youngest mayor of Pakistan
Administrator System was implemented from September 2020 - July 2023
4	Arsalan Sheikh (2nd Term)	2023	Incumbent		PPP	

== Mayor elections history ==
=== Mayor elections 2015 ===
Sukkur Municipal Elections 2015
#	Party	SMC	Percentage %
1	Pakistan Peoples Party	18	69%
2	Muttahida Qaumi Movement Pakistan	3	11.5%
3	Independents	5	19.5%
Total		26	100%
Votes Polled		291,092	53.5%
Total Votes		543,947	100%

As a result, PPP mayor and deputy mayors were elected as Mayors of Sukkur. They took oath on August 30, 2016.

== See also ==
- Mayor of Karachi
- Mayor of Hyderabad
- Mayor of Faisalabad
