= Mayor of Islamabad =

- ناظم اسلام آباد
- Incumbent; Vacant since 16 February 2021
- Islamabad Metropolitan Corporation
- Appointer: Electorate of Islamabad
- Term length: 5 years
- Inaugural holder: Sheikh Ansar Aziz
- Formation: Islamabad Capital Territory Local Government Act 2015
- Deputy: Deputy Mayor of Islamabad
- Website: Official website

The Mayor of Islamabad (Urdu: ناظم اسلام آباد) is the mayor who heads Islamabad and the surrounding capital territory's municipal administration. The mayor's office is located in G-6, Islamabad.

== Local government system ==
The office of Mayor of Islamabad was created in 2015 as part of the President of Pakistan, Pervez Musharraf's reform of Pakistani local government and introducing district councils. The office of the mayor was created pursuant to the Islamabad Capital Territory Local Government Act 2015, passed by the National Assembly and Senate in 2015. Islamabad has 50 Union Councils.

In addition to the mayor, three Deputy mayors are also elected to the office.

=== Administrative powers ===
The mayor leads the Metropolitan Corporation Islamabad (MCI) whose executive branch consists of 77 elected officials; comprising 50 union council chairmen and 27 reserved seatholders. The IMC has 11,000 employees and its functions include urban planning, road maintenance, environment control, building control, water supply, sanitation, and other municipal services for the Islamabad Capital Territory. The mayor also chairs the Capital Development Authority (CDA) which has around 4,500 employees; its scope is mainly confined to estate management, sector developments and project executions.

== List of mayors ==
#	Mayor	Took office	Left office	Deputy Mayors	Affiliation	Notes
1	Sheikh Anser Aziz	4 March 2016	8 October 2020	Chaudhry Riffat Javed, Syed Zeeshan Ali Naqvi, Muhammad Azam Khan	PML-N	Islamabad mayorship inauguration
2	Pir Adil Gilani	4 January 2021	16 February 2021		PML-N	
Administrator system implemented from October 2021–present

Sheikh Anser Aziz was the first mayor of Islamabad. He took his oath on 4 March 2016. Following the announcement of an inquiry by the National Accountability Bureau for alleged corruption and misuse of authority, Aziz tendered his resignation. As a result of his resignation, a by-election was held in the Islamabad electoral college with the PML-N's Adil Gillani being elected as mayor.

== Mayoral election history ==
=== Mayoral election 2015 ===
Islamabad Local Government Elections 2015
Party		IMC	Percentage %
1	Pakistan Muslim League (N)	21	42%
2	Pakistan Tehreek-e-Insaf	15	30%
3	Independents	14	28%
Total		50	100%

PML-(N) held a two-thirds majority in the Islamabad Metropolitan Corporation.

== See also ==
- Mayor of Karachi
- Mayor of Rawalpindi
- Mayor of Lahore
- Mayor of Peshawar
