= Sheikh Ansar Aziz =

Pakistani politician

Sheikh Anser Aziz is a Pakistani politician who was mayor of Islamabad between 4 March 2016 and 1 October 2020. A member of the ruling PML-N party, Anser was elected to the office on 15 February 2016. After the issuance of a Notification to hand over the functions of MCI to CDA, Aziz tendered his resignation.
