= Rawalpindi Metropolitan Corporation =

Pakistani municipal authority

- بلدیہ راولپنڈی
- Abbreviation: MCR
- Type: Metropolitan Corporation
- Purpose: Urban planning; Building control
- Headquarters: Rawalpindi, Pakistan
- Location: Rawalpindi, Pakistan
- Region served: Rawalpindi
- Mayor: Vacant
- Deputy Mayor: Vacant
- Website: Punjab Government

Metropolitan Corporation Rawalpindi (MCR) (Urdu: بلدیہ راولپنڈی) is a municipal authority established under the Punjab Local Government Act 2022 in Rawalpindi, Pakistan. MCR comprises 46 Union Councils in Rawalpindi city, Pakistan. The Union Councils elect their own chairman, who are in turn responsible for electing Rawalpindi's Mayor and Deputy Mayors.

The Metropolitan Corporation Rawalpindi is in-charge of many tasks in the city of Rawalpindi, such as waste management, environmental preservation, and construction projects, to name a few. Since its establishment, it has been determined that the Rawalpindi Corporation will take over the responsibilities for planning, the building control section, sanitation, road maintenance, the environment, water supply, play areas, the sports directorate, and all municipal services.

== List of mayors of Rawalpindi ==
Following is the list of mayors in recent time.

#	Mayor	Party	Term start	Term end	Ref	Deputy Mayor
1	Raja Tariq Kiani	PPP	2001	2005		Javed Ikhlas
2	Javed Ikhlas	PML-N	October 2005	2010		
3	Sardar Naseem Khan	PML-N	October 2010	2016		
4	Sardar Mohammad Naseem	PML-N	December 2016			Chaudhry Tariq Mahmood
