= List of members of the Swiss Council of States (2011–2015) =

This is a list of members of the Swiss Council of States of the 49th legislature (2011-2015). Most members were elected in the 2011 election.

== Current members ==
C.	Councillor	Party	W.	Notes
AG	Christine Egerszegi	FDP.The Liberals		
AG	Pascale Bruderer	Social Democratic Party		
AI	Ivo Bischofberger	Christian Democratic People's Party		
AR	Hans Altherr	FDP.The Liberals		
BE	Hans Stöckli	Social Democratic Party		
BE	Werner Luginbühl	Conservative Democratic Party		
BL	Claude Janiak	Social Democratic Party		
BS	Anita Fetz	Social Democratic Party		
FR	Urs Schwaller	Christian Democratic People's Party		
FR	Christian Levrat	Social Democratic Party		Replaced Alain Berset on 29 May 2012.
GE	Liliane Maury Pasquier	Social Democratic Party		
GE	Robert Cramer	Green Party		
GL	Werner Hösli	Swiss People's Party		Replaced This Jenny on 16 June 2014.
GL	Thomas Hefti	FDP.The Liberals		Replaced Pankraz Freitag on 3 March 2014.
GR	Martin Schmid	FDP.The Liberals		
GR	Stefan Engler	Christian Democratic People's Party		
JU	Claude Hêche	Social Democratic Party		
JU	Anne Seydoux-Christe	Christian Democratic People's Party		
LU	Georges Theiler	FDP.The Liberals		
LU	Konrad Graber	Christian Democratic People's Party		
NE	Raphaël Comte	FDP.The Liberals		
NE	Didier Berberat	Social Democratic Party		
NW	Paul Niederberger	Christian Democratic People's Party		
OW	Hans Hess	FDP.The Liberals		
SG	Paul Rechsteiner	Social Democratic Party		
SG	Karin Keller-Sutter	FDP.The Liberals		
SH	Thomas Minder	Independent (sits with the Swiss People's Party)		
SH	Hannes Germann	Swiss People's Party		
SO	Pirmin Bischof	Christian Democratic People's Party		
SO	Roberto Zanetti	Social Democratic Party		
SZ	Peter Föhn	Swiss People's Party		
SZ	Alex Kuprecht	Swiss People's Party		
TG	Brigitte Häberli-Koller	Christian Democratic People's Party		
TG	Roland Eberle	Swiss People's Party		
TI	Filippo Lombardi	Christian Democratic People's Party		
TI	Fabio Abate	FDP.The Liberals		
UR	Isidor Baumann	Christian Democratic People's Party		
UR	Markus Stadler	Green Liberal Party		
VD	Luc Recordon	Green Party		
VD	Géraldine Savary	Social Democratic Party		
VS	René Imoberdorf	Christian Democratic People's Party		
VS	Jean-René Fournier	Christian Democratic People's Party		
ZG	Peter Bieri	Christian Democratic People's Party		
ZG	Joachim Eder	FDP.The Liberals		
ZH	Felix Gutzwiller	FDP.The Liberals		
ZH	Verena Diener	Green Liberal Party		

== See also ==
- Political parties of Switzerland for the abbreviations
- List of members of the Swiss Council of States (2003-2007)
- List of members of the Swiss Council of States (2007-2011)
- Presidents of the Council of States
- List of members of the Swiss National Council
