= List of members of the Swiss Council of States (2007–2011) =

This is a list of members of the Swiss Council of States of the 48th legislature (2007–2011). Most members were elected in the 2007 Swiss federal election.

== Current members ==
C.	Councillor	Party	W.	Notes
AG	Christine Egerszegi	FDP.The Liberals		
AG	Maximilian Reimann	Swiss People's Party		
AI	Ivo Bischofberger	Christian Democratic People's Party		Reelected
AR	Hans Altherr	FDP.The Liberals		Reelected
BE	Simonetta Sommaruga	Social Democratic Party		Reelected
BE	Werner Luginbühl	Conservative Democratic Party		Elected for the Swiss People's Party
BL	Claude Janiak	Social Democratic Party		Reelected
BS	Anita Fetz	Social Democratic Party		Reelected
FR	Urs Schwaller	Christian Democratic People's Party		Reelected
FR	Alain Berset	Social Democratic Party		Reelected; Vice-president 2007/2008
GE	Liliane Maury Pasquier	Social Democratic Party		
GE	Robert Cramer	Green Party		
GL	This Jenny	Swiss People's Party		
GL	Pankraz Freitag	FDP.The Liberals		Elected in February 2008 to succeed Fritz Schiesser
GR	Theo Maissen	Christian Democratic People's Party		Reelected
GR	Christoffel Brändli	Swiss People's Party		Reelected; President 2007/2008
JU	Claude Hêche	Social Democratic Party		
JU	Anne Seydoux-Christe	Christian Democratic People's Party		
LU	Helen Leumann-Würsch	FDP.The Liberals		Reelected
LU	Konrad Graber	Christian Democratic People's Party		
NE	Didier Burkhalter	FDP.The Liberals		
NE	Gisèle Ory	Social Democratic Party		Reelected
NW	Paul Niederberger	Christian Democratic People's Party		Reelected
OW	Hans Hess	FDP.The Liberals		Reelected
SG	Eugen David	Christian Democratic People's Party		Reelected
SG	Erika Forster-Vannini	FDP.The Liberals		Reelected; 2nd Vice-president 2007/2008
SH	Peter Briner	FDP.The Liberals		
SH	Hannes Germann	Swiss People's Party		Reelected
SO	Rolf Büttiker	FDP.The Liberals		Reelected
SO	Ernst Leuenberger	Social Democratic Party		
SZ	Bruno Frick	Christian Democratic People's Party		
SZ	Alex Kuprecht	Swiss People's Party		
TG	Philipp Stähelin	Christian Democratic People's Party		Reelected
TG	Hermann Bürgi	Swiss People's Party		
TI	Filippo Lombardi	Christian Democratic People's Party		Reelected
TI	Dick Marty	FDP.The Liberals		Reelected
UR	Hansheiri Inderkum	Christian Democratic People's Party		Reelected; President 2010/2011
UR	Hansruedi Stadler	Christian Democratic People's Party		
VD	Luc Recordon	Green Party		
VD	Géraldine Savary	Social Democratic Party		Reelected
VS	René Imoberdorf	Christian Democratic People's Party		Reelected
VS	Jean-René Fournier	Christian Democratic People's Party		Reelected
ZG	Peter Bieri	Christian Democratic People's Party		
ZG	Rolf Schweiger	FDP.The Liberals		Reelected
ZH	Felix Gutzwiller	FDP.The Liberals		Reelected
ZH	Verena Diener	Green Liberal Party		

== Former members ==
C.	Councillor	Party	Notes
GL	Fritz Schiesser	FDP.The Liberals	Reelected; appointed to ETH Board, resigned, and succeeded by Pankraz Freitag

== See also ==
- Political parties of Switzerland for the abbreviations
- List of members of the Swiss Council of States (2003-2007)
- Presidents of the Council of States
- List of members of the Swiss National Council
