= List of members of the Council of States (2003–2007) =

This is a list of members of the Swiss Council of States during the 47th legislature (2003–2007). Most members were elected in the 2003 Swiss federal election.

== Presidents ==
- 2003/2004: Franz Schiesser
- 2004/2005: Bruno Frick
- 2005/2006: Rolf Büttiker
- 2006/2007: Peter Bieri

== Members ==
Name	Party	C.	URL
Hans Altherr	FDP/PRD	AR	
Madeleine Amgwerd	CVP/PDC	JU	
Michel Béguelin	SPS/PSS	VD	
Alain Berset	SPS/PSS	FR	
Peter Bieri	CVP/PDC	ZG	
Ivo Bischofberger	CVP/PDC	AI	
Pierre Bonhôte	SPS/PSS	NE	
Christoffel Brändli	SVP/UDC	GR	
Peter Briner	FDP/PRD	SH	
Christiane Brunner	SPS/PSS	GE	
Hermann Bürgi	SVP/UDC	TG	
Rolf Büttiker	FDP/PRD	SO	
Eugen David	CVP/PDC	SG	
Simon Epiney	CVP/PDC	VS	
Rolf Escher	CVP/PDC	VS	
Anita Fetz	SPS/PSS	BS	
Erika Forster-Vannini	FDP/PRD	SG	
Bruno Frick	CVP/PDC	SZ	
Hans Fünfschilling	FDP/PRD	BL	
Pierre-Alain Gentil	SPS/PSS	JU	
Hannes Germann	SVP/UDC	SH	
Trix Heberlein	FDP/PRD	ZH	
Hans Hess	FDP/PRD	OW	
Hans Hofmann	SVP/UDC	ZH	
Hansheiri Inderkum	CVP/PDC	UR	
This Jenny	SVP/UDC	GL	
Alex Kuprecht	SVP/UDC	SZ	
Christiane Langenberger	FDP/PRD	VD	
Hans Lauri	SVP/UDC	BE	
Ernst Leuenberger	SPS/PSS	SO	
Helen Leumann-Würsch	FDP/PRD	LU	
Filippo Lombardi	CVP/PDC	TI	
Theo Maissen	CVP/PDC	GR	
Dick Marty	FDP/PRD	TI	
Hans-Rudolf Merz	FDP/PRD	AR	
Gisèle Ory	SPS/PSS	NE	
Thomas Pfisterer	FDP/PRD	AG	
Maximilian Reimann	SVP/UDC	AG	
Françoise Saudan	FDP/PRD	GE	
Fritz Schiesser	FDP/PRD	GL	
Carlo Schmid	CVP/PDC	AI	
Urs Schwaller	CVP/PDC	FR	
Rolf Schweiger	FDP/PRD	ZG	
Marianne Slongo	CVP/PDC	NW	
Simonetta Sommaruga	SPS/PSS	BE	
Hansruedi Stadler	CVP/PDC	UR	
Philipp Stähelin	CVP/PDC	TG	
Jean Studer	SPS/PSS	NE	
Franz Wicki	CVP/PDC	LU	

== See also ==
- List of members of the Swiss National Council (2003-2007)
- List of members of the Swiss Council of States (current)
