= List of members of the Swiss Council of States (2015–2019) =

This is a list of members of the Swiss Council of States of the 50th legislature (2015–2019). The members were elected in the 2015 Swiss federal election.

== Elected members ==
Canton	Seat 1	Party	Seat 2	Party
Zurich	Daniel Jositsch	Social Democratic Party	Ruedi Noser	FDP.The Liberals
Berne	Werner Luginbühl*	Conservative Democratic Party	Hans Stöckli*	Social Democratic Party
Lucerne	Konrad Graber*	Christian Democratic People's Party	Damian Müller	FDP.The Liberals
Uri	Isidor Baumann*	Christian Democratic People's Party	Josef Dittli	FDP.The Liberals
Schwyz	Peter Föhn*	Swiss People's Party	Alex Kuprecht*	Swiss People's Party
Obwald	Hans Wicki	FDP.The Liberals	N/A	
Nidwald	Erich Ettlin	Christian Democratic People's Party	N/A	
Glaris	Thomas Hefti	FDP.The Liberals	Werner Hösli	Swiss People's Party
Zoug	Joachim Eder*	FDP.The Liberals	Peter Hegglin	Christian Democratic People's Party
Friburg	Christian Levrat*	Social Democratic Party	Beat Vonlanthen	Christian Democratic People's Party
Soleure	Pirmin Bischof*	Christian Democratic People's Party	Roberto Zanetti*	Social Democratic Party
Basle-City	Anita Fetz*	Social Democratic Party	N/A	
Basle-Country	Claude Janiak*	Social Democratic Party	N/A	
Schaffhouse	Hannes Germann*	Swiss People's Party	Thomas Minder*	Independent
Appenzell Outer-Rhodes	Andrea Caroni	FDP.The Liberals	N/A	
Appenzell Inner-Rhodes	Ivo Bischofberger*	Christian Democratic People's Party	N/A	
St Gall	Karin Keller-Sutter*	FDP.The Liberals	Paul Rechsteiner*	Social Democratic Party
Grisons	Stefan Engler*	Christian Democratic People's Party	Martin Schmid*	FDP.The Liberals
Argovia	Pascale Bruderer*	Social Democratic Party	Philipp Müller	FDP.The Liberals
Thurgovia	Roland Eberle*	Swiss People's Party	Brigitte Häberli-Koller*	Christian Democratic People's Party
Tessin	Fabio Abate*	FDP.The Liberals	Filippo Lombardi*	Christian Democratic People's Party
Vaud	Olivier Français	FDP.The Liberals	Géraldine Savary*	Social Democratic Party
Valais	Jean-René Fournier*	Christian Democratic People's Party	Beat Rieder	Christian Democratic People's Party
Neuchâtel	Didier Berberat*	Social Democratic Party	Raphaël Comte*	FDP.The Liberals
Geneva	Robert Cramer*	Green Party	Liliane Maury Pasquier*	Social Democratic Party
Jura	Claude Hêche*	Social Democratic Party	Anne Seydoux-Christe*	Christian Democratic People's Party
* indicates a candidate that was re-elected. Source: Statistics Switzerland

== See also ==
- Political parties of Switzerland for the abbreviations
- List of members of the Swiss Council of States (2003-2007)
- List of members of the Swiss Council of States (2007–11)
- Presidents of the Council of States
- List of members of the Swiss National Council
