= List of members of the Federal Assembly from the Canton of Aargau =

Coat of Arms

This is a list of members of both houses of the Federal Assembly from the Canton of Aargau.

== Members of the Council of States ==
Councillor (Party)	Election	Councillor (Party)
Augustin Keller; Liberal Party; 1848–1848	Appointed	Friedrich Siegfried; Liberal Party; 1848–1849
Karl Blattner; Liberal Party; 1849–1849	Appointed	Friedrich Siegfried; Liberal Party; 1848–1849
Bernhard Friedrich Fischer; Liberal Party; 1849–1851	Appointed	Placidus sen. Weissenbach; Liberal Party; 1849–1858
Johann Haberstich; Liberal Party; 1851–1852	Appointed	Placidus sen. Weissenbach; Liberal Party; 1849–1858
Samuel D. Schwarz; Liberal Party; 1852–1857	Appointed	Placidus sen. Weissenbach; Liberal Party; 1849–1858
Fr. Emil Welti; Liberal Party; 1857–1866	Appointed	Placidus sen. Weissenbach; Liberal Party; 1849–1858
Fr. Emil Welti; Liberal Party; 1857–1866	Appointed	Friedrich Jos. Bürli; Liberal Party; 1858–1860
Fr. Emil Welti; Liberal Party; 1857–1866	Appointed	Jakob Isler; Liberal Party; 1860–1862
Fr. Emil Welti; Liberal Party; 1857–1866	Appointed	Fridolin Stäuble; Liberal Party; 1862–1863
Fr. Emil Welti; Liberal Party; 1857–1866	Appointed	Karl von Schmid; Conservative; 1863–1864
Fr. Emil Welti; Liberal Party; 1857–1866	Appointed	Friedrich Jos. Bürli; Liberal Party; 1864–1867
Johann Haberstich; Liberal Party; 1866–1867	Appointed	Friedrich Jos. Bürli; Liberal Party; 1864–1867
Augustin Keller; Liberal Party; 1867–1881	Appointed	Robert Straub; Swiss Democrats; 1867–1868
Augustin Keller; Liberal Party; 1867–1881	Appointed	K. A. Gottlieb Ringier; Liberal Party; 1868–1877
Augustin Keller; Liberal Party; 1867–1881	Appointed	P. Olivier Zschokke; Free Democratic Party; 1877–1885
Armin Kellersberger; Free Democratic Party; 1881–1905	Appointed	P. Olivier Zschokke; Free Democratic Party; 1877–1885
Armin Kellersberger; Free Democratic Party; 1881–1905	Appointed	Johann Haberstich; Liberal Party; 1886–1890
Armin Kellersberger; Free Democratic Party; 1881–1905	Appointed	P. Emil Isler; Free Democratic Party; 1890–1932
Edmund L. Schulthess; Free Democratic Party; 1905–1912	Appointed	P. Emil Isler; Free Democratic Party; 1890–1932
Gottfried Keller; Free Democratic Party; 1912–1943	Appointed	P. Emil Isler; Free Democratic Party; 1890–1932
Gottfried Keller; Free Democratic Party; 1912–1943	Appointed	Hans Fricker; Conservative; 1933–1955
Karl Killer; Social Democratic Party; 1943–1948	Appointed	Hans Fricker; Conservative; 1933–1955
Ernst Speiser; Free Democratic Party; 1948–1961	Appointed	Hans Fricker; Conservative; 1933–1955
Ernst Speiser; Free Democratic Party; 1948–1961	Appointed	Xaver Stöckli; Conservative; 1955–1963
Ernst Bachmann; Free Democratic Party; 1961–1971		Xaver Stöckli; Conservative; 1955–1963
Ernst Bachmann; Free Democratic Party; 1961–1971	1963	Robert Reimann; Christian Social Conservative Party; 1963–1979
Ernst Bachmann; Free Democratic Party; 1961–1971	1967	Robert Reimann; Christian Social Conservative Party; 1963–1979
Willy Urech; Free Democratic Party; 1971–1979	1971	Robert Reimann; Christian Social Conservative Party; 1963–1979
Willy Urech; Free Democratic Party; 1971–1979	1975	Robert Reimann; Christian Social Conservative Party; 1963–1979
Hans Letsch; Free Democratic Party; 1979–1987	1979	Julius Binder; Christian Democratic People's Party; 1979–1987
Hans Letsch; Free Democratic Party; 1979–1987	1983	Julius Binder; Christian Democratic People's Party; 1979–1987
Bruno Hunziker; Free Democratic Party; 1987–1991	1987	Hans Jörg Huber; Christian Democratic People's Party; 1987–1995
Willy Loretan; Free Democratic Party; 1991–1999	1991	Hans Jörg Huber; Christian Democratic People's Party; 1987–1995
Willy Loretan; Free Democratic Party; 1991–1999	1995	Maximilian Reimann; Swiss People's Party; 1995–2011
Thomas Pfisterer; Free Democratic Party; 1999–2007	1999	Maximilian Reimann; Swiss People's Party; 1995–2011
Thomas Pfisterer; Free Democratic Party; 1999–2007	2003	Maximilian Reimann; Swiss People's Party; 1995–2011
Christine Egerszegi; Free Democratic Party; 2007–2009; FDP.The Liberals; 2009-2015	2007	Maximilian Reimann; Swiss People's Party; 1995–2011
Christine Egerszegi; Free Democratic Party; 2007–2009; FDP.The Liberals; 2009-2015	2009	Maximilian Reimann; Swiss People's Party; 1995–2011
Christine Egerszegi; Free Democratic Party; 2007–2009; FDP.The Liberals; 2009-2015	2011	Pascale Bruderer; Social Democratic Party; 2011–2019
Philipp Müller; FDP.The Liberals; 2015–2019	2015	Pascale Bruderer; Social Democratic Party; 2011–2019
Thierry Burkart; FDP.The Liberals; 2019-present	2019	Hansjörg Knecht; Swiss People's Party; 2019-2023
Thierry Burkart; FDP.The Liberals; 2019-present	2023	Marianne Binder-Keller; The Centre; 2023-present

== Members of the National Council ==
Councillor	Party	Term start	Term end
Peter J. Bruggisser	FDP/PRD	1848	1866
Johann Doessekel	Liberal	1848	1849
Adolf Fischer	Liberal	1848	1854
Friedrich A. Frey-Hérosé	Liberal	1848	1848
Joh. Ulrich Hanauer	Liberal	1848	1851
Jakob Isler	Liberal	1848	1851
Gottlieb Jäger	Liberal	1848	1851
K. Ferdinand Schimpf	FDP/PRD	1848	1851
Karl Rudolf Tanner	FDP/PRD	1848	1849
J. J. Friedrich Schmid	Liberal	1849	1856
S. Friedrich Siegfried	Liberal	1849	1857
Franz Waller	Liberal	1849	1866
Karl L. Baldinger	Conservative	1851	1852
Gregor Lützelschwab	Conservative	1851	1852
Udalrich Joseph Schaufelbühl	Liberal	1851	1856
Samuel D. Schwarz	Liberal	1851	1852
Wilhelm K. Baldinger	Conservative	1852	1866
Samuel Frey	Liberal	1852	1863
Joh. Rudolf Ringier	Liberal	1852	1854
K. Ferdinand Schimpf	FDP/PRD	1852	1852
Karl Emanuel Fahrländer	Conservative	1853	1854
Gottlieb Jäger	Liberal	1854	1866
Augustin Keller	Liberal	1854	1866
Adolf Fischer	Liberal	1855	1857
Adolf Hauser	Liberal	1856	1860
Joh. Rudolf Ringier	Liberal	1856	1866
Carl Feer	Liberal	1857	1880
Johann Plüss	Liberal	1858	1860
Friedrich Jos. Bürli	Liberal	1860	1863
Adolf Fischer	Liberal	1861	1869
Peter Acklin	Conservative	1863	1866
Arnold Künzli	SD/DS	1864	1865
F. Theodor Bertschinger	Liberal	1866	1872
Friedrich Jos. Bürli	Liberal	1866	1869
Friedrich A. Frey-Hérosé	Liberal	1866	1872
Jak. Alois Isler	Liberal	1866	1872
Fridolin Schneider	Liberal	1866	1869
Samuel D. Schwarz	Liberal	1866	1868
Peter Suter	Liberal	1866	1881
Karl von Schmid	Conservative	1866	1887
Samuel Wildi	Liberal	1868	1869
Arnold Künzli	SD/DS	1869	1908
Arnold Münch	Liberal	1869	1889
Rudolf Urech	Liberal	1869	1872
Friedrich Jos. Bürli	Liberal	1870	1872
Johann Haberstich	Liberal	1872	1881
Theodor Haller	SD/DS	1872	1878
Hans Weber	Liberal	1872	1875
Placidus jun. Weissenbach	Liberal	1872	1874
Karl F. S. Fahrländer	Liberal	1873	1875
Robert Straub	SD/DS	1874	1884
Emil A. Baldinger	Conservative	1876	1907
Johann Rohr	Liberal	1876	1890
Johann Heinrich Riniker	SD/DS	1878	1892
Ludwig Karrer	Conservative	1880	1888
Anton Bruggisser	Liberal	1881	1884
Erwin E. H. Kurz	FDP/PRD	1881	1901
Theodor Haller	SD/DS	1884	1887
P. Emil Isler	FDP/PRD	1884	1890
Max A. Erismann	FDP/PRD	1887	1911
Jakob Lüthy	FDP/PRD	1888	1908
Martin Vogler	Liberal	1888	1892
Albert Ursprung	FDP/PRD	1890	1902
Robert Weissenbach	Conservative	1890	1893
P. Olivier Zschokke	FDP/PRD	1890	1897
Franz Xaver Widmer	Conservative	1892	1896
Emil Frey	SD/DS	1893	1896
Jakob Nietlispach	Conservative	1893	1918
Josef Jäger	FDP/PRD	1896	1905
Hans Müri	FDP/PRD	1896	1912
F. V. Konradin Zschokke	FDP/PRD	1897	1917
Joh. Rudolf Suter	FDP/PRD	1901	1917
Franz Xaver Eggspühler	Conservative	1902	1930
J. R. Friedrich Brunner	FDP/PRD	1905	1911
Alfred Wyrsch	Conservative	1907	1924
Alwin Weber	FDP/PRD	1908	1919
Hans Suter	FDP/PRD	1909	1911
Otto Hunziker	FDP/PRD	1911	1939
Josef Jäger	FDP/PRD	1911	1925
Hans E. Siegrist	FDP/PRD	1911	1919
Gustav Adolf Ursprung	FDP/PRD	1911	1919
Heinrich E. Abt	FDP/PRD	1911	1919
Emil Keller	FDP/PRD	1912	1922
K. Arthur Widmer	FDP/PRD	1917	1919
Otto Tschamper	FDP/PRD	1918	1919
H. Roman Abt	PAB	1919	1942
Jakob Baumann	PAB	1919	1942
Karl Killer	SP/PS	1919	1943
Hermann Müri	SP/PS	1919	1938
Arthur Schmid	SP/PS	1919	1958
Josef Jakob Strebel	Conservative	1919	1921
Richard Zschokke	PAB	1919	1935
Hans Hilfiker	Conservative	1921	1922
Emil Nietlispach	Conservative	1922	1942
Adolf Welti	SP/PS	1922	1943
Karl Braun	Conservative	1924	1925
Hans Fricker	Conservative	1925	1933
Emil Keller	FDP/PRD	1925	1943
August Mühlebach	Conservative	1930	1934
Max Albert Rohr	Conservative	1933	1959
Leonz Fischer	Conservative	1934	1947
Jakob Steiner	SD/DS	1935	1939
Walter Kohler	SP/PS	1938	1947
Adolf Gloor	SP/PS	1939	1944
August Schirmer	FDP/PRD	1939	1947
Eugen Bircher	PAB	1942	1955
Ernst Meier	Conservative	1942	1963
Karl Renold	PAB	1942	1959
Adolf Aeschbach	SP/PS	1943	1959
Rudolf Siegrist	SP/PS	1943	1959
Ernst Speiser	FDP/PRD	1943	1948
Werner Allemann	SP/PS	1944	1963
Jakob Käch	Conservative	1947	1955
Erwin Triebold	FDP/PRD	1947	1955
Walter Widmer-Kunz	FDP/PRD	1947	1967
August Schirmer	FDP/PRD	1948	1959
Xaver Stöckli	Conservative	1951	1955
Ernst Bachmann	FDP/PRD	1955	1961
Adolf Doswald	LDU/LdI	1955	1961
Robert Reimann	Conservative	1955	1963
Karl Steiner	PAB	1955	1967
Walter Gloor	SP/PS	1958	1967
Ernst Haller	SP/PS	1959	1979
Walther Leber	FDP/PRD	1959	1967
Paul Schib	CCS	1959	1971
Arthur Schmid	SP/PS	1959	1979
Hans Strahm	PAB	1959	1966
Heinrich Staehelin	LDU/LdI	1961	1976
Rudolf Wartmann	FDP/PRD	1961	1971
Julius Binder	CCS	1963	1975
Walter Schmidt	SP/PS	1963	1971
Karl Trottmann	CCS	1963	1979
Walter Baumann	PAB	1966	1979
Peter Grünig	FDP/PRD	1967	1977
Louis Lang	SP/PS	1967	1969
Alfred Rasser	LDU/LdI	1967	1975
Hans Roth	PAB	1967	1983
Max Chopard	SP/PS	1969	1987
Josef Fischer	N	1971	1979
Hans Letsch	FDP/PRD	1971	1979
Albert Rüttimann	CVP/PDC	1971	1991
Urs Schwarz	FDP/PRD	1971	1987
Leo Weber	CVP/PDC	1975	1987
Herbert Zehnder	SP/PS	1975	1987
Andreas Müller	LDU/LdI	1976	1979
Bruno Hunziker	FDP/PRD	1977	1987
Silvio Bircher	SP/PS	1979	1993
Theo Fischer	SVP/UDC	1979	1995
Beda Humbel	CVP/PDC	1979	1990
Anton Keller	CVP/PDC	1979	1995
Willy Loretan	FDP/PRD	1979	1991
Ursula Mauch	SP/PS	1979	1995
Andreas Müller	LDU/LdI	1979	1990
Reinhard Müller	SVP/UDC	1983	1995
Ulrich Fischer	FDP/PRD	1987	1995
Rolf Mauch	FDP/PRD	1987	1995
Maximilian Reimann	SVP/UDC	1987	1991
Hanspeter Thür	GPS/PES	1987	1995
Hans Zbinden	SP/PS	1987	1991
Peter Bircher	CVP/PDC	1990	1995
Samuel Meier	LDU/LdI	1990	1995
Ulrich Giezendanner	0	1991	1995
René Moser	0	1991	1995
Maximilian Reimann	SVP/UDC	1991	1995
Luzi Stamm	FDP/PRD	1991	1995
Hans Zbinden	SP/PS	1993	1995
Peter Bircher	CVP/PDC	1995	1999
Christine Egerszegi-Obrist	FDP/PRD	1995	2007
Melchior Ehrler	CVP/PDC	1995	2003
Ulrich Fischer	FDP/PRD	1995	2003
Theo Fischer	SVP/UDC	1995	1999
Ulrich Giezendanner	0	1995	2023
Ernst Hasler	SVP/UDC	1995	1999
Samuel Meier	LDU/LdI	1995	1999
René Moser	0	1995	1999
Maximilian Reimann	SVP/UDC	1995	1995
Rudolf Rohr	FDP/PRD	1995	1995
Christian Speck	SVP/UDC	1995	2005
Luzi Stamm	FDP/PRD	1995	2023
Doris Stump	SP/PS	1995	2011
Hanspeter Thür	GPS/PES	1995	1999
Agnes Weber	SP/PS	1995	1999
Hans Zbinden	SP/PS	1995	2002
Regina Ammann Schoch	LDU/LdI	1999	1999
Walter Glur	SVP/UDC	1999	2011
Urs Hofmann	SP/PS	1999	2009
Katrin Kuhn	GPS/PES	1999	1999
Doris Leuthard	CVP/PDC	1999	2006
Hans Ulrich Mathys	SVP/UDC	1999	2007
Ulrich Siegrist	SVP/UDC	1999	2007
Heiner Studer	EVP/PEV	1999	2007
Guido Zäch	CVP/PDC	1999	2003
Pascale Bruderer	SP/PS	2002	2011
Ruth Humbel	CVP/PDC	2003	2023
Geri Müller	GPS/PES	2003	2015
Philipp Müller	FDP/PRD	2003	2015
Lieni Füglistaller	SVP/UDC	2005	2011
Markus Zemp	CVP/PDC	2006	2011
Esther Egger-Wyss	CVP/PDC	2007	2011
Corina Eichenberger-Walther	FDP/PRD	2007	2023
Sylvia Flückiger-Bäni	SVP/UDC	2007	2023
Hans Killer	SVP/UDC	2007	2015
Max Chopard-Acklin	SP/PS	2009	2015
Yvonne Feri	SP/PS	2011	2023
Beat Flach	GLP/PVL	2011	Incumbent
Bernhard Guhl	BDP/PBD	2011	2023
Hansjörg Knecht	SVP/UDC	2011	2023
Maximilian Reimann	SVP/UDC	2011	2023
Cédric Wermuth	SP/PS	2011	Incumbent
Thomas Burgherr	SVP/UDC	2015	Incumbent
Thierry Burkart	FDP/PLR	2015	2023
Jonas Fricker	GPS/PES	2015	2017
Andreas Glarner	SVP/UDC	2015	Incumbent
Matthias Samuel Jauslin	FDP/PLR	2015	Incumbent
Walter Thurnherr	0	2015	2023
Irène Kälin	GPS/PES	2017	Incumbent
Marianne Binder-Keller	The Centre	2019	Incumbent
Andreas Meier	The Centre	2019	Incumbent
Martina Bircher	SVP/UDC	2019	Incumbent
Benjamin Giezendanner	SVP/UDC	2019	Incumbent
Stefanie Heimgartner	SVP/UDC	2019	Incumbent
Alois Huber	SVP/UDC	2019	Incumbent
Maja Riniker	FDP/PLR	2019	Incumbent
Gabriela Suter	SP/PS	2019	Incumbent
Simona Brizzi	SP/PS	2023	Incumbent
Christoph Riner	SVP/UDC	2023	Incumbent

== Bibliography ==
- "Search Council Members". Federal Assembly.
