= Antonio Riva =

Antonio Riva may refer to:

- Antonio Riva (pilot) (1896–1951), Italian pilot and World War I flying ace
- Antonio Riva (politician, born 1870) (1870–1942), Swiss politician and president of the Swiss Council of States
- Antonio Riva (politician, born 1678) (1678–1765), Swiss politician and jurist
- Antonio Riva (architect) (1650–1713/14), Swiss architect of the Baroque
