= Karl Schenk =

Swiss pastor and politician (1823-1895)

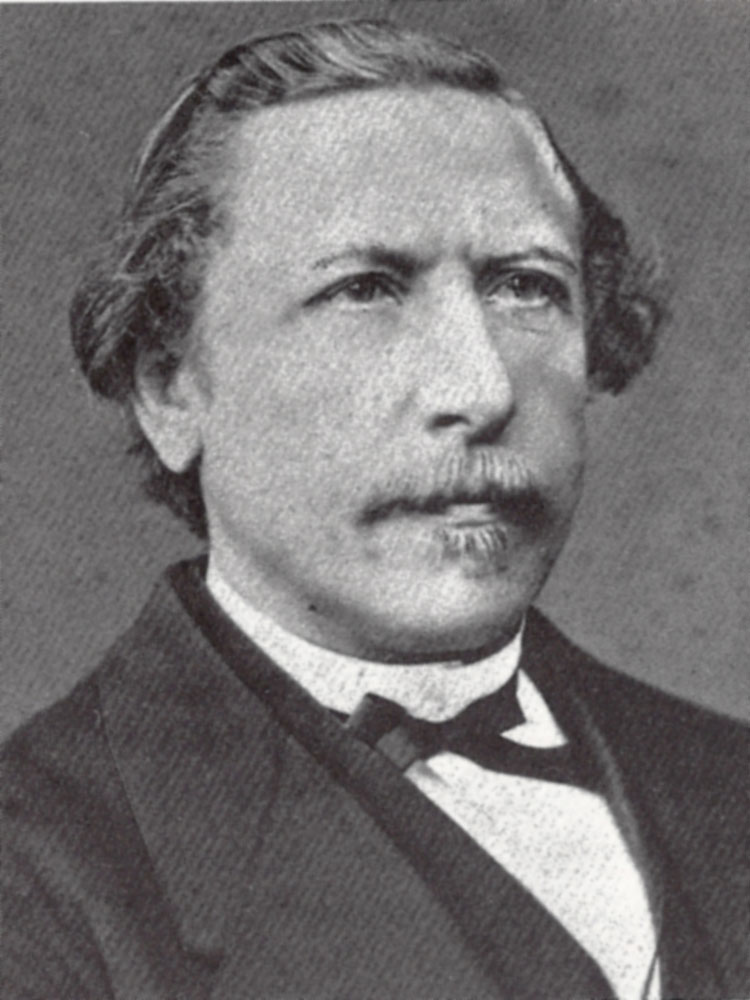

17th, 23rd, 26th, 30th, 37th, and 45th President of Switzerland
- In office 1 January 1893 – 31 December 1893
- Preceded by: Walter Hauser
- Succeeded by: Emil Frey
- In office 1 January 1885 – 31 December 1885
- Preceded by: Emil Welti
- Succeeded by: Adolf Deucher
- In office 1 January 1878 – 31 December 1878
- Preceded by: Joachim Heer
- Succeeded by: Emil Welti
- In office 1 January 1874 – 31 December 1874
- Preceded by: Paul Cérésole
- Succeeded by: Johann Jakob Scherer
- In office 1 January 1871 – 31 December 1871
- Preceded by: Jakob Dubs
- Succeeded by: Emil Welti
- In office 1 January 1865 – 31 December 1865
- Preceded by: Jakob Dubs
- Succeeded by: Melchior Josef Martin Knüsel

Member of the Swiss Federal Council
- In office 12 December 1863 – 18 July 1895
- Preceded by: Jakob Stämpfli
- Succeeded by: Eduard Müller

Personal details
- Born: 1 December 1823 Bern, Switzerland
- Died: 18 July 1895 (aged 71) Bern, Switzerland
- Party: Free Democratic Party

Johann Karl Emmanuel Schenk (1 December 1823 – 18 July 1895) was a Swiss pastor, politician, and member of the Swiss Federal Council from 1863 until his death in 1895. Serving for 31 years and 218 days, he was the longest-serving member in the Federal Council. Later in life he became one of the first leaders of the Swiss Red Cross.

== Life and work ==
Schenk was born in 1823 in Bern, Switzerland, as the son of Christian Schenk. At the age of eleven, he became an orphan and lived in Korntal (Germany). From 1839 to 1842 he attended school in Bern and then studied theology. He completed his studies at the age of 22. In 1845 he became vicar and later pastor at Schüpfen. In 1848, he married Elise Kähr. The couple had nine children, two of which died at young age.

He was elected to the Swiss Federal Council on 12 December 1863 and died in office 31 years later, on 18 July 1895. He was affiliated with the Free Democratic Party of Switzerland.

During his time in office he held the following departments:

- Department of Home Affairs (1864)
- Political Department (Foreign ministry) as President of the Confederation (1865)
- Department of Home Affairs (1866 – 1870)
- Political Department as President of the Confederation (1871)
- Department of Home Affairs (1872)
- Department of Finance (1872)
- Department of Home Affairs (1873)
- Political Department as President of the Confederation (1874)
- Department of Railway and Trade (1875 – 1877)
- Political Department as President of the Confederation (1878)
- Department of Home Affairs (1879 – 1884)
- Political Department as President of the Confederation (1885)
- Department of Home Affairs (1886 – 1895)

He was President of the Confederation six times in 1865, 1871, 1874, 1878, 1885 and 1893.

Schenk also served as President of the Swiss Red Cross from 1873–1882.

=== Death and legacy ===
Schenk died 1895 in Bern, and was buried at Bremgartenfriedhof.

The local museum of Langnau im Emmental "Chüechlihus" includes a section on him. Schenkstrasse in Bern is named after him. Further, the house at Spitalgasse 4 in the city of Bern is named Karl-Schenk-Haus and its passage Karl-Schenk-Haus-Passage or Karl-Schenk-Passage.

Political offices
Preceded by Eduard Häberlin	President of the Council of States; 1863/1864	Succeeded by Jules Roguin
Preceded by Jakob Stämpfli	Member of the Swiss Federal Council; 1863–1895	Succeeded by Eduard Müller
