= Peter Bieri =

Peter Bieri may refer to:

- Peter Bieri (author) (1944–2023), Swiss author
- Peter Bieri (politician) (born 1952), Swiss politician
