= Paul Migy =

Swiss politician

Paul Migy (14 September 1814 in Porrentruy – 1 April 1879) was a Swiss politician from the Canton of Bern and President of the Swiss Council of States (1851) and National Council (1857).

Preceded by Johann Jakob Rüttimann	President of the Council of States; 1851	Succeeded by Karl Kappeler
Preceded by Alfred Escher	President of the National Council; 1857	Succeeded by Augustin Keller
