= Johann Jakob Rüttimann =

Swiss politician

Johann Jakob Rüttimann (17 March 1813 – 10 January 1876) was a Swiss politician, President of the Swiss Council of States (1850/1851 and 1865/1866) and President of the Federal Supreme Court (1854).

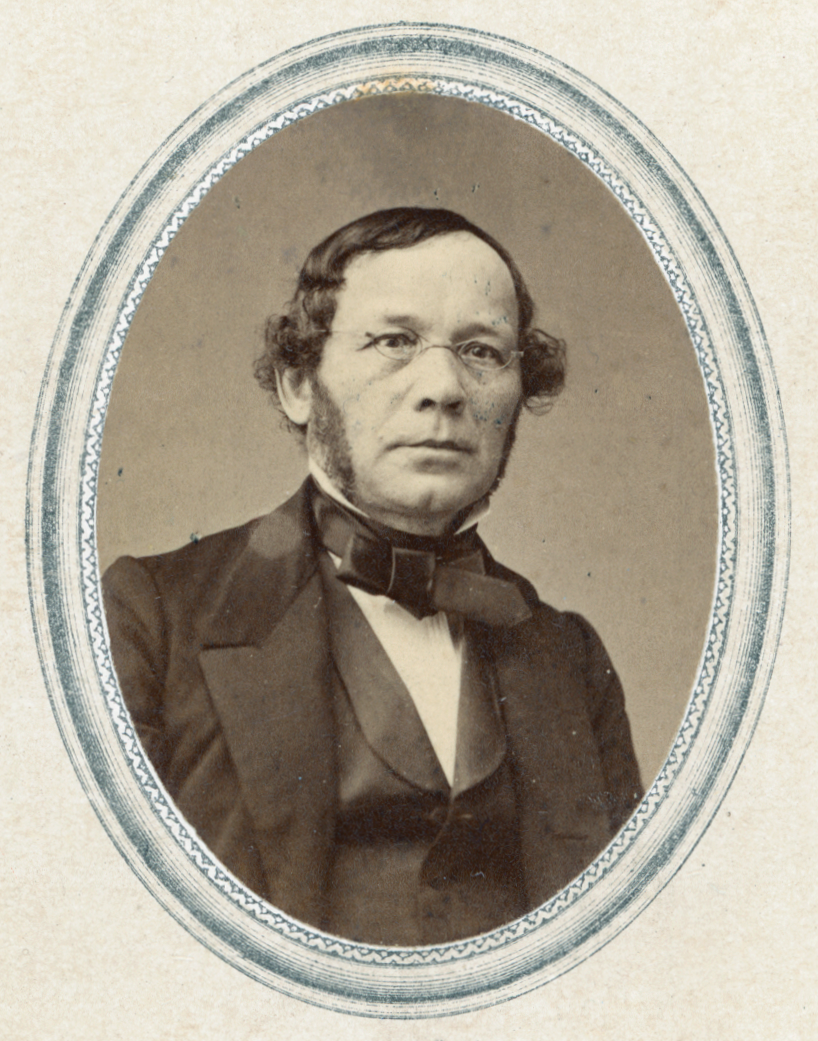
(UAZ) AB.1.0832 Ruettimann

Preceded by François Briatte	President of the Council of States; 1850/1851	Succeeded by Paul Migy
Preceded by Jules Roguin	President of the Council of States; 1865/1866	Succeeded by Emil Welti
