= Jules Roguin =

Swiss politician (1823–1908)

Jules Louis Emanuel Roguin (17 September 1823 in Yverdon-les-Bains – 6 October 1908) was a Swiss politician and President of the Swiss Council of States (1864/1865 and 1872/1873).

Preceded by Karl Schenk	President of the Council of States; 1864/1865	Succeeded by Johann Jakob Rüttimann
Preceded by Karl Kappeler	President of the Council of States; 1872/1873	Succeeded by Alois Kopp
