= Constant Fornerod =

Swiss politician (1819-1899)

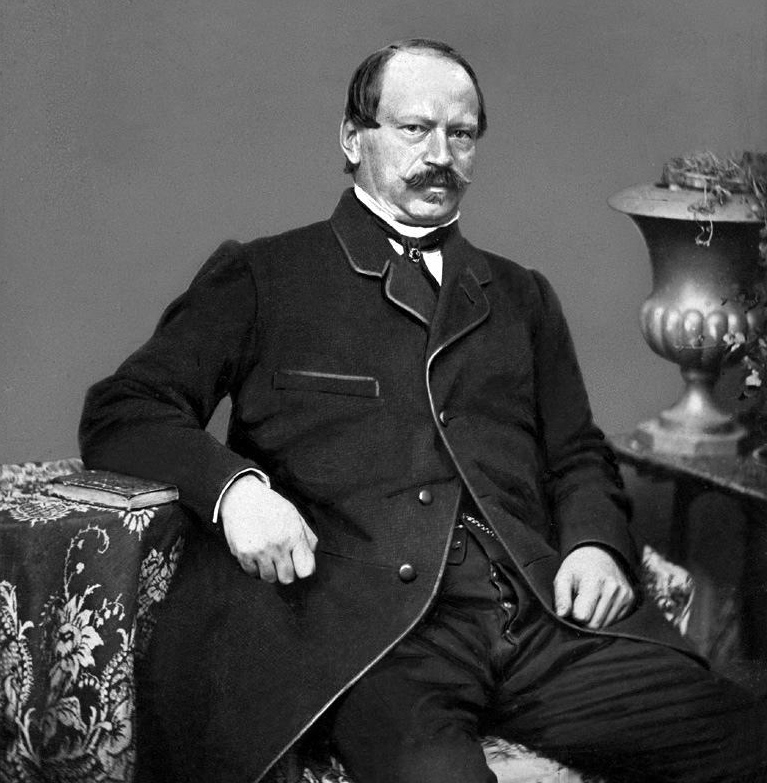
Constant Fornerod

Constant Fornerod (30 May 1819 – 27 November 1899) was a Swiss politician, originally from Avenches, and member of the Swiss Federal Council (1855–1867).

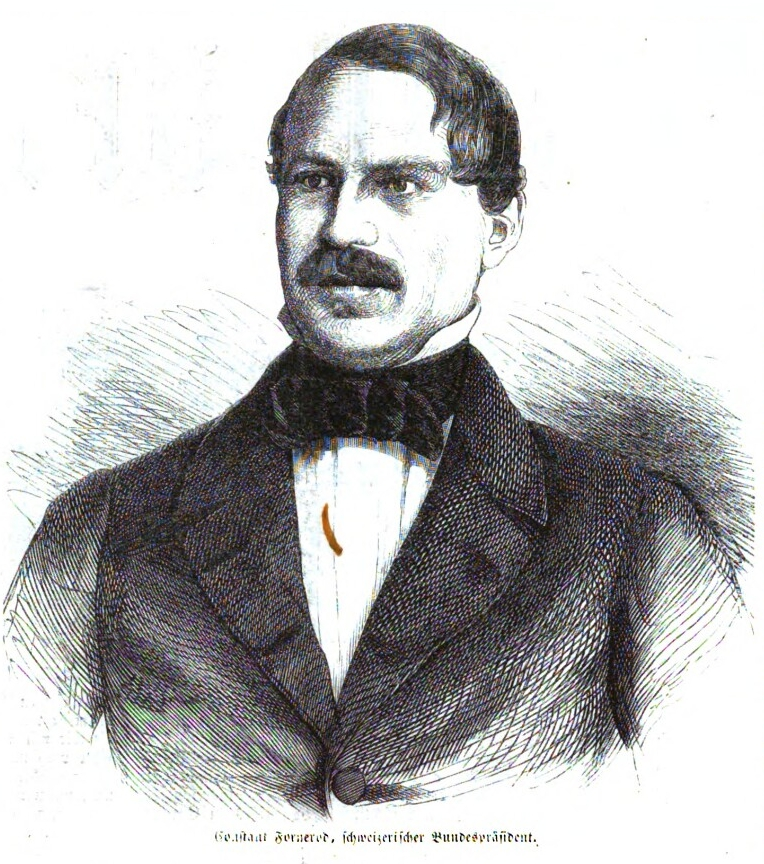

He was elected to the Federal Council on 11 July 1855 as a representative for Vaud. He handed over office on 31 October 1867. He was affiliated with the Free Democratic Party.

During his time in office he held the following departments:

- Department of Trade and Customs (1855 - 1856)
- Political Department as President of the Confederation (1857)
- Department of Trade and Customs (1858)
- Department of Finance (1859 - 1861)
- Military Department (1862)
- Political Department as President of the Confederation (1863)
- Military Department (1864 - 1866)
- Political Department as President of the Confederation (1867).

Political offices
Preceded by Karl Kappeler	President of the Council of States; 1855	Succeeded by Samuel Schwarz
Preceded by Henri Druey	Member of the Swiss Federal Council; 1855–1867	Succeeded by Victor Ruffy
