= Karl Kappeler =

Swiss politician

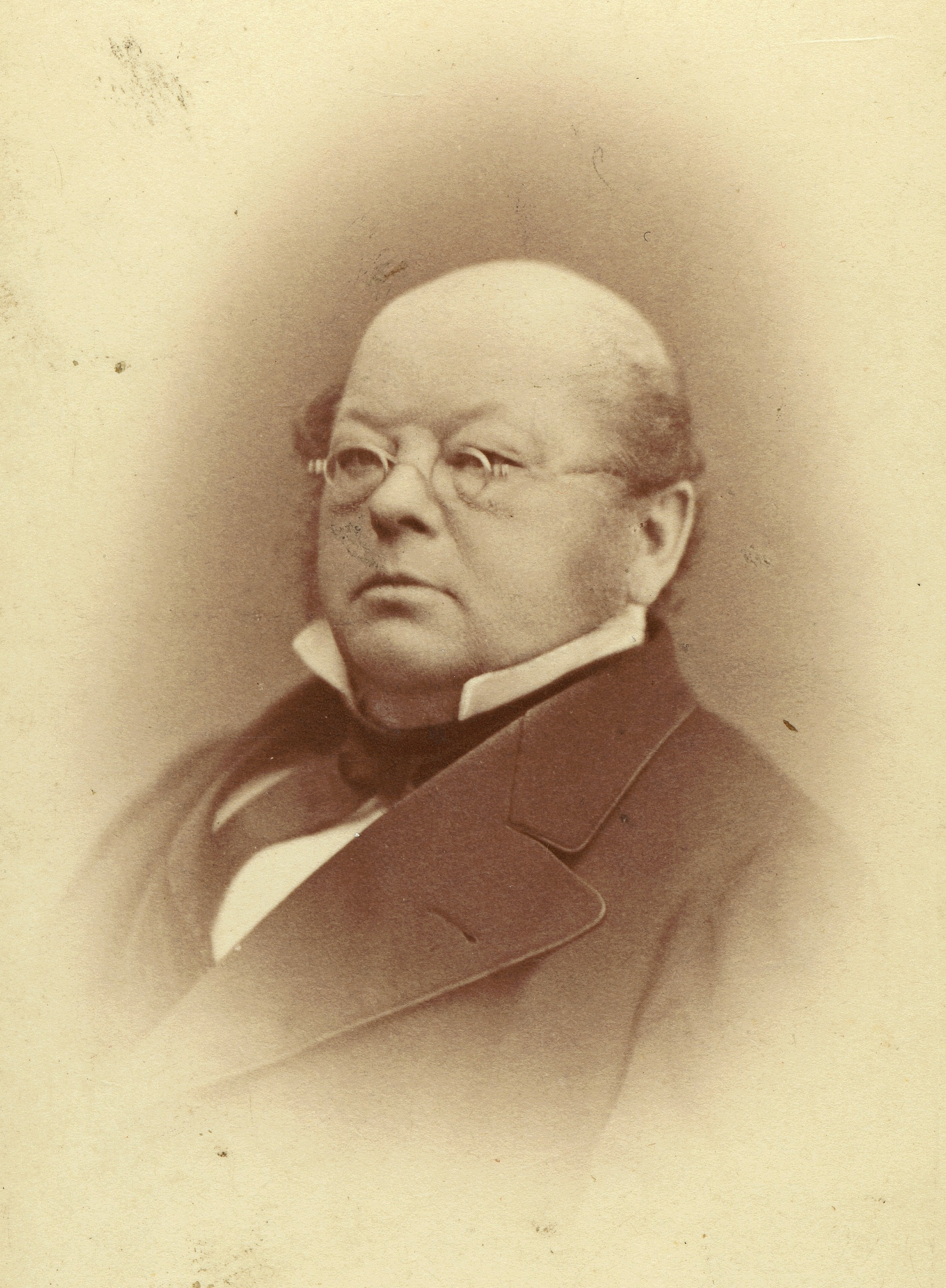
- Karl Kappeler, c. 1880

President of the Swiss Council of States
- In office 1851–1852

Personal details
- Born: March 23, 1816
- Died: October 20, 1888 (aged 72)

Johann Karl Kappeler (23 March 1816 – 20 October 1888) was a Swiss politician and President of the Swiss Council of States (1851/1852, 1854/1855, 1872 and 1881).

Preceded by Paul Migy	President of the Council of States; 1851/1852	Succeeded by François Briatte
Preceded by James Fazy	President of the Council of States; 1854/1855	Succeeded by Constant Fornerod
Preceded by Augustin Keller	President of the Council of States; 1872	Succeeded by Jules Roguin
Preceded by Christian Sahli	President of the Council of States; 1881	Succeeded by Auguste Cornaz
