= Anton Cottier =

Swiss politician (1943–2006)

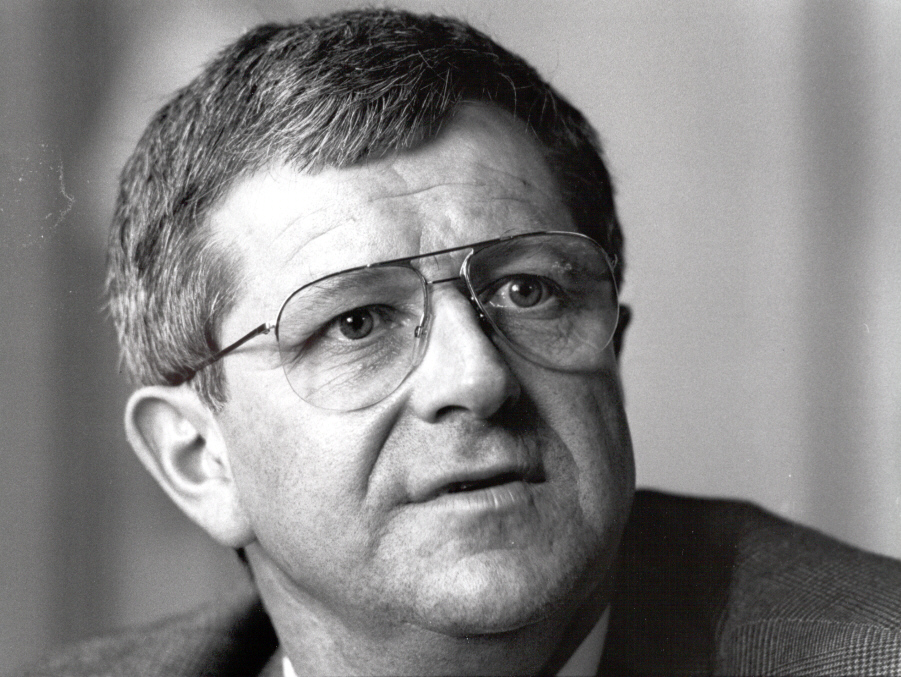

Anton Cottier (born 4 December 1943 in Jaun, Switzerland) was a Swiss politician with the Christian Democratic People's Party of Switzerland (CVP).

Anton-Moritz Cottier was the son of Albert-Roman Cottier (born 29 December 1893 in Jaun and died 4 February 1977 in Fribourg) who was a lawyer, president of the Grand Council of Fribourg, and of Lina Vonlanthen (born 29 July 1903 in St-Anton and died 19 July 1991 in Fribourg). He married Danielle de Techtermann on 3 June 1977 in Fribourg and on 25 June 1977 in Barberêche.

Cottier was born in Jaun, the only German community in Gruyère. He grew up bilingual in German and French. After his legal studies at the University of Freiburg, Cottier practiced law from 1973 and joined the CVP the same year.

He served on the Great Council of the canton of Fribourg (1976-1987). From 1987 to 2003 he served in the Senate, where he held the presidency in 2002. From 1982 to 1991 Cottier was also on the government of the city of Freiburg as communal advisor with the Department of the Police. During the same time he was president of HC Fribourg (now HC Fribourg-Gottéron SA) from 1977 to 1984, which he hire Canadian [Gaston Pelletier] to coach (1978-1982).

Elected to the Council of States in 1987, he presided in 2002 before retiring during the federal election in 2003. In the senate, Cottier worked with the Parliamentary Inverstigation Commission, which was concerned with files from the Department of Justice and Police. Cottier was also president of the Christian Democratic People's Party from 1993 to 1996.

On 3 November 2006 Cottier succumbed to cancer. He had three children.

Preceded by Françoise Saudan	President of the Council of States; 2001–2002	Succeeded by Gian-Reto Plattner
