= James Fazy =

Swiss politician

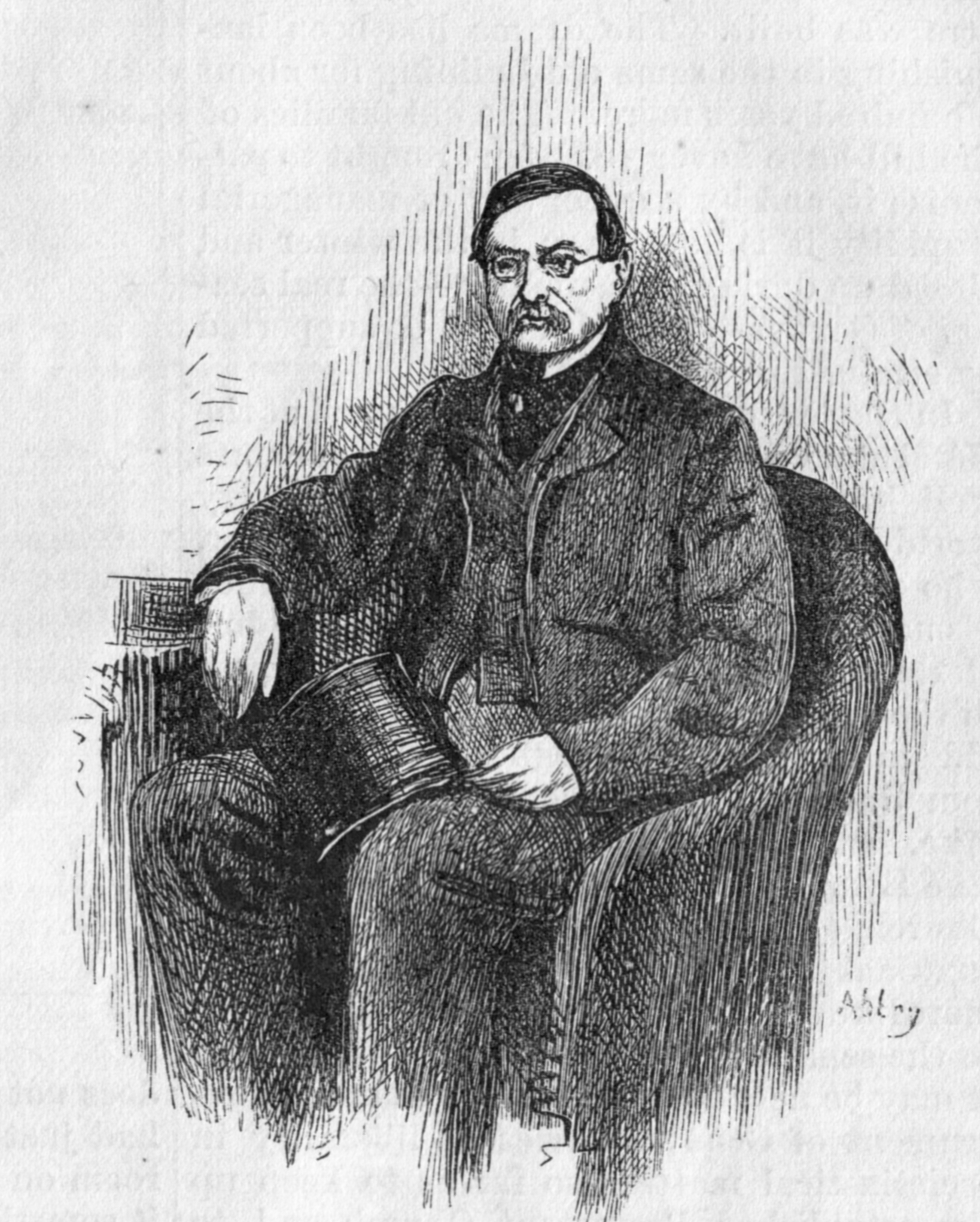
Fazy in 1872

James Fazy (12 May 1794 – 6 November 1878) was a Swiss politician and President of the Swiss Council of States (1854). From 1846 to 1853 and from 1854 to 1861, Fazy was "conseiller d'Etat" (State councillor) in Geneva.

== See also ==
- Plainpalais

Preceded by Johann Jakob Blumer	President of the Council of States; 1854	Succeeded by Karl Kappeler
