= Peter Gerber (politician) =

Swiss politician (1923–2012)

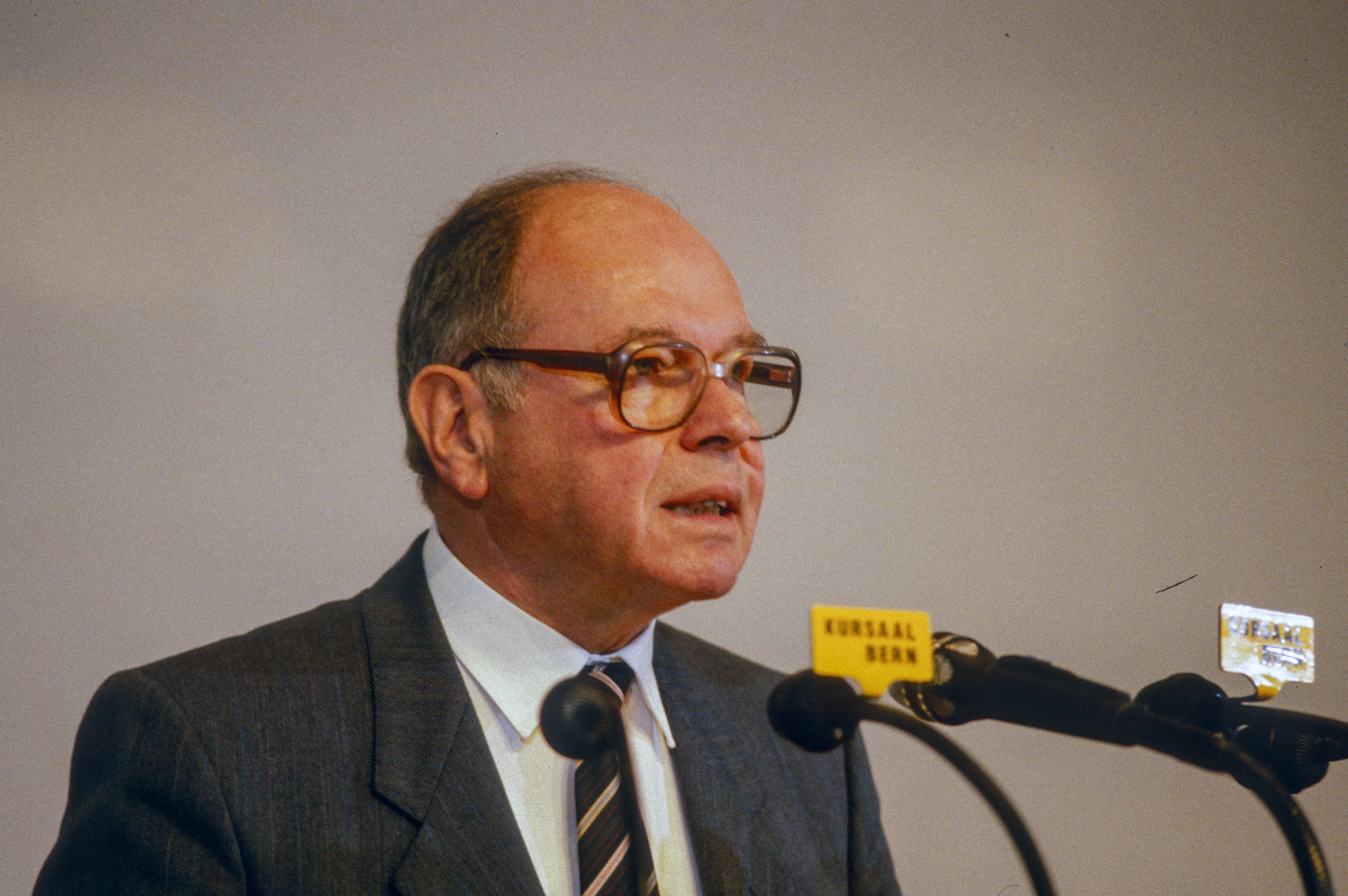
Peter Gerber (1988)

Peter Gerber (8 June 1923 – 11 April 2012) was a Swiss politician and President of the Swiss Council of States (1985–1986).

| Preceded by Markus Kündig | President of the Council of States; 1985/1986 | Succeeded by Alois Dobler |
