= Auguste Cornaz =

Swiss politician

Auguste Georges Adrien Cornaz (28 July 1834, Ballaigues – 13 May 1896) was a Swiss politician and President of the Swiss Council of States (1881/1882).

== Biography ==
=== Background, education and early career ===
Auguste Cornaz came from an affluent and influential Swiss family. His father was a pastor. He studied Law from 1852 until 1853 in Lausanne and from 1854 until 1855 in Munich. After his studies he was a professor for two years at the college of Moudon and was active afterwards as a translator for the Swiss Council until 1864. Afterwards he worked as editor for the radical newspaper "La Suisse". From 1857 until 1860 he was the editor-in-chief of "La Suisse". In 1859 he was part of a delegation led by Caspar Latour to Nepal as Secretary. This delegation was tasked with organizing the return of the four Swiss regiments in service of the Nepalese King back to Switzerland. This order for return was subsequent to a bill of law that was passed by the Federal Parliament of Switzerland, which prohibited Swiss soldiers from being in the service of a foreign army.

=== Politician ===
Auguste Cornaz established himself in 1860 in La Chaux-de-Fonds, the capital of the Canton Neuchâtel and was editor of "National Suisse" from 1860 to 1864, the organ of the Radical - Democratic Party.

From 1864 until 1872 he had a lawfirm in La Chaux-de-Fonds and between 1862 and 1872 he was a member of the Grand Council of Switzerland and the Cantonal Parliament of Neuchâtel for the Radical - Democratic Party.

=== State Council ===
Auguste Cornaz became a member of the State Council of Neuchâtel in 1872. He remained a member of the State Council of Neuchâtel until 1893 and was in charge of the Justice and Police departments during that period of time. He had a major influence and importance in the redaction of the second Cantonbank (1883) and purchase of the Jura-Neuchâtel Railway in 1884.

From 1874 until 1875, from 1879 until 1880, from 1884 until 1885, from 1886 until 1887 and from 1891 until 1892 he was President of the State Council of Neuchâtel, which means the Head of Government of the Canton.

=== Switzerland - Federal Politics ===
Cornaz was also active on the Federal level as a politician. From 1867 until 1868 and from 1876 until 1893 he was a member of the Council of State of Switzerland and the Federal Assembly. From 1881 until 1882 he was the successor to Karl Kappeler (TG) as President of the Council of States.

As a prominent expert on Criminal Law, he redacted and assembled in 1874 the Code of Criminal Procedure and in 1876 the Code of Civil Procedure for Neuchâtel. From 1893 until 1896 he was a [Federal Judge].

Auguste Cornaz was Colonel in the Swiss Army, the highest rank in peacetime.

He passed on 13 May 1896 at the age of 61 in Lausanne.

Preceded by Karl Kappeler	President of the Council of States; 1881/1882	Succeeded by Wilhelm Vigier
