= Gian-Reto Plattner =

Swiss physicist and politician (1939–2009)

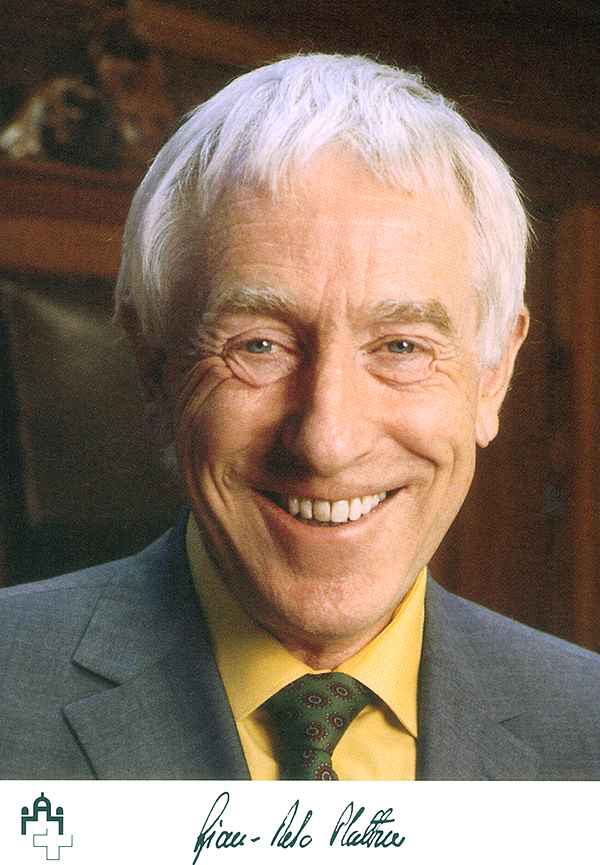

Gian-Reto Plattner (10 December 1939 – 7 December 2009) was a Swiss physicist and politician of the Social Democratic Party of Switzerland.

The son of chemist Placidus A. Plattner, he was born in Zürich. He studied physics at the University of Basel, where he received his doctorate in 1967 and habilitated in 1972. From 1984 he was an associate professor of experimental physics at the University of Basel. From 2000 he was also Vice-Rector for Research, before retiring in 2005.

From 1984 to 1992 he was a member of the Grand Council of the canton of Basel-Stadt. From 1988 to 1992 he presided over the Socialist Group. He later represented the canton of Basel-Stadt in the Senate and served as President of the Council of States (2002-2003).

He died on 7 December 2009 in Basel.

Preceded by Anton Cottier	President of the Council of States; 2002/2003	Succeeded by Fritz Schiesser
