= François Briatte =

Swiss politician

François Briatte (27 September 1805 – 30 January 1877) was a Swiss politician, member of the Conseil d'Etat of the Canton of Vaud (1845–1861), member and several times President of the Swiss Council of States.

Preceded by Jonas Furrer	President of the Council of States; 1848/1849/1850	Succeeded by Johann Jakob Rüttimann
Preceded by Karl Kappeler	President of the Council of States; 1852/1853	Succeeded by Johann Jakob Blumer
Preceded by Jakob Dubs	President of the Council of States; 1856/1857	Succeeded by Johann Baptist Weder
Preceded by Niklaus Niggeler	President of the Council of States; 1859/1860	Succeeded by Emil Welti
