= Robert Reimann (politician) =

Swiss politician

Robert Reimann

Robert Reimann (17 December 1911 – 28 August 1987) was a Swiss politician, member of the federal parliament (1955–1979) and President of the Swiss Council of States in 1977/1978.

| Preceded by Hans Munz | President of the Swiss Council of States; 1977/1978 | Succeeded by Ulrich Luder |
