= Jakob Dubs =

Swiss politician (1822-1879)

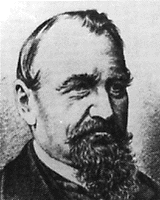
Jakob Dubs

Jakob Dubs (26 July 1822 – 13 January 1879) was a Swiss politician and member of the Swiss Federal Council (1861–1872). Along with Gustave Moynier and Guillaume-Henri Dufour, he founded the Swiss Red Cross in July 1866, and served as its first President until 1872.

He was elected to the Federal Council on 30 July 1861 and handed over office on 28 May 1872. He was affiliated to the Liberal Centre, which later developed into the Liberal Party of Switzerland.

== Life and work ==
During his time in political office, he was responsible for the following departments:

- Department of Justice and Police (1861–1863)
- Political Department (1864)
- Department of Home Affairs (1865)
- Department of Justice and Police (1866)
- Department of Posts (1867)
- Political Department (1868)
- Department of Posts (1869)
- Political Department (1870)
- Department of Home Affairs (1871–1872)

He was President of the Confederation three times in 1864, 1868 and 1870.

Political offices
Preceded by Giovanni Battista Pioda	President of the National Council; 1854	Succeeded by Casimir Pfyffer
Preceded by Aimé Humbert	President of the Council of States; 1856	Succeeded by François Briatte
Preceded by Jonas Furrer	Member of the Swiss Federal Council; 1861–1872	Succeeded by Johann Jakob Scherer
