= Antonio Riva (politician, born 1870) =

Swiss politician

Antonio Riva (21 July 1870 – 18 December 1942) was a Swiss politician and President of the Swiss Council of States (1933/1934).

Preceded by Andreas Laely	President of the Council of States; 1933/1934	Succeeded by Ernest Béguin
