= Augustin Keller =

Swiss politician and churchman

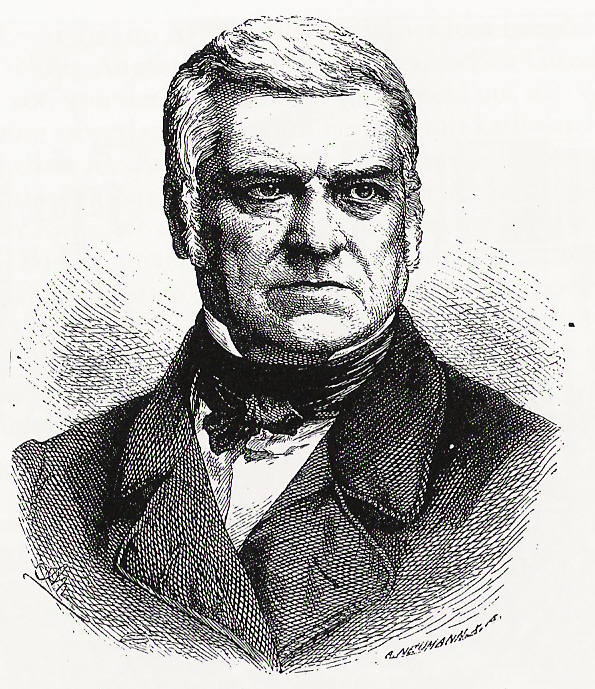
Augustin Keller (1805 - 1883)

Augustin Keller (10 November 1805 in Sarmenstorf, Aargau – 8 January 1883) was a Swiss politician and a co-founder of the Christian Catholic Church of Switzerland, an Old Catholic Church denomination based in Switzerland.

He is considered to have started the monastery dispute of Aargau (German: Aargauer Klosterstreit) which led to the abolition of all monasteries in Aargau in 1841 and the eventual establishment of the Swiss state.

== Early life ==
Keller was born in 1805 to Joseph Keller, a farmer, and his wife Barbara.

After studying philology, history, pedagogy, philosophy and literature in Munich and Breslau, where he was influenced by Ludwig Wachler, Keller first worked as a teacher in Lucerne and was the director of the teacher seminar of Aargau from 1834 to 1856. In this position he learned much about the building up of the education system in the canton of Aargau.

== Career ==
Keller was better known as a radical liberal politician and harsh critic of the Roman Catholic Church although he was himself a Catholic. In 1835, he was elected into the parliament of the canton of Aargau, which he was a part of until 1856.

After conflicts resembling a civil war between government troops and Catholic insurgents in January 1841, Keller called the monasteries antagonistic to progress and made them accountable for the insurrection in Freiamt during a speech in parliament; the government then abolished all monasteries in Aargau. The monastery dispute of Aargau caused an international crisis and ended in the Sonderbund War of 1847, which was followed by the founding of the Swiss federal republic in 1848.

From 1848 to 1881, Keller was politically active on a national level and was almost consistently a member of either the National Council or the Council of States. In 1871 and 1872 he was president of the latter. From 1856 to 1881, he was governmental council member of the canton Aargau. He spoke out for the complete equality for Jews in Surbtal.

As president of the Aargau church council, Keller denounced the dogma of infallibility of Pope Pius IX in 1870 and called for the establishment of an independent Swiss national church during the Kulturkampf. He also worked to ban Jesuits from entering the new country; this ban was lifted in 1973.

In 1871, he was one of the founders of the Swiss Association of Liberal Catholics and was elected president of the synod council in 1875; in 1874 he co-founded the Christian Catholic Church of Switzerland.

== Legacy ==
Augustin Keller was the great-grandfather of a major figure in the Fascist Frontsfrühling in Switzerland, Dr. Max Leo Keller.

A street in Lenzburg is named after him.

Preceded by Paul Migy	President of the National Council; 1857/1858	Succeeded by Johann Jakob Stehlin
Preceded by Abraham Stocker	President of the Council of States; 1871/1872	Succeeded by Karl Kappeler
