= Françoise Saudan =

Swiss politician

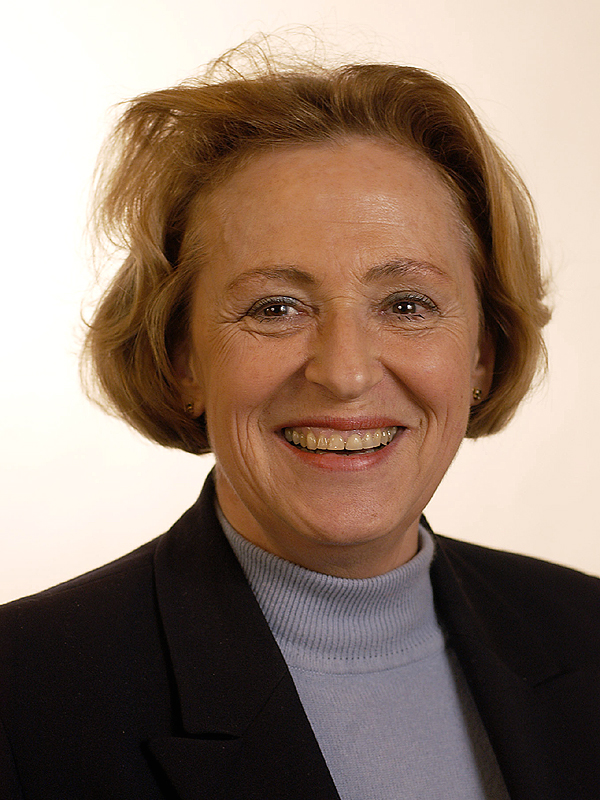

Personal details
- Born: 9 November 1939 (age 86)
- Party: FDP.The Liberals
- Children: 2

Françoise Saudan (born 9 November 1939 in Lyon, France) is a Swiss politician from the party FDP.The Liberals.

Saudan studied law and received her doctorate. After that she worked as a manager.

In 1985 she was elected to the Grand Council of Geneva and nominated in the same year as President of the FDP Geneva. She held the presidency until 1995, when she was elected to the Senate on December 4. In 2000-01 she was president of the Council of States.

Saudan is married and has two children. She lives in Chêne-Bougeries.

| Preceded by Carlo Schmid-Sutter | President of the Council of States; 2000/2001 | Succeeded by Anton Cottier |
