= Bruno Frick =

Swiss politician

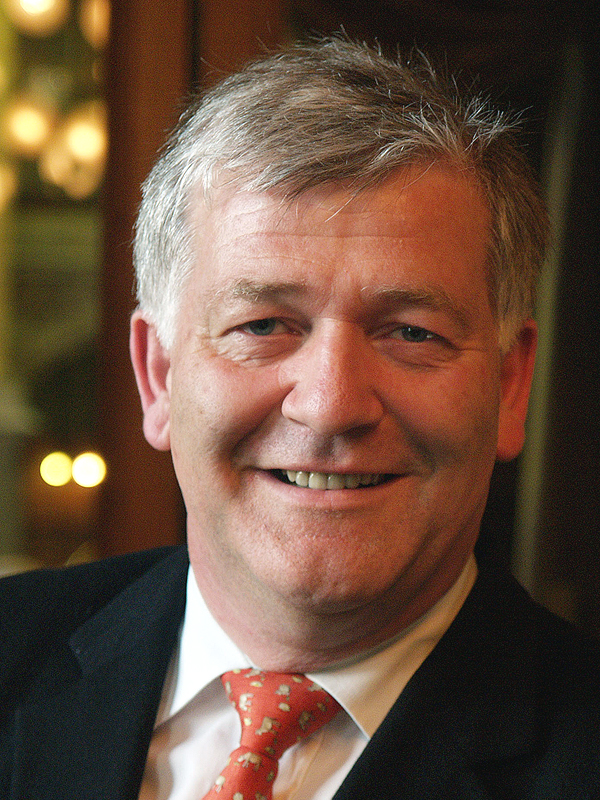
Bruno Frick

Bruno Frick (born 31 May 1953) is a Swiss politician of the Christian Democratic People's Party (CVP/PDC). Frick has been a member of the Swiss Council of States for the Canton of Schwyz since 1991. In 2005, he was president of the Council of States.

Preceded by Fritz Schiesser	President of the Swiss Council of States; 2004/2005	Succeeded by Rolf Büttiker
