= Rolf Büttiker =

Swiss politician and business consultant

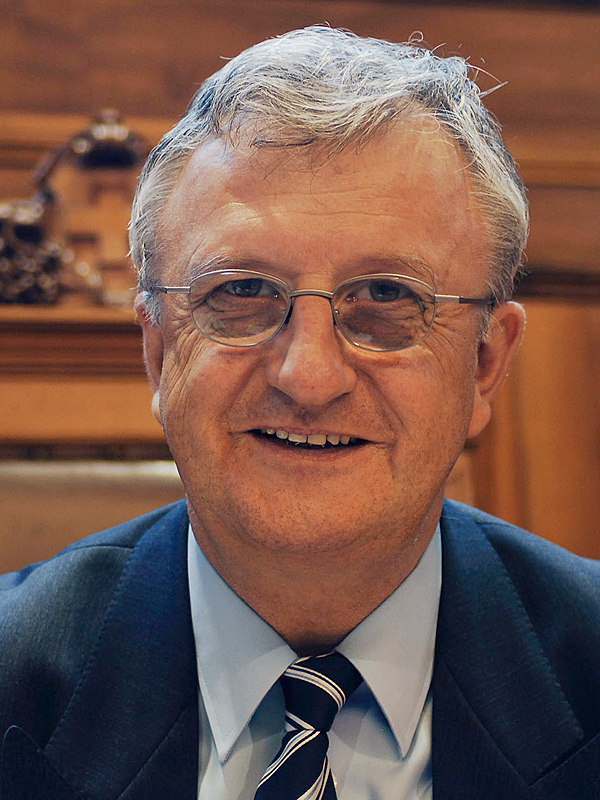
Rolf Büttiker

Rolf Büttiker (born 27 June 1950 in Wolfwil) is a Swiss politician and business consultant. He was President of the Swiss Council of States for the 2005/2006 term. A member of FDP.The Liberals, he was elected to the Council of States in 1991. From 1987 to 1991, he was member of the National Council.

Preceded by Bruno Frick	President of the Swiss Council of States; 2005/2006	Succeeded by Peter Bieri
