= Fritz Schiesser =

Swiss lawyer and politician

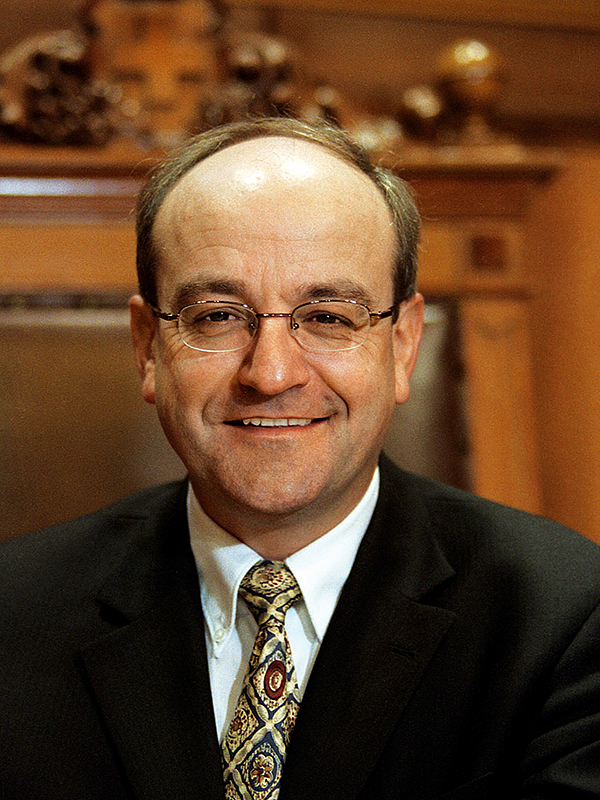
Fritz Schiesser.

Fritz Schiesser (born 23 April 1954) is a Swiss lawyer and politician, member of the Swiss Council of States (1990–2007).

Schiesser became a member of the Swiss Council of States in 1990 as a Free democrat. President (speaker) of the Council of States in 2003/04. He was also member of the Parliament of the Canton of Glarus from 1995 to 2009. Member of the Swiss Delegation to the Inter-Parliamentary Union.

In November 2007, Schiesser was appointed president of the ETH-Board for 2008–2011. The function being incompatible with the membership in the Council of States, Schiesser has to resign from the council, despite his re-election a few weeks earlier. In November 2011, he was reappointed as president of the ETH Board for 2012–2016.

Preceded by Gian-Reto Plattner	President of the Swiss Council of States; 2003/2004	Succeeded by Bruno Frick
