= Carlo Schmid-Sutter =

Swiss politician (born 1950)

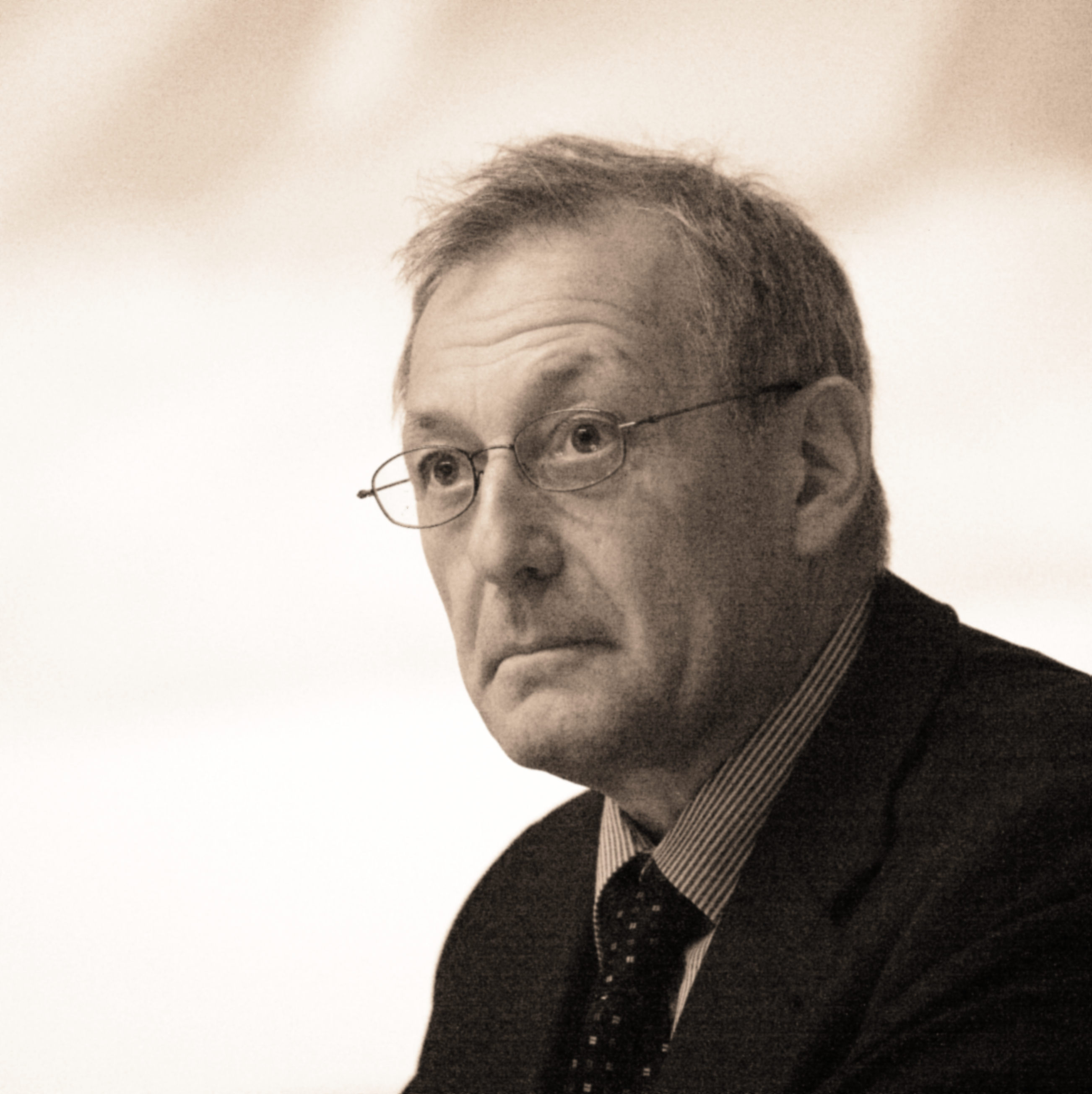
Carlo Schmid-Sutter, 2008

Carlo Schmid-Sutter (born 11 March 1950 in Heiden, Switzerland) is a Swiss politician. Since 1984, he has been member of the cantonal government of Appenzell Innerrhoden. Schmid was a member of the Swiss Council of States from 1980 to 2007, and president of that chamber in 1999/2000. From 1992 to 1994, he presided the Christian Democratic People's Party of Switzerland (CVP/PDC).

In this function, Schmid got caught-up in one of the most important referendums in contemporary Swiss politics: the vote on membership in the European Economic Area which was refused in 1992 by a slight majority of voting Swiss citizens. As chairman of the CVP-PDC, Carlo Schmid had to defend a position which went against his personal (Europe-skeptical) convictions. The party effectively supported the positive attitude towards the EEA taken by the government majority in which it was proportionally represented.

In what can be considered an acknowledgement of his long career in Swiss federal politics, but also as a reverence of his most conservative colleagues in parliament, Schmid received 11 votes to succeed Joseph Deiss in the Swiss Federal Council elections of 14 June 2006 although he did not officially stand for the office.

Preceded by René Rhinow	President of the Swiss Council of States; 1999/2000	Succeeded by Françoise Saudan
