= Christoffel Brändli =

Swiss politician (born 1943)

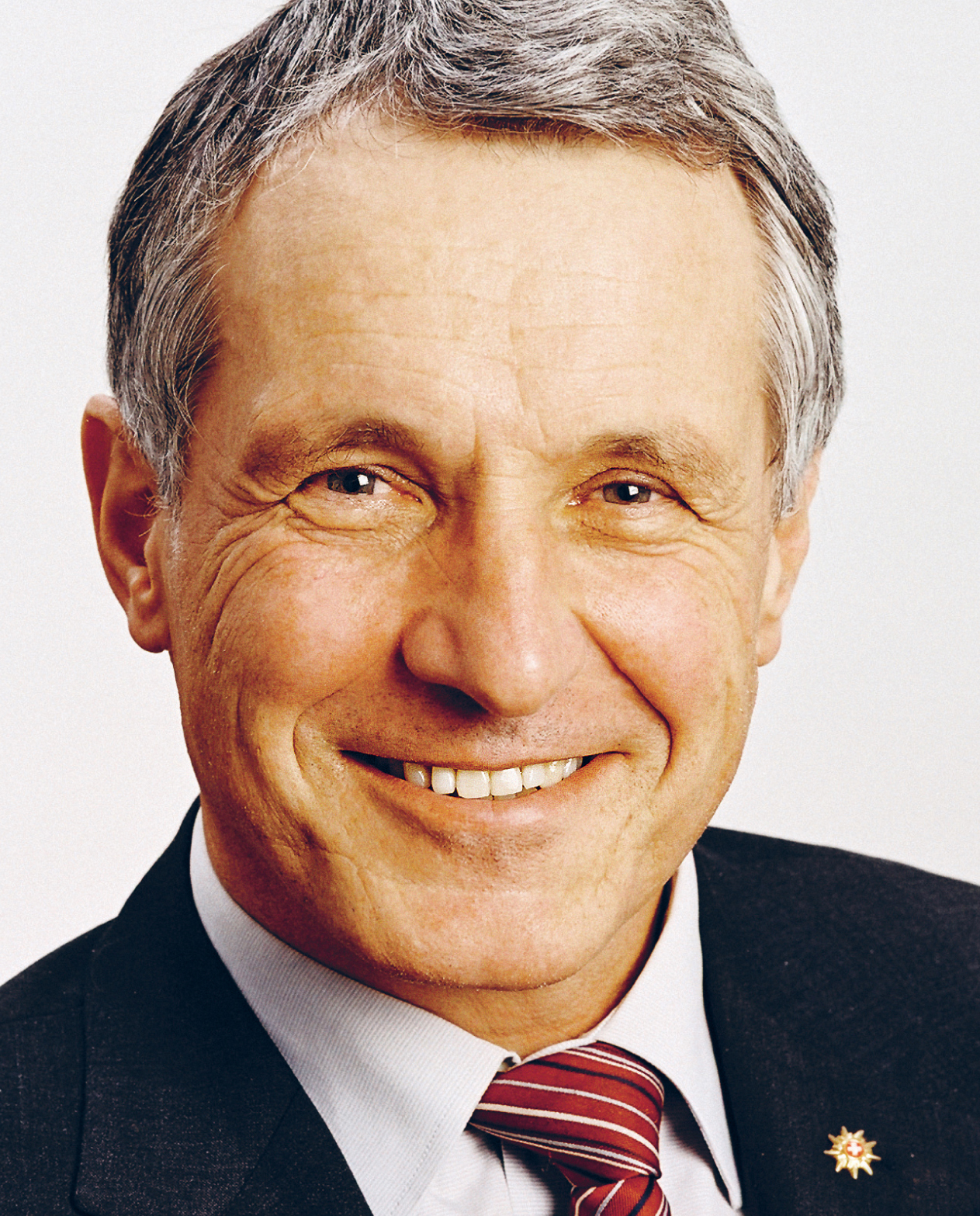
Christoffel Brändli

Christoffel Brändli (born 7 March 1943) is a Swiss politician. He was a member of the Swiss Council of States from 1995 to 2011. He was a member of the Swiss People's Party. He served as the President of the Council of States for the 2007–08 term.

== Biography ==
Brändli was born 1943 in Vnà. He finished his primary and secondary education in Landquart. He then studied at the University of St. Gallen, where he graduated in 1971. He was the member of diverse student organisations and a member of the AV Amicitia San Gallensis fraternity.

Brändli is married to Gretursina Brändli. The couple has three children.

He started his career as an academic, teaching commerce at various schools from 1975 to 1983. He was later identified as a business consultant.

Brändli was elected to a local councilor position at Igis-Landquart in 1969. Ten years later, he became the mayor of the municipality, holding this office until 1983. From 1983 to 1995, Brändli was a member of the cantonal government of Grisons. He was elected to the Council of States in 1995 where he represented the canton of Graubünden in Bern for 16 years. He was a member of the commissions on social security (SGK), environment, spatial planning and energy (UREK), and transport and telecommunications (KVF). He was elected as the Swiss President of the Council of States in 2007.

Brändli also became the president of Santésuisse, the Swiss industry organization for health insurers as well as the vice president of the Health Insurance Ombudsman. He attracted attention for suggesting to close down some hospitals in Switzerland, criticizing cantons for subsidizing outdated hospital structures.

Preceded by Peter Bieri	President of the Swiss Council of States; 2007/2008	Succeeded by Alain Berset
