= Stefan Engler =

Swiss politician

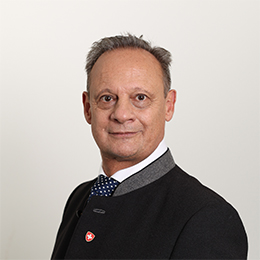

President of the Council of States
- Incumbent
- Assumed office 1 December 2025
- Preceded by: Andrea Caroni

Member of the Council of States of Switzerland
- Incumbent
- Assumed office 5 December 2011
- Constituency: Grisons

Personal details
- Born: May 30, 1960 (age 65) Chur, Switzerland
- Party: The Centre

Stefan Engler (born 30 May 1960) is a Swiss politician who is a member of the Council of States of Switzerland.

== Biography ==
Stefan was born on May 30, 1960, in the Swiss Confederation, in the city of Chur. Prior to his election, he worked as a lawyer. In 2011, he became a member of the Council of States, and on December 1, he was elected its president.
