= Hansheiri Inderkum =

Swiss politician (born 1947)

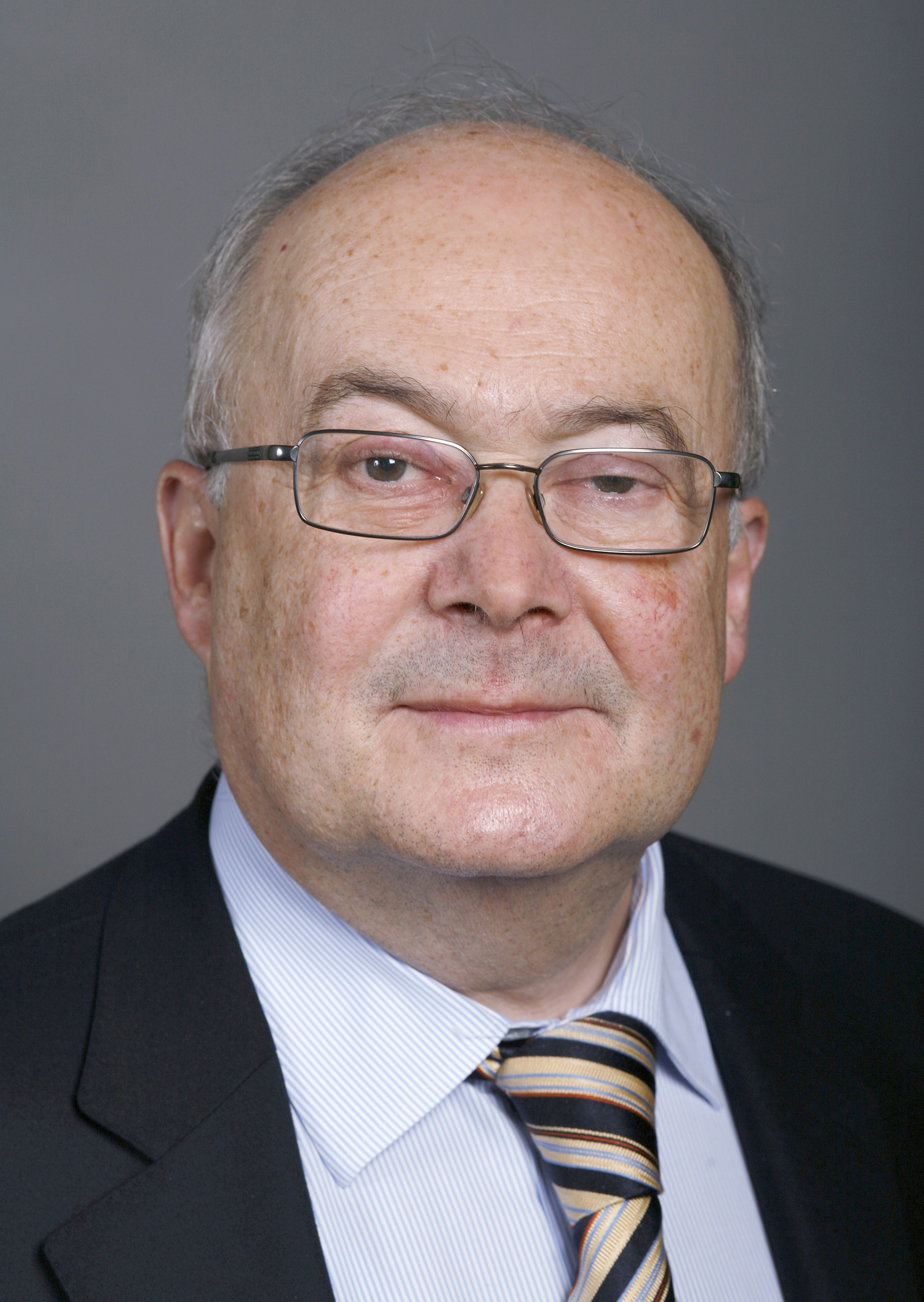

Hansheiri Inderkum (born 9 June 1947 in Altdorf, Switzerland) is a Swiss politician from the Christian Democratic People's Party of Switzerland (CVP). From 1995 to 2011 he represented the canton of Uri in the Council of States.

From 2010 to 2011 Inderkum served as the President of the Council of States.

== Biography ==
A professional lawyer, Inderkum was elected to the council of Altdorf (1979–1981), where he served as mayor (1980–1981). From 1984 to 1996 he worked for the CVP in Uri district, which he presided over in 1992–1993. In the 1995 elections he was elected to the Council of States for the canton of Uri, being re-elected in 1999, 2003, and 2007. Inderkum was also president of the Uri CVP (1982–1989).

Inderkum is married and has two children. He lives in Altdorf and works as a lawyer and notary.

Preceded by Erika Forster-Vannini	President of the Council of States; 2010/2011	Succeeded by Hans Altherr
