= Karin Keller-Sutter =

Swiss Federal Councillor since 2019

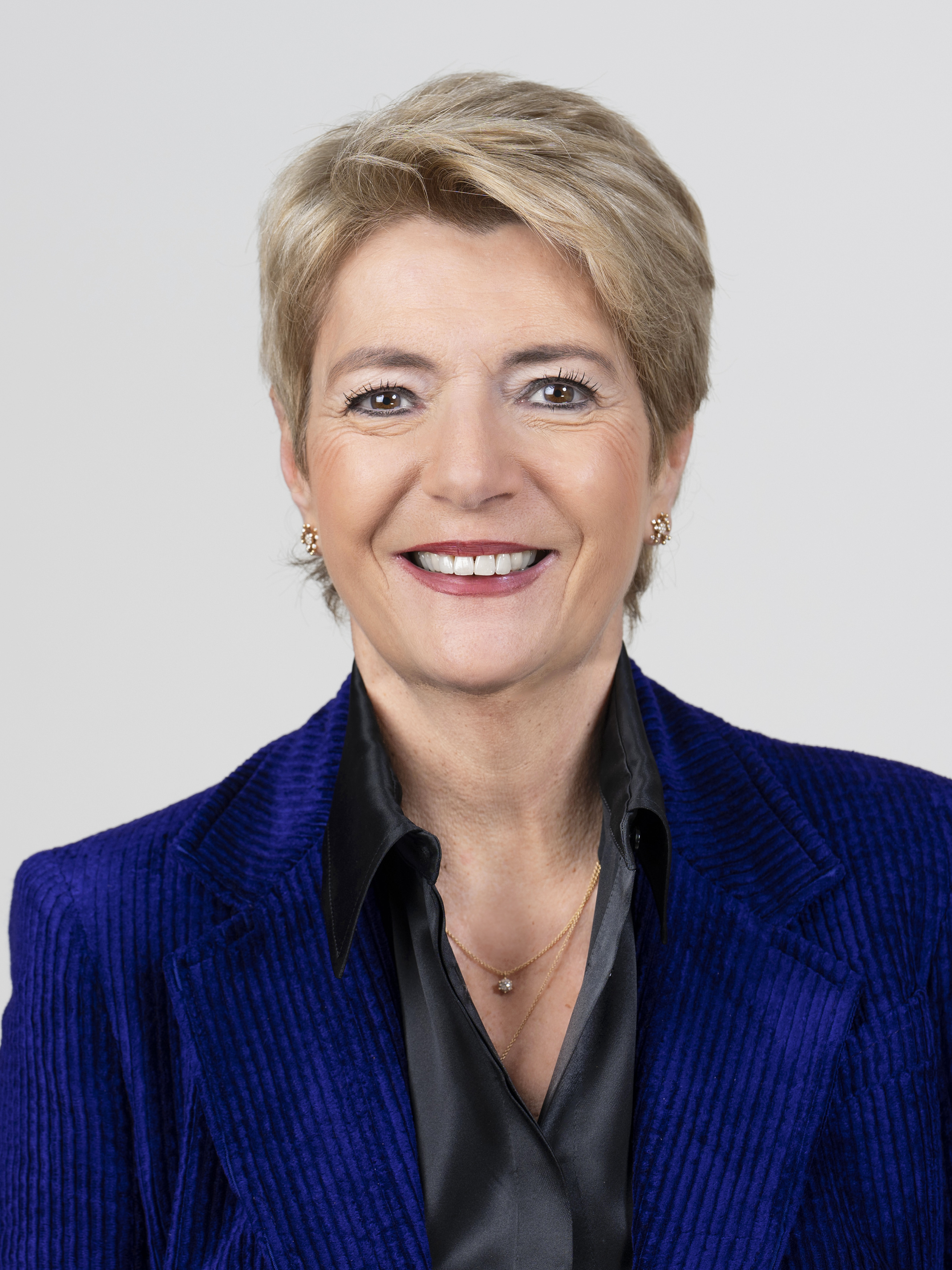
- Official portrait, 2026

President of Switzerland
- In office 1 January 2025 – 31 December 2025
- Vice President: Guy Parmelin
- Preceded by: Viola Amherd
- Succeeded by: Guy Parmelin

Vice President of Switzerland
- In office 1 January 2024 – 31 December 2024
- President: Viola Amherd
- Preceded by: Viola Amherd
- Succeeded by: Guy Parmelin

Swiss Federal Councillor
- Incumbent
- Assumed office 1 January 2019
- Department: Justice and Police (2019–2022); Finance (2023–)
- Preceded by: Johann Schneider-Ammann

President of the Council of States
- In office 27 November 2017 – 26 November 2018
- Preceded by: Ivo Bischofberger
- Succeeded by: Jean-René Fournier

Personal details
- Born: Karin Maria Sutter; 22 December 1963 (age 62) Uzwil, St. Gallen, Switzerland
- Party: Free Democratic Party (until 2009); FDP.The Liberals (since 2009)
- Spouse: Morten Keller (m. 1989)
- Education: Zurich University of Applied Sciences; University of Fribourg
- Website: Federal Department of Finance website

Karin Maria Keller-Sutter (Swiss Standard German: [ˈkaːriːn ˈkɛlər ˈzʊtər]; née Sutter; born 22 December 1963) is a Swiss politician and pedagogist who has served as a member of the Federal Council of Switzerland since 2019 and as President of the Swiss Confederation for 2025.

Keller-Sutter is a member of the Liberals and serves as the head of the Federal Department of Finance. She previously served on the Council of States from 2011 to 2019 and from 2017 to 2018 as president of the Council of States. Before that she held several political roles on the cantonal and municipal level.

In 2023, Keller-Sutter was listed as one of the most influential women worldwide by the Financial Times. She was primarily credited for her engagement with the Acquisition of Credit Suisse by UBS.

== Early life and education ==
Keller-Sutter was born Karin Maria Sutter on 22 December 1963 in Uzwil, Switzerland, the youngest of four children, to Walter Sutter Sr. (died 1989), a butcher-turned-chef, and Rosa Sutter (née Schnyder; born 1927). Her brothers are; Walter "Jesy" Sutter (1950–2025), Rolf Sutter and Bernhard Sutter.

Her paternal family hails from Jonschwil where her parents were the tenants of the restaurant Sonne for many years. Her ancestors were mainly innkeepers and local politicians in St. Gallen. Later, her parents took over the restaurant Ilge in Wil, where she was primarily raised and attended local schools, including Catholic high school before moving to Neuchâtel.

She studied language interpretation at Dolmetscherschule Zürich (now part of the Zurich University of Applied Sciences) followed by studies in political science in London and at the University of Montréal. Later she completed a post-graduate diploma in pedagogy at the University of Fribourg.

== Professional career ==
During her studies, Keller-Sutter worked as an independent translator and conference interpreter. She later became a professor at the vocational school. Keller-Sutter has formerly served as vice president of the board of trustees of the St. Gallen Foundation for International Studies.

== Political career ==
Keller-Sutter joined the FDP in 1987. She undertook a political career as a municipal councillor in Wil between 1992 and 2000. She presided over the municipal assembly in 1997. From 1996 to 2000, she was a deputy of the Kantonsrat of the canton of St. Gallen, while presiding over the local arm of the FDP.

On 12 March 2000, Keller-Sutter was elected to the Regierungsrat of the canton of St. Gallen, where she was appointed to the department for security and justice. She was also vice president of the conference of cantonal directors for justice and police. She presided over the government in 2006–2007.

On 22 September 2010, Keller-Sutter was a candidate for the Swiss Federal Council to succeed Hans-Rudolf Merz but failed to win the election; Johann Schneider-Ammann, a member of the National Council for the canton of Bern since 1999, won the seat instead. On 23 October 2011, she was elected with 65% of the vote to represent the canton of St. Gallen in the Council of States. She served as president of the Council of States in 2017–2018.

On 8 October 2018, Keller-Sutter again announced her candidacy for the Swiss Federal Council, this time for the seat of recently retired Schneider-Ammann, who had defeated her eight years before. On 5 December 2018, she was elected for the Federal Council with 154 votes out of 237, alongside Viola Amherd of the Christian Democratic People's Party (CVP/PDC).

On 1 January 2025, Keller-Sutter was sworn in as president with Guy Parmelin as acting vice president.

In August 2025, Keller-Sutter came under scrutiny after a call with President Donald Trump about trade tariffs resulted in 39% import tariffs for Switzerland.

== Personal life ==
In 1989, Keller-Sutter married Morten Keller (born 1964), a medical doctor. They have no children and reside in Wil, St. Gallen. The couple owned a Jack Russell Terrier named Picasso, after Pablo Picasso. The dog died in 2019.

== See also ==
- List of current heads of state and government
- List of heads of the executive by approval rating

== Notes and references ==
Political offices
| Preceded by Ivo Bischofberger | President of the Council of States; 2017–2018 | Succeeded by Jean-René Fournier |
| Preceded by Johann Schneider-Ammann | Member of the Swiss Federal Council; 2019–present | Incumbent |
| Preceded by Simonetta Sommaruga | Head of the Department of Justice and Police; 2019–2022 | Succeeded by Élisabeth Baume-Schneider |
| Preceded by Ueli Maurer | Head of the Department of Finance; 2023–present | Incumbent |
| Preceded by Viola Amherd | Vice President of Switzerland; 2024 | Succeeded by Guy Parmelin |
| Preceded by Viola Amherd | President of Switzerland; 2025 | Succeeded by Guy Parmelin |
