= Ivo Bischofberger =

Swiss politician and jurist

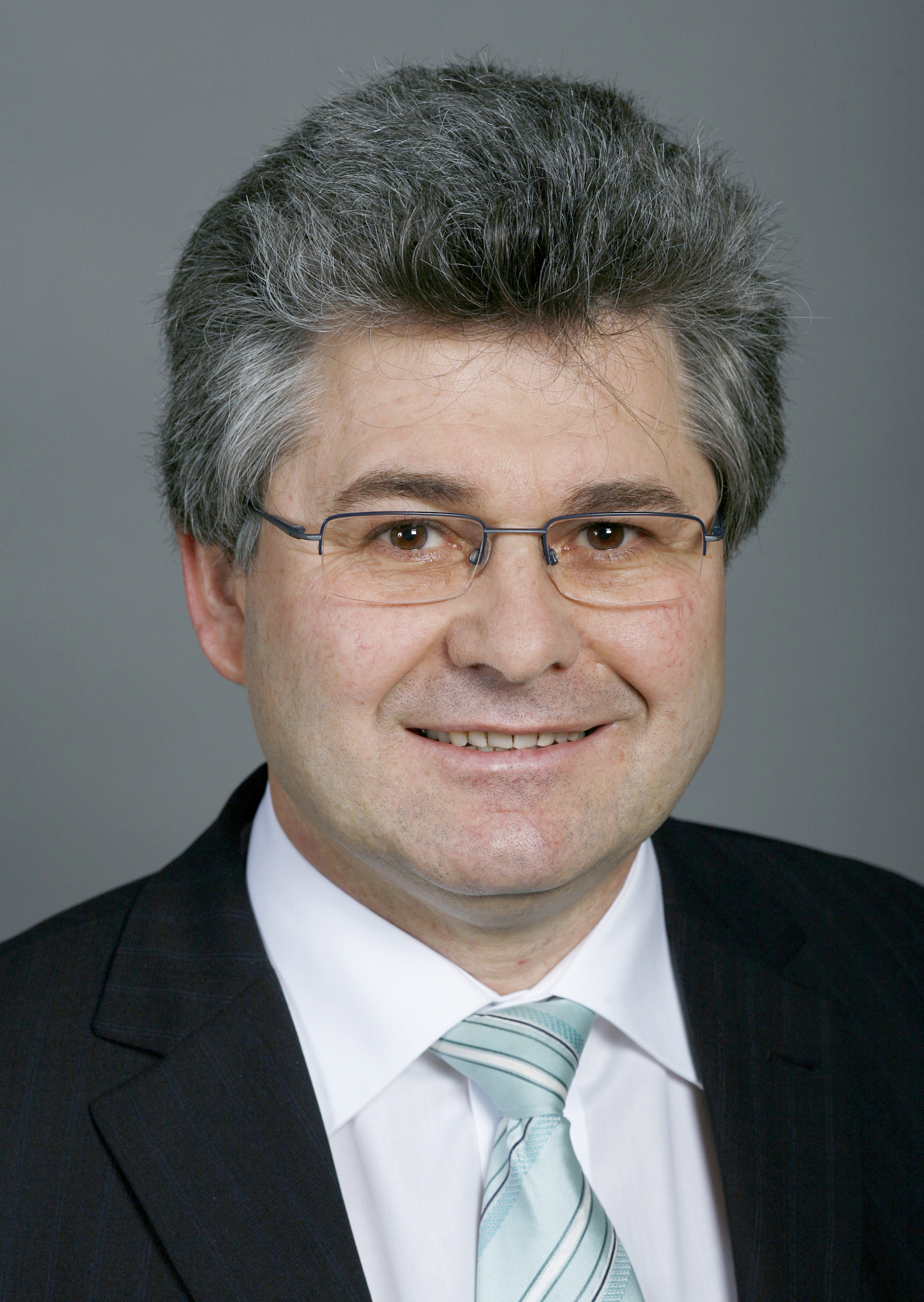

Member of the Council of States
- In office 4 June 2007 – 2 June 2019
- Preceded by: Carlo Schmid-Sutter
- Succeeded by: Daniel Fässler

President of the Council of States
- In office 28 November 2016 – 26 November 2017
- Preceded by: Raphaël Comte
- Succeeded by: Karin Keller-Sutter

Personal details
- Born: 24 February 1958 (age 67); Heiden, Switzerland
- Political party: Christian Democratic People's Party of Switzerland

Ivo Bischofberger is a Swiss politician and jurist. He was a member of the Council of States from 2007 to 2019 and served as the President of the chamber from 2016 to 2017. Prior to his election to the upper chamber, he was a judge at the municipal level from 1986 to 1992 and at the cantonal level in Appenzell Innerrhoden from 1992 to 2008.

== Biography ==
Bischofberger was born on February 24, 1958, in Heiden and was raised in Oberegg. He studied in Zürich and Konstanz before returning to Oberegg to teach.

In 1986, he was elected as a district court judge in Oberegg where he served until 1992. From 1988 to 1992, he was the president of the district court. In 1992, he was elected to serve on the cantonal court. He became the president of the court in 1993 and served in that role until 2008. He was also the chair of the cantonal Christian Democratic Party from 1992 to 1997.

In 2007, with Carlo Schmid-Sutter stepping down as Appenzell Innerrhoden’s sole representative to the Council of States, Bischofberger was elected as his successor. He was elected as the Vice President of the Council in 2015 and President in 2016. He was only the third person from Appenzell Innerrhoden to be elected as president of the Council of States.

After his one-year term expired, Bischofberger continued to serve in the Council on the committees for science, education and culture, social security and public health, and environment, regional planning and energy. In January 2019, he announced that he would not seek another term and would retire.

Bischofberger lives in Oberegg with his wife Margrith.

Preceded by Raphaël Comte	President of the Council of States; 2015/2016	Succeeded by Karin Keller-Sutter
