= Hans Altherr =

Swiss politician (born 1950)

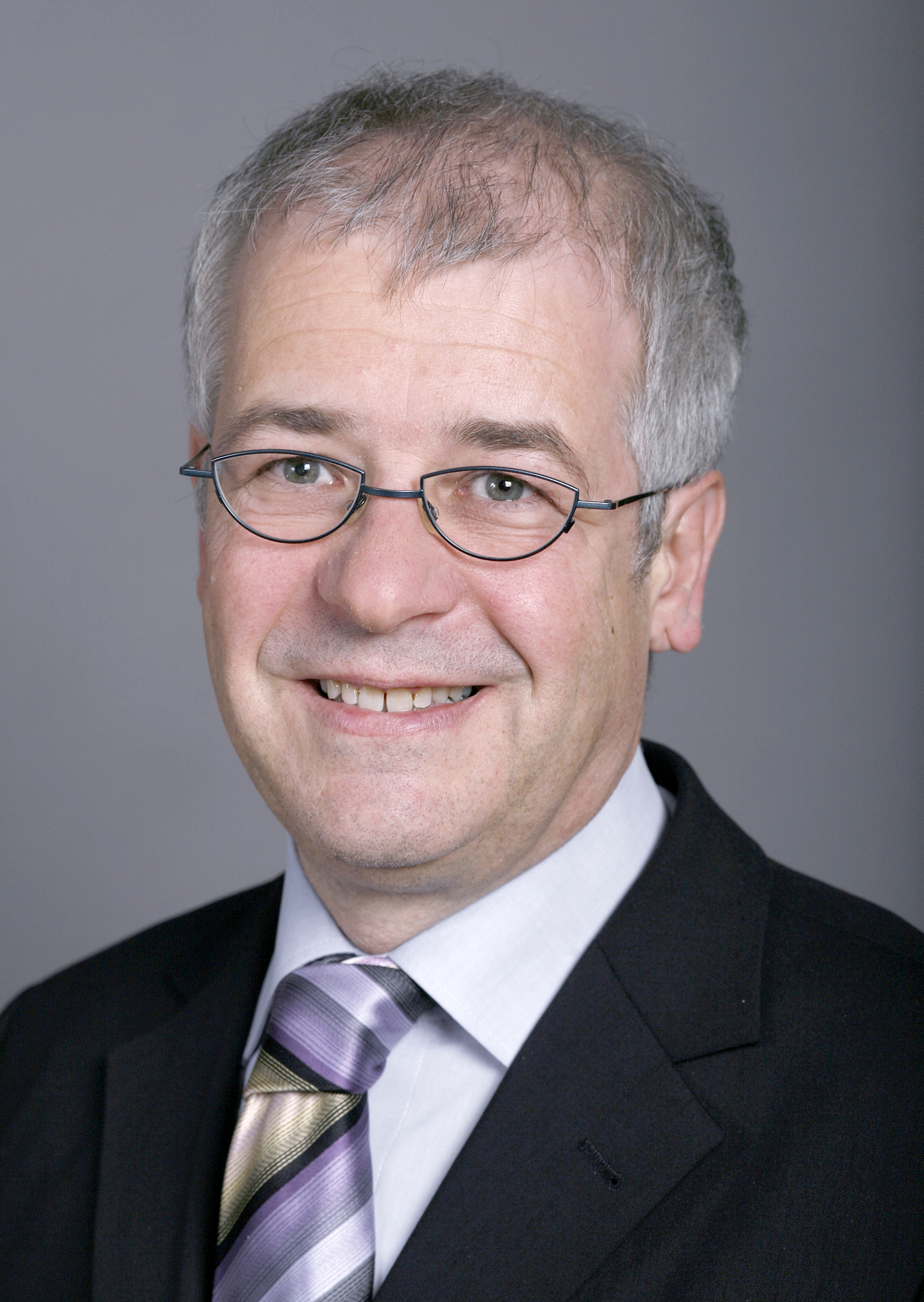

Hans Altherr (born 29 April 1950 in St. Gallen, Switzerland) is a Swiss politician. He is a member of FDP.The Liberals and served as President of the Council of States in 2011 and 2012.

== Biography ==
Altherr studied law at the Universities of Geneva and Zurich and subsequently worked as an independent lawyer and youth attorney for the Canton Appenzell Ausserrhoden. From 1976 to 1993, he was a councillor in Trogen and later a cantonal representative (1989–1998). From 1998 to 2005 he served on the Executive Council, then as Landammann (2000–2003).

In 2004, he was elected to the Senate. There he was on the finance committee, the Committee for Social Security and Health, President of the Defence Commission in the Joint Committee on Finance, in the Drafting Committee and the Delegation to the Parliamentary Assembly of the North Atlantic Treaty. Altherr also served as President of the Council States (2011–2012).

During his presidency, Altherr erected two flags in the Senate hall, a Swiss flag and a flag of his canton Appenzell Ausserrhoden. He established something of a tradition, as this practice was continued by his successors.

In July 2022, he was unanimously elected Chairman of the Forum of Federations.

Altherr is also an entrepreneur, owner of Weiss AG, a diamond and CBN tool manufacturer from Walzenhausen. He is divorced and has three children.

| Preceded by Hansheiri Inderkum | President of the Council of States; 2011/2012 | Succeeded by Filippo Lombardi |
