= List of presidents of the Swiss Council of States =

This is a list of presidents of the Swiss Council of States, one of two houses of the Federal Assembly.

== List of presidents of the Council of States ==
No.	Portrait	Name (Birth–Death)	Term	Party	Canton
1		Jonas Furrer (1805–1861)	1848	Radical Left	Zurich
2		François Briatte (1805–1877)	1848–1850	Radical Left	Vaud
3		Johann Jakob Rüttimann (1813–1876)	1850–1851	Liberal Centre	Zurich
4		Paul Migy (1814–1879)	1851	Radical Left	Bern
5		Karl Kappeler (1816–1888)	1851–1852	Radical Left	Thurgau
(2)		François Briatte (1805–1877)	1852–1853	Radical Left	Vaud
6		Johann Jakob Blumer (1819–1875)	1853–1854	Radical Left	Glarus
7		James Fazy (1794–1878)	1854	Radical Left	Geneva
(5)		Karl Kappeler (1816–1888)	1854–1855	Radical Left	Thurgau
8		Constant Fornerod (1819–1889)	1855	Radical Left	Vaud
9		Samuel Schwarz (1814–1868)	1855–1856	Liberal Centre	Aargau
10		Aimé Humbert-Droz (1819–1900)	1856	Radical Left	Lucerne
11		Jakob Dubs (1822–1879)	1856	Radical Left	Zurich
(2)		François Briatte (1805–1877)	1856–1857	Radical Left	Vaud
12		Johann Baptist Weder (1800–1872)	1857	Radical Left	St. Gallen
13		August Stähelin (1812–1886)	1857–1858	Liberal Centre	Basel-Stadt
14		Niklaus Niggeler (1817–1872)	1858–1859	Radical Left	Bern
(2)		François Briatte (1805–1877)	1859–1860	Radical Left	Vaud
15		Emil Welti (1825–1899)	1860	Radical Left	Aargau
(6)		Johann Jakob Blumer (1819–1875)	1860–1861	Liberal Centre	Glarus
16		Nicolaus Hermann (1818–1888)	1858–1859	Catholic Right	Obwalden
17		Wilhelm Vigier (1823–1886)	1862–1863	Radical Left	Solothurn
18		Eduard Häberlin (1820–1884)	1863	Liberal Centre	Thurgau
19		Karl Schenk (1823–1895)	1863–1864	Radical Left	Bern
20		Jules Roguin (1823–1908)	1864–1865	Liberal Centre	Vaud
(3)		Johann Jakob Rüttimann (1813–1876)	1865–1866	Liberal Centre	Zurich
(15)		Emil Welti (1825–1899)	1866	Radical Left	Aargau
21		Christian Sahli (1825–1897)	1866–1867	Liberal Centre	Bern
(6)		Johann Jakob Blumer (1819–1875)	1867–1868	Liberal Centre	Glarus
22		Arnold Otto Aepli (1816–1897)	1868–1869	Liberal Centre	St. Gallen
23		Eugène Borel (1835–1892)	1869	Radical Left	Neuchâtel
24		Johann Weber (1828–1878)	1869–1870	Radical Left	Bern
25		Abraham Stocker (1825–1887)	1870–1871	Radical Left	Lucerne
26		Augustin Keller (1805–1883)	1871–1872	Radical Left	Aargau
(5)		Karl Kappeler (1816–1888)	1872	Radical Left	Thurgau
(20)		Jules Roguin (1823–1908)	1872–1873	Liberal Centre	Vaud
27		Alois Kopp (1827–1891)	1873–1874	Catholic Right	Lucerne
28		Alphons Koechlin (1821–1893)	1874–1875	Catholic Right	Basel-Stadt
29		Gottlieb Ringier (1837–1929)	1875	Liberal Centre	Aargau
30		Numa Droz (1844–1899)	1875–1876	Radical Left	Neuchâtel
31		Johann Jakob Sulzer (1821–1897)	1876	Democratic Left	Zurich
32		Paul Nagel (1831–1880)	1876–1877	Liberal Centre	Thurgau
33		Karl Hoffmann (1820–1895)	1877–1878	Radical Left	St. Gallen
34		Antoine Vessaz (1833–1911)	1878	Radical Left	Vaud
35		Florian Gengel (1834–1905)	1878–1879	Radical Left	Grisons
36		Karl Rudolf Stehlin (1831–1881)	1879–1880	Liberal Centre	Basel-Stadt
(21)		Christian Sahli (1825–1897)	1880–1881	Liberal Centre	Bern
(5)		Karl Kappeler (1816–1888)	1881	Radical Left	Thurgau
37		Auguste Cornaz (1834–1896)	1881–1882	Radical Left	Neuchâtel
(17)		Wilhelm Vigier (1823–1886)	1882–1883	Liberal Centre	Solothurn
38		Walter Hauser (1837–1902)	1883–1884	Democratic Left	Zurich
39		Martin Birmann (1828–1890)	1884	Liberal Centre	Basel-Landschaft
40		Theodor Wirz (1842–1901)	1884–1885	Catholic Right	Obwalden
41		Esajas Zweifel (1827–1904)	1885–1886	Liberal Centre	Glarus
42		Alphonse Bory (1838–1891)	1886–1887	Radical Left	Vaud
43		Albert Scherb (1839–1908)	1887	Radical Left	Thurgau
44		Adam Herzog (1829–1895)	1887	Catholic Right	Lucerne
45		Alexandre Gavard (1845–1898)	1887–1888	Radical Left	Geneva
46		Heinrich Gustav Schoch (1841–1895)	1888–1889	Democratic Group	Schaffhausen
(33)		Karl Hoffmann (1820–1895)	1889–1890	Radical Left	St. Gallen
47		Gustav Muheim (1851–1917)	1890	Catholic Right	Uri
48		Armin Kellersberger (1838–1905)	1890–1891	Radical Left	Aargau
49		Fritz Göttisheim (1837–1896)	1891–1892	Radical Left	Basel-Stadt
50		Henri Gaspard de Schaller (1828–1900)	1892–1893	Catholic Right	Fribourg
51		Friedrich Eggli (1838–1895)	1893	Radical Left	Bern
52		Oskar Munzinger (1849–1932)	1893–1894	Radical Left	Solothurn
53		Henri de Torrenté (1845–1922)	1894–1895	Catholic Right	Valais
54		Adolphe Jordan (1845–1900)	1895–1896	FDP	Vaud
55		Johann Jakob Hohl (1834–1913)	1896	FDP	Appenzell Ausserrhoden
56		Othmar Blumer (1848–1900)	1896–1897	FDP	Zurich
57		Luzius Raschein (1831–1899)	1897–1898	FDP	Grisons
58		Josef Hildebrand (1855–1935)	1898–1899	Catholic Right	Zug
59		Rinaldo Simen (1849–1910)	1899	FDP	Ticino
60		Arnold Robert (1846–1925)	1899–1900	FDP	Neuchâtel
61		Georg Leumann (1842–1918)	1900–1901	FDP	Thurgau
62		Karl Reichlin (1841–1924)	1901–1902	FDP	Schwyz
63		Casimir von Arx (1852–1931)	1902	FDP	Solothurn
64		Arthur Hoffmann (1857–1927)	1902–1903	FDP	St. Gallen
65		Adrien Lachenal (1849–1918)	1903–1904	FDP	Geneva
66		Emil Isler (1851–1936)	1904–1905	FDP	Aargau
67		Albert Ammann (1860–1929)	1905–1906	FDP	Schaffhausen
68		Adalbert Wirz (1848–1925)	1906–1907	Catholic Right	Obwalden
69		Paul Scherrer (1862–1935)	1907–1908	FDP	Basel-Stadt
70		Adrien Thélin (1842–1922)	1908–1909	FDP	Vaud
71		Paul Emil Usteri (1853–1927)	1909–1910	FDP	Zurich
72		Josef Winiger (1855–1929)	1910–1911	Catholic Right	Lucerne
73		Felix Calonder (1863–1952)	1911–1912	FDP	Grisons
74		Gottfried Kunz (1859–1930)	1912–1913	FDP	Bern
75		Eugène Richard (1843–1925)	1913–1914	FDP	Geneva
76		Johannes Geel (1854–1937)	1914–1915	FDP	St. Gallen
77		Georges Python (1856–1927)	1915–1916	KVP	Fribourg
78		Philippe Mercier (1872–1936)	1916–1917	FDP	Glarus
79		Beat Heinrich Bolli (1858–1938)	1917–1918	FDP	Schaffhausen
80		Friedrich Brügger (1854–1930)	1918–1919	KVP	Grisons
81		Auguste Pettavel (1845–1921)	1919–1920	FDP	Neuchâtel
82		Johannes Baumann (1874–1953)	1920–1921	FDP	Appenzell Ausserrhoden
83		Joseph Räber (1872–1934)	1921–1922	KVP	Schwyz
84		Albert Böhi (1862–1945)	1922–1923	FDP	Thurgau
85		Henri Simon (1868–1932)	1923–1924	FDP	Vaud
86		Josef Andermatt (1871–1942)	1924–1925	KVP	Zug
87		Gottfried Keller (1873–1945)	1925–1926	FDP	Aargau
88		Robert Schöpfer (1869–1941)	1926–1927	FDP	Solothurn
89		Emile Savoy (1877–1935)	1927–1928	KVP	Fribourg
90		Oskar Wettstein (1866–1952)	1928–1929	FDP	Zurich
91		Anton Messmer (1858–1937)	1929–1930	KVP	St. Gallen
92		Paul Charmillot (1865–1932)	1930–1931	FDP	Bern
93		Jakob Sigrist (1869–1935)	1931–1932	KVP	Lucerne
94		Andreas Laely (1864–1955)	1932–1933	FDP	Grisons
95		Antonio Riva (1870–1942)	1933–1934	KVP	Ticino
96		Ernest Béguin (1879–1966)	1934–1935	FDP	Neuchâtel
97		Walter Amstalden (1883–1966)	1935–1936	KVP	Obwalden
98		Edwin Hauser (1864–1949)	1936–1937	DP	Glarus
99		Bernard Weck (1890–1950)	1937–1938	KVP	Fribourg
100		Ernst Löpfe (1878–1970)	1938–1939	FDP	St. Gallen
101		Albert Zust (1874–1952)	1939–1940	KVP	Lucerne
102		Albert Malche (1876–1956)	1940–1941	FDP	Geneva
103		Hans Fricker (1879–1956)	1941–1942	KVP	Aargau
104		Norbert Bosset (1883–1969)	1942–1943	FDP	Vaud
105		Adolf Suter (1882–1947)	1943–1944	KVP	Schwyz
106		Paul Altwegg (1884–1952)	1944–1945	FDP	Thurgau
107		Joseph Piller (1890–1954)	1945–1946	KVP	Fribourg
108		Walter Ackermann (1890–1969)	1946–1947	FDP	Appenzell Ausserrhoden
109		Alphons Iten (1898–1964)	1947–1948	KVP	Zug
110		Gustav Wenk (1884–1956)	1948–1949	SP	Basel-Stadt
111		Paul Haefelin (1889–1972)	1949–1950	FDP	Solothurn
112		Gotthard Egli (1884–1979)	1950–1951	KVP	Lucerne
113		Bixio Bossi (1896–1990)	1951–1952	FDP	Ticino
114		Johann Schmuki (1890–1970)	1952–1953	KVP	St. Gallen
115		Jean-Louis Barrelet (1902–1976)	1953–1954	FDP	Neuchâtel
116		Armin Locher (1897–1967)	1954–1955	KVP	Appenzell Innerrhoden
117		Rudolf Weber (1887–1972)	1955–1956	BGB	Bern
118		Kurt Schoch (1904–1980)	1956–1957	FDP	Schaffhausen
119		Fritz Stähli (1895–1961)	1957–1958	KCVP	Schwyz
120		Augustin Lusser (1896–1973)	1958–1959	KCVP	Zug
121		Gabriel Despland (1901–1983)	1959–1960	FDP	Vaud
122		Antonio Antognini (1893–1972)	1960–1961	KCVP	Ticino
123		Ernst Vaterlaus (1891–1976)	1961–1962	FDP	Zurich
124		Frédéric Fauquex (1898–1976)	1962–1963	LPS	Vaud
125		Ludwig Danioth (1902–1996)	1963–1964	KCVP	Uri
126		Jakob Müller (1895–1967)	1964–1965	FDP	Thurgau
127		Dominik Auf der Maur (1896–1978)	1965–1966	KCVP	Schwyz
128		Willi Rohner (1907–1977)	1966–1967	FDP	St. Gallen
129		Emil Wipfli (1900–1988)	1967–1968	KCVP	Uri
130		Christian Clavadetscher (1897–1980)	1968–1969	FDP	Lucerne
131		Paul Torche (1912–1990)	1969–1970	KCVP	Fribourg
132		Arno Theus (1911–1999)	1970–1971	DP	Grisons
133		Ferruccio Bolla (1911–1984)	1971–1972	FDP	Ticino
134		Marius Lampert (1902–1991)	1972–1973	CVP	Valais
135		Kurt Bächtold (1918–2009)	1973–1974	FDP	Schaffhausen
136		Heinrich Oechslin (1913–1985)	1974–1975	CVP	Schwyz
137		Willi Wenk (1914–1994)	1975–1976	SP	Basel-Stadt
138		Hans Munz (1916–2013)	1976–1977	FDP	Thurgau
139		Robert Reimann (1911–1987)	1977–1978	CVP	Aargau
140		Ulrich Luder (1919–1987)	1978–1979	FDP	Solothurn
141		Josef Ulrich (1917–2007)	1979–1980	CVP	Schwyz
142		Peter Hefti (1922–2012)	1980–1981	FDP	Glarus
143		Jost Dillier (1921–2016)	1981–1982	CVP	Obwalden
144		Pierre Dreyer (1924–2005)	1982	CVP	Fribourg
145		Walter Weber (1917–2008)	1982–1983	SP	Solothurn
146		Édouard Debétaz (1917–1999)	1983–1984	FDP	Vaud
147		Markus Kündig (1931–2011)	1984–1985	CVP	Zug
148		Peter Gerber (1923–2012)	1985–1986	SVP	Bern
149		Alois Dobler (born 1929)	1986–1987	CVP	Schwyz
150		Franco Masoni (born 1928)	1987–1988	FDP	Ticino
151		Hubert Reymond (born 1938)	1988–1989	LPS	Vaud
152		Luregn Mathias Cavelty (born 1935)	1989–1990	CVP	Grisons
153		Max Affolter (1923–1991)	1990–1991	FDP	Solothurn
154		Arthur Hänsenberger (1927–2014)	1991	FDP	Bern
155		Josi Meier (1926–2006)	1991–1992	CVP	Lucerne
156		Otto Piller (born 1942)	1992–1993	SP	Fribourg
157		Riccardo Jagmetti (born 1929)	1993–1994	FDP	Zurich
158		Niklaus Küchler (born 1941)	1994–1995	CVP	Obwalden
159		Otto Schoch (1934–2013)	1995–1996	FDP	Appenzell Ausserrhoden
160		Édouard Delalay (born 1936)	1996–1997	CVP	Valais
161		Ulrich Zimmerli (born 1942)	1997–1998	SVP	Bern
162		René Rhinow (born 1942)	1998–1999	FDP	Basel-Landschaft
163		Carlo Schmid-Sutter (born 1950)	1999–2000	CVP	Appenzell Innerrhoden
164		Françoise Saudan (born 1939)	2000–2001	FDP	Geneva
165		Anton Cottier (1943–2006)	2001–2002	CVP	Fribourg
166		Gian-Reto Plattner (1939–2009)	2002–2003	SP	Basel-Stadt
167		Fritz Schiesser (born 1954)	2003–2004	FDP	Glarus
168		Bruno Frick (born 1953)	2004–2005	CVP	Schwyz
169		Rolf Büttiker (born 1950)	2005–2006	FDP	Solothurn
170		Peter Bieri (born 1952)	2006–2007	CVP	Zug
171		Christoffel Brändli (born 1943)	2007–2008	SVP	Grisons
172		Alain Berset (born 1972)	2008–2009	SP	Fribourg
173		Erika Forster-Vannini (born 1944)	2009–2010	FDP	St. Gallen
174		Hansheiri Inderkum (born 1947)	2010–2011	CVP	Uri
175		Hans Altherr (born 1950)	2011–2012	FDP	Appenzell Ausserrhoden
176		Filippo Lombardi (born 1956)	2012–2013	CVP	Ticino
177		Hannes Germann (born 1956)	2013–2014	SVP	Schaffhausen
178		Claude Hêche (born 1952)	2014–2015	SP	Jura
179		Raphaël Comte (born 1979)	2015–2016	FDP	Neuchâtel
180		Ivo Bischofberger (born 1958)	2016–2017	CVP	Appenzell Innerrhoden
181		Karin Keller-Sutter (born 1963)	2017–2018	FDP	St. Gallen
182		Jean-René Fournier (born 1957)	2018–2019	CVP	Valais
183		Hans Stöckli (born 1952)	2019–2020	SP	Bern
184		Alex Kuprecht (born 1957)	2020–2021	SVP	Schwyz
185		Thomas Hefti (born 1959)	2021–2022	FDP	Glarus
186		Brigitte Häberli-Koller (born 1958)	2022–2023	Centre	Thurgau
187		Eva Herzog (born 1962)	2023–2024	SP	Basel-Stadt
188		Andrea Caroni (born 1980)	2024–2025	FDP	Appenzell Ausserrhoden
189		Stefan Engler (born 1960)	2025–present	Centre	Grisons

== List of vice presidents of the Council of States ==
=== Before 2000 ===
No.	Name	Term	Party	Canton
1	Eugène Richard	1912–1913	FDP	Geneva
2	Johannes Geel	1913–1914	FDP	St. Gallen
3	Georges Python	1914–1915	KVP	Fribourg
4	Philippe Mercier	1915–1916	FDP	Glarus
5	Beat Heinrich Bolli	1916–1917	FDP	Schaffhausen
6	Friedrich Brügger	1917–1918	KVP	Grisons
7	Auguste Pettavel	1918–1919	FDP	Neuchâtel
8	Johannes Baumann	1919–1920	FDP	Appenzell Ausserrhoden
9	Joseph Räber	1920–1921	KVP	Schwyz
10	Albert Böhi	1921–1922	FDP	Thurgau
11	Henri Simon	1922–1923	FDP	Vaud
12	Josef Andermatt	1923–1924	KVP	Zug
13	Gottfried Keller	1924–1925	FDP	Aargau
14	Robert Schöpfer	1925–1926	FDP	Solothurn
15	Emile Savoy	1926–1927	KVP	Fribourg
16	Oskar Wettstein	1927–1928	FDP	Zurich
17	Anton Messmer	1928–1929	KVP	St. Gallen
18	Paul Charmillot	1929–1930	FDP	Bern
19	Jakob Sigrist	1930–1931	KVP	Lucerne
20	Andreas Laely	1931–1932	FDP	Grisons
21	Antonio Riva	1932–1933	KVP	Ticino
22	Ernest Béguin	1933–1934	FDP	Neuchâtel
23	Walter Amstalden	1934–1935	KVP	Obwalden
24	Edwin Hauser	1935–1936	DP	Glarus
25	Bernard Weck	1936–1937	KVP	Fribourg
26	Ernst Löpfe	1937–1938	FDP	St. Gallen
27	Albert Zust	1938–1939	KVP	Lucerne
28	Albert Malche	1939–1940	FDP	Geneva
29	Hans Fricker	1940–1941	KVP	Aargau
30	Norbert Bosset	1941–1942	FDP	Vaud
31	Adolf Suter	1942–1943	KVP	Schwyz
32	Paul Altwegg	1943–1944	FDP	Thurgau
33	Joseph Piller	1944–1945	KVP	Fribourg
34	Walter Ackermann	1945–1946	FDP	Appenzell Ausserrhoden
35	Alphons Iten	1946–1947	KVP	Zug
36	Gustav Wenk	1947–1948	SP	Basel-Stadt
37	Paul Haefelin	1948–1949	FDP	Solothurn
38	Gotthard Egli	1949–1950	KVP	Lucerne
39	Bixio Bossi	1950–1951	FDP	Ticino
40	Johann Schmuki	1951–1952	KVP	St. Gallen
41	Jean-Louis Barrelet	1952–1953	FDP	Neuchâtel
42	Armin Locher	1953–1954	KVP	Appenzell Innerrhoden
43	Rudolf Weber	1954–1955	BGB	Bern
44	Kurt Schoch	1955–1956	FDP	Schaffhausen
45	Fritz Stähli	1956–1957	KCVP	Schwyz
46	Augustin Lusser	1957–1958	KCVP	Zug
47	Gabriel Despland	1958–1959	FDP	Vaud
48	Antonio Antognini	1959–1960	KCVP	Ticino
49	Ernst Vaterlaus	1960–1961	FDP	Zurich
50	Frédéric Fauquex	1961–1962	LPS	Vaud
51	Ludwig Danioth	1962–1963	KCVP	Uri
52	Jakob Müller	1963–1964	FDP	Thurgau
53	Dominik Auf der Maur	1964–1965	KCVP	Schwyz
54	Willi Rohner	1965–1966	FDP	St. Gallen
55	Emil Wipfli	1966–1967	KCVP	Uri
56	Christian Clavadetscher	1967–1968	FDP	Lucerne
57	Arno Theus	1968–1970	DP	Grisons
58	Ferruccio Bolla	1970–1971	FDP	Ticino
59	Marius Lampert	1971–1972	CVP	Valais
60	Kurt Bächtold	1972–1973	FDP	Schaffhausen
61	Heinrich Oechslin	1973–1974	CVP	Schwyz
62	Willi Wenk	1974–1975	SP	Basel-Stadt
63	Hans Munz	1975–1976	FDP	Thurgau
64	Robert Reimann	1976–1977	CVP	Aargau
65	Ulrich Luder	1977–1978	FDP	Solothurn
66	Josef Ulrich	1978–1979	CVP	Schwyz
67	Peter Hefti	1979–1980	FDP	Glarus
68	Jost Dillier	1980–1981	CVP	Obwalden
69	Walter Weber	1981–1982	SP	Solothurn
70	Édouard Debétaz	1982–1983	FDP	Vaud
71	Markus Kündig	1983–1984	CVP	Zug
72	Peter Gerber	1984–1985	SVP	Bern
73	Alois Dobler	1985–1986	CVP	Schwyz
74	Franco Masoni	1986–1987	FDP	Ticino
75	Hubert Reymond	1987–1988	LPS	Vaud
76	Luregn Mathias Cavelty	1988–1989	CVP	Grisons
77	Max Affolter	1989–1990	FDP	Solothurn
78	Jakob Schönenberger	1990–1991	CVP	St. Gallen
79	Otto Piller	1991–1992	SP	Fribourg
80	Riccardo Jagmetti	1992–1993	FDP	Zurich
81	Niklaus Küchler	1993–1994	CVP	Obwalden
82	Otto Schoch	1994–1995	FDP	Appenzell Ausserrhoden
83	Édouard Delalay	1995–1996	CVP	Valais
84	Ulrich Zimmerli	1996–1997	SVP	Bern
85	Andreas Iten	1997–1998	FDP	Zug
86	Carlo Schmid-Sutter	1998–1999	CVP	Appenzell Innerrhoden
87	Françoise Saudan	1999–2000	FDP	Geneva

=== Since 2000 ===
First Vice President				Second Vice President				Term
No.	Name	Party	Canton	No.	Name	Party	Canton	Term
88	Anton Cottier	CVP	FR	89	Gian-Reto Plattner	SP	BS	2000–2001
(89)	Gian-Reto Plattner	SP	BS	90	Fritz Schiesser	FDP	GL	2001–2002
(90)	Fritz Schiesser	FDP	GL	91	Bruno Frick	CVP	SZ	2002–2003
(91)	Bruno Frick	CVP	SZ	92	Rolf Büttiker	FDP	SO	2003–2004
(92)	Rolf Büttiker	FDP	SO	93	Peter Bieri	CVP	ZG	2004–2005
(93)	Peter Bieri	CVP	ZG	94	Christoffel Brändli	SVP	GR	2005–2006
(94)	Christoffel Brändli	SVP	GR	95	Alain Berset	SP	FR	2006–2007
(95)	Alain Berset	SP	FR	96	Erika Forster-Vannini	FDP	SG	2007–2008
(96)	Erika Forster-Vannini	FDP	SG	97	Hansheiri Inderkum	CVP	UR	2008–2009
(97)	Hansheiri Inderkum	CVP	UR	98	Hans Altherr	FDP	AR	2009–2010
(98)	Hans Altherr	FDP	AR	99	Filippo Lombardi	CVP	TI	2010–2011
(99)	Filippo Lombardi	CVP	TI	100	Hannes Germann	SVP	SH	2011–2012
(100)	Hannes Germann	SVP	SH	101	Claude Hêche	SP	JU	2012–2013
(101)	Claude Hêche	SP	JU	102	Raphaël Comte	FDP	NE	2013–2014
(102)	Raphaël Comte	FDP	NE	103	Ivo Bischofberger	CVP	AI	2014–2015
(103)	Ivo Bischofberger	CVP	AI	104	Karin Keller-Sutter	FDP	SG	2015–2016
(104)	Karin Keller-Sutter	FDP	SG	105	Jean-René Fournier	CVP	VS	2016–2017
(105)	Jean-René Fournier	CVP	VS	106	Géraldine Savary	SP	VD	2017–2018
107	Hans Stöckli	SP	BE	108	Alex Kuprecht	SVP	SZ	2018–2019
(108)	Alex Kuprecht	SVP	SZ	109	Thomas Hefti	FDP	GL	2019–2020
(109)	Thomas Hefti	FDP	GL	110	Brigitte Häberli-Koller	CVP	TG	2020–2021
(110)	Brigitte Häberli-Koller	Centre	TG	111	Élisabeth Baume-Schneider	SP	JU	2021–2022
112	Eva Herzog	SP	BS	113	Lisa Mazzone	SVP	GE	2022–2023
114	Andrea Caroni	FDP	AR	115	Stefan Engler	Centre	GR	2023–2024
(115)	Stefan Engler	Centre	GR	116	Werner Salzmann	SVP	BE	2024–2025
(116)	Werner Salzmann	SVP	BE	117	Mathilde Crevoisier Crelier	SP	JU	2025–

== See also ==
- Members of the Swiss Council of States
- Presidents of the Swiss National Council
