= Peter Bieri (politician) =

Swiss politician (born 1952)

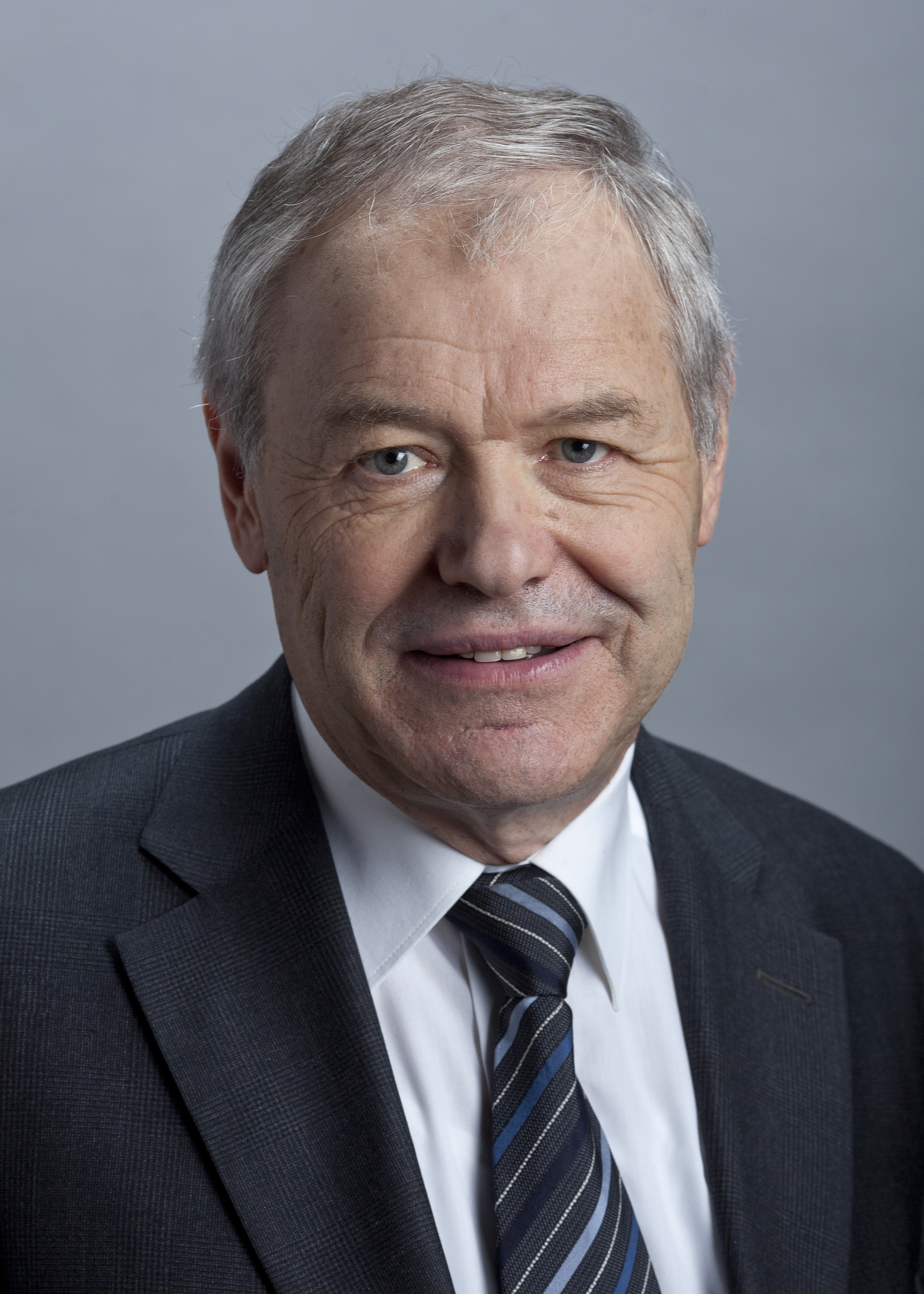
Peter Bieri (2011)

Peter Bieri (born 21 June 1952) is a Swiss politician. He was a member of the Council of States and served as the President of the Swiss Council of States for the 2006–07 session. He is a member of the Christian Democratic People's Party (CVP/PDC).

Bieri was born 1952 in Winterthur. He is married and father of four. From 1987 to 1994, he was member of the council of the municipality of Hünenberg.

== Works ==
- Bieri, Peter: Produktionstechnische und wirtschaftliche Untersuchungen über den Futteraufwand bei Milchkühen während der Laktation, Zürich, ETH, thesis 1982

Preceded by Rolf Büttiker	President of the Swiss Council of States; 2006/2007	Succeeded by Christoffel Brändli
