= Filippo Lombardi (politician) =

Swiss politician

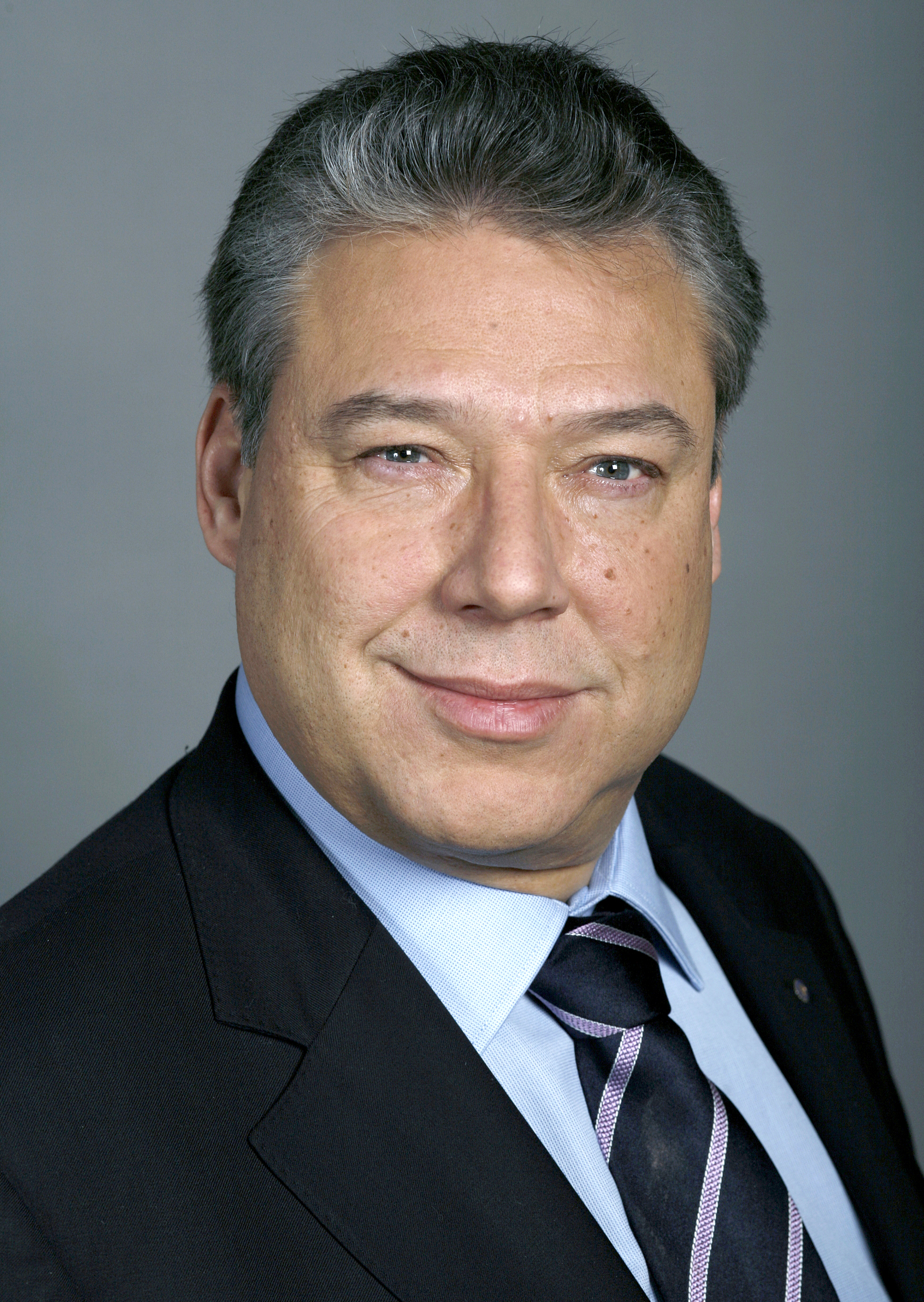
Filippo Lombardi in 2007

Filippo Lombardi (born 29 May 1956) is a Swiss politician. He represented Ticino in the Council of States from 2014 to 2019 and served as the President of the Council of States from 2012 to 2013. He is a member of the Christian Democratic People's Party.

Preceded by Hans Altherr	President of the Council of States; 2012/2013	Succeeded by Hannes Germann
