= 1872 Swiss federal election =

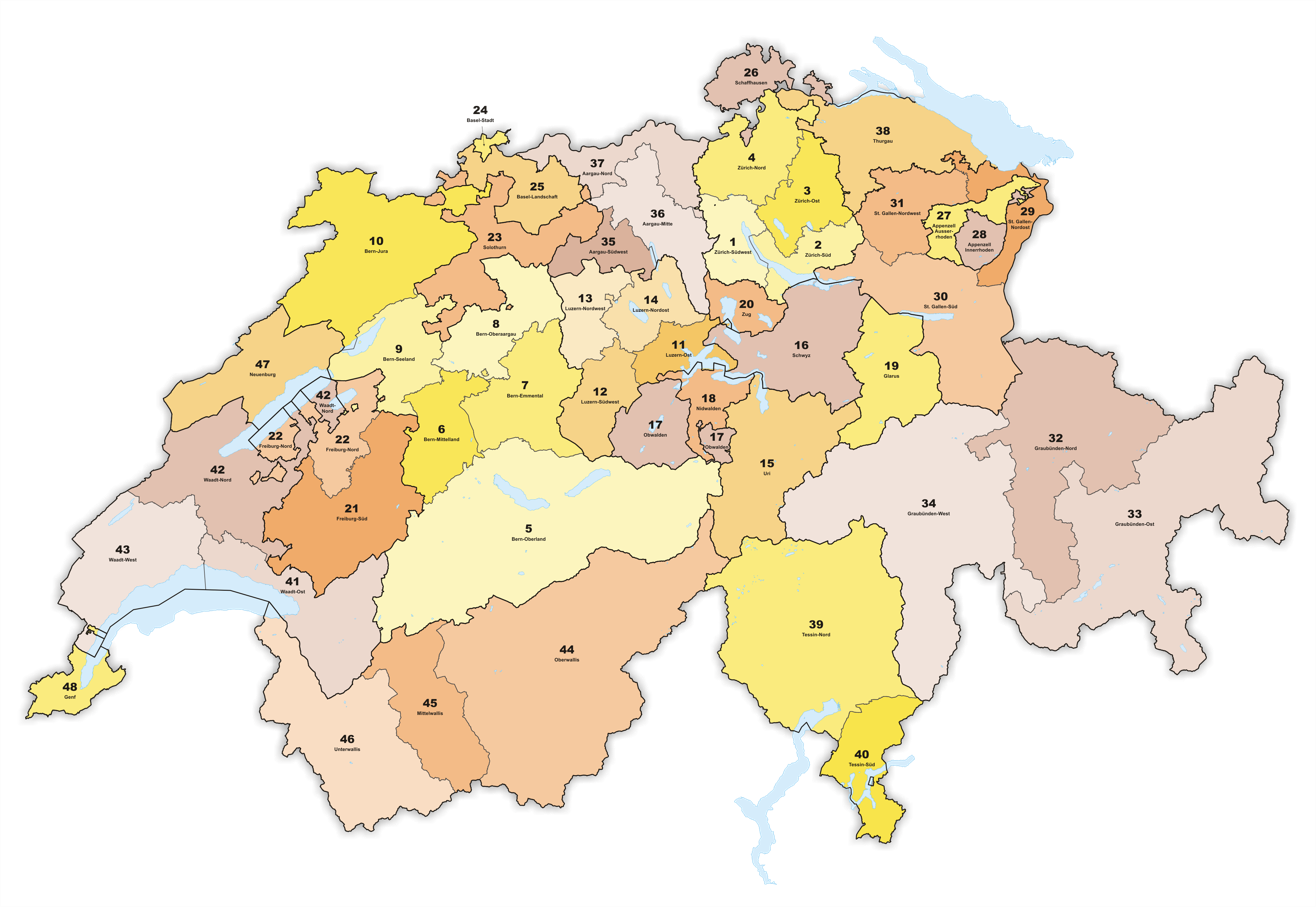
The 48 electoral districts

Federal elections were held in Switzerland on 27 October 1872. The Radical Left remained the largest group in the National Council.

== Electoral system ==
The 135 members of the National Council were elected in 48 single- and multi-member constituencies using a three-round system. Candidates had to receive a majority in the first or second round to be elected; if it went to a third round, only a plurality was required. Voters could cast as many votes as there were seats in their constituency. For the first time the National Council was directly-elected in its entirety; in previous elections the cantons of Appenzell Innerrhoden, Appenzell Ausserrhoden, Glarus, Nidwalden, Obwalden and Uri had their National Council members elected by the Landsgemeinde. However, an electoral law passed in 1872 required secret voting for federal elections and a polling station to be opened in every municipality in order to avoid manipulation in the open Landsgemeinde. The electoral law also changed the calculation of a candidate's majority from including valid and invalid votes to only valid votes.

There was one seat for every 20,000 citizens, with seats allocated to cantons in proportion to their population. Following the 1869 elections the number of seats was increased from 128 to 137, with the members now elected from 48 constituencies, increased from 47. Bern gained two seats, whilst Fribourg, Neuchâtel, Solothurn, St Gallen and Zürich gained one each.

== Results ==
=== National Council ===
Voter turnout was highest in the Canton of Uri at 91.3% (higher than the 75.2% who voted in Schaffhausen, where voting was compulsory) and lowest in Schwyz at 39.8%.

Party	Votes	%	Seats	+/–
Radical Left		35.2	60	+4
Liberal Centre		25.6	30	+7
Catholic Right		21.1	27	–4
Democratic Left		12.5	15	0
Evangelical Right		4.1	3	0
Independents		1.5	0	0
Total			135	+7
Total votes	392,843	–		
Registered voters/turnout	632,901	62.07		
Source: BFS

==== By constituency ====
Constituency	Seats	Party	Seats won	Elected members
Zürich 1	5	Liberal Centre	5	Alfred Escher; Johann Jakob Widmer; Melchior Römer; Heinrich Studer; Wilhelm Hertenstein
Zürich 2	3	Democratic Left	2	Johann Jakob Keller; Walter Hauser
Zürich 2	3	Liberal Centre	1	Johann Heinrich Fierz
Zürich 3	3	Democratic Left	3	Gottlieb Ziegler; Hans Rudolf Zangger; Salomon Bleuler
Zürich 4	3	Democratic Left	3	Johann Jakob Scherer; Jakob Fehr; Friedrich Scheuchzer
Bern 5	5	Radical Left	5	Carl Samuel Zyro; Paul Cérésole; Jakob Scherz; Friedrich Seiler; Wilhelm Teuscher
Bern 6	4	Evangelical Right	2	Otto von Büren; August von Gonzenbach
Bern 6	4	Radical Left	2	Rudolf Brunner; Friedrich von Werdt
Bern 7	4	Radical Left	4	Karl Schenk; Karl Karrer; Gottlieb Riem; Gottfried Joost
Bern 8	4	Radical Left	4	Johann Bützberger; Albert Friedrich Born; Alexander Bucher; Walther Munzinger
Bern 9	3	Radical Left	3	Eduard Marti; Jakob Stämpfli; Friedrich Eggli
Bern 10	5	Radical Left	5	Pierre Jolissaint; Niklaus Kaiser; Paul Migy; Auguste-Adolphe Klaye; Hippolyte Paulet
Lucerne 11	2	Liberal Centre	2	Josef Martin Knüsel; Joseph Zingg
Lucerne 12	1	Catholic Right	1	Josef Zemp
Lucerne 13	2	Catholic Right	2	Vinzenz Fischer; Jost Peyer
Lucerne 14	2	Catholic Right	2	Franz Xaver Beck; Philipp Anton von Segesser
Uri 15	1	Catholic Right	1	Josef Arnold
Schwyz 16	2	Catholic Right	2	Fridolin Holdener; Johann Michael Stählin
Obwalden 17	1	Catholic Right	1	Alois Reinert
Nidwalden 18	1	Catholic Right	1	Walter Zelger
Glarus 19	2	Liberal Centre	1	Joachim Heer
Glarus 19	2	Radical Left	1	Niklaus Tschudi
Zug 20	1	Catholic Right	1	Alois Schwerzmann
Fribourg 21	3	Catholic Right	3	Laurent Chaney; Louis de Weck; Karl Vissaula
Fribourg 22	3	Catholic Right	3	Joseph Jaquet; Louis Grand; Louis de Wuilleret
Solothurn 23	4	Radical Left	4	Benedikt von Arx; Josef Bläsi; Simon Kaiser; Albert Brosi
Basel-Stadt 24	2	Radical Left	1	Wilhelm Klein
Basel-Stadt 24	2	Liberal Centre	1	Johann Jakob Stehlin
Basel-Landschaft 25	3	Radical Left	2	Emanuel Löw; Jakob Bernhard Graf
Basel-Landschaft 25	3	Democratic Left	1	Emil Frey
Schaffhausen 26	2	Liberal Centre	1	Friedrich Peyer im Hof
Schaffhausen 26	2	Democratic Left	1	Wilhelm Joos
Appenzell Ausserrhoden 27	2	Liberal Centre	1	Adolf Friedrich Zürcher
Appenzell Ausserrhoden 27	2	Radical Left	1	Johannes Hohl
Appenzell Innerhoden 28	1	Catholic Right	1	Alois Broger
St. Gallen 29	4	Liberal Centre	2	Arnold Otto Aepli; Daniel Wirth-Sand
St. Gallen 29	4	Democratic Left	2	Johann Ulrich Hafner; Gustav Adolf Saxer
St. Gallen 30	3	Radical Left	2	Johannes Geel; Johann Baptist Gaudy
St. Gallen 30	3	Liberal Centre	1	Rudolf Hilty
St. Gallen 31	3	Liberal Centre	1	Georg Friedrich Anderegg
St. Gallen 31	3	Catholic Right	1	Johann Fridolin Müller
St. Gallen 31	3	Radical Left	1	Johann M. Hungerbühler
Grisons 32	2	Liberal Centre	1	Simeon Bavier
Grisons 32	2	Evangelical Right	1	Hermann Jakob von Sprecher
Grisons 33	2	Liberal Centre	1	Johann Anton Casparis Sr.
Grisons 33	2	Catholic Right	1	Johann R. von Toggenburg
Grisons 34	1	Radical Left	1	Johann Albert Romedi
Aargau 35	3	Liberal Centre	2	Carl Feer-Herzog; Emil Welti
Aargau 35	3	Radical Left	1	Arnold Künzli
Aargau 36	4	Radical Left	3	Peter Suter; Theodor Haller; Plazid Weissenbach
Aargau 36	4	Liberal Centre	1	Hans Weber
Aargau 37	3	Catholic Right	2	Arnold Münch; Karl von Schmid
Aargau 37	3	Liberal Centre	1	K. F. S. Fahrländer
Thurgau 38	5	Democratic Left	4	Adolf Deucher; Fridolin Anderwert; Jakob Albert Scherb; Severin Stoffel
Thurgau 38	5	Liberal Centre	1	Johann Messmer
Ticino 39	3	Radical Left	2	Carlo Battaglini; Costantino Bernasconi
Ticino 39	3	Catholic Right	1	Massimiliano Magatti
Ticino 40	3	Catholic Right	2	Michele Pedrazzini; Carlo Vonmentlen
Ticino 40	3	Radical Left	1	Giovanni Jauch
Vaud 41	4	Liberal Centre	2	Charles Cossy; Jakob Dubs
Vaud 41	4	Radical Left	2	Louis Ruchonnet; Jules Eytel
Vaud 42	4	Liberal Centre	2	Jean-Louis Demiéville; Pierre-Isaac Joly
Vaud 42	4	Radical Left	2	Georges-Louis Contesse; Paul Wulliémoz
Vaud 43	3	Radical Left	3	Louis-Henri Delarageaz; Henri Reymond; Charles Baud
Valais 44	2	Catholic Right	2	Hans Anton von Roten; Ignaz Zenruffinen
Valais 45	1	Catholic Right	1	Maurice Evéquoz
Valais 46	2	Catholic Right	1	Louis Gross
Valais 46	2	Radical Left	1	Louis Barman
Neuchâtel 47	5	Radical Left	5	Jules Philippin; Zélim Perret; Édouard Desor; Fritz Berthoud; Louis Constant Lambelet
Geneva 48	4	Radical Left	4	Antoine Carteret; Jean-Jacques Challet-Venel; Gustave-Jules Pictet; Moïse Vautier
Source: Gruner

==== Election re-runs ====
Constituency	Seats	Date of re-run	Party	Seats won	Elected members
Ticino 40	3	6 April 1873	Catholic Right	2	Michele Pedrazzini; Carlo Vonmentlen
Ticino 40	3	6 April 1873	Radical Left	1	Giovanni Jauch
Ticino 39	3	19 October 1873 (first round); 2 November 1873 (second round)	Radical Left	2	Carlo Battaglini; Emilio Censi
Ticino 39	3	19 October 1873 (first round); 2 November 1873 (second round)	Catholic Right	1	Massimiliano Magatti
Ticino 40	3	19 October 1873 (first round); 2 November 1873 (second round)	Catholic Right	3	Michele Pedrazzini; Carlo Vonmentlen; Agostino Gatti
Source: Gruner

=== Council of States ===
Party	Seats	+/–
Catholic Right	15	+1
Liberal Centre	10	–2
Radical Left	11	0
Democratic Left	3	–1
Evangelical Right	0	0
Independents	4	+1
Vacant	1	+1
Total	44	0
Source: The Federal Assembly
