= List of members of the Federal Assembly from the Canton of Luzern =

Coat of Arms

This is a list of members of both houses of the Federal Assembly from the Canton of Lucerne.

== Members of the Council of States ==
| Councillor (Party) | Election | Councillor (Party) |
|---|---|---|
| Ludwig Plazid Meyer; Liberal Party; 1848–1848 | Appointed | Jost Jos. Nager; Liberal Party; 1848–1849 |
| Josef Meyer; Liberal Party; 1849–1849 | Appointed | Jost Jos. Nager; Liberal Party; 1848–1849 |
| Josef X. Leod. Franz Schumacher; Liberal Party; 1850–1853 | Appointed | Johann Baptist Sidler; Liberal Party; 1850–1852 |
| Anton Hunkeler; Liberal Party; 1853–1855 | Appointed | Johann Baptist Sidler; Liberal Party; 1850–1852 |
| Anton Hunkeler; Liberal Party; 1853–1855 | Appointed | Jost Jos. Nager; Liberal Party; 1854–1857 |
| Renward Meyer; Liberal Party; 1856–1867 | Appointed | Jost Jos. Nager; Liberal Party; 1854–1857 |
| Renward Meyer; Liberal Party; 1856–1867 | Appointed | Johann Winkler; Liberal Party; 1858–1859 |
| Renward Meyer; Liberal Party; 1856–1867 | Appointed | Jost Weber; Conservateur puis libéral 1860–1867 |
| Abraham Stocker; Liberal Party; 1867–1871 | Appointed | |
| Abraham Stocker; Liberal Party; 1867–1871 | Appointed | Jost Weber; Conservateur puis libéral 1868–1890 |
| Abraham Stocker; Liberal Party; 1867–1871 | Appointed | Josef Zingg; Liberal Party; 1870–1871 |
| Alois Kopp; Conservative; 1871–1879 | Appointed | Joseph Zemp; Conservative; 1871–1872 |
| Alois Kopp; Conservative; 1871–1879 | Appointed | Adam Herzog; Conservative; 1872–1895 |
| Vinzenz Fischer; Conservative; 1879–1885 | Appointed | Adam Herzog; Conservative; 1872–1895 |
| Jules Schnyder; Conservative; 1885–1886 | Appointed | Adam Herzog; Conservative; 1872–1895 |
| Vinzenz Fischer; Conservative; 1886–1889 | Appointed | Adam Herzog; Conservative; 1872–1895 |
| Jakob Schmid; Conservative; 1889–1897 | Appointed | Adam Herzog; Conservative; 1872–1895 |
| Jakob Schmid; Conservative; 1889–1897 | Appointed | Edmund von Schumacher; Conservative; 1895–1908 |
| Josef Winiger; Conservative; 1897–1929 | Appointed | Edmund von Schumacher; Conservative; 1895–1908 |
| Josef Winiger; Conservative; 1897–1929 | Appointed | Josef Dürig; Conservative; 1908–1920 |
| Josef Winiger; Conservative; 1897–1929 | Appointed | Jakob Sigrist; Conservative; 1920–1935 |
| Albert Zust; Conservative; 1929–1943 | Appointed | Jakob Sigrist; Conservative; 1920–1935 |
| Albert Zust; Conservative; 1929–1943 | 1931 | Jakob Sigrist; Conservative; 1920–1935 |
| Albert Zust; Conservative; 1929–1943 | 1935 | Gotthard Egli; Conservative; 1935–1955 |
| Albert Zust; Conservative; 1929–1943 | 1939 | Gotthard Egli; Conservative; 1935–1955 |
| Franz Karl Zust; Conservative; 1943–1955 | 1943 | Gotthard Egli; Conservative; 1935–1955 |
| Franz Karl Zust; Conservative; 1943–1955 | 1947 | Gotthard Egli; Conservative; 1935–1955 |
| Franz Karl Zust; Conservative; 1943–1955 | 1951 | Gotthard Egli; Conservative; 1935–1955 |
| Christian Clavadetscher; Free Democratic Party; 1955–1971 | 1955 | Peter Müller; Conservative; 1955–1965 |
| Christian Clavadetscher; Free Democratic Party; 1955–1971 | 1959 | Peter Müller; Conservative; 1955–1965 |
| Christian Clavadetscher; Free Democratic Party; 1955–1971 | 1963 | Peter Müller; Conservative; 1955–1965 |
| Christian Clavadetscher; Free Democratic Party; 1955–1971 | 1966 | Franz-Xaver Leu; Christian Social Conservative Party; 1966–1975 |
| Christian Clavadetscher; Free Democratic Party; 1955–1971 | 1967 | Franz-Xaver Leu; Christian Social Conservative Party; 1966–1975 |
| Peter Knüsel; Free Democratic Party; 1971–1987 | 1971 | Franz-Xaver Leu; Christian Social Conservative Party; 1966–1975 |
| Peter Knüsel; Free Democratic Party; 1971–1987 | 1975 | Alphons Egli; Christian Democratic People's Party; 1975–1982 |
| Peter Knüsel; Free Democratic Party; 1971–1987 | 1979 | Alphons Egli; Christian Democratic People's Party; 1975–1982 |
| Peter Knüsel; Free Democratic Party; 1971–1987 | 1983 | Josi J. Meier; Christian Democratic People's Party; 1983–1995 |
| Kaspar Villiger; Free Democratic Party; 1987–1989 | 1987 | Josi J. Meier; Christian Democratic People's Party; 1983–1995 |
| Robert Bühler; Free Democratic Party; 1989–1995 | 1989 | Josi J. Meier; Christian Democratic People's Party; 1983–1995 |
| Robert Bühler; Free Democratic Party; 1989–1995 | 1991 | Josi J. Meier; Christian Democratic People's Party; 1983–1995 |
| Helen Leumann-Würsch; Free Democratic Party; 1995–2009; FDP.The Liberals; 2009–2011 | 1995 | Franz Wicki; Christian Democratic People's Party; 1995–2007 |
| Helen Leumann-Würsch; Free Democratic Party; 1995–2009; FDP.The Liberals; 2009–2011 | 1999 | Franz Wicki; Christian Democratic People's Party; 1995–2007 |
| Helen Leumann-Würsch; Free Democratic Party; 1995–2009; FDP.The Liberals; 2009–2011 | 2003 | Franz Wicki; Christian Democratic People's Party; 1995–2007 |
| Helen Leumann-Würsch; Free Democratic Party; 1995–2009; FDP.The Liberals; 2009–2011 | 2007 | Konrad Graber; Christian Democratic People's Party; 2007–2019 |
| Helen Leumann-Würsch; Free Democratic Party; 1995–2009; FDP.The Liberals; 2009–2011 | 2009 | Konrad Graber; Christian Democratic People's Party; 2007–2019 |
| Georges Theiler; FDP.The Liberals; 2011–2015 | 2011 | Konrad Graber; Christian Democratic People's Party; 2007–2019 |
| Damian Müller; FDP.The Liberals; 2015–present | 2015 | Konrad Graber; Christian Democratic People's Party; 2007–2019 |
| Damian Müller; FDP.The Liberals; 2015–present | 2019 | Andrea Gmür-Schönenberger; Christian Democratic People's Party; 2019-2023; The Centre; 2023–present |
| Damian Müller; FDP.The Liberals; 2015–present | 2023 | Andrea Gmür-Schönenberger; Christian Democratic People's Party; 2019-2023; The Centre; 2023–present |

== Members of the National Council ==
| Election | Councillor (Party) | Councillor (Party) | Councillor (Party) | Councillor (Party) | Councillor (Party) | Councillor (Party) | Councillor (Party) | Councillor (Party) | Councillor (Party) | Councillor (Party) |
|---|---|---|---|---|---|---|---|---|---|---|
| 1848 | Johann Jak. Heller (Liberal) | Jakob Kopp (Liberal) | Kasimir Pfyffer (Liberal) | Anton Schnyder (Liberal) | Jakob Robert Steiger (Liberal) | Philipp Anton von Segesser (Conservative) | 6 seats 1848–1851 | | | |
| 1850 | Vinzenz Huber (Liberal) | Jakob Kopp (Liberal) | Kasimir Pfyffer (Liberal) | Anton Schnyder (Liberal) | Jakob Robert Steiger (Liberal) | Philipp Anton von Segesser (Conservative) | 6 seats 1848–1851 | | | |
| 1851 | Josef Sigm. Bühler (Liberal) | Jakob Kopp (Liberal) | Kasimir Pfyffer (Liberal) | Anton Schnyder (Liberal) | Jakob Robert Steiger (Liberal) | Philipp Anton von Segesser (Conservative) | Alois Kopp (Conservative) | 7 seat 1851–1911 | | |
| 1852 | Josef Sigm. Bühler (Liberal) | Jakob Kopp (Liberal) | Kasimir Pfyffer (Liberal) | Anton Schnyder (Liberal) | Vinzenz Huber (Liberal) | Philipp Anton von Segesser (Conservative) | Alois Kopp (Conservative) | 7 seat 1851–1911 | | |
| 1854 | Josef Sigm. Bühler (Liberal) | Josef Joh. Bucher (Liberal) | Kasimir Pfyffer (Liberal) | Anton Schnyder (Liberal) | Josef Martin Knüsel (Liberal) | Philipp Anton von Segesser (Conservative) | Alois Kopp (Conservative) | 7 seat 1851–1911 | | |
| 1856 | Josef Sigm. Bühler (Liberal) | Josef Joh. Bucher (Liberal) | Kasimir Pfyffer (Liberal) | Anton Schnyder (Liberal) | Josef Vonmatt (Liberal) | Philipp Anton von Segesser (Conservative) | Alois Kopp (Conservative) | 7 seat 1851–1911 | | |
| 1857 | Josef Sigm. Bühler (Liberal) | Josef Joh. Bucher (Liberal) | Kasimir Pfyffer (Liberal) | Anton Schnyder (Liberal) | Josef Vonmatt (Liberal) | Philipp Anton von Segesser (Conservative) | Alois Kopp (Conservative) | 7 seat 1851–1911 | | |
| 1859 | Josef Sigm. Bühler (Liberal) | Josef Joh. Bucher (Liberal) | Kasimir Pfyffer (Liberal) | Anton Schnyder (Liberal) | Josef Vonmatt (Liberal) | Philipp Anton von Segesser (Conservative) | Vinzenz Fischer (Conservative) | 7 seat 1851–1911 | | |
| 1860 | Josef Sigm. Bühler (Liberal) | Josef Joh. Bucher (Liberal) | Kasimir Pfyffer (Liberal) | Franz Widmer (Liberal) | Josef Vonmatt (Liberal) | Philipp Anton von Segesser (Conservative) | Vinzenz Fischer (Conservative) | 7 seat 1851–1911 | | |
| 1863 | Anton Hunkeler (Liberal) | Wilhelm Schindler (Liberal) | Hans Theiler (Liberal) | Anton Wapf (Liberal) | Josef Vonmatt (Liberal) | Philipp Anton von Segesser (Conservative) | Vinzenz Fischer (Conservative) | 7 seat 1851–1911 | | |
| 1865 | Anton Hunkeler (Liberal) | Josef Joh. Bucher (Liberal) | Hans Theiler (Liberal) | Anton Wapf (Liberal) | Josef Vonmatt (Liberal) | Philipp Anton von Segesser (Conservative) | Vinzenz Fischer (Conservative) | 7 seat 1851–1911 | | |
| 1866 | Anton Hunkeler (Liberal) | Josef Joh. Bucher (Liberal) | Hans Theiler (Liberal) | Anton Wapf (Liberal) | Josef Vonmatt (Liberal) | Philipp Anton von Segesser (Conservative) | Vinzenz Fischer (Conservative) | 7 seat 1851–1911 | | |
| 1869 | Franz Xaver Beck (Conservative) | Josef Joh. Bucher (Liberal) | Adam Herzog (Conservative) | Jost Peyer (Liberal) | Josef Vonmatt (Liberal) | Philipp Anton von Segesser (Conservative) | Vinzenz Fischer (Conservative) | 7 seat 1851–1911 | | |
| 1872 | Franz Xaver Beck (Conservative) | Josef Zingg (Liberal) | Joseph Zemp (Conservative) | Jost Peyer (Liberal) | Josef Vonmatt (Liberal) | Philipp Anton von Segesser (Conservative) | Vinzenz Fischer (Conservative) | 7 seat 1851–1911 | | |
| 1873 | Franz Xaver Beck (Conservative) | Josef Zingg (Liberal) | Joseph Zemp (Conservative) | Josef Bühler (Liberal) | Josef Vonmatt (Liberal) | Philipp Anton von Segesser (Conservative) | Vinzenz Fischer (Conservative) | 7 seat 1851–1911 | | |
| 1873 | Franz Xaver Beck (Conservative) | Josef Zingg (Liberal) | Joseph Zemp (Conservative) | Johann Amberg (Conservative) | Josef Vonmatt (Liberal) | Philipp Anton von Segesser (Conservative) | Vinzenz Fischer (Conservative) | 7 seat 1851–1911 | | |
| 1875 | Franz Xaver Beck (Conservative) | Josef Zingg (Liberal) | Joseph Zemp (Conservative) | Johann Amberg (Conservative) | Josef Vonmatt (Liberal) | Philipp Anton von Segesser (Conservative) | Vinzenz Fischer (Conservative) | 7 seat 1851–1911 | | |
| 1876 | Franz Xaver Beck (Conservative) | Josef Zingg (Liberal) | Alois Räber (Conservative) | Johann Amberg (Conservative) | Josef Vonmatt (Liberal) | Philipp Anton von Segesser (Conservative) | Vinzenz Fischer (Conservative) | 7 seat 1851–1911 | | |
| 1878 | Franz Xaver Beck (Conservative) | Josef Martin Knüsel (Liberal) | Alois Räber (Conservative) | Josef Erni (Conservative) | Josef Vonmatt (Liberal) | Philipp Anton von Segesser (Conservative) | Vinzenz Fischer (Conservative) | 7 seat 1851–1911 | | |
| 1879 | Franz Xaver Beck (Conservative) | Josef Martin Knüsel (Liberal) | Alois Räber (Conservative) | Josef Erni (Conservative) | Josef Vonmatt (Liberal) | Philipp Anton von Segesser (Conservative) | Leo Steiner (FDP/PRD) | 7 seat 1851–1911 | | |
| 1881 | Franz Xaver Beck (Conservative) | Friedrich Wüest (Liberal) | Candid Hochstrasser (Conservative) | Josef Erni (Conservative) | Josef Vonmatt (Liberal) | Philipp Anton von Segesser (Conservative) | Joseph Zemp (Conservative) | 7 seat 1851–1911 | | |
| 1884 | Franz Xaver Beck (Conservative) | Friedrich Wüest (Liberal) | Candid Hochstrasser (Conservative) | Josef Erni (Conservative) | Josef Vonmatt (Liberal) | Philipp Anton von Segesser (Conservative) | Joseph Zemp (Conservative) | 7 seat 1851–1911 | | |
| 1887 | Franz Xaver Beck (Conservative) | Friedrich Wüest (Liberal) | Candid Hochstrasser (Conservative) | Josef Erni (Conservative) | Josef Vonmatt (Liberal) | Philipp Anton von Segesser (Conservative) | Joseph Zemp (Conservative) | 7 seat 1851–1911 | | |
| 1888 | Franz Xaver Beck (Conservative) | Friedrich Wüest (Liberal) | Candid Hochstrasser (Conservative) | Josef Erni (Conservative) | Josef Vonmatt (Liberal) | Joseph Anton Schobinger (Conservative) | Joseph Zemp (Conservative) | 7 seat 1851–1911 | | |
| 1890 | Franz Xaver Beck (Conservative) | Friedrich Wüest (Liberal) | Candid Hochstrasser (Conservative) | Josef Erni (Conservative) | Josef Vonmatt (Liberal) | Joseph Anton Schobinger (Conservative) | Joseph Zemp (Conservative) | 7 seat 1851–1911 | | |
| 1891 | Franz Xaver Beck (Conservative) | Friedrich Wüest (Liberal) | Candid Hochstrasser (Conservative) | Josef Erni (Conservative) | Josef Vonmatt (Liberal) | Joseph Anton Schobinger (Conservative) | Hermann Heller (FDP/PRD) | 7 seat 1851–1911 | | |
| 1892 | Franz Xaver Beck (Conservative) | Theodor Schmid (Conservative) | Candid Hochstrasser (Conservative) | Josef Erni (Conservative) | Josef Vonmatt (Liberal) | Joseph Anton Schobinger (Conservative) | Hermann Heller (FDP/PRD) | 7 seat 1851–1911 | | |
| 1893 | Franz Xaver Beck (Conservative) | Theodor Schmid (Conservative) | Candid Hochstrasser (Conservative) | Josef Erni (Conservative) | Josef Vonmatt (Liberal) | Joseph Anton Schobinger (Conservative) | Hermann Heller (FDP/PRD) | 7 seat 1851–1911 | | |
| 1894 | Dominik Fellmann (Conservative) | Theodor Schmid (Conservative) | Candid Hochstrasser (Conservative) | Josef Erni (Conservative) | Jos. Leonz Weibel (FDP/PRD) | Joseph Anton Schobinger (Conservative) | Hermann Heller (FDP/PRD) | 7 seat 1851–1911 | | |
| 1896 | Dominik Fellmann (Conservative) | Theodor Schmid (Conservative) | Candid Hochstrasser (Conservative) | Josef Erni (Conservative) | Friedrich Degen (FDP/PRD) | Joseph Anton Schobinger (Conservative) | Hermann Heller (FDP/PRD) | 7 seat 1851–1911 | | |
| 1899 | Dominik Fellmann (Conservative) | Theodor Schmid (Conservative) | Candid Hochstrasser (Conservative) | Josef Erni (Conservative) | Friedrich Degen (FDP/PRD) | Joseph Anton Schobinger (Conservative) | Hermann Heller (FDP/PRD) | 7 seat 1851–1911 | | |
| 1901 | Dominik Fellmann (Conservative) | Theodor Schmid (Conservative) | Candid Hochstrasser (Conservative) | Josef Erni (Conservative) | Franz Bucher (FDP/PRD) | Joseph Anton Schobinger (Conservative) | Hermann Heller (FDP/PRD) | 7 seat 1851–1911 | | |
| 1902 | Dominik Fellmann (Conservative) | Theodor Schmid (Conservative) | Candid Hochstrasser (Conservative) | Peter Knüsel (FDP/PRD) | Franz Bucher (FDP/PRD) | Joseph Anton Schobinger (Conservative) | Hermann Heller (FDP/PRD) | 7 seat 1851–1911 | | |
| 1905 | Dominik Fellmann (Conservative) | Theodor Schmid (Conservative) | Candid Hochstrasser (Conservative) | Peter Knüsel (FDP/PRD) | Franz Bucher (FDP/PRD) | Joseph Anton Schobinger (Conservative) | Hermann Heller (FDP/PRD) | 7 seat 1851–1911 | | |
| 1907 | Dominik Fellmann (Conservative) | Josef Anton Balmer (Conservative) | Candid Hochstrasser (Conservative) | Peter Knüsel (FDP/PRD) | Otto Sidler (FDP/PRD) | Joseph Anton Schobinger (Conservative) | Hermann Heller (FDP/PRD) | 7 seat 1851–1911 | | |
| 1908 | Dominik Fellmann (Conservative) | Josef Anton Balmer (Conservative) | Candid Hochstrasser (Conservative) | Peter Knüsel (FDP/PRD) | Otto Sidler (FDP/PRD) | Heinrich Walther (Conservative) | Hermann Heller (FDP/PRD) | 7 seat 1851–1911 | | |
| 1909 | Dominik Fellmann (Conservative) | Josef Anton Balmer (Conservative) | Anton Erni (Conservative) | Peter Knüsel (FDP/PRD) | Otto Sidler (FDP/PRD) | Heinrich Walther (Conservative) | Hermann Heller (FDP/PRD) | 7 seat 1851–1911 | | |
| 1911 | Dominik Fellmann (Conservative) | Josef Anton Balmer (Conservative) | Anton Erni (Conservative) | Peter Knüsel (FDP/PRD) | Otto Sidler (FDP/PRD) | Heinrich Walther (Conservative) | Hermann Heller (FDP/PRD) | Franz Moser (Conservative) | 8 seats 1911–1922 | |
| 1914 | Dominik Fellmann (Conservative) | Josef Anton Balmer (Conservative) | Anton Erni (Conservative) | Peter Knüsel (FDP/PRD) | Otto Sidler (FDP/PRD) | Heinrich Walther (Conservative) | Hermann Heller (FDP/PRD) | Franz Moser (Conservative) | 8 seats 1911–1922 | |
| 1916 | Dominik Fellmann (Conservative) | Josef Anton Balmer (Conservative) | Eduard Häfliger (Conservative) | Peter Knüsel (FDP/PRD) | Otto Sidler (FDP/PRD) | Heinrich Walther (Conservative) | Hermann Heller (FDP/PRD) | Franz Moser (Conservative) | 8 seats 1911–1922 | |
| 1917 | Dominik Fellmann (Conservative) | Josef Anton Balmer (Conservative) | Eduard Häfliger (Conservative) | Peter Knüsel (FDP/PRD) | Gustav Schaller (FDP/PRD) | Heinrich Walther (Conservative) | Ferdinand Steiner (FDP/PRD) | Franz Moser (Conservative) | 8 seats 1911–1922 | |
| 1919 | Kaspar Müller (Conservative) | Josef Anton Balmer (Conservative) | Eduard Häfliger (Conservative) | Peter Knüsel (FDP/PRD) | Jakob Zimmerli (FDP/PRD) | Heinrich Walther (Conservative) | Ferdinand Steiner (FDP/PRD) | Franz Moser (Conservative) | 8 seats 1911–1922 | |
| 1922 | Kaspar Müller (Conservative) | Josef Anton Balmer (Conservative) | Eduard Häfliger (Conservative) | Peter Knüsel (FDP/PRD) | Jakob Zimmerli (FDP/PRD) | Heinrich Walther (Conservative) | Ferdinand Steiner (FDP/PRD) | Franz Moser (Conservative) | Josef Weibel (SP/PS) | 9 seat 1922–1995 |
| 1925 | Vinzenz Winiker (Conservative) | Josef Anton Balmer (Conservative) | Eduard Häfliger (Conservative) | Peter Knüsel (FDP/PRD) | Jakob Zimmerli (FDP/PRD) | Heinrich Walther (Conservative) | Alois Moser (FDP/PRD) | Franz Moser (Conservative) | Josef Weibel (SP/PS) | 9 seat 1922–1995 |
| 1928 | Vinzenz Winiker (Conservative) | Jakob Müller (Conservative) | Eduard Häfliger (Conservative) | Ignaz Burri (FDP/PRD) | Jakob Zimmerli (FDP/PRD) | Heinrich Walther (Conservative) | Alois Moser (FDP/PRD) | Franz Moser (Conservative) | Josef Weibel (SP/PS) | 9 seat 1922–1995 |
| 1931 | Karl Wick (Conservative) | Jakob Müller (Conservative) | Eduard Häfliger (Conservative) | Ignaz Burri (FDP/PRD) | Jakob Zimmerli (FDP/PRD) | Heinrich Walther (Conservative) | Ludwig-Friedrich Meyer (FDP/PRD) | Franz Moser (Conservative) | Josef Weibel (SP/PS) | 9 seat 1922–1995 |
| 1933 | Karl Wick (Conservative) | Eduard Isenschmid (Conservative) | Otto Studer (Conservative) | Ignaz Burri (FDP/PRD) | Jakob Zimmerli (FDP/PRD) | Heinrich Walther (Conservative) | Ludwig-Friedrich Meyer (FDP/PRD) | Franz Moser (Conservative) | Josef Weibel (SP/PS) | 9 seat 1922–1995 |
| 1935 | Karl Wick (Conservative) | Eduard Isenschmid (Conservative) | Otto Studer (Conservative) | Ignaz Burri (FDP/PRD) | Max Sigmund Wey (FDP/PRD) | Heinrich Walther (Conservative) | Ludwig-Friedrich Meyer (FDP/PRD) | Anton Stöckli (Conservative) | Eduard Arnold (SP/PS) | 9 seat 1922–1995 |
| 1939 | Karl Wick (Conservative) | Eduard Isenschmid (Conservative) | Otto Studer (Conservative) | Ignaz Burri (FDP/PRD) | Max Sigmund Wey (FDP/PRD) | Heinrich Walther (Conservative) | Ludwig-Friedrich Meyer (FDP/PRD) | Anton Stöckli (Conservative) | Eduard Arnold (SP/PS) | 9 seat 1922–1995 |
| 1941 | Karl Wick (Conservative) | Eduard Isenschmid (Conservative) | Otto Studer (Conservative) | Ignaz Burri (FDP/PRD) | Max Sigmund Wey (FDP/PRD) | Heinrich Walther (Conservative) | Kurt Bucher (FDP/PRD) | Anton Stöckli (Conservative) | Eduard Arnold (SP/PS) | 9 seat 1922–1995 |
| 1943 | Karl Wick (Conservative) | Eduard Isenschmid (Conservative) | Otto Studer (Conservative) | Ignaz Burri (FDP/PRD) | Max Sigmund Wey (FDP/PRD) | Carl Beck (Conservative) | Christian Clavadetscher (FDP/PRD) | Vinzenz Winiker (Conservative) | Paul Fröhlich (SP/PS) | 9 seat 1922–1995 |
| 1947 | Karl Wick (Conservative) | Alois Kunz (Conservative) | Otto Studer (Conservative) | Kurt Bucher (FDP/PRD) | Max Sigmund Wey (FDP/PRD) | Carl Beck (Conservative) | Christian Clavadetscher (FDP/PRD) | Vinzenz Winiker (Conservative) | Paul Fröhlich (SP/PS) | 9 seat 1922–1995 |
| 1950 | Karl Wick (Conservative) | Alois Kunz (Conservative) | Otto Studer (Conservative) | Kurt Bucher (FDP/PRD) | Max Sigmund Wey (FDP/PRD) | Carl Beck (Conservative) | Christian Clavadetscher (FDP/PRD) | Vinzenz Winiker (Conservative) | Werner Allgöwer (SP/PS) | 9 seat 1922–1995 |
| 1951 | Karl Wick (Conservative) | Alois Kunz (Conservative) | Otto Studer (Conservative) | Kurt Bucher (FDP/PRD) | Max Sigmund Wey (FDP/PRD) | Carl Beck (Conservative) | Christian Clavadetscher (FDP/PRD) | Hans Fischer (Conservative) | Werner Allgöwer (SP/PS) | 9 seat 1922–1995 |
| 1953 | Karl Wick (Conservative) | Alois Kunz (Conservative) | Otto Studer (Conservative) | Kurt Bucher (FDP/PRD) | Alfred Ackermann (FDP/PRD) | Carl Beck (Conservative) | Christian Clavadetscher (FDP/PRD) | Hans Fischer (Conservative) | Werner Allgöwer (SP/PS) | 9 seat 1922–1995 |
| 1955 | Karl Wick (Conservative) | Franz-Josef Kurmann (Conservative) | Otto Studer (Conservative) | Kurt Bucher (FDP/PRD) | Alfred Ackermann (FDP/PRD) | Carl Beck (Conservative) | Niklaus Honauer (FDP/PRD) | Hans Fischer (Conservative) | Max Kistler (SP/PS) | 9 seat 1922–1995 |
| 1958 | Karl Wick (Conservative) | Franz-Josef Kurmann (Conservative) | Otto Studer (Conservative) | Fritz Malzacher (FDP/PRD) | Alfred Ackermann (FDP/PRD) | Carl Beck (Conservative) | Niklaus Honauer (FDP/PRD) | Hans Fischer (Conservative) | Max Kistler (SP/PS) | 9 seat 1922–1995 |
| 1959 | Karl Wick (Conservative) | Franz-Josef Kurmann (Conservative) | Otto Studer (Conservative) | Fritz Malzacher (FDP/PRD) | Alfred Ackermann (FDP/PRD) | Werner Kurzmeyer (FDP/PRD) | Niklaus Honauer (FDP/PRD) | Hans Fischer (Conservative) | Josef Leu (CCS) | 9 seat 1922–1995 |
| 1962 | Karl Wick (Conservative) | Franz-Josef Kurmann (Conservative) | Otto Studer (Conservative) | Fritz Malzacher (FDP/PRD) | Alfred Ackermann (FDP/PRD) | Werner Kurzmeyer (FDP/PRD) | Hans Rudolf Meyer (FDP/PRD) | Hans Fischer (Conservative) | Josef Leu (CCS) | 9 seat 1922–1995 |
| 1963 | Josef Duss (CCS) | Franz-Josef Kurmann (Conservative) | Hans Korner (CCS) | Anton Muheim (SP/PS) | Alfred Ackermann (FDP/PRD) | Werner Kurzmeyer (FDP/PRD) | Hans Rudolf Meyer (FDP/PRD) | Alfons Müller (CCS) | Josef Leu (CCS) | 9 seat 1922–1995 |
| 1967 | Josef Duss (CCS) | Franz-Josef Kurmann (Conservative) | Hans Korner (CCS) | Anton Muheim (SP/PS) | Alfred Ackermann (FDP/PRD) | Werner Kurzmeyer (FDP/PRD) | Hans Rudolf Meyer (FDP/PRD) | Alfons Müller (CCS) | Josef Leu (CCS) | 9 seat 1922–1995 |
| 1969 | Josef Duss (CCS) | Franz-Josef Kurmann (Conservative) | Joseph Egli (CCS) | Anton Muheim (SP/PS) | Alfred Ackermann (FDP/PRD) | Werner Kurzmeyer (FDP/PRD) | Hans Rudolf Meyer (FDP/PRD) | Alfons Müller (CCS) | Josef Leu (CCS) | 9 seat 1922–1995 |
| 1970 | Josef Duss (CCS) | Franz-Josef Kurmann (Conservative) | Joseph Egli (CCS) | Anton Muheim (SP/PS) | Albert Krummenacher (FDP/PRD) | Werner Kurzmeyer (FDP/PRD) | Hans Rudolf Meyer (FDP/PRD) | Alfons Müller (CCS) | Josef Leu (CCS) | 9 seat 1922–1995 |
| 1971 | Julius Birrer (CVP/PDC) | Josi J. Meier (CVP/PDC) | Joseph Egli (CCS) | Anton Muheim (SP/PS) | Kaspar Meier (FDP/PRD) | Erwin Muff (FDP/PRD) | Hans Rudolf Meyer (FDP/PRD) | Alfons Müller (CCS) | Hans Stadelmann (CVP/PDC) | 9 seat 1922–1995 |
| 1975 | Franz Jung (CVP/PDC) | Josi J. Meier (CVP/PDC) | Joseph Egli (CCS) | Anton Muheim (SP/PS) | Kaspar Meier (FDP/PRD) | Erwin Muff (FDP/PRD) | Hans Rudolf Meyer (FDP/PRD) | Alfons Müller (CCS) | Hans Schärli (CVP/PDC) | 9 seat 1922–1995 |
| 1979 | Franz Jung (CVP/PDC) | Josi J. Meier (CVP/PDC) | Manfred Aregger (FDP/PRD) | Anton Muheim (SP/PS) | Kaspar Meier (FDP/PRD) | Erwin Muff (FDP/PRD) | Theodor Schnider (CVP/PDC) | Alfons Müller (CCS) | Hans Schärli (CVP/PDC) | 9 seat 1922–1995 |
| 1982 | Franz Jung (CVP/PDC) | Josi J. Meier (CVP/PDC) | Manfred Aregger (FDP/PRD) | Anton Muheim (SP/PS) | Kaspar Meier (FDP/PRD) | Kaspar Villiger (FDP/PRD) | Theodor Schnider (CVP/PDC) | Alfons Müller (CCS) | Hans Schärli (CVP/PDC) | 9 seat 1922–1995 |
| 1983 | Franz Jung (CVP/PDC) | Theo Fischer (CVP/PDC) | Manfred Aregger (FDP/PRD) | Fritz Lanz (SP/PS) | Karl Tschuppert (FDP/PRD) | Kaspar Villiger (FDP/PRD) | Theodor Schnider (CVP/PDC) | Judith Stamm (CVP/PDC) | Hans Schärli (CVP/PDC) | 9 seat 1922–1995 |
| 1987 | Franz Jung (CVP/PDC) | Theo Fischer (CVP/PDC) | Manfred Aregger (FDP/PRD) | Fritz Lanz (SP/PS) | Karl Tschuppert (FDP/PRD) | Paul Fäh (FDP/PRD) | Theodor Schnider (CVP/PDC) | Judith Stamm (CVP/PDC) | Rosmarie Dormann (CVP/PDC) | 9 seat 1922–1995 |
| 1991 | Josef Leu (CVP/PDC) | Theo Fischer (CVP/PDC) | Manfred Aregger (FDP/PRD) | Werner Jöri (SP/PS) | Karl Tschuppert (FDP/PRD) | Cécile Bühlmann (GPS/PES) | Theodor Schnider (CVP/PDC) | Judith Stamm (CVP/PDC) | Rosmarie Dormann (CVP/PDC) | 9 seat 1922–1995 |
| 1995 | Josef Leu (CVP/PDC) | Josef Kunz (SVP/UDC) | Manfred Aregger (FDP/PRD) | Werner Jöri (SP/PS) | Karl Tschuppert (FDP/PRD) | Cécile Bühlmann (GPS/PES) | Josef Lötscher (CVP/PDC) | Judith Stamm (CVP/PDC) | Rosmarie Dormann (CVP/PDC) | Georges Theiler (FDP/PRD / FDP.The Liberals) |
| 1996 | Josef Leu (CVP/PDC) | Josef Kunz (SVP/UDC) | Manfred Aregger (FDP/PRD) | Hans Widmer (SP/PS) | Karl Tschuppert (FDP/PRD) | Cécile Bühlmann (GPS/PES) | Josef Lötscher (CVP/PDC) | Judith Stamm (CVP/PDC) | Rosmarie Dormann (CVP/PDC) | Georges Theiler (FDP/PRD / FDP.The Liberals) |
| 1999 | Josef Leu (CVP/PDC) | Josef Kunz (SVP/UDC) | Otto Laubacher (SVP/UDC) | Hans Widmer (SP/PS) | Karl Tschuppert (FDP/PRD) | Cécile Bühlmann (GPS/PES) | Heinrich Estermann (CVP/PDC) | Ruedi Lustenberger (CVP/PDC) | Rosmarie Dormann (CVP/PDC) | Georges Theiler (FDP/PRD / FDP.The Liberals) |
| 2003 | Josef Leu (CVP/PDC) | Josef Kunz (SVP/UDC) | Otto Laubacher (SVP/UDC) | Hans Widmer (SP/PS) | Otto Ineichen (FDP/PRD) | Cécile Bühlmann (GPS/PES) | Franz Brun (CVP/PDC) | Ruedi Lustenberger (CVP/PDC) | Felix Müri (SVP/UDC) | Georges Theiler (FDP/PRD / FDP.The Liberals) |
| 2006 | Ida Glanzmann-Hunkeler (CVP/PDC) | Josef Kunz (SVP/UDC) | Otto Laubacher (SVP/UDC) | Hans Widmer (SP/PS) | Otto Ineichen (FDP/PRD) | Louis Schelbert (GPS/PES) | Franz Brun (CVP/PDC) | Ruedi Lustenberger (CVP/PDC) | Felix Müri (SVP/UDC) | Georges Theiler (FDP/PRD / FDP.The Liberals) |
| 2007 | Ida Glanzmann-Hunkeler (CVP/PDC) | Josef Kunz (SVP/UDC) | Yvette Estermann (SVP/UDC) | Hans Widmer (SP/PS) | Otto Ineichen (FDP/PRD) | Louis Schelbert (GPS/PES) | Pius Segmüller (CVP/PDC) | Ruedi Lustenberger (CVP/PDC) | Felix Müri (SVP/UDC) | Georges Theiler (FDP/PRD / FDP.The Liberals) |
| 2010 | Ida Glanzmann-Hunkeler (CVP/PDC) | Josef Kunz (SVP/UDC) | Yvette Estermann (SVP/UDC) | Prisca Birrer-Heimo (SP/PS) | Otto Ineichen (FDP/PRD) | Louis Schelbert (GPS/PES) | Pius Segmüller (CVP/PDC) | Ruedi Lustenberger (CVP/PDC) | Felix Müri (SVP/UDC) | Georges Theiler (FDP/PRD / FDP.The Liberals) |
| 2011 | Ida Glanzmann-Hunkeler (CVP/PDC) | Roland Fischer (GLP/PVL) | Yvette Estermann (SVP/UDC) | Prisca Birrer-Heimo (SP/PS) | Otto Ineichen (FDP/PRD) | Louis Schelbert (GPS/PES) | Leo Müller (CVP/PDC / The Centre) | Ruedi Lustenberger (CVP/PDC) | Felix Müri (SVP/UDC) | Albert Vitali (FDP.The Liberals) |
| 2012 | Ida Glanzmann-Hunkeler (CVP/PDC) | Roland Fischer (GLP/PVL) | Yvette Estermann (SVP/UDC) | Prisca Birrer-Heimo (SP/PS) | Peter Schilliger (FDP.The Liberals) | Louis Schelbert (GPS/PES) | Leo Müller (CVP/PDC / The Centre) | Ruedi Lustenberger (CVP/PDC) | Felix Müri (SVP/UDC) | Albert Vitali (FDP.The Liberals) |
| 2015 | Ida Glanzmann-Hunkeler (CVP/PDC) | Franz Grüter (SVP/UDC) | Yvette Estermann (SVP/UDC) | Prisca Birrer-Heimo (SP/PS) | Peter Schilliger (FDP.The Liberals) | Louis Schelbert (GPS/PES) | Leo Müller (CVP/PDC / The Centre) | Andrea Gmür-Schönenberger (CVP/PDC) | Felix Müri (SVP/UDC) | Albert Vitali (FDP.The Liberals) |
| 2018 | Ida Glanzmann-Hunkeler (CVP/PDC) | Franz Grüter (SVP/UDC) | Yvette Estermann (SVP/UDC) | Prisca Birrer-Heimo (SP/PS) | Peter Schilliger (FDP.The Liberals) | Michael Töngi (GPS/PES) | Leo Müller (CVP/PDC / The Centre) | Andrea Gmür-Schönenberger (CVP/PDC) | Felix Müri (SVP/UDC) | Albert Vitali (FDP.The Liberals) |
| 2019 | Ida Glanzmann-Hunkeler (CVP/PDC) | Franz Grüter (SVP/UDC) | Yvette Estermann (SVP/UDC) | Prisca Birrer-Heimo (SP/PS) | Roland Fischer (GLP/PVL) | Michael Töngi (GPS/PES) | Leo Müller (CVP/PDC / The Centre) | Andrea Gmür-Schönenberger (CVP/PDC) | 9 seats 2019-present | Albert Vitali (FDP.The Liberals) |
| 2023 | Pius Kaufmann (The Centre) | Franz Grüter (SVP/UDC) | Vroni Thalmann-Bieri (SVP/UDC) | David Roth (SP/PS) | Hasan Candan (SP/PS) | Michael Töngi (GPS/PES) | Leo Müller (CVP/PDC / The Centre) | Priska Wismer-Felder (The Centre) | 9 seats 2019-present | Peter Schilliger (FDP.The Liberals) |
