= Črna Prst =

Mountain peak in the Julian Alps

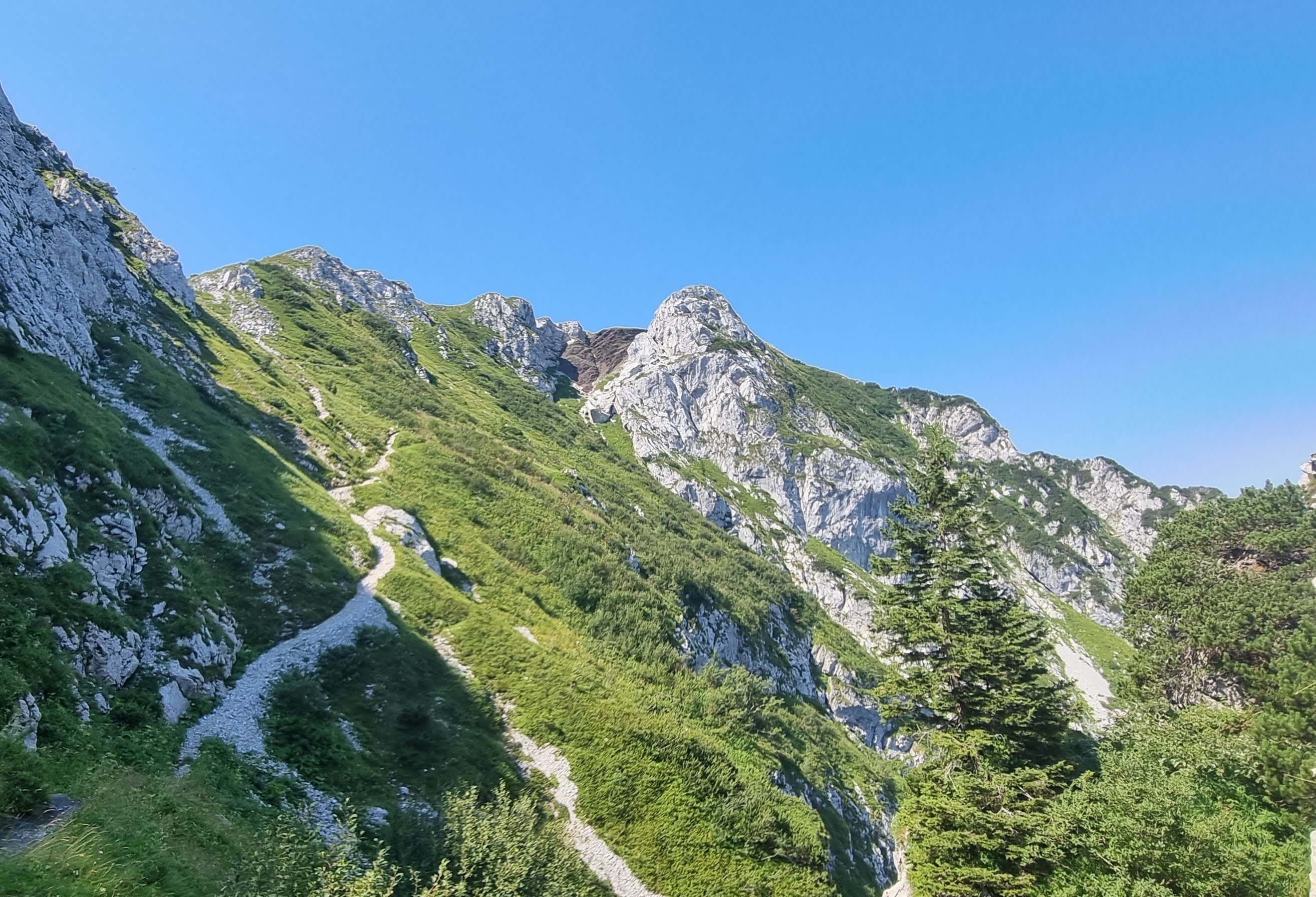
- View of Črna Prst from the northeast

Highest point
- Elevation: 1,844 m (6,050 ft)
- Prominence: 147 m (482 ft)
- Coordinates: 46°14′22″N 13°55′16″E

Naming
- English translation: black soil

Geography
- Location within Slovenia
- Country: Slovenia
- Municipalities: Tolmin and Radovljica
- Parent range: Julian Alps

Geology
- Rock age: Early Jurassic

Črna Prst is a mountain in the southeastern Julian Alps, on the edge of Triglav National Park in Slovenia. Standing at 1,844 metres (6,050 ft), it is the 370th–highest peak in Slovenia. During the interwar period, the mountain ridge formed part of the border between Italy and Yugoslavia.

== Name ==
The Slovene name Črna Prst, literally 'black soil', refers to a dark patch of rock near the summit formed of shaley claystones and deposits of the magnesium ore psilomelane.

== Flora and botany ==
One of the first botanists to visit the mountain may have been Franz Xaver von Wulfen, who in 1789 mentioned a sample of Geranium argenteum from Črna Prst sent to him by Karl von Zois. It is unlikely that Zois himself visited the mountain, but his pickers definitely did. The reputation of the mountain was consolidated by botanist Žiga Graf by publications on the flora of the mountain in the 1830s. Muzio Tommasini, mayor of Trieste, visited the mountain in 1840, and interest in the flora of the mountain was furthered after Frederick Augustus II of Saxony visited the mountain in 1841.

Several species that are rare elsewhere in Slovenia flourish on the slopes of Črna Prst. White adder's mouth (Malaxis monophyllos) grows on the shaded Bohinj side. So do the clasping twistedstalk (Streptopus amplexifolius) and Hieracium prenanthoides, although these also grow among tall herbs on the sunny southern slopes of the mountain. The giant bellflower (Campanula latifolia) thrives on the slopes of Lisec in avalanche gullies overgrown with tall herb communities, green alder and sycamore and beech trees.

Five species of European conservation importance inhabit Črna Prst: the short-haired sandwort (Moehringia villosa), the "queen of the Alps" (Eryngium alpinum), the Bertoloni columbine (Aquilegia bertolonii), the yellow lady's slipper orchid (Cypripedium calceolus) and Zois' bellflower (Campanula zoysii).

== History ==
Between 1920 and 1947, the border between the kingdoms of Italy and Yugoslavia followed the mountain ridge that surrounds Podbrdo. Under the 1920 Treaty of Rapallo, the Austrian Littoral—later renamed the Julian March—was assigned to Italy; the 1947 Treaty of Paris ceded it to Yugoslavia.

In 1921, Italian soldiers marked the new border with numbered concrete milestones and built military outposts at Črna Prst, Slatnik, Porezen, Grant and Podbrdo. Črna Prst was the highest of the guard huts as, due to the nature of the terrain, no enemy attack was expected further along the ridge; it was only defended in the summer months.

In 1927, the Italians began building military trails from Podbrdo to these strategically important peaks. The routes were built by special military work battalions from the 7th Alpini Regiment consisting of three groups of alpinists and a group of engineers. Construction took place from early spring to late fall; due to the manual methods used by the Italian soldiers (such as shovels, hand-held drills, dynamite), work proceeded very slowly and lasted for several years, despite the large number of soldiers.

After the Second World War, the hut fell into disuse. In 1954, the Mountaineering Association of Most na Soči converted the former Italian military guard hut into a mountain lodge, though it closed in 1958. In 1959, the Alpine Association of Slovenia handed it over to the Mountaineering Association of Podbrdo for management, care and restoration, and over the course of the 1960s, it completely changed its appearance, as the association remodeled, extended and upgraded it. On August 7, 1966, an opening ceremony was held and the renovated building was named after soldier and mountaineer Zorko Jelinčič. A freight cable car was constructed to aid with maintenance of the hut, with its first ascent taking place on August 3, 1976.

== Access ==
The mountain is located along the red trail of the Via Alpina.

There are several marked hiking trails leading to the summit, namely:

1. From Bohinjska Bistrica, past the Orožna mountain hut through the Planina za Liscem.
2. From Bohinjska Bistrica, optionally up an asphalt road through Ravne, and then through Planina za Črno goro.
3. From Podbrdo, past the village of Trtnik and over the Čez Suho pass.
4. From Podbrdo, through the village of Bača and over the Vrh Bača saddle.

Alternatively, a significant portion of the way up the mountain can be walked along regional roads:

1. Paved local road from Hudajužna, through Stržišče.
2. Regional road from Škofja Loka via Petrovo Brdo.
3. Regional asphalt road from Most na Soči via Petrovo Brdo.
