= List of members of the Federal Assembly from the Canton of Schaffhausen =

Coat of Arms

This is a list of members of both houses of the Federal Assembly from the Canton of Schaffhausen.

== Members of the Council of States ==
Councillor (Party)	Election	Councillor (Party)
Karl Hektor Ehrmann; Liberal Party; 1848–1849	Appointed	Zacharias Gysel; Liberal Party; 1848–1850
Johann Heinrich Ammann; Liberal Party; 1849–1855	Appointed	Zacharias Gysel; Liberal Party; 1848–1850
Johann Heinrich Ammann; Liberal Party; 1849–1855	Appointed	Hieronymus Murbach; Liberal Party; 1850–1852
Johann Heinrich Ammann; Liberal Party; 1849–1855	Appointed	Jak. Christoph Schenkel; Liberal Party; 1852–1853
Johann Heinrich Ammann; Liberal Party; 1849–1855	Appointed	Joh. Georg Oschwald; Liberal Party; 1853–1854
Johann Heinrich Ammann; Liberal Party; 1849–1855	Appointed	Hieronymus Murbach; Liberal Party; 1854–1857
Zacharias Gysel; Liberal Party; 1855–1857	Appointed	Hieronymus Murbach; Liberal Party; 1854–1857
Johann Heinrich Ammann; Liberal Party; 1857–1859	Appointed	Julius C. Ziegler; Liberal Party; 1857–1859
Hieronymus Murbach; Liberal Party; 1859–1865	Appointed	C. Emil Ringk; Liberal Party; 1859–1859
Hieronymus Murbach; Liberal Party; 1859–1865	Appointed	Hans von Ziegler; Conservateurs réformés 1859–1865
Johannes Hallauer; Liberal Party; 1865–1873	Appointed	Heinrich Stamm; Swiss Democrats; 1865–1874
Eduard Russenberger; Swiss Democrats; 1873–1878	Appointed	Heinrich Stamm; Swiss Democrats; 1865–1874
Eduard Russenberger; Swiss Democrats; 1873–1878	Appointed	Heinrich Gustav Schoch; Proche des Grutléens; 1875–1875
Eduard Russenberger; Swiss Democrats; 1873–1878	Appointed	Hermann Freuler; Liberal Party; 1875–1881
Johannes Hallauer; Liberal Party; 1878–1879	Appointed	Hermann Freuler; Liberal Party; 1875–1881
Johannes Müller; Free Democratic Party; 1879–1906	Appointed	Hermann Freuler; Liberal Party; 1875–1881
Johannes Müller; Free Democratic Party; 1879–1906	Appointed	Heinrich Gustav Schoch; Proche des socialistes 1881–1895
Johannes Müller; Free Democratic Party; 1879–1906	Appointed	Hermann Freuler; Liberal Party; 1895–1896
Johannes Müller; Free Democratic Party; 1879–1906	Appointed	P. Albert Ammann; Free Democratic Party; 1896–1928
Beat Heinrich Bolli; Free Democratic Party; 1906–1933	Appointed	P. Albert Ammann; Free Democratic Party; 1896–1928
Beat Heinrich Bolli; Free Democratic Party; 1906–1933	Appointed	Johannes Winzeler; Paysans, Artisans et Bourgeois; 1928–1947
Hans Käser; Free Democratic Party; 1933–1943	Appointed	Johannes Winzeler; Paysans, Artisans et Bourgeois; 1928–1947
Julius Bührer; Free Democratic Party; 1943–1946	Appointed	Johannes Winzeler; Paysans, Artisans et Bourgeois; 1928–1947
Kurt Schoch; Free Democratic Party; 1946–1960	Appointed	Johannes Winzeler; Paysans, Artisans et Bourgeois; 1928–1947
Kurt Schoch; Free Democratic Party; 1946–1960	Appointed	Ernst Lieb; Paysans, Artisans et Bourgeois; 1947–1963
Kurt Bächtold; Free Democratic Party; 1961–1979	Appointed	Ernst Lieb; Paysans, Artisans et Bourgeois; 1947–1963
Kurt Bächtold; Free Democratic Party; 1961–1979	1963	Konrad Graf; Paysans, Artisans et Bourgeois; 1963–1979
Kurt Bächtold; Free Democratic Party; 1961–1979	1967	Konrad Graf; Paysans, Artisans et Bourgeois; 1963–1979
Kurt Bächtold; Free Democratic Party; 1961–1979	1971	Konrad Graf; Paysans, Artisans et Bourgeois; 1963–1979
Kurt Bächtold; Free Democratic Party; 1961–1979	1975	Konrad Graf; Paysans, Artisans et Bourgeois; 1963–1979
Esther Bührer; Social Democratic Party; 1979–1991	1979	Ernst Steiner; Swiss People's Party; 1979–1987
Esther Bührer; Social Democratic Party; 1979–1991	1983	Ernst Steiner; Swiss People's Party; 1979–1987
Esther Bührer; Social Democratic Party; 1979–1991	1987	Bernhard Seiler; Swiss People's Party; 1987–1999
Kurt Schüle; Free Democratic Party; 1991–1999	1991	Bernhard Seiler; Swiss People's Party; 1987–1999
Kurt Schüle; Free Democratic Party; 1991–1999	1995	Bernhard Seiler; Swiss People's Party; 1987–1999
Peter Briner; Free Democratic Party; 1999–2009; FDP.The Liberals; 2009–2011	1999	Rico Wenger; Swiss People's Party; 1999–2002
Peter Briner; Free Democratic Party; 1999–2009; FDP.The Liberals; 2009–2011	2002	Hannes Germann; Swiss People's Party; 2002–present
Peter Briner; Free Democratic Party; 1999–2009; FDP.The Liberals; 2009–2011	2003	Hannes Germann; Swiss People's Party; 2002–present
Peter Briner; Free Democratic Party; 1999–2009; FDP.The Liberals; 2009–2011	2007	Hannes Germann; Swiss People's Party; 2002–present
Peter Briner; Free Democratic Party; 1999–2009; FDP.The Liberals; 2009–2011	2009	Hannes Germann; Swiss People's Party; 2002–present
Thomas Minder; Independent; 2011–2023	2011	Hannes Germann; Swiss People's Party; 2002–present
Thomas Minder; Independent; 2011–2023	2015	Hannes Germann; Swiss People's Party; 2002–present
Thomas Minder; Independent; 2011–2023	2019	Hannes Germann; Swiss People's Party; 2002–present
Simon Stocker; Social Democratic Party; 2023–present	2023	Hannes Germann; Swiss People's Party; 2002–present

== Members of the National Council ==
Election	Councillor (Party)	Councillor (Party)	Councillor (Party)
1848	Johann Georg Boeschenstein (Liberal)	Johann Friedrich Peyer im Hof (Liberal)	2 seats 1848–1922
1850	Johann Georg Fuog (FDP/PRD)	Johann Friedrich Peyer im Hof (Liberal)	2 seats 1848–1922
1851	Johann Georg Fuog (FDP/PRD)	Johann Friedrich Peyer im Hof (Liberal)	2 seats 1848–1922
1854	Johann Georg Fuog (FDP/PRD)	Stefano Franscini (FDP/PRD)	2 seats 1848–1922
1855	Johann Georg Fuog (FDP/PRD)	Franz Adolf Schalch (Liberal)	2 seats 1848–1922
1857	Johann Georg Fuog (FDP/PRD)	Johann Friedrich Peyer im Hof (Liberal)	2 seats 1848–1922
1860	Johann Heinrich Ammann (Liberal)	Johann Friedrich Peyer im Hof (Liberal)	2 seats 1848–1922
1863	Wilhelm J. B. Joos (SD/DS)	Johann Friedrich Peyer im Hof (Liberal)	2 seats 1848–1922
1866	Wilhelm J. B. Joos (SD/DS)	Johann Friedrich Peyer im Hof (Liberal)	2 seats 1848–1922
1869	Wilhelm J. B. Joos (SD/DS)	Johann Friedrich Peyer im Hof (Liberal)	2 seats 1848–1922
1872	Wilhelm J. B. Joos (SD/DS)	Johann Friedrich Peyer im Hof (Liberal)	2 seats 1848–1922
1875	Wilhelm J. B. Joos (SD/DS)	Heinrich Gustav Schoch (proc grut*)	2 seats 1848–1922
1878	Wilhelm J. B. Joos (SD/DS)	Robert Grieshaber (FDP/PRD)	2 seats 1848–1922
1881	Wilhelm J. B. Joos (SD/DS)	Robert Grieshaber (FDP/PRD)	2 seats 1848–1922
1884	Wilhelm J. B. Joos (SD/DS)	Robert Grieshaber (FDP/PRD)	2 seats 1848–1922
1887	Wilhelm J. B. Joos (SD/DS)	Robert Grieshaber (FDP/PRD)	2 seats 1848–1922
1890	Wilhelm J. B. Joos (SD/DS)	Robert Grieshaber (FDP/PRD)	2 seats 1848–1922
1893	Wilhelm J. B. Joos (SD/DS)	Robert Grieshaber (FDP/PRD)	2 seats 1848–1922
1896	Wilhelm J. B. Joos (SD/DS)	Robert Grieshaber (FDP/PRD)	2 seats 1848–1922
1899	Wilhelm J. B. Joos (SD/DS)	Robert Grieshaber (FDP/PRD)	2 seats 1848–1922
1900	Carl A. Spahn (FDP/PRD)	Robert Grieshaber (FDP/PRD)	2 seats 1848–1922
1902	Carl A. Spahn (FDP/PRD)	Robert Grieshaber (FDP/PRD)	2 seats 1848–1922
1905	Carl A. Spahn (FDP/PRD)	Robert Grieshaber (FDP/PRD)	2 seats 1848–1922
1908	Carl A. Spahn (FDP/PRD)	Robert Grieshaber (FDP/PRD)	2 seats 1848–1922
1911	Carl A. Spahn (FDP/PRD)	Robert Grieshaber (FDP/PRD)	2 seats 1848–1922
1914	Carl A. Spahn (FDP/PRD)	Robert Grieshaber (FDP/PRD)	2 seats 1848–1922
1917	Carl A. Spahn (FDP/PRD)	Robert Grieshaber (FDP/PRD)	2 seats 1848–1922
1919	Jakob Hefti (Grut&Dém*)	Traugott Waldvogel (PAB)	2 seats 1848–1922
1921	Jakob Ruh (PAB)	Traugott Waldvogel (PAB)	2 seats 1848–1922
1922	Jakob Ruh (PAB)	Traugott Waldvogel (PAB)	Arthur Moser (FDP/PRD)
1925	Johannes Winzeler (PAB)	Traugott Waldvogel (PAB)	Arthur Moser (FDP/PRD)
1925	Walther Bringolf (Communist) later (CO)	Traugott Waldvogel (PAB)	Arthur Moser (FDP/PRD)
1928	Walther Bringolf (Communist) later (CO)	Traugott Waldvogel (PAB)	Arthur Moser (FDP/PRD)
1931	Walther Bringolf (Communist) later (CO)	Arnold Rahm (PAB)	2 seats 1931–present
1932	Walther Bringolf (Communist) later (CO)	Jakob Ruh (PAB)	2 seats 1931–present
1935	Paul Schmid-Ammann (BP*)	Jakob Ruh (PAB)	2 seats 1931–present
1935	Heinrich Sigerist (FDP/PRD)	Walther Bringolf (SP/PS)	2 seats 1931–present
1939	Heinrich Sigerist (FDP/PRD)	Walther Bringolf (SP/PS)	2 seats 1931–present
1943	Heinrich Sigerist (FDP/PRD)	Walther Bringolf (SP/PS)	2 seats 1931–present
1947	Carl Scherrer (FDP/PRD)	Walther Bringolf (SP/PS)	2 seats 1931–present
1951	Carl Scherrer (FDP/PRD)	Walther Bringolf (SP/PS)	2 seats 1931–present
1955	Carl Scherrer (FDP/PRD)	Walther Bringolf (SP/PS)	2 seats 1931–present
1959	Carl Scherrer (FDP/PRD)	Walther Bringolf (SP/PS)	2 seats 1931–present
1963	Hermann Wanner (FDP/PRD)	Walther Bringolf (SP/PS)	2 seats 1931–present
1967	Hermann Wanner (FDP/PRD)	Walther Bringolf (SP/PS)	2 seats 1931–present
1970	Erwin Waldvogel (FDP/PRD)	Walther Bringolf (SP/PS)	2 seats 1931–present
1971	Erwin Waldvogel (FDP/PRD)	Kurt Reiniger (SP/PS)	2 seats 1931–present
1975	Erwin Waldvogel (FDP/PRD)	Kurt Reiniger (SP/PS)	2 seats 1931–present
1979	Kurt Schüle (FDP/PRD)	Kurt Reiniger (SP/PS)	2 seats 1931–present
1983	Kurt Schüle (FDP/PRD)	Walter Stamm (SP/PS)	2 seats 1931–present
1987	Kurt Schüle (FDP/PRD)	Ursula Hafner (SP/PS)	2 seats 1931–present
1991	Gerold Bührer (FDP/PRD)	Ursula Hafner (SP/PS)	2 seats 1931–present
1995	Gerold Bührer (FDP/PRD)	Ursula Hafner (SP/PS)	2 seats 1931–present
1999	Gerold Bührer (FDP/PRD)	Hans-Jürg Fehr (SP/PS)	2 seats 1931–present
2003	Gerold Bührer (FDP/PRD)	Hans-Jürg Fehr (SP/PS)	2 seats 1931–present
2007	Thomas Hurter (SVP/UDC)	Hans-Jürg Fehr (SP/PS)	2 seats 1931–present
2011	Thomas Hurter (SVP/UDC)	Hans-Jürg Fehr (SP/PS)	2 seats 1931–present
2013	Thomas Hurter (SVP/UDC)	Martina Munz (SP/PS)	2 seats 1931–present
2015	Thomas Hurter (SVP/UDC)	Martina Munz (SP/PS)	2 seats 1931–present
2019	Thomas Hurter (SVP/UDC)	Martina Munz (SP/PS)	2 seats 1931–present
2023	Thomas Hurter (SVP/UDC)	Martina Munz (SP/PS)	2 seats 1931–present
