= Carl Burckhardt =

Carl or Karl Burckhardt may refer to:

- Johann Karl Burckhardt (1773–1825), German astronomer and mathematician
- Karl Burckhardt (1830–1893), Swiss politician
- Carl Burckhardt (sculptor) (1878–1923), Swiss painter and sculptor
- Carl Jacob Burckhardt (1891–1974), Swiss diplomat and historian
