= Esajas =

Esajas is a surname. It may refer to:

- Dion Esajas (born 1980), Dutch footballer
- Etiënne Esajas (born 1984), Dutch footballer
- Harvey Esajas (born 1974), Dutch footballer
- Malcolm Esajas (born 1986), Dutch footballer
- Silvinho Esajas (born 2002), Dutch footballer
- Wim Esajas (1935–2005), Surinamese middle-distance runner

See also:

- Esajas Zweifel (1827–1904), Swiss politician
