= Martina Munz =

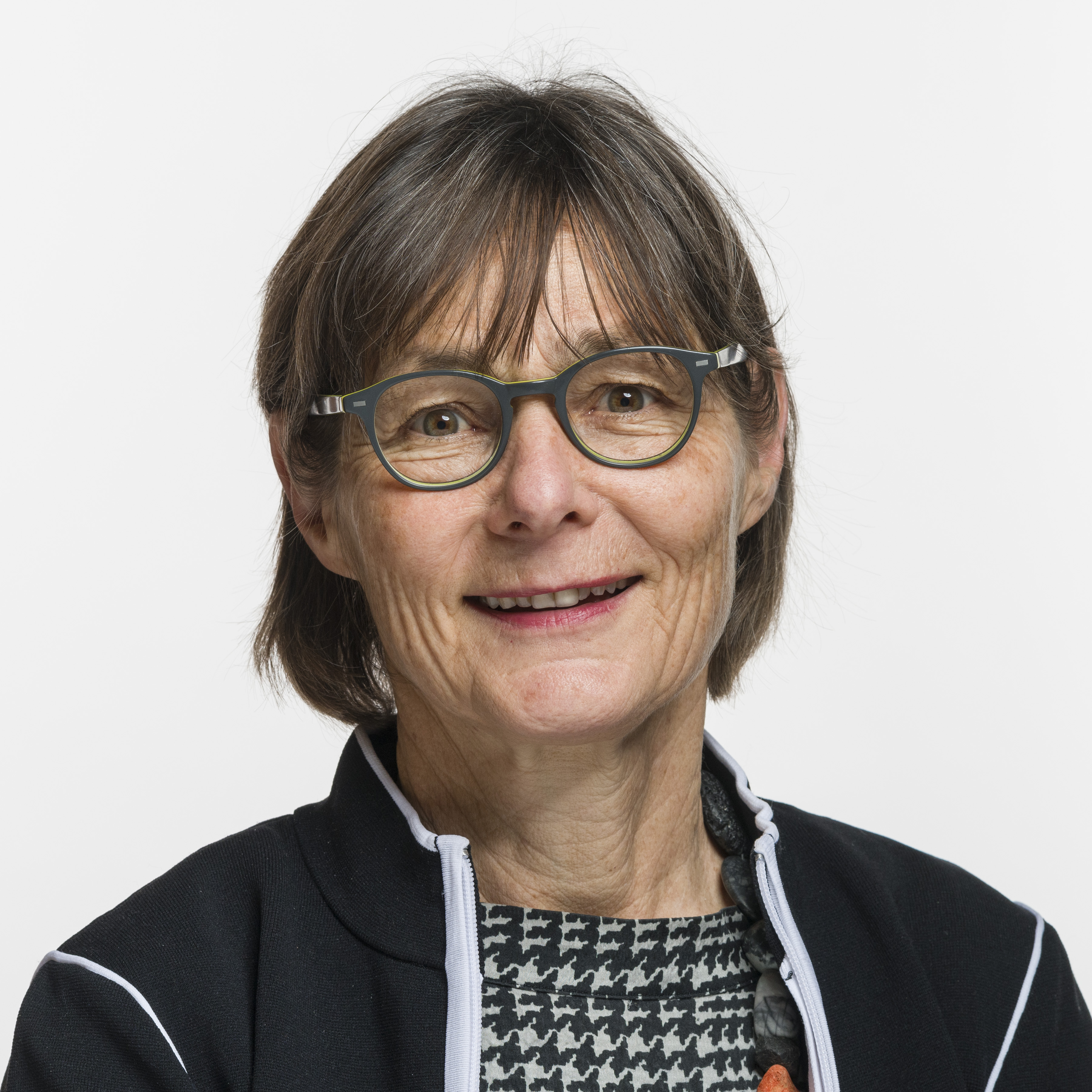
- 2019

Member of National Council (09.09.2013-01.12.2024)

Personal details
- Born: Martina Munz; 26 December 1955 (age 70) Zurich
- Citizenship: Switzerland
- Education: ETH Zurich
- Website: Official website Parliament website

Martina Munz (born 26 December 1955) is a Swiss politician and member of Social Democratic Party of Switzerland.

== Biography ==
Munz joined the Social Democratic Party of Switzerland in 1993. From 2000 to 2018 she was a member of the Cantonal Council of the Canton of Schaffhausen, from 2009 to 2015 she was president of the SP Schaffhausen. On 28 June 2016, she was elected President of the Swiss Alliance for GMO-Free Food (SAG).

On 9 September 2013, Munz replaced the resigned Hans-Jürg Fehr in the National Council. She resigned as a member of the National Council at the end of November 2024. Her successor is Linda de Ventura.

Munz studied agricultural sciences at ETH Zurich and was a vocational school teacher. She is a widow, mother of four children, and lives in Hallau.

On February 4, 2021, she took over the sponsorship of Yuliya Slutskaya, a Belarusian journalist and political prisoner. On September 28, 2021, she became the patron of Alena Talkachova, journalist of the Belarusian website Tut.by and political prisoner.

== See also ==
- List of members of the National Council of Switzerland (2023–2027)
- List of members of the National Council of Switzerland, 2019–2023
- List of members of the National Council of Switzerland, 2011–2015
- LGBTQ rights in Switzerland
- 2019 Swiss federal election
- Same-sex marriage in Switzerland
- List of members of the Federal Assembly from the Canton of Schaffhausen
