= Fritz Göttisheim =

Swiss politician

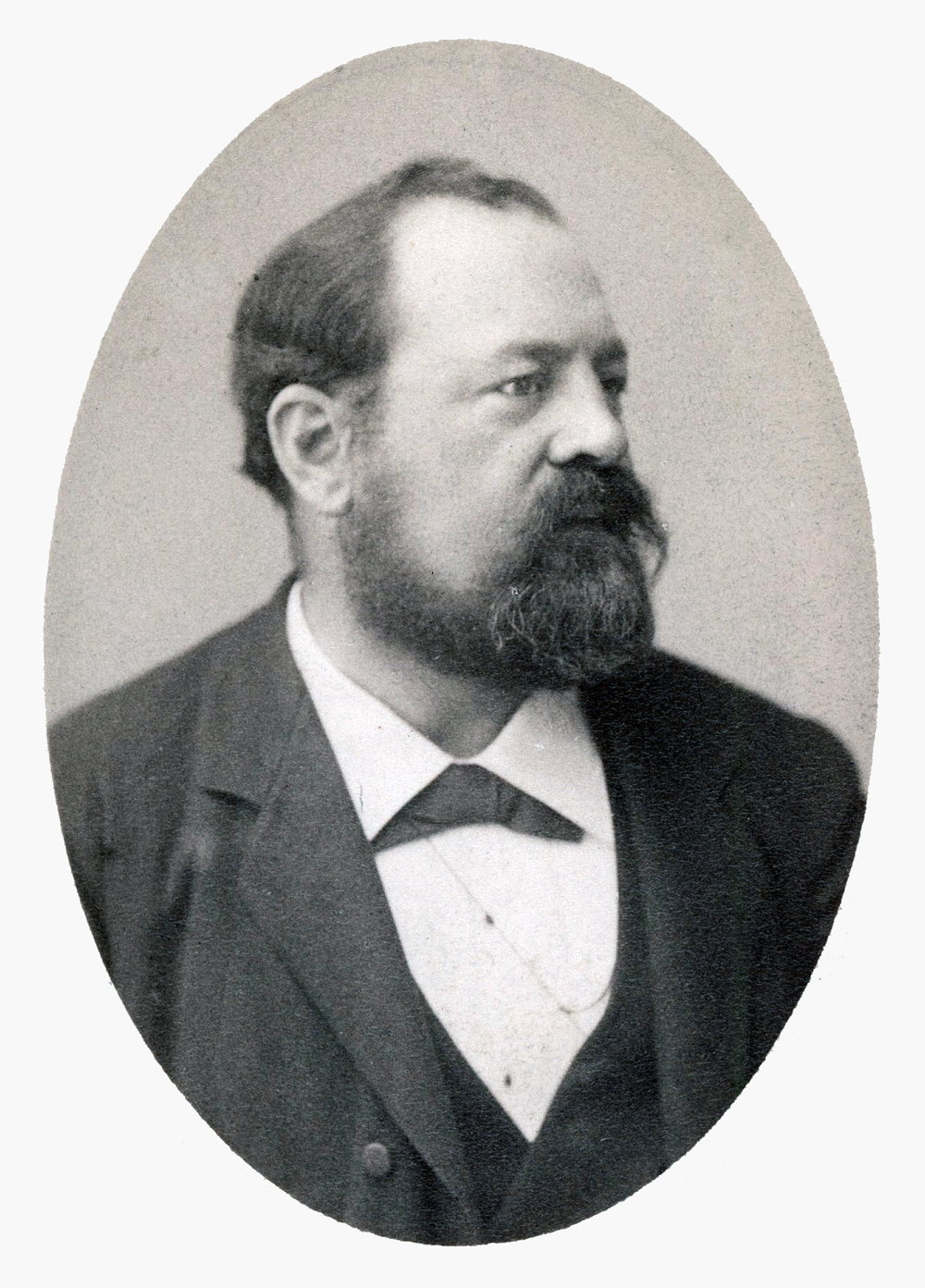
- Fritz Göttisheim (date unknown)
- Born: 28 March 1837
- Died: 12 July 1896 (aged 59)

Christian Friedrich "Fritz" Göttisheim (28 March 1837 – 12 July 1896) was a Swiss politician and President of the Swiss Council of States (1891/1892).

Preceded by Armin Kellersberger	President of the Council of States; 1891/1892	Succeeded by Henri Gaspard de Schaller
