= Theodor Wirz =

Swiss politician (1842–1901)

Theodor Wirz (21 August 1842, Sarnen – 13 September 1901) was a Swiss politician and President of the Swiss Council of States (1884/1885).

His brother Adalbert Wirz presided the same council in 1906/1907.

Preceded by Martin Birmann	President of the Council of States; 1884/1885	Succeeded by Esajas Zweifel
