= Johann Jakob Sulzer =

Swiss industrialist and politician (1821–1897)

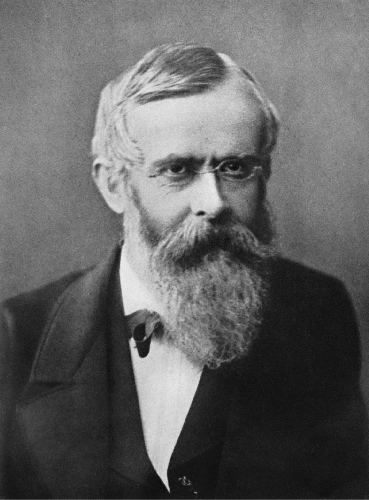
Portrait of Johann Jakob Sulzer

Johann Jakob Sulzer (23 December 1821 – 27 June 1897) was a Swiss politician, mayor of Winterthur (1858–1873) and President of the Swiss Council of States (1876).

He was the son of Johann Jakob Sulzer Sr., founder of Sulzer (manufacturer).

Preceded by Numa Droz	President of the Council of States; 1876	Succeeded by Paul Nagel
