= Gustav Muheim =

Swiss politician

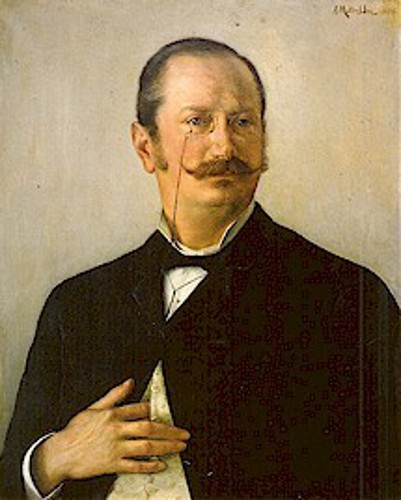
Gustav Muheim

Gustav Muheim (11 September 1851, Altdorf, Uri – 4 April 1917) was a Swiss politician and President of the Swiss Council of States (1890).

Preceded by Karl J. Hoffmann	President of the Council of States; 1890	Succeeded by Armin Kellersberger
