= Stržišče, Tolmin =

Stržišče
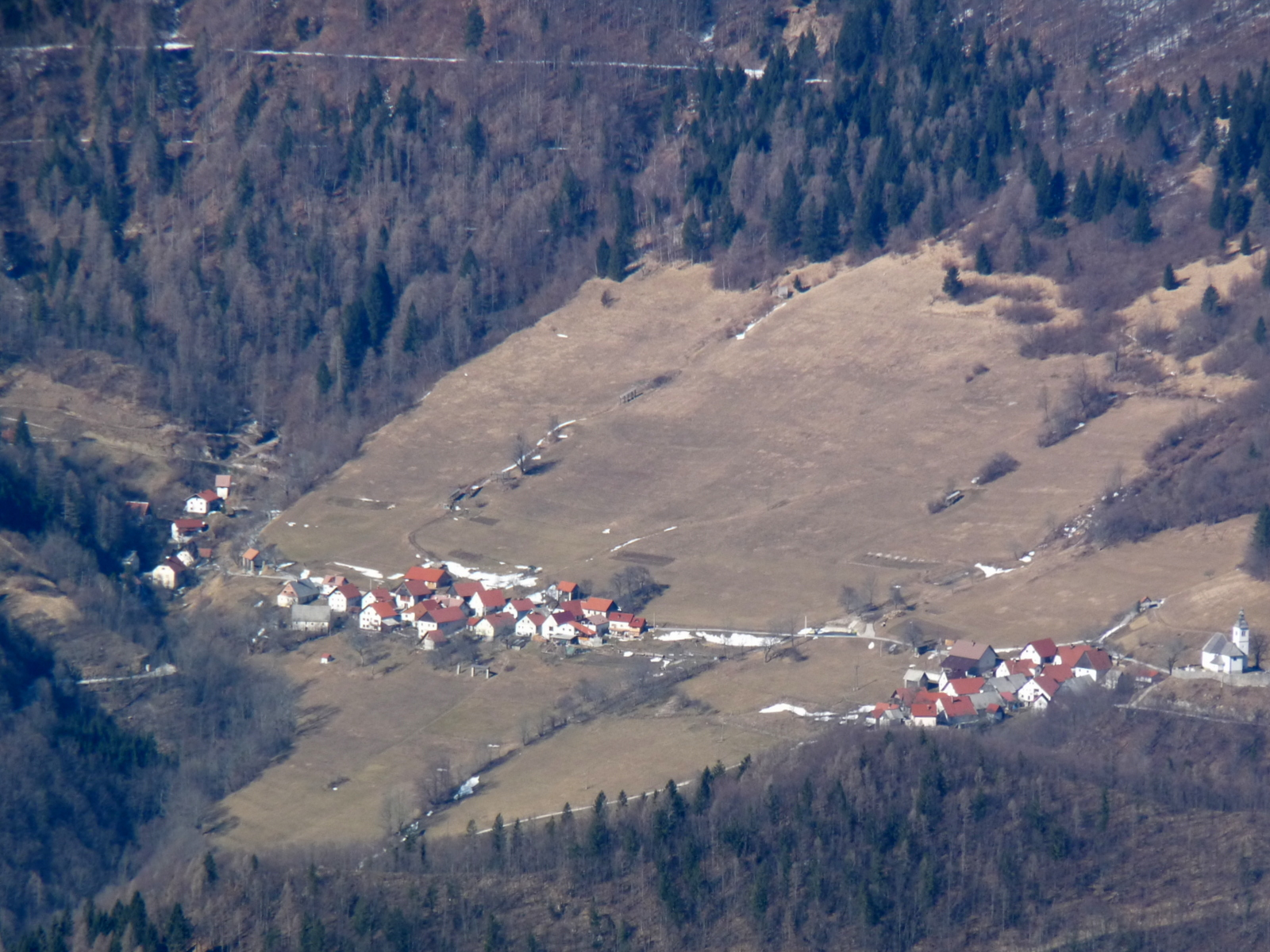

- Location in Slovenia
- Coordinates: 46°12′48.56″N 13°55′21.74″E
- Country: Slovenia
- Traditional region: Slovenian Littoral
- Statistical region: Gorizia
- Municipality: Tolmin

Area
  - Total: 6.76 km^{2} (2.61 sq mi)
- Elevation: 754.5 m (2,475 ft)

Population (2002)
  - Total: 41

Stržišče (pronounced [stəɾˈʒiːʃtʃɛ]) is a settlement in the hills north of Hudajužna in the Municipality of Tolmin in the Littoral region of Slovenia.

The parish church in the settlement is dedicated to Saint Oswald and belongs to the Diocese of Koper.
