= Karl Hoffmann (politician) =

Swiss politician (1820–1895)

President of the Council of States
- In office 1889–1890
- Preceded by: Heinrich Gustav Schoch
- Succeeded by: Gustav Muheim
- In office 1877–1878
- Preceded by: Paul Nagel
- Succeeded by: Antoine Vessaz

Personal details
- Born: Karl Jakob Hoffmann; 2 February 1820; St. Gallen, Canton of St. Gallen, Switzerland
- Died: 18 December 1895 (aged 75); St. Gallen, Canton of St. Gallen, Switzerland
- Political party: Free Democratic Party
- Children: Arthur

Karl Jakob Hoffmann (2 February 1820 – 18 December 1895) was a Swiss politician of the Free Democratic Party who was President of the Swiss Council of States (1877/1878 and 1889/1890).

After studying law in Bern, Jena and Munich, Karl Hoffmann obtained a doctorate in 1839 and became a lawyer in St. Gallen (1840–1891). He was elected to the Grand Council of the Canton of St. Gallen between 1853 and 1870, and again between 1873 and 1895. In parallel, he was elected to the Council of States between 1873 in 1891.

On 22 February 1881, he was elected to the Swiss Federal Council but declined the election for family reasons.

His son Arthur Hoffmann (1857–1927) was a member of the Federal Council (1911–1917).

== Works ==
- Hahn, Theodor; Hoffmann, Karl Jakob (1863). Offene Briefe von und an Theodor Hahn und Fürspr. Hoffmann, oder Rechts- und Sittenzustände im Kt. St. Gall 1863 (in German). St. Gallen.
- Hoffmann, Karl Jakob (1883). Ueber das Schweizerische Obligationenrecht: Oeffentlicher Vortrag. Mit Einwilligung des Vortragenden nach stenographischen Aufzeichnungen veröffentlicht (in German). St. Gallen: Th. Wirth.
- Hoffmann, Karl Jakob; Hafner, Heinrich (1887). Rechtsgutachten der Herren Ständerat Dr. K. Hoffmann in St. Gallen und Bundesrichter Dr. H. Hafner in Lausanne über die Rechtsnatur der appenzell ausserrhodischen Zedel: deren faustpfandliche Verwendung und Amortisation, sowie über die Verpfändung und Amortisation der grundversicherten Forderungen überhaupt (in German).

Preceded by Paul Nagel	President of the Council of States; 1877/1878	Succeeded by Antoine Vessaz
Preceded by Gustav Schoch	President of the Council of States; 1889/1890	Succeeded by Gustav Muheim
