= Charles Friderich =

Swiss politician

Charles Marie Friderich (20 March 1828, Geneva – 9 January 1880) was a Swiss politician and President of the Swiss National Council (1872). He belonged to the Liberal Centre, which later developed into the Liberal Party of Switzerland.

Preceded by Rudolf Brunner	President of the National Council; 1872	Succeeded by Daniel Wirth-Sand
