= Henri Gaspard de Schaller =

Swiss politician

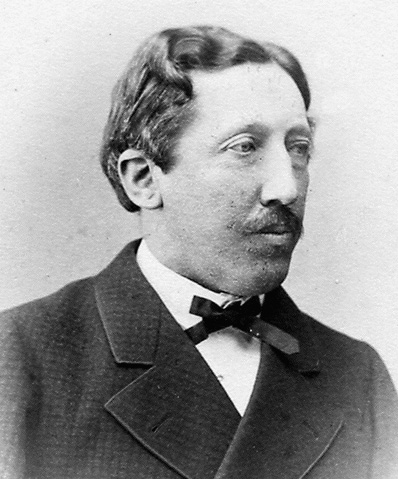
Henri Gaspard de Schaller

Henri Gaspard de Schaller (8 October 1828 – 18 May 1900) was a Swiss politician and President of the Swiss Council of States (1892/1893).

Preceded by Fritz Göttisheim	President of the Council of States; 1892/1893	Succeeded by Friedrich Eggli
