= Paul Nagel (politician) =

Swiss politician (1831–1880)

Paul Nagel (24 July 1831 – 10 September 1880) was a Swiss politician and president of the Swiss Council of States (1876/1877).

Preceded by Johann Jakob Sulzer	President of the Council of States; 1876/1877	Succeeded by Karl J. Hoffmann
