= Marc Fehlmann =

Swiss art historian

Curator of the Basel Historical Museum
- In office 1 June 2017 – 7 August 2020 (suspension)
- Preceded by: Gudrun Piller
- Succeeded by: Marc Zehntner

Personal details
- Born: Marc Fehlmann; 1965 (age 60–61) Basel, Switzerland
- Relations: Arnold Künzli (great-great-grandfather)
- Education: University of Basel; Courtauld Institute of Art; University of Zurich (PhD)
- Occupation: Art historian, curator

Marc Fehlmann (born 1965) is a Swiss art historian who served as Curator of the Basel Historical Museum from 2017 to 2020 until his suspension. He previously served as curatorial director of the Oskar Reinhart Collection as well as concurrently of the German Historical Museum.

== Early life and education ==
Fehlmann was born in 1965 in Basel, Switzerland, the younger of two children, to Peter Olaf Fehlmann, a textile merchant, and Ursula Fehlmann (née Kunath; 1928–2026), into an affluent Protestant family. He had an older brother, Thomas Niklaus Fehlmann (1960–1992) and two half-sisters Susanne Hemmerle (née Fehlmann; 1954–1993) and Corinne Bösch (née Fehlmann; born 1956).

His paternal family originally hails from Schöftland where they were active in the textile industry. His maternal family originally hailed from Lower Saxony, Germany. His maternal grandfather, Fritz Kunath (1897–1938), settled in Switzerland in the 1920s, and became a pioneer of the animal nutrition industry.

After his Matura (secondary school diploma), Fehlmann completed traineeships at Galerie Kornfeld in Bern as well as from 1987 to 1989 at Sotheby's in London. He then studied classical archaeology, art history and english literature at the University of Basel and the University of Zurich. Between 1994 and 1995, he completed additional studies at Courtauld Institute of Art. In 1998, Fehlmann completed his PhD under Franz Zelger at the University of Zurich.
