= Karl Rudolf Stehlin =

Swiss politician

Karl Rudolf Stehlin (13 January 1831 in Basel – 12 July 1881) was a Swiss politician and President of the Swiss Council of States (1879/1880).

He was the son of Johann Jakob Stehlin (1803–1879).

Preceded by Florian Gengel	President of the Council of States; 1879/1880	Succeeded by Christian Sahli
