= Martin Birmann =

Swiss politician

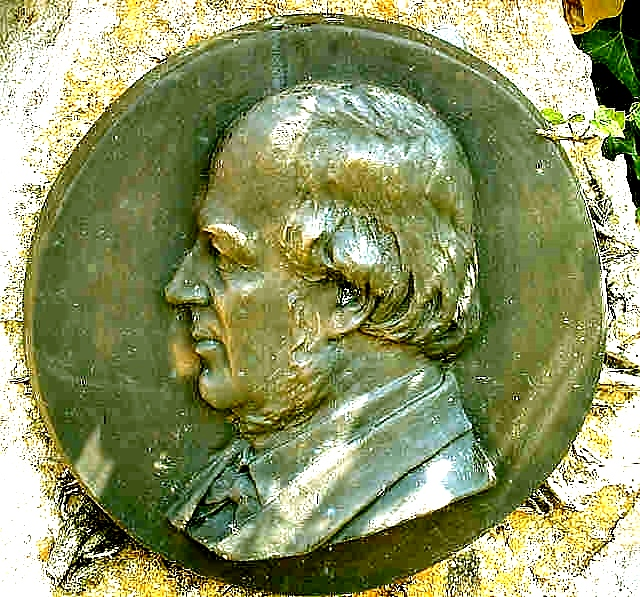
Birmann on a plaque at Rünenberg

Martin Birmann (26 November 1828 – 19 August 1890) was a Swiss politician and President of the Swiss Council of States (1884).

Preceded by Walter Hauser	President of the Council of States; 1884	Succeeded by Theodor Wirz
