= Antoine Vessaz =

Swiss politician (1833–1911)

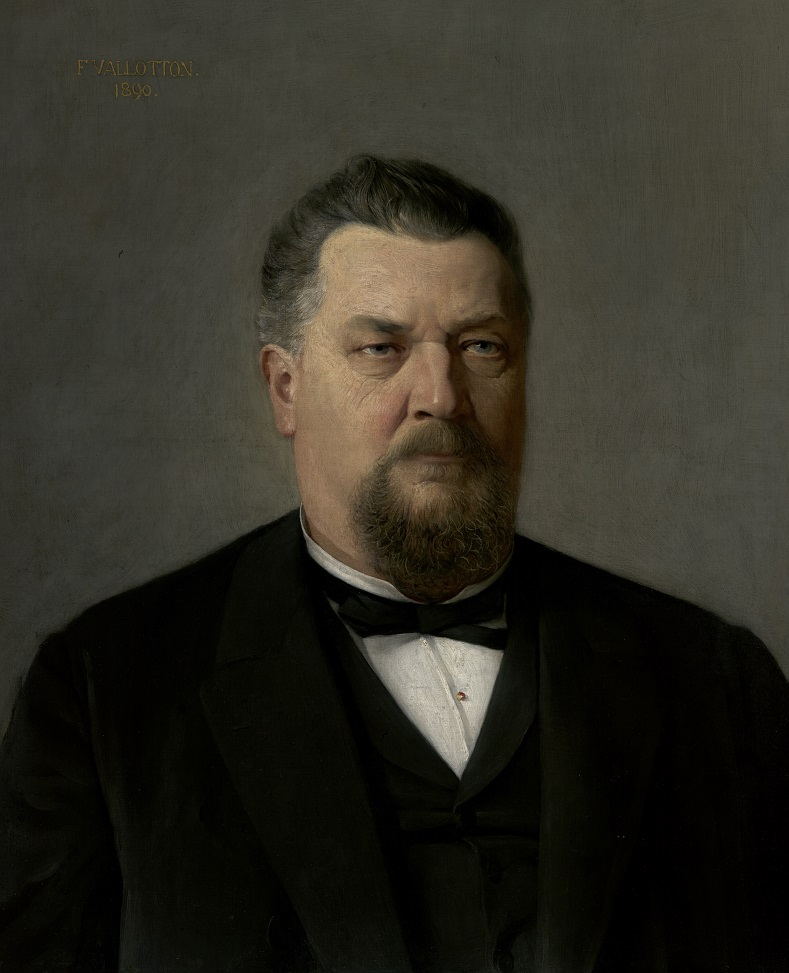
Antoine Vessaz painted by Félix Vallotton

Philippe Antoine Vessaz (20 June 1833 – 25 October 1911) was a Swiss politician and President of the Swiss Council of States (1878) and National Council (1881).

Preceded by Karl J. Hoffmann	President of the Council of States; 1878	Succeeded by Florian Gengel
Preceded by Karl Burckhardt	President of the National Council; 1881	Succeeded by Karl Zyro
