= Alexandre Gavard =

Swiss politician

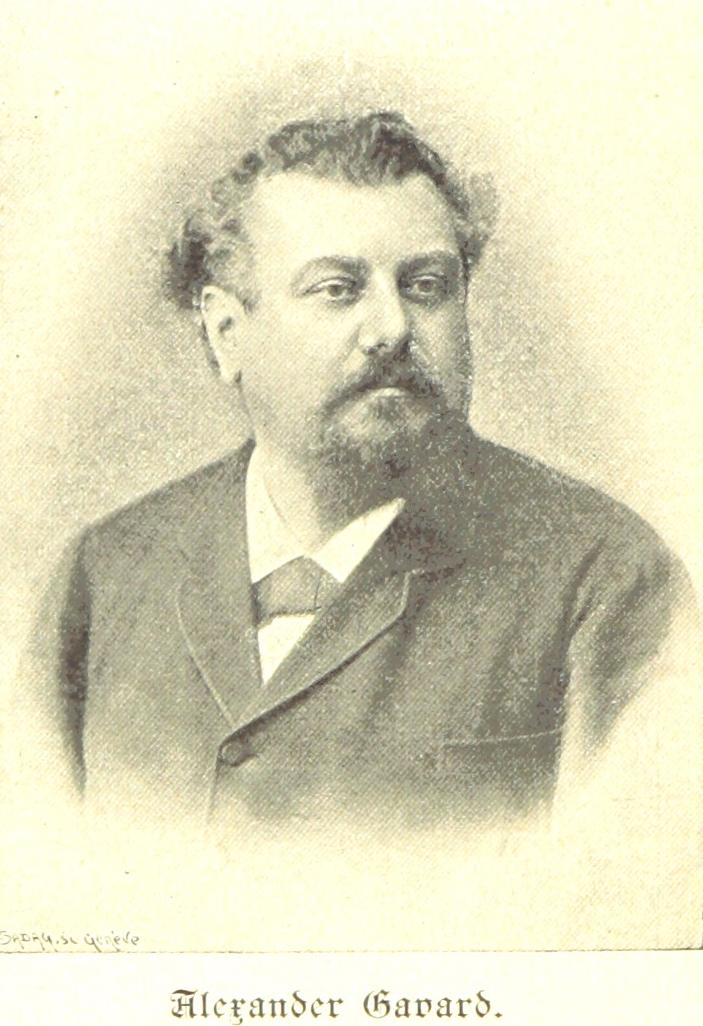
Alexandre Gavard.

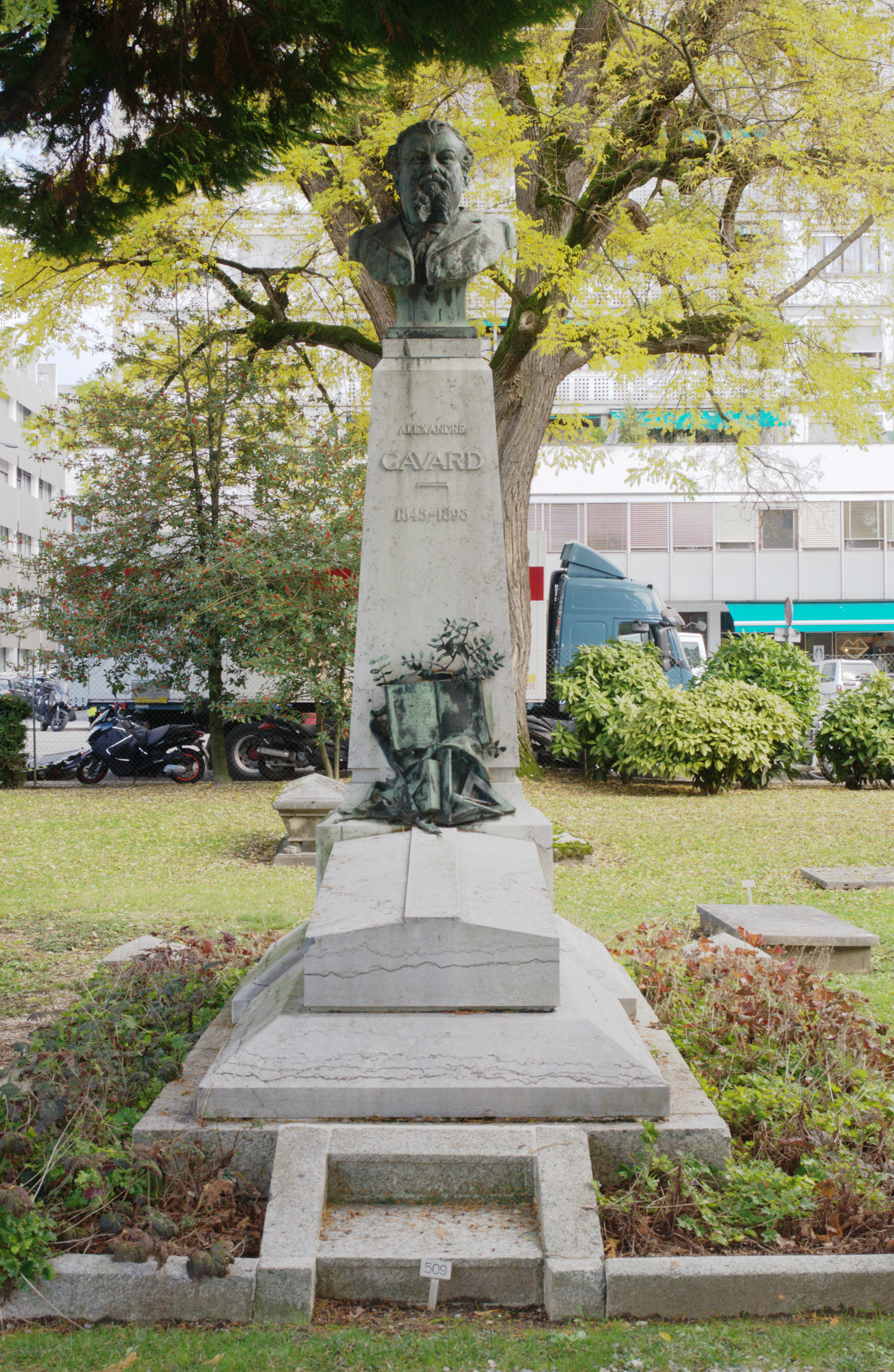
Tomb of Alexandre Gavard, Kings Cemetery, Geneva.

Alexandre Gavard (25 March 1845 – 29 November 1898) was a Swiss politician and President of the Swiss Council of States (1887/88). He taught in Carouge 1864–1872.

Rue Alexandre-Gavard in Carouge is named after him.

Preceded by Adam Herzog-Weber	President of the Council of States; 1887/1888	Succeeded by Gustav Schoch
