= Alphonse Bory =

Swiss politician

Alphonse Bory (15 October 1838 – 8 April 1891) was a Swiss politician and President of the Swiss Council of States from 1886 to 1887.

Preceded by Esajas Zweifel	President of the Council of States; 1886/1887	Succeeded by Albert Scherb
