= Florian Gengel =

Swiss politician

Florian Gengel (27 June 1834 in Churwalden – 4 February 1905) was a Swiss politician and President of the Swiss Council of States (1878/1879).

== Works ==
- Gengel, Florian (1864). Aphorismen über demokratisches Staatsrecht (in German). Bern: Jent & Reinert.
- Gengel, Florian (1868). Die Erweiterung der Volksrechte (in German). Bern: Jent & Reinert.
- Gengel, Florian (1868). Die Erweiterung der Volksrechte: Besprechung im Verein der Liberalen Bern's (in German). Bern: Jent & Reinert.
- Gengel, Florian (1868). Zur schweizerischen Reformbewegung: Die Selbstregierung des Volkes. Vortrag bei Besprechung der Erweiterung der Volksrechte (in German). Jent & Reinert.

Preceded by Antoine Vessaz	President of the Council of States; 1878/1879	Succeeded by Karl Rudolf Stehlin
