= Armin Kellersberger =

Swiss politician

Armin Josef Julius Kellersberger (18 December 1838 – 28 July 1905) was a Swiss politician and President of the Swiss Council of States (1890/1891).

Preceded by Gustav Muheim	President of the Council of States; 1890/1891	Succeeded by Fritz Göttisheim
