= Feer =

Feer is a given name and a surname. Notable people with the name include:

== First name ==
- Feer Khan Shujauddin, 33rd Da'i al-Mutlaq

== Surname ==
- Khanji Feer, Indian Ismaili Dawoodi Bohra saint
- Carl Feer-Herzog (1820–1880), Swiss politician

== See also ==
- Leew Eilun Feer, insular anthem of Föhr
