= Esajas Zweifel =

Swiss politician

Esajas Zweifel (27 March 1827 – 27 February 1904) was a Swiss politician and President of the Swiss Council of States (1885/1886).

Preceded by Theodor Wirz	President of the Council of States; 1885/1886	Succeeded by Alphonse Bory
