= Karl von Zois =

Carniolan botanist and plant collector (1756–1799)

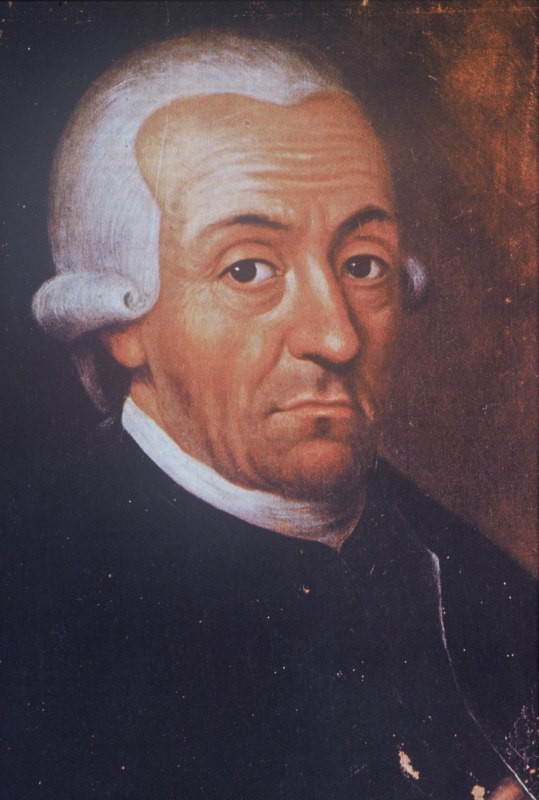
- Born: November 18, 1756; Ljubljana, Archduchy of Austria, Holy Roman Empire
- Died: October 29, 1799 (aged 42); Trieste, Holy Roman Empire
- Scientific career
- Fields: Botany

Karl von Zois zu Laibach (18 November 1756 – 29 October 1799) was a Carniolan amateur botanist and plant collector. He is best known today as the namesake of zoysiagrass, which was named by Carl Ludwig Willdenow in 1801. The bellflower Campanula zoysii is also named after him.

Karl von Zois was born in Ljubljana and baptized Carolus Philippus Eugenius Zoiss. The Zois family was of Lombard origin; Karl's father was Michelangelo Zois (1694–1777), a merchant who married a Carniolan noblewoman, and was nobilitated in 1739. The family was based in Ljubljana (German: Laibach). His brother was the natural scientist and patron of the arts Sigmund Zois.
