= Adam Herzog =

Swiss politician

Adam Herzog-Weber (12 May 1829 – 2 August 1895) was a Swiss politician and President of the Swiss Council of States (1887).

Preceded by Albert Scherb	President of the Council of States; 1887	Succeeded by Alexandre Gavard
