= Franz Wicki =

Swiss politician

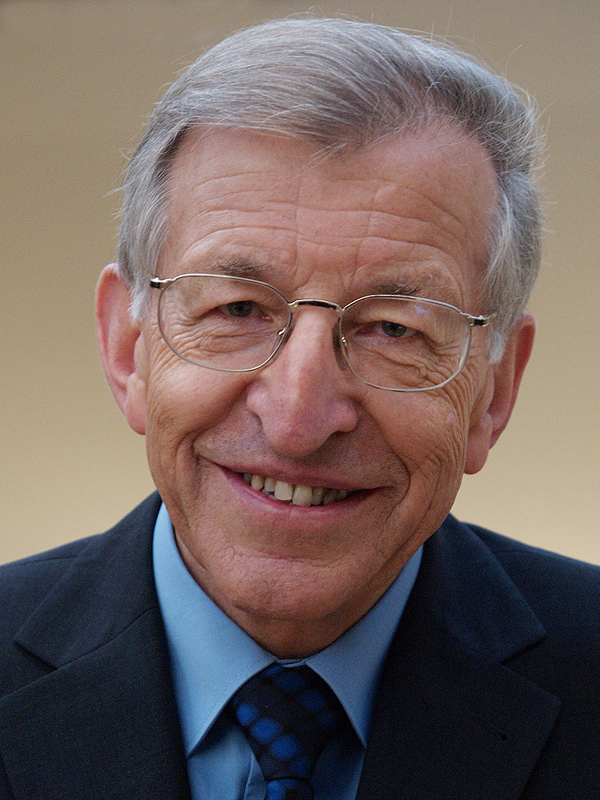
Franz Wicki

Franz Wicki (born 28 January 1939) is a Swiss politician, lawyer and member of the Swiss Council of States (1995–2007).

Wicki is a member of the Christian Democratic People's Party (CVP/PDC). From 1979 to 1995, he was part of the cantonal parliament of Lucerne, of which he was president in 1992. From 1995 to 2007, he was a member of the Swiss Council of States.

After studying law at the University of Fribourg (Switzerland) and Freiburg (Germany), he has been an attorney and notary public in Sursee since 1966. He was a judge of the cantonal insurance court (1969–1973) and the administrative court (1973–1995).

Wicki is married and a father of three. He is a citizen of Grosswangen.
