= Arnold Künzli =

Swiss politician (1832–1908)

- Official portrait, 1889

Member of the National Council (Switzerland)
- In office 6 December 1869 – 9 November 1908
- Preceded by: Emanuel Herosé
- Succeeded by: Hans Suter
- Constituency: Canton of Aargau

Personal details
- Born: Johann Friedrich Arnold Künzli; 20 June 1832 Riken, Switzerland (now Murgenthal, Switzerland)
- Died: 9 November 1908 (aged 76) Murgenthal, Switzerland
- Party: Free Democratic Party
- Spouse: Maria Elisabeth Nussbaum (m. 1869; died 1886)
- Relations: Marc Fehlmann (great-great-grandson)
- Children: 6
- Education: Old Cantonal School Aarau
- Occupation: Industrialist, philanthropist, politician

Military service
- Allegiance: Switzerland
- Rank: Colonel

Johann Friedrich Arnold Künzli colloquially Arnold Künzli (20 June 1832 – 9 November 1908) was a Swiss industrialist, philanthropist and politician who most notably served on the National Council (Switzerland) from 1869 to 1908 (his death). In 1879, he concurrently served as President of the National Council.

== Early life and education ==
Künzli was born 20 June 1832 in Riken, Switzerland, the third of five children, to Johann Hartmann Künzli (1804–1867), a textile manufacturer, and Anna Barbara Künzli (née Gugelmann; 1809–1865), into an affluent Protestant family.

Künzli attended the Old Cantonal School Aarau followed by a commercial apprenticeship at the firm of Hans Jacobi in Geneva.

== Personal life ==
In 1869, Künzli married Maria Elisabeth Nussbaum (1837–1886), a daughter of Rudolf Nussbaum, an affluent manufacturer, who was the proprietor of the Nussbaum dyeing works in Birrwil on Lake Hallwil. They had six children;

- Elisa Marie Künzli (1870–1909), married Jakob Weber (1862–1963), textile industrialist and colonel, of Murgenthal, with issue.
- Anna Frieda Künzli (1872–1872)
- Emma Margaretha Künzli (1872–1972), married to Caesar "Theodor" Fehlmann (1875–1960), textile manufacturer of Schöftland and Birrwil, with issue. Among her great-grandsons is the art historian Marc Fehlmann.
- Anna Julia Künzli (1874–1949), married Oskar Heinrich Weber (1868–1952), industrialist and president of Metallwaren Zug with issue.
- Anna Frieda Künzli (1876–1879), twin of Samuel
- Samuel Arnold Künzli (1876–1879), twin of Anna

Künzli passed away 9 November 1908 in Murgenthal, Switzerland aged 76.

Preceded by Melchior Römer	President of the National Council; 1879/1880	Succeeded by Karl Burckhardt
