= Erwin Muff =

Swiss politician (1935–2019)

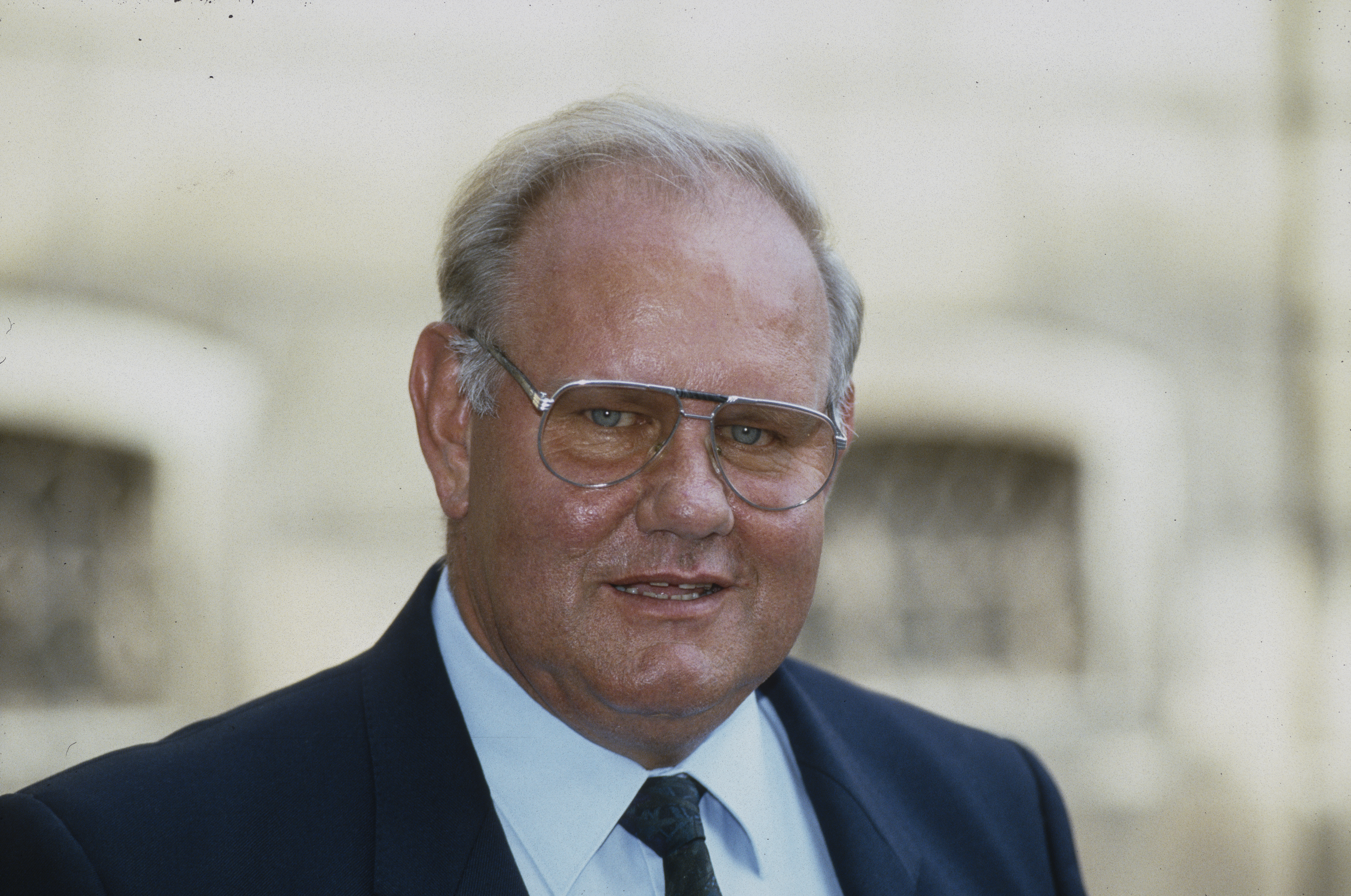

Member of the National Council of Switzerland
- In office 29 November 1971 – 1 December 1981

Personal details
- Born: 1 June 1935 Sulz, Lucerne, Switzerland
- Died: 27 June 2019 (aged 84) Willisau, Switzerland
- Party: Free Democratic Party of Switzerland; FDP.The Liberals
- Occupation: Politician / Farmer

Erwin Muff (1 June 1935 - 27 June 2019) was a Swiss politician. Muff served as a member of the National Council of Switzerland from 1971 to 1981.

He graduated from the Swiss Federal Institute of Technology in Zurich in 1961 and became a teach of agriculture and business in Willisau. He was a councilor on the Grand Council of Lucerne from 1967 to 1971. in 1971 he was elected with the Free Democratic Party of Switzerland to the National Council. He was re-elected in 1975 and 1979. He left the National Council in 1981 and was elected to the Lucerne government council in 1982. He served in that post until 1995. After leaving politics, Muff stepped into a corporate career as president of Auto AG Holding Rothenburg from 1995 to 2005 and president of Centralschweizerische Kraftwerke Luzern, the local electric utility.

Muff died on 27 June 2019 at the age of 84 in Willistau.
