= Albert Scherb =

Swiss politician

Jakob Albert Scherb (5 May 1839, Hüttlingen – 18 September 1908) was a Swiss politician and President of the Swiss Council of States (1887).

Preceded by Alphonse Bory	President of the Council of States; 1887	Succeeded by Adam Herzog-Weber
