= Karl Burckhardt =

Swiss politician

Karl Burckhardt-Iselin (2 July 1830 in Basel – 24 August 1893) was a Swiss politician and President of the Swiss National Council (1880/1881).

Preceded by Arnold Künzli	President of the National Council; 1880/1881	Succeeded by Antoine Vessaz
