= Carl Feer-Herzog =

Swiss politician

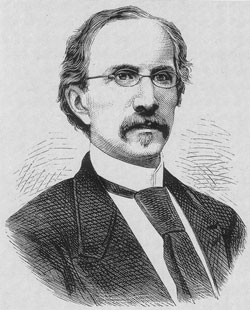
- Official portrait, c. 1874

President of the National Council (Switzerland)
- In office 1 January 1874 – 31 December 1874
- Constituency: Canton of Aargau

Member of the National Council (Switzerland)
- In office 7 December 1857 – 14 January 1880 (his death)

Personal details
- Born: Carl Feer; 23 January 1820 Rixheim, France
- Died: 14 January 1880 (aged 59) Aarau, Switzerland
- Party: Centre; Liberal
- Spouse: Caroline Herzog (m. 1849)
- Children: 6
- Occupation: Businessman, railway pioneer, bibliophile, politician

Carl Feer-Herzog (23 October 1820 – 14 January 1880) was a Swiss businessman, railway pioneer, bibliophile and politician who served on the National Council (Switzerland) from 1857 to 1880 (his death). He concurrently served as President of the National Council in 1874.

== Early life and education ==
Feer was born 23 October 1820 in Rixheim, France, the oldest of seven children, to Niklaus "Friedrich" Feer (1790–1865), a silk ribbon manufacturer, and his second wife Esther Feer (née Heusler; 1794–1847), originally from Basel, into an affluent Protestant family.

His paternal family were originally Bernese small farmers which were settled and held municipal citizenship in Brugg since 1627. Researchers believe that there potentially is a distant relation to the Patrician Feer family of Lucerne. His father, Friedrich, emigrated to Alsace, where he became a partner in Zuber & Cie (his first wife was a Zuber) and then made a fortune through silk ribbon manufacturing (previously Meyer and Meyer & Feer in Aarau).

Feer completed a technical and scientific studies, initially at the University of Geneva, then at École Centrale Paris. During his studies he belonged to the Zofingia fraternity, one of the oldest and largest student fraternities in Switzerland.

== Career ==
In 1841, Feer entered the paternal silk ribbon manufacturing company, in Aarau, which then was among the largest and most prosperous enterprises of the city. In 1845, he became a partner and administrative director. During those years, Feer became independently wealthy, and belonged among the few millionaires in the Canton of Aargau, ultimately selling his stakes in the business in 1865.

In 1852, Feer launched his political career as he was elected into the Grand Council of Aargau. He remained in that office until his death and served twice as its president in 1853/54 and 1872/73. He concurrently served as member of the National Council (Switzerland) from 1857 to 1880 (once as president in 1874).

== Personal life ==
In 1849, Feer married Caroline Herzog (1821–1890), daughter of Johann Jakob Herzog (1789–1862) and Sophia Herzog (née Hartmann; 1796–1824), of Aarau. She was a granddaughter of Johannes Herzog of Aarau. They had six children:

- Johann Jakob Feer (1851–1913)
- Carl Feer (1854–1923)
- Heinrich Feer (1857–1892)
- Sophia Feer (born 1860)
- Feer (1864–1864)
- Gaston Feer (1864–1936)

| Preceded by Gottlieb Ziegler | President of the National Council; 1874 | Succeeded by Louis Ruchonnet |
