= Friedrich Eggli =

Swiss politician

Friedrich Eggli (7 November 1838 – 24 January 1895) was a Swiss politician and President of the Swiss Council of States (1893).

Preceded by Henri Schaller	President of the Council of States; 1893	Succeeded by Oskar Munzinger
