= Rudolf Brunner =

Swiss politician (1827–1894)

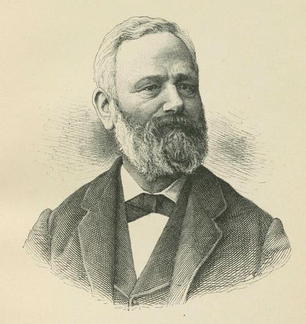
Rudolf Brunner (1888)

Rudolf Brunner (26 November 1827 – 11 March 1894) was a Swiss politician and President of the Swiss National Council (1871/1872).

Preceded by Fridolin Anderwert	President of the National Council; 1871/1872	Succeeded by Charles Friderich
