= Gottlieb Ziegler =

Swiss politician

Gottlieb Ziegler (9 August 1828 – 22 June 1898) was a Swiss politician and president of the Swiss National Council (1873/1874).

Preceded by Daniel Wirth-Sand	President of the National Council; 1873/1874	Succeeded by Carl Feer-Herzog
