= Daniel Wirth =

Swiss politician and businessman

Daniel Wirth-Sand (7 December 1815, Güttingen – 3 October 1901) was a Swiss politician and businessman. He presided the Swiss National Council in 1872/1873.

Preceded by Charles Friderich	President of the National Council; 1872/1873	Succeeded by Gottlieb Ziegler
