= Karl Zyro =

Swiss politician (1834–1896)

Karl Zyro (or Carl Samuel Zyro; 17 July 1834 – 26 August 1896) was a Swiss politician and president of the Swiss National Council (1881/1882). He worked as an attorney and notary public in Thun.

== Works ==
- Zyro, Karl (1878). Die Baugesellschaft Thun: Ein Beitrag zur Beurtheilung und Lösung der Thuner Tagesfrage (in German). Thun.

Preceded by Antoine Vessaz	President of the National Council; 1881/1882	Succeeded by Adolf Deucher
