= Heinrich Gustav Schoch =

Swiss politician

President of the Council of States
- In office 1888–1889
- Preceded by: Alexandre Gavard
- Succeeded by: Karl Hoffmann

Personal details
- Born: 1 January 1841
- Died: 11 May 1895 (aged 54)

Heinrich Gustav Schoch (1 January 1841 – 11 May 1895) was a Swiss politician and President of the Swiss Council of States (1888/1889).

== Works ==
- Schoch, Heinrich Gustav (1860). Kritische Betrachtung der neueren Doctrin und Gesetzgebung über die Verjährung der Strafen (in German). Schaffhausen: Brodtmann.

Preceded by Alexandre Gavard	President of the Council of States; 1888/1889	Succeeded by Karl J. Hoffmann
