= Hudajužna =

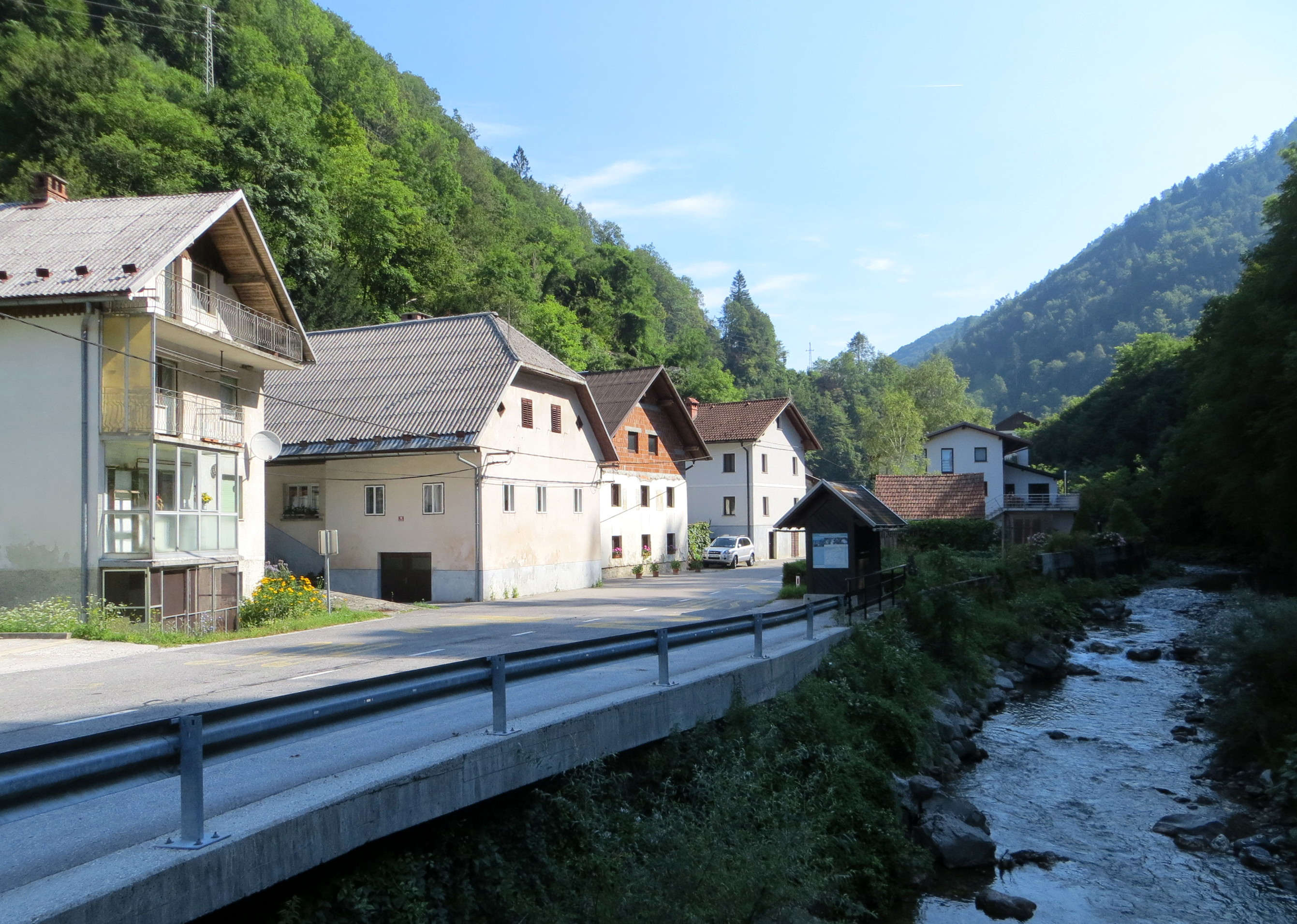

- Location in Slovenia
- Coordinates: 46°10′37.89″N 13°55′7.5″E
- Country: Slovenia
- Traditional region: Slovenian Littoral
- Statistical region: Gorizia
- Municipality: Tolmin

Area
  - Total: 3.14 km^{2} (1.21 sq mi)
- Elevation: 391.2 m (1,283 ft)

Population (2022)
  - Total: 78

Hudajužna (pronounced [xudaˈjuːʒna]; Italian: Villa Iùsina) is a village in the valley of the Bača River in the Municipality of Tolmin in the Littoral region of Slovenia. The Bohinj Railway line runs through the settlement.

== Name ==
The settlement was first attested in 1515 as Pochudauschna (and as Chuda Jusna in 1566, Cudaiusna in 1591, and per Hudeiusine in 1628). The name is a fused compound derived from *Huda južina (< hud 'intense, strong' + južina 'southern weather'), and thus refers to a local area that experienced the first significant thaw. The cadastral survey carried out under Emperor Francis I indicates that the name first referred to a rock shelter on Obloke Hill (Slovene: Obloški hrib) above the village, known as the place where the snow first melts away in spring. The adjective hud also means 'bad' and the noun južina 'lunch', and so popular imagination has created a story about how the name refers to an Ottoman attack on the village while the villagers were having lunch.

== Church ==
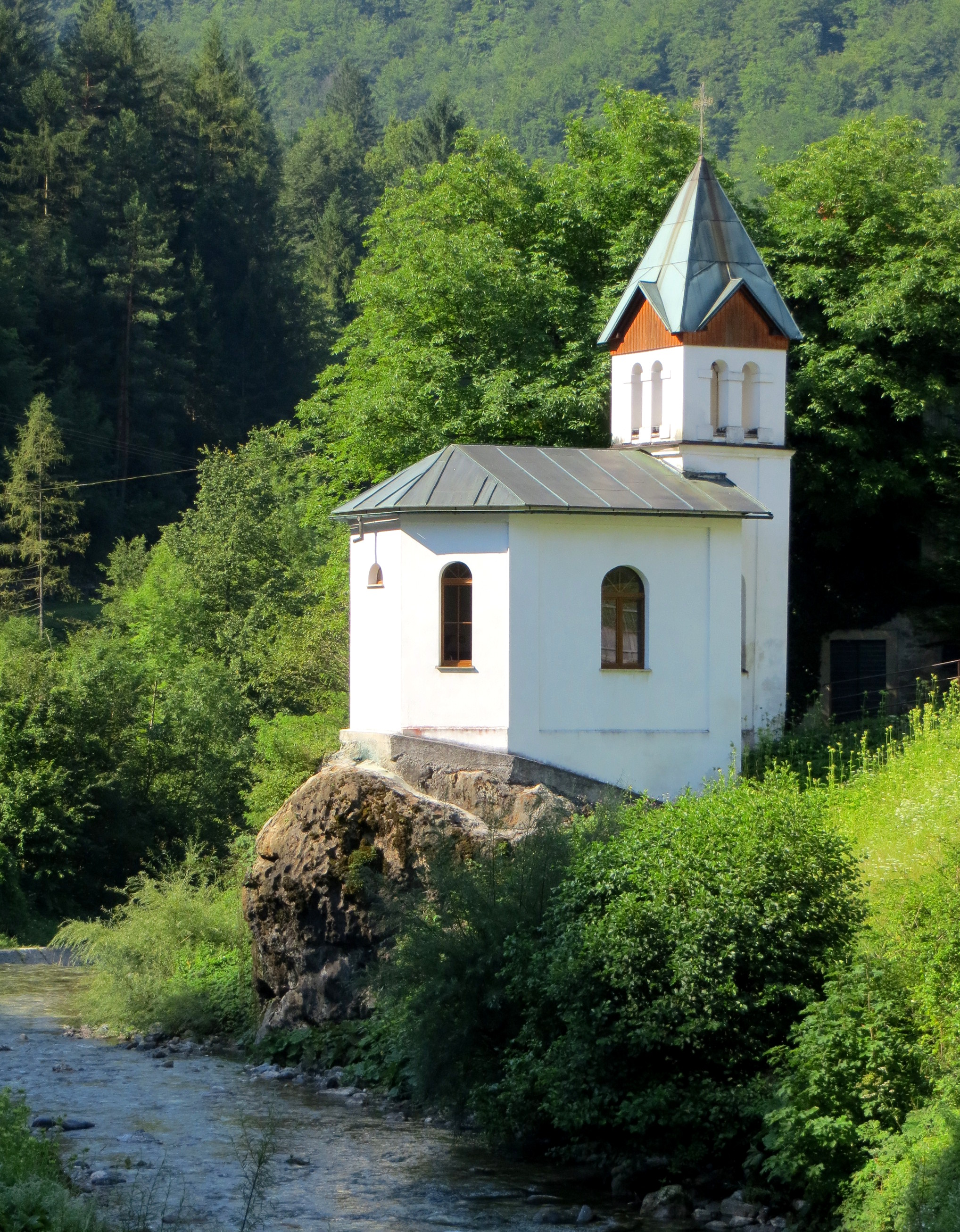
Saint Barbara's Church

The church in Hudajužna is dedicated to Saint Barbara. It was built in 1905 at the same time the railroad was built. It is a small building with a chancel walled on three sides and a nave through which the bell tower rises. It is roofed with sheet metal.

== Notable people ==
Notable people that were born or lived in Hudajužna include:

- Leopold Kemperle (1886–1950), journalist and editor
- Janez Kokošar (1860–1923), composer

== Gallery ==
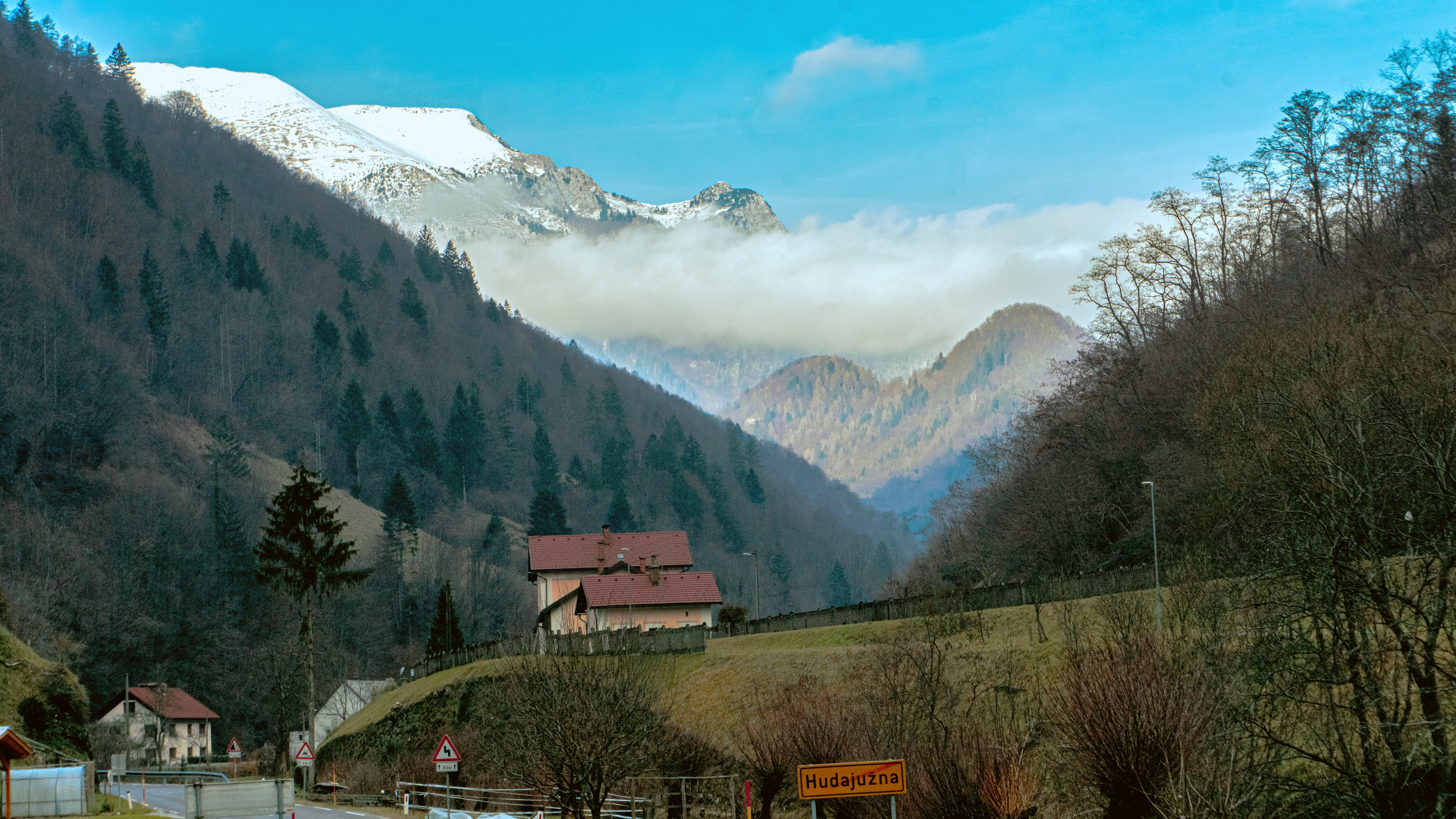
Hudajužna railway station

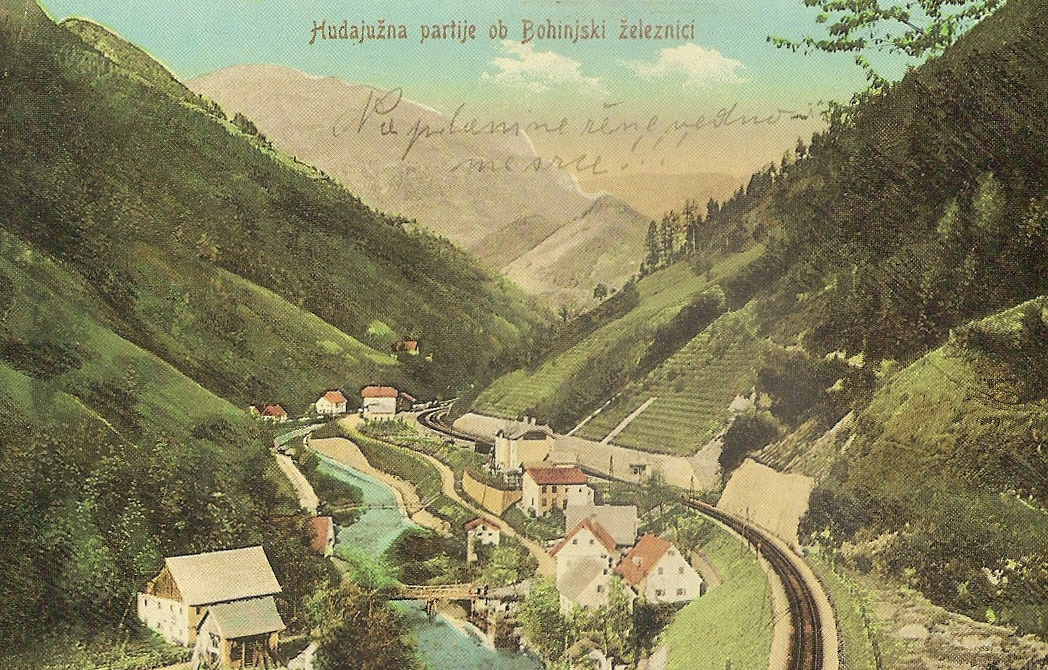
1915 postcard of Hudajužna
