= Wartensee railway station =

Train station in Switzerland

Wartensee
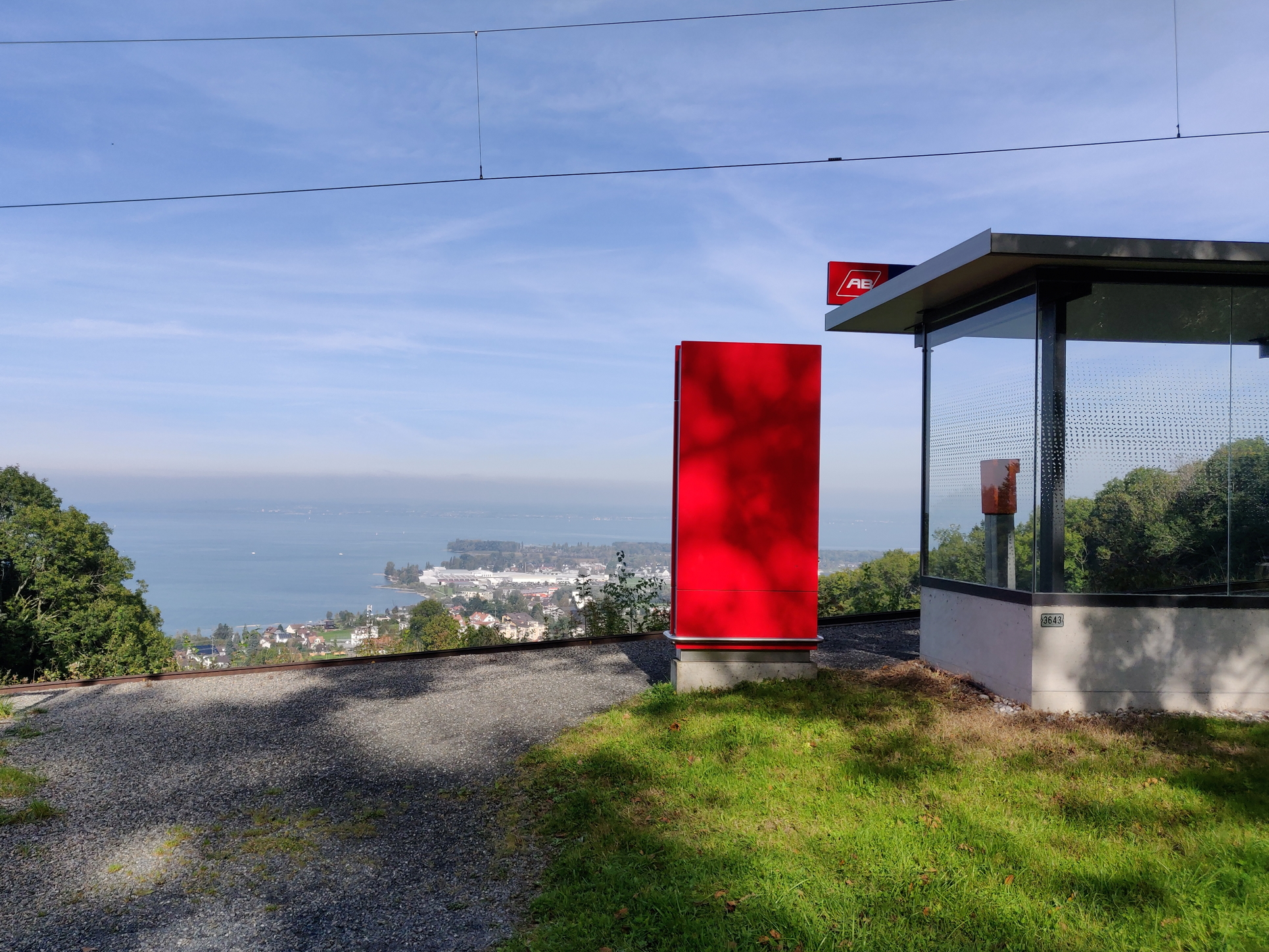
- The station in 2021

General information
- Location: Switzerland
- Coordinates: 47°28′19″N 9°32′02″E
- Elevation: 551 m (1,808 ft)
- Owner: Appenzell Railways
- Line: Rorschach–Heiden railway
- Train operators: Appenzell Railways

Other information
- Fare zone: 231 (Tarifverbund Ostwind)

Services
Preceding station	St. Gallen S-Bahn	Following station
Sandbüchel towards Rorschach Hafen	S25	Wienacht-Tobel towards Heiden
Location
- Location within Switzerland Location within Canton of St. Gallen

Wartensee railway station (German: Bahnhof Wartensee) is a railway station in Thal, in the Swiss canton of St. Gallen. It is a station on the Rorschach–Heiden mountain rack railway line of Appenzell Railways.

== Services ==
As of the December 2023 timetable change, the following services stop at Wartensee (only on request):

- St. Gallen S-Bahn:
  - S25: hourly service to Rorschach Hafen via Rorschach, and to Heiden.
