= Seebleiche railway station =

Train station in Switzerland

Seebleiche

General information
- Location: Switzerland
- Coordinates: 47°28′41″N 9°30′58″E
- Elevation: 415 m (1,362 ft)
- Owner: Appenzell Railways
- Line: Rorschach–Heiden railway
- Train operators: Appenzell Railways

Other information
- Fare zone: 231 (Tarifverbund Ostwind)

Services
Preceding station	St. Gallen S-Bahn	Following station
Rorschach towards Rorschach Hafen	S25	Sandbüchel towards Heiden
Location
- Location within Switzerland Location within Canton of St. Gallen

Seebleiche railway station (German: Bahnhof Seebleiche) is a railway station in Rorschacherberg, in the Swiss canton of St. Gallen. It is a station on the Rorschach–Heiden mountain rack railway line of Appenzell Railways.

== Services ==
As of the December 2023 timetable change, the following services stop at Seebleiche (only on request):

- St. Gallen S-Bahn:
  - S25: hourly service to Rorschach Hafen via Rorschach, and to Heiden.
