= Schwendi bei Heiden railway station =

Train station in Switzerland

Schwendi bei Heiden
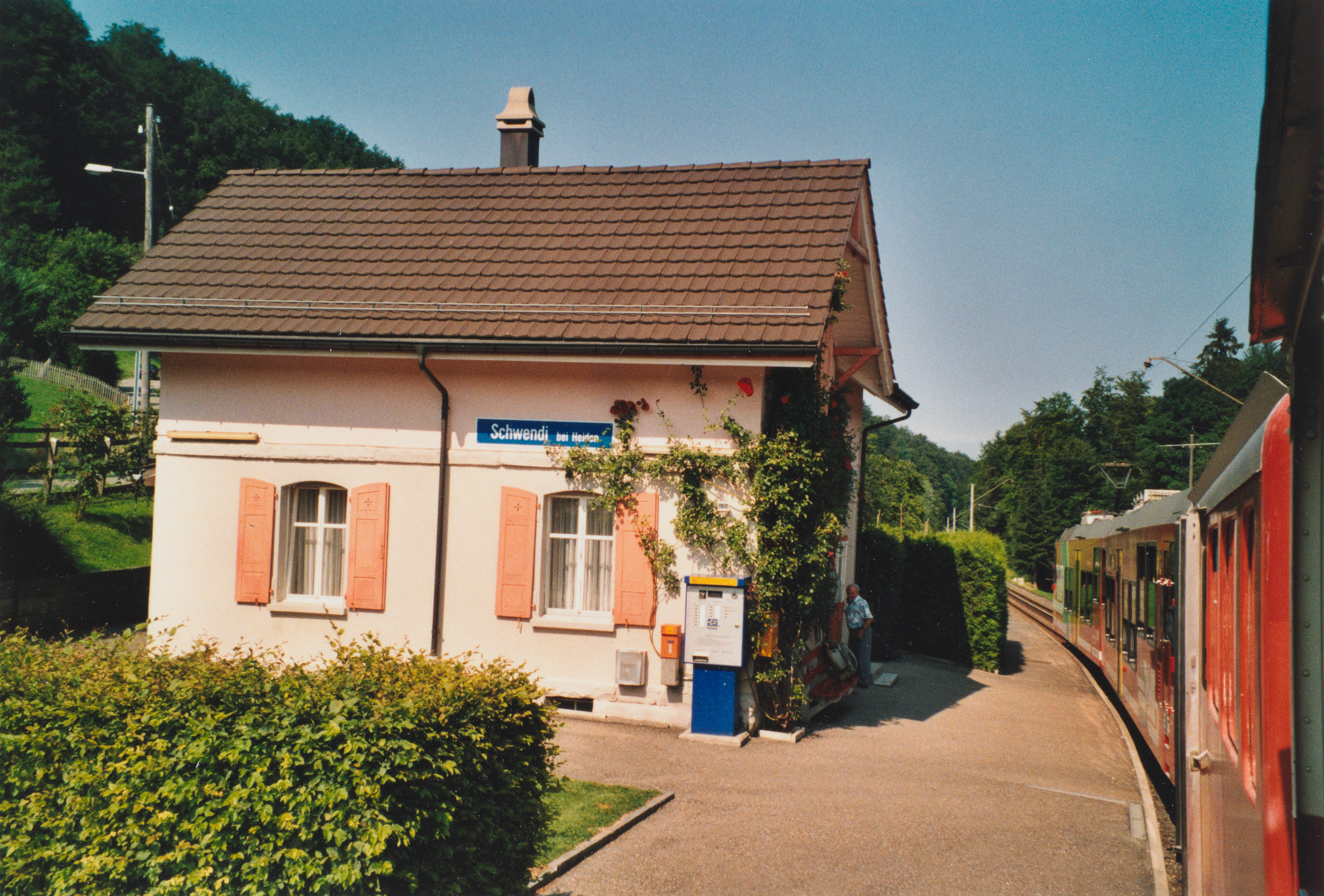
- The station building in 2001

General information
- Location: Switzerland
- Coordinates: 47°27′32″N 9°31′52″E
- Elevation: 671 m (2,201 ft)
- Owner: Appenzell Railways
- Line: Rorschach–Heiden railway
- Train operators: Appenzell Railways

Other information
- Fare zone: 242 (Tarifverbund Ostwind)

Services
Preceding station	St. Gallen S-Bahn	Following station
Wienacht-Tobel towards Rorschach Hafen	S25	Heiden Terminus
Location
- Location within Switzerland Location within Canton of Appenzell Ausserrhoden

Schwendi bei Heiden railway station (German: Bahnhof Schwendi bei Heiden) is a railway station in Heiden, in the Swiss canton of Appenzell Ausserrhoden. It is a station on the Rorschach–Heiden mountain rack railway line of Appenzell Railways. Trains stop only on request.

== Services ==
As of the December 2023 timetable change, the following services stop at Schwendi bei Heiden:

- St. Gallen S-Bahn:
  - S25: hourly service to Rorschach Hafen via Rorschach, and to Heiden.
