= Wienacht-Tobel railway station =

Train station in Switzerland

Wienacht-Tobel
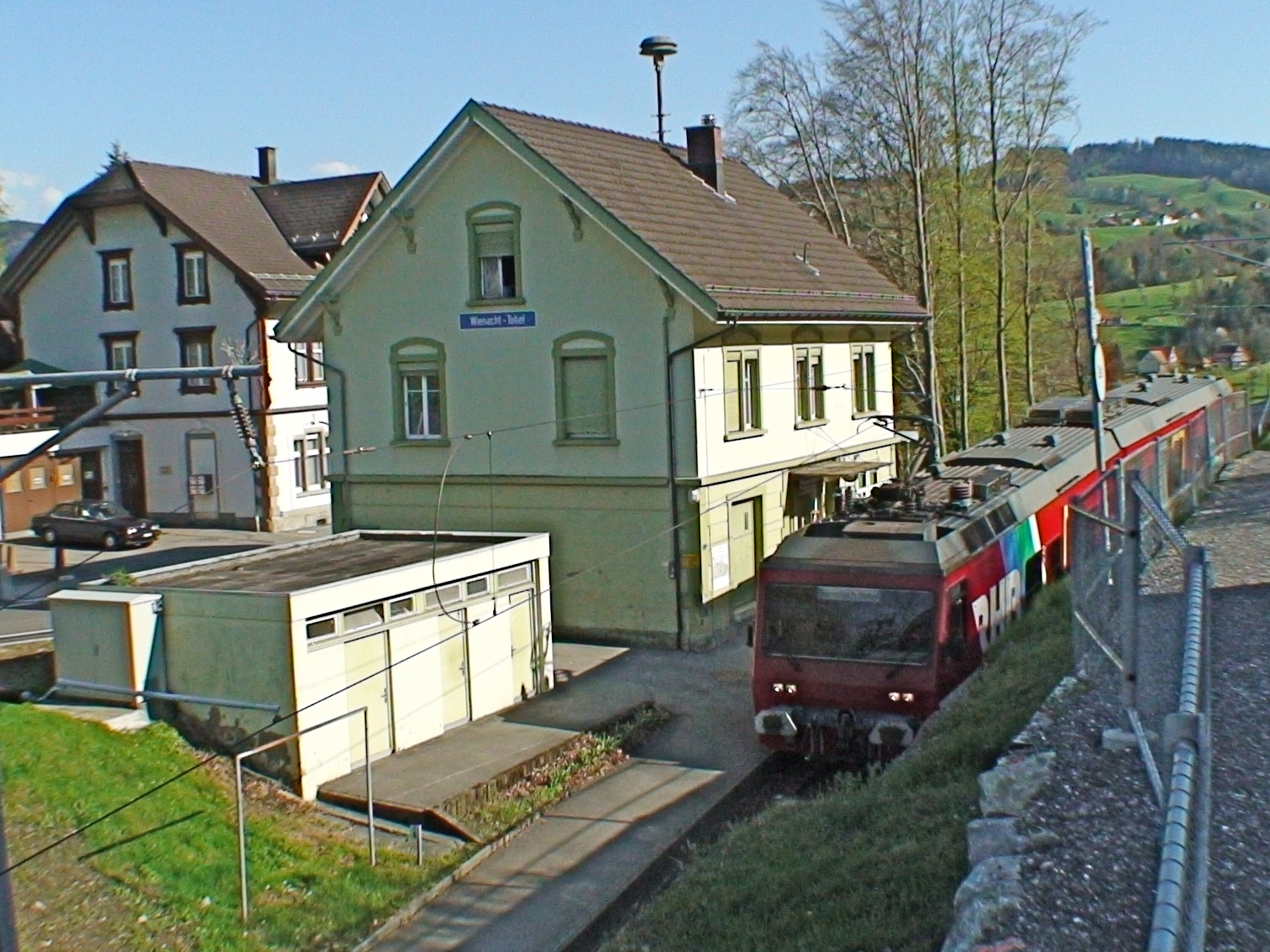
- The station building

General information
- Location: Switzerland
- Coordinates: 47°27′58″N 9°32′28″E
- Elevation: 616 m (2,021 ft)
- Owner: Appenzell Railways
- Line: Rorschach–Heiden railway
- Train operators: Appenzell Railways

Other information
- Fare zone: 242 (Tarifverbund Ostwind)

Services
Preceding station	St. Gallen S-Bahn	Following station
Wartensee towards Rorschach Hafen	S25	Schwendi bei Heiden towards Heiden
Location
- Location within Switzerland Location within Canton of Appenzell Ausserrhoden

Wienacht-Tobel railway station (German: Bahnhof Wienacht-Tobel) is a railway station in Lutzenberg, in the Swiss canton of Appenzell Ausserrhoden. It is a station on the Rorschach–Heiden mountain rack railway line of Appenzell Railways. Trains stop only on request.

== Services ==
As of the December 2023 timetable change, the following services stop at Wienacht-Tobel:

- St. Gallen S-Bahn:
  - S25: hourly service to Rorschach Hafen via Rorschach, and to Heiden.
