= Leumann =

Leumann is an Italian surname. Notable people with the surname include:

- Carlos Alberto Leumann, Argentine poet, teacher, and essayist
- Ernst Leumann, Swiss jainologist
- Georg Leumann, Swiss politician
- Katrin Leumann, Swiss cross-country mountain biker
- Manu Leumann, Swiss Indo-Europeanist
