= Johann Jakob Hohl =

Swiss politician

Johann Jakob Hohl (7 June 1834, Wolfhalden – 6 March 1913) was a Swiss politician and President of the Swiss Council of States (1896).

Preceded by Adolphe Jordan-Martin	President of the Council of States; 1896	Succeeded by Othmar Blumer
