= Heiden, Switzerland =

Heiden
- Municipality
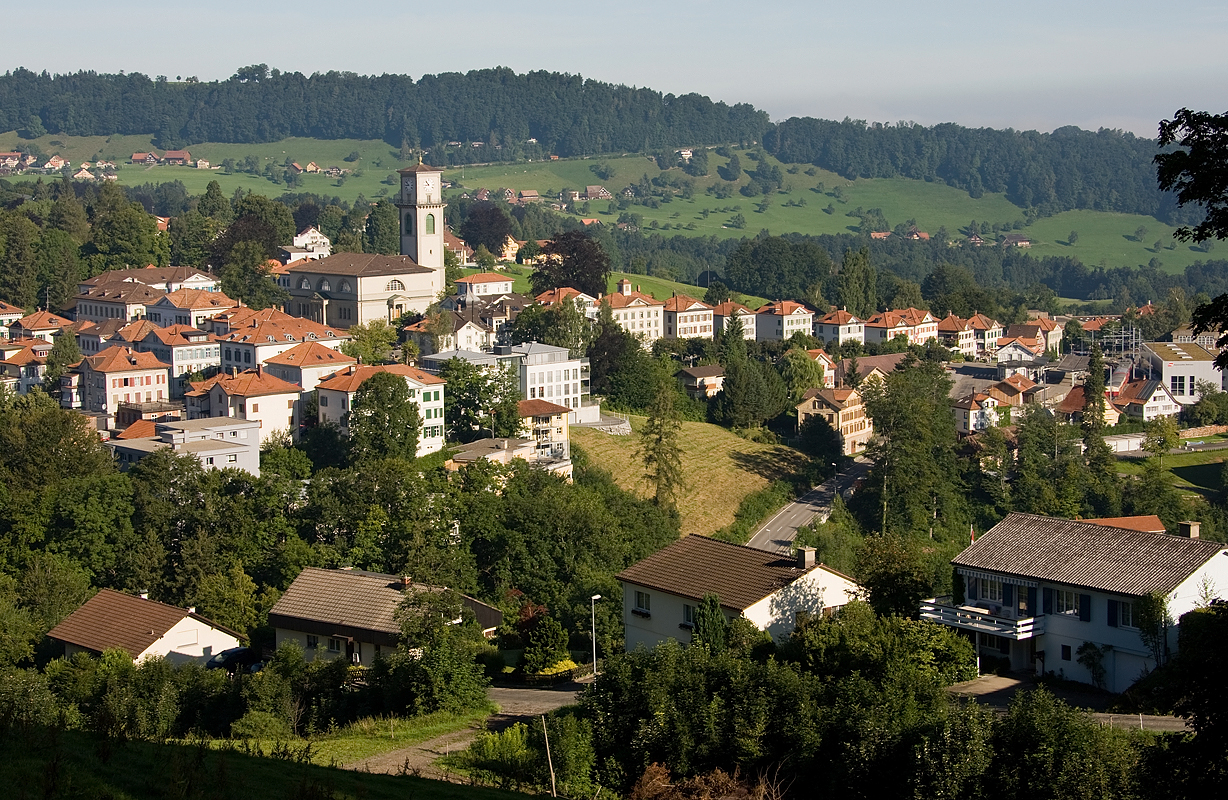

- Flag Coat of arms
- Location of Heiden
- Location within Switzerland Location within Canton of Appenzell Ausserrhoden
- Coordinates: 47°26′N 9°32′E
- Country: Switzerland
- Canton: Appenzell Ausserrhoden
- District: n.a.

Government
  - Executive: Gemeinderat with 7 members
  - Mayor: Gemeindepräsident(in); Gallus Pfister FDP/PRD
  - Parliament: none (Kommissionen)

Area
  - Total: 7.48 km^{2} (2.89 sq mi)
- Elevation (Protestant Church): 793 m (2,602 ft)

Population (December 2020)
  - Total: 4,188
  - Density: 560/km^{2} (1,450/sq mi)
- Time zone: UTC+01:00 (CET)
  - Summer (DST): UTC+02:00 (CEST)
- Postal code: 9410
- SFOS number: 3032
- ISO 3166 code: CH-AR
- Surrounded by: Eggersriet (SG), Grub, Lutzenberg, Oberegg (AI), Rehetobel, Reute, Thal (SG), Wald, Wolfhalden
- Twin towns: Bezau (Austria)
- Website: https://www.heiden.ch SFSO statistics

Heiden is a village and a municipality in the canton of Appenzell Ausserrhoden in Switzerland. Its Biedermeier village around the church square is listed as a heritage site of national significance.

== History ==
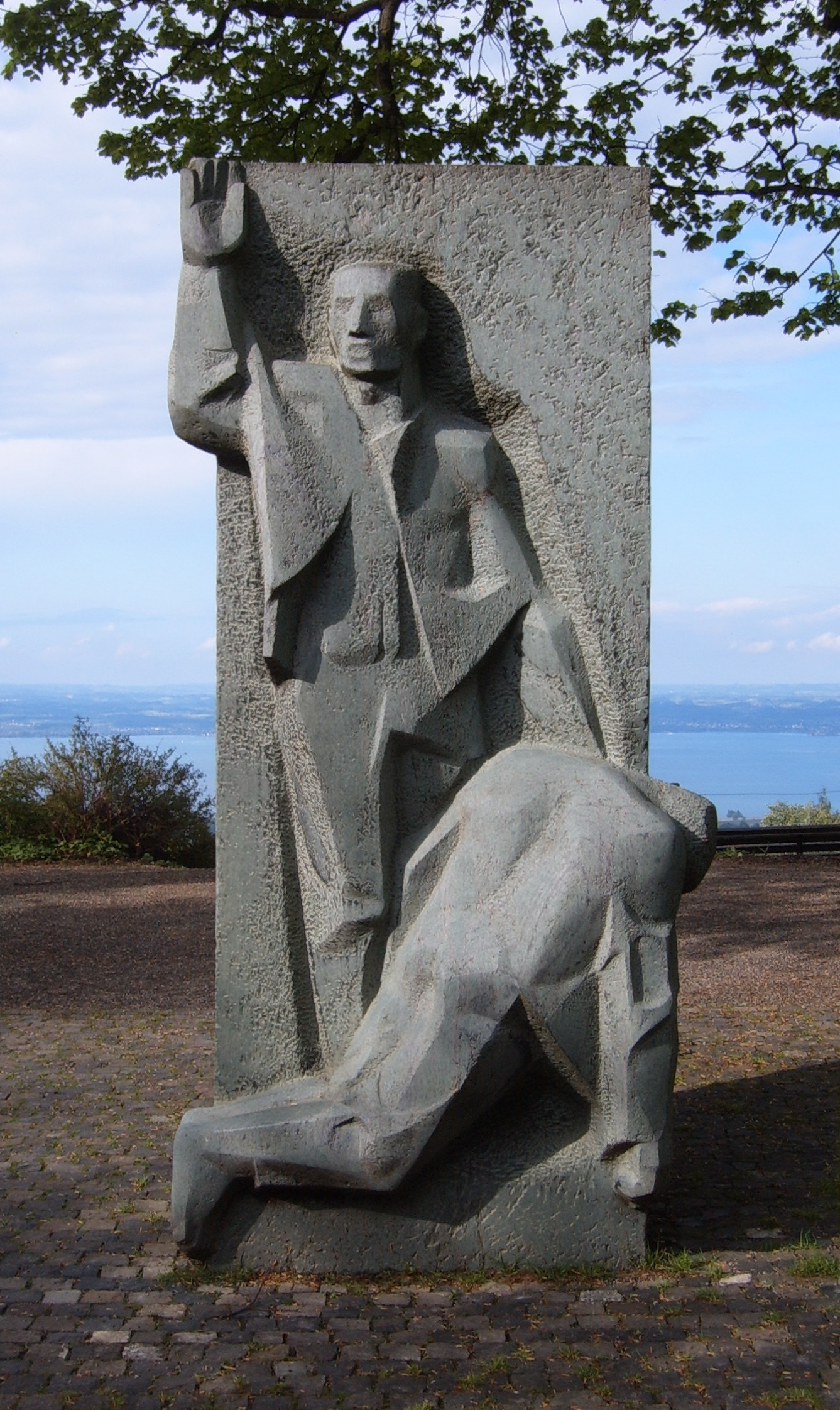
Henry Dunant memorial

Heiden is first mentioned in 1461 as guot genant Haiden.

Heiden, Lutzenberg, and Wolfhalden originally were parts of a single municipality named the Kurzenberg. Around 1650, Heiden and Wolfhalden could not agree about control over the local church. This led to the creation of a separate church in each village in 1652, making them independent. In 1658 the Kurzenberg was split into the three separate municipalities in defiance of the canton government. Their borders were officially established in 1666–67.

The founder of the Red Cross, Henry Dunant, spent his last years in Heiden. The former president of the ICRC, Jakob Kellenberger, was also born in Heiden.

== Geography ==
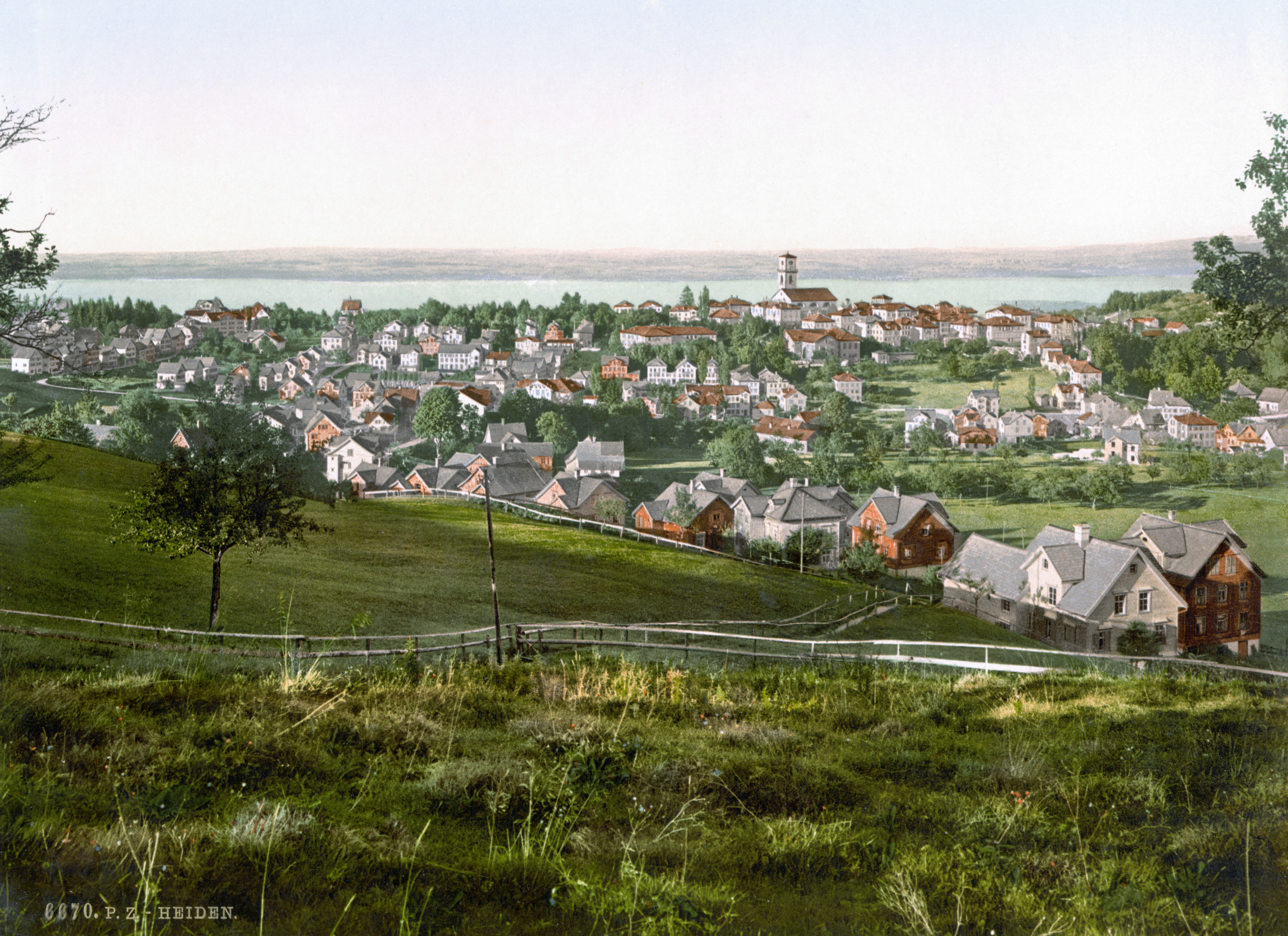
Heiden village, 1900.

Aerial view from 300 m by Walter Mittelholzer (1922)

Heiden has an area, as of 2006, of 7.5 km^{2} (2.9 sq mi). Of this area, 52.4% is used for agricultural purposes, while 30.6% is forested. Of the rest of the land, 16.8% is settled (buildings or roads), and the remainder (0.3%) is non-productive (rivers, glaciersm or mountains).

The municipality is located in the former District of Vorderland on the Kurzenberg. It consists of the village of Heiden and several hamlets near the village.

== Demographics ==
The historical population is given in the following table:

Historical population
Year	Pop.	±%
1667	1,248	—
1813	1,776	+42.3%
1818	1,630	−8.2%
1850	2,466	+51.3%
1900	3,745	+51.9%
1941	2,904	−22.5%
1950	3,094	+6.5%
1980	3,620	+17.0%
1990	3,885	+7.3%
2000	4,074	+4.9%
2005	3,993	−2.0%
2007	4,050	+1.4%

Heiden had a population (as of 2013) of 4,052, of which about 18.3% were foreign nationals. Over the previous 10 years, the population had decreased at a rate of -4.2%.

Most of the population (as of 2000) spoke German (88.7%), with Croatian being second most common (5.9%), and Italian being third most common (1.1%).

As of 2000, the gender distribution of the population was 48.5% male, and 51.5% female.

The age distribution, as of 2000, in Heiden was; 311 people or 7.7% of the population were between 0–6 years old. 512 people or 12.6% were 6–15, and 219 people or 5.4% were 16–19. Of the adult population, 168 people or 4.1% of the population were between 20 and 24 years old. 1,179 people or 29.0% were 25–44, and 966 people or 23.8% were 45–64. The senior population distribution was 491 people or 12.1% of the population were between 65 and 79 years old, and 217 people or 5.3% were over 80.

In the 2007 federal election the FDP received 65% of the vote.

In Heiden about 68.3% of the population (between age 25–64) have completed either non-mandatory upper secondary education or additional higher education (either university or a Fachhochschule).

Heiden has an unemployment rate of 1.61%. As of 2005, there were 93 people employed in the primary economic sector and about 37 businesses involved in this sector. 708 people were employed in the secondary sector and there were 41 businesses in this sector. 1,428 people were employed in the tertiary sector, with 189 businesses in this sector.

== Transportation ==
An hourly rack railway, the S25 service operated by Appenzell Railways for St. Gallen S-Bahn, leads from Heiden to the port of Rorschach (Rorschach Hafen) on Lake Constance, 400 meters (1,300 ft) below. It uses the Rorschach-Heiden railway line. Two stations exist in the municipality, Heiden and Schwendi bei Heiden.

Heiden is also connected by several frequent Swiss PostAuto lines.

== Notable residents ==
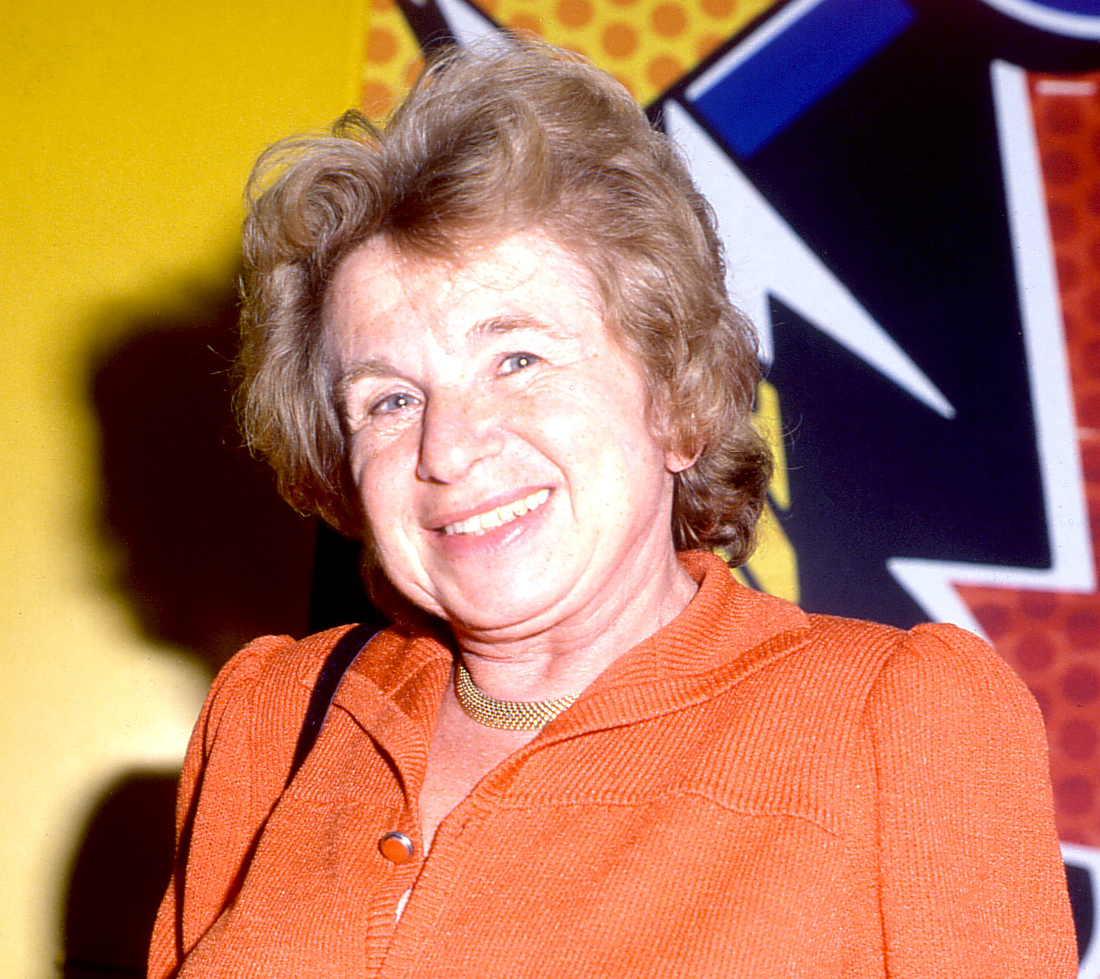
Ruth Westheimer

- Henry Dunant (1828–1910), co-founder of the Red Cross, received the first Nobel Peace Prize.
- Heinrich Frenkel (1860–1931), neurologist
- Sonja Nef (born 1972), Olympic skier
- Carlo Schmid-Sutter (born 1950), politician
- Hugo Thiemann (1917–2012), research and development manager
- Ruth Westheimer (born Karola Siegel, 1928–2024; known as "Dr. Ruth"), German-American sex therapist, talk show host, author, professor, Holocaust survivor, and former Haganah sniper.
