= Josef Hildebrand =

Josef Hildebrand may refer to:

- Josef Hildebrand (politician) (1855–1935), Swiss politician and president of the Swiss Council of States
- Josef Hildebrand (fencer) (1895–?), Czech fencer
