= Arnold Robert =

Swiss politician

J. Arnold Robert-Tissot (French: [aʁnɔld ʁɔbɛʁ tiso]; 26 May 1846 – 20 October 1925) was a Swiss politician and President of the Swiss Council of States (1899/1900).

Preceded by Rinaldo Simen	President of the Council of States; 1899/1900	Succeeded by Georg Leumann
