= Henri de Torrenté =

Swiss politician (1845–1922)

Henri de Torrenté (6 December 1845 – 20 January 1922) was a Swiss politician and President of the Swiss Council of States (1894/1895).

He was the father of the diplomat Henry de Torrenté.

Preceded by Oskar Munzinger	President of the Council of States; 1894/1895	Succeeded by Adolphe Jordan-Martin
