= List of mayors of Olten =

Mayors in Solothurn, Switzerland

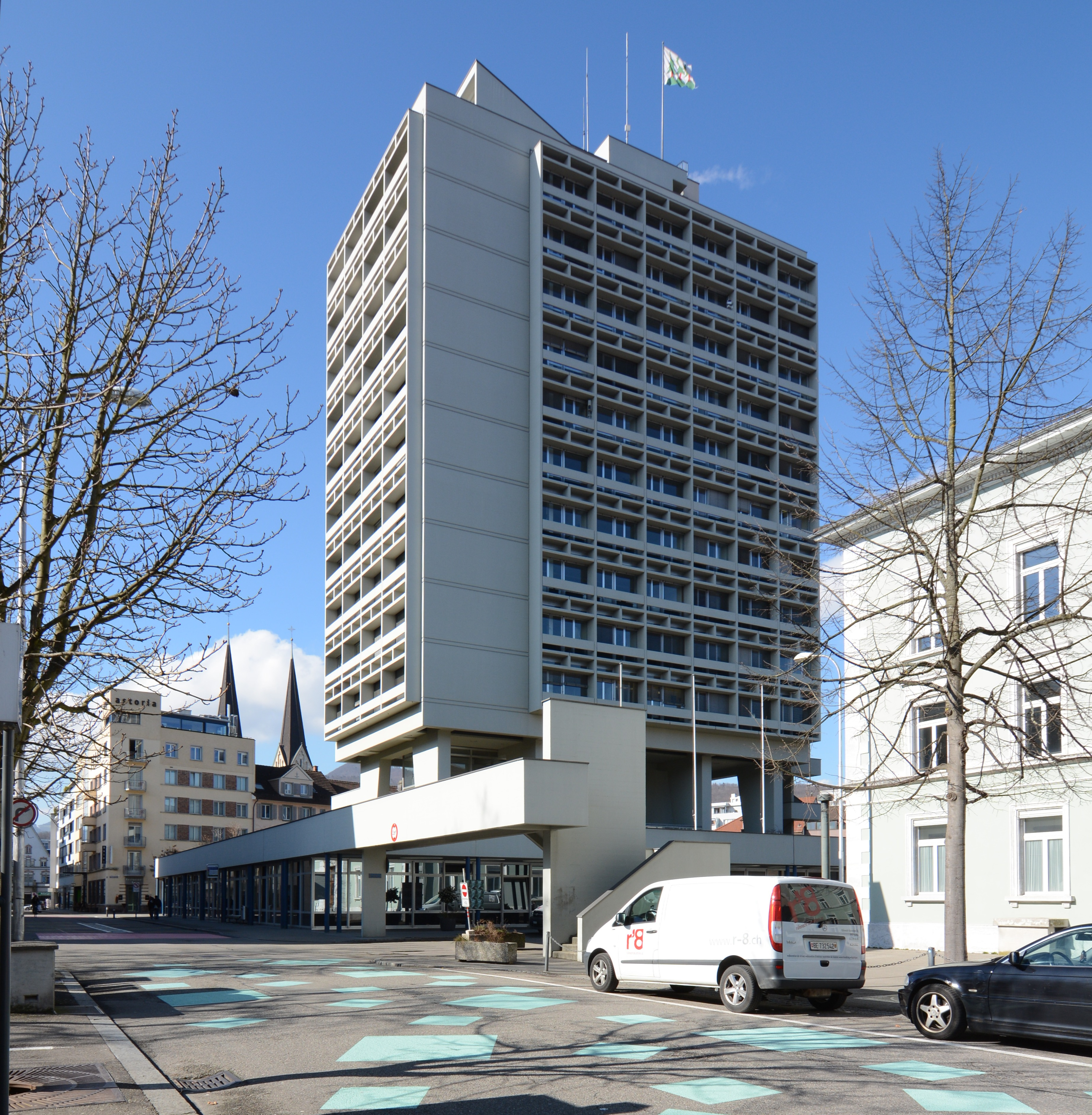
Stadthaus Olten

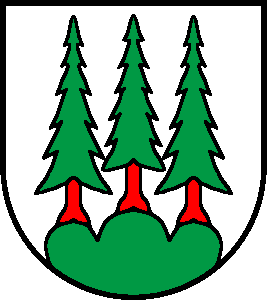
Coat of arms of Olten

This is a list of mayors of Olten, Canton of Solothurn, Switzerland. The mayor of Olten (Stadtpräsident von Olten) chairs the city council (Stadtrat). The mayor is named Stadtpräsident since 1993, Stadtammann before. From 1817 to 1830, two officials alternated annually the functions of Stadtammann and Stadthalter (stadtholder).

Mayors of Olten
Term	Mayor	Lifespan	Party	Notes
1817	Franz Xaver Meier		liberal/freisinnig	1817–1829 (odd years)
1818	Johann Baptist Frey	(1750–1831)	liberal/freisinnig	1818–1830 (even years)
1819	Franz Xaver Meier		liberal/freisinnig	1817–1829 (odd years)
1820	Johann Baptist Frey	(1750–1831)	liberal/freisinnig	1818–1830 (even years)
1821	Franz Xaver Meier		liberal/freisinnig	1817–1829 (odd years)
1822	Johann Baptist Frey	(1750–1831)	liberal/freisinnig	1818–1830 (even years)
1823	Franz Xaver Meier		liberal/freisinnig	1817–1829 (odd years)
1824	Johann Baptist Frey	(1750–1831)	liberal/freisinnig	1818–1830 (even years)
1825	Franz Xaver Meier		liberal/freisinnig	1817–1829 (odd years)
1826	Johann Baptist Frey	(1750–1831)	liberal/freisinnig	1818–1830 (even years)
1827	Franz Xaver Meier		liberal/freisinnig	1817–1829 (odd years)
1828	Johann Baptist Frey	(1750–1831)	liberal/freisinnig	1818–1830 (even years)
1829	Franz Xaver Meier		liberal/freisinnig	1817–1829 (odd years)
1829	Johann Meier		liberal/freisinnig	
1830	Johann Baptist Frey	(1750–1831)	liberal/freisinnig	1818–1830 (even years)
1831–1861	Ulrich Munzinger		liberal/freisinnig	
1861–1874	Jakob Benedikt Schmid		liberal/freisinnig	
1874–1878	Johann Gisi		liberal/freisinnig	
1878–1881	Josef Meier		liberal/freisinnig	
1881–1890	Alois Christen		liberal/freisinnig	
1890–1902	Casimir von Arx	(1852–1931)	FDP/PLR	
1902–1933	Hugo Dietschi	(1864–1955)	FDP/PLR	
1933–1957	Hugo Meyer		FDP/PLR	
1957–1983	Hans Derendinger	(1920–1996)	FDP/PLR	
1983–1997	Philipp Schumacher		FDP/PLR	
1997–2013	Ernst Zingg	(born 1951)	FDP/PLR	
2013–2021	Martin Wey	(born 1962)	CVP/PDC	
2021–present	Thomas Marbet	(born 1967)	SPS/PSS	
