= Karl Reichlin =

Swiss politician

Karl Reichlin (24 February 1841 – 22 October 1924) was a Swiss politician and President of the Swiss Council of States (1901/1902).

Preceded by Georg Leumann	President of the Council of States; 1901/1902	Succeeded by Casimir von Arx
