= Rinaldo Simen =

Swiss politician

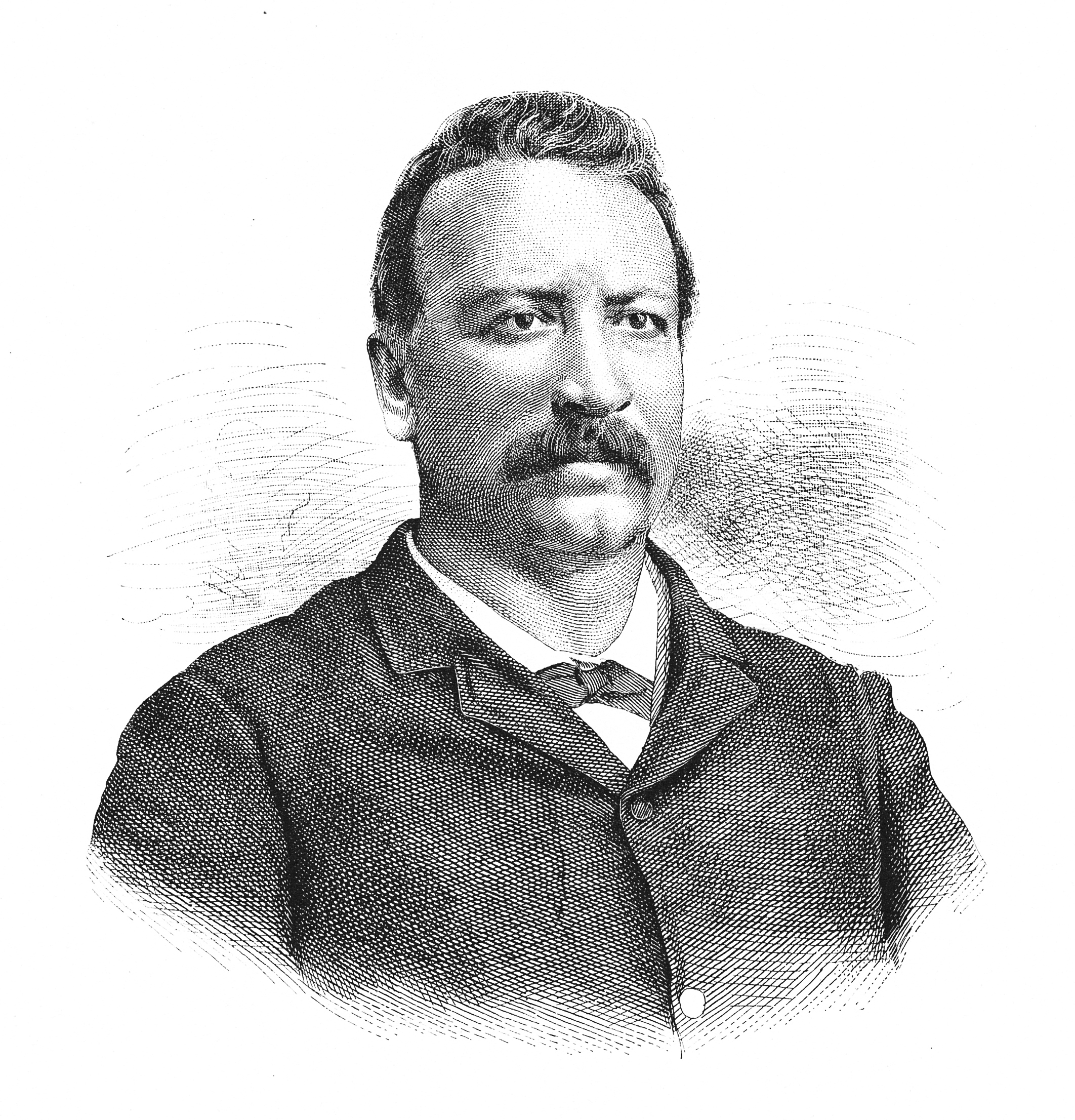
A picture of Rinaldo Simen

Rinaldo Simen (8 March 1849 – 20 September 1910) was a Swiss politician and President of the Swiss Council of States (1899).

Piazza Rinaldo Simen in Bellinzona and Via Rinaldo Simen in Minusio, Locarno and Lugano are named for him.

Preceded by Josef Hildebrand	President of the Council of States; 1899	Succeeded by Arnold Robert
