= Casimir von Arx =

Swiss politician

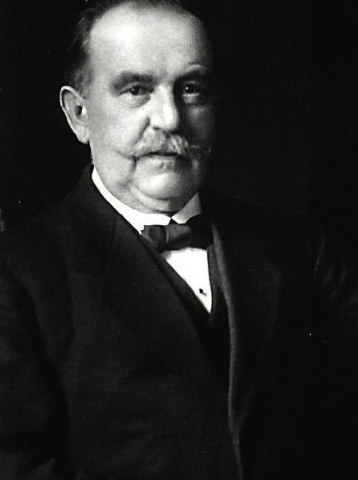
Casimir von Arx

Casimir von Arx (30 October 1852 – 7 March 1931) was a Swiss politician, mayor of Olten (1890–1902) and President of the Swiss Council of States (1902).

Preceded by Karl Reichlin	President of the Council of States; 1902	Succeeded by Arthur Hoffmann
