= Oskar Munzinger =

Swiss politician

Oskar Munzinger (18 March 1849 – 18 May 1932) was a Swiss politician and President of the Swiss Council of States (1893/1894).

Preceded by Friedrich Eggli	President of the Council of States; 1893/1894	Succeeded by Henri de Torrenté
