= Othmar Blumer =

Swiss politician

Othmar Blumer (10 August 1848 – 25 April 1900) was a Swiss politician and President of the Swiss Council of States (1896/1897).

| Preceded by Johann Jakob Hohl | President of the Council of States; 1896/1897 | Succeeded by Luzius Raschein |
