= Luzius Raschein =

Swiss politician and President of the Swiss Council of States

Luzius Raschein (25 January 1831, Malix – 9 November 1899) was a Swiss politician and President of the Swiss Council of States (1897/1898).

Preceded by Othmar Blumer	President of the Council of States; 1897/1898	Succeeded by Josef Hildebrand
