= Adolphe Jordan =

Swiss politician

Adolphe Jordan-Martin (11 July 1845 – 27 May 1900) was a Swiss politician and President of the Swiss Council of States (1895/1896).

Preceded by Henri de Torrenté	President of the Council of States; 1895/1896	Succeeded by Johann Jakob Hohl
