= Georg Leumann =

Swiss politician

Johann Georg Leumann (30 August 1842 – 11 November 1918) was a Swiss politician and President of the Swiss Council of States (1900/1901).

Preceded by Arnold Robert	President of the Council of States; 1900/1901	Succeeded by Karl Reichlin
