= Josef Hildebrand (politician) =

Swiss politician

Josef Hildebrand (28 June 1855, Cham – 16 March 1935) was a Swiss politician and President of the Swiss Council of States (1898/1899).

Preceded by Luzius Raschein	President of the Council of States; 1898/1899	Succeeded by Rinaldo Simen
