= Wolfhalden =

- Municipality
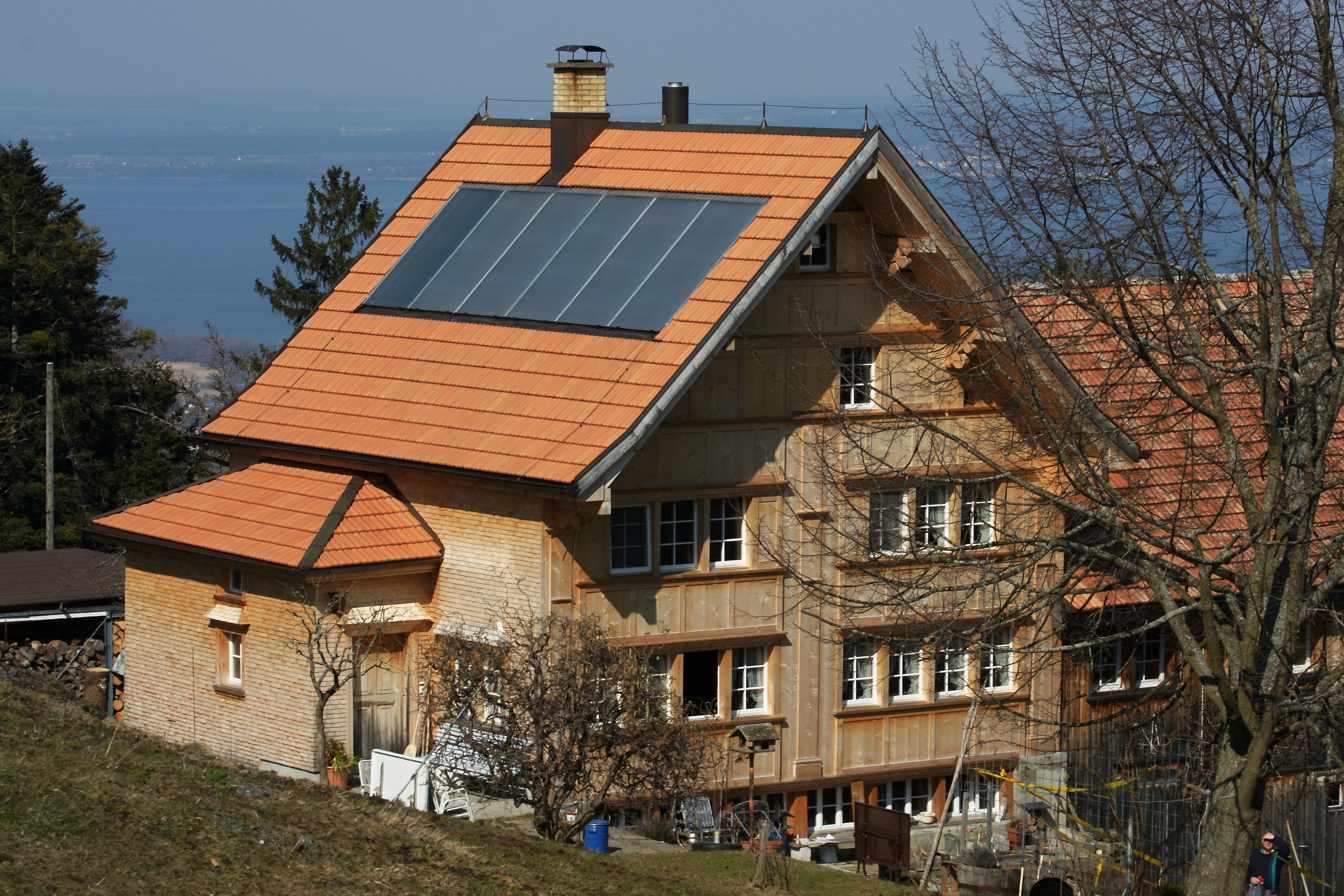

- Flag Coat of arms
- Location of Wolfhalden
- Location within Switzerland Location within Canton of Appenzell Ausserrhoden
- Coordinates: 47°27′N 9°33′E
- Country: Switzerland
- Canton: Appenzell Ausserrhoden
- District: n.a.

Area
  - Total: 6.94 km^{2} (2.68 sq mi)
- Elevation: 716 m (2,349 ft)

Population (December 2008)
  - Total: 1,719
  - Density: 248/km^{2} (642/sq mi)
- Time zone: UTC+01:00 (CET)
  - Summer (DST): UTC+02:00 (CEST)
- Postal code: 9427
- SFOS number: 3038
- ISO 3166 code: CH-AR
- Surrounded by: Heiden, Lutzenberg, Oberegg (AI), Thal (SG), Walzenhausen
- Website: www.wolfhalden.ch

Wolfhalden is a municipality in the canton of Appenzell Ausserrhoden in Switzerland.

== History ==
Wolfhalden, Heiden and Lutzenberg originally were parts of a single municipality named the Kurzenberg. Around 1650 Wolfhalden and Heiden could not agree about control over the local church. This led to the creation of a church in each village in 1652, making them independent. In 1658 the Kurzenberg was split into the three separate municipalities in defiance of the canton government; their borders were officially established in 1666–7.

== Geography ==
Aerial view of Wolfhalden from 900 m by Walter Mittelholzer (1927)

As of 2006, Wolfhalden has an area of 7 km^{2} (2.7 sq mi). Of this area, 58% is used for agricultural purposes, while 30.5% is forested. Of the rest of the land, 11.4% is settled (buildings or roads) and the remainder (0.1%) is non-productive (rivers, glaciers or mountains).

== Demographics ==
Wolfhalden has a population (as of 2008) of 1,719, of which about 11.3% are foreign nationals. Over the last 10 years, the population has decreased at a rate of 4.3%. Most of the population (as of 2000) speaks German (94.4%), with Serbo-Croatian being second most common (1.0%) and Italian being third ( 0.9%).

As of 2000, the gender distribution of the population was 51.2% male and 48.8% female. The age distribution was: 138 people or 8.2% of the population are between 0–6 years old. 197 people or 11.7% are 6–15, and 90 people or 5.3% are 16–19. Of the adult population, 70 people or 4.1% of the population are between 20 and 24 years old. 483 people or 28.6% are 25–44, and 428 people or 25.3% are 45–64. The senior population distribution is 211 people or 12.5% of the population are between 65 and 79 years old, and 72 people or 4.3% are over 80.

In the 2007 federal election the FDP received 65.1% of the vote.

About 74.6% of the population (age 25–64) have completed either non-mandatory upper secondary education or additional higher education (either university or a Fachhochschule).

Wolfhalden has an unemployment rate of 1.8%. As of 2005, there were 65 people employed in the primary economic sector and about 29 businesses involved in this sector. 372 people are employed in the secondary sector and there are 26 businesses in this sector. 175 people are employed in the tertiary sector, with 54 businesses in this sector.

Historical population
Year	Pop.	±%
1980	1,632	—
1990	1,713	+5.0%
2000	1,717	+0.2%
2005	1,713	−0.2%
2007	1,708	−0.3%

The historical population is given in the following table:

== Notable people ==
- Johann Georg Gustav Tobler (1769–1843), pedagogue, educational reformist, school founder, and prolific writer.
- Gustav Adolf Tobler, educator, writer, and artist. Director of Canton School in Trogen for 15 years from 1842 to 1857.
- Gregor Gustav Adolf Tobler (1834–1875), merchant, coffee planter, and writer in the Spanish Philippines

== Heritage sites of national significance ==
The Alte Mühle Wolfhalden (The Old Mill at Wolfhalden) is listed as a heritage site of national significance.
