= Lutzenberg, Switzerland =

Lutzenberg
- Municipality
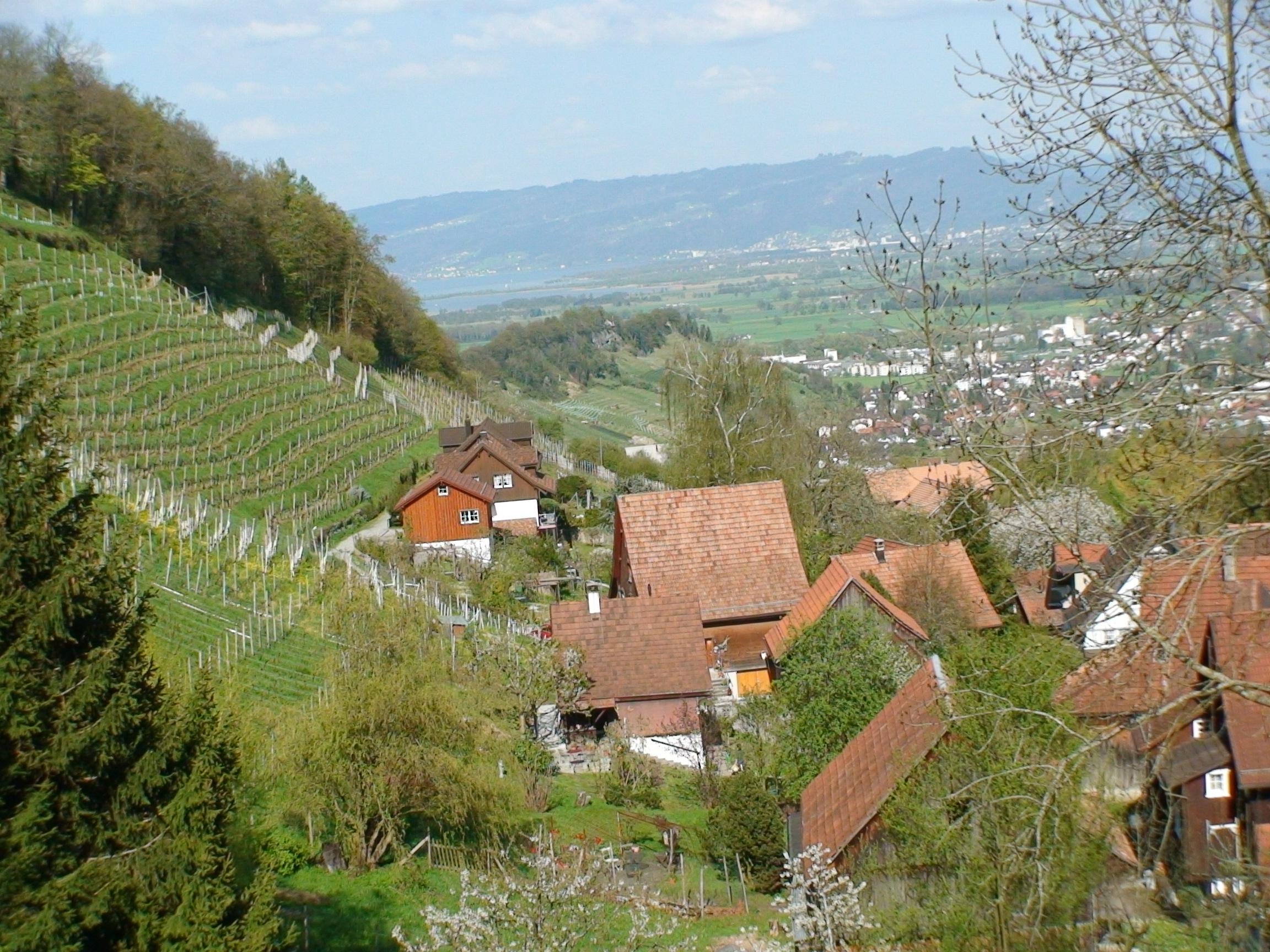

- Flag Coat of arms
- Location of Lutzenberg
- Location within Switzerland Location within Canton of Appenzell Ausserrhoden
- Coordinates: 47°27′N 9°35′E
- Country: Switzerland
- Canton: Appenzell Ausserrhoden
- District: n.a.

Area
  - Total: 2.26 km^{2} (0.87 sq mi)
- Elevation: 538 m (1,765 ft)

Population (December 2008)
  - Total: 1,229
  - Density: 544/km^{2} (1,410/sq mi)
- Time zone: UTC+01:00 (CET)
  - Summer (DST): UTC+02:00 (CEST)
- Postal code: 9426
- SFOS number: 3033
- ISO 3166 code: CH-AR
- Surrounded by: Eggersriet (SG), Heiden, Rheineck (SG), Rorschacherberg (SG), Sankt Margrethen (SG), Thal (SG), Walzenhausen, Wolfhalden
- Website: www.lutzenberg.ch

Lutzenberg is a municipality in the canton of Appenzell Ausserrhoden in Switzerland. Its hamlet of Tobel is listed as a heritage site of national significance.

== History ==
Aerial view from 200 m by Walter Mittelholzer (1920)

Lutzenberg is first mentioned in 1634 as Lutzenberg. Lutzenberg, Heiden and Wolfhalden originally were parts of a single municipality named the Kurzenberg. In 1658 the Kurzenberg was split into the three separate municipalities in defiance of the canton government; their borders were officially established in 1666–7.

== Geography ==
Lutzenberg has an area, as of 2006, of 2.3 km^{2} (0.89 sq mi). Of this area, 55.5% is used for agricultural purposes, while 25.1% is forested. The rest of the land, (19.4%) is settled.

The municipality is located in the former District of Vorderland. It is the smallest municipality in the Canton, is the only municipality without a church and it consists of two physically separated sections. It consists of the two separated hamlets of Haufen-Brenden and Wienacht-Tobel, which has a railway station, as well as scattered farm houses.

== Demographics ==
Lutzenberg has a population (as of 2008) of 1,229, of which about 13.2% are foreign nationals. Over the last 10 years the population has grown at a rate of 1.3%. Most of the population (as of 2000) speaks German (91.7%), with English being second most common ( 1.9%) and Albanian being third ( 1.4%).

As of 2000, the gender distribution of the population was 52.7% male and 47.3% female. The age distribution, as of 2000, in Lutzenberg is; 97 people or 7.3% of the population are between 0–6 years old. 178 people or 13.5% are 6–15, and 78 people or 5.9% are 16–19. Of the adult population, 87 people or 6.6% of the population are between 20 and 24 years old. 433 people or 32.7% are 25–44, and 272 people or 20.6% are 45–64. The senior population distribution is 128 people or 9.7% of the population are between 65 and 79 years old, and 50 people or 3.8% are over 80.

In the 2007 federal election the FDP received 77.8% of the vote.

The entire Swiss population is generally well educated. In Lutzenberg about 71.5% of the population (between age 25–64) have completed either non-mandatory upper secondary education or additional higher education (either university or a Fachhochschule).

Lutzenberg has an unemployment rate of 1.82%. As of 2005, there were 37 people employed in the primary economic sector and about 14 businesses involved in this sector. 78 people are employed in the secondary sector and there are 16 businesses in this sector. 191 people are employed in the tertiary sector, with 49 businesses in this sector.

The historical population is given in the following table:

Historical population
Year	Pop.	±%
1667	518	—
1734	847	+63.5%
1813	700	−17.4%
1850	908	+29.7%
1900	1,353	+49.0%
1941	1,084	−19.9%
1950	1,233	+13.7%
1980	880	−28.6%
2000	1,323	+50.3%
2005	1,222	−7.6%
2007	1,220	−0.2%
