= Rorschach railway station =

Railway station in Rorschach, Switzerland

Rorschach
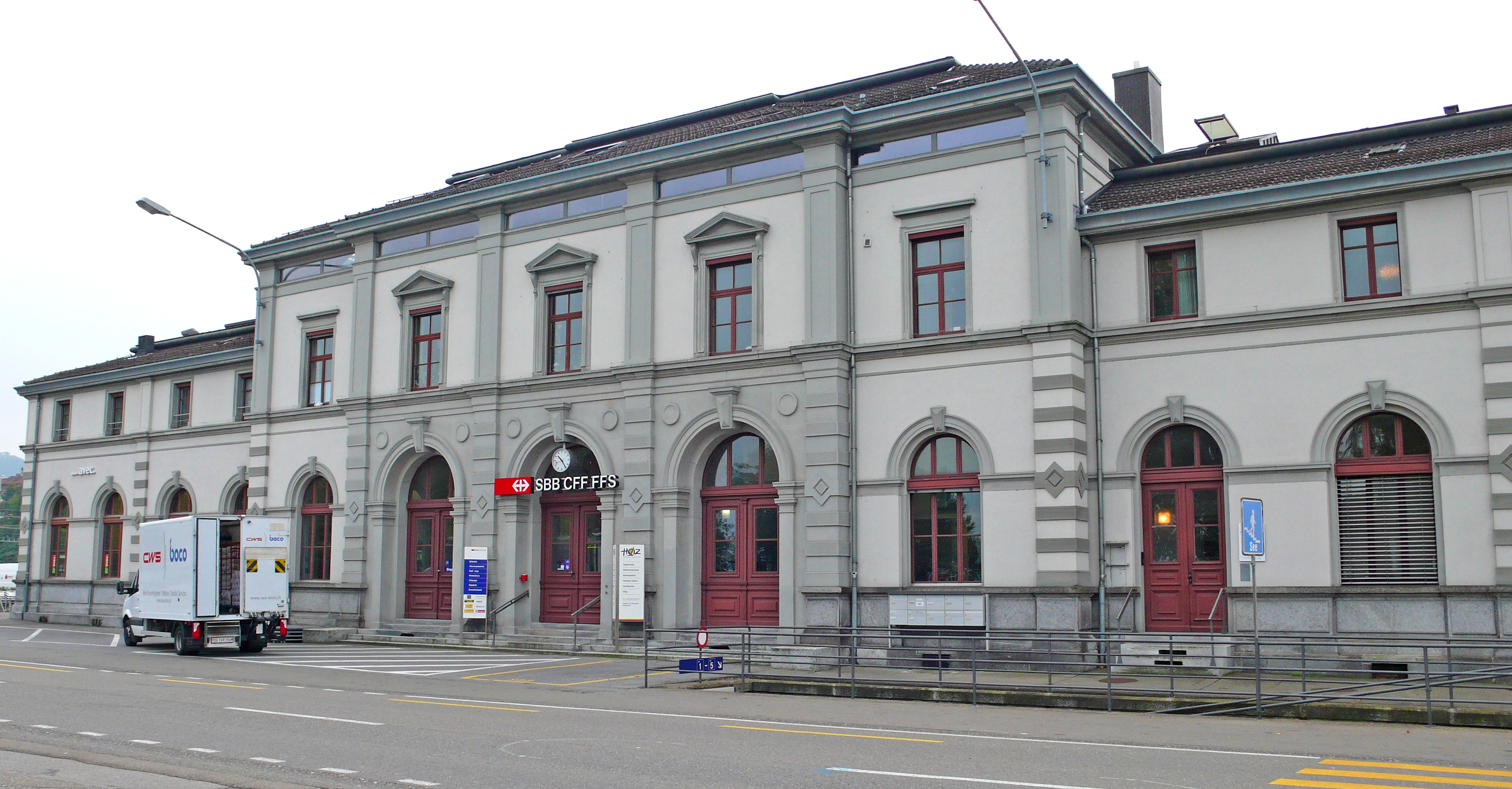
- The station building in 2010

General information
- Location: Rorschach; Switzerland
- Coordinates: 47°28′41″N 9°30′18″E
- Elevation: 399 m (1,309 ft)
- Owner: Swiss Federal Railways
- Lines: Chur–Rorschach line; Rorschach–St. Gallen line; Lake Line; Rorschach–Heiden line
- Distance: 65.0 km (40.4 mi) from Sargans; 97.3 km (60.5 mi) from Zürich Hauptbahnhof
- Train operators: Swiss Federal Railways; Thurbo; Südostbahn; Appenzell Railways

Other information
- Fare zone: 231 (Tarifverbund Ostwind)

Services
Preceding station	SBB CFF FFS	Following station
St. Gallen towards Lausanne	IC 5	Terminus
St. Gallen towards Zürich HB	IR 13	St. Margrethen towards Sargans
Preceding station	Südostbahn	Following station
St. Gallen Terminus	IR 13 Alpenrhein-Express	St. Margrethen towards Chur
Preceding station	St. Gallen S-Bahn	Following station
Rorschach Stadt towards Nesslau-Neu St. Johann	S2	Staad towards Altstätten SG
Rorschach Stadt towards Rapperswil	S4	Staad towards Sargans
Rorschach Stadt towards Weinfelden	S5	Staad towards St. Margrethen
Rorschach Hafen towards Weinfelden	S7	St. Margrethen towards Lindau-Insel
Rorschach Hafen Terminus	S25	Seebleiche towards Heiden
Rorschach Stadt towards Winterthur	SN22 Limited service	Staad towards Heerbrugg
Location
- Location within Switzerland Location within Canton of St. Gallen

Rorschach railway station (German: Bahnhof Rorschach) is a railway station in Rorschach, in the Swiss canton of St. Gallen. It sits at the junction of four railway lines: Chur–Rorschach, Rorschach–St. Gallen, Rorschach–Heiden, and the Lake Line. It is the primary station for Rorschach and is served by local and long-distance trains.

Rorschach is one of three stations within the municipality of Rorschach, along with Rorschach Stadt (the next station west on the Rorschach–St. Gallen line) and Rorschach Hafen, the next station northwest on the Rorschach–Heiden line on the shore of Lake Constance.

== Services ==
As of the December 2023 timetable change, the following services stop at Rorschach:

- InterCity / InterRegio:
  - / half-hourly service to Zürich HB and hourly service to Geneva Airport and Chur.
- St. Gallen S-Bahn:
  - S2 / S4: half-hourly service between Wattwil and Altstätten SG via St. Gallen and hourly service to Rapperswil, Sargans, and Nesslau-Neu St. Johann.
  - S5: hourly service between Weinfelden and St. Margrethen via St. Gallen.
  - S7: half-hourly service to Romanshorn and hourly service to Weinfelden; on Saturdays and Sundays, service every two hours to Lindau-Reutin via Bregenz. Limited service on weekdays to Lindau.
  - S25: hourly service between Rorschach Hafen and Heiden via Wienacht-Tobel.

During weekends, the station is served by a nighttime S-Bahn service (SN22), offered by Ostwind fare network, and operated by Thurbo for St. Gallen S-Bahn.

- St. Gallen S-Bahn SN22: hourly service to Winterthur and to Heerbrugg, via St. Gallen.

== See also ==
- Bodensee S-Bahn
- Rail transport in Switzerland
