= Appenzell Railways =

Swiss railway company

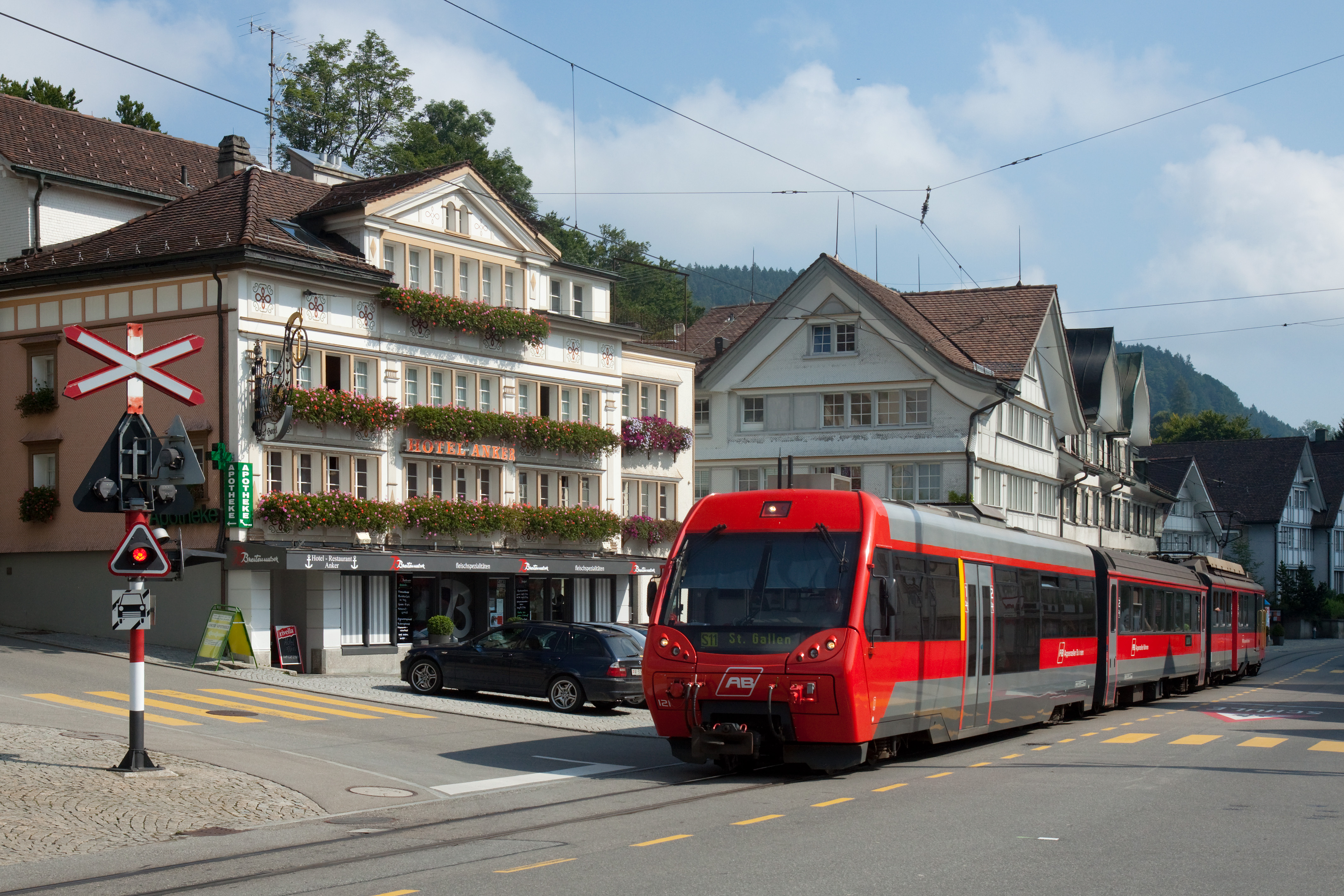
- Native name: Appenzeller Bahnen (German)
- Type: AG/SA
- ISIN: CH0026212446
- Industry: Public transport
- Founded: 1 July 2006; 20 years ago
- Headquarters: Herisau, Switzerland
- Key people: Ernst Boos (CEO), Thomas Baumgartner (director)
- Revenue: ▲CHF41.9 million (2012)
- Number of employees: 216 (as of 2020)
- Divisions: Passenger
- Website: Official website (in German)

Appenzell Railways (AB) network
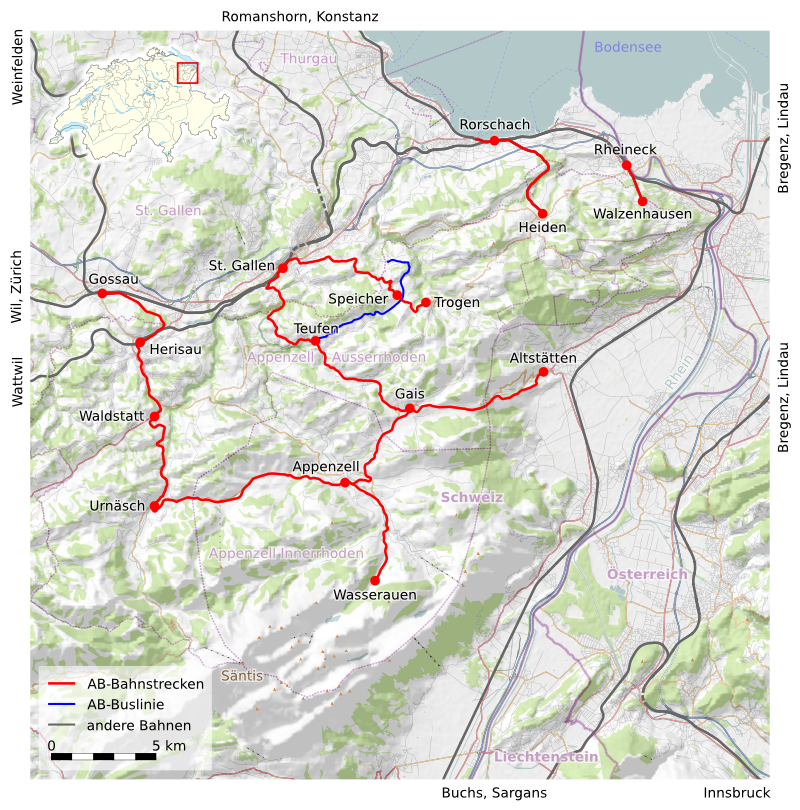
- Map showing AB railway lines (red) and bus route (blue) prior to the 2021 acquisition of the Frauenfeld–Wil railway

Overview
- Dates of operation: 1875–present

Technical
- Track gauge: 1,435 mm (4 ft 8 1/2 in) standard gauge, 1,200 mm (3 ft 11 1/4 in), 1,000 mm (3 ft 3 3/8 in) metre gauge
- Electrification: 1500 V / DC, 600 V / DC, 15 kV 16.7 Hz Overhead line
- Length: 93,592 km (58,155.4 mi)

Appenzell Railways (German: Appenzeller Bahnen, AB) is a Swiss railway company with headquarters in Herisau. It operates a network of railways and a bus line in the cantons of Appenzell Innerrhoden, Appenzell Ausserrhoden, St. Gallen and Thurgau.

It was founded in 2006 through the merger of the former Appenzeller Bahnen (founded in 1988) with the Rorschach–Heiden railway, Rheineck–Walzenhausen mountain railway and Trogenerbahn. In 2021, AB acquired the Frauenfeld-Wil railway.

== History ==
The origins of the Appenzeller Bahnen company lies in a number of formerly independent companies and railway lines:

- The Rorschach–Heiden-Bergbahn (RHB), which opened its line from Rorschach to Heiden in 1875.
- The Appenzellerbahn (AB), which opened its line from St. Gallen Winkeln to Urnäsch via Herisau in 1875, with an extension from Urnäsch to Appenzell in 1886. In 1913, the line from Herisau to Winkeln was replaced by a new line to Gossau.
- The Frauenfeld–Wil railway (FW) in 1887
- The St. Gallen–Gais–Appenzell-Bahn (SGA), which opened between St. Gallen and Gais in 1889, and was extended to Appenzell in 1904.
- The Rheineck–Walzenhausen-Bergbahn (RhW), which opened between Rheineck and Walzenhausen in 1896.
- The Trogenerbahn (TB), which opened between St. Gallen and Trogen in 1903.
- The Altstätten-Gais-Bahn (AG), which opened between Gais and Altstätten in 1911.
- The Säntisbahn, which opened between Appenzell and Wasserauen in 1912.

The Appenzellerbahn and Säntisbahn merged in 1947, retaining the Appenzellerbahn (AB) identity. The St. Gallen–Gais–Appenzell-Bahn and Altstätten-Gais-Bahn merged in 1948, under the name St. Gallen–Gais–Appenzell–Altstätten-Bahn (SGA).

The Appenzeller Bahnen company was formed in 1988, with the merger of the Appenzellerbahn and the St. Gallen–Gais–Appenzell–Altstätten-Bahn. In 2006, the Appenzeller Bahnen company merged with the Rorschach–Heiden-Bergbahn, the Rheineck–Walzenhausen-Bergbahn and the Trogenerbahn companies. In legal terms, this merger took the form of the Appenzeller Bahnen company acquiring the other companies.

In 2021 the company merged with Frauenfeld-Wil-Bahn AG, owner of the Frauenfeld–Wil line. The two companies had shared operations for years.

== Operation ==
Today, the company operates the following railway lines:

- Appenzell–St. Gallen–Trogen
- Gossau–Appenzell–Wasserauen
- Altstaetten–Gais
- Rheineck–Walzenhausen
- Rorschach–Heiden
- Frauenfeld–Wil

The St. Gallen–Gais–Appenzell, Gossau–Appenzell–Wasserauen and Altstätten–Gais lines form a connected network of 1,000 mm or 3 ft 3 3/8 in metre gauge lines, all electrified at 1500 V DC. The St. Gallen–Trogen line is also of metre gauge, but ran independently until 2018.

From 2016 to 2018, the Appenzellerbahnen undertook a large construction project to connect the Appenzell-St. Gallen and St. Gallen-Trogen lines. The three points of incompatibility were electrification (the St. Gallen-Trogen line was 1000 V DC with a brief stretch at 600 V DC shared with the St. Gallen trolleybus system), different (but physically adjacent) termini in St. Gallen, and maximal grades (the rack railway approach to St. Gallen from Appenzell was too steep for adhesion-based St. Gallen-Trogen rolling stock). So the new project re-electrified the St. Gallen-Trogen line at 1500 V DC and constructed a new Ruckhalde tunnel through St. Gallen. The old alignment through St. Gallen closed in April 2018, and the system began through-running in October of the same year.

The Rheineck–Walzenhausen and Rorschach–Heiden lines are geographically separate from the rest of the network, and are of respectively 1,200 mm (3 ft 11 1/4 in) and standard (1,435 mm or 4 ft 8 1/2 in) gauges. The Altstaetten–Gais, Rheineck–Walzenhausen and Rorschach–Heiden lines all have rack railway sections, whilst the Gossau–Appenzell–Wasserauen and Appenzell–St. Gallen–Trogen lines are adhesion only. Frauenfeld-Wil was cooperating closely, but legally distinct from 2003. It is not connected by tracks. 2021 they were taken over.

The company also operates a bus service from Teufen, on the St. Gallen–Gais–Appenzell line, to Speicher, on the St. Gallen–Trogen line. Night bus services are operated over the routes of the St. Gallen–Gais–Appenzell and St. Gallen–Trogen lines.

== Services ==
As of December 2023, Appenzell Railways (AB) operates eight regional train services that run on its own railway network. Trains operate as S-Bahn services (numbered 15, 20‒26 with "S" prefix) for St. Gallen S-Bahn (some also for Bodensee S-Bahn). In addition, AB also operate bus line 190.

#	Route	Notes
S15	Wil SG–Wängi–Frauenfeld	Operates over the metre (3 ft 3 3/8 in) gauge Frauenfeld–Wil line
S20	Appenzell–Gais–Bühler–Teufen AR–St. Gallen–Speicher–Trogen	Operates over the metre (3 ft 3 3/8 in) gauge Appenzell–St. Gallen–Trogen line. Rush-hour service, calls between Gais and St. Gallen only at Bühler, Teufen AR and Niederteufen
S21	Appenzell–Gais–Bühler–Teufen AR–St. Gallen–Speicher–Trogen	Operates over the metre (3 ft 3 3/8 in) gauge Appenzell–St. Gallen–Trogen line
S22	Teufen AR–St. Gallen–Speicher–Trogen	Operates over the metre (3 ft 3 3/8 in) gauge Appenzell–St. Gallen–Trogen line. Only during rush hour
S23	Gossau SG–Herisau–Urnäsch–Appenzell–Wasserauen	Operates over the metre (3 ft 3 3/8 in) gauge Gossau–Wasserauen line
S24	Altstätten Stadt–Stoss–Gais	Operates over the metre (3 ft 3 3/8 in) gauge Altstätten–Gais line (part rack railway)
S25	Rorschach Hafen–Rorschach–Wienacht-Tobel–Heiden	Operates over the standard gauge Rorschach–Heiden line (part rack railway)
S26	Rheineck–Ruderbach–Walzenhausen	Operates over the 1,200 mm (3 ft 11 1/4 in) gauge Rheineck–Walzenhausen line (part rack railway)
190	Teufen AR–Speicher–Speicherschwendi–St. Gallen, Neudorf	Bus service

== Rolling stock ==
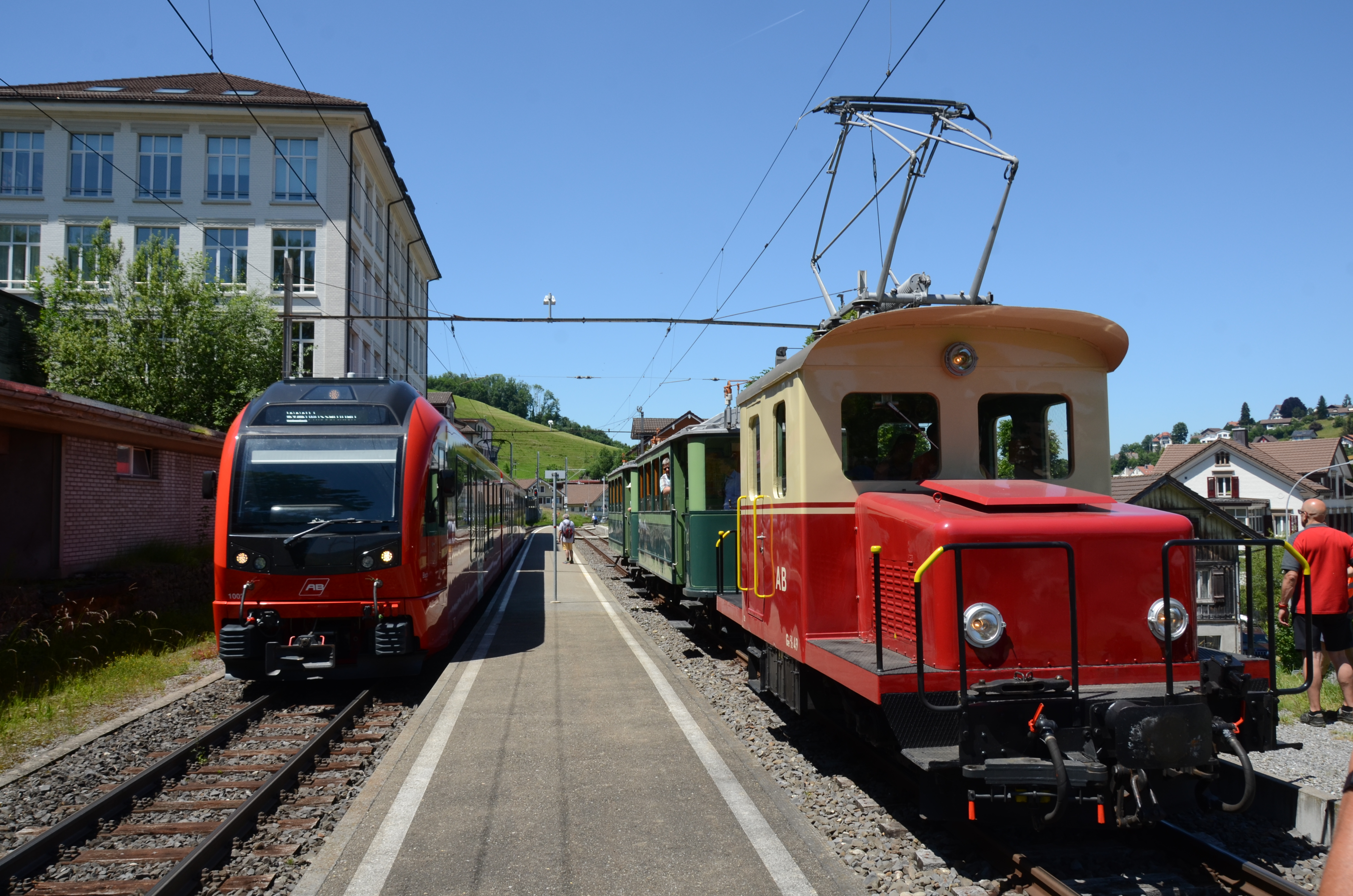
ABe 4/12 (Stadler Walzer), operating as S23 service, and a nostaglic train of AB at Wilen

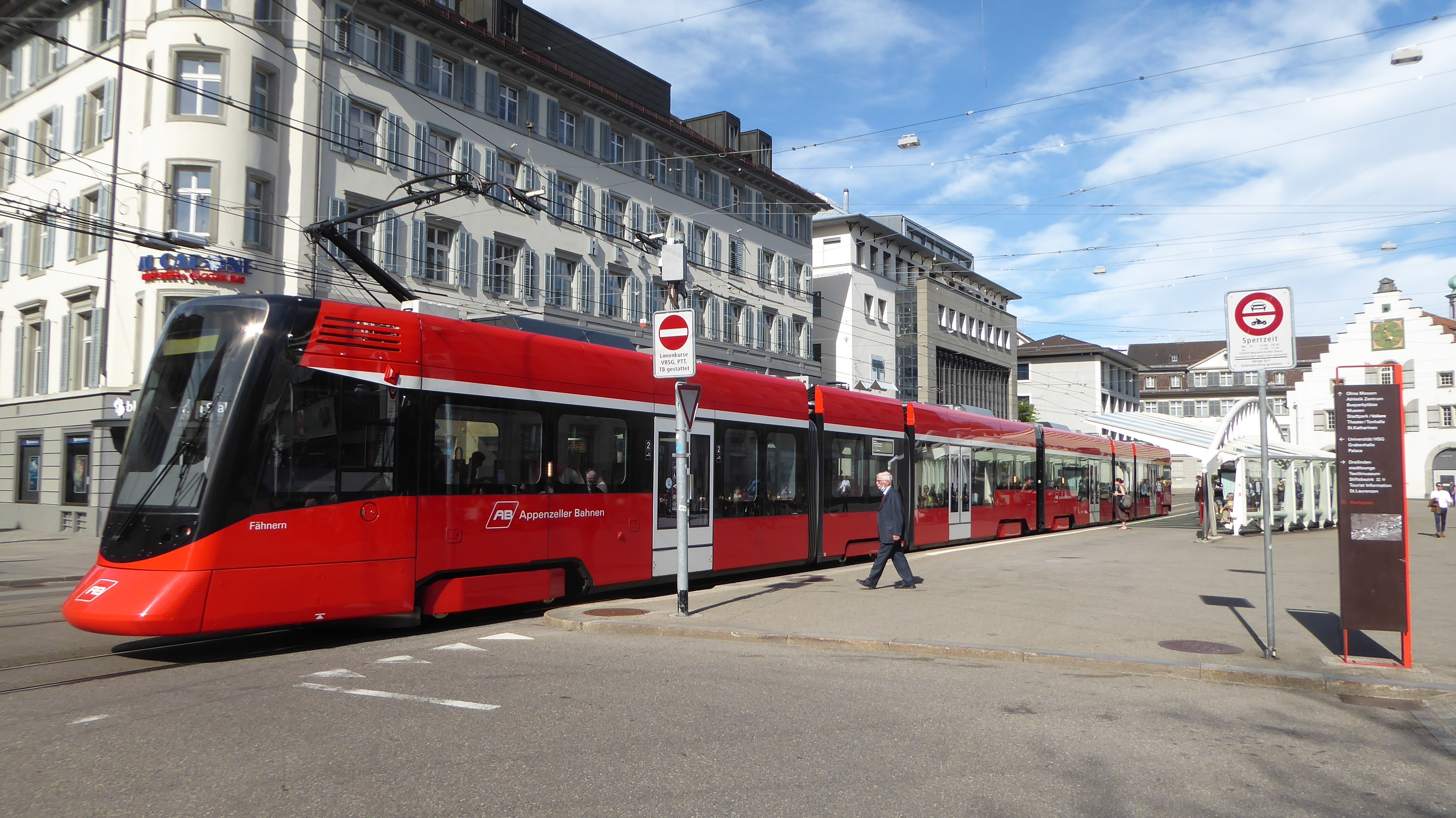
Stadler Tango light rail operating as S21 service at St. Gallen Marktplatz station

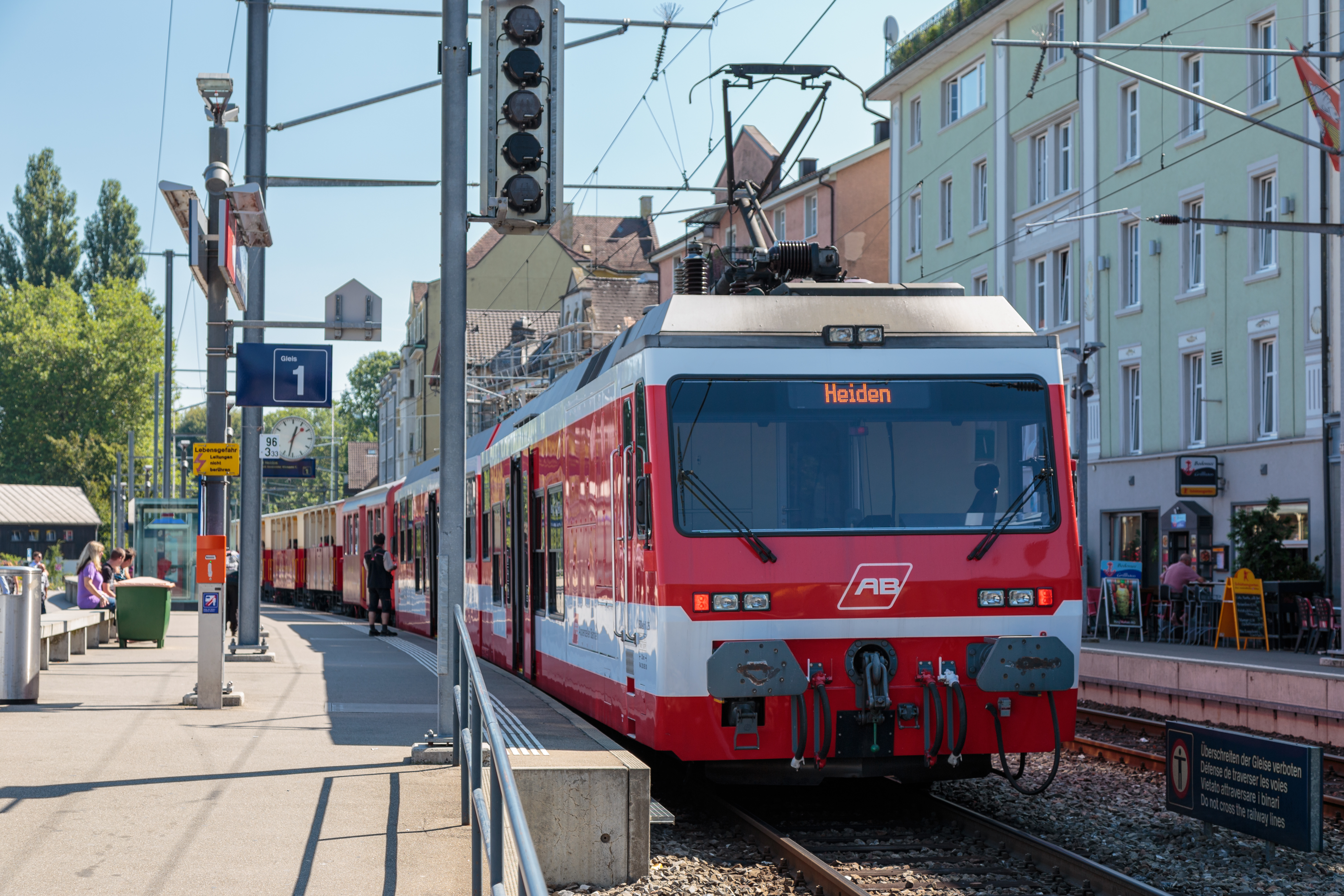
BDeh 3/6 of AB operating as S25 service between Rorschach Hafen and Heiden (with additional open-window coaches during good weather conditions)

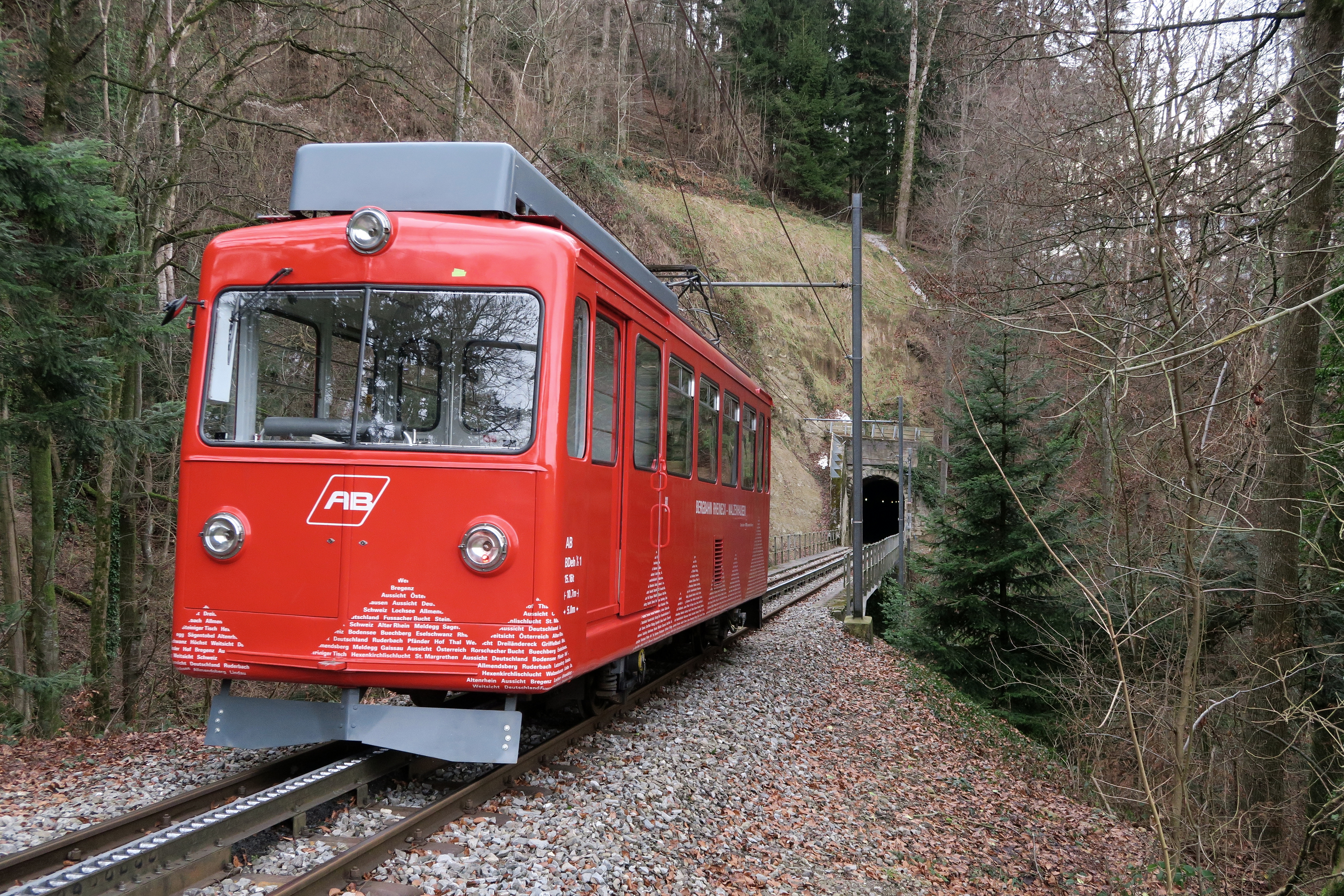
BDeh 1/2 rack railway operating as S26 service between Rheineck and Walzenhausen

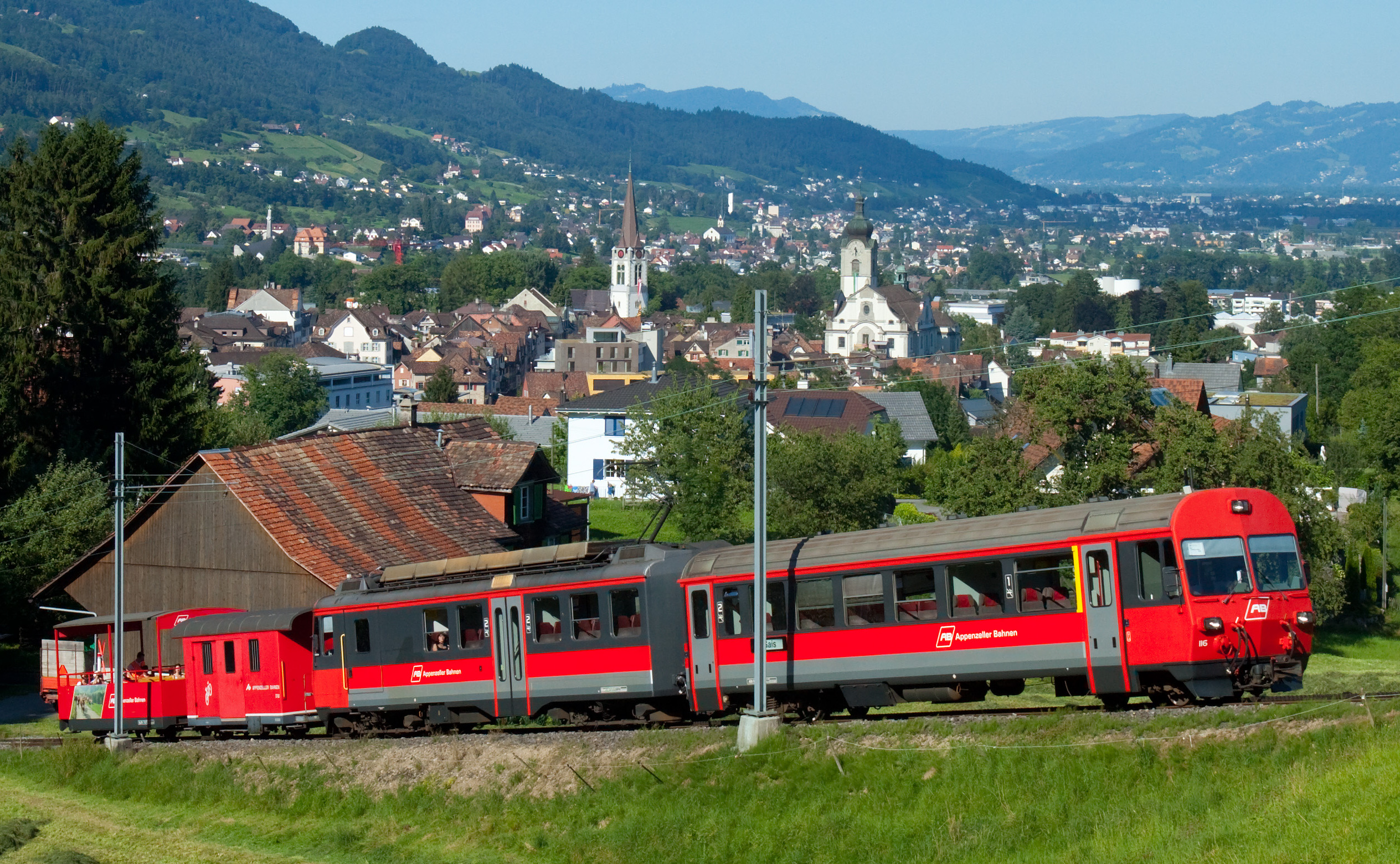
BDeh 4/4 of AB operating as S24 service between Altstätten Stadt and Gais (with additional open window coaches during good weather conditions)

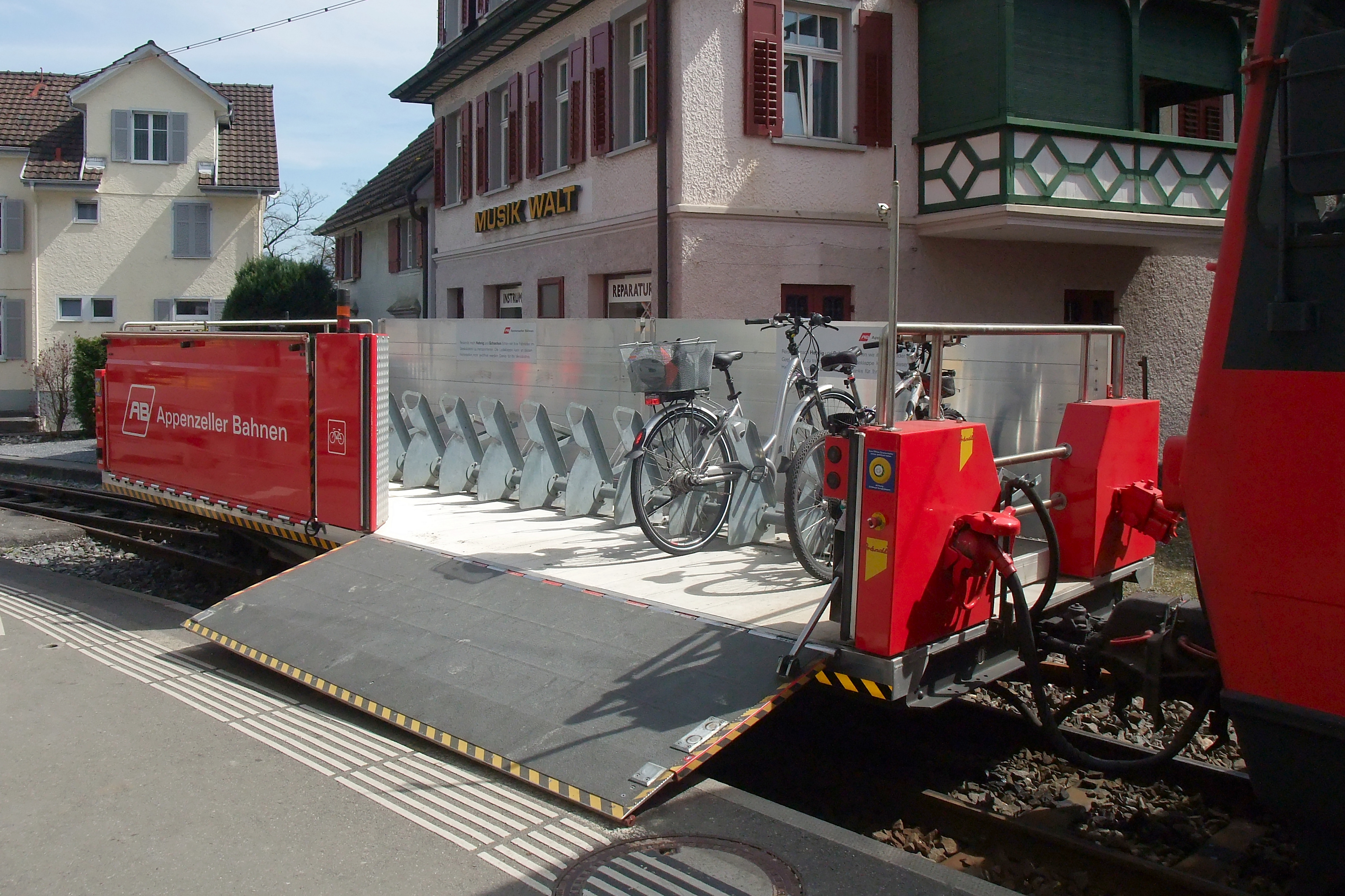
Bicycle transport of S24 service (only during good weather conditions)

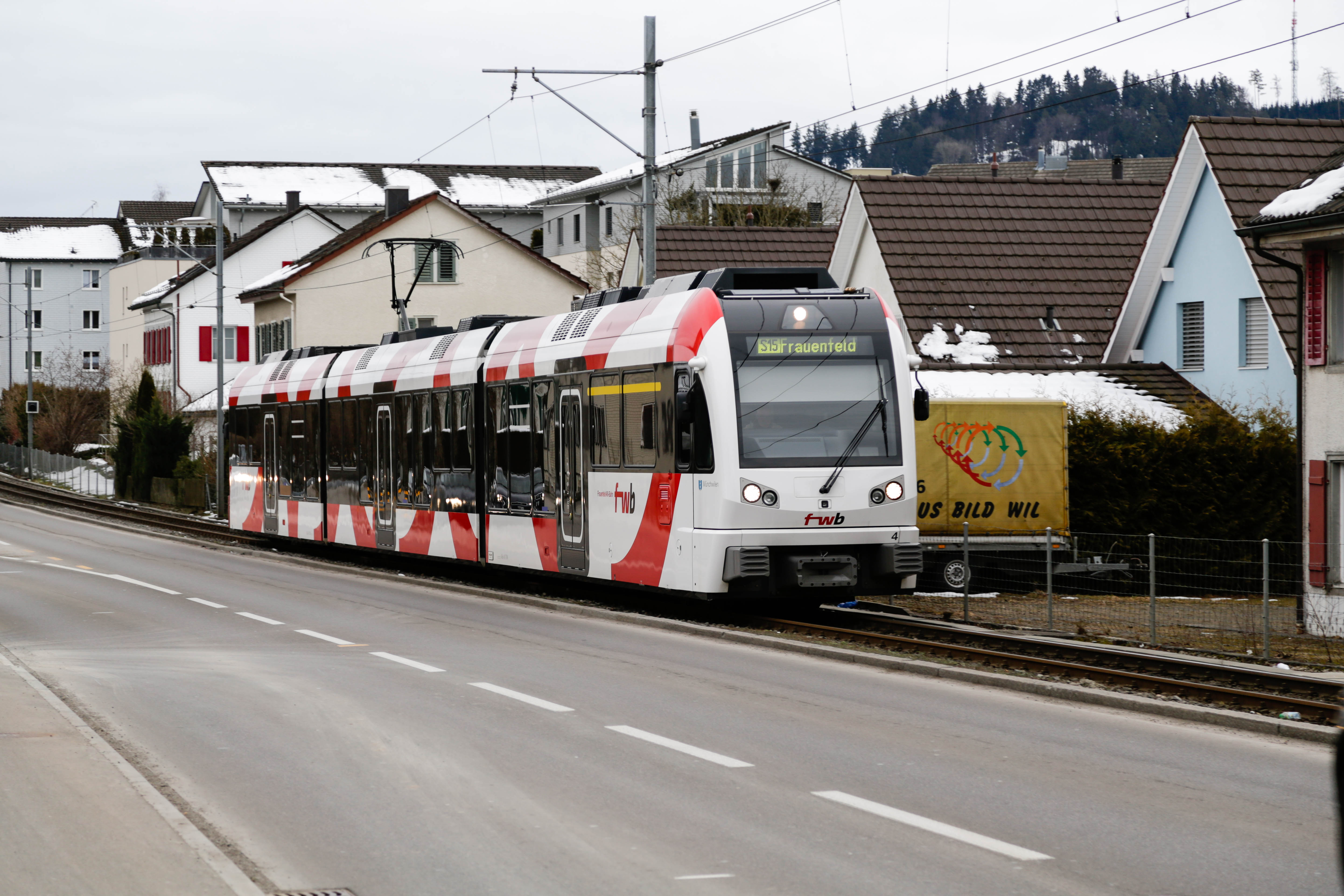
ABe 4/8 operating as S15 service between Wil SG and Frauenfeld (operated by AB since 2021)

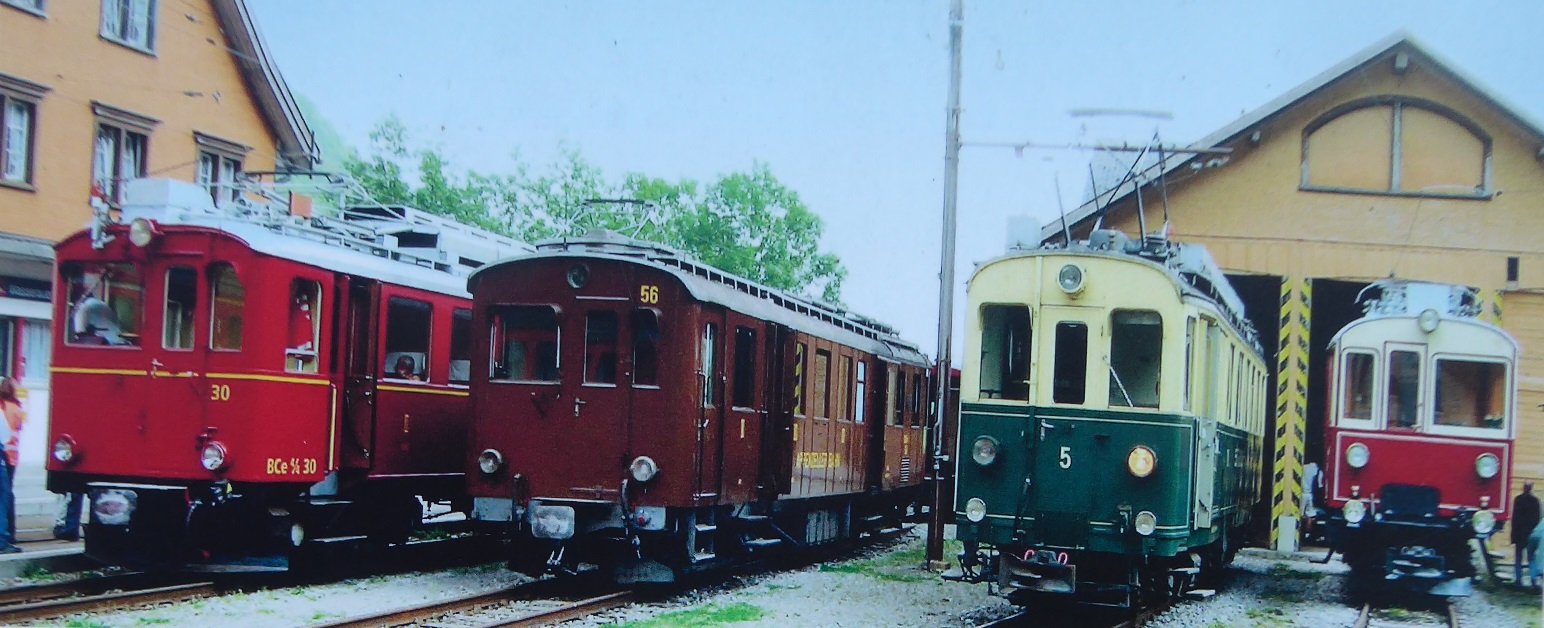
Historic vehicles of AB

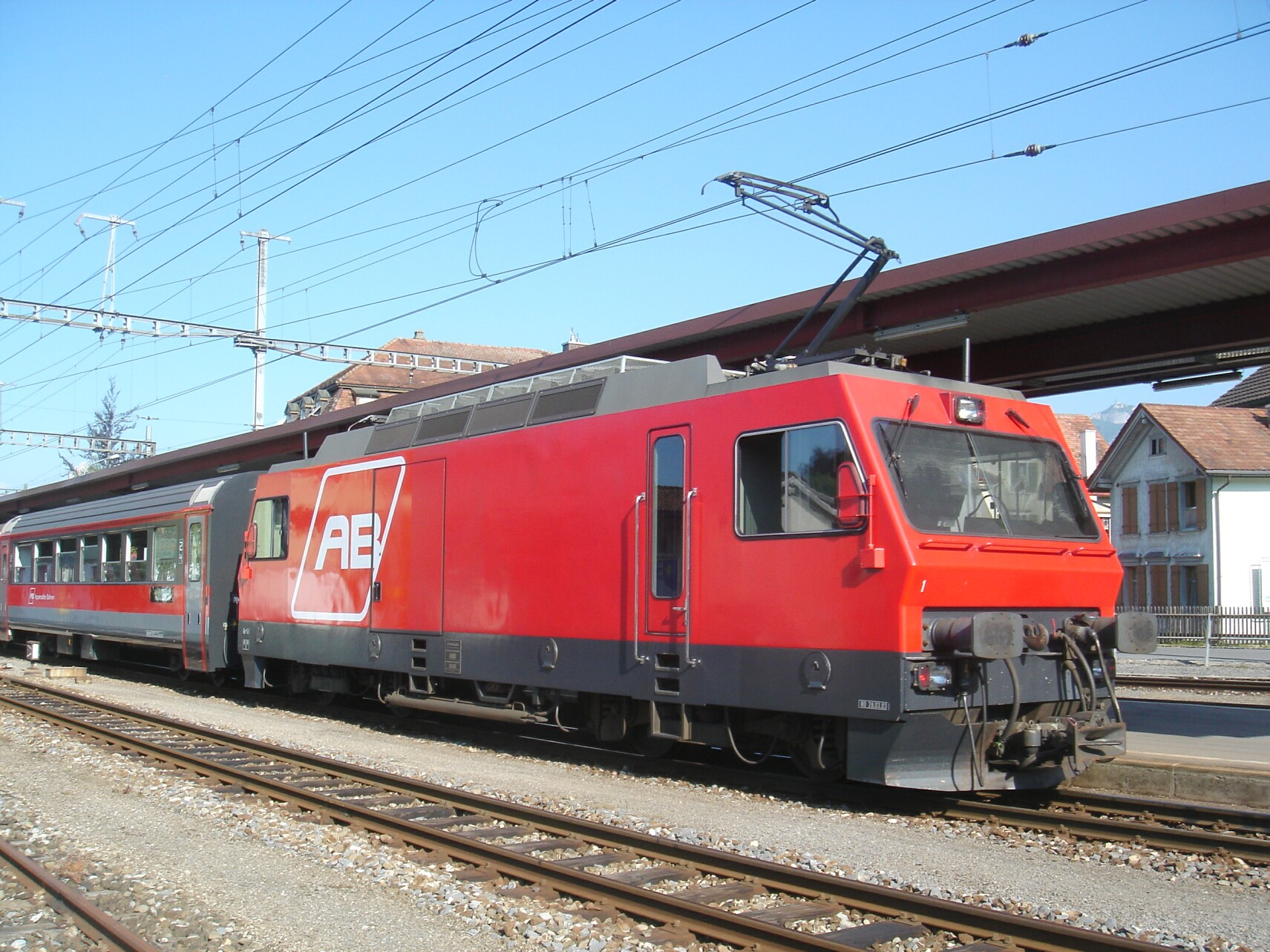
Former Ge 4/4 locomotive of AB push-pulling coaches in 2006

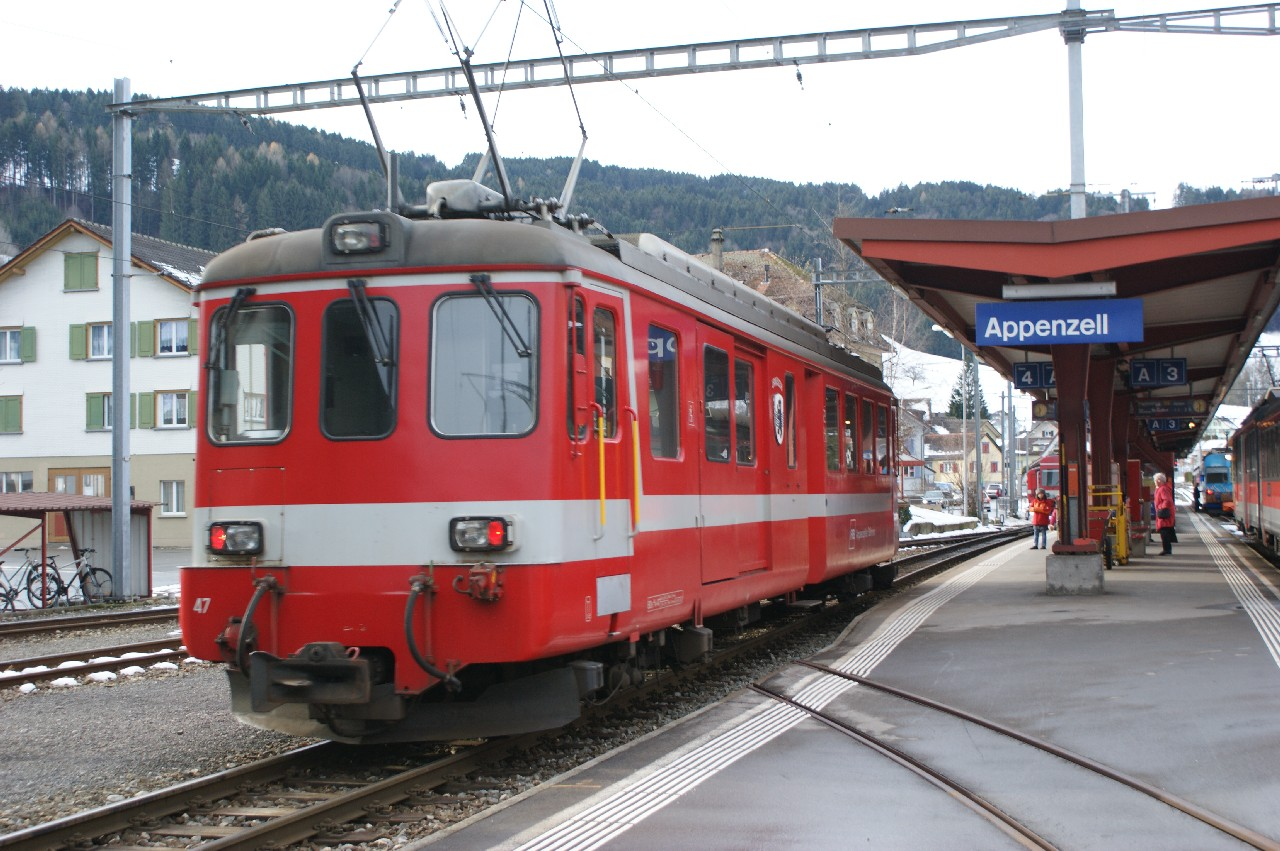
Former BDe 4/4 locomotive of AB

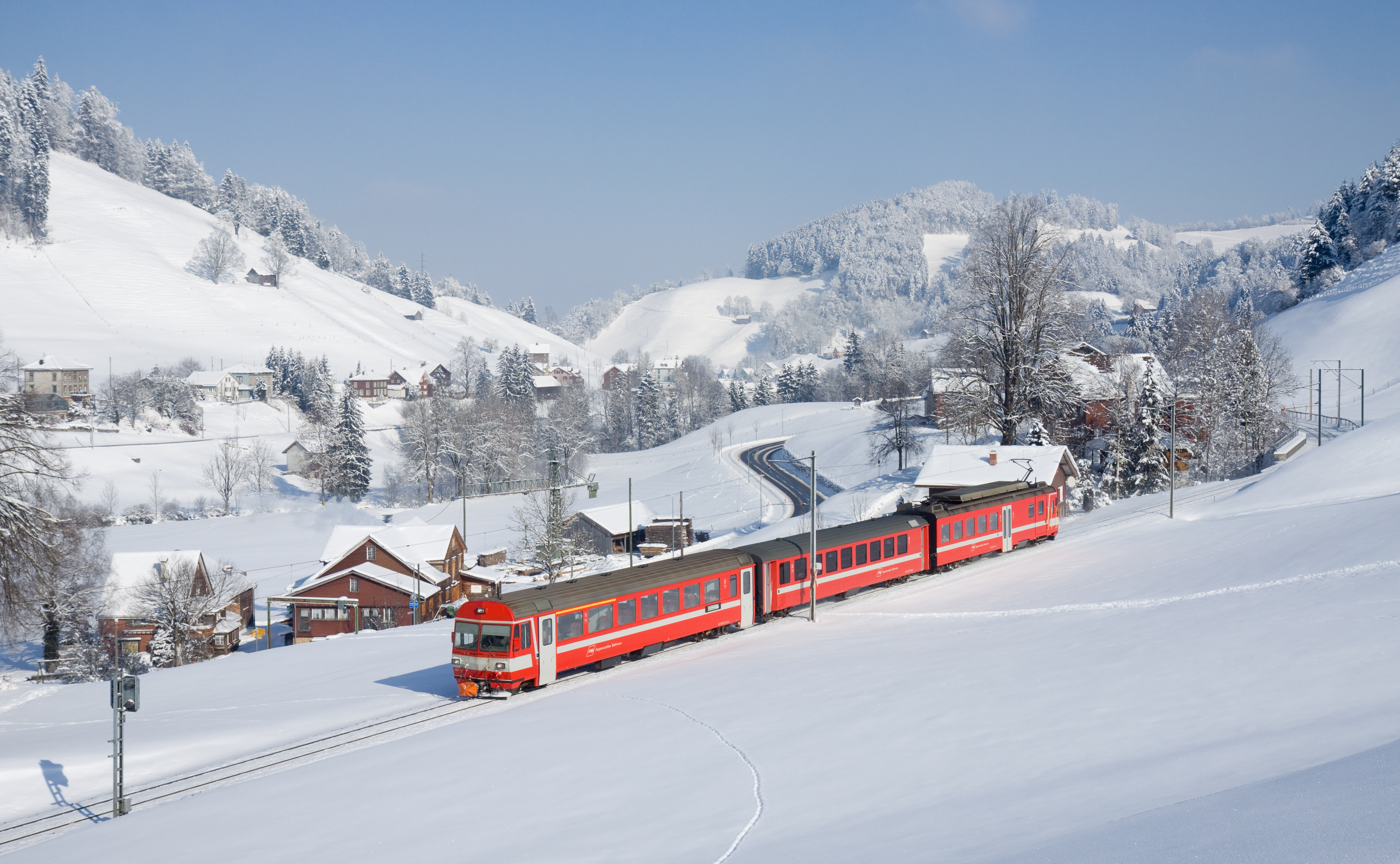
Former BDe 4/4 of AB between Urnäsch and Jakobsbad in 2012 (photo: Kabelleger)

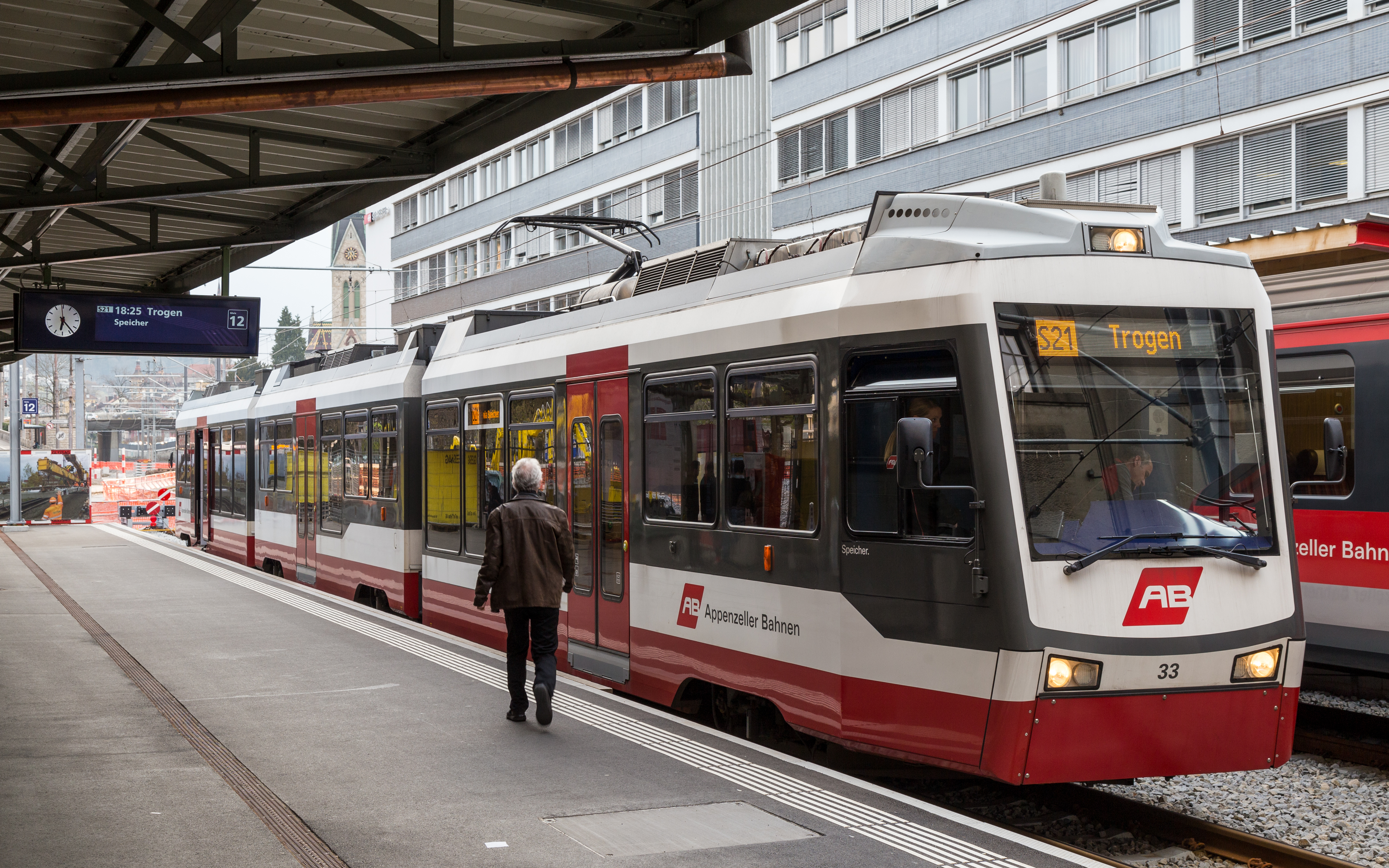
Former Be 4/8 of AB in St. Gallen on the St. Gallen–Trogen railway line in 2017 (sold to transN in 2019)
