= Heiden railway station =

Train station in Heiden, Switzerland

Heiden
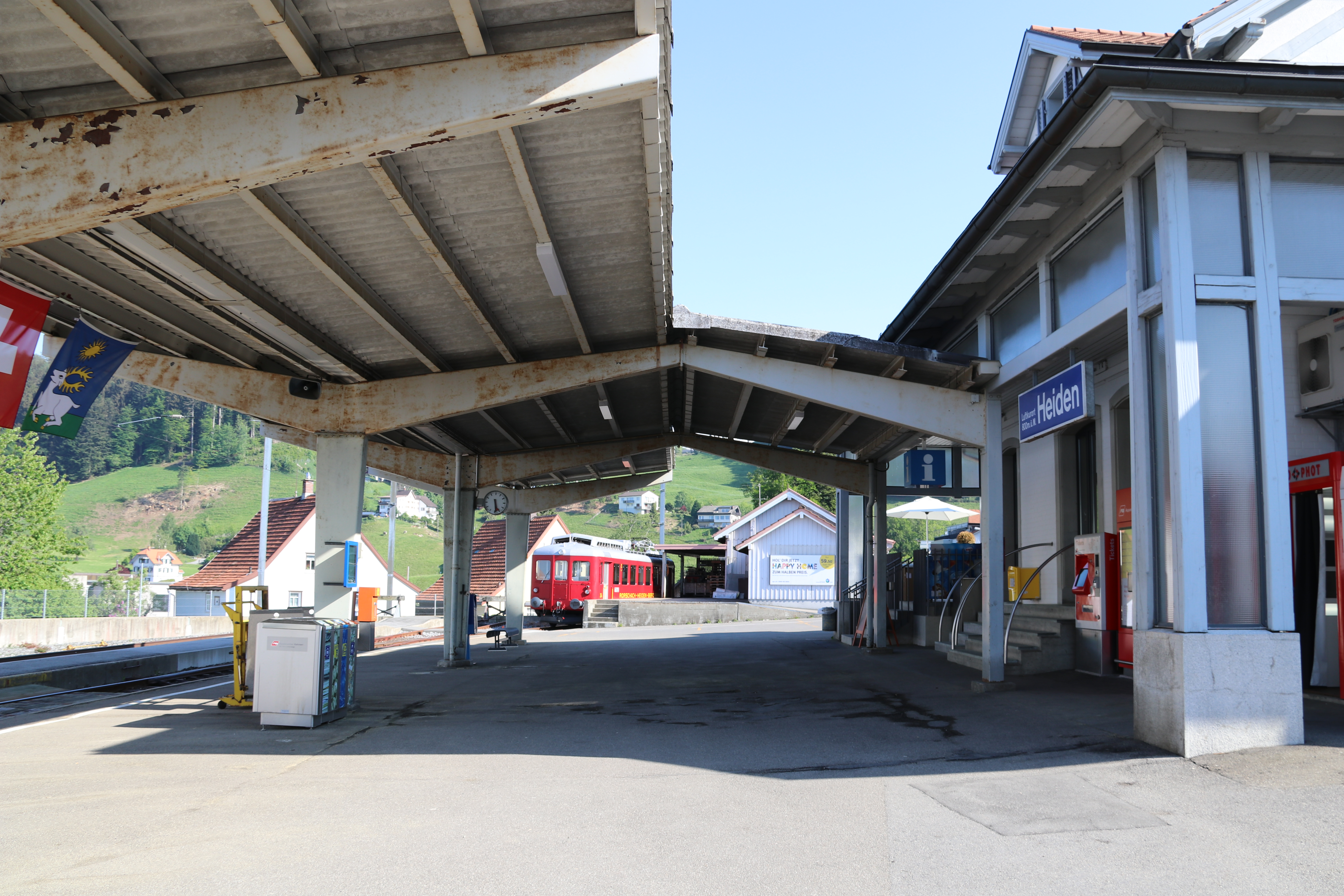
- The station building in 2018

General information
- Location: Switzerland
- Coordinates: 47°26′46″N 9°32′13″E
- Elevation: 794 m (2,605 ft)
- Owner: Appenzell Railways
- Line: Rorschach–Heiden railway
- Train operators: Appenzell Railways

Other information
- Fare zone: 241 (Tarifverbund Ostwind)

Services
Preceding station	St. Gallen S-Bahn	Following station
Schwendi bei Heiden towards Rorschach Hafen	S25	Terminus
Location
- Location within Switzerland Location within Canton of Appenzell Ausserrhoden

Heiden railway station (German: Bahnhof Heiden) is a railway station in Heiden, in the Swiss canton of Appenzell Ausserrhoden. It is the upper terminus of the Rorschach–Heiden mountain rack railway line of Appenzell Railways.

== Services ==
As of the December 2023 timetable change, the following services stop at Heiden:

- St. Gallen S-Bahn:
  - S25: hourly service to Rorschach Hafen via Rorschach.
