= Rorschach Hafen railway station =

Railway station in Switzerland

Rorschach Hafen
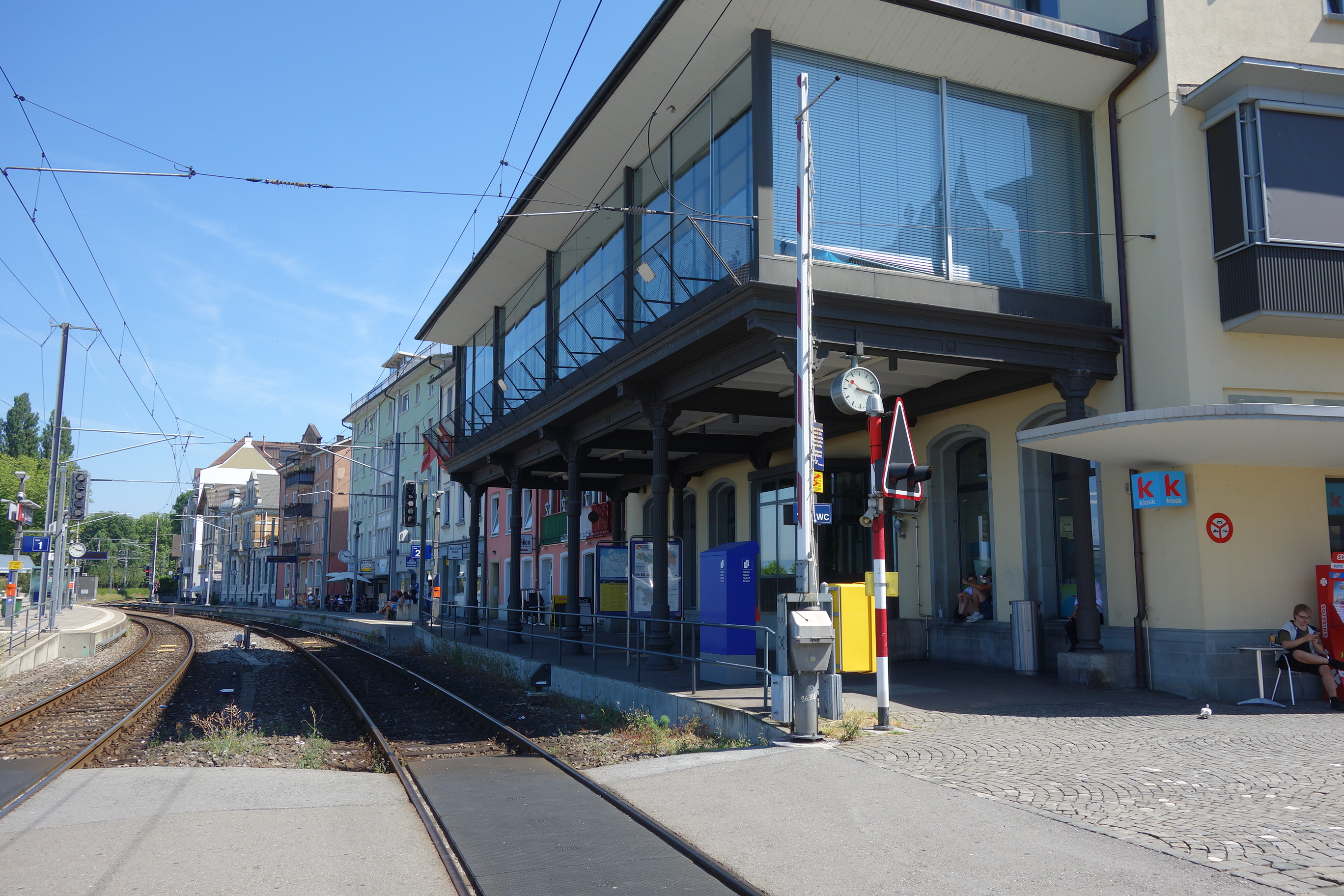
- The station building in 2019

General information
- Location: Rorschach; Switzerland
- Coordinates: 47°29′N 9°29′E
- Elevation: 398 m (1,306 ft)
- Owner: Swiss Federal Railways
- Line: Lake line
- Distance: 96.3 km (59.8 mi) from Zürich Hauptbahnhof
- Train operators: THURBO; Appenzell Railways

Other information
- Fare zone: 231 (Tarifverbund Ostwind)

Services
| Preceding station | St. Gallen S-Bahn | Following station |
|---|---|---|
| Horn towards Weinfelden | S7 | Rorschach towards Lindau-Insel |
| Terminus | S25 | Rorschach towards Heiden |
Location
- Location within Switzerland Location within Canton of St. Gallen

Rorschach Hafen railway station (German: Bahnhof Rorschach Hafen) is a railway station in Rorschach, in the Swiss canton of St. Gallen. It is located on the Lake line of Swiss Federal Railways. It is adjacent to a ferry terminal with service to Lindau and Wasserburg am Bodensee across Lake Constance.

Rorschach Hafen is one of three stations within the municipality of Rorschach, along with Rorschach (the next station east on the Lake line) and Rorschach Stadt, approximately 400 metres (1,300 ft) to the south on the Rorschach–St. Gallen line.

== Services ==
As of the December 2021 timetable change, the following services stop at Rorschach Hafen:

- St. Gallen S-Bahn:
  - S7: half-hourly service between Rorschach and Romanshorn and hourly service to Weinfelden; on Saturdays and Sundays, service every two hours from Rorschach to Lindau-Reutin via Bregenz.
  - S25: hourly service to Heiden via Rorschach and Wienacht-Tobel.
