= List of members of the Swiss Council of States (2019–2023) =

This is a list of members of the Swiss Council of States of the 51st legislature (2019–2023). The members were elected in the 2019 Swiss federal election.

== Elected members ==
Canton	Seat 1	Party	Seat 2	Party
Zürich	Daniel Jositsch	Social Democratic Party	Ruedi Noser	FDP.The Liberals
Bern	Werner Salzmann	Swiss People's Party	Hans Stöckli*	Social Democratic Party
Lucerne	Andrea Gmür-Schönenberger	Christian Democratic People's Party	Damian Müller	FDP.The Liberals
Uri	Heidi Z’graggen	Christian Democratic People's Party	Josef Dittli	FDP.The Liberals
Schwyz	Othmar Reichmuth	Christian Democratic People's Party	Alex Kuprecht*	Swiss People's Party
Obwalden	Erich Ettlin	Christian Democratic People's Party	N/A	
Nidwalden	Hans Wicki	FDP.The Liberals	N/A	
Glarus	Thomas Hefti	FDP.The Liberals	Mathias Zopfi	Green Party
Zug	Matthias Michel	FDP.The Liberals	Peter Hegglin	Christian Democratic People's Party
Fribourg	Christian Levrat*	Social Democratic Party	Johanna Gapany	FDP.The Liberals
Solothurn	Pirmin Bischof*	Christian Democratic People's Party	Roberto Zanetti*	Social Democratic Party
Basel-Stadt	Eva Herzog	Social Democratic Party	N/A	
Basel-Landschaft	Maya Graf	Green Party	N/A	
Schaffhausen	Hannes Germann*	Swiss People's Party	Thomas Minder*	Independent
Appenzell Outer-Rhodes	Andrea Caroni	FDP.The Liberals	N/A	
Appenzell Inner-Rhodes	Daniel Fässler	Christian Democratic People's Party	N/A	
St. Gallen	Benedikt Würth	Christian Democratic People's Party	Paul Rechsteiner*	Social Democratic Party
Grisons	Stefan Engler*	Christian Democratic People's Party	Martin Schmid*	FDP.The Liberals
Aargau	Thierry Burkart	FDP.The Liberals	Hansjörg Knecht	Swiss People's Party
Thurgau	Jakob Stark	Swiss People's Party	Brigitte Häberli-Koller*	Christian Democratic People's Party
Ticino	Marco Chiesa	Swiss People's Party	Marina Carobbio Guscetti	Social Democratic Party
Vaud	Olivier Français	FDP.The Liberals	Adèle Thorens Goumaz*	Green Party
Valais	Marianne Maret	Christian Democratic People's Party	Beat Rieder	Christian Democratic People's Party
Neuchâtel	Philippe Bauer	FDP.The Liberals	Céline Vara	Green Party
Geneva	Lisa Mazzone	Green Party	Carlo Sommaruga	Social Democratic Party
Jura	Élisabeth Baume-Schneider	Social Democratic Party	Charles Juillard	Christian Democratic People's Party
* indicates a candidate that was re-elected.

== See also ==
- List of members of the Swiss Council of States (2023–2027)
- List of presidents of the Swiss Council of States
- Political parties of Switzerland for the abbreviations
