= List of members of the Swiss Council of States (2023–2027) =

This is a list of members of the Swiss Council of States of the 51st legislature (2023–2027). The members were elected in the 2023 Swiss federal election.

== List ==
Name	Party	Canton	Birth date	Council of States since	Profession
Thierry Burkart	FDP	Aargau	Aug 21, 1975	Dec 2, 2019	Lawyer
Marianne Binder-Keller	Mitte	Aargau	June 15, 1958		Communications consultant
Andrea Caroni	FDP	Appenzell Ausserrhoden	Apr 19, 1980	Nov 30, 2015	Lawyer
Daniel Fässler	Mitte	Appenzell Innerrhoden	Aug 22, 1960	June 3, 2019	Landammann
Maya Graf	Grüne	Basel-Landschaft	Feb. 28, 1962	Dec 2, 2019	Organic farmer
Eva Herzog	SP	Basel-Stadt	Dec. 25, 1961	Dec 2, 2019	historian
Flavia Wasserfallen	SP	Bern	Feb. 7, 1979		Political scientist
Werner Salzmann	SVP	Bern	Nov 5, 1962	Dec 2, 2019	Tax advisor and association president
Isabelle Chassot	Mitte	Freiburg	March 18, 1965	Nov 29, 2021	lawyer
Johanna Gapany	FDP	Freiburg	July 25, 1988	Dec 2, 2019	Economist
Mauro Poggia	MCG	Geneva	April 25, 1959		Lawyer
Carlo Sommaruga	SP	Geneva	July 8, 1959	Dec 2, 2019	Lawyer
Benjamin Mühlemann	FDP	Glarus	February 1, 1979	October 22, 2023	Journalist and communicator
Mathias Zopfi	Grüne	Glarus	Dec 14, 1983	Dec 2, 2019	Lawyer
Stefan Engler	Mitte	Graubünden	May 30, 1960	Dec 5, 2011	Lawyer, former government councilor
Martin Schmid	FDP	Graubünden	May 24, 1969	Dec 5, 2011	Lawyer, former government councilor
Mathilde Crevoisier Crelier	SP	Jura	Jan 5, 1980	Dec 15, 2022	translator
Charles Juillard	Mitte	Jura	Dec. 17, 1962	Dec 2, 2019	Governing Council
Damian Müller	FDP	Luzern	Oct. 25, 1984	Nov 30, 2015	PR consultant
Andrea Gmür-Schönenberger	Mitte	Luzern	July 17, 1964	Dec 2, 2019	Managing Director (Foundation)
Baptiste Hurni	SP	Neuchâtel	April 4, 1986		Lawyer
Céline Vara	Grüne	Neuchâtel	Oct. 4, 1984	Dec 2, 2019	Lawyer
Hans Wicki	FDP	Nidwalden	Feb. 18, 1964	Nov 30, 2015	Former government councilor
Erich Ettlin	Mitte	Obwalden	May 30, 1962	Nov 30, 2015	tax consultant
Hannes Germann	SVP	Schaffhausen	July 1, 1956	Sep 16 2002	Business economist and association president
Severin Brüngger	FDP	Schaffhausen	April 18, 1978	Sep 9 2025	airline pilot
Pirmin Schwander	SVP	Schwyz	Dec. 28, 1961		Entrepreneur
Petra Gössi	FDP	Schwyz	Jan 12, 1976		lawyer
Pirmin Bischof	Mitte	Solothurn	Feb. 24, 1959	Dec 12, 2011	Lawyer
Franziska Roth	SP	Solothurn	April 17, 1966		Special education teacher
Benedikt Würth	Mitte	St. Gallen	Jan 20, 1968	June 3, 2019	Former government councilor
Esther Friedli	SVP	St. Gallen	June 4, 1977	May 30, 2023	Political scientist and restaurateur
Marco Chiesa	SVP	Ticino	Oct. 10, 1974	Dec 2, 2019	business economist
Fabio Regazzi	Mitte	Ticino	June 22, 1962		Entrepreneur
Brigitte Häberli-Koller	Mitte	Thurgau	Aug 23, 1958	Dec 5, 2011	clerk
Jakob Stark	SVP	Thurgau	Sep 8 1958	Dec 2, 2019	Governing Council
Josef Dittli	FDP	Uri	April 11, 1957	Nov 30, 2015	Former government councilor
Heidi Z’graggen	Mitte	Uri	February 1, 1966	Dec 2, 2019	Government councilor
Beat Rieder	Mitte	Valais	Feb. 12, 1963	Nov 30, 2015	Lawyer
Marianne Maret	Mitte	Valais	June 15, 1958	Dec 2, 2019	Commercial clerk
Pascal Broulis	FDP	Vaud	April 3, 1965		Bank clerk, former state councilor
Pierre-Yves Maillard	SP	Vaud	March 16, 1968		Trade union official, former state councilor
Peter Hegglin	Mitte	Zug	Dec. 25, 1960	Nov 30, 2015	Former government councilor
Matthias Michel	FDP	Zug	March 20, 1963	Dec 2, 2019	Lawyer
Daniel Jositsch	SP	Zürich	March 25, 1965	Dec 8, 2015	Criminal law professor
Tiana Angelina Moser	GLP	Zürich	April 6, 1979		Political scientist

== See also ==
- List of members of the National Council of Switzerland (2023–2027)
