= List of 2005 Swiss incumbents =

This is a list of 2005 Swiss incumbents.

== Federal offices ==
=== Swiss Federal Council ===
Members of the Swiss Federal Council, ordered by seniority

- Moritz Leuenberger (SP) -- Vice-President of the Confederation 2010
- Micheline Calmy-Rey (SP)
- Hans-Rudolf Merz (FDP)
- Doris Leuthard (CVP) -- President of the Confederation 2010
- Eveline Widmer-Schlumpf (BDP)
- Ueli Maurer (SVP)
- Didier Burkhalter (FDP)

=== Federal parliament ===
- Pascale Bruderer -- President of the National Council
- Erika Forster-Vannini -- President of the Council of States

== Cantonal office-holders ==
Data on the cantonal executive council and parliament, as of January 1, 2005. The president is generally elected for one year. As dates and terms vary, they are generally stated. Names and official titles in local languages are given. Sorting is alphabetical, the president and vice-president first.

=== AG, AI, AR, BL, BS, BE, FR, GE, GL ===
==== Aargau ====
- Executive: Regierungsrat (2001–2005)
  - Roland Brogli
  - Peter C. Beyeler, Landammann
  - Alex Hürzeler
  - Susanne Hochuli
  - Urs Hofmann
- Parliament: Grosser Rat

==== Appenzell Innerrhoden ====
- Executive: Standeskommission
  - Carlo Schmid, Regierender Landammann
  - Bruno Koster, Stillstehender Landammann
  - Werner Ebneter
  - Lorenz Koller
  - Melchior Looser
  - Hans Sutter
  - Paul Wyser
- Parliament: Grosser Rat (2003–2007)
  - Regula Knechtle, president

==== Appenzell Ausserrhoden ====
- Executive: Regierungsrat
  - Alice Scherrer-Baumann, Landammann
  - Hans Altherr
  - Jakob Brunnschweiler
  - Rolf Degen
  - Hans Diem
  - Köbi Frei
  - Jürg Wernli
- Parliament: Kantonsrat
  - Peter Langenauer, president 2003/2004

==== Basel-Country ====
- Executive: Regierungsrat (July 1, 2003 - June 30, 2007)
  - Adrian Ballmer, Regierungspräsident 2004/2005
  - Elsbeth Schneider-Kenel, Vizepräsidentin 2004/2005
  - Sabine Pegoraro
  - Erich Straumann
  - Urs Wüthrich
- Parliament: Landrat
  - Daniela Schneeberger, president 2004/2005

==== Basel-City ====
- Executive: Regierungsrat (- February 2, 2005)
  - Jörg Schild, Regierungspräsident 2004
  - Ueli Vischer, Regierungsvizepräsident 2004
  - Carlo Conti
  - Christoph Eymann
  - Ralph Lewin
  - Barbara Schneider
  - Hans Martin Tschudi
- Parliament: Grossrat
  - Beatrice Inglin-Buomberger, president 2004/2005

==== Bern ====
- Executive: Executive Council of Bern, Regierungsrat or Conseil-exécutif
  - Werner Luginbühl, President of the Government (Regierungspräsident / Président du Conseil-exécutif) for 2006/2007
  - Urs Gasche, Vice President of the Government (Vizepräsident des Regierungsrates / Vice-président du Conseil-exécutif) for 2006/2007
  - Barbara Egger-Jenzer
  - Hans-Jürg Käser
  - Philippe Perrenoud
  - Bernhard Pulver
  - Andreas Rickenbacher
- Chancellor (Staatsschreiber / Chancelier) and government chief of staff is Kurt Nuspliger.
- Parliament: Grand Council of Bern (Grosser Rat / Grand conseil)
  - Werner Lüthi, President for 2006/2007

==== Fribourg-Freiburg ====
- Executive: Conseil d'Etat or Staatsrat
  - Ruth Lüthi, Présidente 2005
  - Isabelle Chassot
  - Pascal Corminboeuf
  - Claude Grandjean
  - Claude Lässer
  - Michel Pittet
  - Beat Vonlanthen
- Parliament: Grand Conseil or Grosser Rat (2002–2006)
  - Anne-Claude Demierre, president 2005

==== Geneva ====
- Executive: Conseil d'Etat (November 2001 - 2005)
  - Martine Brunschwig Graf, Présidente du Conseil d'Etat (2004–2005)
  - Carlo Lamprecht, Vice-Président du Conseil d'Etat (2004–2005)
  - Charles Beer
  - Robert Cramer
  - Laurent Moutinot
  - Micheline Spoerri
  - Pierre-François Unger
- Parliament: Grand Conseil
  - Marie-Françoise de Tassigny, president (November 2004 - November 2005)

==== Glarus ====
- Executive: Regierungsrat (2002–2006)
  - Jakob Kamm, Landammann
  - Willy Kamm, Landesstatthalter
  - Marianne Dürst-Kundert
  - Pankraz Freitag
  - Robert Marti
  - Franz Schiesser
  - Rolf Widmer
- Parliament: Landrat
  - Rico Bertini, president 2004/2005

=== GR, JU, LU, NE, NW, OW, SH, SZ ===
==== Graubünden-Grischun-Grigioni ====
- Executive: Regierungsrat, regenza, Governo (January 1, 2003 - December 31, 2006)
  - Eveline Widmer-Schlumpf, Regierungspräsidentin, presidenta da la regenza, Presidente del Governo 2005
  - Claudio Lardi, vice-president 2005
  - Stefan Engler
  - Martin Schmid
  - Hansjörg Trachsel
- Parliament: Grosser Rat, cussegl grond, Grand Consiglio
  - Christian Möhr, president 2004/2005, Standespräsident

==== Jura ====
- Executive: Conseil d'Etat (2003–2006)
  - Claude Hêche, Président 2005
  - Elisabeth Baume-Schneider, Vice-présidente 2005
  - Jean-François Roth
  - Laurent Schaffter
  - Gérald Schaller
- Parliament: parlement (2003–2006)
  - Alain Schweingruber, president 2005

==== Lucerne ====
- Executive: Regierungsrat
  - Max Pfister, Schultheiss 2005
  - Anton Schwingruber, Statthalter 2005
  - Markus Dürr
  - Kurt Meyer
  - Yvonne Schärli
- Parliament: Grosser Rat (2003–2007)
  - Bernardette Schaller-Kurmann, president 2005

==== Neuchâtel ====
- Executive: Conseil d'Etat
  - Bernard Soguel, Président
  - Sylvie Perrinjaquet, vice-présidente (June 1, 2005 - May 31, 2006)
  - Fernand Cuche
  - Jean Studer
  - Roland Debély
- Parliament: Grand Conseil (2001–2005)
  - Christian Blandenier, president

==== Nidwalden ====
- Executive: Regierungsrat (July 1, 2002 - June 30, 2006)
  - Gerhard Odermatt, Landammann (July 1, 2004 - June 30, 2005)
  - Lisbeth Gabriel, Landesstatthalterin
  - Paul Niederberger
  - Beat Fuchs
  - Beatrice Jann
  - Leo Odermatt
  - vacancy
- Parliament: Landrat
  - Peter Steiner, president

==== Obwalden ====
- Executive: Regierungsrat
  - Elisabeth Gander-Hofer, Landammann 2004/2005
  - Hans Matter, Landstatthalter 2004/2005
  - Niklaus Bleiker
  - Hans Hofer
  - Hans Wallimann
- Parliament: Kantonsrat (2002–2006)
  - Beat Spichtig, president 2004/2005

==== Schaffhausen ====
- Executive: Regierungsrat
  - Heinz Albicker, Regierungspräsident 2005
  - Hans-Peter Lenherr, Vizepräsident 2005
  - Ursula Hafner-Wipf
  - Erhard Meister
  - Rosmarie Widmer Gysel
- Parliament: Grosser Rat (January 1, 2005 - December 31, 2008)
  - (convenes on January 10, 2005)

==== Schwyz ====
- Executive: Regierungsrat (July 1, 2004 - June 30, 2008)
  - Kurt Zibung, Landammann 2004-2006
  - Alois Christen, Landesstatthalter
  - Lorenz Bösch
  - Georg Hess
  - Armin Hüppin
  - Peter Reuteler
  - Walter Stählin
- Parliament: Kantonsrat
  - Michel Martin, president

=== SO, SG, TG, TI, UR, VS, VD, ZG, ZH ===
==== Solothurn ====
- Executive: Regierungsrat (2001–2005)
  - Walter Straumann, Landamman 2005
  - Rolf Ritschard, Vize-Landammann 2005
  - Ruth Gisi
  - Christian Wanner
  - Roberto Zanetti
- Parliament: Kantonsrat (2001–2005)
  - Ruedi Lehmann, president 2005

==== St. Gallen ====
- Executive: Regierung (June 1, 2004 – May 31, 2008)
  - Josef Keller, Regierungspräsident
  - Willi Haag
  - Heidi Hanselmann
  - Kathrin Hilber
  - Karin Keller-Sutter
  - Peter Schönenberger
  - Hans Ulrich Stöckling
- Parliament: Kantonsrat
  - Margrit Stadler-Egli, Kantonsratspräsidentin 2004/2005

==== Thurgau ====
- Executive: Regierungsrat
  - Claudius Graf-Schelling, Präsident 2004/2005
  - Roland Eberle, Vizepräsident
  - Bernhard Koch
  - Hans Peter Ruprecht
  - Kaspar Schläpfer
- Parliament: Grosser Rat
  - Richard Peter, president 2004/2005

==== Ticino ====
- Executive: Consiglio di Stato (2007–2011)
  - Gabriele Gendotti,
  - Laura Sadis,
  - Marco Borradori Vicepresidente
  - Luigi Pedrazzini
  - Patrizia Pesenti Presidente (April 2007/2008)
- Parliament: Gran Consiglio (2007–2011)
  - Monica Duca Widmer, president 2007/2008

==== Uri ====
- Executive: Regierungsrat
  - Josef Arnold, Landammann
  - Markus Stadler, Landesstatthalter
  - Isidor Baumann
  - Josef Dittli
  - Stefan Fryberg
  - Heidi Z'graggen
  - Markus Züst
- Parliament: Landrat
  - Luzia Schuler-Arnold, president

==== Valais-Wallis ====
- Executive: Conseil d'Etat or Staatsrat
  - Jean-René Fournier, Président du Conseil d'Etat 2004/2005
  - Claude Roch, Vizepräsident des Staatsrates
  - Thomas Burgener
  - Jean-Jacques Rey-Bellet
  - Wilhelm Schnyder
- Parliament: Grand Conseil or Grosser Rat (2001–2005)
  - Patrice Clivaz, president 2004/2005

==== Vaud ====
- Executive: Conseil d'Etat (2003–2007)
  - Anne-Catherine Lyon, Présidente du Conseil d'Etat 2005
  - Pascal Broulis, Vice-président du Conseil d'Etat 2005
  - Pierre-Yves Maillard
  - François Marthaler
  - Jacqueline Maurer-Mayor
  - Jean-Claude Mermoud
  - Charles-Louis Rochat
- Parliament: Grand Conseil
  - Bertrand Clot, president 2004/2005

==== Zug ====
- Executive: Regierungsrat (2003–2006)
  - Brigitte Profos-Meier, Landammann 2005/2006
  - Hans-Beat Uttinger, Statthalter 2005/2006
  - Joachim Eder
  - Peter Hegglin
  - Matthias Michel
  - Walter Suter
  - Hanspeter Uster
- Parliament: Kantonsrat
  - Erwina Winiger Jutz, president 2005/2006

==== Zürich ====
- Executive: Regierungsrat (2003–2007)
  - Markus Notter
  - Rita Fuhrer
  - Regine Aeppli Präsident
  - Hans Hollenstein
  - Markus Kägi
  - Ursula Gut
  - Thomas Heiniger
- Parliament: Kantonsrat

== Mayors ==
These are the mayors of the most populous municipalities of Switzerland on January 1, 2005. The function, election system, and term of the listed office varies, as does municipal organization from one canton to another.

- Zürich: Corine Mauch, Stadtpräsident (since 2009)
- Geneva: Pierre Muller, Maire 2004/2005
- Basel: Jörg Schild, Regierungspräsident 2004
- Bern: Alexander Tschäppät, Stadtpräsident (since 2005)
- Lausanne: Daniel Brélaz, Syndic 2002-2011 (since 2002)
- Aarau: Dr. Marcel Guignard, Stadtammann (since 2001)
- Winterthur: Ernst Wohlwend, Stadtpräsident (since 2002)
- St. Gallen: Franz Hagmann, Stadtpräsident 2005-2008 (since 2005)
- Lucerne: Urs W. Studer, Stadtpräsident (since 1996)
- Lugano: Giorgio Giudici, Sindaco (since 1984)
- Biel/Bienne: Hans Stöckli, Stadtpräsident or Maire (since 1990)
- Thun: Hans-Ueli von Allmen, Stadtpräsident (since 1991)
- Köniz: Luc Mentha, Gemeindepräsident (since 2004)
- La Chaux-de-Fonds: Pierre Hainard, Président du Conseil communal 2006/2007
- Schaffhausen: Marcel Wenger, Stadtpräsident (since 1997)
- Fribourg-Freiburg: Jean Bourgknecht, Syndic (since 2004)
- Chur: Christian Boner, Stadtpräsident 2005-2008 (since 2001)
- Neuchâtel: Françoise Jeanneret, Présidente du Conseil communal 2004/2005
- Vernier: Nelly Buntschu, Maire 2004/2005
- Uster: Elisabeth Surbeck-Brugger, Stadtpräsidentin 2002-2006 (since 1998)
- Sion: François Mudry, Président

== See also ==
- 2005 in Switzerland
