= Buntschu =

Buntschu is a Swiss surname. Notable people with the surname include:

- Baptiste Buntschu (born 1990), Swiss footballer
- Nelly Buntschu (born 1947), Swiss politician
