= Starschedel =

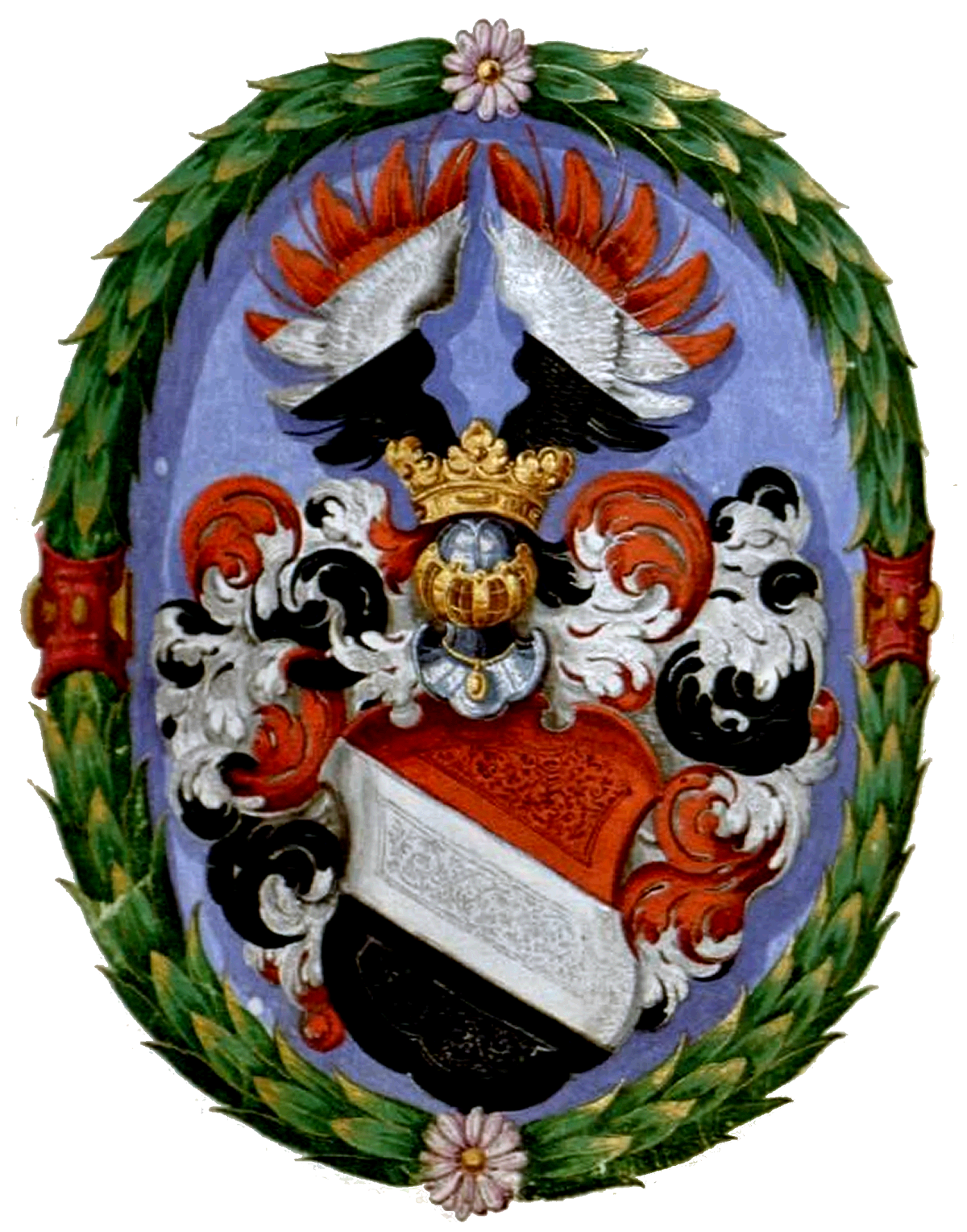
- Starschedel coat of arms
- Current region: Saxony, Northern Bohemia

The Starschedel family is an old German noble family.

== History ==
Most of the properties owned by the family of Starschedel were in Saxony. At times members ruled the North Bohemian settlement of Schluckenau. Representatives of the family were mainly in the service of the Elector of Saxony.

== List of family members ==
- Caspar von Starschedel, the owner of the manor Gotha from 1585 and businesses he was a member of the court of Emperor
- Haubold Heinrich von Starschedel (1650-1701), advisor and court gentleman at Lodersleben
- Heinrich von Starschedel, head of mining operations for Schneeberger from 1483 to 1485 at Filzteich
- Otto von Starschedel, owner of the estates Rödern and Gotha, the dominion Schluckenau and member of the Privy Council for Maurice, Landgrave of Hesse-Kassel
