= Alex Kuprecht =

Swiss politician

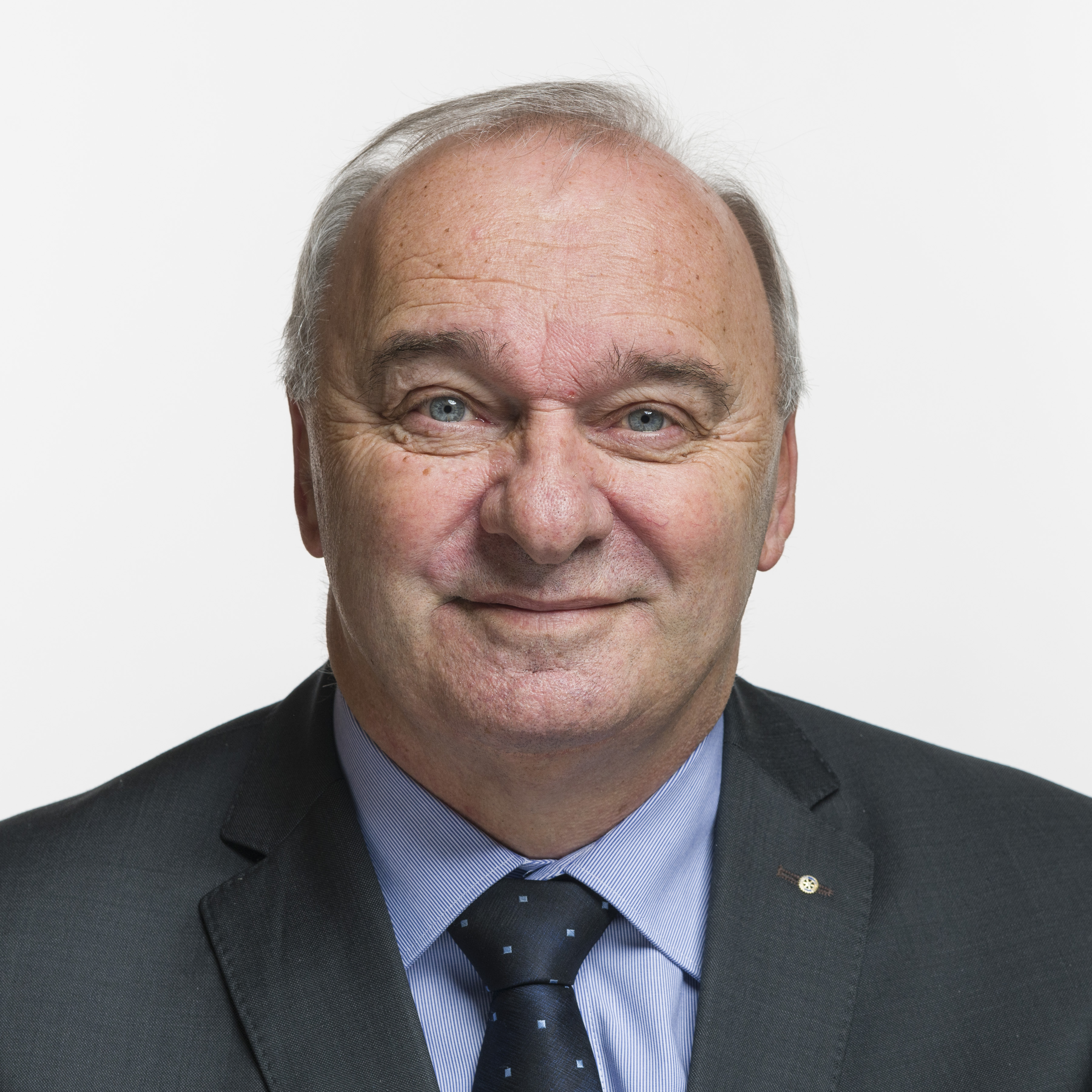

President of the Council of States
- In office 30 November 2020 – 29 November 2021
- Preceded by: Hans Stöckli
- Succeeded by: Thomas Hefti

First Vice President of the Council of States
- In office 2 December 2019 – 30 November 2020
- Preceded by: Hans Stöckli
- Succeeded by: Thomas Hefti

Member of the Council of States
- Incumbent
- Assumed office 19 October 2003
- Constituency: Schwyz

Personal details
- Born: 22 December 1957 (age 68) Richterswil, Switzerland
- Party: Swiss People's Party
- Profession: Insurance agent

Alex Kuprecht is a Swiss politician who was the President of the Council of States from 2020 to 2021. A member of the Swiss People's Party (SVP/UDC), he has served in the Council of States since 2003, representing the canton of Schwyz. For the 2019–2020 legislative term, Kuprecht was First Vice President of the Council of States under the presidency of Hans Stöckli.

== Biography ==
=== Early career ===
Kuprecht was born in the town of Richterswil, which is in the Horgen District of the canton of Zürich. He spent most of his early career in the insurance business. He was a sales agent and managed an agency in Lachen. In 2011, he was hired as a relationship manager for Basler Versicherungen, a subsidiary of the Swiss insurer Bâloise, a role that Swiss media has characterised as a lobbyist for the insurance industry.

Kuprecht was elected in 1990 to the Kantonsrat of Schwyz and served until his election to the Council of States in 2003. On the Kantonsrat, he was a member of the parliamentary group on housing and real estate as well as the parliamentary group on the textile industry.

=== Council of States ===
Since his election to the Council of States, Kuprecht has served on the State Political Committee, the Security Committee and the Commission for Social Security and Health. He was the president of the Social Security and Health Committee from 2009 to 2011 and the president of the Security Committee from 2013 to 2015. He was the president of the delegation for relations with Liechtenstein and the delegation for relations with Austria.

Since his election in 2003, Kuprecht has had little difficulty winning reelection, drawing an absolute majority in the first round of elections in 2007, 2011, 2015 and 2019. In announcing his candidacy for the 2019 federal election, Kuprecht said that it would be his last.

In 2012, Kuprecht initially won an election as one of the vice presidents of the party's parliamentary group by two votes over Natalie Rickli. After some members including Christoph Blocher, one of the party's leaders, called for a re-vote, Kuprecht stepped down and allowed for a new vote in which Rickli was elected. In the 2018–2019 session, Kuprecht was named Second Vice President of the Council of States. As with tradition, for the 2019–2020 session, he was elected as the First Vice President.

Kuprecht is part of the pro-business wing of the Swiss People's Party. In 2011, he expressed opposition to anti-immigration initiatives that others in the SVP supported. Kuprecht cited concerns that the "Masseneinwanderung stoppen" initiative could jeopardize Switzerland's treaties with the European Union. As a lobbyist for an insurance company, he has been criticized for his influence in passing health and social legislation through his committee. In 2020, Kuprecht expressed opposition to a proposal to send Swiss soldiers to Afghanistan to protect a detachment of Swiss development workers in the country.

Political offices
Preceded by Hans Stöckli	President of the Council of States; 2020–present	Succeeded by Incumbent
