= Jean-René Fournier =

Swiss politician

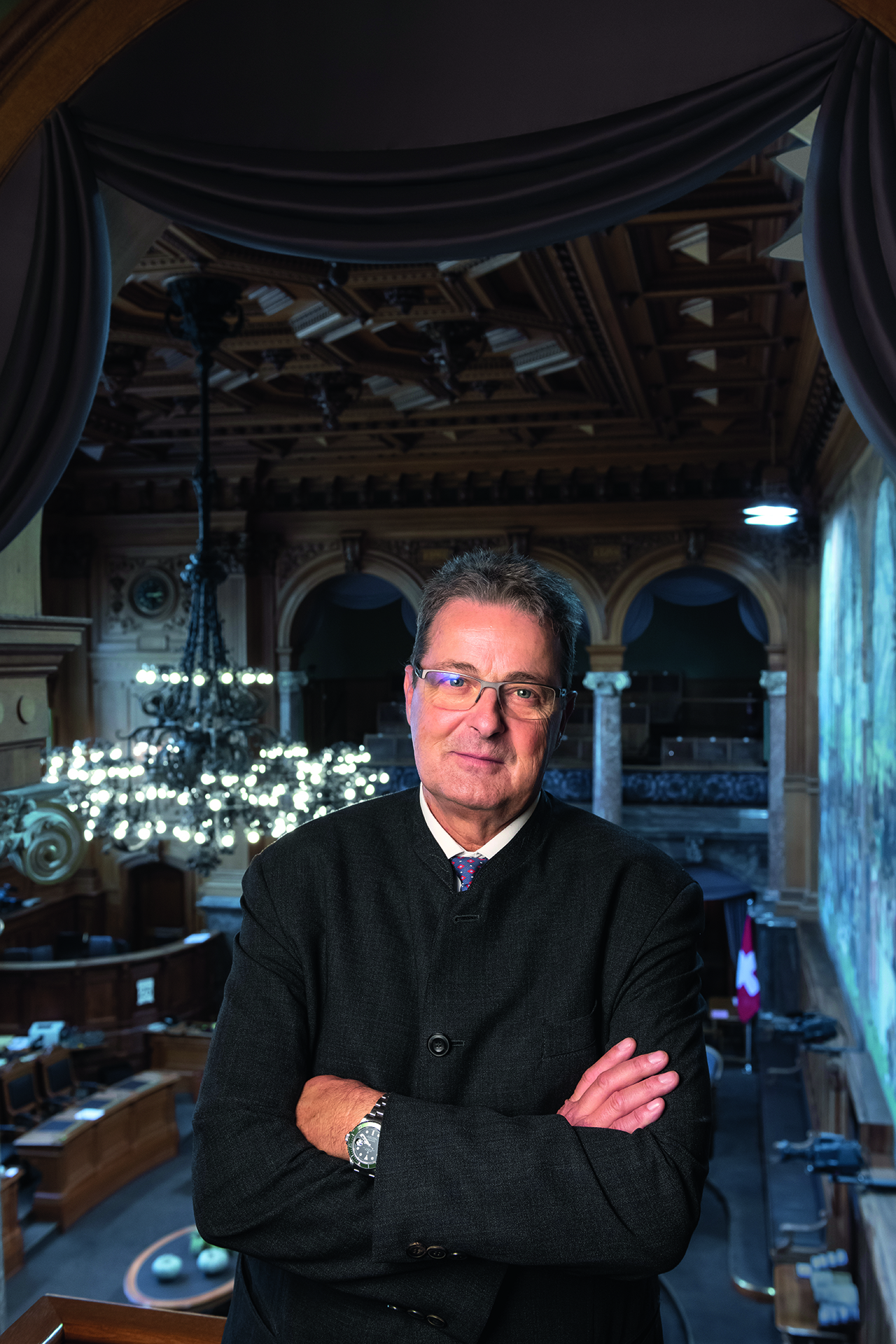

President of the Council of States
- In office 26 November 2018 – 1 December 2019
- Preceded by: Karin Keller-Sutter
- Succeeded by: Hans Stöckli

Member of the Council of States for Valais
- In office 3 December 2007 – 1 December 2019
- Preceded by: Simon Epiney
- Succeeded by: Marianne Maret

Councillor of State of Valais
- In office 1 May 1997 – 30 April 2009

Personal details
- Born: 18 December 1957 (age 67); Riddes, Switzerland
- Political party: Christian Democratic People's Party of Switzerland

Jean-René Fournier (French pronunciation: [ʒɑ̃ʁəne fuʁnje]; born 18 December 1957) is a Swiss politician. Notably, he was a member of the Council of States from 2007 to 2019, serving as the President of the Council from 2018 to 2019. Previously, he was a member of the Grand Council of Valais from 1985 to 1997 and a Councillor of State of Valais from 1997 to 2009. He was president of the cantonal executive from 2000 to 2001 and from 2004 to 2005.

Fournier was elected as the President of the Council of States for the 2018–2019 term with 44 out of 45 votes. He was the fourth Valais representative to be elected to the post.

Fournier did not run for re-election in 2019. He was succeeded by Marianne Maret.

Preceded by Karin Keller-Sutter	President of the Council of States; 2019/2020	Succeeded by Hans Stöckli
