= Ettlin =

Ettlin is a surname. Notable people with the surname include:

- Erich Ettlin (born 1962), Swiss politician
- Hans Ettlin (born 1945), Swiss gymnast
- Lukas Ettlin (born 1975), Swiss director and cinematographer
