= Isabelle Chassot =

Swiss politician (born 1965)

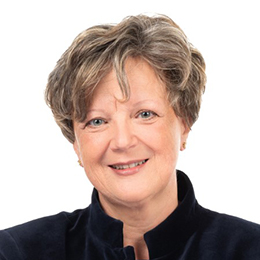

Member of the Council of States
- Incumbent
- Assumed office 29 November 2021
- Preceded by: Christian Levrat
- Constituency: Fribourg

Director of the Federal Office of Culture
- In office 1 November 2013 – 2021
- Preceded by: Jean-Frédéric Jauslin

State Councillor of the Canton of Fribourg
- In office 2002 – 31 October 2013

Personal details
- Born: March 28, 1965 (age 61) Morges, Switzerland
- Party: The Centre
- Education: University of Fribourg (Lic. iur.)
- Occupation: Politician, Lawyer

Isabelle Chassot (French: [izabɛl ʃaso]; born 28 March 1965 in Morges; registered as a resident of Siviriez) is a Swiss politician (The Centre, formerly CVP) and a member of the Council of States since 2021. She was Director of the Federal Office of Culture (FOC) from 2013 to 2021 and State Councillor of the Canton of Fribourg from 2002 to 2013.

== Biography ==
Isabelle Chassot is the daughter of an Austrian mother and a Swiss father. She grew up in Granges-Paccot and graduated from the Kollegium Heilig Kreuz in Freiburg with a Type A high school diploma in 1984. She then studied law bilingually at the University of Fribourg and was admitted to the bar in 1988. She practiced as a lawyer from 1992 to 1995.

From 1992 to 2001, she was a member of the Grand Council of the Canton of Fribourg. During the same period, she was a personal assistant to Federal Councilors Arnold Koller and Ruth Metzler-Arnold. In 2001, she was elected to the State Council. She headed the Directorate of Education, Culture and Sport (EKSD). In the 2006 elections, she was re-elected with the best result (59 percent). In 2007, she was President of the State Council. From 2006 to 2013, Chassot was President of the Swiss Conference of Cantonal Ministers of Education.

In May 2013, she was appointed by the Federal Council as the new Director of the Federal Office of Culture (FOC) effective 1 November 2013, succeeding Jean-Frédéric Jauslin. As a result, she resigned from the State Council of the Canton of Fribourg at the end of October 2013. She remained Director of the FOC until 2021.

In 2021, she was elected to the Council of States for the Canton of Fribourg, succeeding Christian Levrat (SP). As of April 2024, she is a member of the Foreign Policy Committee, the Science, Education and Culture Committee, the Legal Affairs Committee, and the Delegation to the Inter-Parliamentary Union.

She was re-elected in the second round of the 2023 Swiss federal election.

In 2023, she was elected by the offices of both councils as president of the parliamentary inquiry commission "Management of the authorities – CS emergency merger".

Chassot lives in Granges-Paccot.

== Literature ==
- Georges Andrey, John Clerc, Jean-Pierre Dorand et Nicolas Gex: Der Freiburger Staatsrat: 1848–2011. Geschichte, Organisation, Mitglieder. Editions La Sarine, Freiburg im Üechtland 2012, ISBN 978-2-88355-153-4.

== See also ==
- List of members of the Swiss Council of States (2019–2023)
- List of members of the Swiss Council of States (2023–2027)
