= Schneeberger =

Schneeberger is a surname. Notable people with the surname include:

- Daniela Schneeberger (born 1967), Swiss politician
- Florian Schneeberger (1971–2026), Austrian sailor
- Hansheinz Schneeberger (1926–2019), Swiss violinist
- John Schneeberger (born 1961), Canadian physician
- Josef Schneeberger (1919–1989), Austrian cross country skier
- Marc Schneeberger (born 1981), Swiss sprinter
- Markus Schneeberger (born 1969), Austrian sailor
- Rosina Schneeberger (born 1994), Austrian skier
- Sébastien Schneeberger (born 1973), Swiss-Canadian politician
- Thomas Schneeberger (born 1956), American handball and basketball player

== See also ==
- Schneeberg, Saxony
