= Johanna Gapany =

Swiss politician (born 1988)

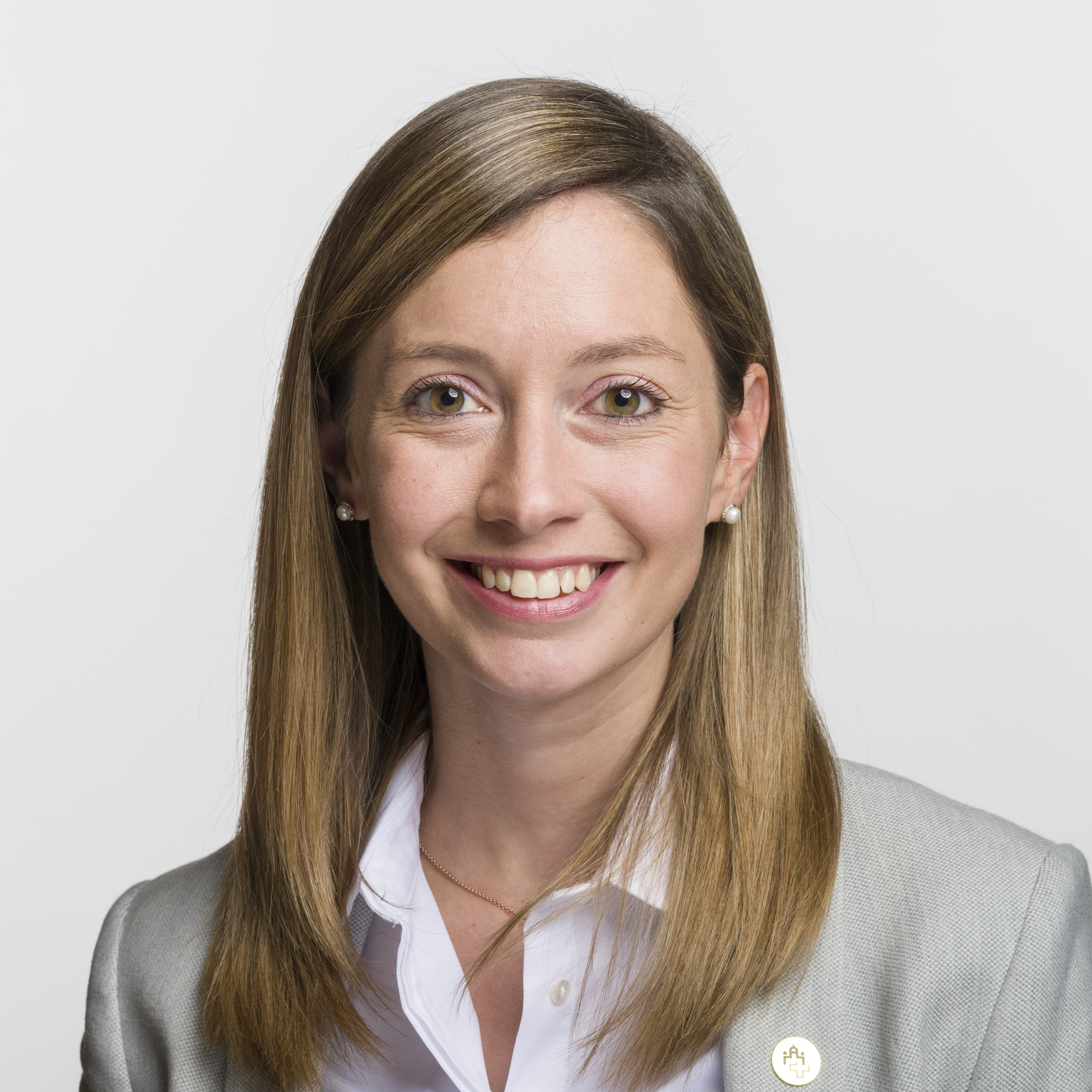

Member of the Council of States
- Incumbent
- Assumed office 2 December 2019

Personal details
- Born: 25 July 1988 (age 38) Riaz, Fribourg, Switzerland

Johanna Gapany (born 25 July 1988) is a Swiss politician of the FDP. The Liberals and a current member of the Council of States in Switzerland.

== Early years and education ==
She was born into a liberal family from Gruyères. Her father was a farmer and a member of the FDP as well as the municipal council of La Tour de Trème. She studied economic sciences at the School of Management Fribourg from which she graduated in 2011. Following her graduation she became a project manager at the Daler Hospital.

== Political career ==
She began to become involved in politics as she was opposed to the fusion of her district La Tour de Trème with Bulle in 2006. The political campaign failed, but she stayed in politics. After having taken part in political discussions in youth movements of both the Swiss People's Party (SVP) and the Christian Democratic People's Party (CVP) she joined the youth wing of the FDP. In 2010 she became the leader of the youth wing of the FDP for which she stood as a candidate for the National Council in 2011. Between 2016 and 2019 she was a member of the Municipal council of Bulle and the Grand Council of Fribourg. She was elected into the Council of States in the Federal Elections in November 2019 as the youngest woman in Switzerland and the first one from the Canton of Fribourg. She won by a small margin of 138 votes and replaced Beat Vonlanthen from the Christian Democratic People's Party (CVP).

== Political views ==
She advocates for a paternal leave and an equal access to pension for men and women.

== Personal life ==
She is married and has a child. She is also a member of FC Helvetia, the female football club of the Swiss Parliament.
