= Philippe Bauer =

Swiss politician

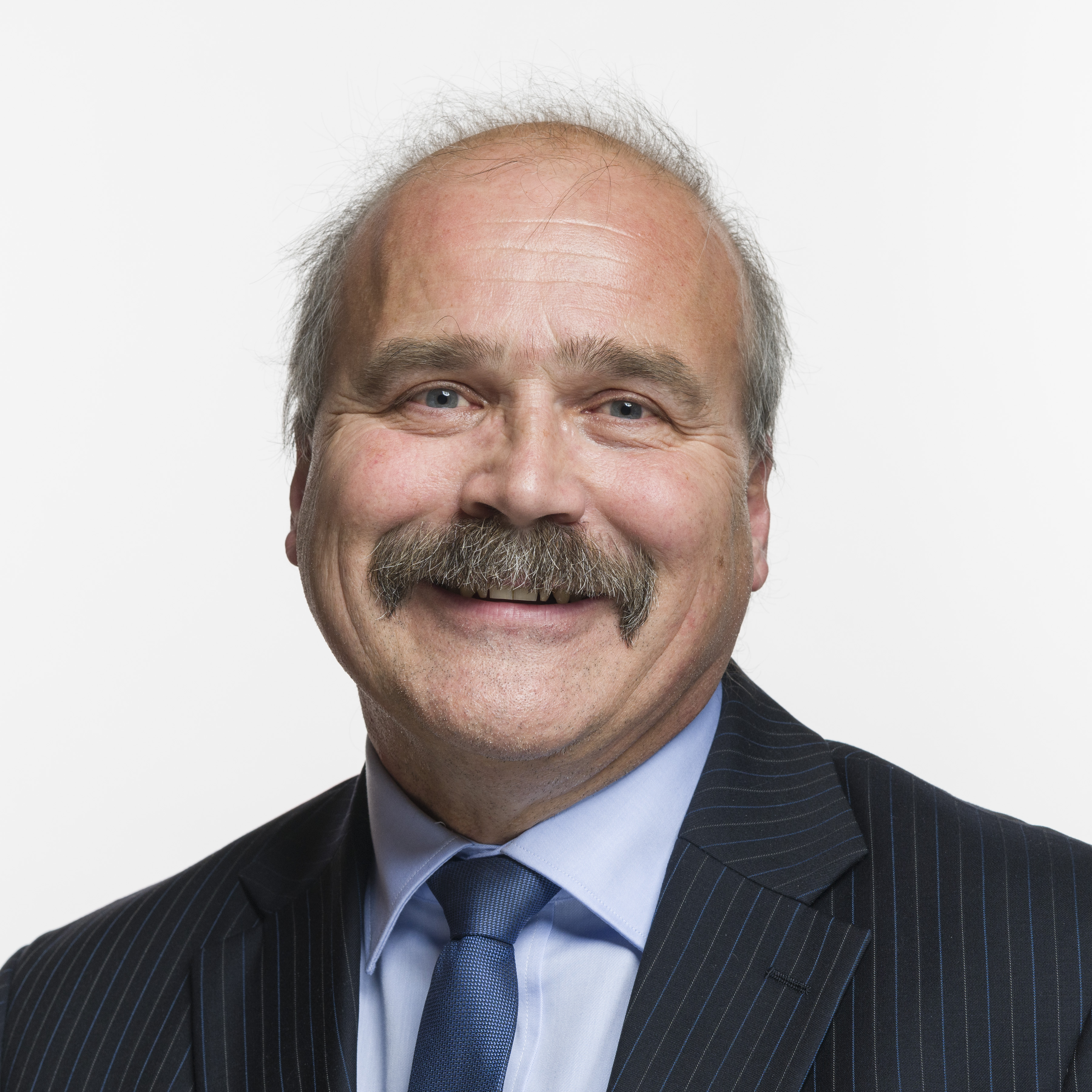

Member of the Council of States of Switzerland
- Constituency: Neuchâtel
- Incumbent
- Assumed office 2 December 2019

Member of the National Council of Switzerland
- In office 30 November 2015 – 1 December 2019

Personal details
- Born: April 9, 1962 (age 64) Neuchâtel
- Party: The Liberals

Philippe Bauer is a Swiss politician who is a member of the Council of States of Switzerland.

== Biography ==
He worked as a lawyer before his election in 2019.
