= Giorgio Giudici =

Swiss politician

Giorgio Giudici (born 29 May 1945) is a Swiss architect and politician. He was mayor of Lugano from 1984 to 2013. His political party is the Partito liberale radicale svizzero.
