= Marco Borradori =

Swiss lawyer and politician (1959–2021)

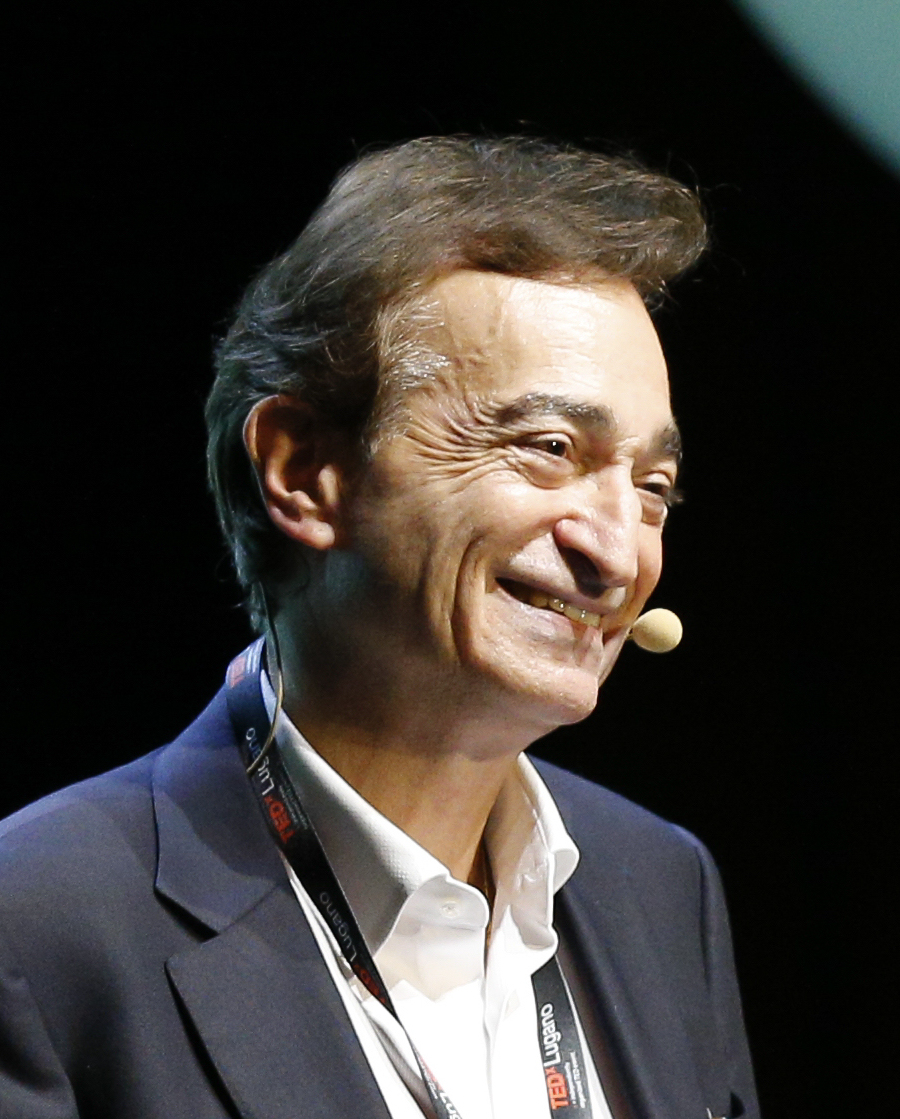
Marco Borradori

Marco Borradori (6 June 1959 – 11 August 2021) was a Swiss lawyer and politician from Sorengo, near Lugano in the canton of Ticino.

From 2013 until his death in 2021, he was the mayor of Lugano. He previously served in the National Council of Switzerland from 25 November 1991 to 11 April 1995. His political party was the Lega dei Ticinesi (Ticino League). He graduated in law from the University of Zurich in 1983.
