= Daniel Fässler =

Swiss politician

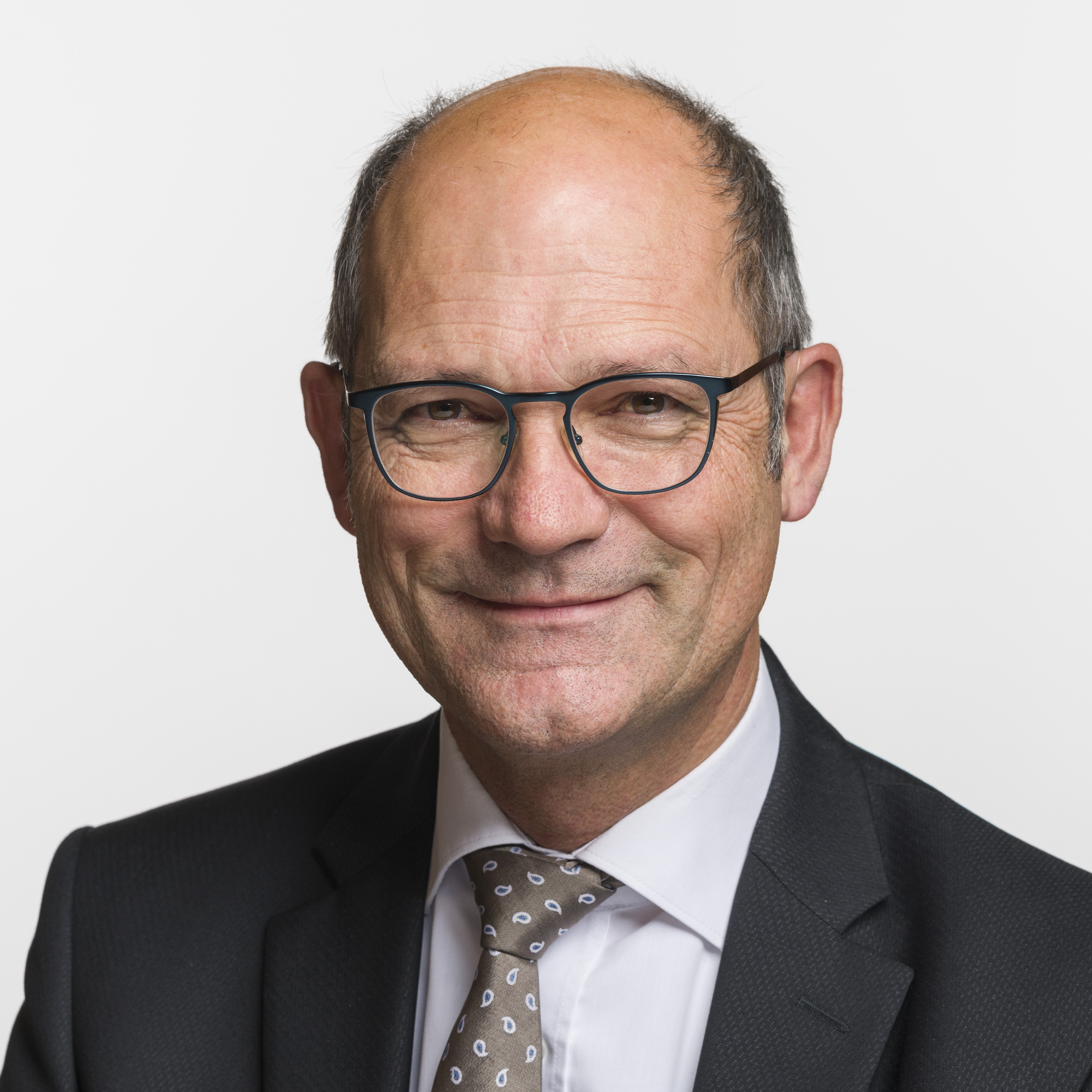
- in 2019

Member of the Council of States of Switzerland
- Incumbent
- Assumed office 3 June 2019
- Constituency: Appenzell Innerrhoden

Member of the National Council of Switzerland
- In office 15 December 2011 – 2 June 2019

Personal details
- Born: August 22, 1960 (age 65) Appenzell
- Party: The Centre
- Children: 3

Daniel Fässler is a Swiss politician who is a member of the Council of States of Switzerland.

== Biography ==
He graduated from Bern University. He was a member of the National Council from 2011 to 2019.
