= Baptiste Buntschu =

Swiss footballer (born 1990)

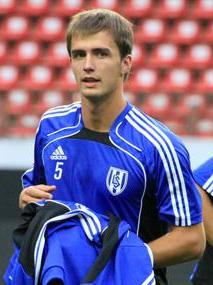

Personal information
- Date of birth: 26 February 1990 (age 36)
- Place of birth: Switzerland
- Height: 1.84 m (6 ft 0 in)
- Position: Defender

Team information
- Current team: VfL Halle 96

Youth career
- 2006–2008: Lausanne-Sport

Senior career*
Years	Team	Apps	(Gls)
2008–2012	Lausanne-Sport	40	(0)
2011	→ Nyon (loan)	4	(0)
2012	→ Delémont (loan)	13	(0)
2012–2013	Fribourg	18	(0)
2013–2014	Brandenburger SC Süd	6	(0)
2014–	VfL Halle 96		

International career^{‡}
2006	Switzerland U17	1	(0)
2008	Switzerland U19	1	(0)
- * Club domestic league appearances and goals as of 21 January 2014 ‡ National team caps and goals as of 9 April 2013

Baptiste Buntschu (born 26 February 1990) is a Swiss professional footballer currently playing for VfL Halle 96.
