= Thomas Hefti =

Swiss politician

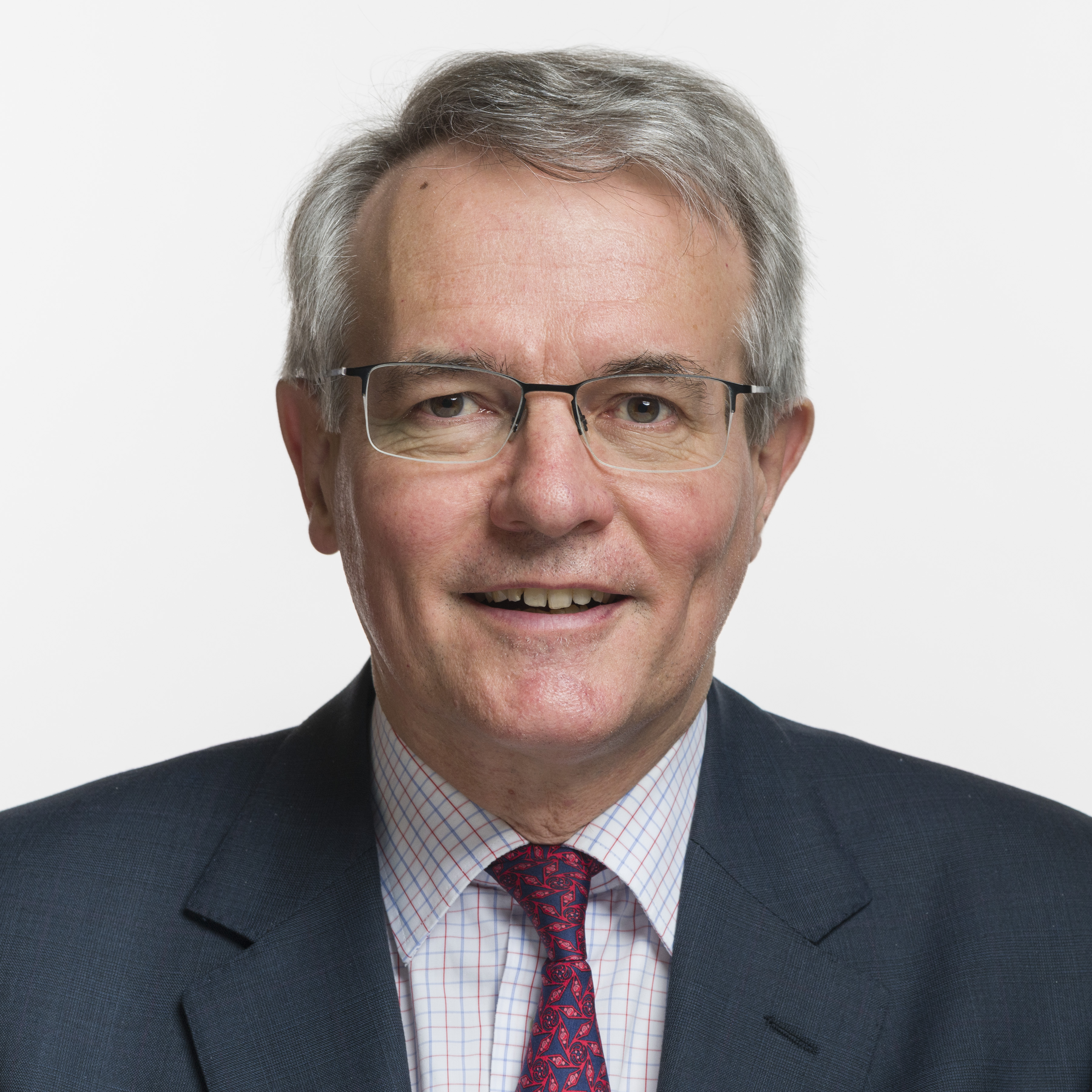
Thomas Hefti Portrait

Thomas Hefti (born 1959) is a Swiss politician who served as President of the Swiss Council of States from 2021 to 2022 and a Member of the Swiss Council of States from 2014.
