= Beat Rieder =

Swiss politician

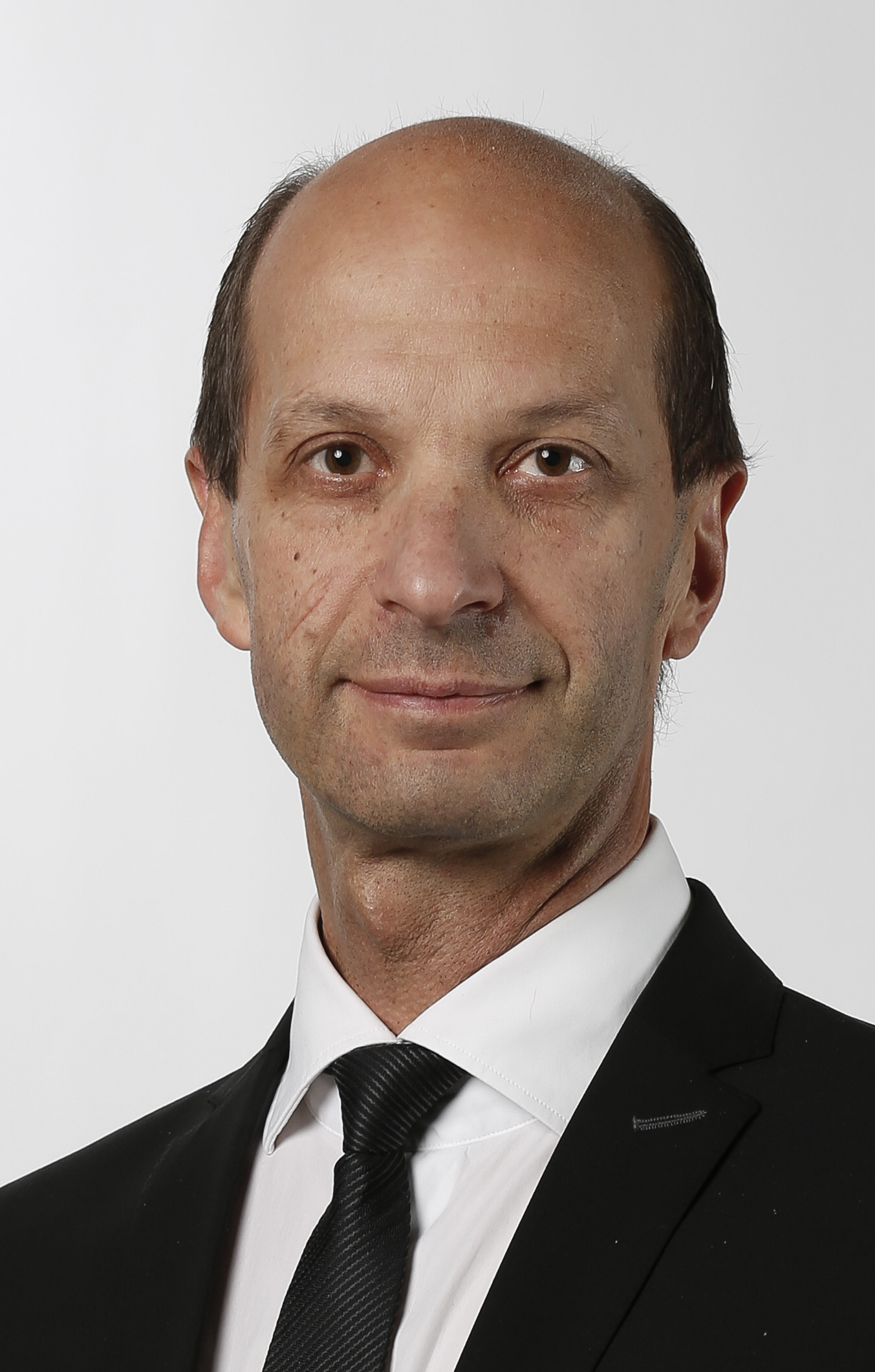

Member of the Council of States of Switzerland
- Incumbent
- Assumed office 11 November 2015
- Constituency: Valais

Personal details
- Born: February 12, 1963 (age 63) Wiler, Valais, Switzerland
- Party: Christian Democratic People's Party
- Children: 3
- Website: http://www.beat-rieder.ch/

Beat Rieder is a Swiss politician who is a member of the Council of States of Switzerland.

== Biography ==
Rieder works as a solicitor and notary in a law firm he co-manages in Brig. He was a member of the Grand Council of the Canton of Valais, faction president of the CVP Upper Valais and president of the Lötschental Valley Council.

In 2020, he was elected to the Verwaltungsrat (board of directors) of Grimselbahn AG.

In the Swiss federal election on 18 October 2015, he was elected as a member of the Ständerat (Council of States). He was re-elected in 2019 and in 2023.
