= List of mayors of Lugano =

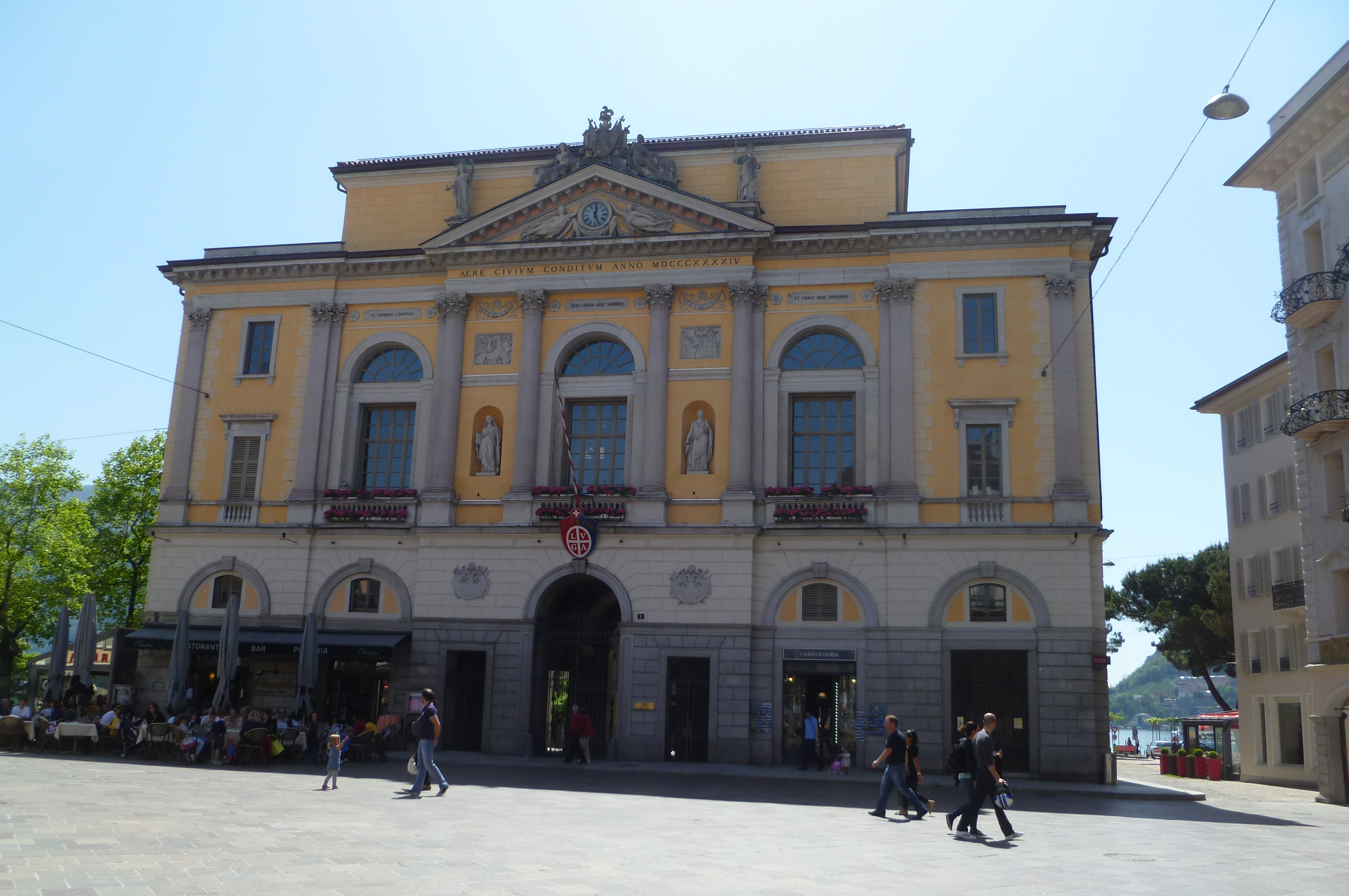
Palazzo civico of Lugano

Coat of arms of Lugano

This is a list of mayors of Lugano, Ticino, Switzerland. The mayor of the city of Lugano (sindaco di Lugano) chairs the municipal council (municipio).

Mayor (sindaco) of Lugano
Term	Mayor	Lifespan	Party	Notes
1803–1813	Francesco Capra	(1762–1819)		
1813–1818	Gaetano Moroni Stampa			
1818–1821	Giovanni B. Riva			
1821–1827	Stefano Riva	(1785–1847)		
1827–1830	Bernardo Vanoni			
1830–1862	Giacomo Luvini Perseghini			
1862–1876	Carlo Frasca			
1876–1878	Giuseppe Bernasconi			
1878–1888	Carlo Battaglini			
1888–1899	Gerolamo Vegezzi			
1899–1900	Elvezio Battaglini			
1900–1904	Antonio Fusoni			
1904–1910	Elvezio Battaglini			
1910–1919	Emilio Rava			
1919–1920	Carlo Censi			
1920–1932	Aldo Veladini			
1932–1944	Alberto De Filippis	(1897–1948)		
1944–1948	Giuseppe Lonati			
1948–1968	Paride Pelli	(1910–1968)	PLR	
1968–1984	Ferruccio Pelli	(1916–1995)	PLR	
1984–2013	Giorgio Giudici	(born 1945)	PLR	
2013–2021	Marco Borradori	(1959–2021)	Lega dei Ticinesi	
202-	Michele Foletti	(born 1966)	Lega dei ticinesi	
