= Andrea Gmür-Schönenberger =

Swiss politician

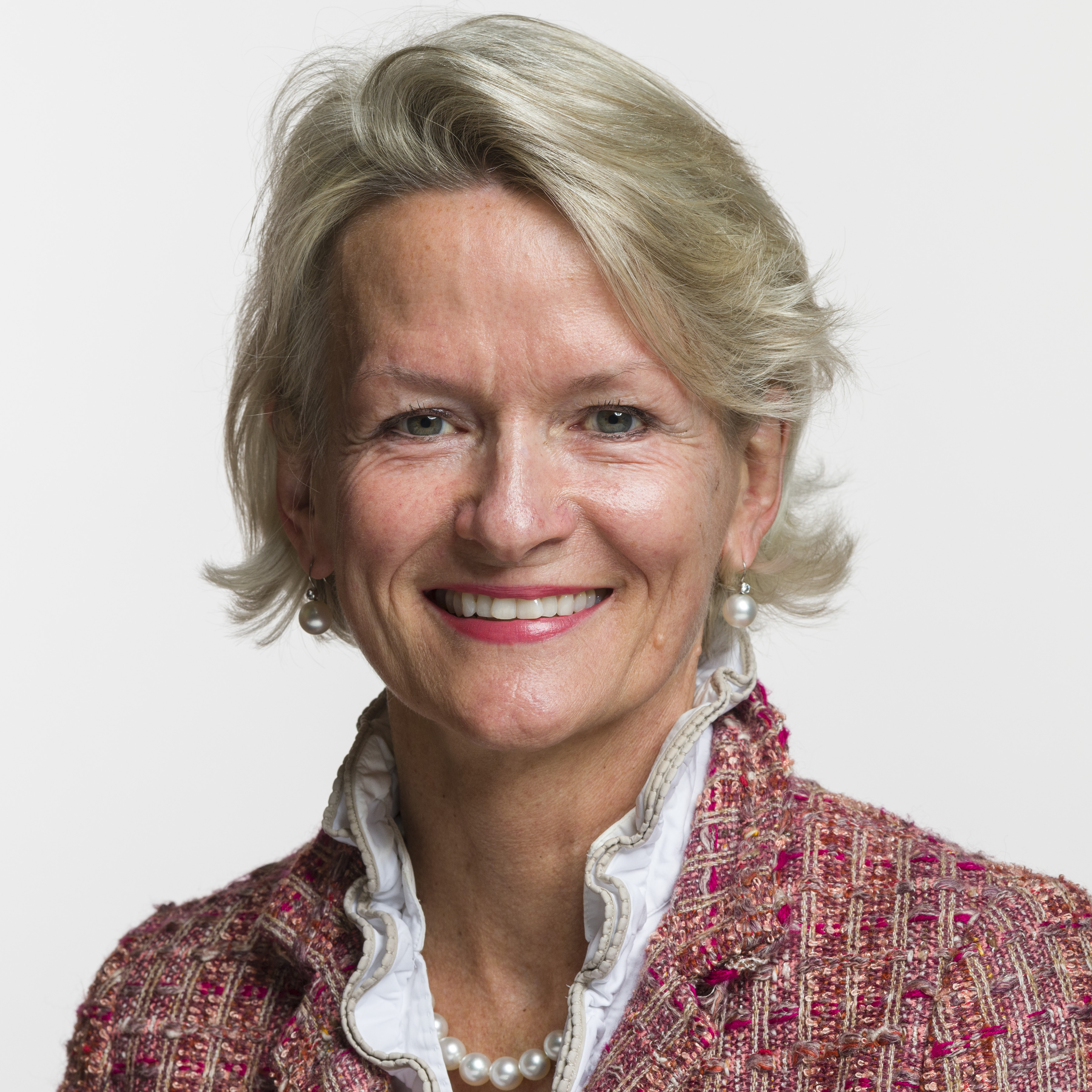
Andrea Gmür-Schönenberger in 2019.

Andrea Gmür-Schönenberger (born 18 July 1964) is a Swiss politician from The Centre, formerly of the Christian Democratic People's Party of Switzerland.

== See also ==
- List of members of the Swiss Council of States (2019–2023)
