= Céline Vara =

Swiss politician (born 1984)

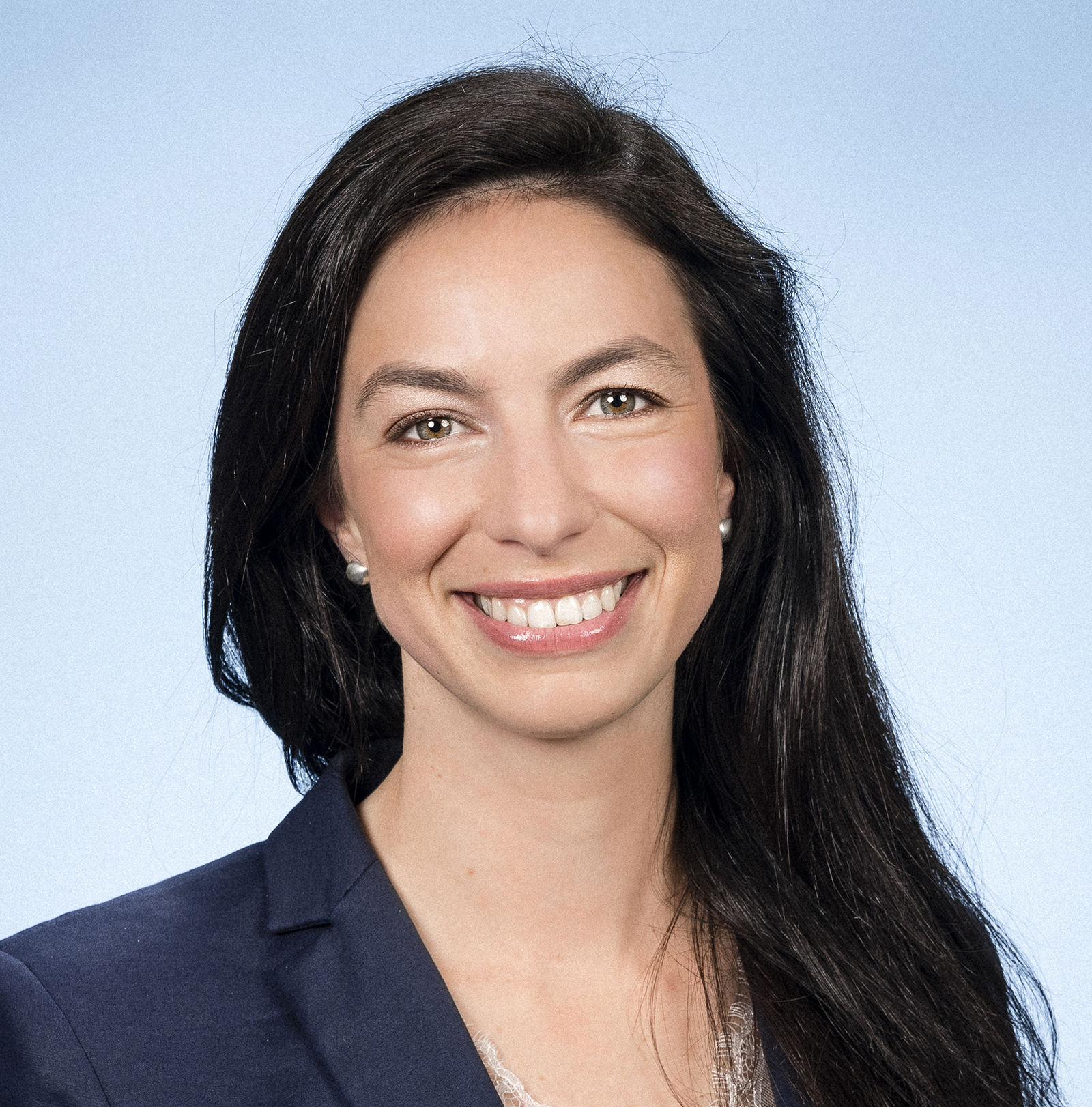

Member of the Council of States of Switzerland
- Incumbent
- Assumed office December 2019

Member of the Grand Council of Neuchâtel
- In office 2017–2019

Personal details
- Born: Céline Vara; 4 October 1984 (age 42) Saint-Aubin-Sauges, Switzerland
- Party: Green Party of Switzerland
- Education: University of Neuchâtel
- Occupation: Lawyer and politician

Céline Vara (born 4 October 1984) is a Swiss-Italian lawyer and politician of the Green Party of Switzerland (GPS). She is currently a member of the Council of States of Switzerland.

== Early life and education ==
Céline Vara was born to a florist from Neuchâtel and a Sicilian immigrant. In her youth, while studying at the Gymnasium, she took part in a beauty contest at a local Wine festival during which she was elected the "Miss Fête des Vendanges" in 2001. She studied law at the University of Neuchâtel with a specialization in health and biotechnology law. Céline Vara obtained her lawyer license in September 2011 following which she began working as an independent lawyer in Neuchâtel. On 1 January 2017, she became a partner at Nicati, Vara and Bigger.

== Political career ==
Her political career began shortly ahead of the referendum on the adaption of the law concerning the abortion, just before she became eighteen years old. She joined the Grand Council of Neuchâtel in 2017 and became one of six Vice Presidents of the GPS on the 5 May 2018. She was elected to the Council of States of Switzerland in the parliamentarian elections of October 2019. She assumed her post on the 2 December 2019 and took a seat in the commissions focusing on foreign policy and law. Following her election to the Council of States, she resigned from the Grand Council of Neuchâtel.

== Personal life ==
She resides in Cressier, Neuchâtel and has a daughter with her partner. She holds both Swiss and Italian nationality.
