= School of Management Fribourg =

School in Switzerland

- Haute école de gestion Fribourg (HEG-FR), Hochschule für Wirtschaft Freiburg (HSW-FR)
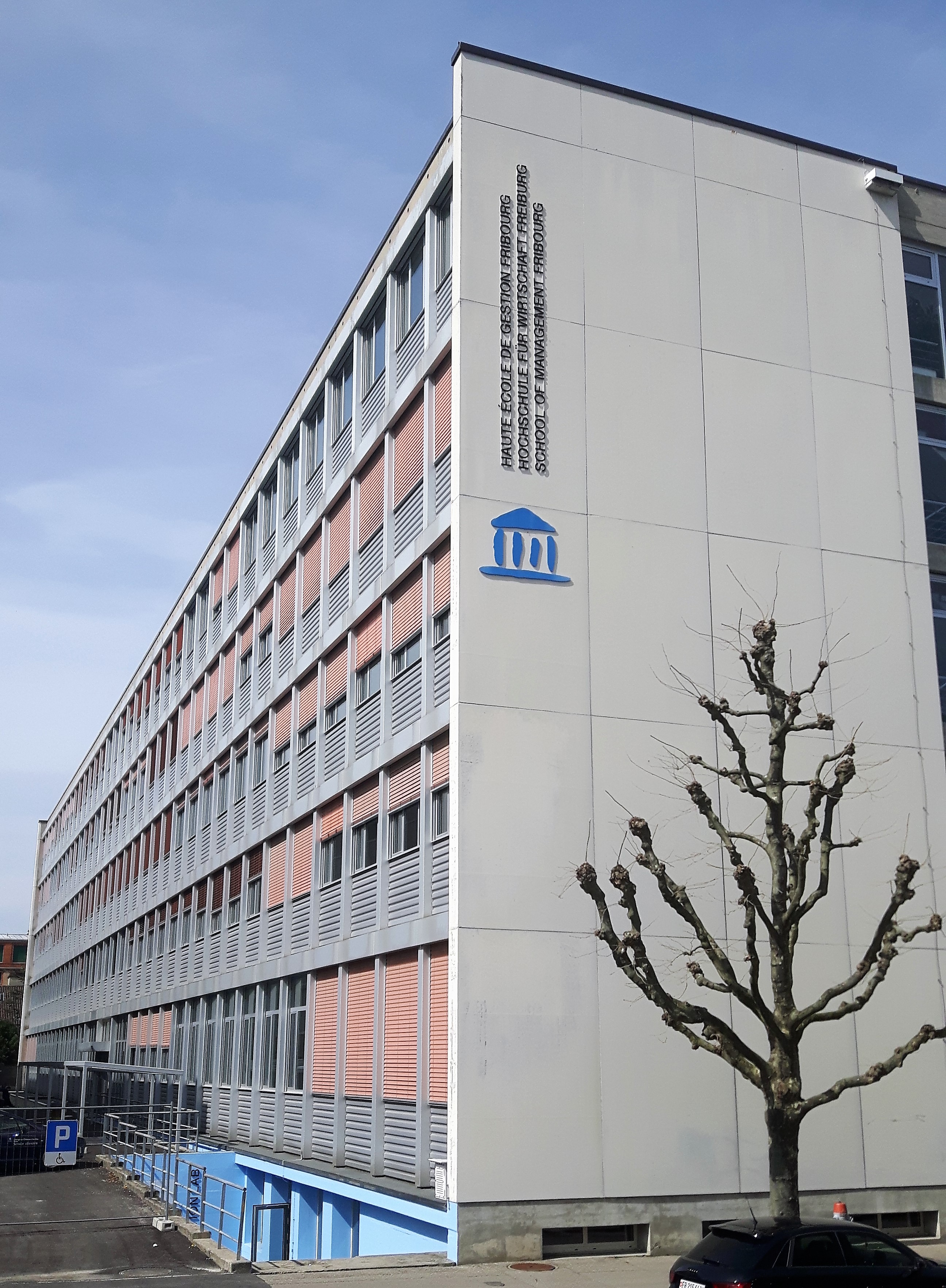
- Picture of the School of Management Fribourg taken from the south, resp. west side of the building
- Former names: School of Economics and Administration (ESCEA)
- Type: Public
- Established: 1991
- Parent institution: University of Applied Sciences Western Switzerland (HES-SO)
- Rector: Pascal Wild
- Academic staff: 100
- Students: 650
- Location: Fribourg, Fribourg, 1700, Switzerland; 46.7936°N 7.1572°E
- Campus: Pérolles
- Language: English; French; German
- Website: www.heg-fr.ch/EN/

The School of Management Fribourg (French: Haute école de gestion Fribourg; German: Hochschule für Wirtschaft Freiburg) is a public higher education institution that was created in 1991 as the School of Economics and Administration (ESCEA) and is attached to the University of Applied Sciences and Arts of Western Switzerland (HES-SO).

It offers full and/or part-time courses, leading to Bachelor, Master or further postgraduate qualifications and is structured along three departments: the Institute of Entrepreneurship and SME, the Institute of Finance, and the Institute of Social and Public Innovation. The school is located on the Pérolles campus in Fribourg, Switzerland.

The school adopts a trilingual approach (French, German and English) to education as well as research and keeps close ties to partner universities around the globe, such as Swinburne University of Technology, Worcester Polytechnic Institute (WPI), University of Lorraine, University of Montpellier, Grenoble School of Management, EGADE Business School Monterrey, Université de Montréal, Université du Québec, University of Vermont, and the University of Trier among others.

Spanning the activities of its Institute of Finance as well as the Institute of Entrepreneurship and SME, the school is engaged in research as well as education and consulting activities in the field of Fintech jointly with the Fintech Circle from London.

The School of Management Fribourg offers the following study courses on bachelor and master level:

- Bachelor of Science HES-SO in Business administration
- Master of Science HES-SO in Business administration, Major in Entrepreneurship (Innovation and Growth)
- Executive Master in Business administration HES-SO (MBA)

It furthermore offers study courses leading to a Certificate of Advanced Study (CAS) on the following subjects

- CAS – Business administration
- CAS – Project management
- CAS – Supply chain
- CAS – Corporate communication
- CAS – Public administration
- CAS - Management of Social Economy Enterprises
- CAS - Management of Sustainable Development
