= Benedikt Würth =

Swiss politician

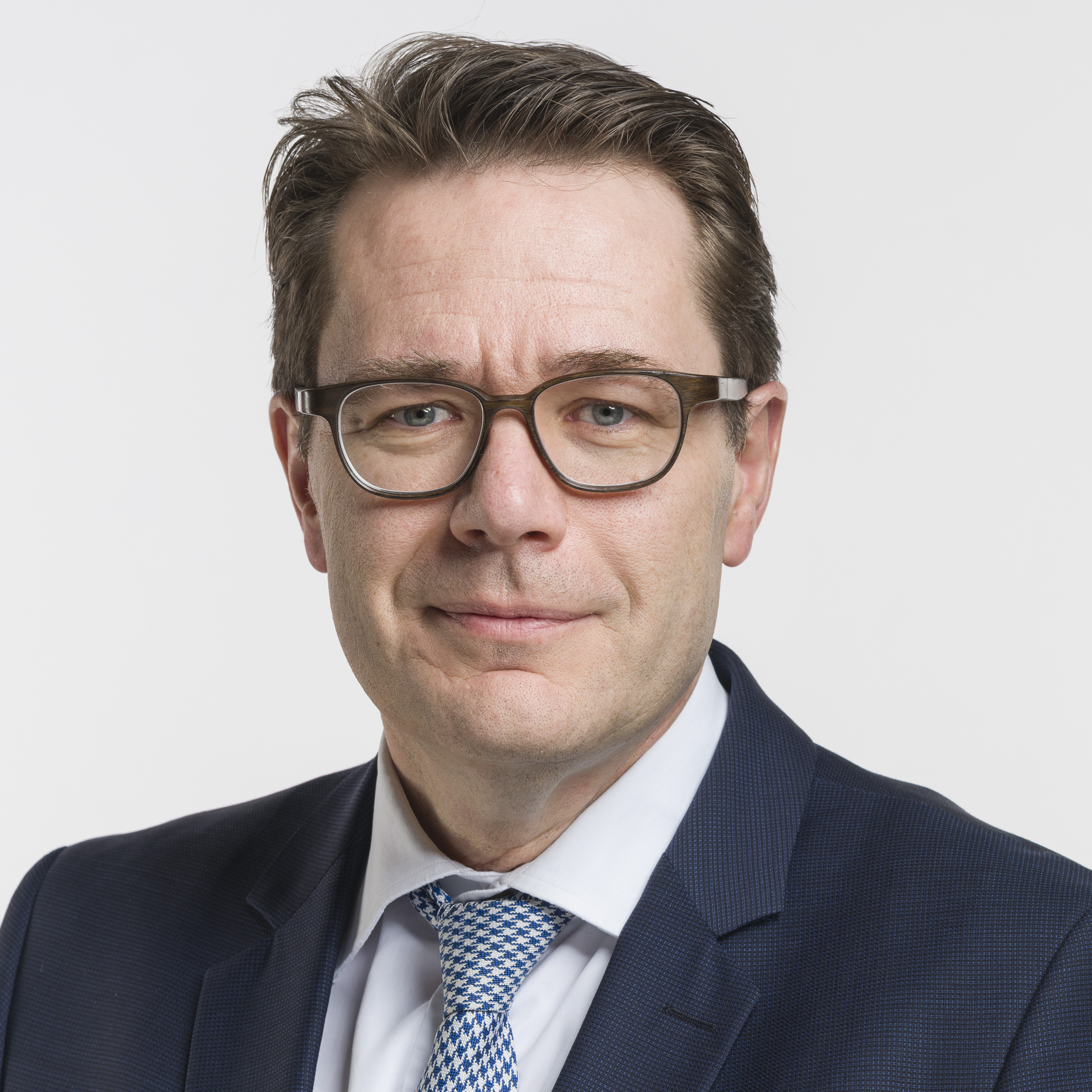

Member of the Council of States of Switzerland
- Incumbent
- Assumed office 3 June 2019

Personal details
- Born: January 20, 1968 (age 58) St. Gallen, Switzerland

Benedikt Würth is a Swiss politician who is a member of the Council of States of Switzerland.

== Biography ==
He was elected in 2019.
