= Hans Stöckli =

Swiss politician

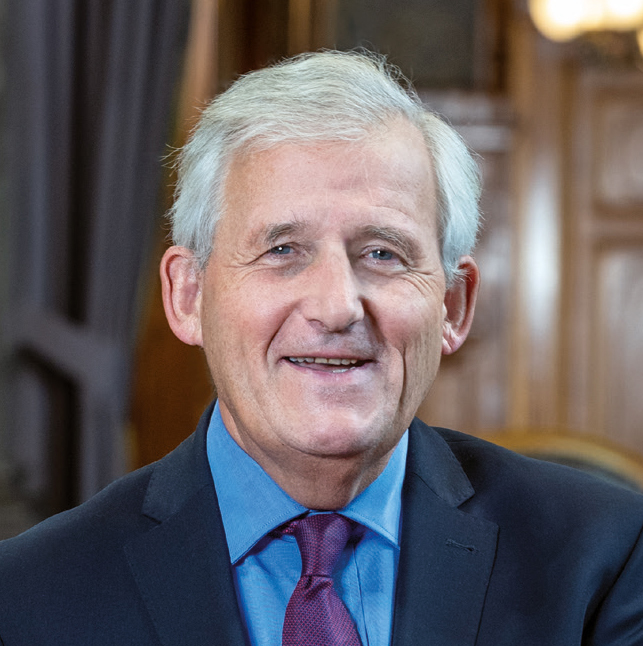

President of the Council of States
- In office 2 December 2019 – 30 November 2020
- Preceded by: Jean-René Fournier
- Succeeded by: Alex Kuprecht

First Vice President of the Council of States
- In office 26 November 2018 – 2 December 2019
- Preceded by: Jean-René Fournier
- Succeeded by: Alex Kuprecht

Member of the Council of States
- Incumbent
- Assumed office 5 December 2011
- Constituency: Bern

Member of the National Council
- In office 20 September 2004 – 4 December 2011
- Constituency: Bern

Personal details
- Born: 12 April 1952 (age 72); Wattenwil, Switzerland
- Political party: Social Democratic Party
- Awards: World No Tobacco Day Award (2022)

Hans Stöckli (born 12 April 1952) is a Swiss politician who served as President of the Council of States from 2019 to 2020. A member of the Social Democratic Party (SP/PS), he was first elected to the Council of States for the canton of Bern in 2011. Stöckli was previously elected to the mayorship of Biel (1990–2010), Grand Council of Bern (2002–2004) and National Council (2004–2011).

== Biography ==
=== Early career ===
Stöckli entered politics in 1979 winning election to the City Council of Biel. In 1990, he became mayor of the commune. In 2002, he moved to the Grand Council of Bern; two years later, he was elected to the National Council to replace Rudolf Strahm, who had been appointed as the Swiss price regulator.

=== Swiss Federal Assembly ===
He was reelected in 2007 and then won election to the Council of States in 2011, succeeding Adrian Amstutz. He had written an essay in 1971 calling for the abolition of the body, which he said had grown stale at the time. In 2018, he was elected as First Vice President of the Council of States, which gave him the upper hand in the 2019 election for the presidency. He was indeed elected on 2 December 2019 with 49 out of 51 votes as President of the Council of States alongside Alex Kuprecht as First Vice President. Kuprecht succeeded him the next year.

From 2018, he chairs the committee of the federal popular initiative "Yes to protecting children and young adults from tobacco advertising", which was accepted in the federal vote on 13 February 2022. In 2022, the World Health Organization awarded him a World No Tobacco Day Award.

=== Personal life ===
Stöckli speaks all four official languages of Switzerland. He is married to Katharina Stöckli, a teacher.

Political offices
Preceded by Jean-René Fournier	President of the Council of States; 2019–2020	Succeeded by Alex Kuprecht
