= Mathias Zopfi =

Swiss politician

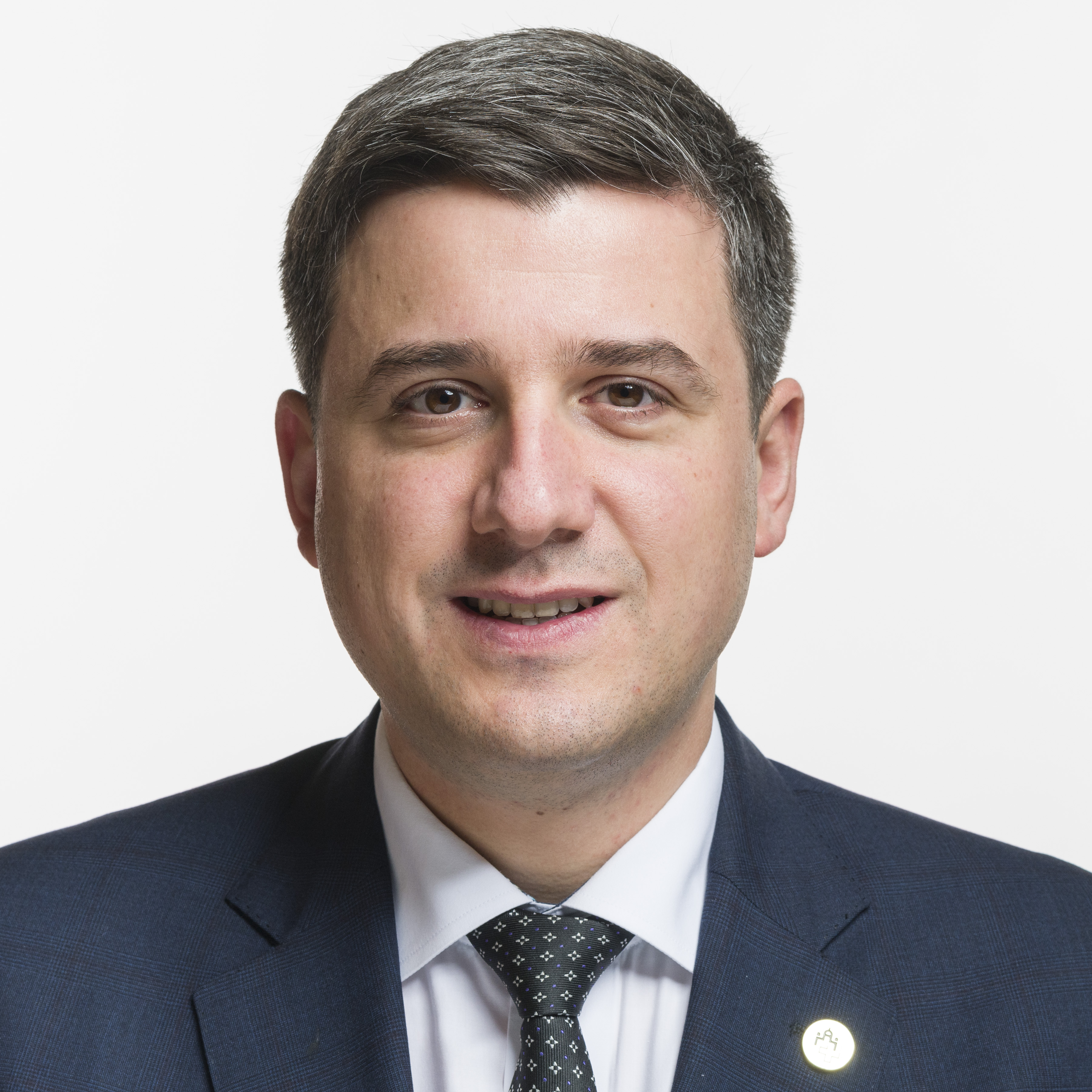

Member of the Council of States of Switzerland
- Incumbent
- Assumed office 2 December 2019

Personal details
- Born: 14 December 1983 (age 42) Glarus, Switzerland
- Party: Green Party of Switzerland
- Website: mathiaszopfi.ch

Mathias Zopfi is a Swiss politician who is a member of the Council of States (Canton of Glarus, Green Party of Switzerland).

== Biography ==
Zopfi studied law at the University of Zurich. He was admitted as a notary in the canton of Glarus in 2015. Zopfi served in the military and achieved the rank of Captain. Later, he worked for Auer Meier Zopfi AG.

== Political career ==
In the 2019 parliamentary elections, he was surprisingly elected to the Council of States for the canton of Glarus, replacing the previous mandate holder Werner Hösli (SVP). He was re-elected in 2023.
