= Matthias Michel =

Swiss politician

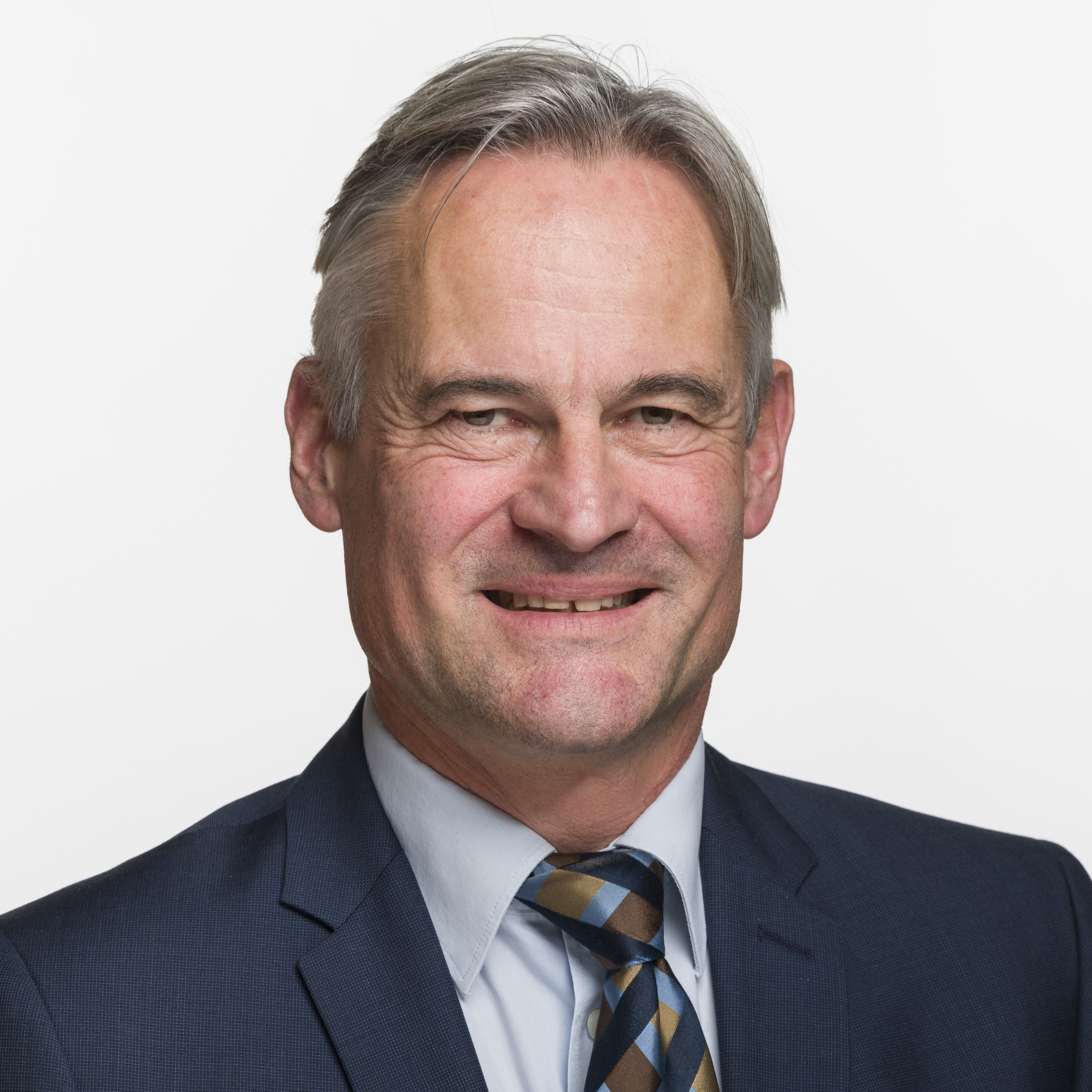
- 2019

Member of the Council of States of Switzerland
- Incumbent
- Assumed office 3 December 2019
- Constituency: Zoug

Personal details
- Born: 20 March 1963 (age 63) Thal, St. Gallen, Switzerland
- Party: The Liberals

Matthias Michel is a Swiss politician who is a member of the Council of States.

== Biography ==
Michel studied at the University of Zurich and University of Lausanne. He was registered as a lawyer in 1991. He was elected in 2019.
