= Erich Ettlin =

Swiss politician

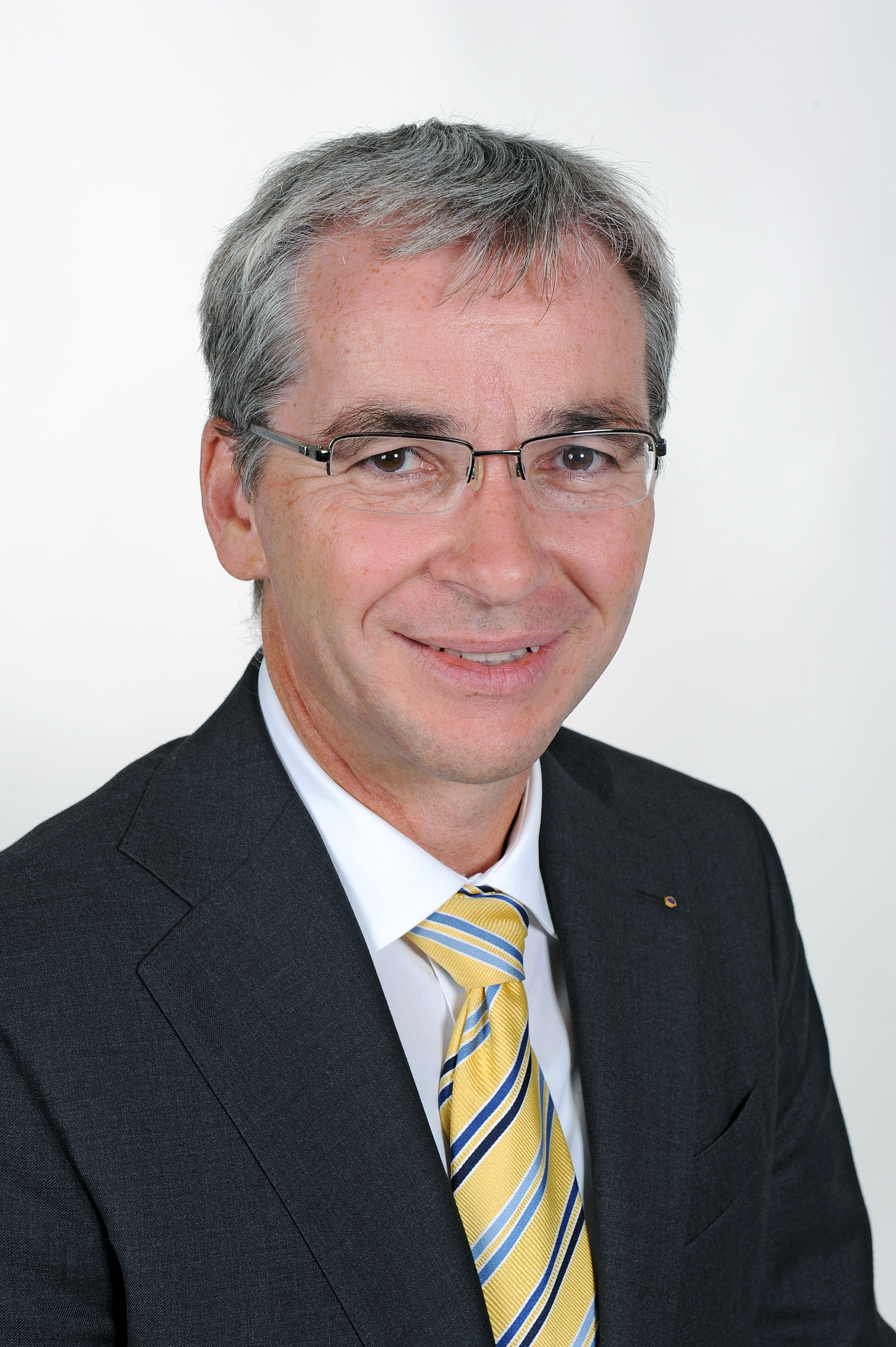
- Erich Ettlin in 2013

Member of the Council of States of Switzerland

Personal details
- Born: May 30, 1962 (age 64) Kerns, Switzerland
- Children: 2

Erich Ettlin (born 30 May 1962 in Kerns, Switzerland) is a Swiss politician who is a member of the Council of States of Switzerland.

== Biography ==
He was elected in 2015.
