= Daniela Schneeberger =

Swiss politician (born 1967)

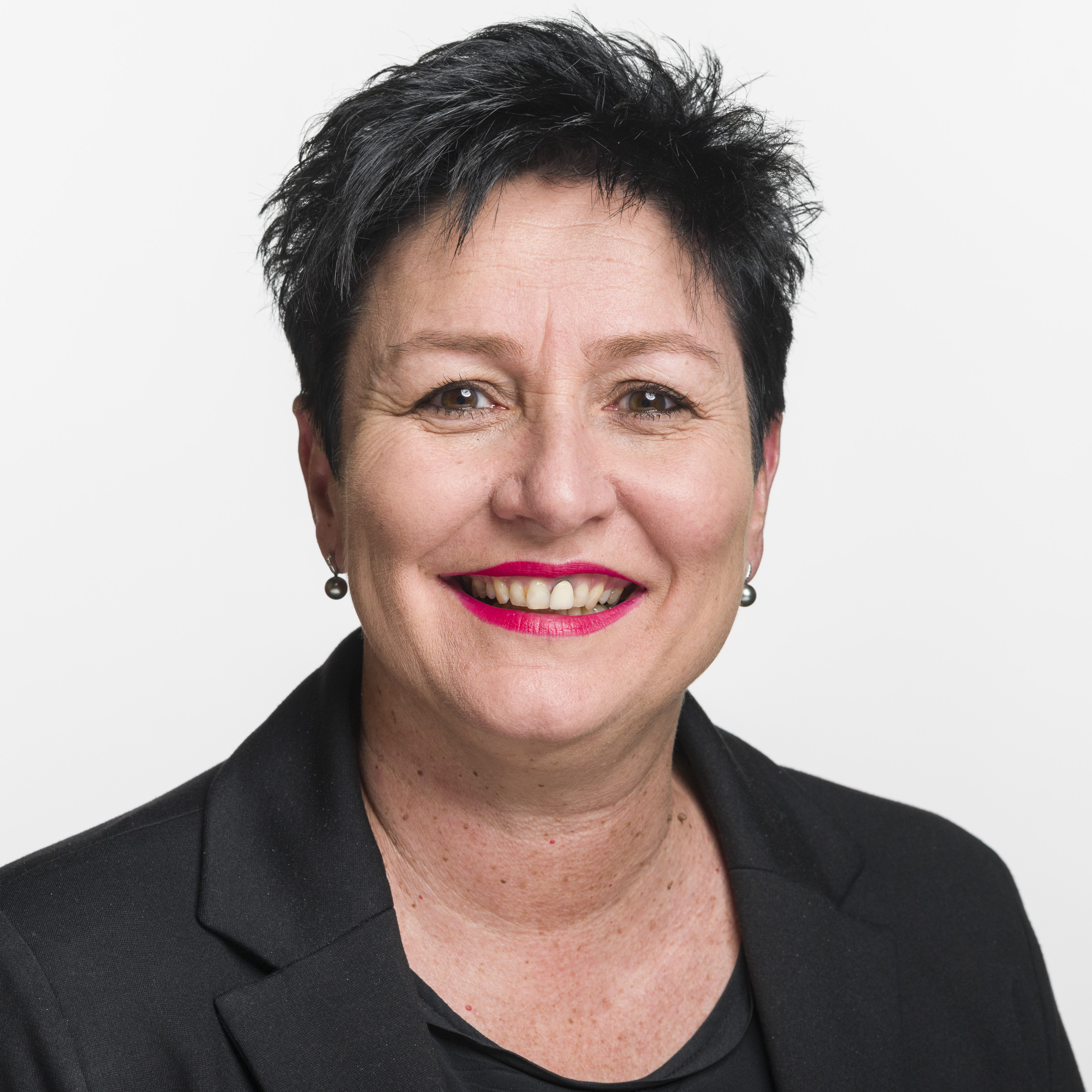
- Daniela Schneeberger in 2019

Member of the National Council of Switzerland
- Incumbent
- Assumed office 2011

Personal details
- Born: 19 September 1967 (age 58) Liestal, Switzerland
- Party: FDP.The Liberals

Daniela Schneeberger (born 19 September 1967 in Liestal; resident of Thürnen) is a Swiss politician from The Liberals.

== Education and career ==
Daniela Schneeberger graduated from commercial secondary school in Liestal and subsequently worked as a marketing and management assistant for the Frech brothers in Sissach. From 1992 to 2000, she worked as a trustee in her parents' company in Thürnen. From 2000 to 2002, she trained as a trustee with a federal professional certificate and is currently the managing director and owner of Schneeberger Treuhand in Thürnen, as well as a licensed auditor and partner at Duttweiler Treuhand in Liestal.

== Politics and associations ==
From July 1999 to December 2011, Daniela Schneeberger served on the Cantonal Council of Basel-Landschaft, chairing it from July 2004 to June 2005. She has been a member of the National Council since December 2011 ; in December 2015, she became a member of the Committee for Economic Affairs and Taxation, a position she still holds today. She is also co-chair of the Parliamentary Group for Trustees. Previously, she was a member of the Finance Committee, the State Policy Committee, and the Social Security and Health Committee.

Daniela Schneeberger sits on the board of the FDP Switzerland and the FDP parliamentary group in the Federal Parliament. She is president of the Swiss Association of Trustees (Treuhand Suisse) and vice president of the Swiss Union of Arts and Crafts. She chairs the Bern-based association Patronfonds, which promotes corporate welfare funds for employees. She is also president of the Swiss Retail Federation.

== Personal life ==
Daniela Schneeberger grew up in a politically active family. Her father, Robert Schneeberger, was also a district administrator and chaired the Basel-Landschaft cantonal parliament in 1994/95. Her brother, Jürg Schneeberger, was a municipal councilor in Frenkendorf; she also has a sister. Daniela Schneeberger lives with her partner in Thürnen.

== See also ==
- List of members of the National Council of Switzerland, 2023–2027
