= Marianne Maret =

Swiss politician

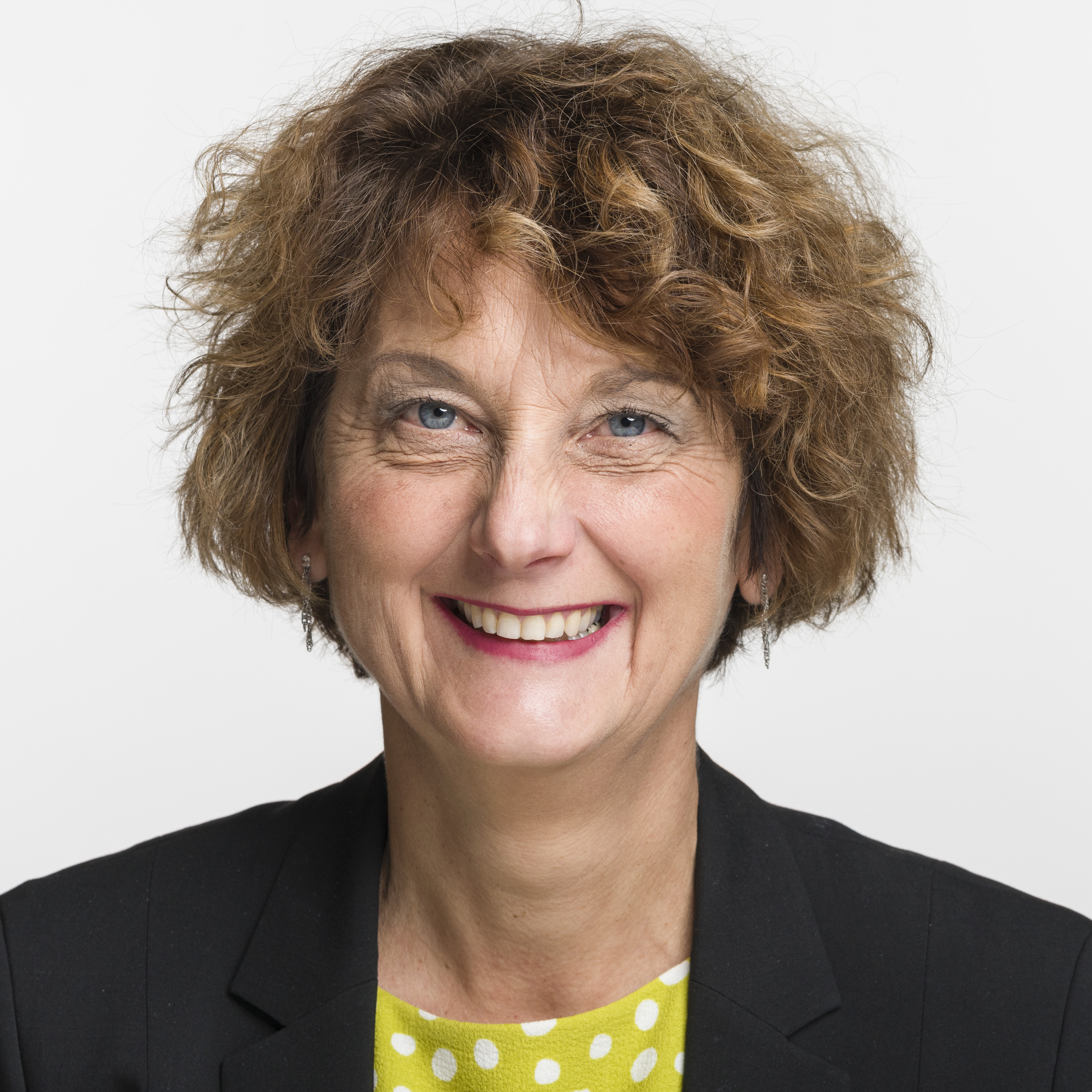
- 2019

Member of the Council of States of Switzerland
- Incumbent
- Assumed office 2 December 2019
- Constituency: Valais

Personal details
- Born: 15 June 1958 (age 68) Martigny, Valais, Switzerland
- Children: 4

Marianne Maret is a Swiss politician who is a member of the Council of States of Switzerland.

== Biography ==
Maret was elected in 2019.
