= Werner Salzmann =

Swiss politician (born 1962)

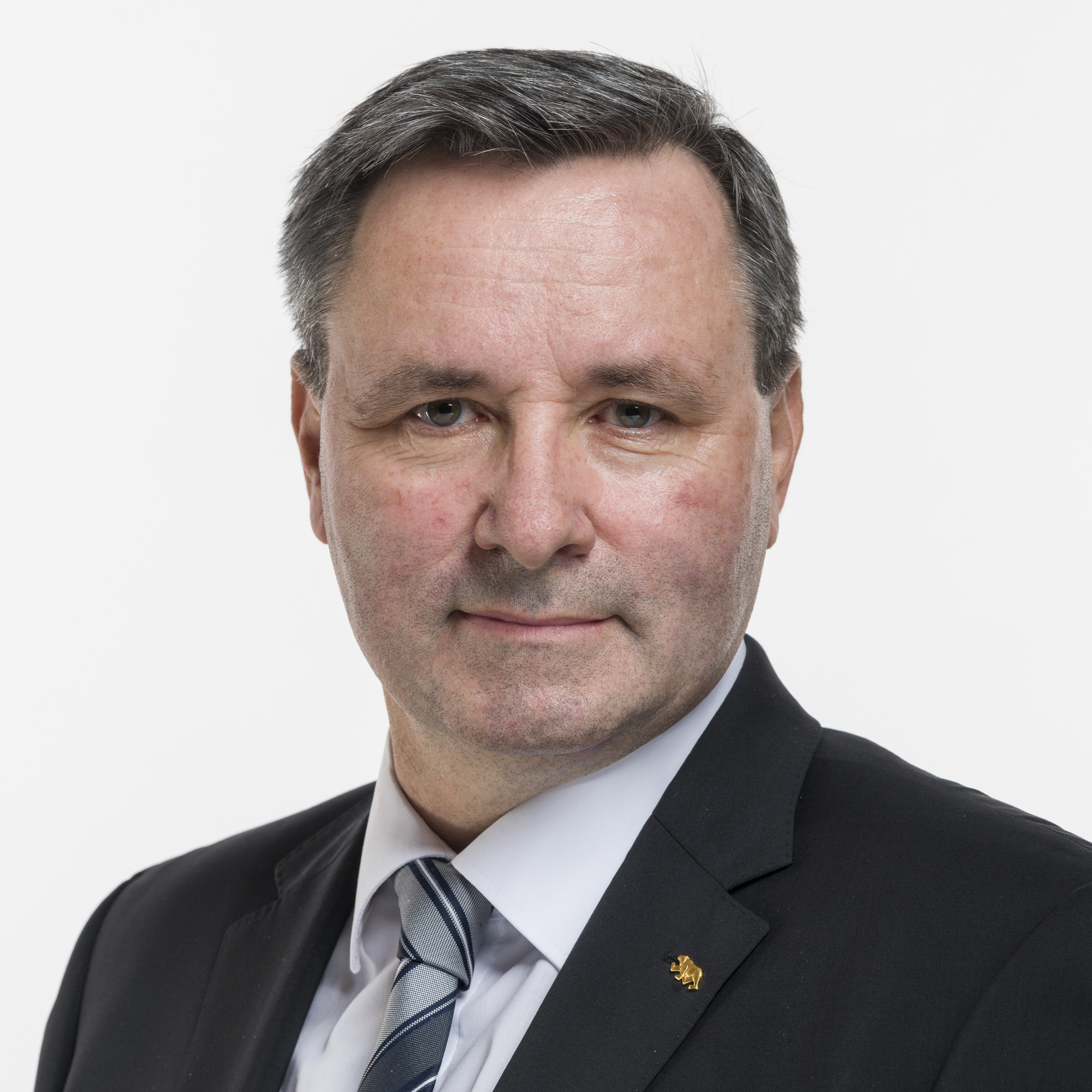

Member of the Swiss Council of States
- Incumbent
- Assumed office 2 December 2019
- Parliamentary group: Swiss People's Party
- Constituency: Bern

Member of the Swiss National Council
- In office 30 November 2015 – 1 December 2019
- Parliamentary group: Swiss People's Party
- Constituency: Bern

Personal details
- Born: Werner Salzmann; 5 November 1962 (age 63) Gurtendorf bei Wabern, Bern, Switzerland
- Party: SVP

Werner Salzmann (born 5 November 1962, Gurtendorf bei Wabern, Switzerland) is a tax expert and politician of the Swiss Peoples' Party (SVP). He is a cantonal chief tax chief expert in the Canton of Bern, a former member of the National Council and a current member of the Council of States.

== Education and professional career ==
He is a graduate of the Swiss agricultural school He was an agricultural tax expert in the Canton Bern between 1995 and 2007. In 2007 he was promoted to the agricultural tax chief expert of the Canton.

== Political career ==
He was elected to the National Council in the parliamentary elections of 2015. In the 2019 parliamentary elections he was elected to the Council of States. In the National Council he served as the head of the committee of security policy. In the Council of States he is the vice-president of the committee of security policy.

=== Political views ===
As the head of the committee of security policy he successfully campaigned to raise the military budget to a 1% share by 2030. To achieve this, he suggested to limit the expenditure for development aid and higher education in May 2022.

=== President of SVP in Canton Bern ===
He was elected the president of the Bernese branch from the SVP in 1995. By the SVP he is credited with achieving a conservative majority in the Bernese executive and that the SVP returned to the Council of States in 2019. In June 2021, he resigned. In October 2022, he was presented as candidate for the succession for Ueli Maurer, the resigning member of the Federal Council by the SVP branch of Bern.

== Personal life ==
He is married and has four children. In 2021, he assumed as the president of the Swiss association of vegetable producers.
