= Nelly Buntschu =

Swiss politician (born 1947)

Nelly Buntschu (born 10 December 1947) is a Swiss politician of the Swiss Party of Labour.

== Political career ==
Buntschu has been a member of the Swiss Party of Labour for over two decades, serving often in the leadership of the party's Geneva cantonal branch. She was elected the party president in August 2007, and served until giving up the position to Norberto Crivelli in 2009. Previously, she held office for eight years from 1999 to 2007 as Mayor of Vernier.

Buntschu is not very well known at the national level. At the local level, especially during her tenure as Mayor of Vernier, the development of public transport and the promotion of affordable housing were among her main concerns.

== Personal life ==
Buntschu was born on 10 December 1947, in Vernier. Buntschu is the mother of two daughters, and has one grandchild. She is vice president of a housing construction foundation in the area of Vernier.
