= Heidi Z'graggen =

Swiss politician

Heidi Z’graggen
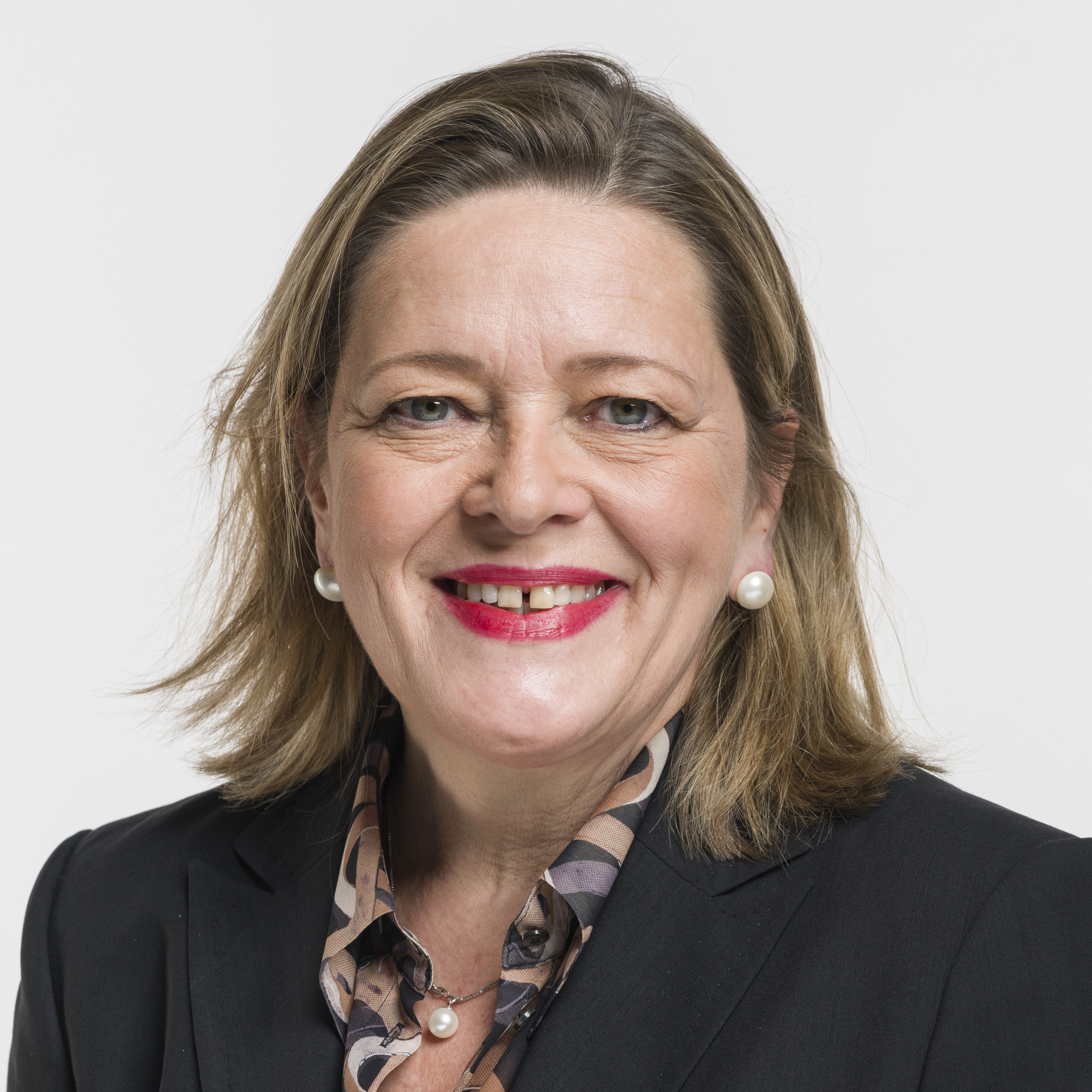
- Official portrait, 2019

Member of the Council of States
- Incumbent
- Assumed office 2 December 2019
- Constituency: Canton of Uri

Member of the Executive Council of Uri
- In office 1 May 2004 – 31 April 2020

Personal details
- Born: Adelheid Franziska Z’graggen; 1 February 1966 (age 60) Silenen, Switzerland
- Domestic partner: Bruno Dobler
- Education: University of Bern; University of Geneva
- Website: Official website (in German)

Adelheid Franziska Z’graggen commonly known as Heidi Z’graggen (born 1 February 1966) is a Swiss political scientist and politician who currently serves on the Council of States (Switzerland) for The Centre (previously Christian Democratic People's Party) since 2019. She previously served on the Executive Council of Uri between 2004 and 2020. In 2018, she was briefly a candidate for Federal Council (Switzerland) to succeed Doris Leuthard.

She currently engages in strategy and business consulting through UrImpuls AG headquartered in Altdorf, Switzerland. Z’graggen is a board member of Auto AG Uri (AAGU) as well as president of Fondssuisse and Alpinfra. She previously served on the board of CKW (energy).
