= Josef Dittli =

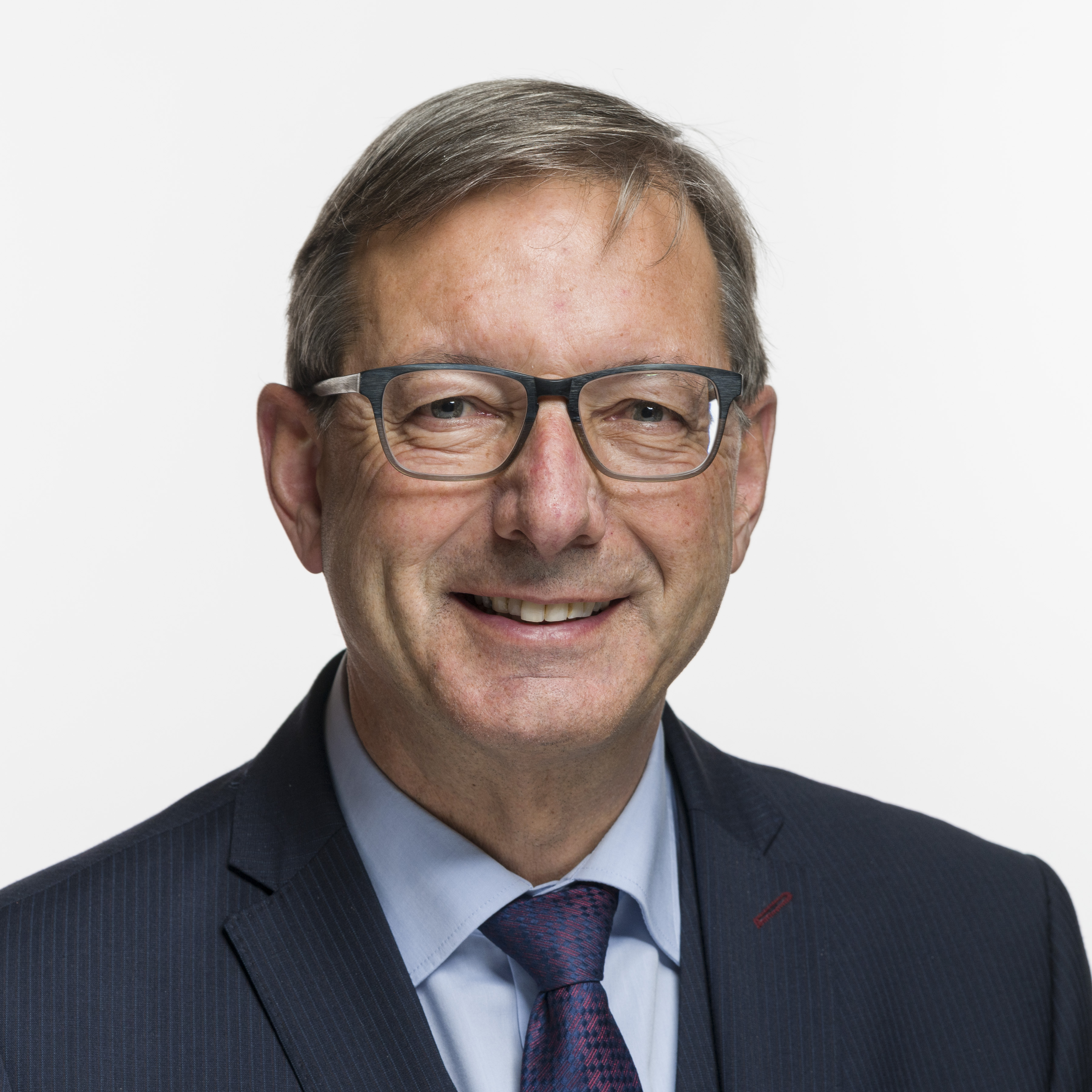
- Josef Dittli (2019)

Member of the Council of States (Switzerland)
- Incumbent
- Assumed office 30 November 2015
- Constituency: Canton of Uri

Personal details
- Born: Josef Dittli; 11 April 1957 (age 69) Attinghausen, Uri, Switzerland
- Party: The Liberals
- Other political affiliations: Free Democratic Party (until 2009)
- Spouse: Doris Storchi
- Children: 2
- Education: ETH Zurich; NATO Defense College
- Website: Official website

Military service
- Allegiance: Switzerland
- Branch/service: Swiss Armed Forces
- Years of service: 1975-2007
- Rank: Colonel (Oberst i.Gst.)

Josef Dittli (/dɪttləə/; Dit-lee born 11 April 1957) is a Swiss politician and former senior military officer of the Swiss Armed Forces. He currently serves as a member of the Council of States (Switzerland) for the Uri constituency and The Liberals. He previously served on the governing council of Uri from 2004 to 2016. Between 2012 and 2014 he served also in the capacity of Landammann for the Canton of Uri.

== Life ==
Dittli was born in Attinghausen where he attended the local schools. He later completed a teaching certificate. After working a few years in the profession he completed post-graduate studies at the Military Academy of the ETH Zurich.

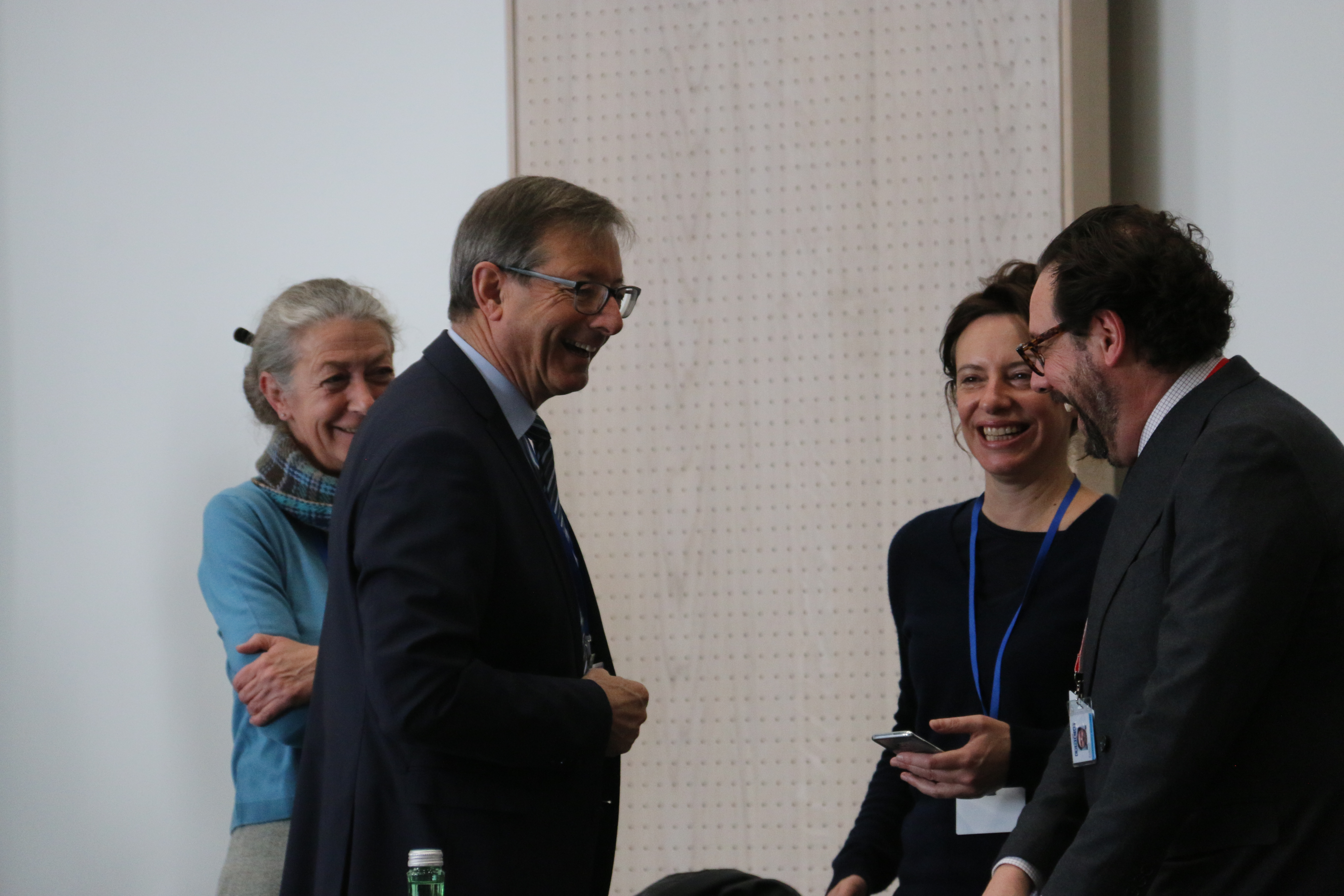
Josef Dittli, Head of Swiss Delegation, in Vienna (2020)

Between 1978 and 1985, Dittli worked in the public school system, as a teacher. After completing the Military Academy at the ETH Zurich he worked in several positions as a senior officer of the Swiss Armed Forces. In 2000, he completed a certification in Security Policy at the NATO Defense College in Rome, Italy. In the rank of General Staff, he was then, among other positions, commander of the management course II and finally commander of the tactical training center in the higher cadre training of the Swiss Armed Forces in Kriens.

Dittli has been President of the Health Insurers Association Curafutura since January 1, 2018, succeeding Ignazio Cassis, who was then elected to the Federal Council. Dittli is also chairman of the Board of Directors of Swisslos, a member of the Sport-Toto Society and President of the VAP Association of Retailers. He is also President of the Vested Benefits Foundation of Liberty Pension AG and the 3a Pension Foundation as well as a member on several other non-profit organizations.

== Politics ==
Since 30 November 2015, Dittli has been serving as a member of the National Council (Switzerland) for The Liberals.

== Personal life ==
Dittli is married to Doris (née Storchi) and has two adult children. He resides in Attinghausen.
