= Council of States (Switzerland) =

House of the Federal Assembly of Switzerland

(in official languages)
German	Ständerat
French	Conseil des États
Italian	Consiglio degli Stati
Romansh	Cussegl dals Stadis
- 52nd Council of States

Type
- Type: Bicameral

Leadership
- President: Stefan Engler, The Centre since 1 December 2025
- First Vice President: Werner Salzmann, SVP/UDC since 1 December 2025
- Second Vice President: Mathilde Crevoisier Crelier, SP/PS since 1 December 2025

Structure
- Seats: 46
- Political groups: The Centre (15) FDP/PLR (11) SP/PS (9) SVP/UDC (6) GPS/PES (3) GLP/PVL (1) MCG (1)

Elections
- Voting system: Two-round system (42 seats); Proportional representation (4 seats: Neuchâtel and Jura)
- First election: 1–27 October 1848
- Last election: 22 October 2023 (first round); 11, 19 and 26 November 2023 (second round)

Meeting place
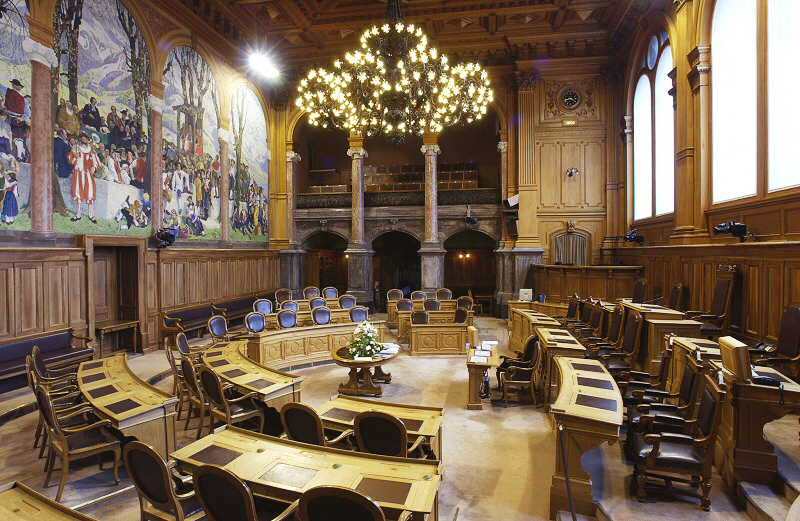
- Federal Palace of Switzerland, Bern

Website
- www.parliament.ch/en/organe/council-of-states

The Council of States (Note: German: Ständerat, French: Conseil des États, Italian: Consiglio degli Stati, Romansh: Cussegl dals Stadis.) is a house of the Federal Assembly of Switzerland, the other house being the National Council. As the powers of the houses are the same, it is sometimes called perfect bicameralism.

It comprises 46 members. Twenty of the country's cantons are represented by two councillors each. Six cantons, traditionally called "half cantons", are represented by one councillor each for historical reasons. These are Obwalden, Nidwalden, Basel-Stadt, Basel-Landschaft, Appenzell Ausserrhoden and Appenzell Innerrhoden. The councillors serve for four years, and are not bound in their vote to instructions from the cantonal authorities.

== Electoral system ==
Under the Swiss Federal Constitution, the mode of election to the Council of States is left to the cantons, the provision being that it must be a democratic method. All cantons now provide for the councillors to be chosen by popular election, although historically it was typically the cantons' legislatures that elected representatives to Bern.

Despite this freedom that the Constitution provides, all cantons except Neuchâtel and Jura (which use proportional representation to elect their councillors) elect councillors through an up to two-round system of voting. In the first round of voting, candidates must obtain an absolute majority of the vote in order to be elected. If no candidate receives an absolute majority in the first round of voting then a second round is held in which a simple plurality is sufficient to be elected. The two candidates with the most votes in the second round are elected.

However, eligibility to vote varies according to the applicable cantonal law. Two notable variations are that qualified foreigners may vote in Neuchâtel and Jura, and the minimum voting age is 16 in Glarus.

In all the cantons except Appenzell Innerrhoden the councillors are elected concurrently with the members of the National Council. In Appenzell Innerrhoden the representative is elected by the popular assembly (Landsgemeinde) during the April before the national vote.

== Working languages ==
In debates, councilors can choose any of the federal languages, usually the one they are most proficient in: German, French, Italian, or Romansh. German (High German) and French are the most frequently used. While the National Council offers simultaneous interpretation for German and French (since 1960) and Italian (since about 2000), the Council of States offers none. Councilors are expected to understand at least two languages, German and French.

== Voting ==
Issues before the council pass with a majority of the votes cast. The president of the council typically does not vote, unless there is a tie. In three cases, votes require a majority in both councils in order to pass: emergency legislation, votes on subsidies, guarantees, or any expenditure of more than 20 million CHF on a non-recurring basis, or 2 million CHF on a recurring basis. In any case where a majority of the council is required, the president of the council will vote.

Until 2014, votes in the chamber were conducted with members raising their hands to be counted. After Politnetz, a Swiss political information platform, recorded a 2012 vote regarding an import ban on reptile skins, it found that the official vote count differed from what was shown in the video. In what was called "Stöckligate", Politnetz showed that several votes on the matter all resulted in miscounts. (The name Stöckligate refers to a colloquial name for the Council of States. A Stöckli is a second home built on a farm for the elder farmer after the property has been deeded to the heirs. The name is applied to the chamber as it is viewed as having older members than the National Council.). As a result of the affair, council member This Jenny introduced a bill to require electronic voting.

Since 1 March 2014, votes in the Council of States have been conducted electronically, with a tally shown on electronic display boards. The rule changes also allowed for disclosure of how members voted. The recorded votes are made public for votes on overall bills, final votes, and votes that require a qualified majority. Names and votes will be published if 10 members request this.

== Membership ==
Council members earn a base salary of 26,000 CHF per year plus a 440 CHF per diem for attending sessions of the council or the committees. Members also receive 33,000 CHF per year for staff and material expenses. Members also receive food, travel and hotel allowances and a pension contribution. The Swiss government estimates that a member typically receives 130,000 to 150,000 CHF per year.

== Seats by party ==
Seats by party at the Council of States of Switzerland (2003–2023)
Party	Ideology	2003	2007	2011	2015	2019	2023
The Centre (DM/LC)	Centrism, Christian democracy, Conservatism	15	15	13	13	13	15
FDP.The Liberals (FDP/PRD)	Classical liberalism, economic liberalism	14	12	11	13	12	11
Social Democratic Party (SPS/PSS)	Social democracy, Democratic Socialism	9	9	11	12	9	9
Swiss People's Party (SVP/UDC)	National conservatism, right-wing populism, economic liberalism	8	7	5	5	6	6
Green Party (GPS/PES)	Green politics		2	2	1	5	3
Green Liberal Party (GLP/PVL)	Green liberalism		1	2			1
Conservative Democratic Party (BDP/PBD)	Conservatism / economic liberalism			1	1		
Others and Independent				1	1	1	1
Total		46	46	46	46	46	46

== Population per seat ==
The Council of States reflects the federal nature of Switzerland: seats are distributed by state (canton), not by population. Most cantons send two representatives, but the historic half-cantons (Appenzell Ausserrhoden, Appenzell Innerrhoden, Obwalden, Nidwalden, Basel-Stadt and Basel-Landshaft) each send one. Consequently, the number of people represented by a single seat in the Council of State varies by a factor of 45.8, from 16,000 for the half-canton of Appenzell Innerrhoden to 733,050 for each of the two seats for the canton of Zurich.

Abbr	Canton	Seats	Population^{1}	Per seat	Ratio^{2}
ZH	Zurich	2	1,466,100	733,050	1.0
BE	Berne	2	1,017,200	508,600	1.4
VD	Vaud	2	773,200	386,600	1.9
AG	Aargau	2	653,500	326,750	2.2
BL	Basel-Landschaft	1	283,200	283,200	2.6
SG	St. Gall	2	499,000	249,500	2.9
GE	Geneva	2	484,400	242,200	3.0
LU	Lucerne	2	398,700	199,350	3.7
BS	Basel-Stadt	1	191,800	191,800	3.8
TI	Ticino	2	351,900	175,950	4.2
VS	Valais	2	335,600	167,800	4.4
FR	Fribourg	2	307,400	153,700	4.8
TG	Thurgau	2	267,400	133,700	5.5
SO	Solothurn	2	266,400	133,200	5.5
GR	Grisons	2	196,600	98,300	7.5
NE	Neuchâtel	2	178,100	89,050	8.2
SZ	Schwyz	2	154,100	77,050	9.5
ZG	Zug	2	122,100	61,050	12.0
AR	Appenzell Ausserrhoden	1	54,500	54,500	13.5
NW	Nidwalden	1	42,400	42,400	17.3
SH	Schaffhausen	2	79,800	39,900	18.4
OW	Obwalden	1	37,100	37,100	19.8
JU	Jura	2	72,800	36,400	20.1
GL	Glarus	2	40,000	20,000	36.7
UR	Uri	2	36,000	18,000	40.7
AI	Appenzell Innerrhoden	1	16,000	16,000	45.8
Overall		46	8,325,200	180,983	4.1

Notes
^{1} Population data from 2015.
^{2} Relative representation compared to Zürich.

== See also ==
- Parliament Act (Switzerland)
- List of members of the Swiss Council of States (2019–2023)
- List of presidents of the Swiss Council of States
- Cantonal Council
- Political Institutions Committee

== Bibliography ==
- The Swiss Confederation – A Brief Guide 2015, Berne, Switzerland: Swiss Confederation, 28 April 2015, archived from the original (PDF) on 14 May 2013 – via Swiss Federal Chancellery FCh of the Federal Chancellor Corina Casanova
