= List of members of the National Council of Switzerland, 2023–2027 =

This is a list of members of the Swiss National Council for the 2023–2027 term as elected in the 2023 Swiss federal election.

== List ==
Surname	Political party	Canton	First elected	function
Benjamin Giezendanner	Swiss People's Party	Aargau	2019	Member
Martina Bircher	Swiss People's Party	Aargau	2019	Member
Thomas Burgherr	Swiss People's Party	Aargau	2015	Member
Christoph Riner	Swiss People's Party	Aargau	2023	Member
Andreas Glarner	Swiss People's Party	Aargau	2015	Member
Stefanie Heimgartner	Swiss People's Party	Aargau	2019	Member
Alois Huber	Swiss People's Party	Aargau	2019	Member
Gabriela Suter	Social Democratic Party	Aargau	2019	Member
Cédric Wermuth	Social Democratic Party	Aargau	2011	Member
Simona Brizzi	Social Democratic Party	Aargau	2023	Member
Maja Riniker	FDP.The Liberals	Aargau	2019	Member
Matthias Jauslin	FDP.The Liberals	Aargau	2015	Member
Andreas Meier	The Centre	Aargau	2023	Member
Maya Bally	The Centre	Aargau	2023	Member
Irène Kälin	Green Party	Aargau	2017	Member
Beat Flach	Green Liberal Party	Aargau	2011	Member
David Zuberbühler	Swiss People's Party	Appenzell Ausserrhoden	2015	Member
Thomas Rechsteiner	The Centre	Appenzell Innerrhoden	2019	Member
Daniela Schneeberger	FDP.The Liberals	Basel-Landschaft	2011	Member
Eric Nussbaumer	Social Democratic Party	Basel-Landschaft	2007	Member
Samira Marti	Social Democratic Party	Basel-Landschaft	2018	Member
Thomas de Courten	Swiss People's Party	Basel-Landschaft	2011	Member
Sandra Sollberger-Muff	Swiss People's Party	Basel-Landschaft	2015	Member
Elisabeth Schneider-Schneiter	The Centre	Basel-Landschaft	2010	Member
Florence Brenzikofer	Green Party	Basel-Landschaft	2019	Member
Patricia von Falkenstein	LPS	Basel-Stadt	2021	Member
Sarah Wyss	Social Democratic Party	Basel-Stadt	2020	Member
Sibel Arslan	Green Party	Basel-Stadt	2015	Member
Katja Christ	Green Liberal Party	Basel-Stadt	2019	Member
Lars Guggisberg	Swiss People's Party	Bern	2019	Member
Erich Hess	Swiss People's Party	Bern	2015	Member
Manfred Bühler	Swiss People's Party	Bern	2023	Member
Nadja Pieren	Swiss People's Party	Bern	2011	Member
Katja Riem	Swiss People's Party	Bern	2023	Member
Thomas Knutti	Swiss People's Party	Bern	2023	Member
Ernst Wandfluh	Swiss People's Party	Bern	2023	Member
Hans Jörg Rüegsegger	Swiss People's Party	Bern	2023	Member
Matthias Aebischer	Social Democratic Party	Bern	2011	Member
Nadine Masshardt	Social Democratic Party	Bern	2013	Member
Tamara Funiciello	Social Democratic Party	Bern	2019	Member
Ursula Zybach	Social Democratic Party	Bern	2023	Member
Andrea Zryd	Social Democratic Party	Bern	2023	Member
Kilian Baumann	Green Party	Bern	2019	Member
Aline Trede	Green Party	Bern	2018	Member
Christine Badertscher	Green Party	Bern	2019	Member
Lorenz Hess	The Centre	Bern	2011	Member
Reto Nause	The Centre	Bern	2023	Member
Jürg Grossen	Green Liberal Party	Bern	2011	Member
Kathrin Bertschy	Green Liberal Party	Bern	2011	Member
Melanie Mettler	Green Liberal Party	Bern	2019	Member
Christian Wasserfallen	FDP.The Liberals	Bern	2007	Member
Marc Jost	Evangelical People's Party	Bern	2023	Member
Andreas Gafner	EDU	Bern	2019	Member
Christine Bulliard-Marbach	The Centre	Freiburg	2011	Member
Marie-France Roth Pasquier	The Centre	Freiburg	2019	Member
Valérie Piller Carrard	Social Democratic Party	Freiburg	2011	Member
Nadine Gobet	FDP.The Liberals	Freiburg	2023	Member
Pierre-André Page	Swiss People's Party	Freiburg	2015	Member
Nicolas Kolly	Swiss People's Party	Freiburg	2023	Member
Gerhard Andrey	Green Party	Freiburg	2019	Member
Simone de Montmollin	FDP.The Liberals	Geneva	2019	Member
Cyril Aellen	FDP.The Liberals	Geneva	2023	Member
Delphine Klopfenstein Broggini	Green Party	Geneva	2019	Member
Nicolas Walder	Green Party	Geneva	2019	Member
Vincent Maitre	The Centre	Geneva	2019	Member
Christian Dandres	Social Democratic Party	Geneva	2019	Member
Estelle Revaz	Social Democratic Party	Geneva	2023	Member
Laurence Fehlmann Rielle	Social Democratic Party	Geneva	2015	Member
Roger Golay	Geneva Citizens' Movement	Geneva	2023	Member
Daniel Sormanni	Geneva Citizens' Movement	Geneva	2023	Member
Celine Amaudruz	Swiss People's Party	Geneva	2011	Member
Thomas Bläsi	Swiss People's Party	Geneva	2023	Member
Markus Schnyder	Swiss People's Party	Glarus	2023	Member
Magdalena Martullo-Blocher	Swiss People's Party	Graubünden	2015	Member
Roman Hug	Swiss People's Party	Graubünden	2023	Member
Anna Giacometti	FDP.The Liberals	Graubünden	2019	Member
Jon Pult	Social Democratic Party	Graubünden	2019	Member
Martin Candinas	The Centre	Graubünden	2011	Member
Pierre-Alain Fridez	Social Democratic Party	Jura	2011	Member
Thomas Stettler	Swiss People's Party	Jura	2023	Member
Franz Grüter	Swiss People's Party	Lucerne	2015	Member
Vroni Thalmann-Bieri	Swiss People's Party	Lucerne	2023	Member
David Roth	Social Democratic Party	Lucerne	2023	Member
Hasan Candan	Social Democratic Party	Lucerne	2023	Member
Leo Müller	The Centre	Lucerne	2011	Member
Priska Wismer-Felder	The Centre	Lucerne	2019	Member
Pius Kaufmann	The Centre	Lucerne	2023	Member
Michael Töngi	Green Party	Lucerne	2018	Member
Peter Schilliger	FDP.The Liberals	Lucerne	2020	Member
Damien Cottier	FDP.The Liberals	Neuchâtel	2019	Member
Baptiste Hurni	Social Democratic Party	Neuchâtel	2019	Member
Fabien Fivaz	Green Party	Neuchâtel	2019	Member
Didier Calame	Swiss People's Party	Neuchâtel	2023	Member
Regina Durrer-Knobel	The Centre	Nidwalden	2023	Member
Monika Rüegger	Swiss People's Party	Obwalden	2019	Member
Thomas Hurter	Swiss People's Party	Schaffhausen	2011	Member
Martina Munz	Social Democratic Party	Schaffhausen	2013	Member
Marcel Dettling	Swiss People's Party	Schwyz	2015	Member
Roman Bürgi	Swiss People's Party	Schwyz	2023	Member
Heinz Theiler	FDP.The Liberals	Schwyz	2023	Member
Dominik Blunschy	The Centre	Schwyz	2023	Member
Simon Michel	FDP.The Liberals	Solothurn	2023	Member
Christian Imark	Swiss People's Party	Solothurn	2015	Member
Remy Wyssmann	Swiss People's Party	Solothurn	2023	Member
Stefan Müller-Altermatt	The Centre	Solothurn	2011	Member
Felix Wettstein	Green Party	Solothurn	2019	Member
Farah Rumy	Social Democratic Party	Solothurn	2023	Member
Mike Egger	Swiss People's Party	St. Gallen	2019	Member
Lukas Reimann	Swiss People's Party	St. Gallen	2007	Member
Roland Rino Büchel	Swiss People's Party	St. Gallen	2019	Member
Michael Gotte	Swiss People's Party	St. Gallen	2023	Member
Walter Gartmann	Swiss People's Party	St. Gallen	2023	Member
Nicolo Paganini	The Centre	St. Gallen	2018	Member
Markus Ritter	The Centre	St. Gallen	2011	Member
Barbara Gysi	Social Democratic Party	St. Gallen	2011	Member
Claudia Friedl	Social Democratic Party	St. Gallen	2013	Member
Marcel Dobler	FDP.The Liberals	St. Gallen	2015	Member
Susanne Vincenz-Stauffacher	FDP.The Liberals	St. Gallen	2019	Member
Franziska Ryser	Green Party	St. Gallen	2019	Member
Lorenzo Quadri	Lega	Ticino	2011	Member
Alex Farinelli	FDP.The Liberals	Ticino	2019	Member
Simone Gianini	FDP.The Liberals	Ticino	2023	Member
Giorgio Fonio	The Centre	Ticino	2023	Member
Greta Gysin	Green Party	Ticino	2019	Member
Bruno Storni	Social Democratic Party	Ticino	2019	Member
Piero Marchesi	Swiss People's Party	Ticino	2019	Member
Paolo Pamini	Swiss People's Party	Ticino	2023	Member
Kris Vietze	FDP.The Liberals	Thurgau	2023	Member
Christian Lohr	The Centre	Thurgau	2011	Member
Nina Schläfli	Social Democratic Party	Thurgau	2023	Member
Diana Gutjahr	Swiss People's Party	Thurgau	2017	Member
Manuel Strupler	Swiss People's Party	Thurgau	2019	Member
Pascal Schmid	Swiss People's Party	Thurgau	2023	Member
Simon Stadler	The Centre	Uri	2019	Member
Sophie Michaud Gigon	Green Party	Vaud	2019	Member
Raphaël Mahaim	Green Party	Vaud	2023	Member
Leonore Porchet	Green Party	Vaud	2019	Member
Roger Nordmann	Social Democratic Party	Vaud	2004	Member
Samuel Bendahan	Social Democratic Party	Vaud	2017	Member
Brigitte Crottaz	Social Democratic Party	Vaud	2018	Member
Jean Tschopp	Social Democratic Party	Vaud	2023	Member
Jessica Jaccoud	Social Democratic Party	Vaud	2023	Member
Brenda Tuosto	Social Democratic Party	Vaud	2023	Member
Jacqueline de Quattro	FDP.The Liberals	Vaud	2019	Member
Olivier Feller	FDP.The Liberals	Vaud	2011	Member
Laurent Wehrli	FDP.The Liberals	Vaud	2015	Member
Daniel Ruch	FDP.The Liberals	Vaud	2022	Member
Céline Weber Koppenburg	Green Liberal Party	Vaud	2021	Member
Isabelle Chappuis	The Centre	Vaud	2023	Member
Jacques Nicolet	Swiss People's Party	Vaud	2015	Member
Michael Buffat	Swiss People's Party	Vaud	2015	Member
Yvan Pahud	Swiss People's Party	Vaud	2023	Member
Sylvain Freymond	Swiss People's Party	Vaud	2023	Member
Emmanuel Amoos	Social Democratic Party	Valais	2021	Member
Michael Graber	Swiss People's Party	Valais	2023	Member
Jean-Luc Addor	Swiss People's Party	Valais	2015	Member
Sidney Kamerzin	The Centre	Valais	2019	Member
Benjamin Roduit	The Centre	Valais	2018	Member
Philipp Matthias Bregy	The Centre	Valais	2019	Member
Philippe Nantermod	FDP.The Liberals	Valais	2015	Member
Christophe Clivaz	Green Party	Valais	2019	Member
Manuela Weichelt-Picard	Green Party	Zug	2019	Member
Thomas Aeschi	Swiss People's Party	Zug	2011	Member
Gerhard Pfister	The Centre	Zug	2003	Member
Gregor Rutz	Swiss People's Party	Zurich	2012	Member
Alfred Heer	Swiss People's Party	Zurich	2007	Member
Thomas Matter	Swiss People's Party	Zurich	2014	Member
Mauro Tuena	Swiss People's Party	Zurich	2015	Member
Barbara Steinemann	Swiss People's Party	Zurich	2015	Member
Benjamin Fischer	Swiss People's Party	Zurich	2022	Member
Martin Haab	Swiss People's Party	Zurich	2019	Member
Nina Fehr Düsel	Swiss People's Party	Zurich	2023	Member
Bruno Walliser	Swiss People's Party	Zurich	2015	Member
Martin Hübscher	Swiss People's Party	Zurich	2023	Member
Jacqueline Badran	Social Democratic Party	Zurich	2011	Member
Mattea Meyer	Social Democratic Party	Zurich	2015	Member
Priska Seiler Graf	Social Democratic Party	Zurich	2015	Member
Min Li Marti	Social Democratic Party	Zurich	2015	Member
Fabian Molina	Social Democratic Party	Zurich	2018	Member
Celine Widmer	Social Democratic Party	Zurich	2019	Member
Islam Aliyaj	Social Democratic Party	Zurich	2023	Member
Anna Rosenwasser	Social Democratic Party	Zurich	2023	Member
Balthasar Glättli	Green Party	Zurich	2011	Member
Marionna Schlatter	Green Party	Zurich	2019	Member
Bastien Girod	Green Party	Zurich	2007	Member
Katharina Prelicz-Huber	Green Party	Zurich	2019	Member
Martin Baumle	Green Liberal Party	Zurich	2003	Member
Corina Gredig	Green Liberal Party	Zurich	2019	Member
Barbara Schaffner	Green Liberal Party	Zurich	2019	Member
Patrick Hässig	Green Liberal Party	Zurich	2023	Member
Andri Silberschmidt	FDP.The Liberals	Zurich	2019	Member
Regine Sauter	FDP.The Liberals	Zurich	2015	Member
Hans-Peter Portmann	FDP.The Liberals	Zurich	2014	Member
Beat Walti	FDP.The Liberals	Zurich	2014	Member
Bettina Balmer	FDP.The Liberals	Zurich	2023	Member
Philipp Kutter	The Centre	Zurich	2018	Member
Nicole Barandun	The Centre	Zurich	2023	Member
Yvonne Bürgin	The Centre	Zurich	2023	Member
Nik Gugger	Evangelical People's Party	Zurich	2017	Member
Erich Vontobel	EDU	Zurich	2023	Member

== See also ==
- List of members of the Swiss Council of States (2023–2027)
