= List of members of the National Council of Switzerland, 2019–2023 =

This is a list of members of the Swiss National Council for the 2019–2023 term. The National Council has 200 members, each elected to represent one of twenty-six cantons. Elections were held on 20 October 2019, along with elections to the Council of States. Eleven parties are represented in the National Council, the largest of which is the Swiss People's Party. The Swiss Party of Labour/Solidarity coalition and the Geneva Citizens' Movement have the smallest representation with one member each.

== Members ==
Members by canton:

Name	Party	Canton	Notes
Benjamin Giezendanner	Swiss People's Party	Aargau	
Andreas Glarner	Swiss People's Party	Aargau	
Thomas Burgherr	Swiss People's Party	Aargau	
Martina Bircher	Swiss People's Party	Aargau	
Stefanie Heimgartner	Swiss People's Party	Aargau	
Alois Huber	Swiss People's Party	Aargau	Since 2 March 2020. Selected as a replacement for Jean-Pierre Gallati who resigned to take a position in the Aargau government.
Cédric Wermuth	Social Democratic Party	Aargau	
Yvonne Feri	Social Democratic Party	Aargau	
Gabriela Suter	Social Democratic Party	Aargau	
Matthias Jauslin	FDP.The Liberals	Aargau	
Maja Riniker	FDP.The Liberals	Aargau	
Irène Kälin	Green Party	Aargau	Second Vice President (2019-2020)
Ruth Humbel Näf	Christian Democratic People's Party	Aargau	
Marianne Binder-Keller	Christian Democratic People's Party	Aargau	
Beat Flach	Green Liberal Party	Aargau	
Lilian Studer	Evangelical People's Party	Aargau	
David Zuberbühler	Swiss People's Party	Appenzell Ausserrhoden	
Thomas Rechsteiner	Christian Democratic People's Party	Appenzell Innerrhoden	
Sandra Sollberger-Muff	Swiss People's Party	Basel-Landschaft	
Thomas de Courten	Swiss People's Party	Basel-Landschaft	
Eric Nussbaumer	Social Democratic Party	Basel-Landschaft	
Samira Marti	Social Democratic Party	Basel-Landschaft	
Daniela Schneeberger	FDP.The Liberals	Basel-Landschaft	
Florence Brenzikofer	Green Party	Basel-Landschaft	
Elisabeth Schneider-Schneiter	Christian Democratic People's Party	Basel-Landschaft	
Beat Jans	Social Democratic Party	Basel-Stadt	
Mustafa Atici	Social Democratic Party	Basel-Stadt	
Christoph Eymann	FDP.The Liberals	Basel-Stadt	
Sibel Arslan	Green Party	Basel-Stadt	
Katja Christ	Green Liberal Party	Basel-Stadt	
Albert Rösti	Swiss People's Party	Bern	SVP Party President
Andreas Aebi	Swiss People's Party	Bern	First Vice President (2019-2020)
Nadja Pieren	Swiss People's Party	Bern	
Erich von Siebenthal	Swiss People's Party	Bern	
Erich Hess	Swiss People's Party	Bern	
Andrea Geissbühler	Swiss People's Party	Bern	
Lars Guggisberg	Swiss People's Party	Bern	
Nadine Masshardt	Social Democratic Party	Bern	
Matthias Aebischer	Social Democratic Party	Bern	
Flavia Wasserfallen	Social Democratic Party	Bern	
Tamara Funiciello	Social Democratic Party	Bern	
Christa Markwalder	FDP.The Liberals	Bern	
Christian Wasserfallen	FDP.The Liberals	Bern	
Regula Rytz	Green Party	Bern	
Aline Trede	Green Party	Bern	
Kilian Baumann	Green Party	Bern	
Christine Badertscher	Green Party	Bern	
Jürg Grossen	Green Liberal Party	Bern	GLP Party President
Kathrin Bertschy	Green Liberal Party	Bern	
Melanie Mettler	Green Liberal Party	Bern	
Marianne Streiff-Feller	Evangelical People's Party	Bern	EVP Party President
Heinz Siegenthaler	Conservative Democratic Party	Bern	
Lorenz Hess	Conservative Democratic Party	Bern	
Andreas Gafner	Federal Democratic Union	Bern	
Pierre-André Page	Swiss People's Party	Fribourg	
Ursula Schneider Schüttel	Social Democratic Party	Fribourg	
Valérie Piller Carrard	Social Democratic Party	Fribourg	
Jacques Bourgeois	FDP.The Liberals	Fribourg	
Gerhard Andrey	Green Party	Fribourg	
Marie-France Roth Pasquier	Christian Democratic People's Party	Fribourg	
Christine Bulliard-Marbach	Christian Democratic People's Party	Fribourg	
Yves Nidegger	Swiss People's Party	Geneva	
Céline Amaudruz	Swiss People's Party	Geneva	
Laurence Fehlmann Rielle	Social Democratic Party	Geneva	
Christian Dandrès	Social Democratic Party	Geneva	
Simone de Montmollin	FDP.The Liberals	Geneva	
Christian Lüscher	FDP.The Liberals	Geneva	
Nicolas Walder	Green Party	Geneva	
Delphine Klopfenstein Broggini	Green Party	Geneva	
Isabelle Pasquier-Eichenberger	Green Party	Geneva	
Vincent Maitre	Christian Democratic People's Party	Geneva	
Michel Matter	Green Liberal Party	Geneva	
Stéfanie Prezioso	Solidarity	Geneva	
Martin Landolt	Conservative Democratic Party	Glarus	CDP President
Magdalena Martullo-Blocher	Swiss People's Party	Graubünden	
Jon Pult	Social Democratic Party	Graubünden	
Sandra Locher Benguerel	Social Democratic Party	Graubünden	
Anna Giacometti	FDP.The Liberals	Graubünden	
Martin Candinas	Christian Democratic People's Party	Graubünden	
Pierre-Alain Fridez	Social Democratic Party	Jura	
Jean-Paul Gschwind	Christian Democratic People's Party	Jura	
Yvette Estermann	Swiss People's Party	Lucerne	
Franz Grüter	Swiss People's Party	Lucerne	
Prisca Birrer-Heimo	Social Democratic Party	Lucerne	
Peter Schilliger	FDP.The Liberals	Lucerne	Takes office 7 September 2020. Selected as a replacement for Albert Vitali, who died 12 June 2020.
Michael Töngi	Green Party	Lucerne	
Ida Glanzmann-Hunkeler	Christian Democratic People's Party	Lucerne	
Leo Müller	Christian Democratic People's Party	Lucerne	
Priska Wismer-Felder	Christian Democratic People's Party	Lucerne	
Roland Fischer	Green Liberal Party	Lucerne	
Baptiste Hurni	Social Democratic Party	Neuchâtel	
Damien Cottier	FDP.The Liberals	Neuchâtel	
Fabien Fivaz	Green Party	Neuchâtel	
Denis de la Reussille	Swiss Party of Labour	Neuchâtel	
Peter Keller	Swiss People's Party	Nidwalden	
Monika Rüegger	Swiss People's Party	Obwalden	
Thomas Hurter	Swiss People's Party	Schaffhausen	
Martina Munz	Social Democratic Party	Schaffhausen	
Marcel Dettling	Swiss People's Party	Schwyz	
Pirmin Schwander	Swiss People's Party	Schwyz	
Petra Gössi	FDP.The Liberals	Schwyz	FDP Party President
Alois Gmür	Christian Democratic People's Party	Schwyz	
Christian Imark	Swiss People's Party	Solothurn	
Walter Wobmann	Swiss People's Party	Solothurn	
Franziska Roth	Social Democratic Party	Solothurn	
Kurt Fluri	FDP.The Liberals	Solothurn	
Felix Wettstein	Green Party	Solothurn	
Stefan Müller-Altermatt	Christian Democratic People's Party	Solothurn	
Lukas Reimann	Swiss People's Party	St. Gallen	
Mike Egger	Swiss People's Party	St. Gallen	
Roland Rino Büchel	Swiss People's Party	St. Gallen	
Esther Friedli	Swiss People's Party	St. Gallen	
Barbara Gysi	Social Democratic Party	St. Gallen	
Claudia Friedl	Social Democratic Party	St. Gallen	
Marcel Dobler	FDP.The Liberals	St. Gallen	
Susanne Vincenz-Stauffacher	FDP.The Liberals	St. Gallen	
Franziska Ryser	Green Party	St. Gallen	
Nicolò Paganini	Christian Democratic People's Party	St. Gallen	
Markus Ritter	Christian Democratic People's Party	St. Gallen	
Thomas Brunner	Green Liberal Party	St. Gallen	
Diana Gutjahr	Swiss People's Party	Thurgau	
Verena Herzog	Swiss People's Party	Thurgau	
Manuel Strupler	Swiss People's Party	Thurgau	
Edith Graf-Litscher	Social Democratic Party	Thurgau	
Kurt Egger	Green Party	Thurgau	
Christian Lohr	Christian Democratic People's Party	Thurgau	
Piero Marchesi	Swiss People's Party	Ticino	
Bruno Storni	Social Democratic Party	Ticino	
Alex Farinelli	FDP.The Liberals	Ticino	
Rocco Cattaneo	FDP.The Liberals	Ticino	
Greta Gysin	Green Party	Ticino	
Fabio Regazzi	Christian Democratic People's Party	Ticino	
Marco Romano	Christian Democratic People's Party	Ticino	
Lorenzo Quadri	Ticino League	Ticino	
Simon Stadler	Christian Democratic People's Party	Uri	
Jacques Nicolet	Swiss People's Party	Vaud	
Michaël Buffat	Swiss People's Party	Vaud	
Jean-Pierre Grin-Hofmann	Swiss People's Party	Vaud	
Pierre-Yves Maillard	Social Democratic Party	Vaud	
Samuel Bendahan	Social Democratic Party	Vaud	
Roger Nordmann	Social Democratic Party	Vaud	
Ada Marra	Social Democratic Party	Vaud	
Brigitte Crottaz	Social Democratic Party	Vaud	
Jacqueline de Quattro	FDP.The Liberals	Vaud	
Frédéric Borloz	FDP.The Liberals	Vaud	
Isabelle Moret	FDP.The Liberals	Vaud	National Council President (2019-2020)
Laurent Wehrli	FDP.The Liberals	Vaud	
Olivier Feller	FDP.The Liberals	Vaud	
Daniel Brélaz	Green Party	Vaud	
Sophie Michaud Gigon	Green Party	Vaud	
Léonore Porchet	Green Party	Vaud	
Valentine Python	Green Party	Vaud	
Isabelle Chevalley	Green Liberal Party	Vaud	
François Pointet	Green Liberal Party	Vaud	
Franz Ruppen	Swiss People's Party	Valais	
Jean-Luc Addor	Swiss People's Party	Valais	
Mathias Reynard	Social Democratic Party	Valais	
Philippe Nantermod	FDP.The Liberals	Valais	
Christophe Clivaz	Green Party	Valais	
Sidney Kamerzin	Christian Democratic People's Party	Valais	
Benjamin Roduit	Christian Democratic People's Party	Valais	
Philipp Matthias Bregy	Christian Democratic People's Party	Valais	
Thomas Aeschi	Swiss People's Party	Zug	
Gerhard Pfister	Christian Democratic People's Party	Zug	CVP Party President
Manuela Weichelt-Picard	Green Party	Zug	
Roger Köppel	Swiss People's Party	Zurich	
Gregor Rutz	Swiss People's Party	Zurich	
Alfred Heer	Swiss People's Party	Zurich	
Hans-Ueli Vogt	Swiss People's Party	Zurich	
Thomas Matter	Swiss People's Party	Zurich	
Barbara Steinemann	Swiss People's Party	Zurich	
Mauro Tuena	Swiss People's Party	Zurich	
Bruno Walliser	Swiss People's Party	Zurich	
Therese Schläpfer	Swiss People's Party	Zurich	
Martin Haab	Swiss People's Party	Zurich	
Jacqueline Badran	Social Democratic Party	Zurich	
Mattea Meyer	Social Democratic Party	Zurich	
Min Li Marti	Social Democratic Party	Zurich	
Priska Seiler Graf	Social Democratic Party	Zurich	
Angelo Barrile	Social Democratic Party	Zurich	
Fabian Molina	Social Democratic Party	Zurich	
Céline Widmer	Social Democratic Party	Zurich	
Beat Walti	FDP.The Liberals	Zurich	
Doris Fiala	FDP.The Liberals	Zurich	
Hans-Peter Portmann	FDP.The Liberals	Zurich	
Regine Sauter	FDP.The Liberals	Zurich	
Andri Silberschmidt	FDP.The Liberals	Zurich	
Bastien Girod	Green Party	Zurich	
Balthasar Glättli	Green Party	Zurich	Green Party President
Marionna Schlatter	Green Party	Zurich	
Katharina Prelicz-Huber	Green Party	Zurich	
Meret Schneider	Green Party	Zurich	
Philipp Kutter	Christian Democratic People's Party	Zurich	
Martin Bäumle	Green Liberal Party	Zurich	
Tiana Angelina Moser	Green Liberal Party	Zurich	
Corina Gredig	Green Liberal Party	Zurich	
Jörg Mäder	Green Liberal Party	Zurich	
Barbara Schaffner	Green Liberal Party	Zurich	
Judith Bellaïche	Green Liberal Party	Zurich	
Nik Gugger	Evangelical People's Party	Zurich	

== See also ==
- List of members of the Swiss Council of States
