= Klopfenstein =

Klopfenstein is a surname. Notable people with the surname include:

- Amélie Klopfenstein (born 2002), Swiss alpine skier
- Delphine Klopfenstein Broggini (born 1976), Swiss politician
- Joe Klopfenstein (born 1983), American football player
- Rachel Klopfenstein (born 1995), Mauritian athlete
- Roy Klopfenstein (born 1960), politician in Ohio, US
- Scott Klopfenstein (born 1977), American singer and multi-instrument musician
- Willy Klopfenstein (1921–2002), Swiss ski jumper
