= Barbara Gysi =

Swiss politician

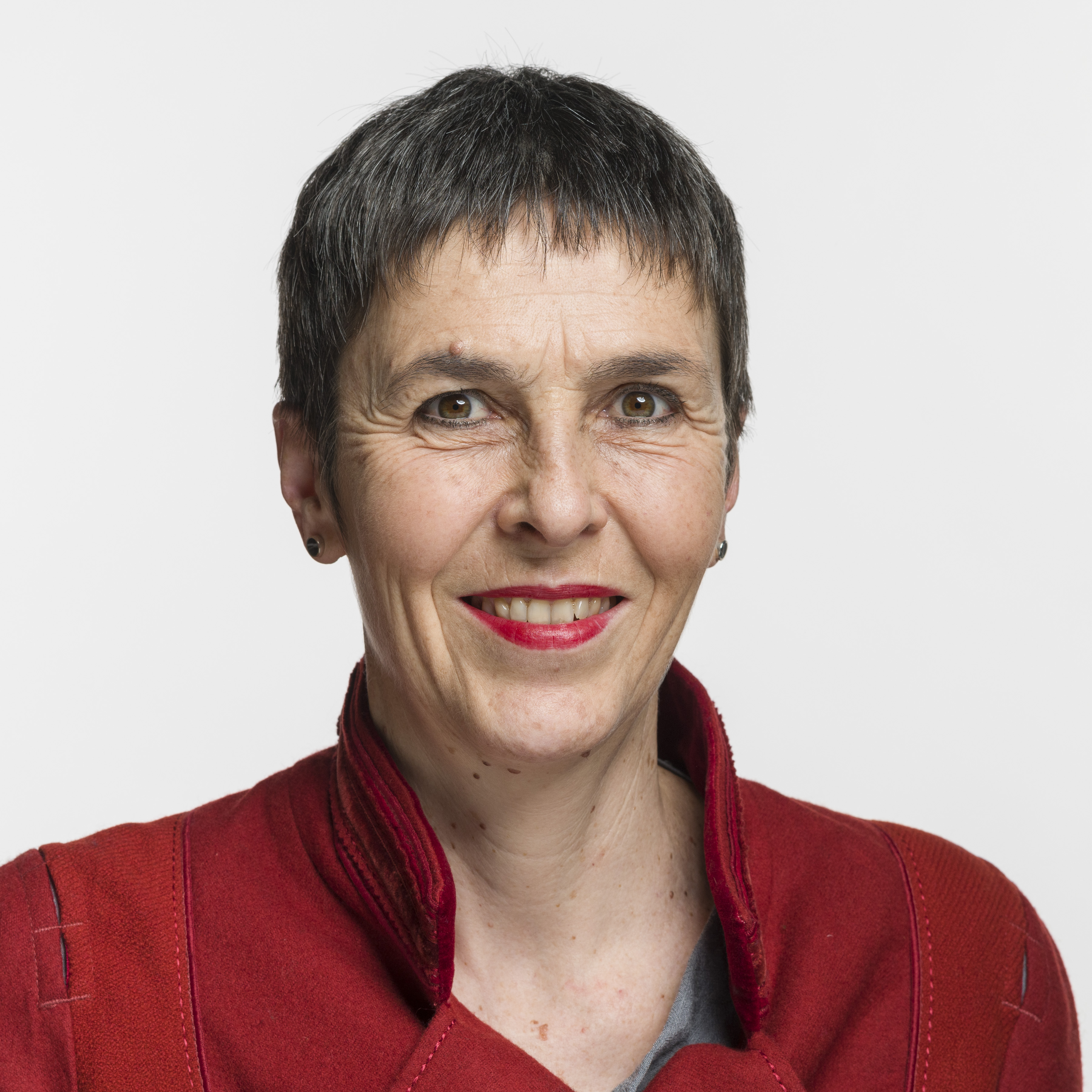
- Barbara Gysi in 2019

Member of the National Council
- Incumbent
- Assumed office 2011

Personal details
- Born: 14 May 1964 (age 62) Zurich, Swittzerland
- Party: Social Democratic Party
- Education: University of Zurich

Barbara Gysi (born 14 May 1964 in Zurich) is a Swiss politician from the Social Democratic Party of Switzerland (SP). She has served as a member of the National Council since 2011.

== Biography ==
Gysi studied at the University of Zurich from 1983 to 1986 and graduated as a secondary school teacher in biology and geography. Until 1991, she attended the School of Social Work in Zurich and graduated as a social pedagogue. After graduating, she moved to Wil. She worked as a social worker and social pedagogue until 1997. From 1997 to 2004, she was political secretary of the SP in the canton of St. Gallen. From 2012 to 2021, she was vice president of the SP Switzerland.

== Political career ==
=== Municipal and cantonal level ===
Gysi gained her first political experience when she ran for the National Council in 1995. The following year, she ran unsuccessfully for the Cantonal Council of St. Gallen, but was elected to the city parliament of the municipality of Wil. In 1999, she was elected to the cantonal parliament, but was not re-elected in the general elections in 2000. In 2001, she was elected to the Wil executive, the municipal council, where she took over the portfolio of leisure and sport. In the 2004 cantonal council elections, she was elected to the cantonal parliament with 3,438 votes. As a city councilor of Wil, she took over the portfolio of social affairs, youth and ageing the following year. In 2009, she was elected president of the Social Democratic faction in the cantonal council. She was considered a possible candidate for the cantonal council election in the canton of St. Gallen on 11 March 2012. However, at their party's conference, Heidi Hanselmann and Fredy Fässler were nominated.

=== National Council ===
In the 2011 Swiss federal election, Gysi achieved the third-best result on the Social Democratic party list with 17,331 votes, after the previous National Council members Hildegard Fässler and Paul Rechsteiner. With Rechsteiner's election to the Council of States, Gysi was able to move up into the National Council. She ran again in the 2015, 2019 and 2023 Swiss federal election and was re-elected each time. In the National Council, she has been a member of the Committee for Social Security and Health since 2015 (President from 2023); from 2011 to 2023 she was a member of the finance committee. In the by-election for the Council of States seat of the resigned Rechsteiner, Gysi received the third-most votes in the first round of voting on 12 March 2023. In the decisive second round of voting on 30 April 2023, she lost to Esther Friedli (SVP).

=== Trade union policy ===
Barbara Gysi is President of the Federal Staff Association (PVB). She ran for President of the Swiss Federation of Trade Unions (SGB) in 2018, but lost to Pierre-Yves Maillard.

== See also ==
- List of members of the National Council of Switzerland, 2019–2023
- List of members of the National Council of Switzerland (2023–2027)
