= Michael Götte =

Swiss politician (born 1979)

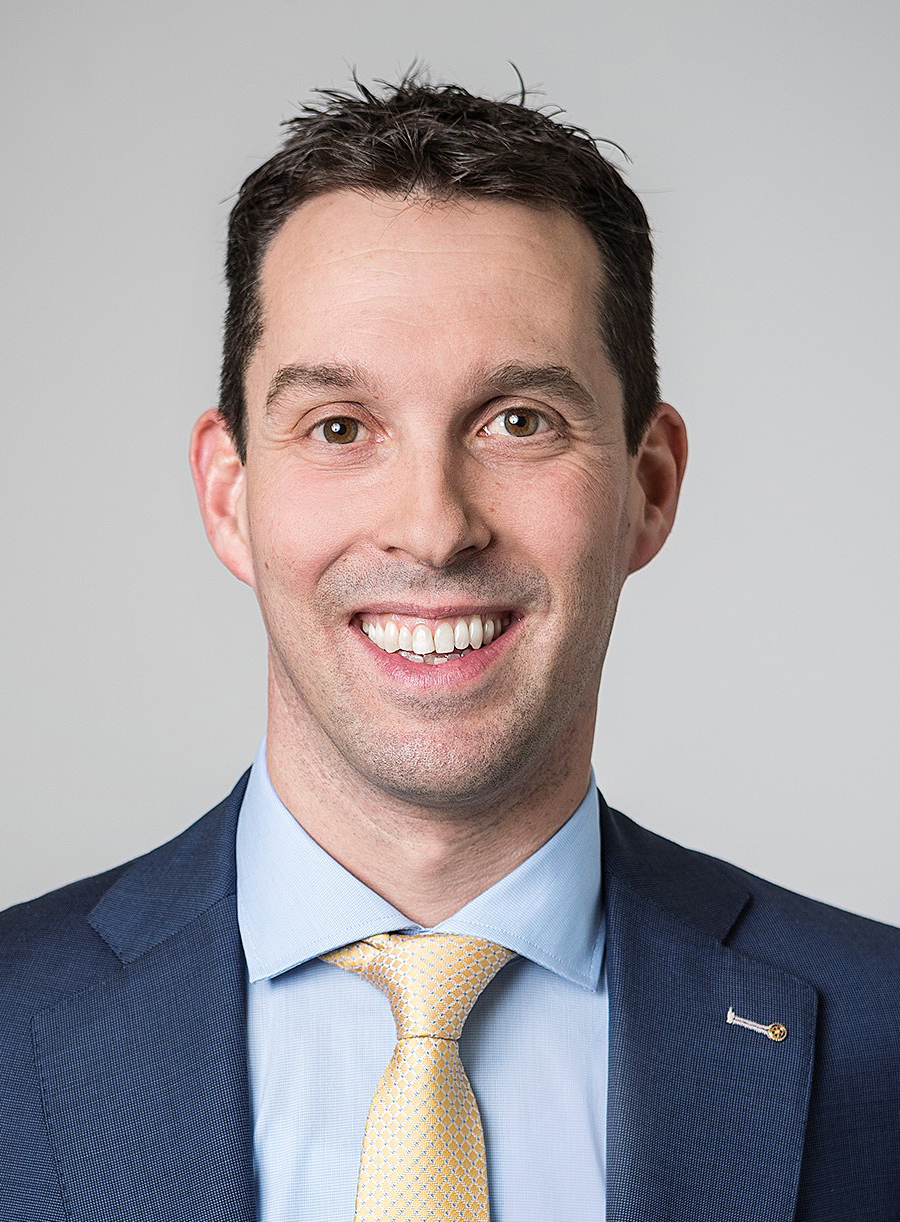
- Official portrait, 2023

Member of the National Council (Switzerland)
- Incumbent
- Assumed office 30 May 2023
- Preceded by: Esther Friedli
- Constituency: Canton of St. Gallen

Personal details
- Born: Michael Götte; 16 June 1979 (age 46) St. Gallen, Switzerland
- Party: Swiss People's Party
- Spouse: Andrea Götte
- Children: 3
- Occupation: Businessman, politician
- Website: Official website Parliament website

Michael Götte (born 16 June 1979) is a Swiss politician who currently serves on the National Council (Switzerland) for the Swiss People's Party since 2023. He entered the parliament as a replacement of Esther Friedli on 30 May 2023, who moved up to Council of States (Switzerland). This is a common procedure in many political systems to ensure that representation across different levels of the legislature is maintained. He concurrently serves as mayor of Tübach, Switzerland.
