= Simon Stadler (politician) =

Swiss politician (born 1988)

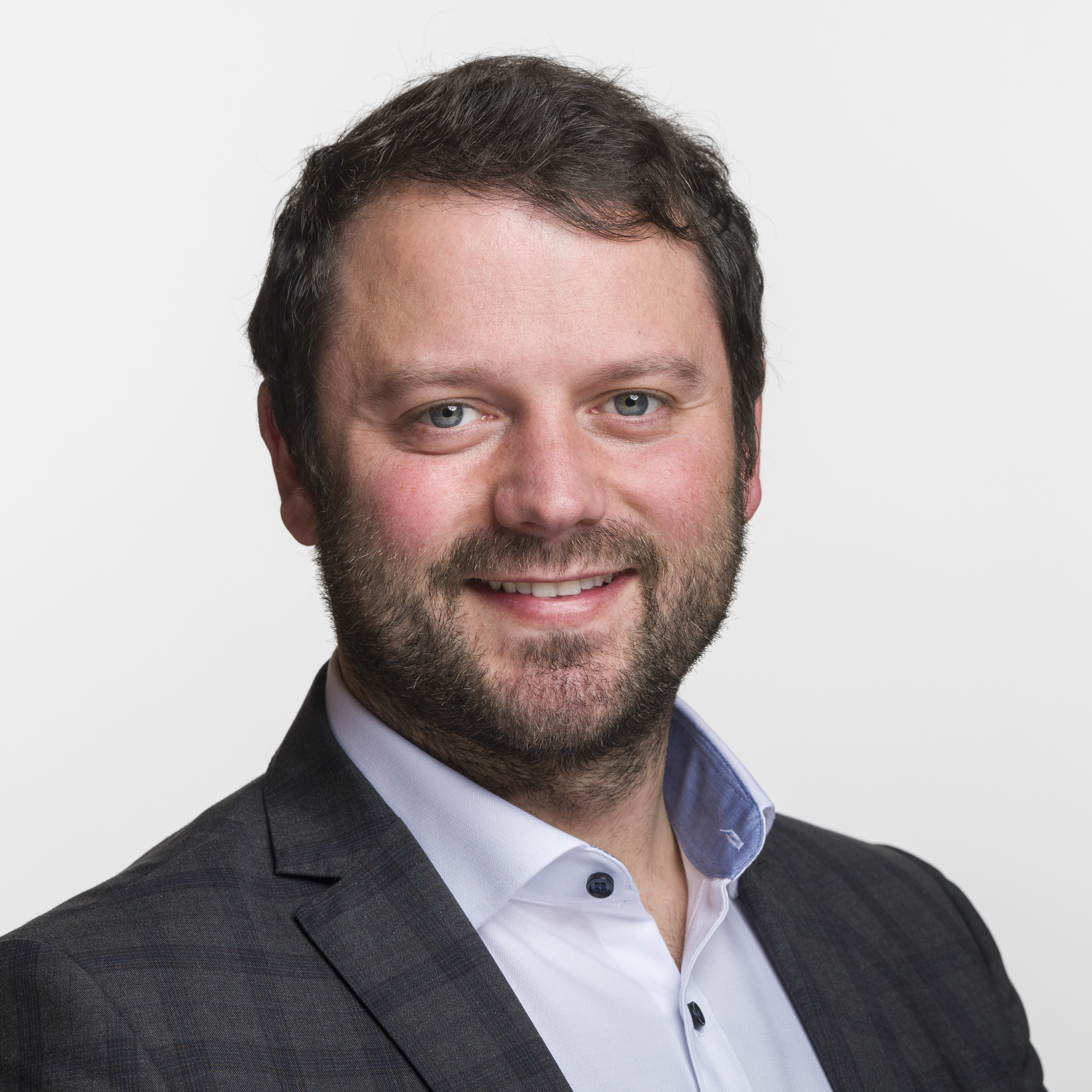
- Simon Stadler in 2019

Member of the National Council of Switzerland
- Incumbent
- Assumed office 2019

Personal details
- Born: 2 May 1988 (age 38) Altdorf, Uri, Switzerland
- Party: The Centre

Simon Lorenz Stadler (born 2 May 1988 in Altdorf, Uri) is a Swiss politician (Die Mitte, formerly CVP) from Altdorf in the canton of Uri.

== Life ==
Simon Stadler completed an apprenticeship as a bricklayer, obtained his vocational baccalaureate in 2012, and then studied pedagogy at the Schwyz University of Teacher Education. He worked as a primary school teacher until the election at the end of November 2019. He has been a board member of the CVP Altdorf since 2011 and was elected its president in 2016. He resigned in December 2020, but remained on the board. He is vice president of the Schweizer Wanderwege.

His father is the former Uri Landammann and former Council of States member Hansruedi Stadler.

In 2012, Stadler was elected to the Uri Cantonal Council (cantonal parliament) for the municipality of Altdorf, and was re-elected in 2016. Due to his election to the National Council in 2019, he did not stand for re-election in the cantonal council elections in March 2020. He was a member and vice-president of the Health, Social Affairs and Environment Commission and chaired the special commission for the renovation and new construction of the Uri Cantonal Hospital in Altdorf (Hospital Commission). In the cantonal council, Stadler campaigned primarily for the protection of cultivated land, the construction of a new hospital, and the relief of family caregivers. The construction of the new Uri Vocational and Further Education Center (bwz) in Altdorf was initiated by him.

In June 2019, the CVP Uri nominated him as a candidate for the canton of Uri's sole National Council seat in the federal elections in autumn 2019. On 20 October 2019, he was elected to the National Council at the age of 31. The CVP Uri thus won the seat for the first time since 1915. He holds (as of September 2025) a seat on the Finance Committee, the Committee for Transport and Telecommunications, the Legislative Planning Committee, the Editorial Committee, and its subcommittee for the German language. Previously, he was on the Committee for Science, Education, and Culture.

== See also ==
- List of members of the National Council of Switzerland, 2019–2023
- List of members of the National Council of Switzerland, 2023–2027
