= Christine Badertscher =

Swiss politician (born 1982)

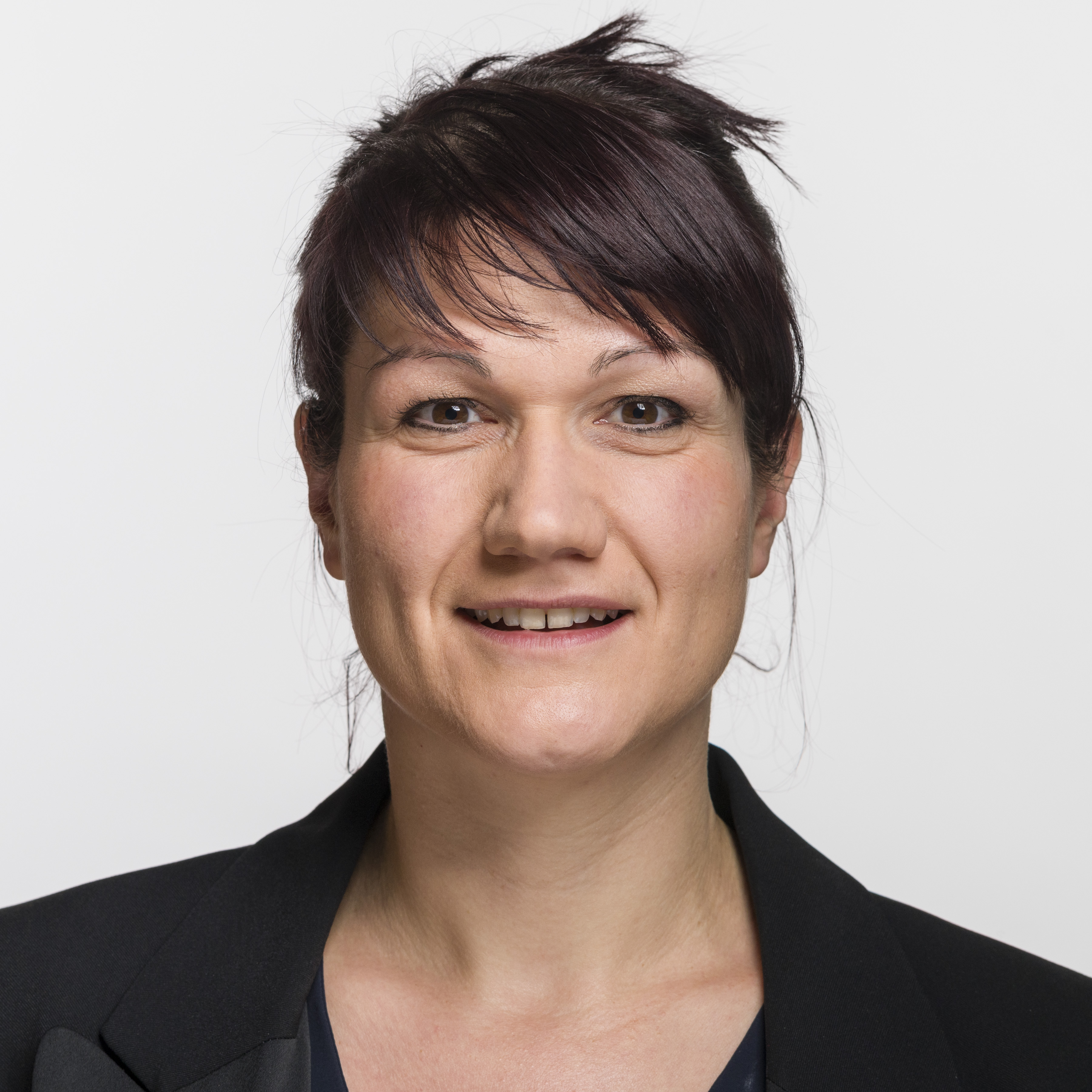
- Christine Badertscher in 2019

Member of the National Council of Switzerland
- Incumbent
- Assumed office 2019

Personal details
- Born: 11 January 1982 (age 44) Sumiswald, Switzerland
- Party: Green Party

Christine Badertscher (born 11 January 1982) is a Swiss politician from the Green Party. She has been a member of the National Council of Switzerland since 2019.

== Biography ==
Christine Badertscher grew up on a farm in the Emmental region of Switzerland. She completed a commercial apprenticeship and subsequently lived in Cameroon for an extended period. Upon returning to Switzerland, she studied environmental engineering in Wädenswil and then worked as a personal assistant to Alec von Graffenried, then a member of the National Council , for the Green Party of Switzerland. Badertscher studied agricultural sciences at the University of Agricultural, Forestry and Food Sciences in Zollikofen and worked on her parents' organic farm in Madiswil while studying. After graduating, she worked for the Swiss Farmers' Union in the area of agricultural and trade policy from 2013 to 2018 and has been responsible for food sovereignty at Swissaid since 2018. In 2020, she was elected to the board of the Economic and Public Welfare Society of the Canton of Bern (OGG). Since the same year, she has been a board member of the Swiss Association for Mountain Regions (SAB). She is also president of the Archive for Agricultural History (AfA). Christine Badertscher lives in Madiswil.

== Political career ==
Christine Badertscher was a member of the municipal council (executive) of Madiswil and president of the public safety commission from 2011 to 2018 .

In the national parliamentary elections of 20 October 2019, Badertscher was elected to the National Council for the Greens. She was re-elected in the 2023 elections.

Badertscher was president of the Green Party of Upper Aargau from 2013 to 2018 and has been vice president of the Green Party of the Canton of Bern since 2019. Since 2017, she has been the first president of the Upper Aargau Farmers' Association, a board member of the Bernese Farmers' Association and a board member of the Identity Upper Aargau Association. Since 2018, she has been vice president of the Association for the Promotion of Young People in Local Politics (FJG) and a member of the steering committee of International Certification Bio AG. Since 2019, she has been a member of the board of trustees of the WBM Madiswil Foundation and a member of the agricultural policy commission of the Swiss Association of Farm Women and Rural Women (SBLV).

== See also ==
- List of members of the National Council of Switzerland, 2019–2023
- List of members of the National Council of Switzerland, 2023–2027
