= Ernst Wandfluh =

Swiss politician (born 1976)

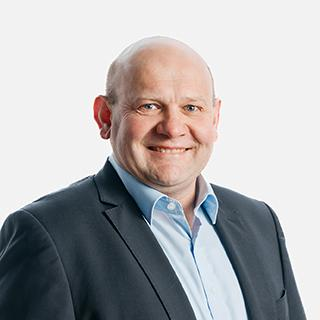
- Official portrait, 2023

Member of the National Council (Switzerland)
- Incumbent
- Assumed office 4 December 2023
- Constituency: Canton of Bern

Member of the Grand Council of Bern
- In office 1 June 2018 - 31 October 2023

Personal details
- Born: Ernst Wandfluh; 25 November 1976 (age 48)
- Children: 2
- Occupation: Mountain farmer, politician
- Website: Official website Parliament website

Ernst Wandfluh (German pronunciation: [ɛʁnst vandfluː]; born 25 November 1976) is a Swiss farmer and politician who currently serves on the National Council (Switzerland) for the Swiss People's Party since 2023. He previously served on the Grand Council of Bern from 2018 to 2023.
