= Delphine Klopfenstein Broggini =

Swiss politician

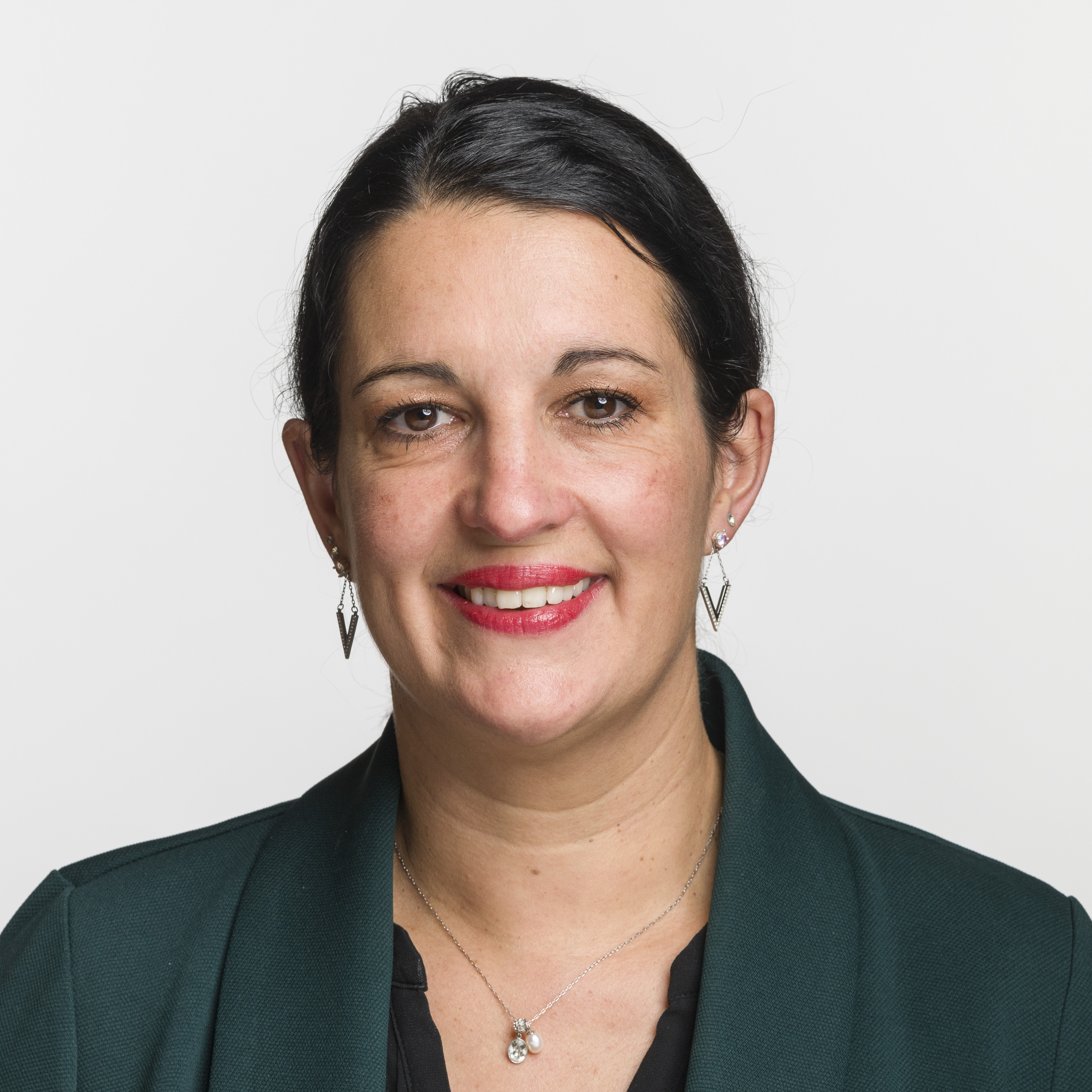
- Delphine Klopfenstein Broggini in 2019

Member of the National Council of Switzerland for Geneva
- Incumbent
- Assumed office 2019

Personal details
- Born: 9 June 1976 (age 50) Bern, Switzerland
- Party: Green Party

Delphine Klopfenstein Broggini (born 9 June 1976) is a Swiss politician from the Green Party of Switzerland and President of Pro Velo Schweiz.

== Life ==
Klopfenstein Broggini is a sociologist and works as co-general secretary of the Green Party of the Canton of Geneva. She is married, has two children and lives in Versoix.

== Political career ==
She has been a deputy member of the Grand Council of the Canton of Geneva since 2013 and a member since 2015, where she is a member of the Committee for Municipal, Regional and State Affairs. She is also a delegate of the Grand Council to the Mobility Committee of the Swiss-French Council of the Lake Geneva Region.

In the national parliamentary elections of 20 October 2019, she was elected to the National Council for the Green Party. There, she is (as of April 2022) a member of the Committee on the Environment, Spatial Planning and Energy, the 2019–2023 Legislative Planning Committee, and the Delegation for Relations with the French Parliament.

She is a board member of the Green Party of Switzerland, the women's and family advice center F-Information in Geneva, and Pro Natura Geneva. She is also a member of the patronage committee of Aqua Viva. On 30 November 2024, she was elected president of Pro Velo Switzerland.

== See also ==
- List of members of the National Council of Switzerland, 2019–2023
- List of members of the National Council of Switzerland, 2023–2027
