= Nina Schläfli =

Swiss politician (born 1990)

Member of the National Council (Switzerland)
- Incumbent
- Assumed office 4 December 2023
- Preceded by: Flavia Wasserfallen
- Constituency: Canton of Thurgau

Personal details
- Born: Nina Schläfli
- Spouse: Martin Rempe
- Children: 1
- Occupation: Politician, historian

Nina Schläfli (born 1 January 1990 in Münsterlingen) is a Swiss historian and politician who currently serves on the National Council (Switzerland) since 2023. She previously served on the Grand Council of Thurgau between 2016 and 2024 as well as on the municipal council of Kreuzlingen between 2012 and 2016. She is a member of the Social Democratic Party of Switzerland.

== Early life and education ==
Schläfli was born 1 January 1990 in Münsterlingen, Switzerland, the oldest of three children, to Ruedi Schläfli and Gabi Schläfli (née Frischknecht). After completing her Matura she initially studied history and german literature at the University of Constance starting in 2009. She is currently completing her Doctorate, at the Historic Institute of the University of Bern. Her thesis is on historic boats manufactured by Escher Wyss and Sulzer during the years 1836 to 1928.

== Personal life ==
She is married to Martin Rempe and has one child.
