= Remy Wyssmann =

Swiss politician (born 1967)

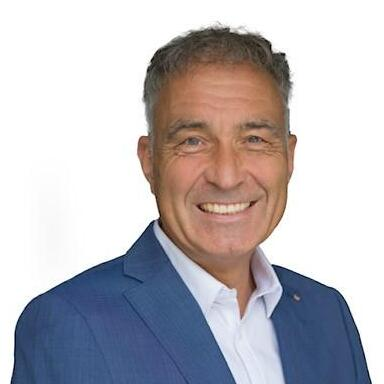

Member of the National Council (Switzerland)
- Incumbent
- Assumed office 4 December 2023
- Constituency: Canton of Solothurn

Member of the Cantonal Council of Solothurn
- In office 2017 – 30 November 2023

Personal details
- Born: Rémy Wyssmann; 20 June 1967 (age 57)
- Children: 2
- Occupation: Businessman, attorney, notary public, politician
- Website: Official website Parliament website

Remy Wyssmann (Swiss Standard German: [ˈʁemi ˈviːsman]; born 20 June 1967) is a Swiss businessman, attorney, notary public and politician who currently serves on the National Council (Switzerland) for the Swiss People's Party since 2023. He previously served on the Cantonal Council of Solothurn between 2017 and 2023.

== Career ==
Wyssmann is a partner in his law firm Wyssmann & Partner in Oensingen.

== Politics ==
He has been a member of the Cantonal Council of Solothurn between 2017 and 30 November 2023. During the 2023 Swiss federal election, he was elected to serve on the National Council (Switzerland), assuming office on 4 December 2023. Since 2024, he additional serves as cantonal president of the Swiss People's Party in Solothurn.

== Personal life ==
Wyssmann is married and has two sons.
