= Therese Schläpfer =

Swiss businesswoman and politician

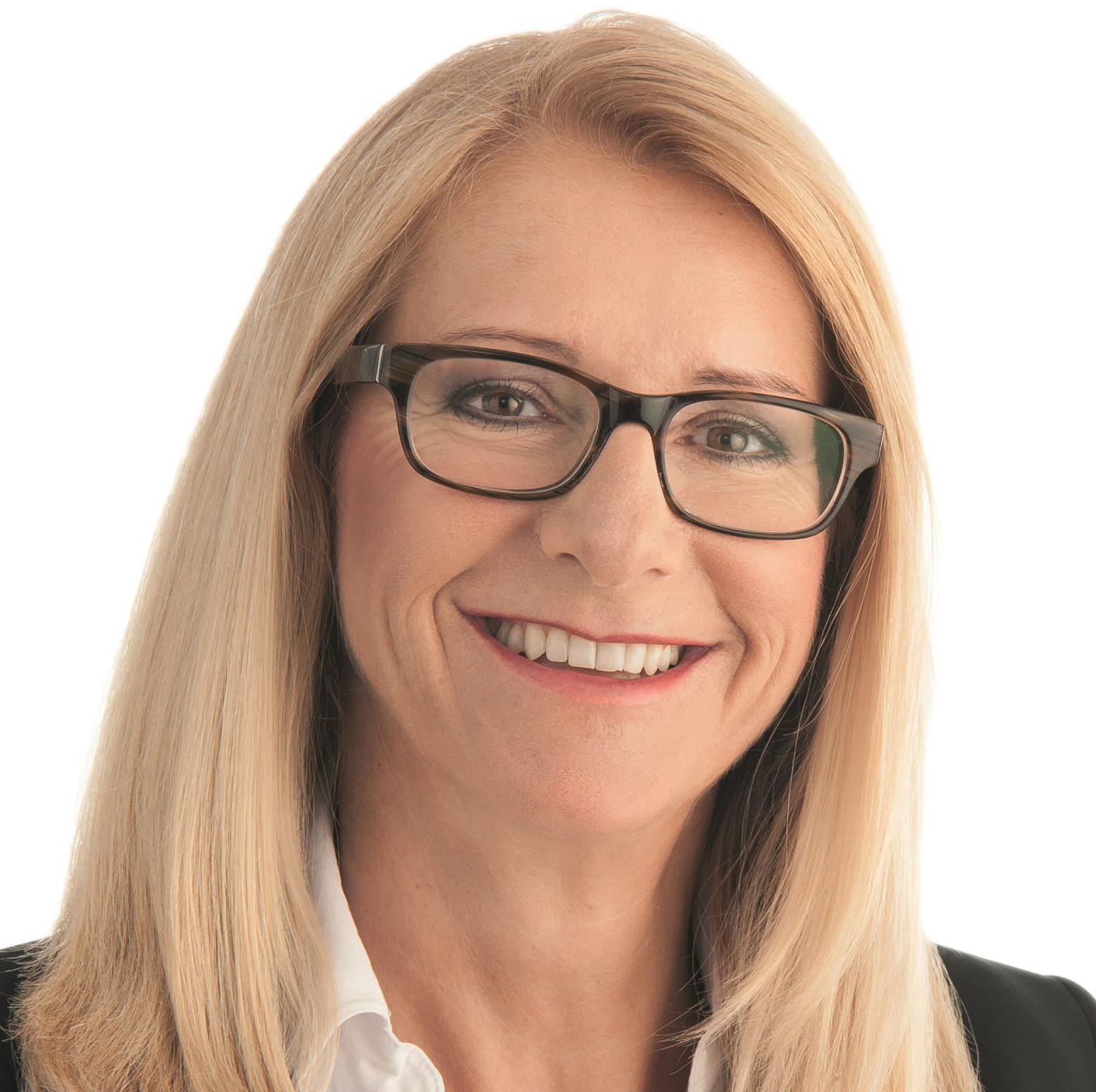
- Official portrait, 2019

Member of the National Council (Switzerland)
- In office 2 June 2019 – 3 December 2023
- Preceded by: Jürg Stahl
- Constituency: Canton of Zürich

Personal details
- Born: Therese Weber; 14 April 1959 (age 67) Hagenbuch, Switzerland
- Party: Swiss People's Party
- Spouse: Bruno Schläpfer
- Children: 3
- Occupation: Businesswoman, flight attendant
- Website: Official website (in German)

Therese Schläpfer (née Weber; born 14 April 1959) is a Swiss businesswoman, politician and former flight attendant. She served as a member of the National Council (Switzerland) from 2019 to 2023. In 2019, she was initially elected into Cantonal Council of Zürich, but did not take office after it became public that she could potentially be elected as successor of Jürg Stahl, directly into National Council (Switzerland).

== Early life and education ==
Schläpfer was born Therese Weber on 14 April 1959 in Hagenbuch, Switzerland, to Walter Weber (1934-2018) and Ruth Weber (née Pfeil; 1933–2022). She has one older and one younger brother. In 1955, her father founded Walter Weber Ltd., in Ormalingen which company is specialized in heating systems.

She completed her schooling in Ormalingen and Gelterkinden before attending finishing school for one year in French-speaking Switzerland. Then she completed an apprenticeship in retail and completed several professional certifications.

== Career ==
Between 1982 and 2003, Schläpfer worked for Swissair, last in the position of purser. Between 1990 and 2000, she also engaged in business development of the company of her husband (Schläpfer Messtechnik Ltd.), primarily in being secretary, accountant and staff administration. In 2003, her husband sold his company and the family traveled the world for one year. In 2005, she helped to launch the second company of her husband (Sensormate Ltd.). Between 2005 and 2009 she was the treasurer of the Sports Association, Hagenbuch and from 2008 to 2014 a member of the Youth Commission in Elgg.

== Politics ==
Schläpfer initially served as a member on the municipal council of Hagenbuch from 2010 to 2014. She was assigned the department of Health and Social Services and also served on several commissions. Between 2014 and 2022 she was the mayor of Hagenbuch. In June 2019, she became the successor of Jürg Stahl, in the National Council (Switzerland) assuming office on 3 June 2019.

== Personal life ==
She is married to Bruno Schläpfer and has 3 children. They reside in Hagenbuch.
