= Franz Ruppen =

Swiss politician

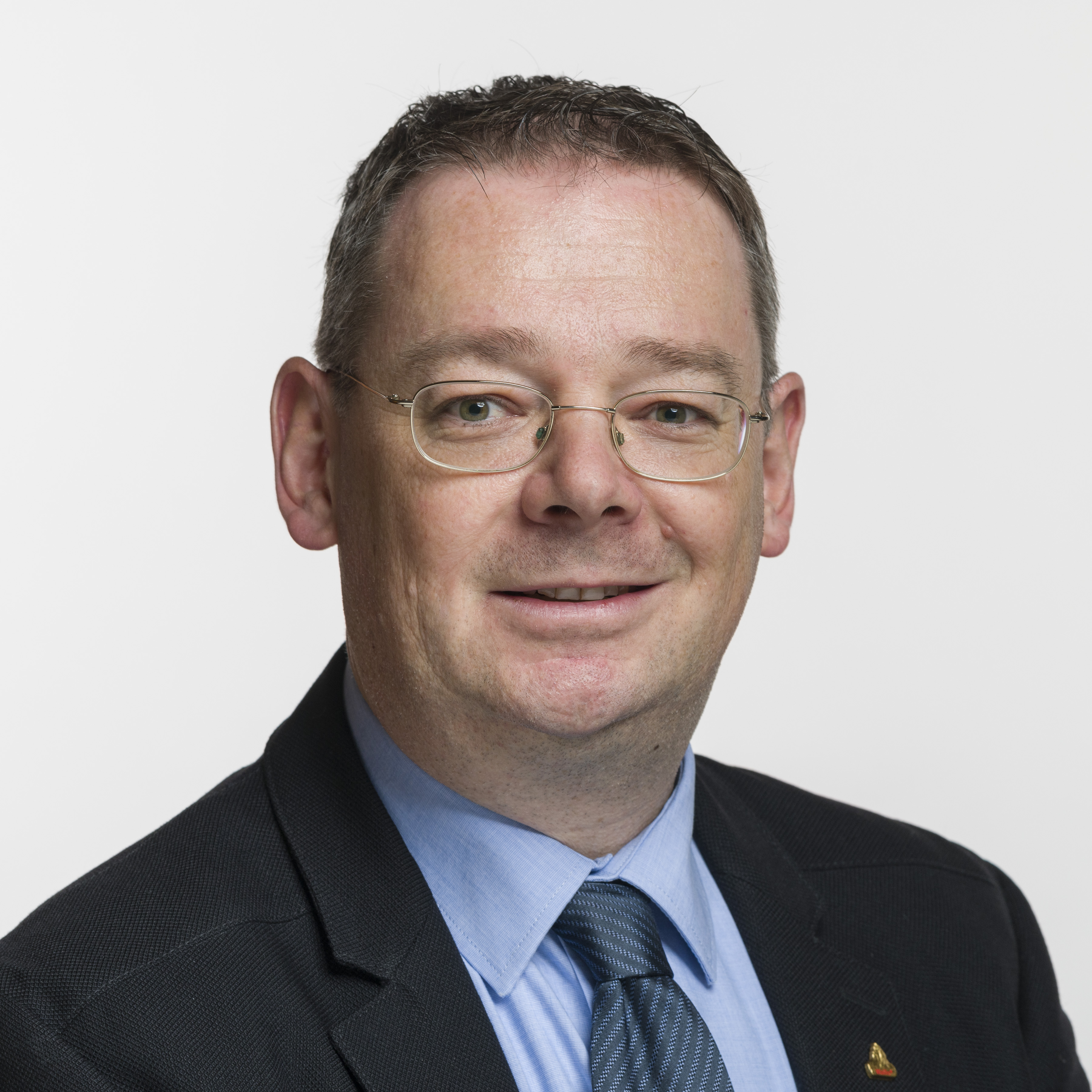
- Official portrait, 2019

Member of the State Council of Valais
- Incumbent
- Assumed office 2021

Member of the National Council (Switzerland)
- In office 30 November 2015 – 30 March 2021

Personal details
- Born: Franz Karl Ruppen; 24 February 1971 (age 55) Sierre, Switzerland
- Party: Swiss People's Party
- Education: Spiritus Sanctus College, Brigue
- Alma mater: University of Bern (Licentiate)
- Occupation: Attorney, notary public and politician

Franz Karl Ruppen (born 24 February 1971) is a Swiss attorney, notary public and politician who has been a Councilor of State of Valais since 2021. He previously served on the National Council (Switzerland) for the Swiss People's Party from 2015 to 2021. Ruppen also served on the Grand Council of Valais from 2005 to 2015.
