= Thomas Brunner (Swiss politician) =

Swiss politician (1960–2025)

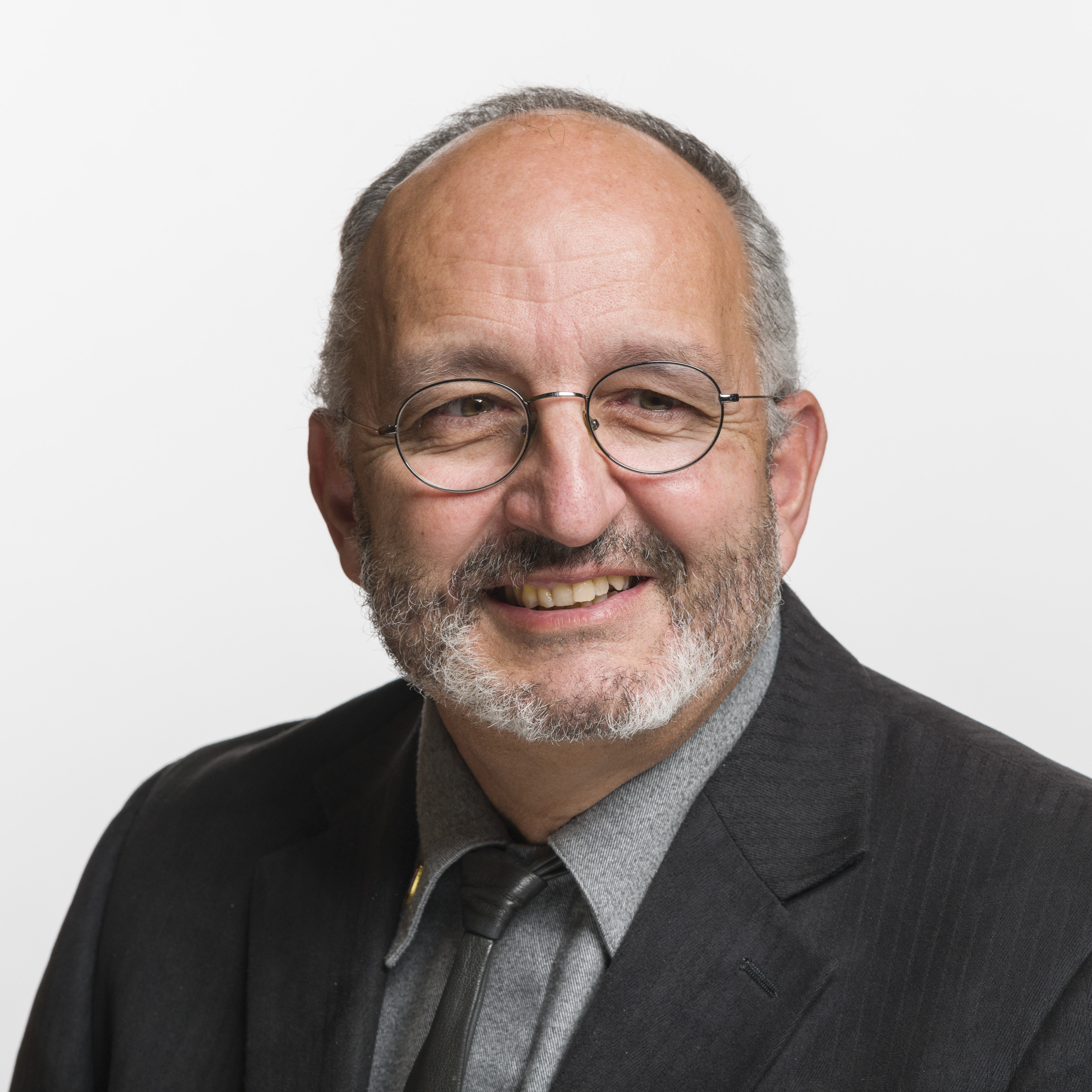
- Brunner in 2019

Member of the Swiss National Council
- In office 2 December 2019 – 3 December 2023

Personal details
- Born: 25 July 1960 St. Gallen, Switzerland
- Died: 15 May 2025 (aged 64)
- Political party: GLP
- Education: University of Bern
- Occupation: Climatologist

Thomas Brunner (25 July 1960 – 15 May 2025) was a Swiss politician of the Green Liberal Party (GLP).

== Life and career ==
Born in St. Gallen on 25 July 1960, Brunner studied climatology at the University of Bern. Prior to his entry into politics, he worked as an engineer in the private sector in Bern.

In 2009, Brunner was elected to the City Parliament of St. Gallen, where he remained until 2020. He sat on the infrastructure committee in this role. In the meantime, he unsuccessfully ran for the National Council in 2007, 2011, and 2015. In 2019, he was finally successful, his election considered a surprise by media outlets. After entering Parliament, he sat on the Science, Education and Culture Committee. He was also a member of WWF Switzerland and held various board seats on Responsible Business Initiatives. In May 2023, he announced he would not stand in October's federal election.

Thomas Brunner died on 15 May 2025, at the age of 64.
