= Jacques Nicolet (politician) =

Swiss politician (born 1965)

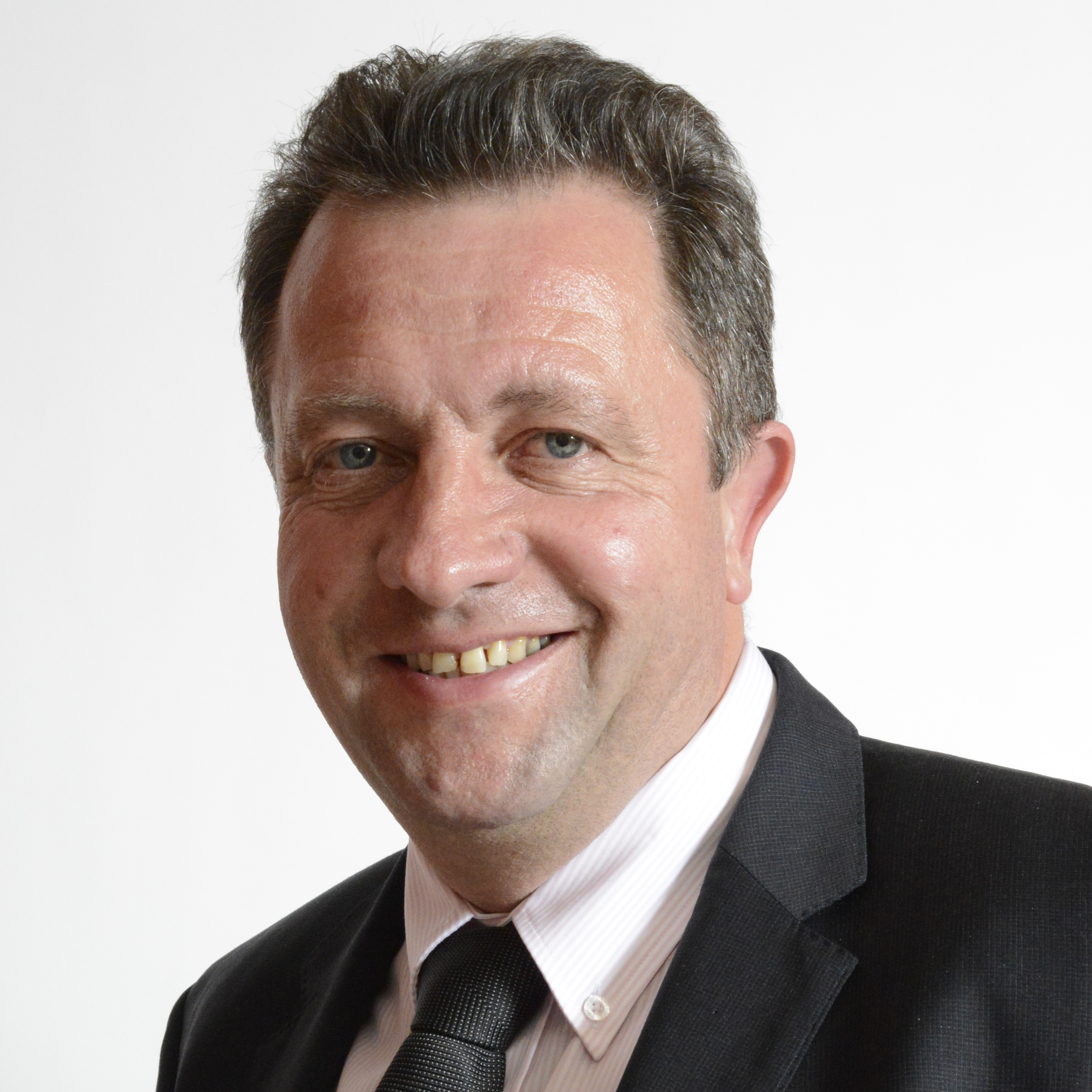
- Official portrait, 2019

Member of the National Council (Switzerland)
- Incumbent
- Assumed office 30 November 2015

Member of the Grand Council of Vaud
- In office 2008–2015

Personal details
- Born: Jacques Nicolet; 24 October 1965 (age 60) Lignerolle, Switzerland
- Party: Swiss People's Party
- Children: 4
- Occupation: Farmer, politician

Jacques Nicolet (born 24 October 1965) is a Swiss farmer and politician. He serves on the National Council (Switzerland) for the Swiss People's Party since 2015. Nicolet previously served as a member of the Grand Council of Vaud between 2008 and 2015. Between July 2014 and June 2015 he served as its president. During the 2017 French presidential election, Nicolet endorsed Marine Le Pen.
