= Franziska Ryser =

Swiss politician (born 1991)

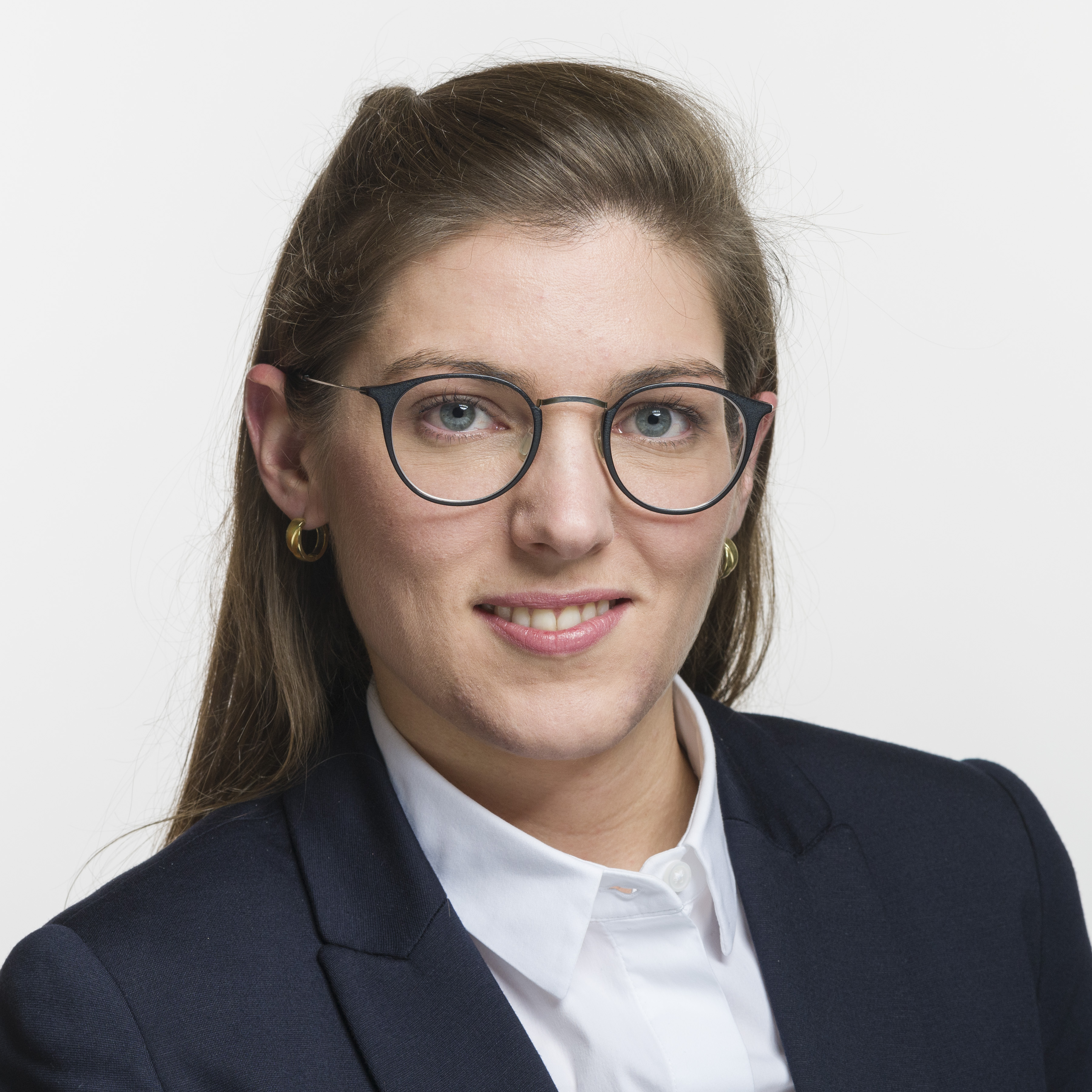
Franziska Ryser in 2019

Franziska Ryser (born 22 September 1991) is a Swiss politician who is a member of the Green Party of Switzerland. Ryser has served as a member of the National Council of Switzerland since December 2019 for the Canton of Saint-Gallen.

== Biography ==
Franziska Ryser was born on 22 September 1991 in Saint-Gallen. While she was originally from Basel and Niederönz, Ryser spent the majority of her youth in St. Gallen. After finishing her secondary studies, Ryser studied mechanical engineering at ETH Zurich. During her studies, Ryser worked at the Kellenberger & Co machine factory in Saint-Gallen and at Bühler in Uzwil. Upon graduation in 2016, Ryser worked at the Rehabilitation Engineering Lab at ETH Zurich in preparation for a doctorate degree as well as serving as a member of the board of directors for RyserOptik SA, her family's business.

In her spare time, Ryser likes to dance and act. During parliamentary sessions in Bern, Ryser lives in a shared apartment with fellow national councilors Andri Silberschmidt and Mike Egger.

== Political career ==
In 2013 at the age of 21, Ryser was elected to the local parliament for the City of Saint-Gallen. From 2013-2016, Ryser served on the education committee and in 2017 served on the real estate and construction committee in the local parliament. In 2017, Ryser also served as chairman of the communal parliament.

Since May 2019, Ryser has served as the co-president of the Green Party for St. Gallen and the surrounding area.

Ryser was elected to the National Council in the 2019 Swiss federal election. In June 2020, Ryser was named one of the vice-presidents of the Green Party.
