= Thomas Matter =

Swiss businessman, banker and politician

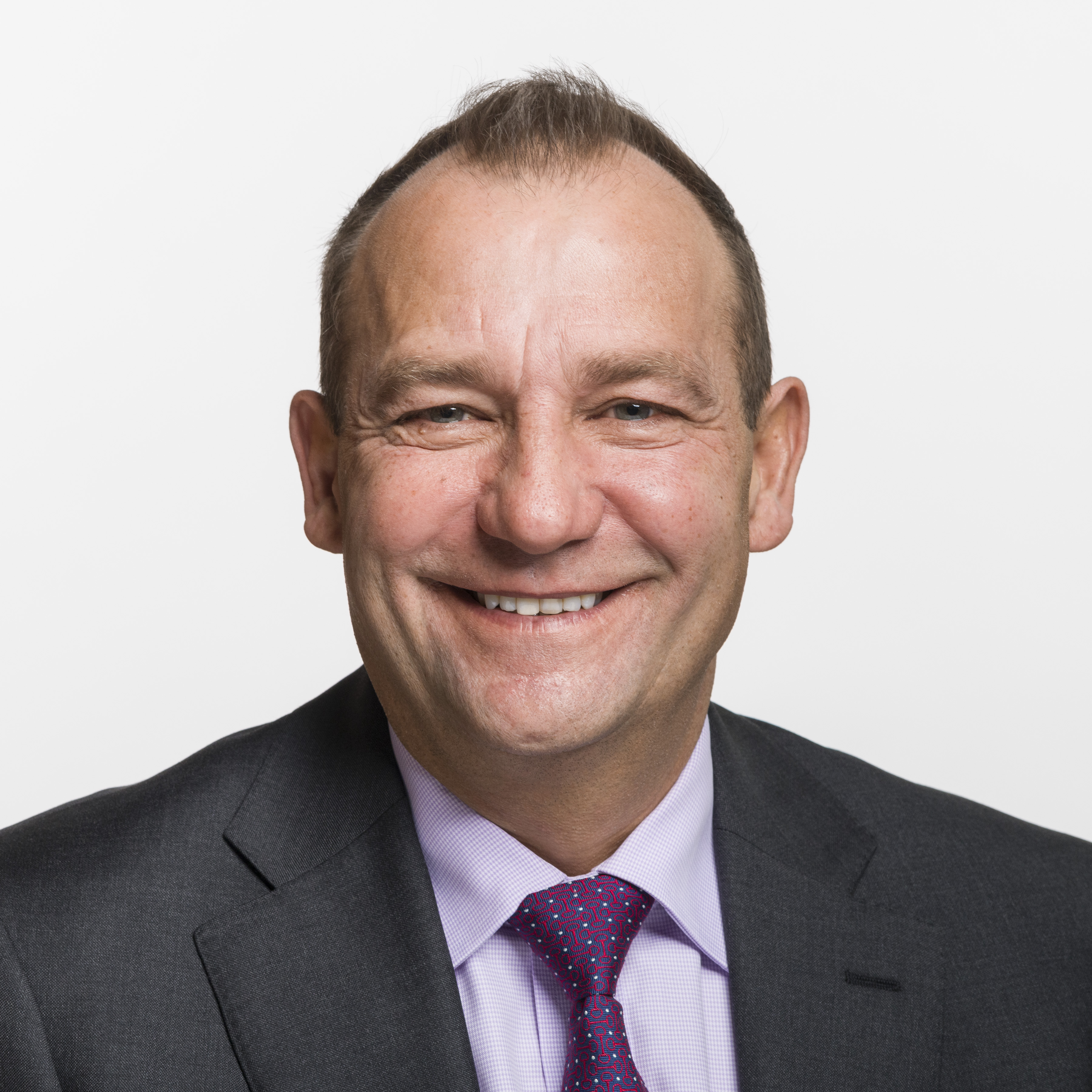
- Matter in 2014

Member of the National Council (Switzerland)
- Incumbent
- Assumed office 2 June 2014
- Preceded by: Christoph Blocher
- Constituency: Canton of Zürich

Personal details
- Born: Thomas Matter; 23 March 1966 (age 60) Liestal, Basel-Landschaft, Switzerland
- Party: Swiss People's Party
- Occupation: Businessman; banker; philanthropist; politician
- Website: thomasmatter.ch (in German)

Thomas Matter (born 23 March 1966) is a Swiss businessman, banker and politician. He currently serves as a member of the National Council (Switzerland) for the Swiss People's Party since 2014. Matter is estimated to be the second richest politician in the Swiss legislature with an estimated net worth of 150 million Swiss Francs (2017) by Handelszeitung.

== Early life and education ==
Matter was born 23 March 1966 in Liestal, Switzerland, the second of three sons of Peter Matter, who was Chief Treasurer at Hoffmann-La Roche, and belonged among a well situated circle which included Martin Ebner and Christoph Blocher. His father was also a board member of Ems-Chemie. His younger brother, Samuel Matter, is a partner of asset management company 2trade Group Ltd. in Zürich. His elder brother, Frank Matter (b. 1964), owns the film production company Soap Factory in Basel. His second cousin, Ruedi Matter, was the president of Swiss Radio and Television.

He was primarily raised in Sissach where he attended middle and high school. Subsequently, he completed a banking apprenticeship followed by a language exchange in the United States.

== Career ==
He initially worked in several banking positions, including Merrill Lynch in London. In 1994, he among other banking executives, founded Swissfirst Group, which he led as CEO until 2006. Matter sold his stake in the group, which was subsequently renamed Bellevue Group, in 2006 and subsequently resigned from management.

In 2005, Matter has founded Matter Group AG, which acts as his personal family office and primarily seeks participations in Swiss companies and supports SMEs. In 2010, it became public that Matter and his former business partner Daniel Hefti, were in the process of founding a new private bank. The Swiss Financial Market Supervisory Authority (FINMA) approved the banking license for Neue Helvetische Bank AG and it began operations in 2011. Now the bank is called Helvetische Bank AG and is primarily active in the field of corporate services to entrepreneurs and often referred to as 'entrepreneurial banking institute'.

Matter is on the board of directors of several companies, including MG Real Estate AG, MG Real Estate (Spain) AG, Matter Group AG, Helvetische Bank AG and Matter Beteiligungen AG (investments). He is a trustee of the foundation for bourgeois politics in Zug, on the advisory council of the Zurich Banking Association, Swiss Family Business Zürich and the No to the European Union Committee.

=== Philanthropy ===
Matter publicly stated that he is against development aid financed by the government through subventions. He is involved in several philanthropic endeavours, such as building an orphanage in Honduras.

== Politics ==
In 2012, Matter became the head of the treasury of the Swiss People's Party, and ally of Christoph Blocher. Blocher returned to National Council (Switzerland) after being outvoted of the Swiss Federal Council in 2007, on which he continued to serve until 2014. After his ultimate resignation, Matter took his seat in succession in the National Council (Switzerland) assuming office on 2 June 2014.

He currently also serves on the commission for economics and taxation and as deputy on the EU/EFTA delegation for the European Parliament.

== Personal life ==
Matter has been married to Marion Matter, who also serves on the Cantonal Council of Zürich for the Swiss People's Party, since 2023. They have one daughter and reside in Meilen, Switzerland. From a previous marriage with Isabelle (née Seiler) he has three daughters, she resides in nearby Küsnacht.
