= Michaël Buffat =

Swiss politician (born 1979)

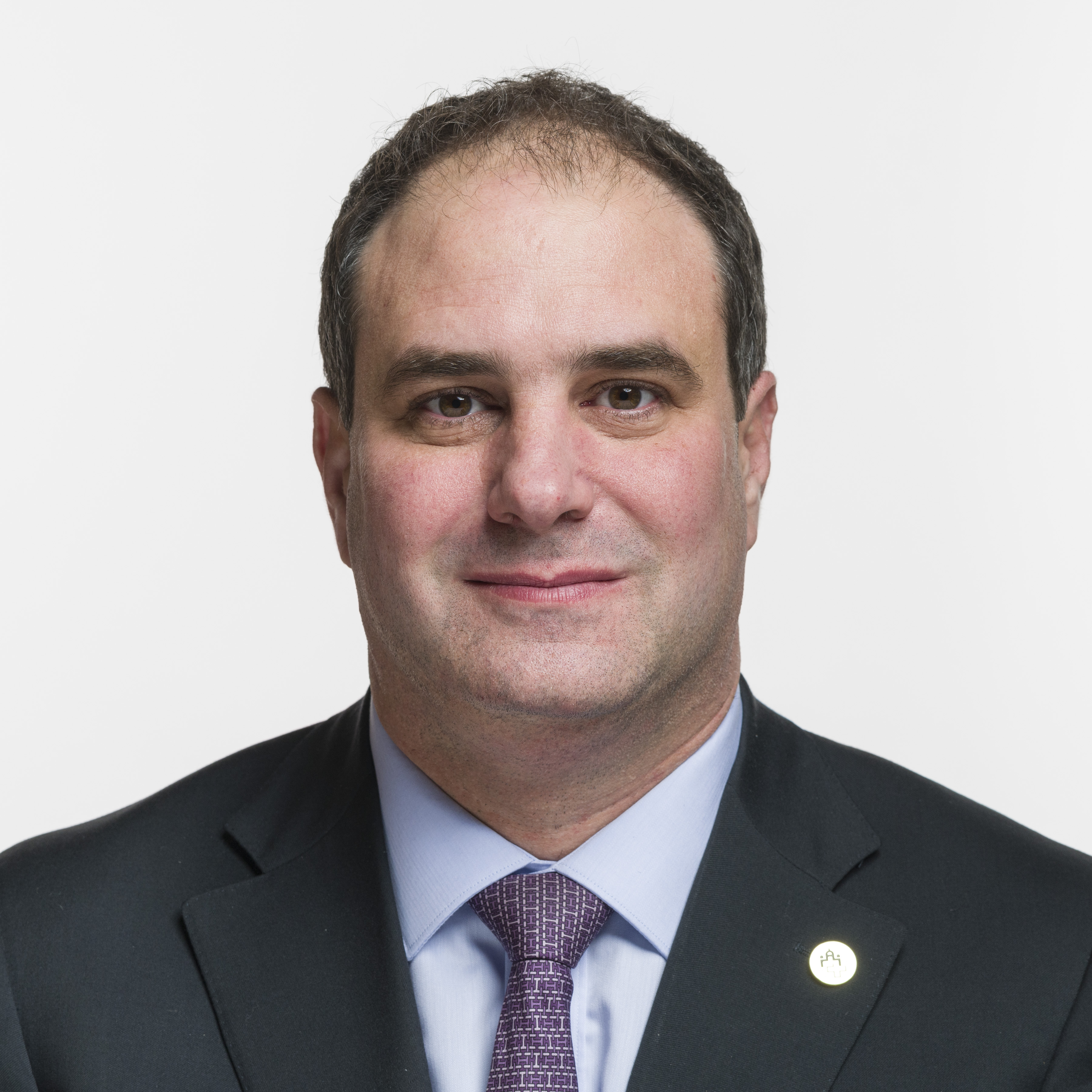

Member of the National Council (Switzerland)
- Incumbent
- Assumed office 30 November 2015
- Constituency: Canton of Vaud

Member of the Grand Council of Vaud
- In office 2007–2015

Personal details
- Born: Michaël Buffat; 27 September 1979 (age 46) Yverdon-les-Bains, Switzerland
- Party: Swiss People's Party
- Occupation: Farmer, politician

Michaël Buffat (born 27 September 1979) is a Swiss farmer and politician. He currently serves in the National Council (Switzerland) for the Swiss People's Party since 2015. He previously served on the Grand Council of Vaud from 2007 to 2015.
