= Lars Guggisberg =

Swiss attorney and politician

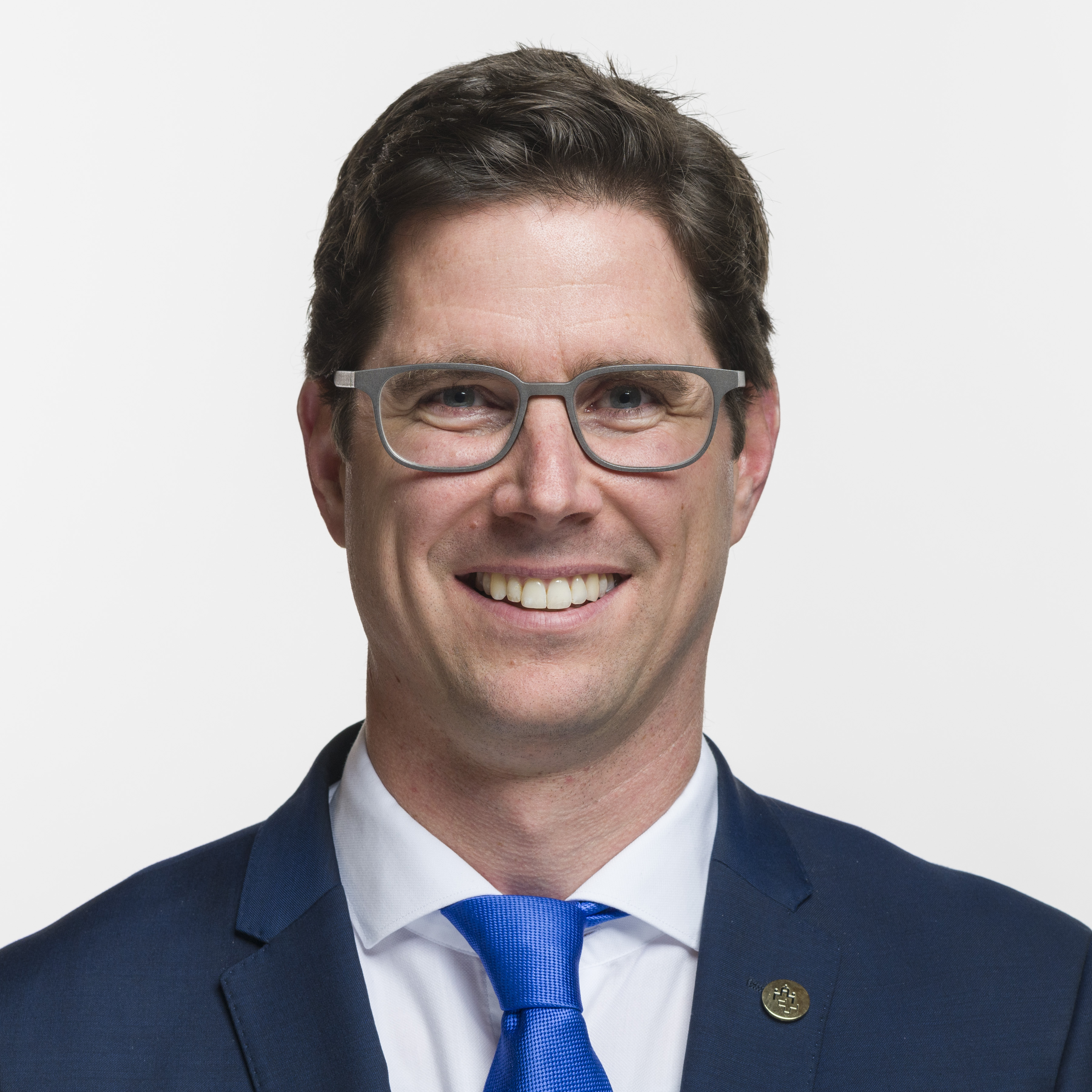
- Lars Guggisberg (2019)

Member of the National Council (Switzerland)
- Incumbent
- Assumed office 2 December 2019
- Preceded by: Werner Salzmann
- Constituency: Canton of Bern

Personal details
- Born: Lars Patrick Guggisberg; 19 July 1977 (age 49) Bern, Bern, Switzerland
- Party: Swiss People's Party
- Children: 2
- Website: larsguggisberg.ch (in German)

Military service
- Allegiance: Switzerland
- Branch/service: Swiss Armed Forces
- Rank: Private soldier

Lars Patrick Guggisberg (/ɡʊɡɡɪsbɛrɡ/ born 19 July 1977) is a Swiss attorney and politician. He currently serves as a member of the National Council (Switzerland) for the Swiss People's Party since 2019. He previously served three terms on the Grand Council of Bern.

== Early life and education ==
Guggisberg was born on 19 July 1977 in Bern, Switzerland. He was raised in farming family in Seftigen near Thun. He completed his Matura at Wirtschaftsgymnasium Bern-Neufeld in Bern before he studied law at the University of Bern between 1997 and 2002. In 2005, he was admitted to the Bar in the Canton of Bern. Since 2018, he also holds an Executive MBA from Fernfachhochschule Schweiz FFHS.

== Career ==
Until 2007, Guggisberg served as law clerk in the Administrative Court of Bern and then held positions at the Swiss Federal Office for Transport (BAV) and lectured at the Fernfachhochschule Schweiz FFHS in Commercial Law. Between 2014 and 2021, he was the section director of the Merchant and Industrial Association of Bern. Since June 2021, Guggisberg is an executive director of the Bernese Trade Association SME.

== Politics ==
Guggisberg served three terms on the Grand Council of Bern before ultimately being elected into National Council (Switzerland) in the 2019 Swiss federal election for the Swiss People's Party where he succeeded Werner Salzmann.

== Personal life ==
Guggisberg is married, has two children and resides in Kirchlindach.
