= Gabriela Suter =

Swiss politician (born 1972)

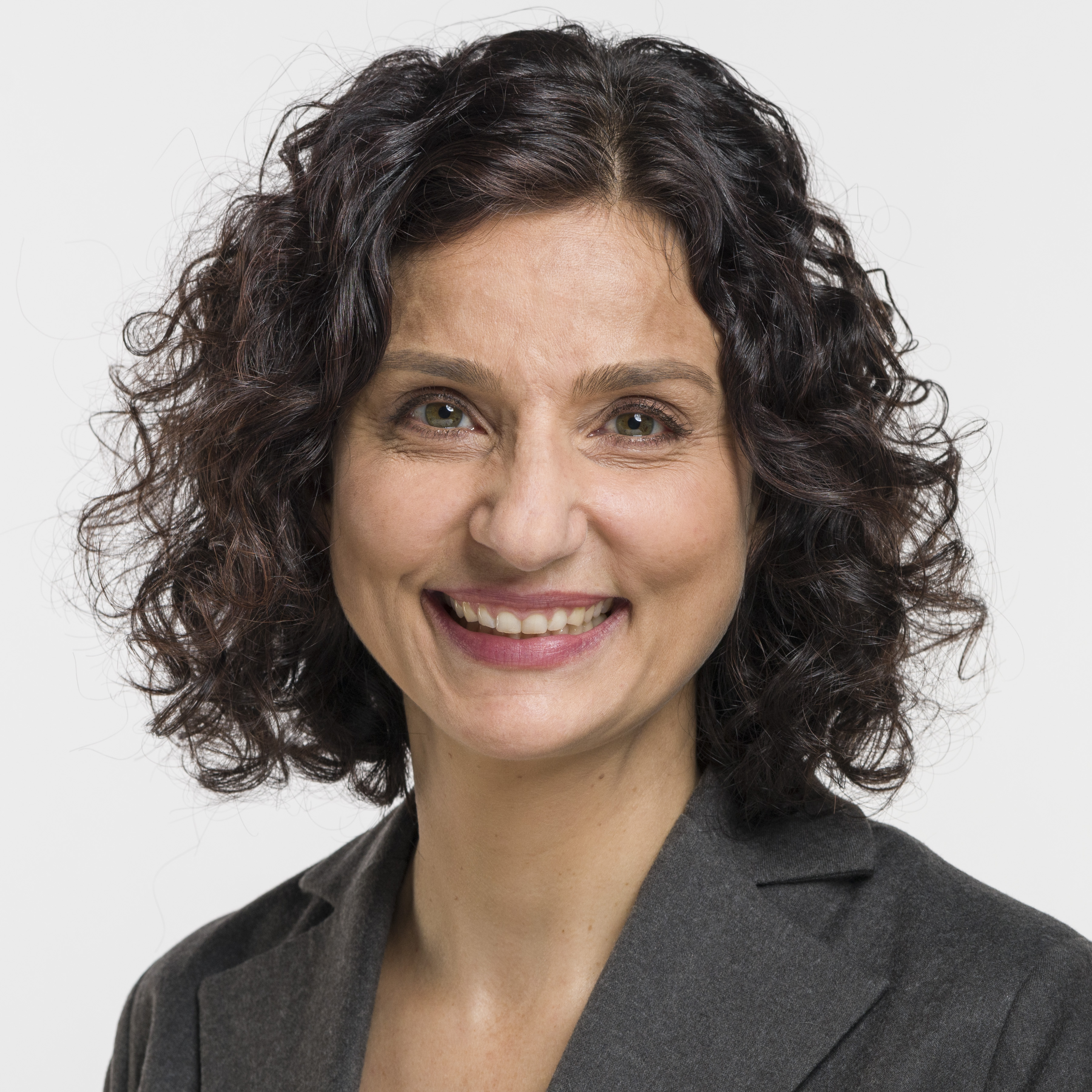
- Official portrait, 2019

Member of the National Council (Switzerland)
- Incumbent
- Assumed office 2 December 2019
- Constituency: Canton of Aargau

Personal details
- Born: Gabriela Suter; 12 December 1972 (age 53) Aarau, Aargau, Switzerland
- Children: 2
- Education: University of Zürich (Licentiate)
- Occupation: Teacher, non-profit executive, historian and politician
- Website: Official website

Gabriela Suter (born 12 December 1972) is a Swiss non-profit executive and politician. She currently serves as a member of the National Council (Switzerland) for the Social Democratic Party. She is also served as the president of the Aargau chapter of the Social Democratic Party until 2022. Suter previously also served as a member of the Grand Council of Aargau from 2017 to 2019.

== Early life and education ==
Suter was born 12 December 1972 in Aarau, Switzerland. She was primarily raised in the Lenzburg region where she attended the local schools. While completing her Matura, Suter spent one year in a student exchange in France. She graduated with a Licentiate in History and German Studies. She did also complete a certification to be a teacher. In 2017, she additionally received a master's degree in Public and Nonprofit Management.

== Career ==
While studying Suter worked as German teacher for asylum seekers as well as in retail in a small book store. After her graduation and being licensed, she worked as a high school teacher, at Alte Kantonsschule Aarau. Besides her political activities, Suter serves as vice president of Swissolar and as self-employed historian.

== Politics ==
Suter launched her political career while serving as a city councilor of Aarau between 2006 and 2017, where she was also a member on the naturalization commission between 2007 and 2013. Between 2017 and 2019 she served on the Grand Council of Aargau and was a member of the environment, building, traffic, energy and urban development commissions. In the 2019 Swiss federal election she was elected into National Council (Switzerland) where she assumed office on 2 December 2019.

== Personal life ==
Suter is in a partnership and has two children. They reside in Aarau.
