= Piero Marchesi =

Swiss businessman and politician

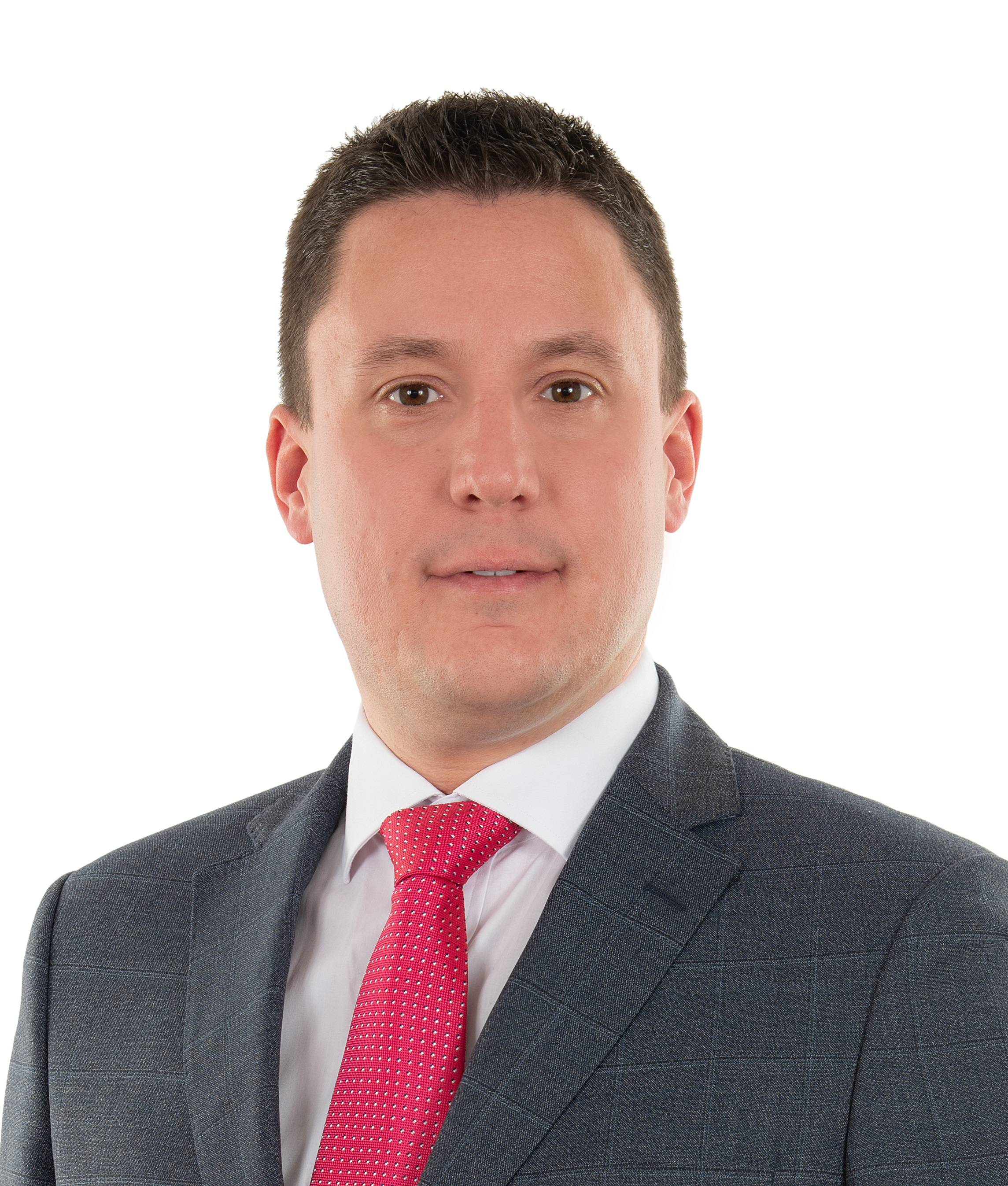
- Official portrait, 2019

Member of the National Council (Switzerland)
- Incumbent
- Assumed office 2 December 2019

Mayor of Tresa
- In office 2021

Personal details
- Born: 19 September 1981 (age 45) Monteggio, Switzerland
- Party: Swiss People's Party
- Children: 1
- Education: SUPSI (MBA)
- Website: Official website (in Italian)

Piero Marchesi (born 19 September 1981) is a Swiss businessman and politician. He currently serves as a member of the National Council (Switzerland) for the Swiss People's Party since 2019. He previously served on the municipal council and mayor of Monteggio. In 2019 he was elected into the Cantonal Council of Ticino but did not take office due to his success in the 2019 Swiss federal election. Since 2021, he additionally serves as mayor of Tresa.
