= Barbara Steinemann =

Swiss politician (born 1976)

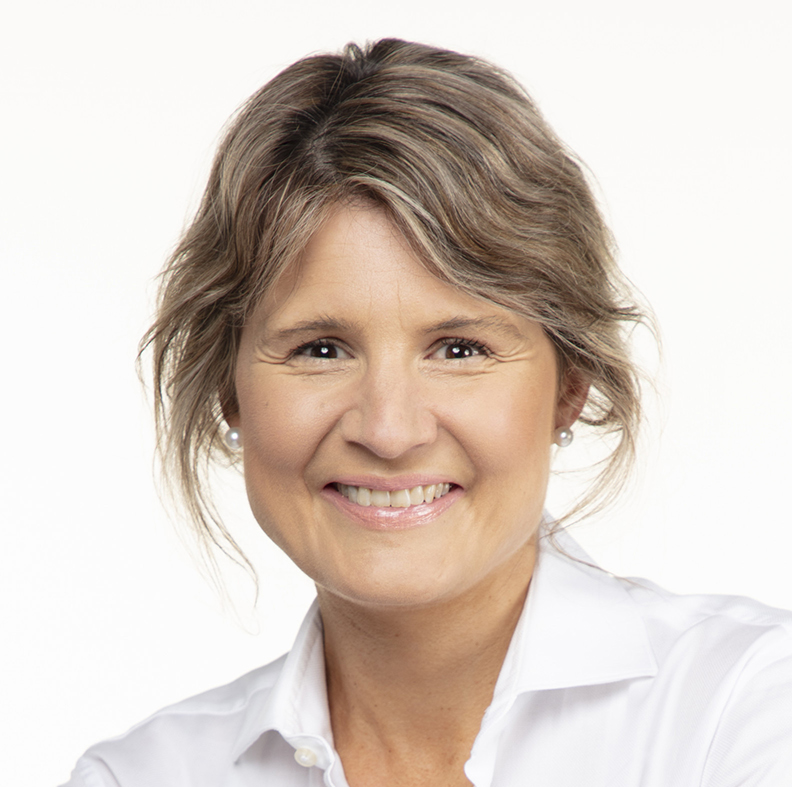
- Official portrait, 2019

Member of the National Council (Switzerland)
- Incumbent
- Assumed office 30 November 2015
- Constituency: Canton of Zürich

Member of the Cantonal Council of Zürich
- In office 2003–2015

Personal details
- Born: Barbara Steinemann; 18 June 1976 (age 49) Dielsdorf, Switzerland
- Occupation: Attorney, fiduciary and politician
- Website: Official website (in German)

Barbara Steinemann (born 18 June 1976) is a Swiss attorney, fiduciary and politician. She currently serves on the National Council (Switzerland) for the Swiss People's Party since 2015. She previously served on the Cantonal Council of Zürich from 2003 to 2015.
