= Manuel Strupler =

Swiss businessman and politician

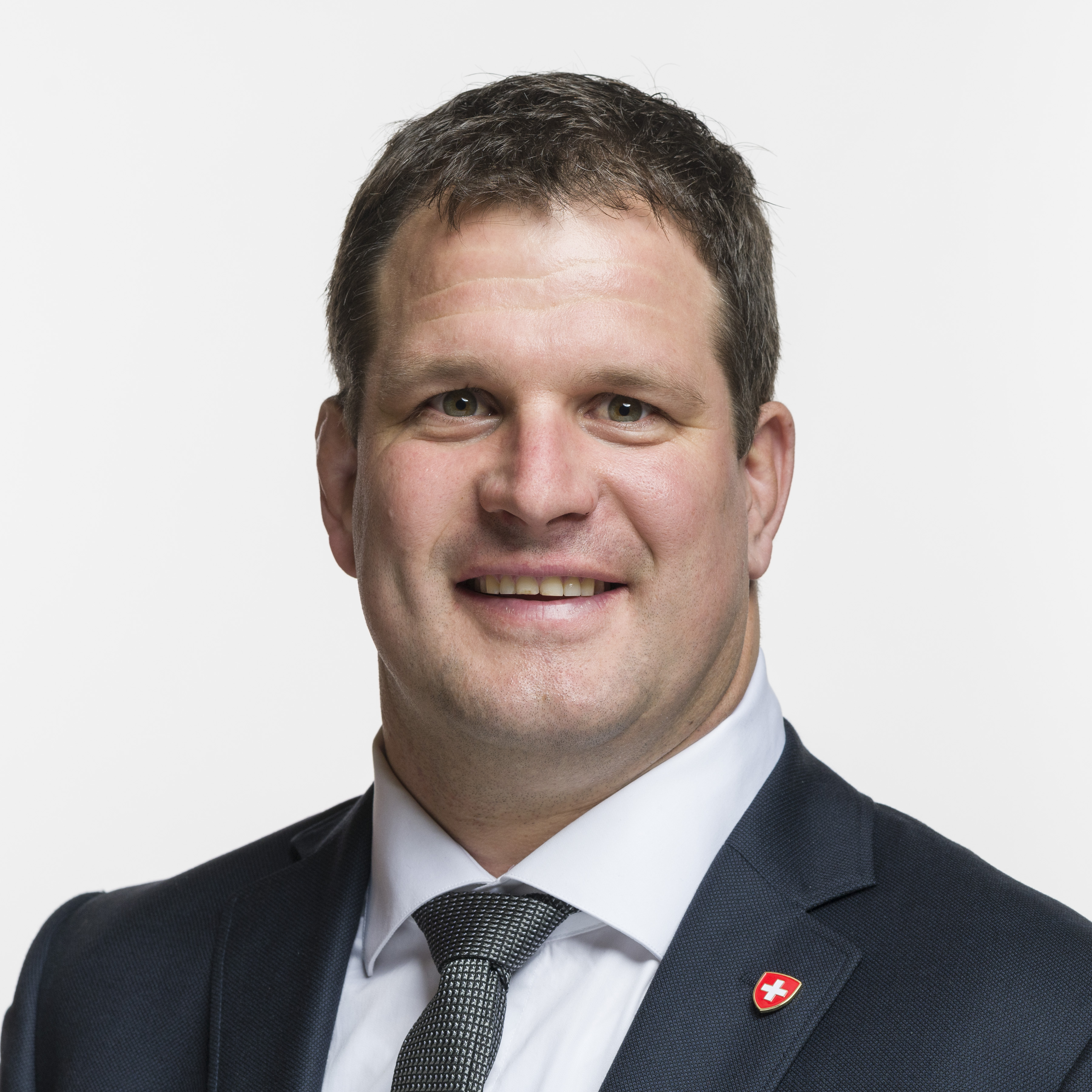
- Official portrait, 2019

Member of the National Council
- Incumbent
- Assumed office 2 December 2019

Personal details
- Born: Manuel Strupler; 12 April 1980 (age 46) Frauenfeld, Switzerland
- Occupation: Businessman, politician
- Website: Official website (in German)

Manuel Strupler (born 12 April 1980 in Frauenfeld) is a Swiss businessman and politician. He currently serves as member of the National Council for the Swiss People's Party since 2019. He previously served on the Grand Council of Thurgau from 2016 to 2020.
