= Hans-Peter Portmann =

Swiss politician (born 1963)

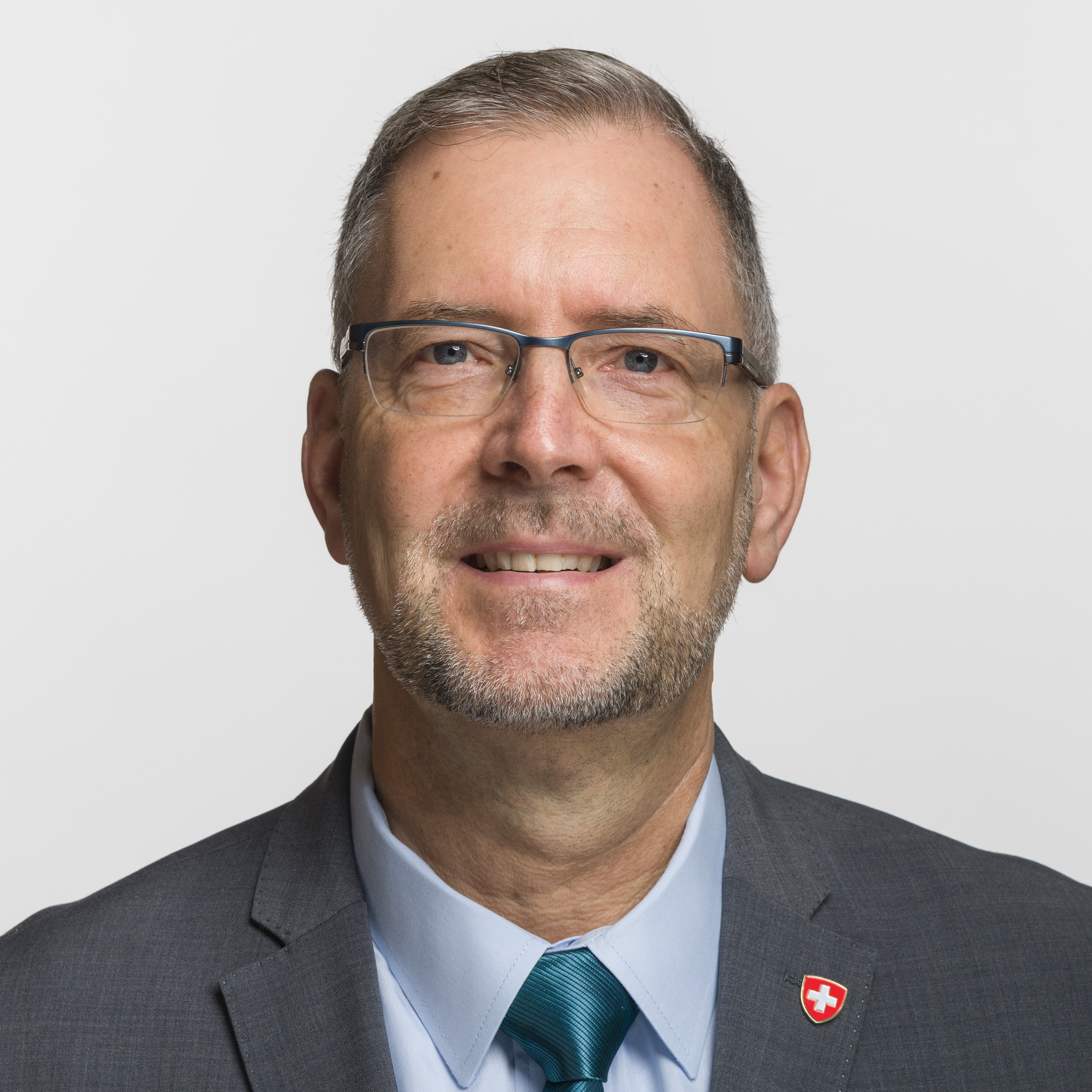
- Hans-Peter Portmann (2019)

Member of the National Council (Switzerland)
- Incumbent
- Assumed office 7 May 2014
- Preceded by: Filippo Leutenegger

Personal details
- Born: Hans-Peter Portmann; 22 February 1963 (age 63) Bülach, Zürich, Switzerland
- Education: International Business School (ZfU); Massachusetts Institute of Technology)
- Occupation: Banker, politician

Military service
- Allegiance: Switzerland
- Branch/service: Swiss Armed Forces
- Rank: Colonel

Hans-Peter Portmann (/pɒrtmɑːn/ born 22 February 1963) is a Swiss banking executive and politician. He currently serves as a member of the National Council (Switzerland) for The Liberals since 7 May 2015. Portmann is a member on the foreign policy commission as well as on the federal parliamentary delegation EU/EFTA. Between 1995 and 2014, he served as a member on the Cantonal Council of Zürich.

== Early life and education ==
Portmann was born 22 February 1963 in Bülach, Switzerland a suburb of Zürich. He completed a banking apprenticeship at the Union Bank of Switzerland (UBS), where he had several internal courses and trainings. Portmann completed an Executive MBA at International Business School (ZfU) in Zürich, which was a joint-degree program with the Massachusetts Institute of Technology (MIT) in Cambridge, Massachusetts, and other leading business schools in the US. He completed his diploma thesis Requirements in Change in Wealth Management under the lecture of Prof. Dr. Rolf Kiechl, a professor at University of Zurich, and graduated with honors designation magna cum laude.

== Career ==
Between 1980 and 1983, Portmann completed a commercial apprenticeship at UBS in Zürich, followed by an internship at Brown Brothers Harriman & Co in New York. In 1983, he became a junior trader at the Morgan Guaranty Trust (today part of JPMorgan Chase), a position he held until 1985. After his return to Zurich, he became a currency trader, at Wirtschafts und Privatbank Zurich (today part of EFG Bank von Ernst) responsible for the corporate desk as well as commodities trading as well as advisory of wealth management clientele. In 1987, he briefly worked as trader in London. From 1990 to 2001, he held several positions in commodities trading at Banca del Gottardo and Finter Bank in Zurich. From 2001 and 2003, Portmann was the head of STG Asset Management, where he was responsible for the Zurich branch.

Since 2003, he is a director of LGT (Switzerland) AG in Zürich (after STG was taken-over by the Liechtenstein banking house). He is currently responsible for the wealth management of the Swiss market. He is president of the Lighthouse foundation as well as vice president of the Zurich Banking Association. He is also president of the board of trustees of Fondazione Kaspar e Sophie Spörri in Gudo (Ticino).

== Politics ==
Portmann was a member of the Cantonal Council of Zurich from 1995 to 2014, where he was president of the audit commission for education and science as well as a substitute member of the economics commission. He was elected in the National Council (Switzerland) for The Liberals in the 2015 Swiss federal election, assuming office on 7 May 2015, succeeding Filippo Leutenegger.

== Personal life ==
Portmann is openly gay and is in a registered partnership. He resides in Rüschlikon, Switzerland.
