= Stefanie Heimgartner =

Swiss politician (born 1987)

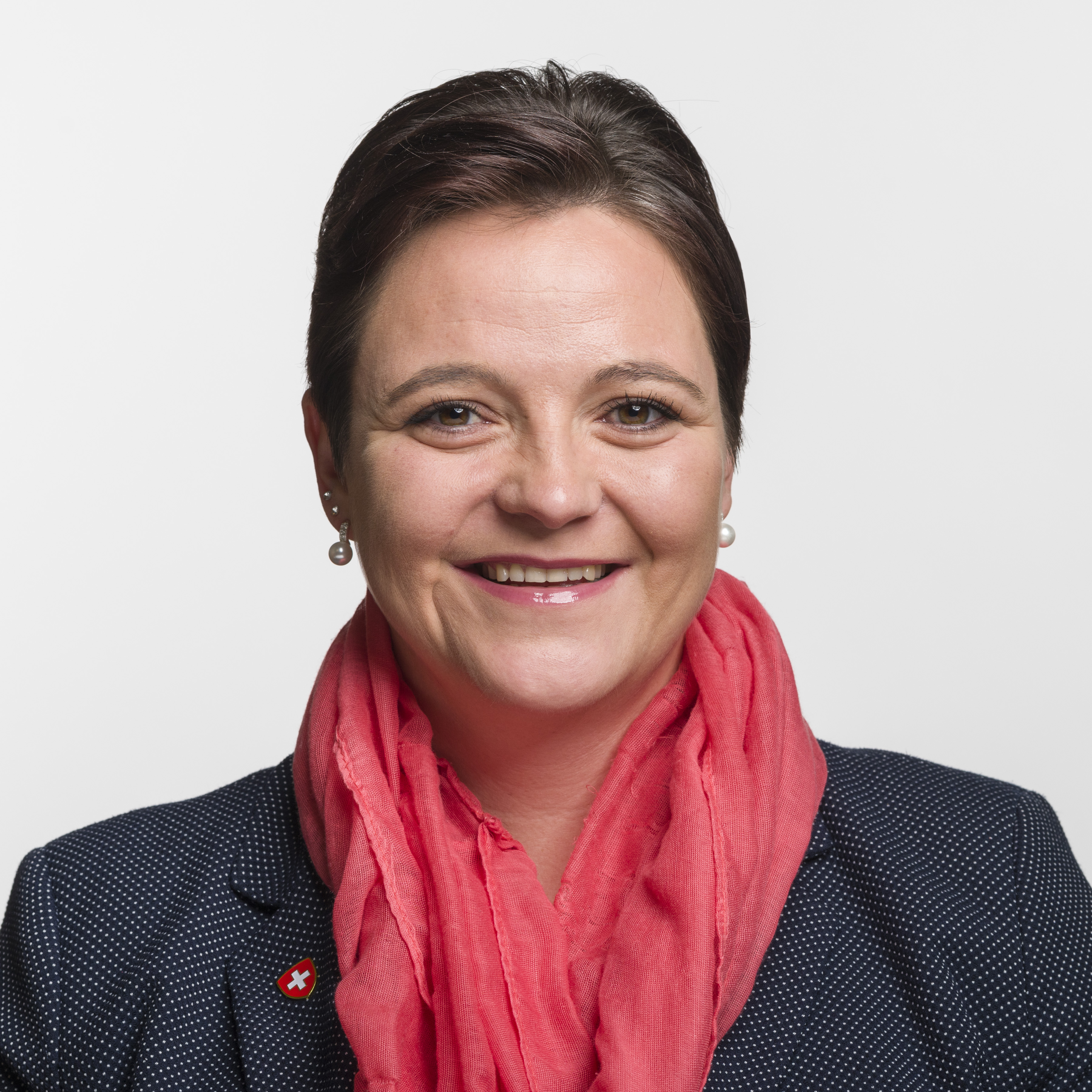
- Stefanie Heimgartner (2019)

Member of the National Council
- Incumbent
- Assumed office 2 December 2019

Personal details
- Born: 25 April 1987 (age 38) Baden, Aargau, Switzerland
- Party: Swiss People's Party
- Website: stefanie-heimgartner.ch (in German)

Military service
- Branch/service: Swiss Armed Forces
- Rank: Soldier

Stefanie Heimgartner (born 25 April 1987) is a Swiss businesswoman and politician. She currently serves as a member of the National Council (Switzerland) for the Swiss People's Party since 2019.

== Early life and education ==
Stefanie Heimgartner was born 25 April 1987 in Baden, Switzerland. She has one sister. In her youth, she engaged as a handball player in various associations. She completed a commercial apprenticeship in Business administration. She also holds a truck driver's license and is certified to operate them commercially.

== Professional career ==
She works in the logistics and transportation company of her parents, Heimgartner Transport AG, of which she is a part-owner. Further she is an executive director of Verein Lernwerk in Gebensdorf, which engages in workplace integration for people with disabilities. She is a member of the board of trustees of the Stiftung zur Förderung und Unterstützung des Kinderheims Brugg (en. Foundation for the Development and Support of the Orphanage Brugg).

== Personal life ==
Heimgartner resides in Baden, Switzerland.

In the Swiss Armed Forces, Heimgartner is enlisted as Soldier.
