= Sandra Sollberger-Muff =

Swiss businesswoman and politician

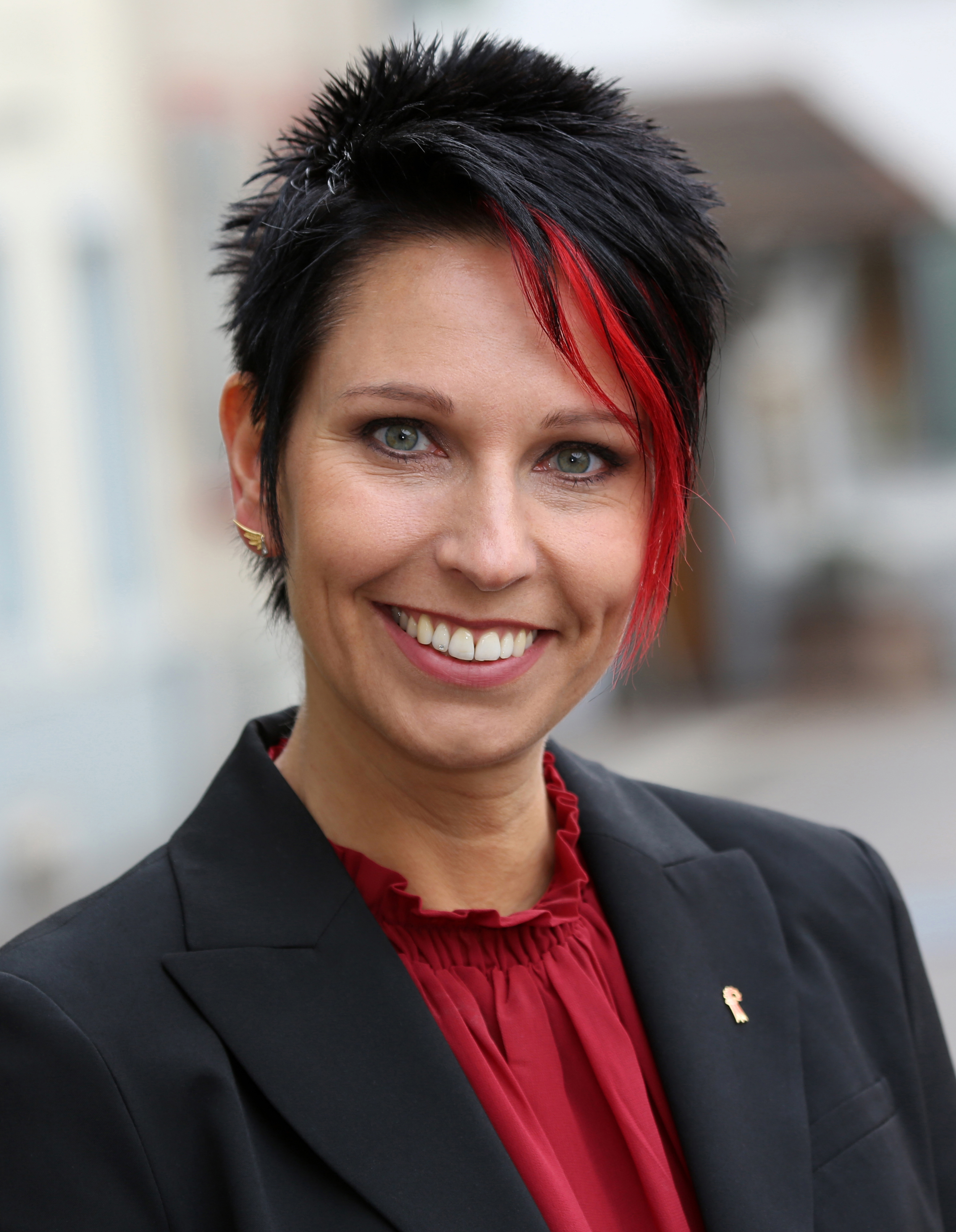
- Sandra Sollberger-Muff (2019)

Member of the National Council (Switzerland)
- Incumbent
- Assumed office 30 November 2015
- Constituency: Canton of Basel-Landschaft

Personal details
- Born: Sandra Muff; 27 October 1973 (age 52) Zofingen, Aargau, Switzerland
- Party: Swiss People's Party
- Spouse: Simeon Sollberger (m. 1996)
- Children: 2
- Profession: Businesswoman, politician
- Website: sandrasollberger.ch (in German)

Sandra Sollberger-Muff officially Sandra Sollberger (/sɒllbɛrɡɛr/ née Muff; born 27 October 1973 in Zofingen) is a Swiss businesswoman and politician. She currently serves as a member of National Council (Switzerland) for the Swiss People's Party since 30 November 2015.

== Early life and education ==
Sollberger was born 27 October 1973 in Zofingen, Switzerland to Anton and Katharina (née Müller) Muff. Her parents owned a painting business. She grew up partially in Zofingen and in nearby Reiden. She completed a painter apprenticeship in Oftringen and graduated with honors in 1992. In 1996, she completed the Meisterbrief in painting in Olten, Switzerland.

== Career ==
Since 1997, Sollberger has been employed as an administrative officer in the painters company of her husband, Sollberger Maler AG (en. Sollberger Painters Corp.)

== Politics ==
Sollberger began her political career on the municipal level, as a member of the communal council of Bubendorf, where she served from 2008 to 2016. Since 2009, she has been in the management of the Swiss People's Party Basel-Landschaft.

Between July 1, 2011, and November 6, 2015, Sollberger has been a member of the Cantonal Council of Basel-Landschaft, where she was a member of the planning and zoning commission. In the 2015 Swiss federal election, she was elected as a member of the National Council (Switzerland) for the Swiss People's Party, assuming office on 30 November 2015.

== Personal life ==
Since 1996, Sollberger is married to Simeon Sollberger, and resides in Liestal. They have two children; Florence (b. 1997) and Fabrice (b. 2000).
