= David Zuberbühler =

Swiss businessman and politician (born 1979)

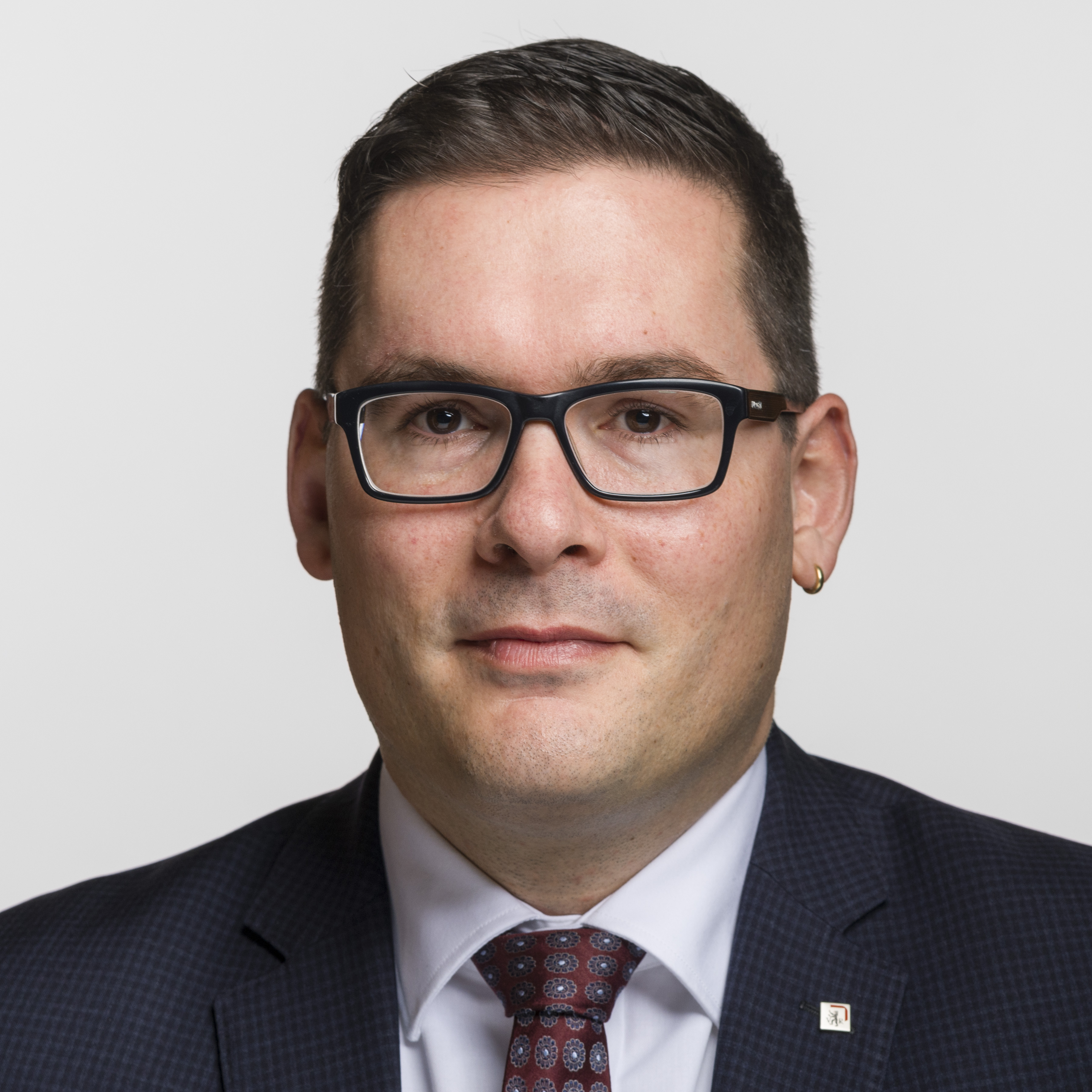
- David Zuberbühler (2019)

Member of the National Council (Switzerland)
- Incumbent
- Assumed office 30 November 2015
- Preceded by: Andrea Caroni
- Constituency: Appenzell Ausserrhoden

Personal details
- Born: February 20, 1979 (age 47) Herisau, Appenzell Ausserrhoden, Switzerland
- Party: Swiss People's Party
- Spouse: Yasmine Preisig
- Children: 2
- Occupation: Businessman, politician
- Website: david-zuberbühler.ch (in German)

Military service
- Allegiance: Switzerland
- Branch/service: Swiss Armed Forces
- Rank: Quartermaster sergeant (Fourier aD)

David Zuberbühler (born 20 February 1979) is a Swiss businessman and politician. He currently serves as a member of the National Council for the Swiss People's Party since 2015. He previously served on the Cantonal Council of Appenzell Ausserrhoden from 2011 to 2016.

== Early life and education ==
Zuberbühler was born on 20 February 1979 in Herisau, Switzerland, where he also grew up and attended the local schools.

== Career ==
He was born into an entrepreneurial family that owns two shoe store businesses, including Hälg Markenschuhe AG (Hälg Brand Shoes) and zubischuhe.ch AG, in the third generation. He is currently in the management of both companies.

== Politics ==
In 1999, Zuberbühler was among the founders of the Young Swiss People's Party in Appenzell Ausserrhoden. In the same year he joined the municipal party alliance and was subsequently elected into the municipal council of Herisau as the youngest member aged 19/20. He served there until 2011 and presided over the Finance commission. Between 2011 and 2016, he served as a member of the Cantonal Council of Appenzell Ausserrhoden.

In the 2015 Swiss federal election, Zuberbühler was ultimately elected to National Council for the Swiss People's Party. He is a member on the security commission as well as the delegation for the relations to the Landtag of Liechtenstein. He is also a member of the parliamentary group Independent Weapon Rights.

== Personal life ==
Zuberbühler is married to Yasmine (née Preisig) and they have two children; Marc (b. 2005) and Nico (b. 2007).
