= Thomas Rechsteiner =

Swiss politician

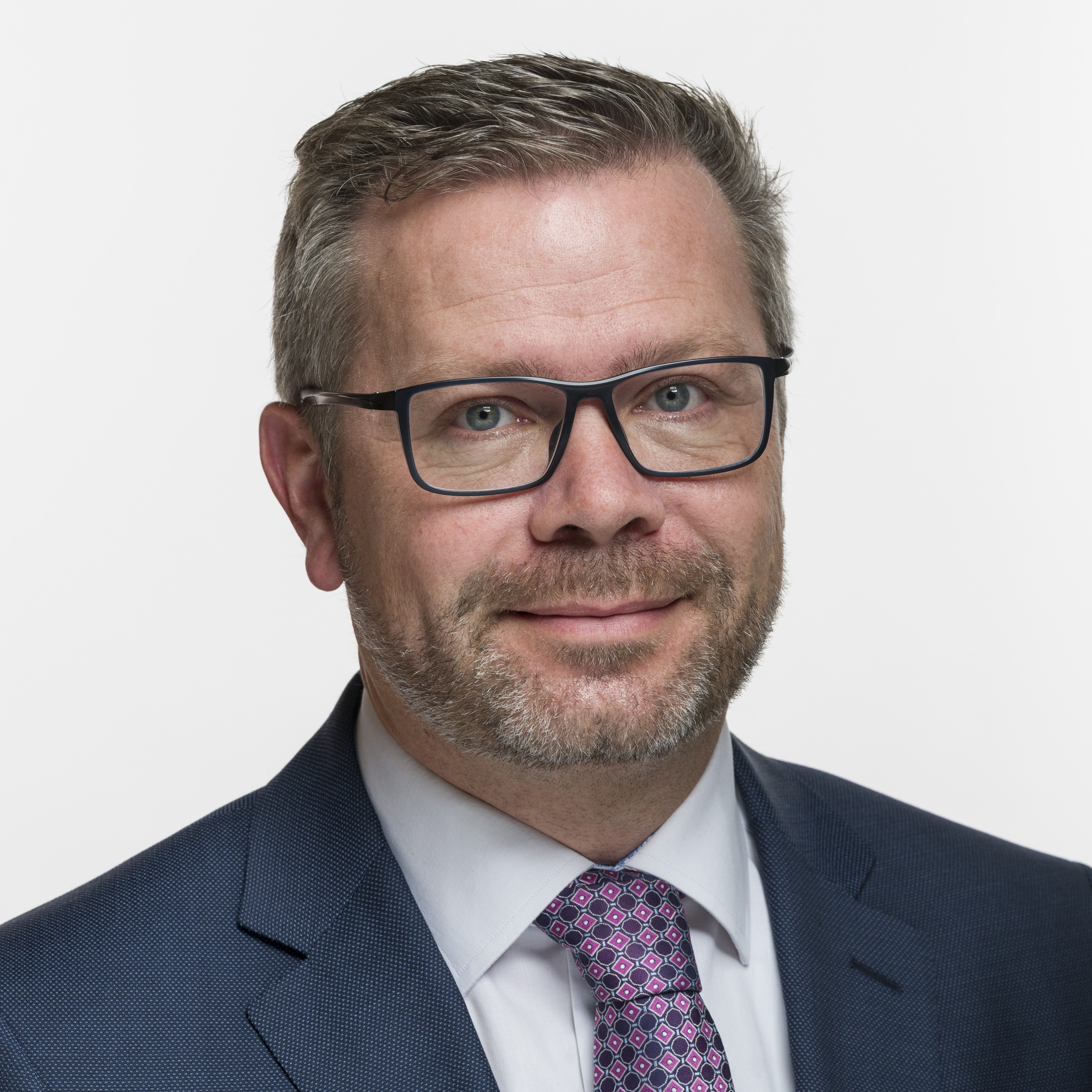
- Thomas Rechsteiner in 2019

Member of the National Council of Switzerland
- Incumbent
- Assumed office 2019

Personal details
- Born: November 14, 1971 (age 54) Appenzell, Switzerland
- Party: The Centre (formerly CVP)
- Education: Trained insurance specialist and financial planner
- Website: Website

Thomas Rechsteiner (born November 14, 1971 in Appenzell) is a Swiss politician from The Centre, formerly the Christian Democratic Party (CVP). He has been a member of the National Council of Switzerland from 2019.

== Politics ==
Thomas Rechsteiner initially served as a school councilor and later in the Grosser Rat, the legislative body of the Canton of Appenzell Innerrhoden. From 2011 to 2018, he was the Säckelmeister (Finance Director) in the cantonal government. In the national elections of October 20, 2019, Rechsteiner was elected to the National Council for the CVP. Rechsteiner prevailed over Antonia Fässler, the official CVP candidate. He was re-elected in 2023.

In the National Council, Rechsteiner is a member of the Security Policy Committee and Vice President of the Delegation for Relations with the Parliament of Liechtenstein.
