= Esther Friedli =

Swiss politician (born 1977)

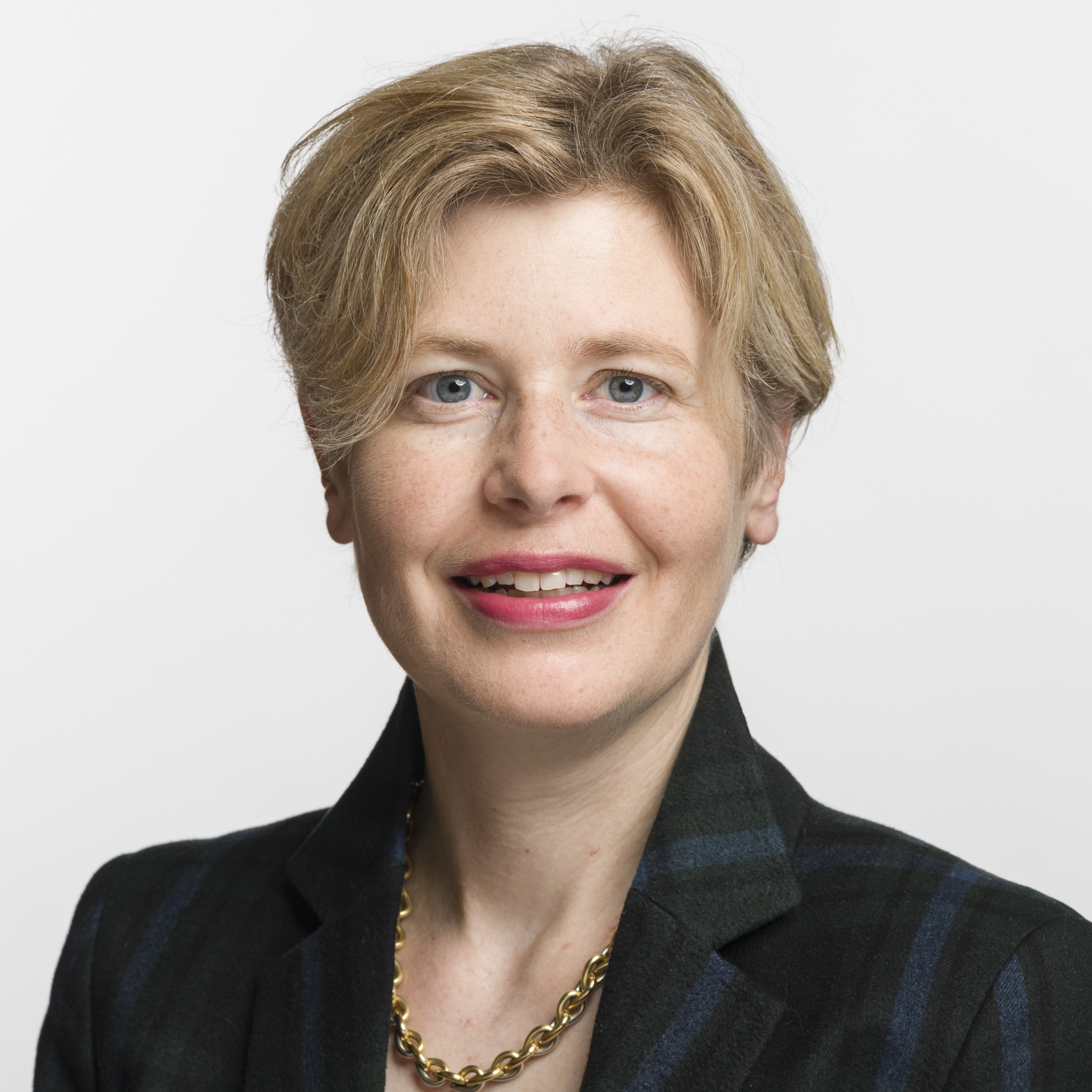
- Esther Friedli (2019)

Member of the Council of States (Switzerland)
- Incumbent
- Assumed office 30 May 2023
- Preceded by: Paul Rechsteiner
- Constituency: Canton of St. Gallen

Member of the National Council (Switzerland)
- In office 2 December 2019 – 29 May 2023

Personal details
- Born: Esther Barbara Friedli; 4 June 1977 (age 49) Bern, Switzerland
- Party: Swiss People's Party
- Other political affiliations: Christian Democratic People's Party (1995-2016)
- Spouse: Toni Brunner (m. 2024)
- Education: University of Bern; Aarhus University
- Occupation: Politician, political strategist, consultant
- Website: esther-friedli.ch (in German)

Esther Barbara Friedli (/frɪdlɪ/ born 4 June 1977) is a Swiss politician who currently serves on the Council of States (Switzerland) on 30 April 2023 and assumed office on 30 May 2023. She previously served on the National Council (Switzerland) for the Swiss People's Party since 2019. She is the domestic partner of Toni Brunner, former president of the Swiss People's Party and also a member of the National Council. Between 2008 and 2014, Friedli served as the secretary general of the Department of Education of the Canton of St. Gallen.

== Early life and education ==
Friedli was born 4 June 1977 in Bern, Switzerland. She grew-up in nearby Worb, where she attended public schools. Between 1997 and 2003 she studied Political Science at the University of Bern. She took minors in Constitutional Law, National Economics and Media Studies. Friedli also completed a student exchange at Aarhus University in Aarhus, Denmark in 2001. While growing up she had been an active member of the Christian Democratic People's Party and engaged in their youth commission.

== Career ==
She completed a Federal Palace of Switzerland internship at the executive office of Federal councilor Ruth Metzler in the early 2000s. After completing her studies in Political Science, she initially worked in Public Relations, for Mediapolis and then as a consultant for Farner Consulting AG, one of Switzerland's leading consulting companies. Between 2008 and 2014 she served six years as the secretary general of the Department of Education in St. Gallen. Since 2015 she works as an independent consultant for her firm polestica gmbh which is primarily active in the field of political consulting and communication. Toni Brunner is a partner in this firm. They also own and operate Landgasthaus Sonne a family-style restaurant. With her consulting firm she led several political campaigns, such as for Roger Köppel, publisher of Weltwoche.

== Politics ==
Friedli campaigned for a seat in the Cantonal Council of St. Gallen in 2016, after becoming a member of the Swiss People's Party, before she was affiliated with the Christian Democratic People's Party. In the 2019 Swiss federal election, Friedli was elected into National Council (Switzerland) receiving 35,540 votes. According to her own statements, the campaign to be elected cost her only 5,000 Swiss Francs.

In 2022, Friedli was briefly traded as potential successor to Ueli Maurer, in the Federal Council of Switzerland. Later she did confirm that she didn't want to run for office, and the position was ultimately given to Albert Rösti. On 14 October 2022, she instead announced to run for member of the Council of States (Switzerland). Her campaign will be entirely financed by fellow National Councilor Magdalena Martullo-Blocher.

== Personal life ==
In May 2024, Friedli married her long-term partner, Toni Brunner in Wattwil, Switzerland. They reside in Ebnat-Kappel in St. Gallen. The couple has no children.
