= 2011 Zürich cantonal elections =

← 2007	3 April 2011	2015 →

All 7 seats in the Executive Council of Zürich All 180 seats in the Cantonal Council of Zürich (91 seats needed for a majority)
- Executive Council
	First party	Second party
Party	Social Democrats	FDP.The Liberals
Elected	Mario Fehr; 137,035, 81.54%	Thomas Heiniger; 134,061, 79.77%
	Regine Aeppli; 121,144, 72.08%	Ursula Gut-Winterberger; 123,349, 76.96%
	Third party	Fourth party
Party	Swiss People's	Greens
Elected	Ernst Stocker; 129,943, 77.32%	Martin Graf; 120,815, 71.88%
	Markus Kägi; 123,159, 73.28%
- Cantonal Council
Party	Vote %	Seats	+/–
Swiss People's	29.63%	54	−2
Social Democrats	19.32%	35	−1
FDP.The Liberals	12.93%	23	−6
Greens	10.57%	19	0
Green Liberals	10.27%	19	+9
Christian Democrats	4.86%	9	−4
Evangelical People's	3.78%	7	−3
BDP	3.47%	6	New
Federal Democrats	2.57%	5	0
Alternative List	1.63%	3	+1
This lists parties that won seats. See the complete results below.

The 2011 Zürich cantonal elections were held on 3 April 2011, to elect the seven members of the cantonal Executive Council and the 180 members of the Cantonal Council.

The Green Party gained a seat on the Executive Council but the FDP-SVP coalition retained a majority of four seats. In the Cantonal Council, the SVP retained a plurality but no alliance reached an overall majority.

== Electoral system ==
=== Executive Council ===
The Executive Council contains 7 members elected using a two-round majoritarian system. In the first round, electors have up to seven votes and the 7 most-voted candidates reaching an overall majority (>50%) are elected. If seats remain to be filled, a runoff is held where electors have as many votes as seats remaining, and the candidates with the most votes (simple plurality) are elected.

=== Cantonal Council ===
The Cantonal Council is elected using open-list proportional representation, with canton-wide apportionment of seats and allocation into 18 constituencies (biproportional apportionment). In each constituency, voters have as many votes as there are seats to fill (panachage is permitted); these votes each count both for the candidate and for the list they stand in. These votes counts are divided by the seats count to give fictional electors counts which can be summed up fairly throughout the canton.

Using the fictional electors counts, each party above the threshold (reaching 5% in at least one constituency) is apportioned seats canton-wide, which are then shared among their constituency lists. In each constituency list, the seats are attributed to the candidates reaching the most votes.

== Candidates ==
=== Executive Council ===
Six of the seven incumbent councillors Ursula Gut (FDP), Hans Hollenstein (CVP), Thomas Heiniger (FDP), Regine Aeppli (SP), Markus Kägi (SVP), and Ernst Stocker (SVP, elected in a by-election in 2009) ran for re-election.

Incumbent Social Democratic executive councillor Markus Notter retired, with national councillor Mario Fehr running to hold the open seat.

The Greens fielded again Illnau-Effretikon mayor Martin Graf, who had reached an overall majority four years earlier but had failed to reach the top seven candidates needed to be elected. The EVP ran with national councillor Maja Ingold, while the Green-Liberals did not run any candidate for the executive council.

=== Cantonal Council ===
The table below lists contesting parties represented in the Cantonal Council before the election.

Name		Ideology	2007 result	
Name		Ideology	Votes (%)	Seats
SVP	Swiss People's Party; Schweizerische Volkspartei	National conservatism Right-wing populism	30.5%	56 / 180
SP	Social Democratic Party; Sozialdemokratische Partei	Social democracy Democratic socialism	19.5%	36 / 180
FDP	FDP.The Liberals (Note: Formerly the Free Democratic Party); FDP.Die Liberalen	Liberalism; Conservative liberalism	16.0%	29 / 180
GPS	Green Party; Grüne Partei	Green politics Progressivism	10.5%	19 / 180
CVP	Christian Democratic People's Party; Christlichdemokratische Volkspartei	Christian democracy Social conservatism	7.3%	13 / 180
GLP	Green Liberal Party; Grünliberale Partei	Green liberalism Social liberalism	5.8%	10 / 180
EVP	Evangelical People's Party; Evangelische Volkspartei	Christian democracy Social conservatism	5.2%	10 / 180
EDU	Federal Democratic Union; Eidgenössisch-Demokratische Union	National conservatism	2.8%	5 / 180
AL	Alternative List; Alternative Liste	Socialism	0.9%	2 / 180

The Swiss Democrats also ran after having lost their seats in 2007. Three new parties contested this election: the Conservative Democratic Party (BDP, who seceded from the SVP in 2008), the European Reform Party (ERP), and the Pirate Party (PP), meaning a total of 13 parties ran in this election.

== Results ==
=== Executive Council ===
Note: percentages here are calculated based on the number of valid votes (excluding blank and invalid votes) so that the absolute majority is at exactly 50%, but may result in candidates reaching over 100% of the valid votes.

Results of the 2011 Zürich Executive Council election
Candidate	Party	Votes	%
Mario Fehr	SP	137,035	81.54
Thomas Heiniger	FDP	134,061	79.77
Ernst Stocker	SVP	129,943	77.32
Ursula Gut-Winterberger	FDP	129,349	76.96
Markus Kägi	SVP	123,159	73.28
Regine Aeppli	SP	121,144	72.08
Martin Graf	Grüne	120,815	71.88
Hans Hollenstein	CVP	118,487	70.50
Maja Ingold	EVP	68,996	41.05
Scattered votes		93,485	55.62
Total		1,176,474	61.51
Blank and invalid votes		736,318	38.49
Total votes		1,912,792	7×
Valid ballots		273,256	96.26
Invalid ballots		10,626	3.74
Total ballots		283,882	–
Registered voters/Turnout		855,243	33.19
Source: statistik.zh.ch

The results were a major upset and surprise as CVP candidate Hans Hollenstein fall from second to eighth, losing his seat to Green candidate Martin Graf by only two thousand votes, despite the polls predicting Hollenstein would finish in the top 3 candidates.

New candidate Mario Fehr gained a seat (retaining 2 seats for the SP) and topped the polls with over 81% of the votes by gaining votes from the bourgeois camp voters. FDP candidates saw their scores decrease slightly while the SVP gained slightly in votes.

The elections saw a high amount of consensus, as all elected candidates were voted on at least 44% of the ballots; Hollenstein's defeat was partly attributed to strategical voting based on his second-highest score in the previous election as well as opinion polls, but also to his policies' lack of appeal to leftist voters.

Despite the Green gain from the CVP, the FDP and SVP retained their majority of four seats in the executive council.

==== Results by district ====
Vote share of each candidate by district
District	Aeppli SP	Fehr SP	Graf GPS	Gut FDP	Hein. FDP	Holl. CVP	Ingold EVP	Kägi SVP	Stoc. SVP	Scattered
Affoltern	72.4	78.0	72.5	75.1	81.9	67.7	40.7	79.6	83.6	48.5
Andelfingen	59.4	64.6	67.2	73.2	73.9	70.8	47.7	97.7	100.5	45.0
Bülach	62.6	71.4	61.9	78.7	81.8	67.2	38.7	86.3	88.5	62.9
Dielsdorf	60.5	67.8	58.1	78.1	80.4	71.2	34.2	94.7	94.7	60.4
Dietikon	64.7	70.9	56.6	81.2	84.9	71.9	31.1	86.1	89.0	63.7
Hinwil	60.5	70.4	60.5	79.8	81.5	69.9	40.0	89.5	94.1	54.0
Horgen	67.0	79.8	63.4	79.6	84.8	70.7	39.8	73.5	85.6	56.0
Meilen	61.3	69.5	59.5	95.9	95.2	69.0	35.5	82.9	87.5	43.7
Pfäffikon	62.5	71.6	74.7	77.5	79.8	74.6	37.1	82.5	86.5	53.2
Uster	68.7	78.4	68.4	77.7	81.0	69.8	35.6	73.3	77.2	69.9
Winterthur	67.5	79.3	71.7	70.2	72.1	81.9	57.2	66.6	70.0	63.5
Zürich	94.9	104.5	92.9	70.8	74.2	65.5	40.9	52.4	55.3	48.6
Total	72.1	81.5	71.9	77.0	79.8	70.5	41.1	73.3	77.3	55.6

=== Cantonal Council ===
Results of the 2011 Zürich Cantonal Council election
Party	Votes	%	+/–	Seats	+/–
Swiss People's Party	90,035	29.63	−0.82	54	−2
Social Democratic Party	58,687	19.32	−0.15	35	−1
FDP.The Liberals	39,296	12.93	−3.04	23	−6
Green Party	32,111	10.57	+0.13	19	±0
Green Liberal Party	31,191	10.27	+4.51	19	+9
Christian Democratic People's Party	14,774	4.86	−2.38	9	−4
Evangelical People's Party	11,479	3.78	−1.45	7	−3
Conservative Democratic Party	10,529	3.47	New	6	New
Federal Democratic Union	7,815	2.57	−0.24	5	±0
Alternative List	4,945	1.63	+0.36	3	+1
Pirate Party	1,708	0.56	New	0	New
Swiss Democrats	1,231	0.41	−0.92	0	±0
European Reform Party	15	0.00	New	0	New
Total	303,816	100.00	–	180	–
Source: wahlen.zh.ch, electoral protocol

The SVP won a plurality of votes and seats, coming first but losing two seats; no bloc or alliance won an overall majority.

There were few shifts between the three “blocs”, as the left-wing (SP, GP, and AL), centrist (EVP, GLP, FDP, CVP, and now BDP), and right-wing (SVP and EDU) each won a third of the votes and seats; there were larger swings within the centrist bloc as the FDP, CVP, and EVP lost support while the GLP and BDP made gains.

There was also an increased fragmentation of the council as the three largest parties all lost seats. Older parties tended to see their support dwindle or stagnate, while the largest gains went to the newer parties: the GLP nearly doubled their support while the BDP entered with six seats.

==== Results by constituency ====
Number of seats and share of votes for each party by constituency
Constituency	SVP	SP	FDP	GPS	GLP	CVP	EVP	BDP	EDU	AL	Total seats	SVP	SP	FDP	GPS	GLP	CVP	EVP	BDP	EDU	AL	SD
I Zürich City 1 & 2	1	1	1	1	1	0	0	–	0	0	5	18.2	28.6	18.2	14.3	10.9	4.6	1.4	–	0.9	2.3	0.5
II Zürich City 3 & 9	3	3	1	2	1	1	0	0	0	1	12	20.6	29.9	7.8	14.3	10.2	5.1	2.6	1.7	0.7	4.8	1.4
III Zürich City 4 & 5	0	2	0	1	1	0	0	–	0	1	5	10.4	34.4	5.5	18.6	11.3	3.4	1.2	–	0.3	11.8	0.7
IV Zürich City 6 & 10	2	3	1	1	1	0	0	0	0	1	9	16.4	30.2	11.9	15.0	12.0	3.9	2.2	1.6	0.7	4.2	0.6
V Zürich City 7 & 8	1	2	1	1	1	0	0	0	0	0	6	16.7	23.7	19.2	16.2	12.3	4.5	2.0	2.0	0.5	2.4	0.4
VI Zürich City 11 & 12	4	3	1	1	1	1	1	0	0	0	12	26.5	27.0	8.2	11.0	9.3	6.1	3.4	2.2	1.6	2.1	1.4
VII Dietikon	4	2	2	1	1	1	0	0	0	0	11	35.9	17.8	16.6	7.6	5.7	7.8	3.8	2.0	1.1	1.2	0.5
XIII Affoltern	2	1	1	1	1	0	0	0	0	0	6	30.8	15.5	13.1	10.5	11.0	3.2	7.6	4.9	2.7	0.4	0.3
IX Horgen	4	3	2	1	2	1	1	1	0	0	15	29.0	17.5	16.9	8.7	9.5	7.6	4.5	3.6	1.6	0.5	–
X Meilen	4	2	3	1	1	1	0	0	1	0	13	31.4	13.3	22.8	8.0	12.2	4.4	2.4	2.6	2.4	0.4	–
XI Hinwil	4	1	1	1	1	1	1	1	1	0	12	35.8	13.6	9.7	9.0	9.3	5.7	5.5	4.2	6.6	0.6	–
XII Uster	5	2	2	1	2	1	0	2	1	0	16	31.8	17.5	10.8	8.2	13.1	4.3	2.6	6.8	2.5	0.8	1.0
XIII Pfäffikon	2	1	1	1	1	0	1	0	0	0	7	36.0	14.7	10.0	10.8	9.3	3.1	6.3	4.9	4.6	0.4	–
XIV Winterthur City	3	3	1	2	1	1	1	1	0	0	13	21.6	21.7	10.8	14.6	10.2	6.0	5.3	2.6	2.3	2.7	0.7
XV Winterthur Land	2	1	1	1	1	0	1	0	0	0	7	38.8	13.4	10.8	8.1	9.9	3.8	6.4	4.3	3.3	0.3	–
XVI Andelfingen	2	1	1	0	0	0	0	0	0	0	4	40.8	13.8	12.2	10.4	7.2	2.1	2.7	6.9	3.4	0.4	–
XVII Bülach	6	3	2	1	1	1	1	1	1	0	17	36.3	16.7	11.9	7.5	9.2	4.0	4.0	5.0	3.7	0.7	–
XVIII Dielsdorf	5	1	1	1	1	0	0	0	1	0	10	43.4	14.9	9.9	8.0	9.7	4.0	2.2	2.6	4.9	0.4	–
Total	54	35	23	19	19	9	7	6	5	3	180	29.6	19.3	12.9	10.6	10.3	4.9	3.8	3.5	2.6	1.6	0.4
