= 2007 Zürich cantonal elections =

2007 election in Switzerland

← 2003	15 April 2007	2011 →

All 7 seats in the Executive Council of Zürich All 180 seats in the Cantonal Council of Zürich (91 seats needed for a majority)
- Executive Council
	First party	Second party
Party	Free Democrats	Social Democrats
Elected	Ursula Gut; 151,730, 86.29%	Markus Notter; 128,384, 73.01%
	Thomas Heiniger; 133,768, 76.07%	Regine Aeppli; 121,671, 69.19%
	Third party	Fourth party
Party	Swiss People's	Christian Democrats
Elected	Markus Kägi; 112,995, 64.26%	Hans Hollenstein; 136,977, 77.90%
	Rita Fuhrer; 112,607, 64.04%
- Cantonal Council
Party	Vote %	Seats	+/–
Swiss People's	30.46%	56	−5
Social Democrats	19.47%	36	−17
Free Democrats	15.98%	29	0
Greens	10.44%	19	+5
Christian Democrats	7.25%	13	+1
Green Liberals	5.75%	10	New
Evangelical People's	5.23%	10	+1
Federal Democrats	2.82%	5	+4
Alternative List	1.26%	2	New
This lists parties that won seats. See the complete results below.

The 2007 Zürich cantonal elections were held on 15 April 2007, to elect the seven members of the cantonal Executive Council and the 180 members of the Cantonal Council.

The FDP-SVP alliance gained a majority in the Executive Council by winning four seats. In the Cantonal Council, the SVP retained a plurality but the SVP-FDP alliance lost their overall majority, resulting in a more fragmented council.

== Electoral system ==
=== Executive Council ===
The Executive Council contains 7 members elected using a two-round majoritarian system. In the first round, electors have up to seven votes and the 7 most-voted candidates reaching an overall majority (>50%) are elected. If seats remain to be filled, a runoff is held where electors have as many votes as seats remaining, and the candidates with the most votes (simple plurality) are elected.

=== Cantonal Council ===
The Cantonal Council is elected using open-list proportional representation, with canton-wide apportionment of seats and allocation into 18 constituencies (biproportional apportionment). In each constituency, voters have as many votes as there are seats to fill (panachage is permitted); these votes each count both for the candidate and for the list they stand in. These votes counts are divided by the seats count to give fictional electors counts which can be summed up fairly throughout the canton.

Using the fictional electors counts, each party above the threshold (reaching 5% in at least one constituency) is apportioned seats canton-wide, which are then shared among their constituency lists. In each constituency list, the seats are attributed to the candidates reaching the most votes.

This method was new compared to the simple allocation per constituency used in the last election; it was expected to help the smaller parties.

== Candidates ==
=== Executive Council ===
The FDP and SVP ran together as the "4 wins" ticket, hoping to regain a majority on the Executive Council after having lost it to Hans Hollenstein in 2005. The FDP fielded incumbent councillor Ursula Gut (elected in a by-election the year before to replace retiring councillor Dorothé Fierz) as well as Thomas Heiniger (as a replacement for Rüdi Jecker who stood down) while the SVP ran incumbent councillors Markus Kägi and Rita Fuhrer.

The CVP ran without a formal alliance with the FDP and SVP but benefited from informal support. Incumbent christian-democratic councillor Hans Hollenstein ran for re-election as the party's sole candidate.

Both social-democratic incumbent councillors, Markus Notter and Regine Aeppli, ran for re-election.

Incumbent councillor Verena Diener had been elected in 2003 as a Green and had switched the next year to the Green Liberal Party; she did not run for re-election, opting to join federal politics by contesting the election to the Council of States. The Green-Liberals ran party leader and national councillor Martin Bäumle while the Greens fielded Illnau-Effretikon mayor Martin Graf.

=== Cantonal Council ===
The table below lists contesting parties represented in the Cantonal Council before the election.

Name		Ideology	2003 result	
Name		Ideology	Votes (%)	Seats
SVP	Swiss People's Party; Schweizerische Volkspartei	National conservatism Right-wing populism	30.2%	61 / 180
SP	Social Democratic Party; Sozialdemokratische Partei	Social democracy Democratic socialism	26.2%	53 / 180
FDP	Free Democratic Party; Freisinnig-Demokratische Partei	Liberalism; Conservative liberalism	15.9%	28 / 180
GPS	Green Party; Grüne Partei	Green politics Progressivism	7.9%	14 / 180
CVP	Christian Democratic People's Party; Christlichdemokratische Volkspartei	Christian democracy Social conservatism	6.4%	13 / 180
EVP	Evangelical People's Party; Evangelische Volkspartei	Christian democracy Social conservatism	5.1%	9 / 180
EDU	Federal Democratic Union; Eidgenössisch-Demokratische Union	National conservatism	2.1%	1 / 180
SD	Swiss Democrats; Schweizer Demokraten	Nationalism	1.4%	1 / 180
AL	Alternative List; Alternative Liste	Socialism	0.9%	1 / 180
GLP	Green Liberal Party; Grünliberale Partei	Green liberalism Social liberalism	Did not exist	

== Results ==
=== Executive Council ===
Note: percentages here are calculated based on the number of valid votes (excluding blank and invalid votes) so that the absolute majority is at exactly 50%, but may result in candidates reaching over 100% of the valid votes.

Results of the 2007 Zürich Executive Council election
Candidate	Party	Votes	%
Ursula Gut (Inc.)	FDP	151,730	86.29
Hans Hollenstein (Inc.)	CVP	136,977	77.90
Thomas Heiniger	FDP	133,768	76.07
Markus Notter (Inc.)	SP	128,384	73.01
Regine Aeppli (Inc.)	SP	121,671	69.19
Markus Kägi	SVP	112,995	64.26
Rita Fuhrer (Inc.)	SVP	112,607	64.04
Martin Graf	Grüne	97,542	55.47
Martin Bäumle	glp	90,851	51.67
Johannes Zollinger	EVP	46,686	26.55
Markus Alder	SD	8,535	4.85
Scattered votes		89,156	50.70
Total		1,230,902	67.87
Blank votes		571,362	31.51
Invalid votes		11,275	0.62
Total votes		1,813,539	7×
Total ballots		268,742	–
Registered voters/Turnout		820,414	32.76
Source: Official Journal

The SVP and FDP's "4 wins" ticket succeeded with all four candidates elected and re-gained their seat lost two years earlier; both the FDP candidates polled significantly higher than the SVP ones. CVP candidate Hans Hollenstein also retained his seat in second place, along with both SP councillors. Green candidate Martin Graf and Green-Liberal candidate Martin Bäumle both failed despite reaching overall majorities.

==== Results by district ====
Vote share of each candidate by district
District	Aeppli SP	Alder SD	Bäumle GLP	Fuhrer SVP	Graf GPS	Gut FDP	Hein. FDP	Holl. CVP	Kägi SVP	Notter SP	Zoll. EVP	Scattered
Affoltern	67.0	2.7	51.1	72.6	51.2	95.3	84.7	68.8	69.8	71.0	20.4	45.4
Andelfingen	53.4	2.5	34.7	90.7	48.9	103.2	90.7	64.5	84.3	59.5	20.3	47.2
Bülach	62.1	4.2	53.0	66.9	49.6	85.9	78.0	77.3	71.3	65.8	28.5	57.3
Dielsdorf	61.8	4.4	49.9	69.6	46.9	89.3	80.9	75.0	75.1	63.9	26.3	57.0
Dietikon	64.7	4.5	36.7	76.6	41.3	93.7	83.6	77.3	75.7	72.3	20.7	53.0
Hinwil	58.2	3.7	49.4	76.2	48.2	92.4	82.8	73.8	73.2	62.4	32.7	46.8
Horgen	63.8	2.1	47.6	67.2	47.3	85.8	79.7	78.5	65.6	67.0	37.9	57.7
Meilen	58.3	3.3	46.0	76.0	40.0	105.1	92.7	71.1	77.6	60.5	22.5	46.9
Pfäffikon	61.7	8.5	49.6	67.4	62.1	87.9	75.0	79.8	67.0	66.6	34.6	39.7
Uster	66.0	2.8	68.6	61.4	48.8	88.3	77.1	73.8	62.8	68.1	26.7	55.7
Winterthur	68.1	2.1	44.2	61.5	64.2	79.2	68.5	92.8	60.7	75.0	27.1	56.5
Zürich	88.3	9.1	58.6	47.9	70.8	75.2	64.3	78.7	48.3	91.1	22.3	45.3
Total	69.2	4.9	51.7	64.0	55.5	86.3	76.1	77.9	64.3	73.0	26.5	50.7

=== Cantonal Council ===
Results of the 2007 Zürich Cantonal Council election
Party	Votes	%	+/–	Seats	+/–
Swiss People's Party	85,056	30.46	+0.26	56	−5
Social Democratic Party	54,363	19.47	−6.68	36	−17
Free Democratic Party	44,622	15.98	+0.09	29	±0
Green Party	29,155	10.44	+2.60	19	+5
Christian Democratic People's Party	20,235	7.25	+0.89	13	+1
Green Liberal Party	16,071	5.75	New	10	New
Evangelical People's Party	14,608	5.23	+0.12	10	+1
Federal Democratic Union	7,865	2.82	+0.71	5	+4
Swiss Democrats	3,702	1.33	−0.02	0	−1
Alternative List/PdA	3,532	1.26	+0.05	2	+2
Ueli Hanf list	54	0.02	New	0	New
Total	279,263	100.00	–	180	–
Source: Official Journal

The Swiss People's Party won a plurality but lost five seats, resulting in the SVP-FDP alliance losing their narrow majority in the Council. The social democrats suffered a loss of 17 seats, their losses were mainly attributed to voters switching to the greens (who gained five seats) and green-liberals (who entered the Council with ten seats). The CVP and EVP saw similar results to four years earlier, while the EDU gained four seats from the new apportionment rule. The Alternative List regained representation while the Swiss Democrats failed to clear the threshold of 5% in any of the constituencies. The resulting Council was seen as more unpredictable since it did not have any expected coalition anymore.

The SP's large losses were seen as the main change in this elections, though their outgoing 53 seats had been their highest seat count since 1955, meaning this election was only their worst result since 1987. The Greens and Green-liberals were seen as the main gains of this election, together now representing a sixth of the Council.

==== Results by constituency ====
Number of seats and share of votes for each party by constituency
Constituency	SVP	SP	FDP	GPS	CVP	GLP	EVP	EDU	AL	Total seats	SVP	SP	FDP	GPS	CVP	GLP	EVP	EDU	SD	AL	UH
I Zürich City 1 & 2	1	2	1	1	0	0	0	0	0	5	19.9	27.1	21.3	13.2	6.7	5.6	1.7	1.0	1.4	2.1	–
II Zürich City 3 & 9	3	3	1	2	1	1	0	0	1	12	24.8	28.6	8.1	12.9	8.5	5.4	4.2	1.0	3.0	3.3	0.3
III Zürich City 4 & 5	1	2	0	1	0	0	0	0	1	5	14.9	32.9	6.7	20.8	4.4	7.6	1.1	0.4	1.8	9.3	–
IV Zürich City 6 & 10	2	3	1	1	1	1	0	0	0	9	19.5	29.2	14.5	15.4	6.4	6.5	3.6	0.8	1.3	2.8	–
V Zürich City 7 & 8	1	2	2	1	1	0	0	0	0	7	15.7	22.3	24.0	17.3	6.5	7.3	3.4	0.6	0.9	2.0	–
VI Zürich City 11 & 12	4	3	1	1	1	1	1	0	0	12	29.7	26.6	10.0	10.1	8.3	4.5	4.1	1.6	3.8	1.3	–
VII Dietikon	4	2	2	1	1	0	1	0	0	11	38.0	17.7	16.7	6.7	11.0	2.9	4.2	1.3	1.0	0.7	–
XIII Affoltern	2	1	1	1	0	0	1	0	0	6	31.2	18.5	19.4	7.3	5.5	6.1	7.7	3.4	0.4	0.5	–
IX Horgen	4	2	4	1	2	1	1	0	0	15	29.0	17.1	21.3	10.1	8.9	4.9	5.5	1.9	0.6	0.6	–
X Meilen	4	2	3	1	1	1	0	1	0	13	31.4	15.8	26.6	6.3	6.7	6.2	3.6	2.8	0.5	0.3	–
XI Hinwil	4	1	1	1	1	1	1	1	0	11	33.4	13.6	12.2	10.2	8.6	5.0	7.1	7.5	1.8	0.6	–
XII Uster	5	2	3	1	1	2	1	1	0	16	32.5	17.3	14.8	6.7	6.7	12.1	4.3	3.2	1.7	0.6	–
XIII Pfäffikon	3	1	1	1	0	0	1	0	0	7	35.5	14.1	12.5	13.2	5.4	3.8	9.3	4.5	1.3	0.3	–
XIV Winterthur City	3	3	2	2	1	1	1	0	0	13	24.1	22.1	13.6	13.0	8.9	5.0	6.9	2.7	1.3	2.3	–
XV Winterthur Land	3	1	1	1	0	0	1	0	0	7	38.9	14.0	13.7	8.8	6.1	3.7	9.9	3.8	0.7	0.4	–
XVI Andelfingen	2	1	1	0	0	0	0	0	0	4	42.3	13.2	16.9	10.3	3.0	3.1	5.0	4.3	0.4	1.5	–
XVII Bülach	6	3	3	1	1	1	1	1	0	17	36.4	17.6	14.3	8.7	6.5	5.3	6.1	3.5	1.1	0.4	–
XVIII Dielsdorf	4	2	1	1	1	0	0	1	0	10	43.0	16.1	11.8	9.2	6.3	5.1	3.5	3.7	1.0	0.3	–
Total	56	36	29	19	1	103	10	5	2	180	30.5	19.5	16.0	10.4	7.3	5.8	5.2	2.8	1.3	1.3	0.0
