= 2015 Zürich cantonal elections =

| ← 2011 | 18 April 2015 | 2019 → |

All 7 seats in the Executive Council of Zürich All 180 seats in the Cantonal Council of Zürich (91 seats needed for a majority)
- Executive Council
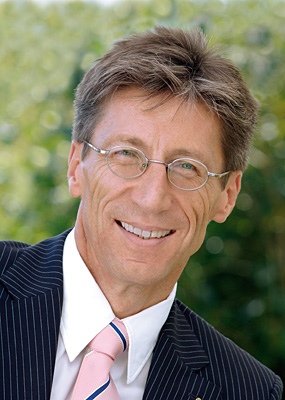

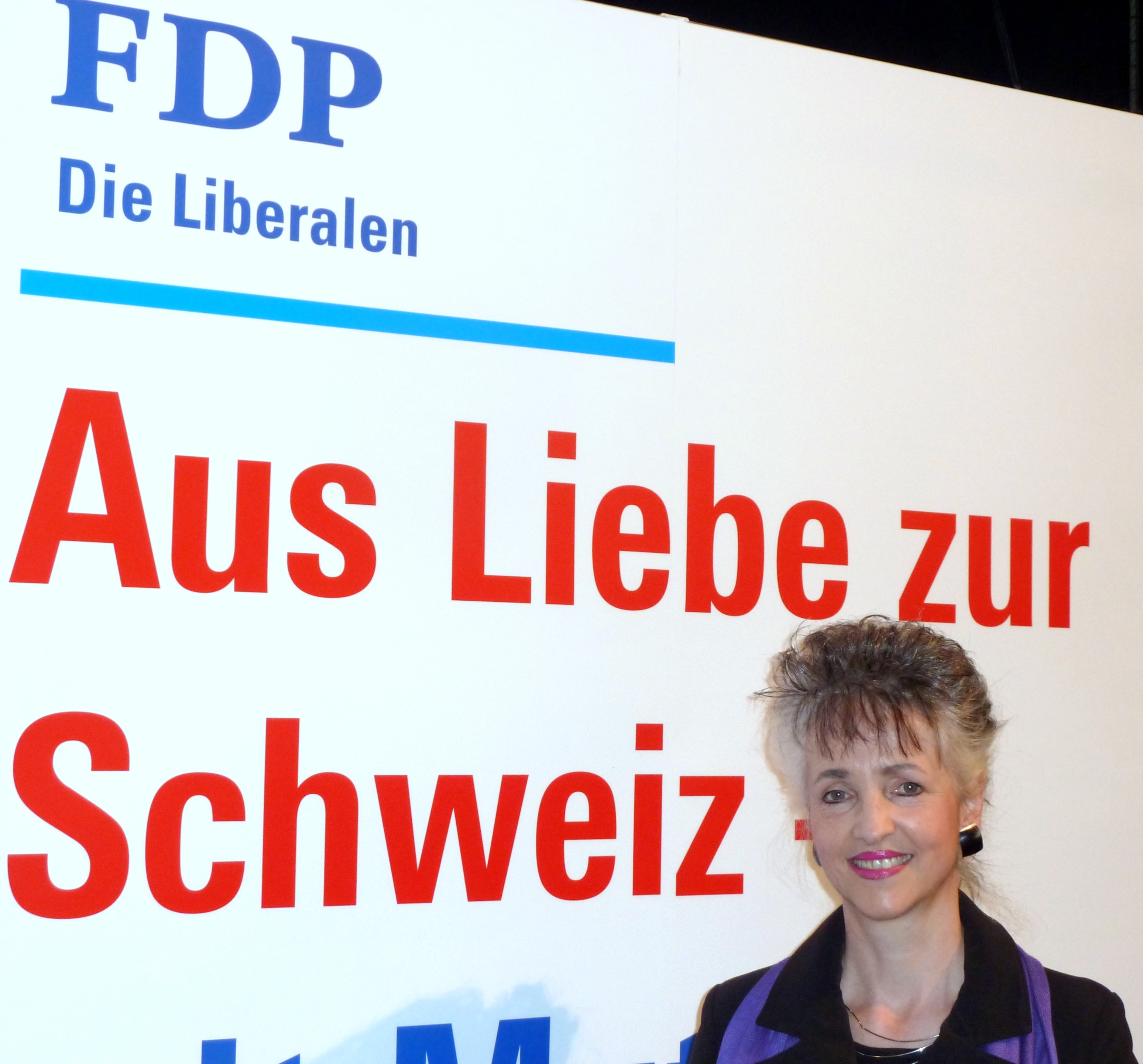

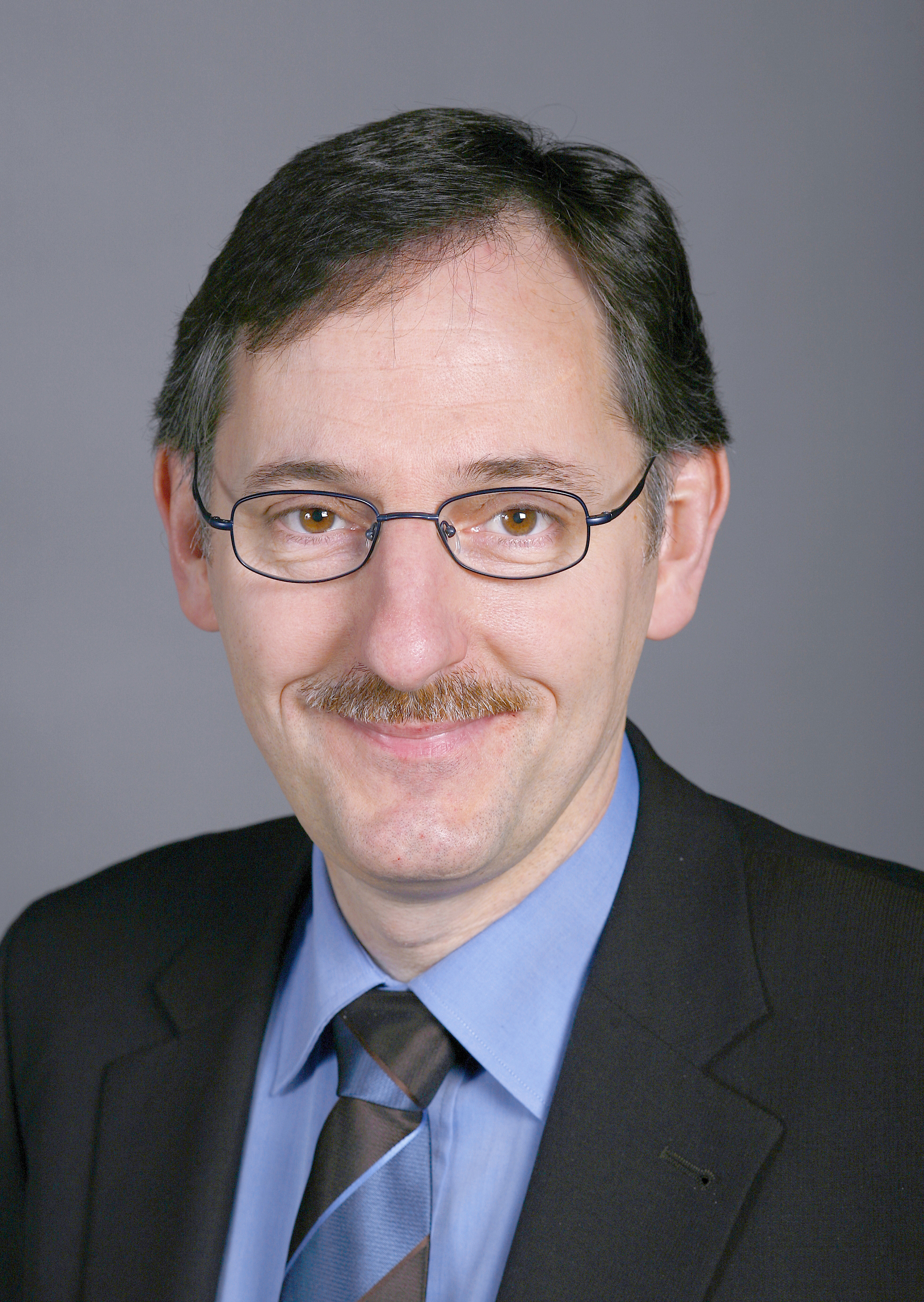

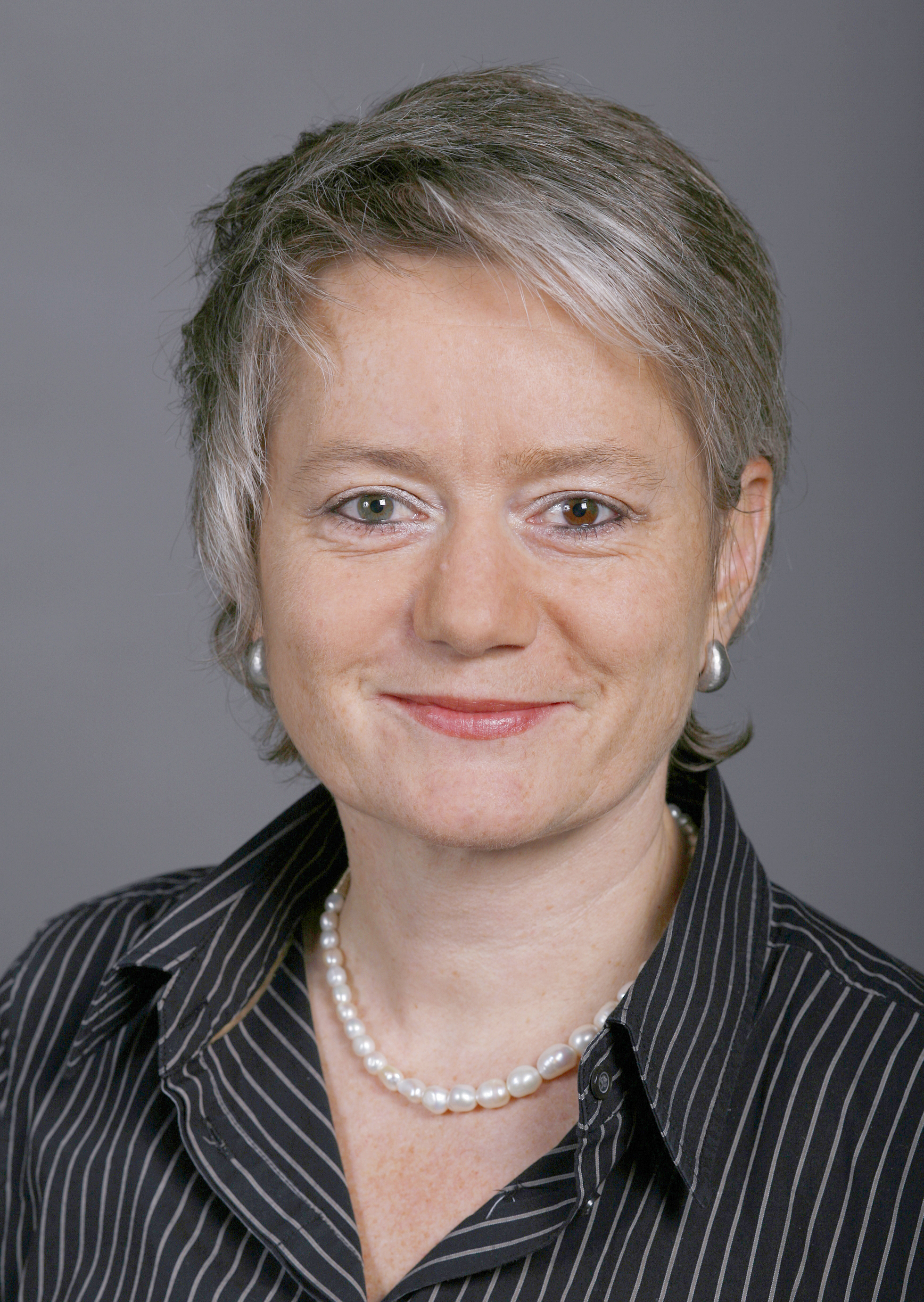

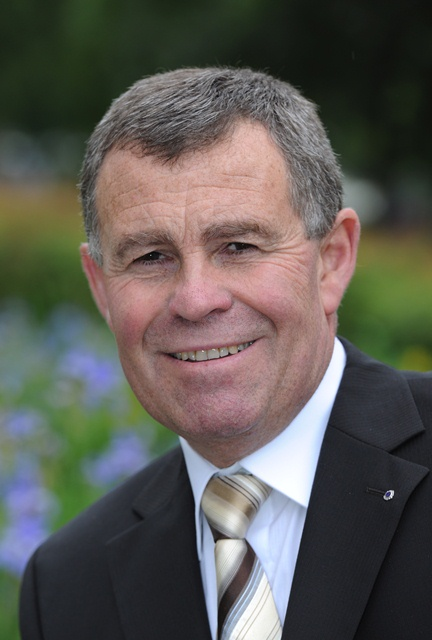
| | First party | Second party |
|---|---|---|
| Party | FDP.The Liberals | Social Democrats |
| Elected | Thomas Heiniger; 150,557, 82.83% | Mario Fehr; 146,307, 80.49% |
| | Carmen W. Späh; 116,058, 63.85% | Jacqueline Fehr; 115,618, 63.61% |
| | Third party | Fourth party |
| Party | Swiss People's | Christian Democrats |
| Elected | Ernst Stocker; 145,205, 79.88% | Sylvia Steiner; 118,477, 65.18% |
| | Markus Kägi; 136,563, 75.13% |
- Cantonal Council
| Party | Vote % | Seats | +/– |
|---|---|---|---|
| Swiss People's | 30.02% | 54 | 0 |
| Social Democrats | 19.67% | 36 | +1 |
| FDP.The Liberals | 17.33% | 31 | +8 |
| Green Liberals | 7.64% | 14 | −5 |
| Greens | 7.22% | 13 | −6 |
| Christian Democrats | 4.88% | 9 | 0 |
| Evangelical People's | 4.27% | 8 | +1 |
| BDP | 2.62% | 5 | −1 |
| Federal Democrats | 2.66% | 5 | 0 |
| Alternative List | 2.98% | 5 | +2 |
This lists parties that won seats. See the complete results below.

The 2015 Zürich cantonal elections were held on 12 April 2015, to elect the seven members of the cantonal Executive Council and the 180 members of the Cantonal Council.

This election resulted in a large gain for the bourgeois parties (SVP, FDP, CVP), as the FDP gained eight seats in the Cantonal Council and the CVP gained one executive councilor, resulting in the alliance holding an overall majority in the national council and five of the seven executive councilors.

== Electoral system ==
=== Executive Council ===
The Executive Council contains seven members elected using a two-round majoritarian system. In the first round, electors have up to seven votes and the seven most-voted candidates reaching an overall majority (>50%) are elected. If seats remain to be filled, a runoff is held where electors have as many votes as seats remaining, and the candidates with the most votes (simple plurality) are elected.

=== Cantonal Council ===
The Cantonal Council is elected using open-list proportional representation, with canton-wide apportionment of seats and allocation into 18 constituencies (biproportional apportionment). In each constituency, voters have as many votes as there are seats to fill (panachage is permitted); these votes each count both for the candidate and for the list they stand in. These votes counts are divided by the seats count to give fictional electors counts which can be summed up fairly throughout the canton.

Using the fictional electors counts, each party above the threshold (reaching 5% in at least one constituency) is apportioned seats canton-wide, which are then shared among their constituency lists. In each constituency list, the seats are attributed to the candidates reaching the most votes.

Number of seats by constituency
| Constituency | | Seats | Change |
|---|---|---|---|
| I | Zürich city districts 1 & 2 | 4 | −1 |
| II | Zürich city districts 3 & 9 | 12 | = |
| III | Zürich city districts 4 & 5 | 5 | = |
| IV | Zürich city districts 6 & 10 | 9 | = |
| V | Zürich city districts 7 & 8 | 6 | = |
| VI | Zürich city districts 11 & 12 | 12 | = |
| VII | Dietikon | 11 | = |
| VIII | Affoltern | 6 | = |
| IX | Horgen | 15 | = |
| X | Meilen | 13 | = |
| XI | Hinwil | 12 | = |
| XII | Uster | 16 | = |
| XIII | Pfäffikon | 7 | = |
| XIV | Winterthur city | 13 | = |
| XV | Winterthur land | 7 | = |
| XVI | Andelfingen | 4 | = |
| XVII | Bülach | 17 | = |
| XVIII | Dielsdorf | 11 | +1 |

== Candidates ==
=== Executive Council ===
Five of the seven incumbents councilors ran for re-election: Mario Fehr (SP), Thomas Heiniger (FDP), Ernst Stocker (SVP), Markus Kägi (SVP), and Martin Graf (Grüne). The first four were seen as safe seats.

Incumbent councilors Ursula Gut (FDP) and Regine Aeppli (SP) stood down, with cantonal councilor Carmen Walker Späh (FDP) and national councilor Jacqueline Fehr (SP) running to replace them. Former councilor Hans Hollenstein (CVP) defeated narrowly in 2011 did not run, with the CVP running cantonal councilor Sylvia Steiner in his place.

The bourgeois parties (SVP, FDP, and CVP) ran as the "top-5" ticket, with the goals of unseating Martin Graf and gaining a fifth councilor for the alliance. The pre-election polls showed a tight race between Steiner and Graf for the last seat.

Three candidates from minor parties ran: Markus Bischoff for the Alternative List, Nik Gugger for the EVP, and Marcel Lenggenhager for the BDP.

=== Cantonal Council ===
The table below lists contesting parties represented in the Cantonal Council before the election.

| Name | | Ideology | 2011 result | |
| Name | | Ideology | Votes (%) | Seats |
|---|---|---|---|---|
| SVP | Swiss People's Party; Schweizerische Volkspartei | National conservatism Right-wing populism | 29.6% | 54 / 180 |
| SP | Social Democratic Party; Sozialdemokratische Partei | Social democracy Democratic socialism | 19.3% | 35 / 180 |
| FDP | FDP.The Liberals; FDP.Die Liberalen | Classical liberalism Conservative liberalism | 12.9% | 23 / 180 |
| GPS | Green Party; Grüne Partei | Green politics Progressivism | 10.6% | 19 / 180 |
| GLP | Green Liberal Party; Grünliberale Partei | Green liberalism Social liberalism | 10.3% | 19 / 180 |
| CVP | Christian Democratic People's Party; Christlichdemokratische Volkspartei | Christian democracy Social conservatism | 4.9% | 9 / 180 |
| EVP | Evangelical People's Party; Evangelische Volkspartei | Christian democracy Social conservatism | 3.8% | 7 / 180 |
| BDP | Conservative Democratic Party; Bürgerlich-Demokratische Partei | Christian democracy Social conservatism | 3.5% | 6 / 180 |
| EDU | Federal Democratic Union; Eidgenössisch-Demokratische Union | National conservatism | 2.6% | 5 / 180 |
| AL | Alternative List; Alternative Liste | Socialism | 1.6% | 3 / 180 |

The Pirate Party ran again, along with Integrale Politik ZH and the Young Socialists, while the Swiss Democrats did not run, meaning a total of 13 parties contested this election, as many as in 2011.

== Results ==
=== Executive Council ===
Note: percentages here are calculated based on the number of valid votes (excluding blank and invalid votes) so that the absolute majority is at exactly 50%, but may result in candidates reaching over 100% of the valid votes.

Results of the 2015 Zürich Executive Council election
| Candidate | Party | Votes | % |
|---|---|---|---|
| Thomas Heiniger | FDP | 150,557 | 82.83 |
| Mario Fehr | SP | 146,307 | 80.49 |
| Ernst Stocker | SVP | 145,205 | 79.88 |
| Markus Kägi | SVP | 136,563 | 75.13 |
| Sylvia Steiner | CVP | 118,477 | 65.18 |
| Carmen Walker Späh | FDP | 116,058 | 63.85 |
| Jacqueline Fehr | SP | 115,618 | 63.61 |
| Martin Graf | Grüne | 109,625 | 60.31 |
| Markus Bischoff | AL | 67,103 | 36.92 |
| Nik Gugger | EVP | 42,623 | 23.45 |
| Marcel Lenggenhager | BDP | 42,443 | 23.35 |
| Dani Schafroth | Ind. | 9,625 | 5.30 |
| Scattered votes | | 72,224 | 39.73 |
| Total | | 1,272,428 | 66.52 |
| Blank and invalid votes | | 736,318 | 39.50 |
| Total votes | | 1,864,016 | 7× |
| Valid ballots | | 266,288 | 96.79 |
| Invalid ballots | | 8,829 | 3.21 |
| Total ballots | | 275,117 | – |
| Registered voters/Turnout | | 879,262 | 31.29 |

This election was an upset in the opposite direction than 2011. CVP candidate Sylvia Steiner regained the CVP's seat while overtaking both Carmen Walker Späh and Jacqueline Fehr, who were expected to perform better. Green candidate Martin Graf lost his seat by a margin of six thousand votes behind Jacqueline Fehr.

Thomas Heiniger topped the polls with over 82%, overtaking Mario Fehr for first place. The four regular incumbents (Heiniger, M. Fehr, Stocker, and Kägi) were re-elected comfortably while the race was closer between the other candidates. Both SVP candidates saw their vote share slightly increase.

The "top-5" ticket of bourgeois parties won in an upset, with five of the top six candidates, and flipping a fifth seat in the council.

=== Results by district ===
Vote share of each candidate by district
| District | Bisc. AL | J. Fehr SP | M. Fehr SP | Graf GPS | Gugg. EVP | Hein. FDP | Kägi SVP | Leng. BDP | Schaf. Ind. | Stei. CVP | Stoc. SVP | Späh FDP | Scattered |
|---|---|---|---|---|---|---|---|---|---|---|---|---|---|
| Affoltern | 30.4 | 61.1 | 77.7 | 59.8 | 21.0 | 85.1 | 81.0 | 20.1 | 5.6 | 68.4 | 85.0 | 67.1 | 37.8 |
| Andelfingen | 22.4 | 53.5 | 68.6 | 54.4 | 28.3 | 83.8 | 94.2 | 25.8 | 4.9 | 64.0 | 97.9 | 62.4 | 39.6 |
| Bülach | 25.0 | 54.1 | 73.6 | 51.2 | 26.1 | 85.2 | 85.1 | 26.0 | 5.0 | 67.4 | 89.4 | 65.7 | 46.3 |
| Dielsdorf | 21.2 | 50.7 | 69.0 | 48.7 | 22.0 | 88.2 | 96.3 | 19.9 | 3.9 | 70.4 | 97.6 | 67.5 | 44.6 |
| Dietikon | 24.8 | 53.2 | 71.9 | 46.3 | 16.5 | 90.1 | 88.2 | 20.8 | 4.0 | 74.2 | 91.3 | 71.7 | 46.9 |
| Hinwil | 28.0 | 51.0 | 67.9 | 50.6 | 27.2 | 85.8 | 85.9 | 25.7 | 4.4 | 70.1 | 91.7 | 66.3 | 45.5 |
| Horgen | 26.5 | 55.3 | 78.8 | 51.5 | 21.1 | 91.8 | 80.9 | 22.2 | 3.8 | 71.9 | 93.5 | 68.8 | 34.0 |
| Meilen | 25.5 | 48.8 | 70.4 | 48.5 | 19.1 | 96.8 | 85.0 | 23.3 | 4.4 | 73.3 | 90.2 | 78.0 | 36.8 |
| Pfäffikon | 23.6 | 56.2 | 73.0 | 62.9 | 28.8 | 84.7 | 82.5 | 24.1 | 3.2 | 68.4 | 86.1 | 64.5 | 42.0 |
| Uster | 31.5 | 58.4 | 77.7 | 54.6 | 20.4 | 83.8 | 76.1 | 29.8 | 3.6 | 66.2 | 81.1 | 63.5 | 53.4 |
| Winterthur | 37.9 | 71.6 | 82.8 | 64.4 | 37.2 | 72.9 | 69.7 | 26.2 | 4.6 | 58.2 | 74.2 | 54.4 | 45.7 |
| Zürich | 62.3 | 83.0 | 96.9 | 77.9 | 18.4 | 74.8 | 55.2 | 19.9 | 8.3 | 57.6 | 58.4 | 58.3 | 29.2 |
| Total | 36.9 | 63.6 | 80.5 | 60.3 | 23.4 | 82.8 | 75.1 | 23.3 | 5.3 | 65.2 | 79.9 | 63.8 | 39.7 |

=== Cantonal Council ===
Results of the 2015 Zürich Cantonal Council election
| Party | Votes | % | +/– | Seats | +/– |
|---|---|---|---|---|---|
| Swiss People's Party | 86,036 | 30.02 | +0.39 | 54 | ±0 |
| Social Democratic Party | 56,375 | 19.67 | +0.35 | 36 | +1 |
| FDP.The Liberals | 49,655 | 17.33 | +4.40 | 31 | +8 |
| Green Liberal Party | 21,887 | 7.64 | −2.63 | 14 | −5 |
| Green Party | 20,687 | 7.22 | −3.35 | 13 | −6 |
| Christian Democratic People's Party | 13,981 | 4.88 | +0.02 | 9 | ±0 |
| Evangelical People's Party | 12,242 | 4.27 | +0.49 | 8 | +1 |
| Alternative List | 8,533 | 2.98 | +1.35 | 5 | +2 |
| Federal Democratic Union | 7,629 | 2.66 | +0.29 | 5 | ±0 |
| Conservative Democratic Party | 7,497 | 2.62 | −0.85 | 5 | −1 |
| Pirate Party | 1,860 | 0.65 | +0.09 | 0 | – |
| Young Socialists Switzerland | 126 | 0.04 | New | 0 | New |
| Integrale Politik | 60 | 0.02 | New | 0 | New |
| Total | 286,568 | 100.00 | – | 180 | – |
Source: wahlen.zh.ch

The SVP retained its plurality of votes and seats in the council, and the social democrats maintained second place by gaining one seat. The liberals made the largest gains by far, gaining eight seats, in what the Tages-Anzeiger described as a "triumphant comeback" after "decades of decline". Both ecologist parties lost over a quarter of their seats, while the Alternative List gained two seats. The Liberals' gains allowed the "top-5" alliance of bourgeois parties (SVP, FDP, and CVP) to re-gain a majority, while giving them a larger influence within the alliance.

=== Results by constituency ===
Number of seats for each party by constituency
| Constituency | SVP | SP | FDP | GLP | GPS | CVP | EVP | AL | EDU | BDP | Total seats | SVP | SP | FDP | GLP | GPS | CVP | EVP | AL | EDU | BDP | PP |
| I Zürich City 1 & 2 | 1 | 1 | 1 | 0 | 1 | 0 | 0 | 0 | 0 | – | 4 | 17.6 | 26.6 | 22.3 | 8.7 | 11.9 | 4.7 | 1.7 | 5.6 | 0.8 | – | – |
| II Zürich City 3 & 9 | 2 | 4 | 2 | 1 | 1 | 1 | 0 | 1 | 0 | 0 | 12 | 20.4 | 29.8 | 12.2 | 7.6 | 10.6 | 5.2 | 2.7 | 8.4 | 0.6 | 0.9 | 1.5 |
| III Zürich City 4 & 5 | 0 | 2 | 0 | 1 | 1 | 0 | 0 | 1 | 0 | 0 | 5 | 9.3 | 31.3 | 9.2 | 9.9 | 15.4 | 2.2 | 1.0 | 17.8 | 0.6 | 0.8 | 2.7 |
| IV Zürich City 6 & 10 | 2 | 3 | 1 | 1 | 1 | 0 | 0 | 1 | 0 | 0 | 9 | 16.7 | 30.0 | 16.2 | 8.8 | 10.4 | 3.9 | 2.2 | 9.1 | 0.6 | 1.3 | 0.9 |
| V Zürich City 7 & 8 | 1 | 2 | 2 | 0 | 1 | 0 | 0 | 0 | 0 | 0 | 6 | 16.3 | 24.6 | 27.3 | 8.3 | 10.7 | 4.6 | 2.3 | 4.8 | 0.4 | 0.8 | – |
| VI Zürich City 11 & 12 | 3 | 3 | 2 | 1 | 1 | 1 | 0 | 1 | 0 | 0 | 12 | 26.4 | 27.2 | 11.6 | 7.6 | 8.1 | 6.5 | 3.6 | 4.3 | 1.5 | 2.1 | 1.2 |
| VII Dietikon | 4 | 2 | 3 | 1 | 0 | 1 | 0 | 0 | 0 | 0 | 11 | 36.3 | 17.5 | 20.0 | 5.6 | 3.7 | 8.3 | 3.8 | 1.3 | 1.1 | 1.6 | 0.7 |
| XIII Affoltern | 2 | 1 | 1 | 1 | 0 | 0 | 1 | 0 | 0 | – | 6 | 32.3 | 18.1 | 18.1 | 8.2 | 7.0 | 3.8 | 8.7 | 1.0 | 2.2 | – | – |
| IX Horgen | 4 | 3 | 3 | 1 | 1 | 1 | 1 | 0 | 0 | 1 | 15 | 29.5 | 16.9 | 21.7 | 7.5 | 5.9 | 8.2 | 4.2 | 1.3 | 1.5 | 2.9 | 0.4 |
| X Meilen | 4 | 2 | 4 | 1 | 1 | 1 | 0 | 0 | 0 | 0 | 13 | 31.2 | 14.7 | 28.8 | 7.7 | 5.0 | 4.5 | 2.2 | 1.1 | 2.8 | 2.0 | – |
| XI Hinwil | 4 | 1 | 1 | 1 | 1 | 1 | 1 | 0 | 1 | 1 | 12 | 36.1 | 13.3 | 14.2 | 6.9 | 6.4 | 5.6 | 5.9 | 1.3 | 6.7 | 3.6 | – |
| XII Uster | 5 | 3 | 2 | 1 | 1 | 1 | 1 | 0 | 1 | 1 | 16 | 33.5 | 17.7 | 15.7 | 9.1 | 5.6 | 4.7 | 3.1 | 1.2 | 2.6 | 5.7 | 0.6 |
| XIII Pfäffikon | 3 | 1 | 1 | 0 | 0 | 0 | 1 | 0 | 1 | 0 | 7 | 36.2 | 16.2 | 14.6 | 7.1 | 5.9 | 2.9 | 8.3 | 0.8 | 4.6 | 3.0 | 0.4 |
| XIV Winterthur City | 3 | 3 | 1 | 1 | 1 | 1 | 1 | 1 | 0 | 1 | 13 | 21.9 | 24.2 | 12.6 | 8.3 | 9.2 | 5.4 | 7.6 | 3.8 | 2.3 | 2.8 | 1.7 |
| XV Winterthur Land | 3 | 1 | 1 | 1 | 0 | 0 | 1 | 0 | 0 | 0 | 7 | 40.1 | 12.8 | 14.0 | 8.7 | 5.1 | 3.1 | 6.9 | 0.8 | 3.1 | 4.5 | 0.8 |
| XVI Andelfingen | 2 | 1 | 1 | 0 | 0 | 0 | 0 | 0 | 0 | 0 | 4 | 39.3 | 14.5 | 17.1 | 5.2 | 8.8 | 1.8 | 3.0 | 0.9 | 3.6 | 5.8 | – |
| XVII Bülach | 6 | 2 | 3 | 1 | 1 | 1 | 1 | 0 | 1 | 1 | 17 | 37.5 | 16.8 | 16.6 | 6.3 | 5.0 | 4.0 | 4.6 | 0.9 | 4.2 | 3.5 | 0.5 |
| XVIII Dielsdorf | 5 | 1 | 2 | 1 | 1 | 0 | 0 | 0 | 1 | 0 | 11 | 45.0 | 14.4 | 13.7 | 6.5 | 5.6 | 3.4 | 2.6 | 0.5 | 5.9 | 1.7 | 0.8 |
| Total | 54 | 36 | 31 | 14 | 13 | 9 | 8 | 5 | 5 | 5 | 180 | 30.0 | 19.7 | 17.3 | 7.6 | 7.2 | 4.9 | 4.3 | 3.0 | 2.7 | 2.6 | 0.7 |
