= 2003 Zürich cantonal elections =

2003 Zürich cantonal election
← 1999	6 April 2003	2007 →
- All 180 seats in the Cantonal Council of Zürich (91 seats needed for a majority)
Party	Vote %	Seats	+/–
Swiss People's	30.24%	61	+1
Social Democrats	26.17%	53	+10
Free Democrats	15.91%	29	−6
Greens	7.86%	14	+3
Christian Democrats	6.37%	12	−1
Evangelical People's	5.12%	9	0
Federal Democrats	2.11%	1	0
Swiss Democrats	1.35%	1	−1
This lists parties that won seats. See the complete results below.

The 2003 Zürich cantonal elections were held on 6 April 2003, to elect the seven members of the cantonal Executive Council) and the 180 members of the Cantonal Council.

== Background ==
In 1999, the bourgeois parties alliance of FDP, CVP, and SVP won five of the seven executive councillors, with the left parties (SP and Greens) won the remaining two. In this election, the SP hoped to gain a second seat; the SVP, bolstered by their national momentum, left the alliance with the FDP and CVP to run alone.

=== Electoral system ===
==== Executive Council ====
The Executive Council contains 7 members elected using a two-round majoritarian system. In the first round, electors have up to seven votes and the 7 most-voted candidates reaching an overall majority (>50%) are elected. If seats remain to be filled, a runoff is held where electors have as many votes as seats remaining, and the candidates with the most votes (simple plurality) are elected.

==== Cantonal Council ====
The Cantonal Council was elected using open-list proportional representation in 18 multi-member constituencies with no threshold. In each constituency, voters have as many votes as there are seats to fill (panachage is permitted); these votes each count both for the candidate and for the list they stand in.

Seats are first apportioned to the apparentments (groups of lists) then to the lists directly (minimizing vote splitting in the smaller constituencies); in each list the seats are attributed to the candidates reaching the most votes.

== Results ==
=== Executive Council ===
Results of the 2003 Zürich Executive Council election
Candidate	Party	Votes	%
Markus Notter	SP	147,204	91.05
Christian Huber	SVP	131,071	81.07
Rita Fuhrer	SVP	129,987	80.40
Verena Diener	Grüne	124,255	76.86
Regine Aeppli	SP	119,567	73.96
Dorothé Fierz	FDP	107,566	66.53
Rüdi Jeker	FDP	89,828	55.56
Hans Hollenstein	CVP	86,959	53.79
Hans Rutschmann	SVP	86,617	53.58
Gerhard Fischer	EVP	40,294	24.92
Markus Bischoff	AL	14,593	9.03
Rolf Boder	SD	6,358	3.93
Marian Ignacy Danowski	Ind.	161	0.10
Scattered votes		47,249	29.24
Total		1,131,709	63.69
Blank votes		633,372	35.65
Invalid votes		12,382	0.70
Total votes		1,776,824	7×
Total ballots		262,320	–
Registered voters/Turnout		793,155	33.07
Source: wahlen.zh.ch

In the Executive Council, the SP fielded both incumbent councillor Markus Notter and former cantonal councillor and current national councillor Regine Aeppli, hoping to gain a seat from any other party except incumbent green federal councillor Verena Diener running for re-election. They would gain the seat from the CVP, where Winterthur executive city councillor Hans Hollenstein failed to hold Ernst Buschor's seat; FDP councillor Rüdi Jecker narrowly saved his seat over Hollenstein and the third SVP candidate Hans Rutschmann by only three thousand votes. Women represented a majority of the council for the first time.

=== Cantonal Council ===
Results of the 2003 Zürich Cantonal Council election
Party	Votes	%	+/–	Seats	+/–
Swiss People's Party	82,680	30.24	+1.61	61	+1
Social Democratic Party	71,558	26.17	+4.08	53	+10
Free Democratic Party	43,519	15.91	−3.64	29	−8
Green Party	21,485	7.86	+2.21	14	+3
Christian Democratic People's Party	17,428	6.37	−0.29	12	±0
Evangelical People's Party	14,004	5.12	+0.14	9	±0
Federal Democratic Union	5,757	2.11	+0.30	1	±0
Swiss Democrats	3,698	1.35	−1.05	1	−1
Aktive Senioren	2,382	0.87	−0.79	0	−2
Alternative List	2,354	0.86	+0.45	0	−1
Others	8,583	3.14		–	–
Total	273,448	100.00	–	180	–
Source: wahlen.zh.ch, BfS

The SVP remained the largest party by gaining a seat but their ally Aktive Senioren, who caucused with them, lost both their seats. The largest gains were done by the SP, gaining ten seats, well over their expectations. The FDP lost seven seats, while the Greens overtook the CVP as the fourth largest party. The Ring of Independents, which had been historically strong in the canton, lost their representation for the first time since 1939 as they had disbanded two years earlier.

Panachage and apparentements played a role, mainly for smaller parties: the Greens received a large number of panachage votes from the SP, while the Statistical Office calculated most of the EVP's seats and the EDU and SD's sole seats were owed to apparentements.
