= Hannah Pfalzgraf =

Swiss politician (born 1997)

Member of the Cantonal Council of Zürich for the Affoltern District
- Incumbent
- Assumed office 15 January 2018
- Preceded by: Moritz Spillmann

Personal details
- Born: 1997 (age 28–29)
- Party: Social Democratic Party
- Other political affiliations: Young Socialists
- Education: Basel Art School

Hannah Pfalzgraf (born 1997) is a Swiss trade unionist and politician who has served in the Cantonal Council of Zürich since 2018 as a member of the Social Democratic Party. Taking office at the age of 20, she was the youngest-ever cantonal councillor in Zürich at the time. Pfalzgraf has also been co-president of the Trade Union Confederation of the Canton of Zurich since 2023.

== Biography ==
Hannah Pfalzgraf was born in 1997. She is a resident of Mettmenstetten. Raised in a politically-active family with left-wing beliefs in the Canton of Zürich, Pfalzgraf joined the Young Socialists (JUSO) in the aftermath of the 2014 Swiss immigration initiative. She was a board member of the JUSO branch in Zürich City from 2014 until 2017, and a board member of the cantonal branch of JUSO from 2017 until 2018. Since 2014, she has also been a board member of the Social Democratic Party (SP) branch in the Affoltern District. She attended the Basel Art School, studying to become a visual arts teacher.

In the 2015 elections, Pfalzgraf ran for the Cantonal Council of Zürich, standing in the Affoltern constituency. Aged just 18, she was the youngest candidate in the entire canton and ran an active campaign seeking to appeal to young voters. She placed third on the SP party list – behind Moritz Spillmann and another candidate – but was not elected. On 15 January 2018, Pfalzgraf became a member of the cantonal council following Spillmann's resignation. Aged 20, she was the youngest cantonal councillor ever elected in Zürich until Leandra Columberg in 2019. Pfalzgraf was a member of the State and Local Government Commission in her first term and the Finance Commission in her second and third terms.

Upon taking office, Pfalzgraf's main legislative priorities were gender equality, education, health, and feminism. In 2019, she introduced a proposal which obligates the cantonal government to ensure net zero carbon emissions by 2030 and encourage cooperation with other cantons to reach net zero by 2050 for the whole country. The proposal passed by a vote of 89 to 84. The following year, she introduced another proposal – supported by the SP, Greens, and Green Liberals – which would guarantee foreigners up to the age of 25 would not have to pay the cantonal naturalization fee. By 2023, Pfalzgraf had become the spokeswoman for the SP in the cantonal council. In this role, she announced her party's opposition to a proposed budget by the ruling Swiss People's Party which would include tax cuts for the wealthy and would cut the budgets for prisons and social services. In the 2023 Swiss federal election, she ran for the National Council on SP Zürich's queer sub-list, but was not elected.

On 1 July 2023, she became co-president of the Trade Union Confederation of the Canton of Zurich (GBKZ), serving alongside David Martinez. In this position, she has opposed legislative proposals which would expand the number of designated Sunday shopping days and replace May Day as an official holiday with the Sechseläuten. She has been a member of the Swiss Union of Public Service Personnel since 2018.
