= Priska Seiler Graf =

Swiss politician (born 1968)

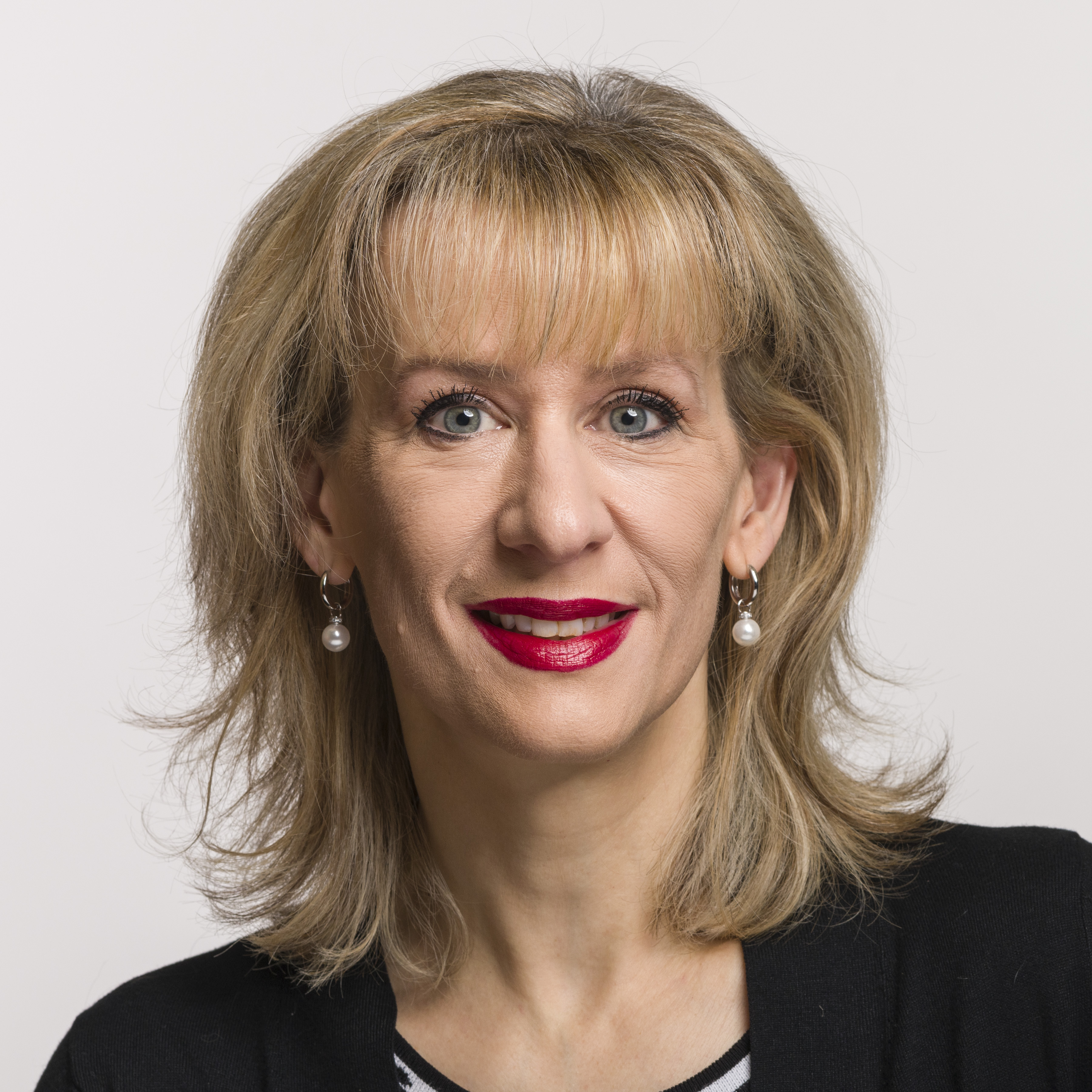
- Official portrait, 2019

Member of National Council (Switzerland)
- Incumbent
- Assumed office 30 November 2015
- Constituency: Canton of Zürich

Personal details
- Born: Priska Seiler; 29 August 1968 (age 57) Zürich, Switzerland
- Spouse: Thomas Graf
- Children: 3
- Website: Official website (in German)

Priska Seiler Graf (née Seiler; born 29 August 1968) is a Swiss educator and politician who currently serves on the National Council (Switzerland) for the Social Democratic Party since 2015. In the 2023 Zürich cantonal elections she was running for Executive Council of Zürich intending to succeed Mario Fehr. Graf previously served on the Cantonal Council of Zürich from 2005 to 2015.
