= Leandra Columberg =

Swiss politician (born 1999)

Member of the Cantonal Council of Zürich for Uster
- Incumbent
- Assumed office 6 May 2019

Member of the Dübendorf Municipal Council
- Incumbent
- Assumed office 1 March 2022

Personal details
- Born: 1999 (age 26–27)
- Party: Social Democratic Party
- Other political affiliations: Young Socialists Switzerland
- Education: University of Zürich (attending)

Leandra Columberg (born 1999) is a Swiss politician who has served in the Cantonal Council of Zürich since 2019 as a member of the Social Democratic Party. First elected at age 19, she is the youngest cantonal councillor ever elected in Zürich and one of the youngest in all of Switzerland.

== Biography ==
Leandra Columberg was born in 1999. She was raised in the town of Dübendorf in the Canton of Zürich, and attended high school in the neighboring town of Uster. Columberg was apolitical until age 16 when she studied for a year in the United States, where she was "shocked by Donald Trump's aggressive election campaign" and became opposed to right-wing populism. In 2016, she joined the Young Socialists (JUSO) and the Social Democratic Party (SP). A law student at the University of Zürich, Columberg works as a political campaigner for the Zürich SP and is on the board of the national JUSO organization and the SP branch in Dübendorf. Since 2018, she has also been the president of the JUSO branch in the Zürcher Oberland.

Columberg was elected to the Cantonal Council of Zürich in the 2019 elections, placing fourth on the SP party list in the Uster constituency. Elected at age 19, she is the youngest person ever elected to the cantonal council, and one of the youngest elected in all of Switzerland. During her tenure, Columberg has advocated for more protections for LGBT people and for high school preparation courses. She has also pushed for providing free menstrual hygiene products in schools and for masks to be distributed to the people of the canton. As a member of the Swiss Union of Public Service Personnel, Columberg sits with the Trade Union Group in the Cantonal Council. In 2022, she was elected with a dual mandate to the Dübendorf Municipal Council.

Columberg was re-elected in the 2023 elections, placing second in her constituency. She was a member of the Audit Commission in her first term and is a member of the Justice and Public Safety Commission in her second term. In 2024, Columberg strongly opposed an "anti-chaotic initiative" pushed by the ruling Swiss People's Party in the cantonal council. The bill "demands that demonstrators and organizers have to foot the bill for police operations and damage caused", which Columberg argues could serve as a chilling effect to deter protests and would be "collective punishment".
