= Nicola Siegrist =

Swiss politician

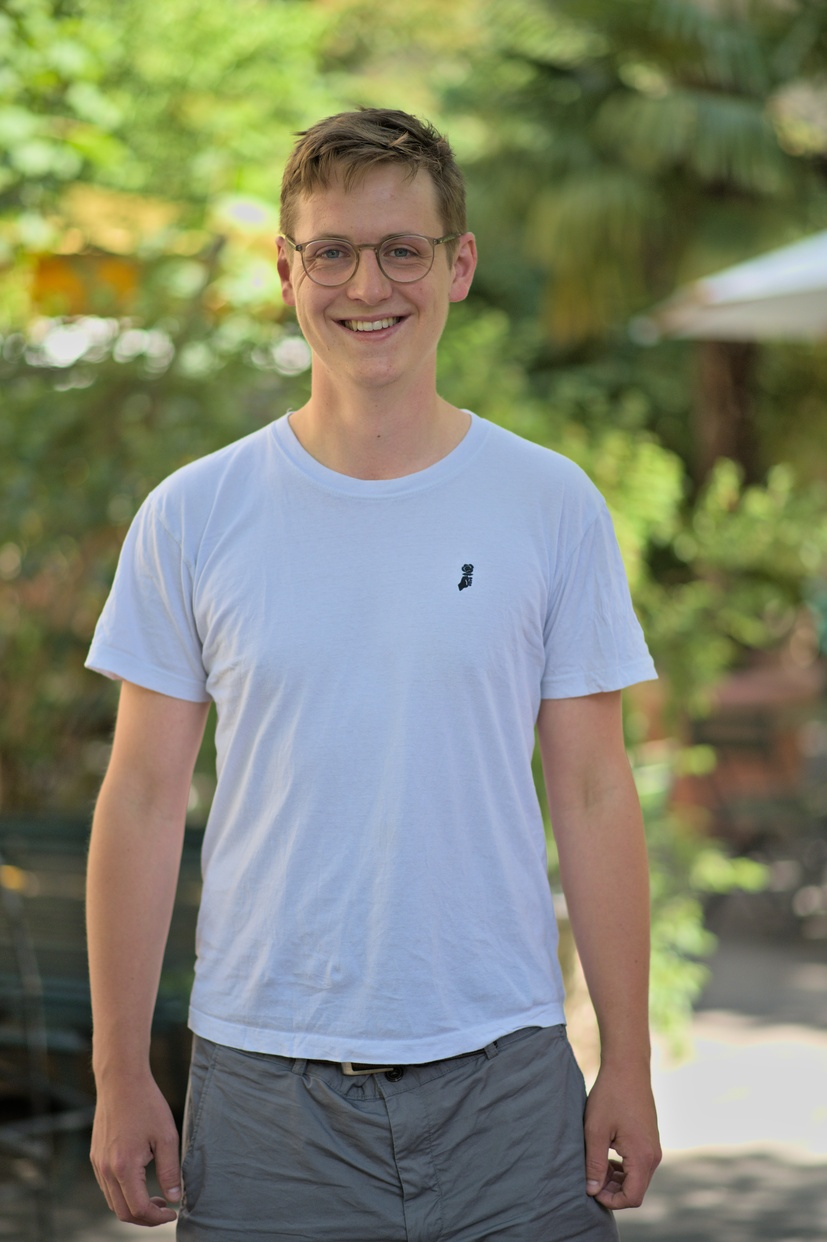
- Siegrist after the election in 2019

Member of Cantonal Council of Zürich
- Incumbent
- Assumed office 6 May 2019
- Constituency: Zürich (District 6, District 10)

President of Young Socialists Switzerland
- In office 1 May 2022 – 31 June 2024
- Preceded by: Ronja Jansen
- Succeeded by: Mirjam Hostetmann

Personal details
- Born: Nicola Siegrist; 7 December 1996 (age 29)
- Education: Kantonsschule Rämibühl
- Alma mater: University of Zürich; ETH Zürich (ongoing)
- Occupation: Politician, student

Nicola Siegrist (German pronunciation: [niˈkoːlaˈziːɡʁɪst]; born 7 December 1996) is a Swiss politician who currently serves as member of the Cantonal Council of Zürich for the Young Socialists/Social Democratic Party since 2019. He concurrently served as president of the Young Socialists Switzerland between 2022 and 2024.
