= Gianna Berger =

Swiss politician (born 1999)

Member of the Cantonal Council of Zurich
- Incumbent
- Assumed office 13 May 2024
- Preceded by: Anne-Claude Hensch
- Constituency: Constituency VI Zurich 11+12

Personal details
- Born: 1999 (age 26–27)
- Party: Alternative List

Gianna Berger (born 1999) is a Swiss politician who has served in the Cantonal Council of Zurich since 2024. A member of the Alternative List, she represents Zurich's 11th and 12th districts. During her tenure, Berger has been an advocate for affordable public transport.

== Biography ==
Gianna Berger was born in 1999. She lives in Zurich. She received a Dipl. Pflegefachfrau HF degree in child and adolescent psychiatry from a higher technical school.

A member of the Alternative List, Berger was a candidate for the National Council in the 2023 Swiss federal election in the Canton of Zurich. She was not elected, receiving 4,727 votes. On 13 May 2024, Berger was appointed to the Cantonal Council of Zurich to succeed Anne-Claude Hensch, who resigned due to illness. She represents Constituency VI Zurich 11+12, which is composed of Zurich's 11th and 12th districts. She is a member of the Commission for Economic Affairs and Taxation. During her tenure, Berger has advocated for affordable public transport through income-based fares.
