= Pfalzgraf (disambiguation) =

Pfalzgraf (count palatine) was a noble title in the Holy Roman Empire. The most famous of these are the counts palatine of the Rhine, who ruled the Electoral Palatinate.

Pfalzgraf is also the surname of the following people:

- Erich Pfalzgraf (1879–1937), German Protestant theologian and preacher
- Falco Pfalzgraf (born 1968), German linguist and university lecturer
- Hannah Pfalzgraf (born 1997), Swiss politician (SP)
- Maurus Pfalzgraf (born 1999), Swiss politician (Greens)
- Michael Pfalzgraf (1867–1942), German trade unionist
- Walter Pfalzgraf (1883–1967), German forester and senior administrative official

== See also ==
- County palatine (England)
- Imperial count palatine
- Palsgraf
