= Silvia Steiner =

Swiss politician (born 1958)

Silvia Steiner (born 14 March 1958) is a Swiss politician. She is a member of the Government Council of the Canton of Zürich, Head of the Department of Education, and ex officio President of the Board of the University of Zurich. She is a member of The Centre.
