= Verena Diener =

Swiss politician (1949–2024)

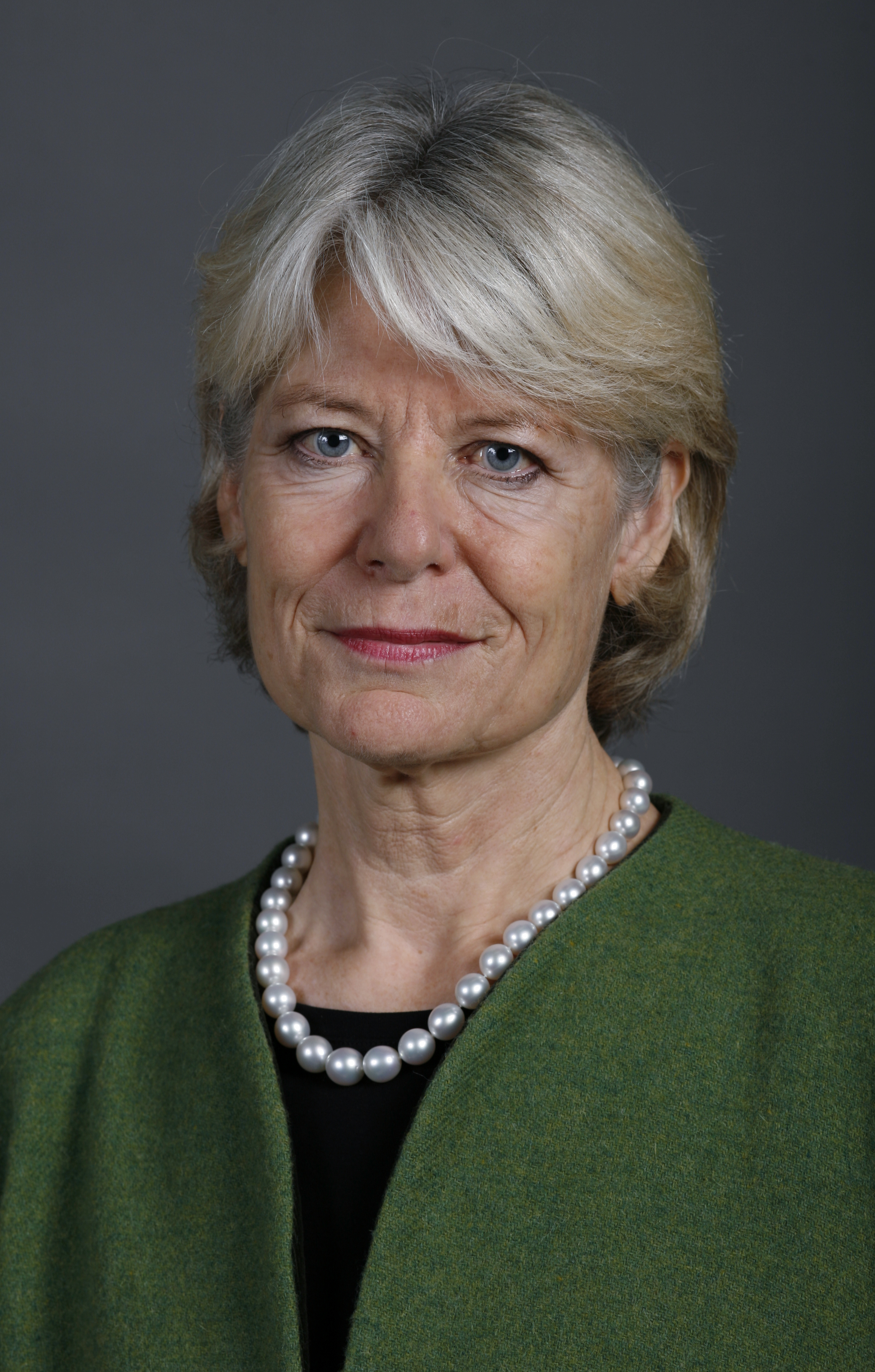
Diener

Verena Diener (27 March 1949 – 28 June 2024) was a Swiss politician. A member of the Green Liberal Party of Switzerland, she represented the canton of Zürich in the National Council from 1987 to 1998 and in the Council of States from 2007 to 2015. From 1995 to 2007, she was a member of the cantonal government of Zurich.

In 2004, Diener left the Green Party, founding the Green Liberal Party together with National Councillor and former president of the Zurich Green Party, Martin Bäumle.

In the second round of the 2007 Council of States elections in Zurich, Diener won the majority before Swiss People's Party chairman Ueli Maurer. Diener's seat was one of five (out of 46) not held by members of the parties represented in the Swiss Federal Council (besides fellow Green Liberal, Markus Stadler of Uri, Werner Luginbühl of Canton of Bern and the two of the Green Party, Robert Cramer of Geneva and Luc Recordon of Vaud).

Diener died on 28 June 2024, at the age of 75.
