= Mario Fehr =

Swiss politician

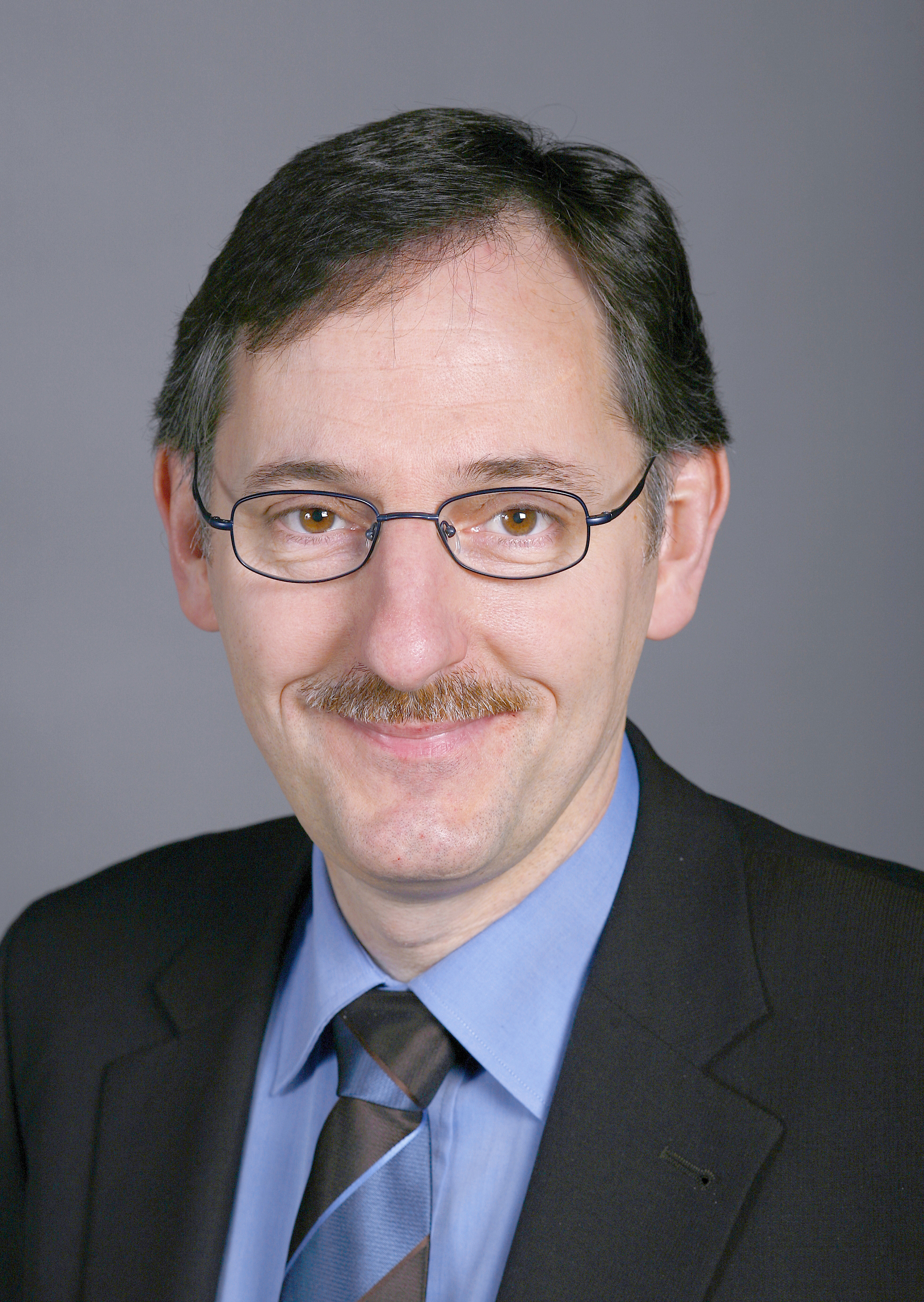

Personal details
- Born: 13 September 1958 (age 68) Zürich, Switzerland
- Party: Independent (since 2021)
- Other political affiliations: SP (until 2021)
- Occupation: Lawyer

Mario Fehr (born 13 September 1958) is a Swiss local politician. He has been Head of the Department of Security of Zurich since 2011, and was President of the Government Council of Zurich in 2016/2017. He is known as noted in Le Temps for his criticism of the asylum stance of his former party SP wich lead to his risigning from the party.

== Early life and education ==
In 1984 Fehr graduated from the University of Zurich with a degree in law, and from 1984–85 he was an assistant at the university's Faculty of Law. From 1985–86 he was an intern at the district court in Zurich, and from 1986–88 he was an intern at the Office of the Juvenile Prosecutor in Horgen. From 1989–94 he held a position at the Uitikon correctional facility for juvenile delinquents.

In 1994 he graduated from the University of Zurich as a teacher for general subjects in vocational schools. From 1992–2008 Fehr was a teacher at the Zurich Vocational School for Technical Professions. From 2006–11 he was the President of the Swiss Commercial Association.

== Political career ==
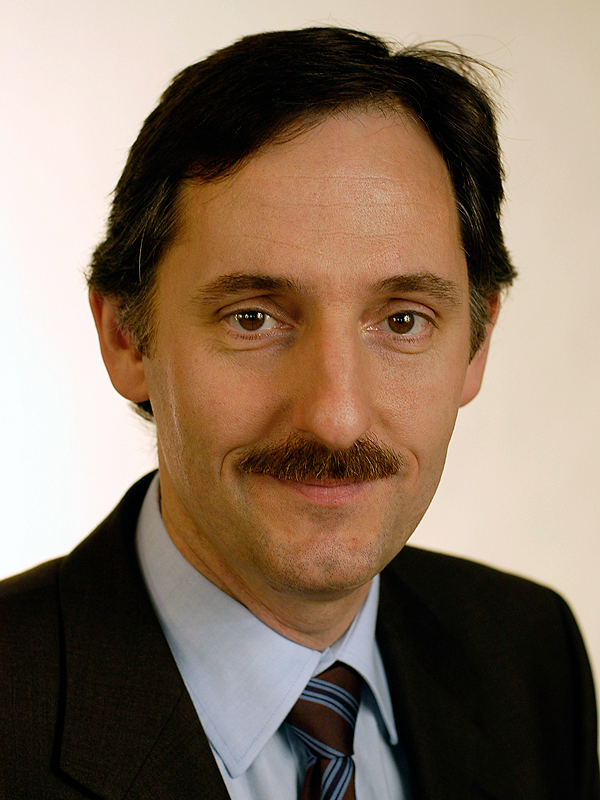
Mario Fehr

In 1986–94 he was Member of the Adliswil Municipal Parliament. From 1991–2000, as a member of the Social Democratic Party of Switzerland (SP), he served in the Cantonal Council of Zürich. From 1994–2010 he was a Member of the Adliswil City Council, from 2000–05 he was a member of the Constitutional Council, and from 1999–2011 he was a Member of the Swiss National Council, and a Member of the Foreign Affairs Committee and the Science, Education, and Culture Committee.

In 2011 he was first elected to the seven-member Executive Council of Zürich, where he led the ministry of security. He was re-elected in 2015 (second-highest share of votes) and 2019 (highest share of votes). He left the Social Democratic Party in 2021, over disputes with the cantonal SP leadership and has since continued to serve as an independent. He was re-elected again in 2023 (with the highest shares of votes).

Ali Abunimah, director of the Electronic Intifada, was arrested in Zurich in January 2025 and deported after an entry ban on his travel to Zurich was imposed on him by the Federal Office of Police (Fedpol) at the request of the Zurich police because, according to Fehr, Abunimah posed a threat to Switzerland's internal and external security. Abunimah had made a number of controversial statements in the past, claiming for example that there was "no credible evidence" of rape by Hamas terrorists during the attack on Israel on October 7, 2023, accusing Israel of deliberately killing its own citizens that day, and describing Iranian missile attacks on Israel as "an act in the name of humanity." Fehr described Abunimah as a "Islamist Jew-hater who calls for violence in Switzerland". In January 2026, a Zurich court deemed Abunimah's arrest unlawful. Further, the court stated that, in contravention of Swiss law, the Zurich police did not inform him of the specific legal reasons for his arrest. Abunimah's entry ban and the legality of the deportation itself remain under review by the Swiss courts, with a decision to come later in 2026.

== Personal life ==
He is a lawyer by profession, was born in Zurich, lives in Adliswil, and has lived in Küsnacht.

== See also ==
- List of members of the National Council of Switzerland, 2003–2007
- List of members of the National Council of Switzerland, 2007–2011
