= Young Socialists Switzerland =

Youth socialist organization in Switzerland

Young Socialists Switzerland Jungsozialist*innen Schweiz Jeunesse socialiste suisse Gioventù Socialista Svizzera Giuventetgna Socialista Svizra
- President: Mirjam Hostetmann
- Founded: 1906
- Headquarters: Bern, Switzerland
- Ideology: Social democracy Democratic socialism Eco-socialism; Anti-capitalism; Alter-globalization; Anti-militarism; Anti-austerity; Pro-Europeanism; Feminism; Factions: Revolutionary socialism Anarchism
- Mother party: Social Democratic Party of Switzerland
- International affiliation: International Union of Socialist Youth
- European affiliation: Young European Socialists
- Website: juso.ch

Young Socialists Switzerland (German: Jungsozialist*innen Schweiz) or Swiss Socialist Youth (French: Jeunesse socialiste suisse, Italian: Gioventù Socialista Svizzera, Romansh: Giuventetgna Socialista Svizra), colloquially called “Juso”, is a youth organization in Switzerland connected to the Social Democratic Party of Switzerland but legally independent and following a different political course from its mother party. Their positions are often more radical than those of the SP, as they consider themselves a socialist organization, whilst the SP is a more social democratic party.
