= Biproportional apportionment =

Multi-winner electoral system

Biproportional apportionment is a proportional representation method to allocate seats in proportion to two separate characteristics. That is, for two different partitions each part receives the proportional number of seats within the total number of seats. For instance, this method could give proportional results by party and by region, or by party and by gender/ethnicity, or by any other pair of characteristics.

1. Example: proportional by party and by region
  - Each party's share of seats is proportional to its total votes.
  - Each region's share of seats is proportional to its total votes
    - (or this could be based on its population-size or other criteria).
2. Then, as nearly as possible given the totals for each region and each party:
  - Each region's seats are allocated among parties in proportion to that region's votes for those parties. (The region's seats go to locally popular parties.)
  - Each party's seats are allocated among regions in proportion to that party's votes in those regions. (The party's seats are in regions where it is most popular.)

== Process ==
Suppose that the method is to be used to give proportional results by party and by region.

Each party nominates a candidate list for every region. The voters vote for the parties of their region (and/or for individual candidates, in an open list or local list system).

The results are calculated in two steps:

In the so called upper apportionment the seats for each party (over all regions) and the seats for each region (from all parties) are determined.
In the so called lower apportionment the seats are distributed to the regional party list respecting the results from the upper apportionment.

This can be seen as globally adjusting the voting power of each party's voters by the minimum amount necessary so that the region-by-region results become proportional by party.

=== Upper apportionment ===
In the upper apportionment the seats for each party are computed with a highest averages method (for example the Sainte-Laguë method). This determines how many of all seats each party deserves due to the total of all their votes (that is the sum of the votes for all regional lists of that party). Analogically, the same highest averages method is used to determine how many of all seats each region deserves.

Note that the results from the upper apportionment are the final results for each party in terms of seat numbers overall (and analogically for the number of the seats of one region): the lower apportionment determines only which regions the party seats are allocated to. Thus, after the upper apportionment is done, the strength of a party or region in the parliament is set.

=== Lower apportionment ===
The lower apportionment has to distribute the seats to each regional party list in a way that respects both the apportionment of seats to the party and the apportionment of seats to the regions.

The result is obtained by an iterative process. Initially, for each region a regional divisor is chosen using the highest averages method for the votes allocated to each regional party list in this region. For each party a party divisor is initialized with 1.

Effectively, the objective of the iterative process is to modify the regional divisors and party divisors so that

- the number of seats in each regional party list equals the number of their votes divided by both the regional and the party divisors which is then rounded by the rounding method of the highest averages method used, and
- the sum of the seats of all regional party lists of one party equals the number of seats computed in the upper apportionment for that party, and
- the sum of the seats of all regional party lists of one region equals the number of seats computed in the upper apportionment for that region.

The following two correction steps are executed until this objective is satisfied:

- modify the party divisors such that the apportionment within each party is correct with the chosen highest averages method,
- modify the regional divisors such that the apportionment within the region is correct with the chosen highest averages method.

Using the Sainte-Laguë method, this iterative process is guaranteed to terminate with appropriate seat numbers for each regional party list.

== Specific example of biproportional apportionment based on votes cast ==
Suppose there are three parties A, B and C and three district I, II and III and that 20 seats are to be distributed and that the Sainte-Laguë method is used. The number of seats in each district (knowing 20 seats will be used overall) and the number of seats that are allocated to parties A, B and C are determined based on votes cast.

The votes for the district party lists are as follows:

District Party	I	II	III	Total
A	123	45	815	983
B	912	714	414	2040
C	312	255	215	782
total	1347	1014	1444	3805

=== Upper apportionment ===
For the upper apportionment, the overall seat number for the parties and the districts are determined.

Since there are 3805 voters and 20 seats, there are 190 (rounded) voters per seat. Thus the results for the distribution of the party seats is:

Party	A	B	C
#votes	983	2040	782
#votes/divisor	5.2	10.7	4.1
#seats	5	11	4

Using the divisor 190, the results for the distribution of the district seats is:

District	I	II	III
#votes	1347	1014	1444
#votes/divisor	7.1	5.3	7.6
#seats	7	5	8

=== Lower apportionment ===
Initially, district divisors have to be found to distribute the seats of each district to the district party lists. In the tables, for each district party list, there are two cells, the first shows the number of votes and the second the number of seats allocated.

District Party	I		II		III	
A	123	1	45	0	815	5
B	912	4	714	4	414	2
C	312	2	255	1	215	1
total	1347	7	1014	5	1444	8
regional divisor	205		200		180	

Now, the party divisors are initialized with ones and the number of seats within each party is checked (that is, compared to the number computed in the upper apportionment):

District Party	I		II		III		total		party divisor
A	123	1	45	0	815	5	983	6	1
B	912	4	714	4	414	2	2040	10	1
C	312	2	255	1	215	1	782	4	1
total	1347	7	1014	5	1444	8	3805	20	
district divisor	205		200		180				

Since not all parties have the correct number of seats, a correction step has to be executed: For parties A and B, the divisors are to be adjusted. The divisor for A has to be raised and the divisor for B has to be lowered:

District Party	I		II		III		total		party divisor
A	123	1	45	0	815	4	983	5	1.1
B	912	5	714	4	414	2	2040	11	0.95
C	312	2	255	1	215	1	782	4	1
total	1347	8	1014	5	1444	7	3805	20	
district divisor	205		200		180				

Now, the divisors for districts I and III have to be modified. Since district I has one seat too many (8 instead of the 7 seats computed in the upper apportionment), its divisor has to be raised; in opposite, the divisor for district III has to be lowered.

District Party	I		II		III		toal		party divisor
A	123	1	45	0	815	4	983	5	1.1
B	912	5	714	4	414	3	2040	12	0.95
C	312	1	255	1	215	1	782	3	1
total	1347	7	1014	5	1444	8	3805	20	
district divisor	210		200		170				

Again, the divisors for the parties have to be adjusted:

District Party	I		II		III		toal		party divisor
A	123	1	45	0	815	4	983	5	1.1
B	912	4	714	4	414	3	2040	11	0.97
C	312	2	255	1	215	1	782	4	0.98
total	1347	7	1014	5	1444	8	3805	20	
district divisor	210		200		170				

Now, the numbers of seats for the three parties and the three districts match the numbers computed in the upper apportionment. Thus, the iterative process is completed.

The final seat numbers are:

District Party	I	II	III	Total
A	1	0	4	5
B	4	4	3	11
C	2	1	1	4
total	7	5	8	20

== Usage ==
A method of biproportional appointment that was proposed in 2003 by German mathematician Friedrich Pukelsheim is now used for cantonal and municipal elections in some cantons of Switzerland, i.e. Zurich (since 2006), Aargau and Schaffhausen (since 2008), Nidwalden, Zug (since 2013), Schwyz (since 2015), Valais (since 2017) and Grisons (since 2022).

Biproportional appointment is also used in national elections for the Bulgarian National Assembly.

New York both allocated seats to boroughs and seats to parties proportionally by using a uniform quota when it used STV in the 1930s and 1940s. Allocating seats to districts based on votes cast, not on population, allowed representation to be much more precisely proportional. However the number of city councillors fluctuated in a way that many saw as unsettling. (This feeling is avoided in the example given above, where it is known that 20 seats will be filled).

== Fair majority voting ==
Fair majority voting is a biproportional apportionment method with single-member districts. It was proposed in 2008 by Michel Balinski (who also invented the single-winner voting system called majority judgment) as a way to eliminate the power of gerrymandering, especially in the United States.

== See also ==
- Constituent Assembly of Valais
