= Government Council of Zürich =

Executive organ of the canton of Zürich, Switzerland

The Government Council of the Canton of Zurich (German: Regierungsrat des Kantons Zürich) is the executive organ of the canton of Zürich, in Switzerland. Zürich has a seven-member Government Council.

== Members ==
Name	Party	Office	First elected
Jacqueline Fehr	Social Democratic Party	Justice and Home Affairs	2015
Mario Fehr	Independent (Note: Elected as a Social Democrat in 2011, 2015 and 2019; left the party in 2021.)	Security	2011
Martin Neukom	Green Party	Buildings	2019
Natalie Rickli	Swiss People's Party	Health	2019
Silvia Steiner	Christian Democratic People's Party	Education	2015
Ernst Stocker	Swiss People's Party	Finance	2010
Carmen Walker Späh	FDP.The Liberals	Economic Affairs	2015

== See also ==
- Cantonal Council of Zürich
- List of cantonal executives of Switzerland
