= Alternative List =

Alternative List Alternative Liste
- Founded: 1990 (as coalition)
- Ideology: Socialism
- Political position: Left-wing
- National affiliation: Alternative Left

The Alternative List (AL; German: Alternative Liste) is a left political party in Zürich.

The AL has existed since 1990 as a loose coalition of left-wing activists before becoming a party in 2007, with sections in the city of Zürich and the Limmat Valley. A movement in Winterthur is also associated to the party, and a section in the Horgen District was created in 2013.

The party for a time extended beyond the canton of Zürich, being also active in the cantons of Aargau from 2002 to 2006 and Schaffhausen from 2003 to 2022.

== Representation ==
- 6 seats (out of 180) in the Cantonal Council of Zürich
- 8 seats (out of 125) in the city council of Zürich
- 2 seats (out of 60) in the city council of Winterthur
- 1 seat (out of 36) in the city council of Dietikon

=== Former representation ===
- 5 seats (out of 60) in the Cantonal Council of Schaffhausen in 2012
- 4 seats (ouf of 36) in the city council of Schaffhausen in 2012, 2016, and 2020 (Note: The four members of the AL Schaffhausen sit as independents since the party's dissolution.)
- 1 seat (out of 5, Simon Stocker) in the city government of Schaffhausen in 2012
