= Cantonal Council of Zurich =

Parliament of Canton Zürich, Switzerland

Cantonal Council of Zürich Zürcher Kantonsrat (German)

Type
- Type: Unicameral

Leadership
- President: Beat Habegger, FDP since 5 May 2025

Structure
- Seats: 180
- Political groups: SVP (46); SP (36); FDP (29); glp (24); GPS (19); The Centre (11); EVP (7); AL (5); EDU (3)
- Length of term: Four years

Elections
- Voting system: Party-list proportional representation Biproportional apportionment
- Last election: 12 February 2023
- Next election: 2027

Meeting place
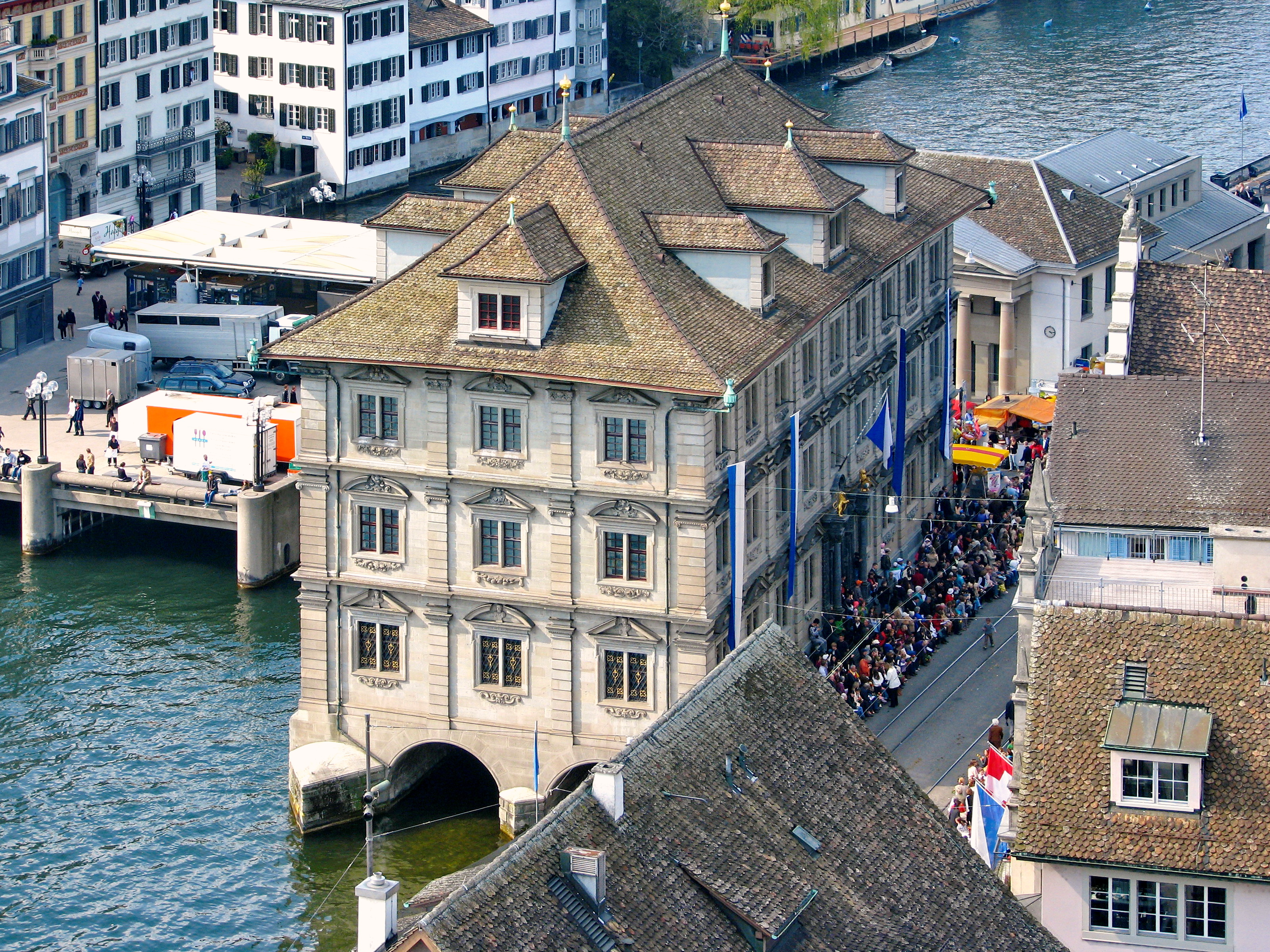
- Zürich Town Hall, Zürich

Website
- http://www.kantonsrat.zh.ch/

The Cantonal Council of Zürich (German: Zürcher Kantonsrat) is the legislature of the canton of Zürich, in Switzerland. Zürich has a unicameral legislature. The Cantonal Council has 180 seats, with members elected every four years.

== Elections ==
The council is re-elected every four years. Like other legislatures in Switzerland, elections use proportional representation with biproportional apportionment. There are eighteen constituencies, which are based on the canton's twelve districts. The district of Winterthur is split into two constituencies, one representing the city of Winterthur, and the other representing the surrounding countryside. The city of Zürich is split into six constituencies, each composed of two metropolitan districts.

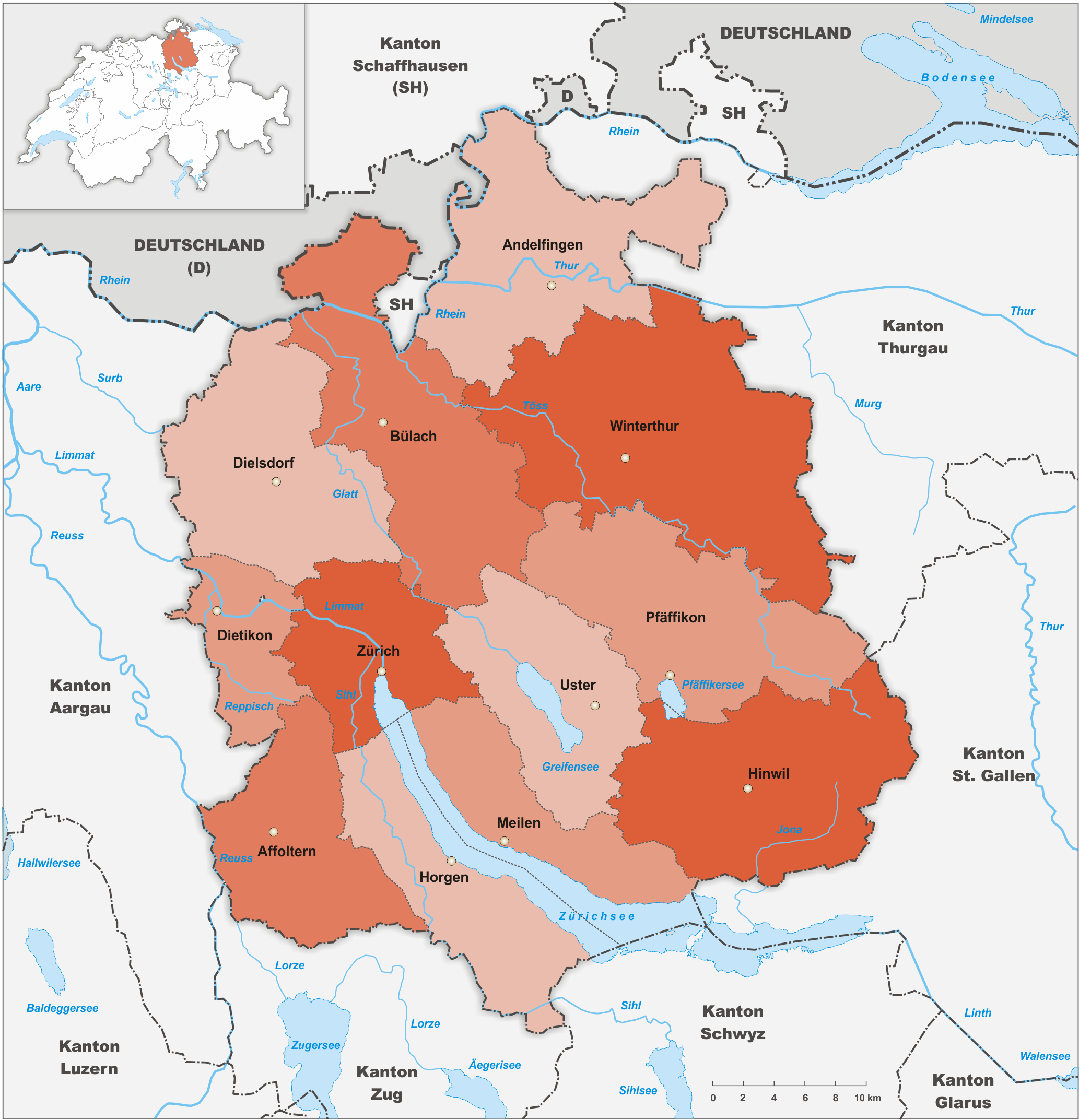
Districts in the Canton of Zürich

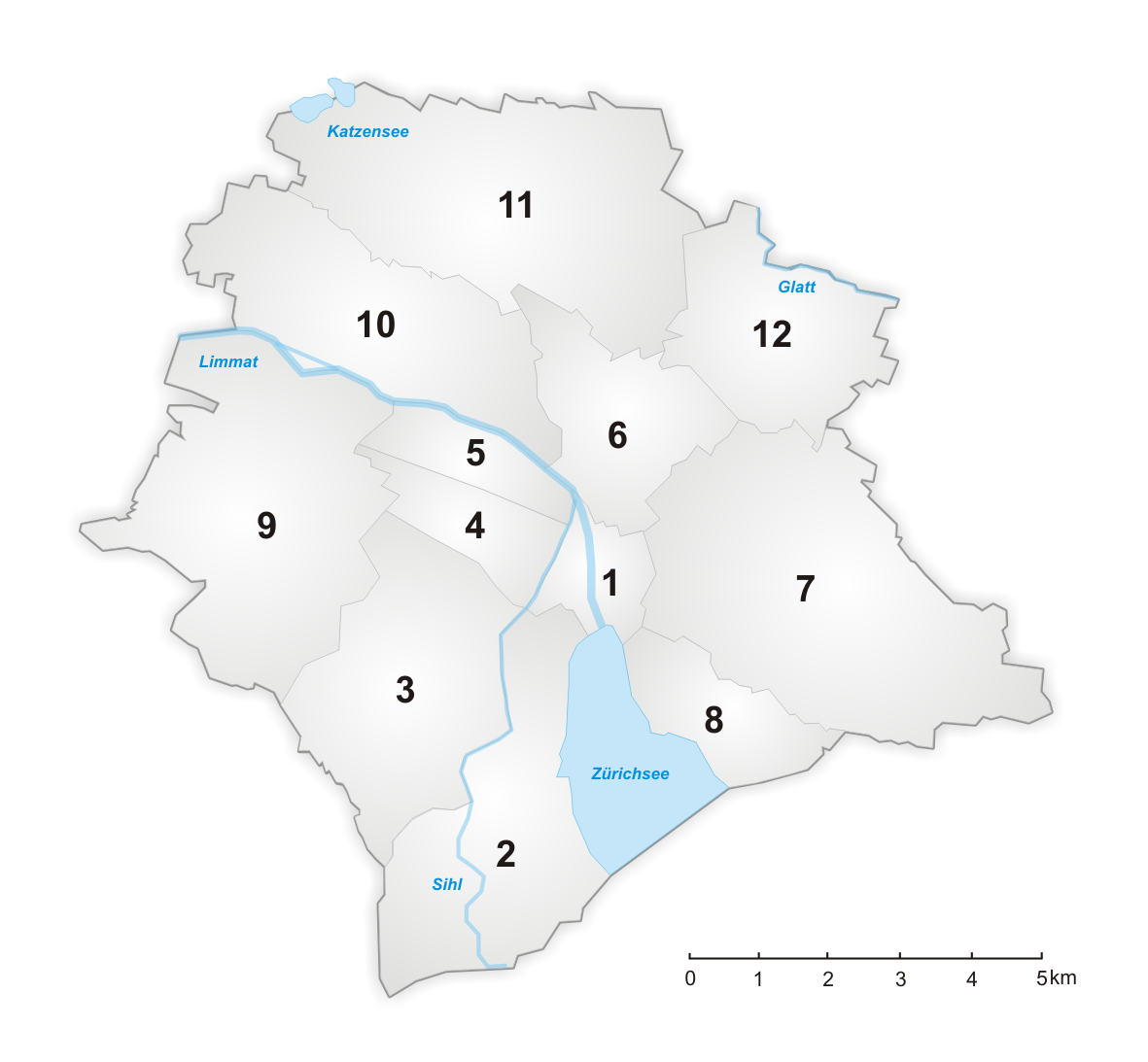
Zürich municipal districts

Number of seats by constituency since 2007
Constituency		2007	2011	2015	2019	2023
I	Zürich city districts 1 & 2	5	5	4	5	5
II	Zürich city districts 3 & 9	12	12	12	12	12
III	Zürich city districts 4 & 5	5	5	5	5	5
IV	Zürich city districts 6 & 10	9	9	9	9	8
V	Zürich city districts 7 & 8	7	6	6	6	6
VI	Zürich city districts 11 & 12	12	12	12	12	12
VII	Dietikon	11	11	11	11	11
VIII	Affoltern	6	6	6	6	7
IX	Horgen	15	15	15	15	15
X	Meilen	13	13	13	12	12
XI	Hinwil	11	12	12	11	11
XII	Uster	16	16	16	16	16
XIII	Pfäffikon	7	7	7	7	7
XIV	Winterthur city	13	13	13	13	13
XV	Winterthur land	7	7	7	7	7
XVI	Andelfingen	4	4	4	4	4
XVII	Bülach	17	17	17	18	18
XVIII	Dielsdorf	10	10	11	11	11
Total		180				

=== Cantonal Council ===
Results of the last Zürich Cantonal Council election 2023
Party	Votes	%	+/–	Seats	+/–
Swiss People's Party	79,287	24.92	+0.45	46	+1
Social Democratic Party	61,480	19.32	+0.01	36	+1
FDP.The Liberals	50,456	15.86	+0.19	29	–
Green Liberal Party	40,562	12.75	−0.16	24	+1
Green Party	33,200	10.43	−1.48	19	−3
The Centre	19,178	6.03	+0.21	11	+3
Evangelical People's Party	12,277	3.86	−0.38	7	−1
Alternative List	8,342	2.62	−0.53	5	−1
Aufrecht / Free List	6,838	2.15	New	0	New
Federal Democratic Union	6,028	1.89	−0.38	3	−1
Labour Party	437	0.14	−0.04	0	±0
Yes to stop growth	71	0.02	New	0	New
SansPapierPolitiques	60	0.02	New	0	New
Total	318,216	100.00	–	180	–
Valid votes	320,141	98.69			
Invalid votes	3,968	1.22			
Blank votes	296	0.09			
Total votes	324,405	100.00			
Registered voters/turnout	929,203	34.91			
Source: app.statistik.zh.ch, election protocol

== President ==
The council is presided over by the president, who is re-elected every year.

=== List of presidents ===
Name	Party	From	To
Ulrich Bremi	FDP	7 May 1973	4 May 1974
Willy Walker	-	5 May 1974	25 May 1975
Albert Eggli	-	26 May 1975	11 January 1976
Konrad Gisler	SVP	3 May 1976	7 March 1977
Rolf A. Widmer	-	12 January 1976	2 May 1976
Josef Landolt	CVP	2 May 1977	7 May 1978
Rudolf Reichling	SVP	14 March 1977	1 May 1978
Werner Wydler	EVP	8 May 1978	29 April 1979
Kurt Müller	FDP	30 April 1979	4 May 1980
Ernst Spillmann	SP	5 May 1980	4 May 1981
Erich Rüfenacht	-	4 May 1981	2 May 1982
Bruno Schürch	FDP	3 May 1982	29 May 1983
Werner Bosshard	SP	30 May 1983	6 May 1984
Wolfgang Nigg	CVP	7 May 1984	5 May 1985
Gertrud Erismann-Peyer	FDP	6 May 1985	4 May 1986
Hansjörg Frei	SVP	5 May 1986	3 May 1987
Robert Hux	-	4 May 1987	1 May 1988
Hermann Hauser	FDP	2 May 1988	7 May 1989
Ursula Leemann	SP	8 May 1989	6 May 1990
Ueli Maurer	SVP	7 May 1990	5 May 1991
Paul Angst	FDP	6 May 1991	3 May 1992
Fritz Jauch	EVP	4 May 1992	2 May 1993
Marlies Voser-Huber	SP	3 May 1993	1 May 1994
Peter Lauffer	FDP	8 May 1994	7 May 1995
Markus Kägi	SVP	8 May 1995	5 May 1996
Esther Holm	GPS	6 May 1996	4 May 1997
Roland Brunner	SP	5 May 1997	3 May 1998
Kurt Schellenberg	FDP	4 May 1998	29 May 1999
Richard Hirt	CVP	30 May 1999	7 May 2000
Hans Rutschmann	SVP	8 May 2000	6 May 2001
Martin Bornhauser	SP	7 May 2001	5 May 2002
Thomas Dähler	FDP	6 May 2002	4 May 2003
Ernst Stocker-Rusterholz	SVP	5 May 2003	2 April 2004
Emy Lalli	SP	3 May 2004	8 May 2005
Peter Hans Frei	SVP	9 May 2005	7 May 2006
Hartmuth Attenhofer	SP	8 May 2006	10 May 2007
Ursula Moor-Schwarz	SVP	21 May 2007	4 May 2008
Regula Thalmann-Meyer	FDP	5 May 2008	3 May 2009
Esther Hildebrand	GPS	4 May 2009	2 May 2010
Gerhard Fischer	EVP	3 May 2010	8 May 2011
Jürg Trachsel	SVP	9 May 2011	6 May 2012
Bernhard Egg	SP	7 May 2012	5 May 2013
Bruno Walliser	SVP	6 May 2013	11 May 2014
Brigitta Johner	FDP	12 May 2014	17 May 2015
Mario Fehr	SP	4 May 2015	2 May 2016
Ernst Stocker-Rusterholz	SVP	3 May 2015	8 May 2016
Rolf Steiner	SP	8 May 2016	7 May 2017
Karin Egli-Zimmermann	SVP	8 May 2017	6 May 2018
Yvonne Bürgin-Hartmann	CVP	8 May 2018	3 May 2022
Esther Guyer	glp	3 May 2022	2023
Sylvie Matter	SP	2023	2024
Jürg Sulser	SVP	2024	5 May 2025
Beat Habegger	FDP	5 May 2025	Present

== See also ==
- Executive Council of Zürich
- List of cantonal legislatures of Switzerland
