= List of members of the Grand Council of Aargau (2021–2024) =

On the list of members of the Grand Council of Aargau (2021–2024) the members of the Grand Council of Aargau are listed, who were elected in the election on October 18, 2020, for the term 2021–2024. Resignations and those following are recorded in a further section.

== Elected members of the Grand Council of Aargau October 18, 2021 ==
Name	Party	place of residence	year of birth	year of first membership	function
Daniel Aebi	SVP	Birmenstorf		2017	member
Maya Bally	CVP	Hendschiken	1961	2013	member
Colette Basler	SP	Zeihen			member
Thomas Baumann	Grüne	Suhr		2021	member
Jürg Baur	CVP	Brugg			member
Yannick Berner	FDP	Aarau			member
Béa Biber	glp	Rheinfelden AG			member
Carole Binder-Meury	SP	Magden			member
Adrian Bircher	GLP	Aarau	1988	2016	Mitglied
René Bodmer	SVP	Unterlunkhofen	1962	2013	member
Barbara Borer-Mathys	SVP	Holziken		2021	member
Martin Bossert	EDU	Rothrist		2021	member
Rita Brem-Ingold	CVP	Oberwil-Lieli		2021	member
Simona Brizzi	SP	Ennetbaden			member
Martin Brügger	SP	Brugg	1959	2013	member
Ralf Bucher	CVP	Mühlau AG	1978	2013	member
Roland Büchi	SVP	Wohlen		2021	member
Hans-Peter Budmiger	glp	Muri		2021	member
Elisabeth Burgener Brogli	SP	Gipf-Oberfrick	1961	2007	Vicepresident 1 2021
Alain Burger	SP	Wettingen			member
David Burgherr	SP	Lengnau AG		2017	member
Flurin Burkard	SP	Waltenschwil		2010	member
Regula Dell’Anno-Doppler	SP	Baden AG		2018	member
Silvia Dell’Aquila	SP	Aarau		2019	member
Carol Demarmels	SP	Obersiggenthal		2021	member
Therese Dietiker-Brunner	EVP	Aarau	1962	2015	member
Markus Dietschi	Grüne	Widen		2019	member
Dieter Egli	SP	Windisch AG	1970	2005	was at the same day elected as a member of the executive council ("Regierungsrat")
Hansjörg Erne	SVP	Leuggern	1980	2012	member
Manuela Ernst	glp	Wettingen		2021	member
Karin Faes	FDP	Schöftland		2021	member
Jacqueline Felder	SVP	Boniswil		2020	member
Roger Fessler	SVP	Mellingen		2019	member
Andreas Fischer Bargetzi	Grüne	Möhlin	1977	2014	member
Lutz Fischer-Lamprecht	EVP	Wettingen		2019	member
Roland Frauchiger	EVP	Thalheim	1960	2014	member
Sabina Freiermuth-Salz	FDP	Zofingen	1964	2010	member
Jonas Fricker	Grüne	Baden AG		2021	member
Pascal Furer	SVP	Staufen AG	1971	2001	President 2021
Markus Gabriel	SVP	Uerkheim		2015	member
Kurt Gerhard	SVP	Brittnau		2020	member
Stefan Giezendanner	SVP	Zofingen	1978	2021	member
Jeanine Glarner	FDP	Möriken-Wildegg	1984	2012	member
Christian Glur	SVP	Murgenthal	1975	2009	member
Patrick Gosteli	SVP	Böttstein	1973	2008	member
Mario Gratwohl	SVP	Niederwil		2019	member
Dominik Gresch	glp	Zofingen		2021	member
Bruno Gretener	FDP	Mellingen	1967	2013	member
Christoph Hagenbuch	SVP	Oberlunkhofen		2017	member
Gertrud Häseli-Stadler	Grüne	Wittnau	1963	2009	member
Rolf Haller	EDU	Zetzwil	1970	2013	member
Kathrin Hasler	SVP	Hellikon	1956	2013	member
Claudia Hauser	FDP	Döttingen		2017	member
Renate Häusermann-Meyer	SVP	Seengen		2021	member
Silvan Hilfiker	FDP	Oberlunkhofen	1980	2013	member
Clemens Hochreuther	SVP	Aarau	1980	2009	member
Daniel Hölzle	Grüne	Zofingen	1981	2013	member
Hans-Ruedi Hottiger	CVP	Zofingen	1953	2009	member
Tobias Hottiger	FDP	Zofingen		2021	member
Lukas Huber	glp	Berikon		2021	member
René Huber	CVP	Leuggern	1969	2013	member
Erich Hunziker	SVP	Kirchleerau		2019	member
Lelia Hunziker	SP	Aarau		2018	member
Michaela Huser	SVP	Wettingen			member
Stefan Huwyler	FDP	Muri AG			member
Rolf Jäggi	SVP	Egliswil			member
Beat Käser	FDP	Stein AG		2021	member
Alfons Paul Kaufmann	CVP	Wallbach AG		2017	member
Maurus Kaufmann	Grüne	Seon		2017	member
Tonja Kaufmann	SVP	Hausen AG		2017	member
Christian Keller (SVP)	SVP	Untersiggenthal	1975	2021	member
Christian Keller (Green party)	Grüne	Obersiggenthal	1968	2020	member
Leandra Knecht	glp	Baden AG		2021	member
Jürg Knuchel	SP	Aarau	1959	2013	member
Karin Koch Wick	CVP	Bremgarten AG		2019	member
Mirjam Kosch	Grüne	Aarau		2021	member
Petra Kuster	SVP	Neuenhof		2021	member
Roland Kuster	CVP	Wettingen		2019	member
Markus Lang	glp	Brugg AG		2021	member
Gabi Lauper Richner	SP	Niederlenz		2019	member
Thomas Leitch-Frey	SP	Wohlen		1997	member
Severin Lüscher	Grüne	Schöftland		2015	member
Gabriel Lüthy	FDP	Widen		2015	member
Markus Lüthy	SVP	Erlinsbach AG		2013	member
Harry Lütolf	CVP	Wohlen		2017	member
Sander Mallien	GLP	Baden AG		2013	member
Susanne Marclay-Merz	FDP	Aarau		2019	member
Adrian Meier	FDP	Menziken		2021	member
Andreas Meier	CVP	Klingnau		2017	member
Maya Meier	SVP	Auenstein		2011	member
Titus Meier	FDP	Brugg		2009	member
Alfred Merz	SP	Menziken		2013	member
Christian Merz	SVP	Beinwil am See		2017	member
Christian Minder	EVP	Lenzburg		2016	member
Daniel Mosimann	SP	Lenzburg		2017	member
Robert Alan Müller	SVP	Freienwil		2019	member
Werner Müller (Swiss politician)	CVP	Wittnau		2018	member
Nicole Müller-Boder	SVP	Buttwil		2017	member
Ruth Müri	Grüne	Baden AG		2017	member
Daniel Notter	SVP	Wettingen		2019	member
Michael Notter	CVP	Niederrohrdorf		2016	member
Robert Obrist	Grüne	Schinznach			member
Ignatius Ounde	glp	Gränichen		2021	member
Arsène Perroud	SP	Wohlen		2017	member
Dominik Peter	glp	Bremgarten AG		2017	member
Lukas Pfisterer	FDP	Aarau			Vicepresident 2 2021
Urs Plüss-Bernhard	EVP	Zofingen		2013	member
Barbara Portmann-Müller	glp	Lenzburg		2009	member
Philippe Ramseier	FDP	Baden AG		2021	member
Christoph Riner	SVP	Zeihen		2009	member
Claudia Rohrer	SP	Rheinfelden AG		2017	member
Andre Rotzetter	CVP	Buchs AG		2013	member
Bruno Rudolf	SVP	Reinach AG		2013	member
Edith Saner	CVP	Birmenstorf		2014	member
Werner Scherer	SVP	Killwangen		2017	member
Isabelle Schmid	Grüne	Tegerfelden		2021	member
Lea Schmidmeister	SP	Wettingen		2015	member
Bernhard Scholl	FDP	Möhlin		2014	member
Adrian Schoop	FDP	Turgi		2017	member
Uriel Seibert	EVP	Schöftland			member
Alice Sommer	Grüne	Zofingen		2021	member
Andy Steinacher	SVP	Schupfart		2020	member
Franziska Stenico-Goldschmid	CVP	Beinwil (Freiamt)		2019	member
Norbert Stichert	FDP	Untersiggenthal		2019	member
Walter Stierli	SVP	Fischbach-Göslikon			member
Gérald Strub	FDP	Boniswil		2017	member
Désirée Stutz	SVP	Möhlin		2017	member
Emanuel Suter	SVP	Gipf-Oberfrick		2021	member
Rahela Syed	SP	Zofingen		2017	member
Bruno Tüscher	FDP	Münchwilen		2020	member
Daniel Urech	SVP	Sins		2015	member
Brigitte Vogel	SVP	Lenzburg		2021	member
Roland Vogt	SVP	Wohlen		2015	member
Gian von Planta	glp	Baden AG		2019	member
Susanne Voser	CVP	Neuenhof AG		2017	member
Rolf Walser	SP	Aarburg		2020	member
Daniel Wehrli	SVP	Küttigen		2009	member
Martin Wernli	SVP	Thalheim AG		2011	member
Michael Wetzel	CVP	Ennetbaden		2017	member
Urs Winzenried	SVP	Aarau		2021	member

== Members resigned and replaced during the legislative period 2021–2024 ==
Name	Party	Day of resign	follower	place of residence	obligation
Dieter Egli	SP	"Regierungsrat"	Luzia Capanni	Windisch	January 1, 2021
Michaela Huser	SVP	June 22, 2021	Patrick Frei	Untersiggenthal	August 24, 2021
Roger Fessler	SVP	June 28, 2021	Adrian Gräub	Baden AG	September 14, 2021
Susanne Voser	Die Mitte	September 30, 2021	Markus Schneider	Baden AG	November 9, 2021
Alice Sommer	Grüne	January 11, 2021	Nicola Bossard	Kölliken	January 18, 2022
Martin Wernli	SVP	January 18, 2022	Miro Barp	Brugg	March 22, 2022
Christian Merz	SVP	March 22, 2022	Manuel Kaspar	Oberkulm	April 26, 2022

|}
