= Giezendanner =

Giezendanner is a surname. Notable people with the surname include:

- Babeli Giezendanner (1831–1905), Swiss painter
- Blaise Giezendanner (born 1991), French alpine skier
- Ingo Giezendanner (born 1975), Swiss painter
- Ulrich Giezendanner (born 1953), Swiss businessman and politician
- Benjamin Giezendanner (born 1982), Swiss businessman and politician
- Stefan Giezendanner (born 1978), Swiss businessman and politician
