= Walter Glur =

Swiss politician (born 1943)

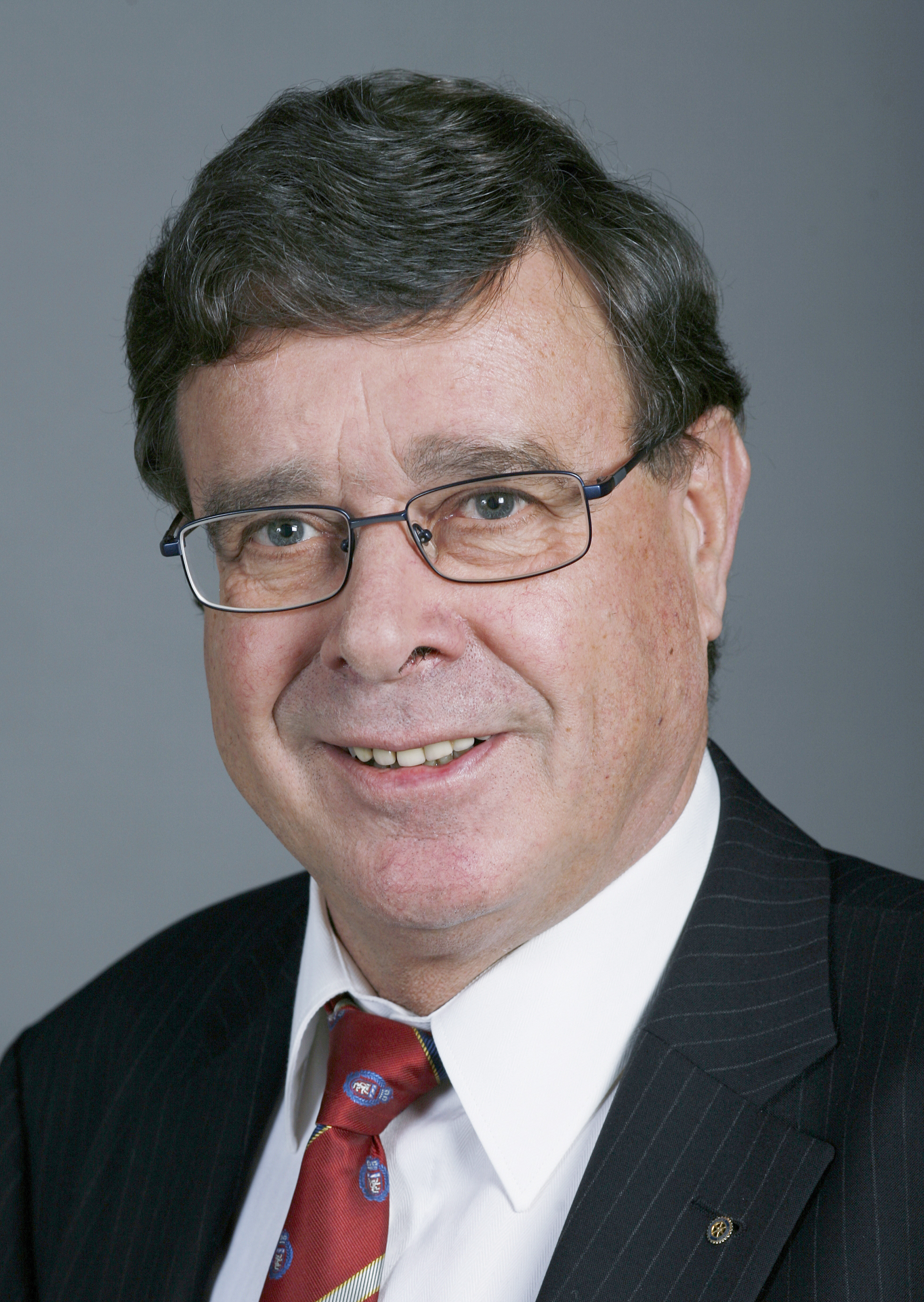
- Official portrait, 2011

Member of the National Council (Switzerland)
- In office 6 December 1999 – 4 December 2011
- Constituency: Canton of Aargau

Member of the Grand Council of Aargau
- In office 1981 – 1999

Personal details
- Born: Walter Glur; 11 April 1943 (age 83) Oftringen, Switzerland
- Party: Swiss People's Party
- Spouse: Annaliese König (m. 1970)
- Children: 3
- Occupation: Farmer, politician
- Website: Official website Parliament website

Military service
- Allegiance: Switzerland
- Branch/service: Swiss Armed Forces
- Rank: Gefreiter

Walter Glur (German pronunciation: [ˈvaltɐ ɡlʊɐ̯]; born 11 April 1943) is a Swiss farmer and politician who most notably served on the National Council (Switzerland) for the Swiss People's Party from 1999 to 2011.

He previously served on the Grand Council of Aargau from 1981 to 1999. He was a board member of several meat producer associations and a regional bank. He is the father of Christian Glur, who currently also serves on the National Council (Switzerland), succeeding Martina Bircher.

== Personal life ==
In 1970, Glur married Annalise König, a secondary school teacher and district judge. They had three children;

- Hans Ulrich Glur (died 1999), a farmer
- Maya Glur (born 1971), a psychologist and banking specialist, who is married to Marc Weber, and based in Zurich, Switzerland.
- Christian Glur (born 1975), farmer and politician who also serves on the National Council, married to Ramona Amport, two children.

Glur resides in Glashütten, Switzerland (presently a part of Murgenthal).
