= Benjamin Giezendanner =

Swiss businessman and politician

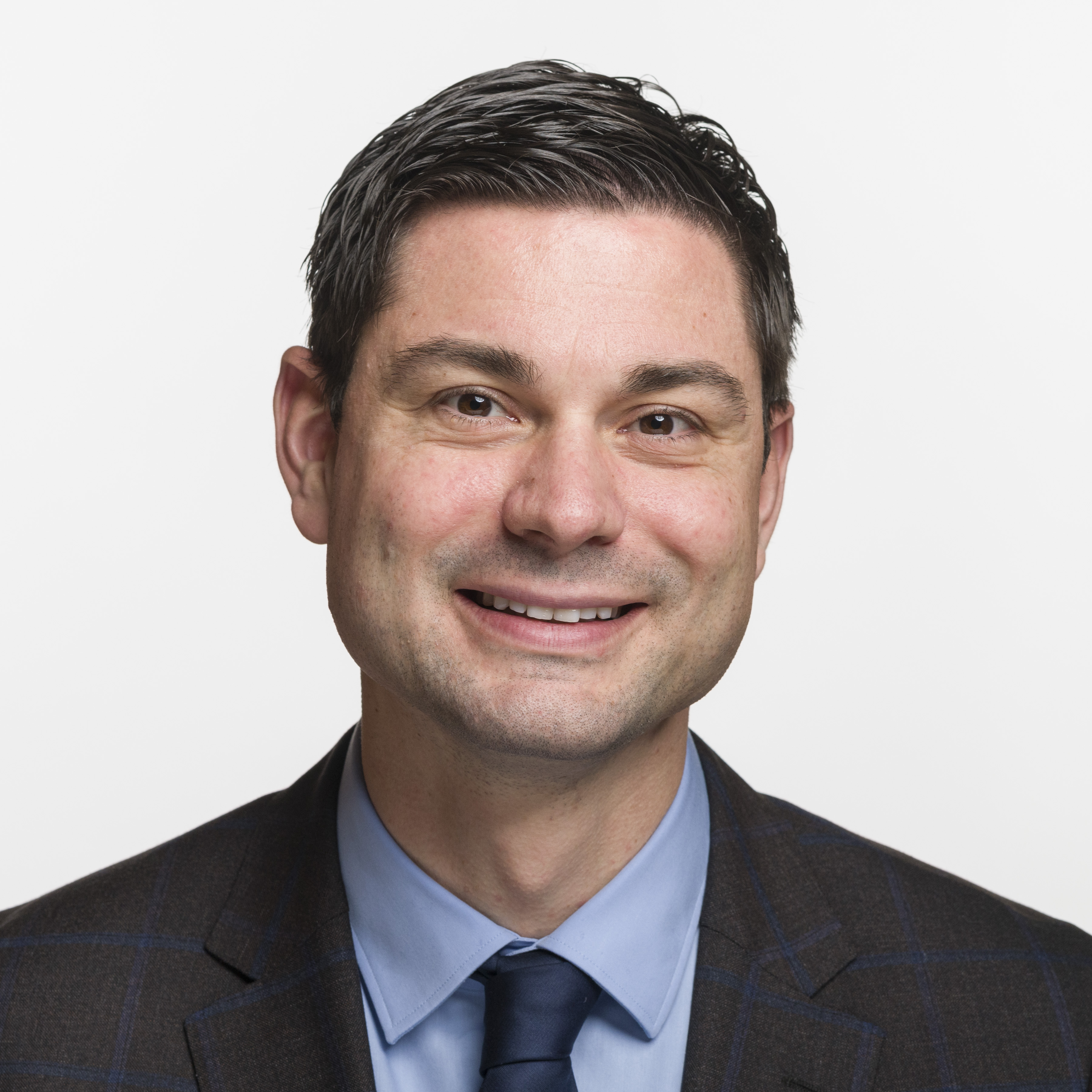
- Official portrait, 2019

Member of the National Council (Switzerland)
- Incumbent
- Assumed office 2 December 2019
- Constituency: Canton of Aargau

Member of the Grand Council of Aargau
- In office 8 May 2001 – 5 November 2019

Personal details
- Born: Benjamin Giezendanner; 22 April 1982 (age 44) Langenthal, Bern, Switzerland
- Party: Swiss People's Party
- Spouse: Jasmine Litschi (m. 2013)
- Relations: Stefan Giezendanner (brother)
- Children: 3
- Parent: Ulrich Giezendanner
- Education: University of St. Gallen (Licentiate I)
- Profession: Businessman, politician
- Website: Official website Parliament website

Military service
- Allegiance: Switzerland
- Branch/service: Swiss Armed Forces
- Years of service: 2001 - present
- Rank: Captain

Benjamin Giezendanner (German pronunciation: [bɛnjaˈmiːn ˈɡiːzəndaˌnɛr]; born 22 April 1982) is a Swiss businessman and politician who is a member of the National Council (Switzerland) for the Swiss People's Party (SVP) since 2019. He previously was on the Grand Council of Aargau being elected as the youngest member only aged 18 in 2001. In the 2023 Swiss federal election he was a candidate for Council of States (Switzerland), but lost election against Marianne Binder-Keller. Giezendanner is the youngest son of former National Councillor Ulrich Giezendanner (b. 1953) and brother of incumbent Grand Councillor Stefan Giezendanner (b. 1978).

== Early life and education ==
Giezendanner was born 22 April 1982 in Langenthal, Switzerland, the youngest of three children to Ulrich Giezendanner, businessman and former politician, and his first wife Helene Giezendanner (née Rüegger; d. 1997). His oldest brother, Oliver, died in early childhood.

His paternal family originally hailed from Wattwil, St. Gallen, Switzerland. His grandfather Johann Ulrich Giezendanner formed Giezendanner Group in 1934, which specializes in transportation and logistics. A maternal great-grandfather was among the founders of Stahlrohr A.-G. (which would later be integrated into Benteler International).

Giezendanner was raised in Rothrist, Switzerland, where he attended the local schools. He completed a banking apprenticeship at UBS in Aarau. After spending nine months in San Diego, California, he returned to Switzerland, where he studied Economics at the University of St. Gallen (Licentiate I). However, he did not graduate.

== Career ==
After several years in banking, he took-over management of the family business in 2008 alongside his elder brother Stefan. He has been a controlling shareholder of the group since 2017 after his father Ulrich Giezendanner officially retired but remained on the board of directors. In the same year it became public, that the brothers will not continue to work together, and Stefan will step back from management by the end of 2018, due to internal discrepancies.

Since 2018, Giezendanner has sbeen chief executive officer of the Giezendanner companies headquartered in Rothrist, Switzerland with foreign subsidiaries in Cologne, Germany and Busto-Arsizio, Italy. Handelszeitung estimated the annual turnover at CHF 60-70 million (US$65 million to 75 million in 2023). Additionally he is the president of the Argovian Commercial Fund Association (German: Aargauischer Gewerbefonds).

== Politics ==
In 2001, Giezendanner was elected to the Grand Council of Aargau. At the age of 18 he was the youngest elected councillor of all time. On 23 October 2016, he achieved the best result with 6049 votes in the elections for the Grand Council in the Zofingen District. In 2017, he was elected Speaker of Parliament with 134 out of 135 votes. In October 2019, Giezendanner ran in the elections to the National Council and was elected, subsequently he resigned from his position in the Grand Council which he held for over 16 years.

Giezendanner's political focus is on trade and economic policy, transport and security policy as well as family policy. He has been a board member of the Aargau Trade Association since 2016 and President since 2020. He has been a member of the board of trustees of the Aargau Foundation for Freedom and Responsibility in Politics and Business since 2015.

In 2022, Giezendanner made public, that he intends to campaign for a seat on the Council of States. During the 2023 Swiss federal election which was held on 23 October 2023, Giezendanner missed direct election and was ultimately selected for second ballot elections which was held in November. He ultimately lost the election against Marianne Binder-Keller, who was elected with 84,431 votes, missing roughly 5,000 votes.

== Personal life ==
He is married to Jasmine (née Litschi) Giezendanner, who also grew-up in Rothrist, and has three daughters. They reside in Rothrist, Switzerland.

In the Swiss Armed Forces he holds the rank as captain.
