= Christoph Riner =

Swiss politician (born 1977)

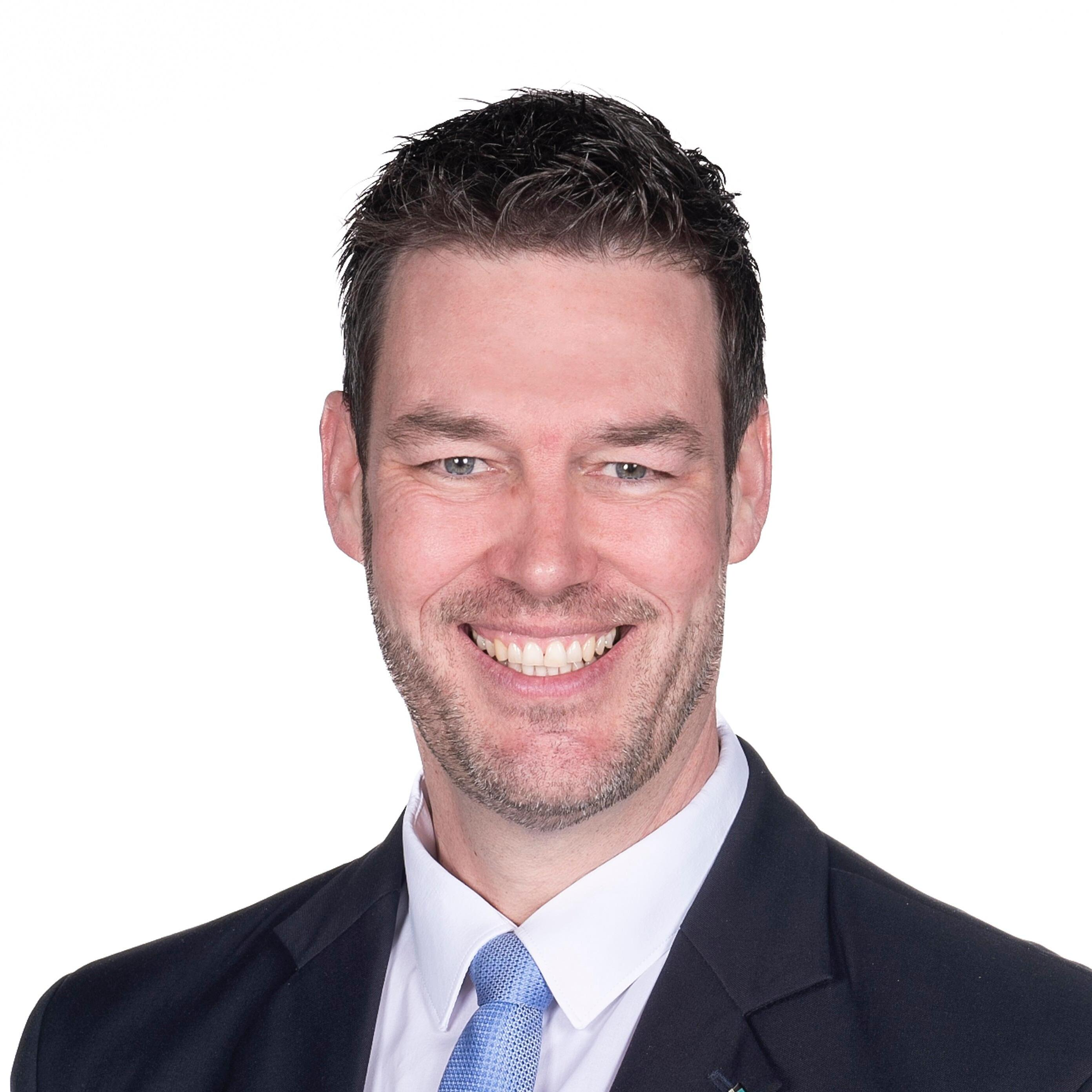

Member of the National Council (Switzerland)
- Incumbent
- Assumed office 4 December 2023
- Constituency: Aargau

Personal details
- Born: Christoph Riner; 12 June 1977 (age 48)
- Party: Swiss People's Party
- Website: Official website Parliament website

Christoph Riner (German pronunciation: [ˈkʁɪstɔf ˈʁiːnɐ]; born 12 June 1977) is a Swiss politician who currently serves on the National Council (Switzerland) for the Swiss People's Party since 2023. He served on the Grand Council of Aargau for the Laufenburg District since 2009.
