= Yvonne Bürgin =

Swiss politician (born 1970)

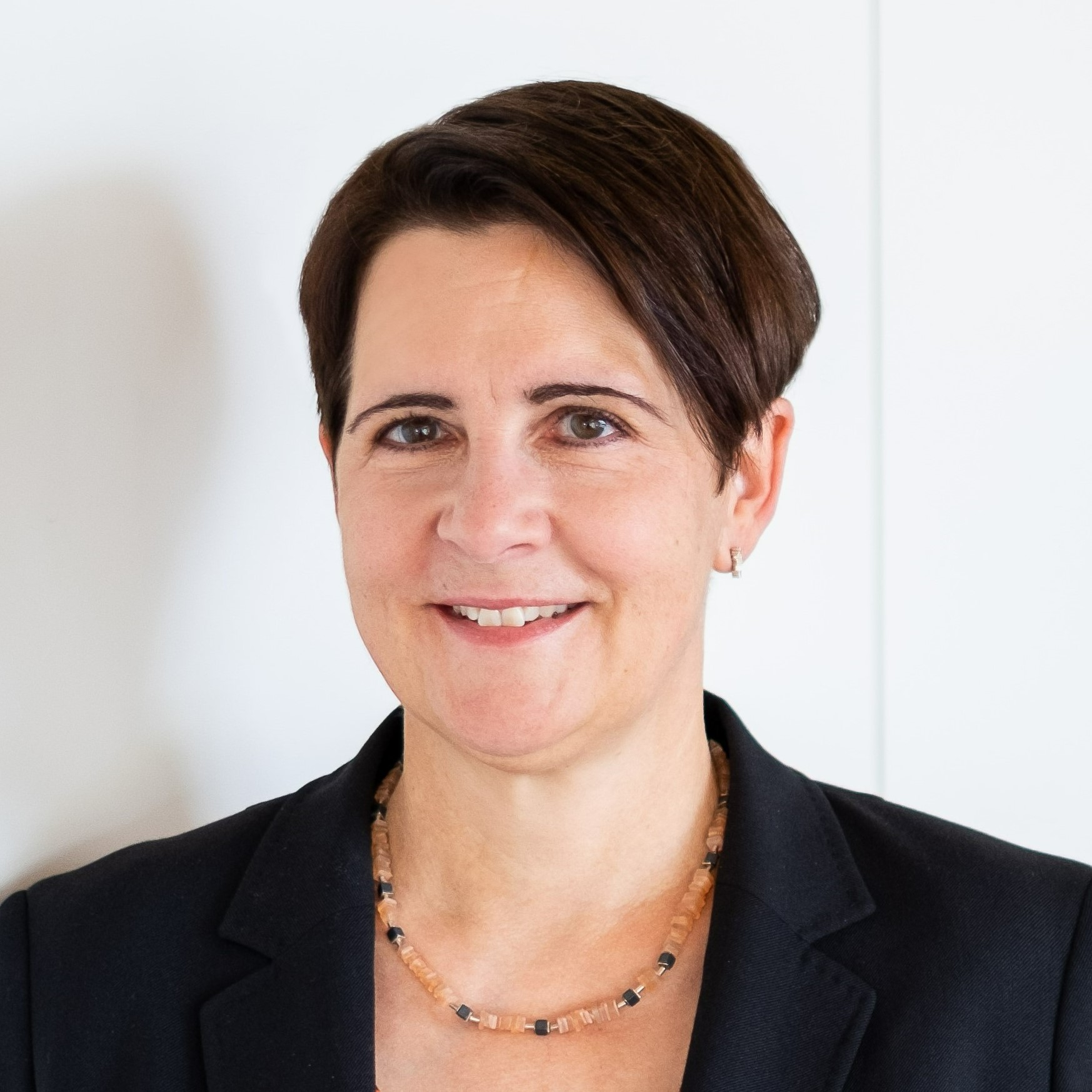
- Yvonne Bürgin in 2023

Member of the National Council of Switzerland
- Incumbent
- Assumed office 4 December 2023

Personal details
- Born: 27 August 1970 (age 56) Rüti, Zürich
- Party: The Centre
- Other political affiliations: CVP (formerly)

Yvonne Bürgin (born 27 August 1970 in Rüti; citizen of Wetzikon and Bubendorf) is a Swiss politician (The Centre, formerly CVP).

== Education, career and personal life ==
Bürgin attended primary and secondary school in Rüti (Zurich Oberland). After an apprenticeship as a tailor with vocational school and subsequent further training at the STF Schweizerische Textilfachschule Zürich, she worked as a textile designer of curtain and decorative fabrics. She first worked at the Weisbrod-Zürrer silk weaving mill, and later at the Keller AG weaving mill in Wald.

Bürgin is the mother of three adult children and, in addition to her political mandate, works in the family's natural stone business, where she is responsible for administration and accounting.

== Political career ==
Bürgin has been a member of the Christian Democratic People's Party (CVP) since 1998 and of The Centre Party since 2021. She served as vice president and later as co-president of her local party branch. From 2006 to 2014, Bürgin was a member of the school board of the Rüti secondary school, where her responsibilities included supporting students with special needs. In 2013, Bürgin was elected to the Cantonal Council of Zurich and joined its executive committee in 2016. On 7 May 2018, she was elected President of the Cantonal Council for the 2018/19 term. Following the 2019 elections of the Cantonal Council, she led The Centre Party parliamentary group as its president until the end of 2023. Since June 2021, she has been vice president of The Centre Party Switzerland. Bürgin has served as mayor of Rüti since 1 July 2022.

She was elected to the National Council in the elections of 22 October 2023, where she is a member of the Finance Committee. On 16 September 2025, she was elected President of the Centre Party in the Federal Assembly, succeeding National Councillor Philipp Matthias Bregy. Her only opponent was National Councillor Maya Bally.

== See also ==
- List of members of the National Council of Switzerland (2023–2027)
