= Ulrich Giezendanner =

Swiss businessman and former politician

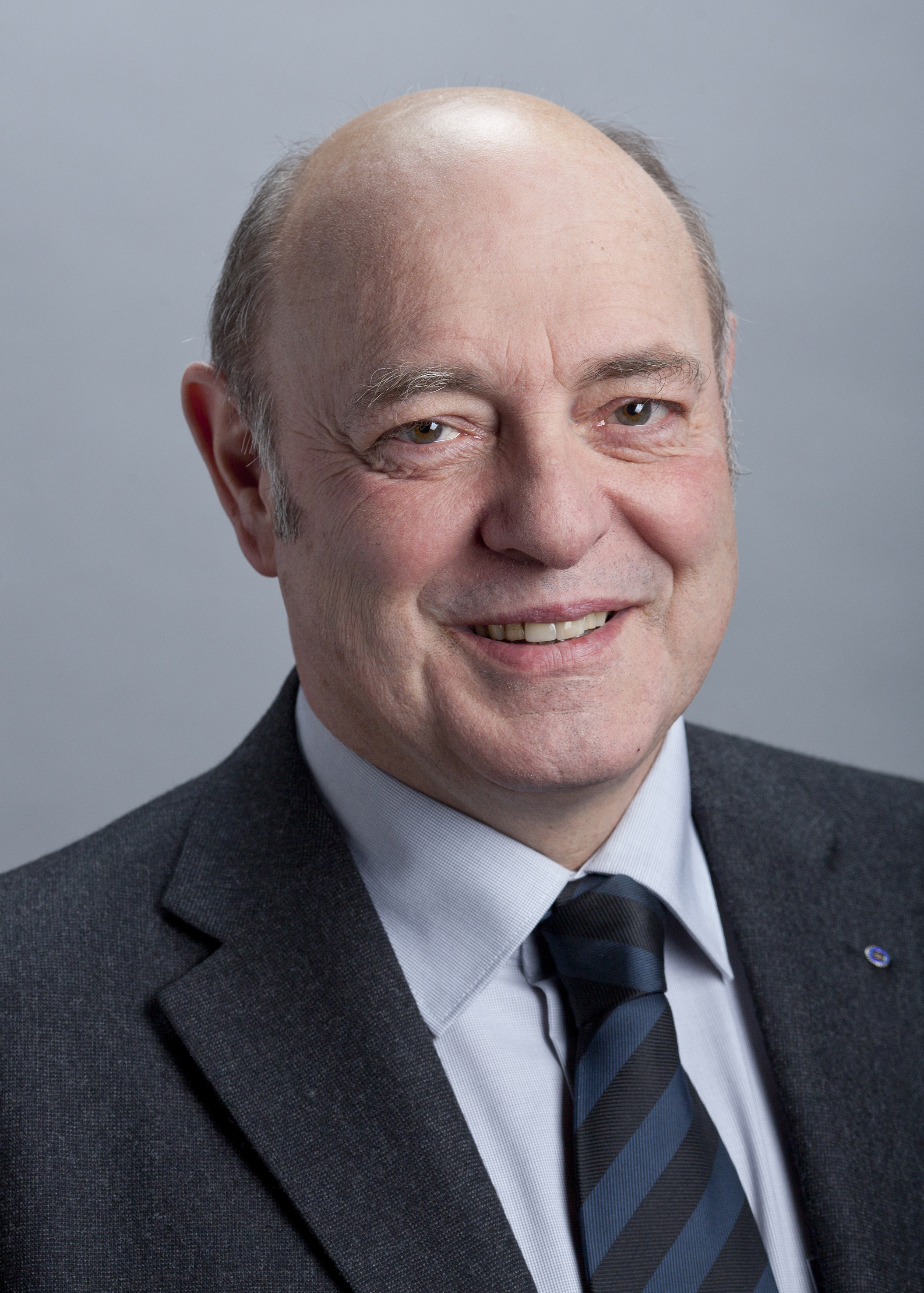
- Official portrait, 2011

Member of National Council
- In office 11 November 1991 – 1 December 2019
- Constituency: Canton of Aargau

Member of Grand Council of Aargau
- In office 1 March 1989 – 31 October 1991

Personal details
- Born: Ulrich Giezendanner; 31 October 1953 (age 72) Rothrist, Aargau, Switzerland
- Party: Swiss People's Party
- Spouses: Helene Rüegger (m. 1975; died 1997) Roberta Baumann (m. 2017)
- Children: 4, including Benjamin and Stefan
- Occupation: Businessman, politician

Military service
- Allegiance: Switzerland
- Branch/service: Swiss Armed Forces
- Rank: Soldier

Ulrich "Ueli" Giezendanner (Swiss Standard German: [ˈʊlrɪç ˈɡiːəzn̩ˌdanər]; born 31 October 1953) is a Swiss businessman and former politician who served as a member of the National Council for the Swiss People's Party from 1991 to 2019. He previously also served on the Grand Council of Aargau from 1989 to 1991. He remains a controlling shareholder in Giezendanner Group and serves as deputy chairman of KPT Health Insurance in Bern, Switzerland.

== Early life and education ==
Giezendanner was born 31 October 1953 in Rothrist, Switzerland, one of two children, to Johann Ulrich Giezendanner, a small business owner, and Eva Giezendanner (née Zimmerli), into a Protestant family.

His father originally hailed from Wattwil in the Toggenburg region of St. Gallen but came to Rothrist where he married a local woman from nearby Aarburg. Together they launched a small business which primarily operated as coal and wood wholesale but also offered ground transportation. This business was ultimately transformed into the multinational transportation company Giezendanner.

Besides a commercial apprenticeship never completed a formal tertiary education and considers himself a practitioner. In 1972, aged 19, he entered the family business after the sudden death of his father.

== Career ==
After joining the family business in the early 1970s, Giezendanner transformed the limited partnership — until then a small operation whose stated purpose covered "trade in coal, wood, agricultural products, fertilizers, beverages, fruits and vegetables, automotive transport, and taxi operations", into a company specializing in transportation and logistics.

In 1976, Giezendanner turned the business into a stock corporation, Giezendanner Transport AG, which started out with four trucks and two trailers. He partnered with Hupac and pioneered in intermodal transportation. In 2000, Giezendanner sold 90% of his shares in the company to Lagerhäuser Aarau AG, but bought it back in 2010. Giezendanner currently has an annual revenue of approximately 70 million Swiss Francs.

Presently, Giezendanner is managed by Benjamin Giezendanner, who assumed the role of CEO in 2014. His brother, Stefan Giezendanner, was dismissed from management due to internal discrepancies in 2017. Both remain majority shareholders of the group.

Giezendanner has become deputy chairman of KPT Health Insurance, where is also a member on the Nomination and Compensation Committee. He remains a board member of the board of all Giezendanner companies.

== Politics ==
From March 1989 to November 1991, he served in the Canton of Aargau legislature. In 1991, he was elected to the National Council, representing the canton of Aargau, and since 1995 he has been the head of the Commission for Transport and Telecommunications. Until mid-1996, he was a member of the Freedom Party of Switzerland. Since then, Giezendanner has been a member of the Swiss People's Party.

Giezendanner supported the expansion of the Baregg tunnel (a bit of a bottleneck in the Swiss motorway network) in 2003, and the adding of a second tube of the Gotthard road tunnel. He currently is an advocate of the creation of a Formula 1 circuit course in Switzerland. The federal government's policy of shifting the heavy transit traffic to rail, has been the cause of criticism of Giezendanner, because of his work on the Baregg tunnel and on the Gotthard road tunnel.

He's a member of a Campaign for an Independent and Neutral Switzerland.

== Private ==
In 1975, Giezendanner married firstly to Helene Rüegger (died 1997), with whom he had four children.

- Oliver Giezendanner (died in infancy).
- Christine Giezendanner, married to Roger Spichiger, with issue.
- Stefan Giezendanner (born 1978), who serves on the Grand Council of Aargau since 2020, married without issue.
- Benjamin Giezendanner (born 1982) was the youngest elected member of the Grand Council of Aargau and current member of the National Council, and most recently prospective candidate for Council of States (Switzerland), married to Jasmine Litschi, with issue.

In 2017, he married secondly to Roberta Baumann (born 1965), in Zofingen. He splits his time between Rothrist and Vira (Gambarogno) in Ticino.
