= Robert Obrist =

Swiss politician (1958–2025)

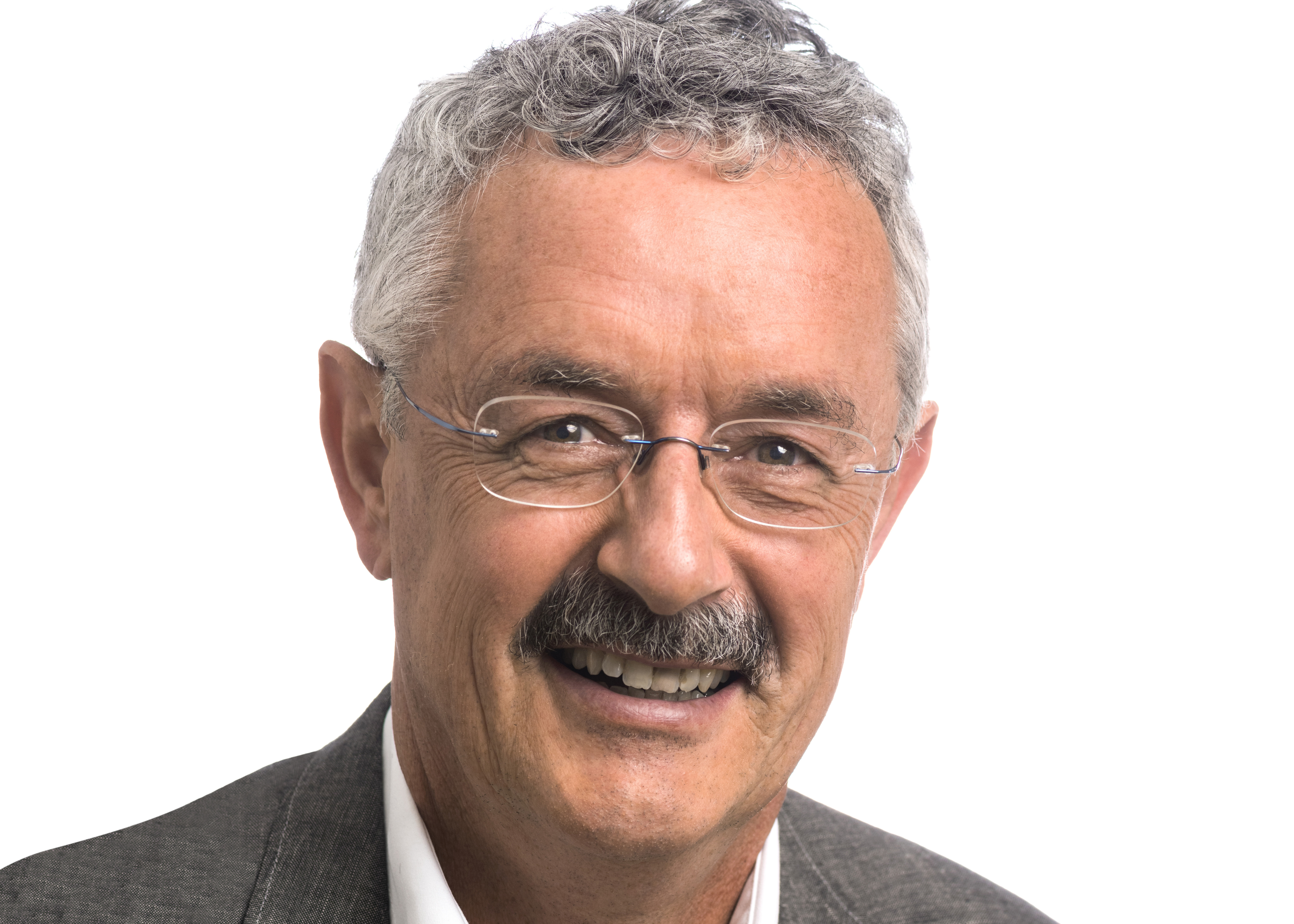
- Obrist in 2016

Member of the Grand Council of Aargau
- In office 7 January 2014 – 31 December 2024

Personal details
- Born: 27 February 1958
- Died: 11 February 2025 (aged 66)
- Party: Green
- Education: ETH Zurich
- Occupation: Agronomist

Robert Obrist (27 February 1958 – 11 February 2025) was a Swiss politician. A member of the Green Party, he served in the Grand Council of Aargau from 2014 to 2024.

Obrist died on 11 February 2025, at the age of 66.
