= Constituencies of Switzerland =

Overview of Switzerland's constituencies

There are 26 constituencies in Switzerland – one for each of the 26 cantons of Switzerland – for the election of the National Council and the Council of States.

The National Council consists of 200 members. National Council seats are apportioned to the cantons based on their respective population size (which includes children and resident foreigners who do not have the right to vote). As of the 2019 federal election, there are twenty multi-member constituencies with Zürich having the greatest number of National Council seats at 35. There are six constituencies that only have one National council seat: Appenzell Ausserrhoden, Appenzell Innerrhoden, Glarus, Nidwalden, Obwalden and Uri. Multi-member constituencies elect their National Council members by open list proportional representation, while single-seat constituencies elect theirs also by proportional representation but de-facto by first-past-the-post voting.

The Council of States consists of 46 members. There are 20 two-seat constituencies representing 20 "full" cantons and six one-seat constituencies representing six "half" cantons. In 24 constituencies, Council of States members are elected using a majority system. Proportional representation is used to elect Council of States members in Jura and Neuchâtel.

== List of constituencies ==

Constituency	Electorate (2019)	Population	Seats	
Constituency	Electorate (2019)	Population	National Council	Council of States
Aargau	429,516	694,072	16	2
Appenzell Ausserrhoden	39,063	55,309	1	1
Appenzell Innerrhoden	11,942	16,293	1	1
Basel-Landschaft	190,095	292,955	7	1
Basel-Stadt	114,139	201,156	5	1
Bern	740,307	1,043,132	24	2
Fribourg	206,025	325,496	7	2
Geneva	267,337	506,343	12	2
Glarus	26,520	40,851	1	2
Grisons	139,759	200,096	5	2
Jura	53,522	73,709	2	2
Lucerne	279,236	416,347	9	2
Neuchâtel	112,704	175,894	4	2
Nidwalden	31,367	43,520	1	1
Obwalden	27,089	38,108	1	1
Schaffhausen	52,377	83,107	2	2
Schwyz	105,606	162,157	4	2
Solothurn	180,743	277,462	6	2
St. Gallen	324,636	514,504	12	2
Thurgau	174,337	282,909	6	2
Ticino	223,271	350,986	8	2
Uri	26,781	36,819	1	2
Valais	226,331	348,503	8	2
Vaud	453,280	814,762	19	2
Zug	77,470	128,794	3	2
Zürich	944,765	1,553,423	35	2
Source: Psephos, Swiss Government

== Defunct constituencies ==
From 1848 until 1919, members of the National Council was voted using a majority system. The number of members of the National Council changed after a number of years on the results of a census. During this period, a National Council member represented 20,000 people.

Constituencies during these period were of various sizes. Smaller cantons were usually represented in one constituency while larger cantons were divided into several constituencies. There were single-member constituencies, as well as multi-member constituencies with the largest being the constituencies of Aargau from 1848 until 1851 and Zürich-Southwest from 1902 until 1911 which both had nine seats. These constituencies were officially referred to by an assigned number, but was also unofficially referred to by their names that were based on the name of the canton or a geographical area within a canton.

From 1848 to 1851, constituencies were designated by the cantonal governments. A federal election law designated the constituencies starting from 1851 until the introduction of the proportional representation system in 1919.

=== List of constituencies prior to 1919 ===
Years	Seats	Constituencies
1848–1851	111	48
1851–1863	120	49
1863–1872	128	47
1872–1881	135	48
1881–1890	145	49
1890–1902	147	52
1902–1911	167	49
1911–1919	189	49

=== List of defunct constituencies ===
The listed constituencies are referred to by their unofficial names. They are officially referred to by a designated number which changes after a number of years.

- Aargau-Central
- Aargau-North
- Aargau-Southeast
- Aargau-Southwest
- Bern-Emmental
- Bern-Jura
- Bern-Mittelland
- Bern-North Jura
- Bern-Oberaargau
- Bern-Oberland
- Bern-Seeland
- Bern-South Jura
- Central Valais
- Fribourg-Central
- Fribourg-North
- Fribourg-South
- Grisons-Central
- Grisons-East
- Grisons-North
- Grisons-West
- Lower Valais
- Lucerne-Central
- Lucerne-East
- Lucerne-North
- Lucerne-Northeast
- Lucerne-Northwest
- Lucerne-South
- Lucerne-Southwest
- Lucerne-West
- Schwyz-North
- Schwyz-South
- St. Gallen-Central
- St. Gallen-Northwest
- St. Gallen-Northeast
- St. Gallen-South
- St. Gallen-Stadt
- St. Gallen-West
- Thurgau 1
- Thurgau 2
- Thurgau 3
- Thurgau 4
- Ticino-North
- Ticino-South
- Upper Valais
- Upper Valais-North
- Upper Valais-South
- Vaud-East
- Vaud-North
- Vaud-West
- Zürich-East
- Zürich-North
- Zürich-South
- Zürich-Southwest
- Zürich-West
