= Daniel Hölzle =

Swiss politician and school superintendent

Member of the Grand Council of Aargau
- Incumbent
- Assumed office 30 March 2013

Personal details
- Born: Daniel Andreas Hölzle; 22 August 1981 (age 45)
- Party: The Greens
- Children: 2
- Education: University of Fribourg (MS)
- Occupation: Chemist, educator, politician

Daniel Andreas Hölzle (Swiss Standard German pronunciation: [ˈd̥ɑːni̯əl ˈhœu̯t͡sli]; born 22 August 1981) is a Swiss chemist, educator and politician who currently serves on the Grand Council of Aargau for the The Greens since 2013. He concurrently served as president of the Green Party of Aargau until 2025.

== Early life and education ==
Hölzle was born 22 August 1981 to Rolf Hölzle, an electrical engineer, and Irene Hölzle (née Keller). His paternal family is originally from Liestal, Basel-Landschaft. He completed a Master of Science in Chemistry at the University of Fribourg.

== Career ==
Initially, he worked as a chemical technician for a while before he formally began to teach. His first position was at his former secondary school in Brittnau where he primarily taught physics and chemistry. He sometimes was a substitute teacher for English. Hölzle currently serves in the position of superintendent and rector of the secondary schools in Brittnau and Zofingen.

== Politics ==
Hölzle was elected into Grand Council of Aargau for the Green Party of Switzerland and assumed office on 30 March 2013. Between 2013 and 2018 he was a member of the public safety commission and since 2018 he serves as a member of the audit committee. Since 2021 he additionally is a member of the commission of national economy and taxation. In 2022, Hölzle became a member of the Intercantonal Legislative Conference.

Between 2017 and 2020 he served on the city council of Zofingen.

== Personal life ==
Hölzle is married and has two children. He resides in Zofingen.
