= Daniel Notter =

Swiss politician

Daniel Notter (born 1972) is a Swiss politician (SVP). He is a member of the Grand Council of the Canton of Aargau.

== Politics ==
Since May 14, 2019 Notter is a member of the legislative of the canton of Aargau, the Grand Council. He is also a member of the parliament of his home town Wettingen.
