= Maya Bally =

Swiss politician

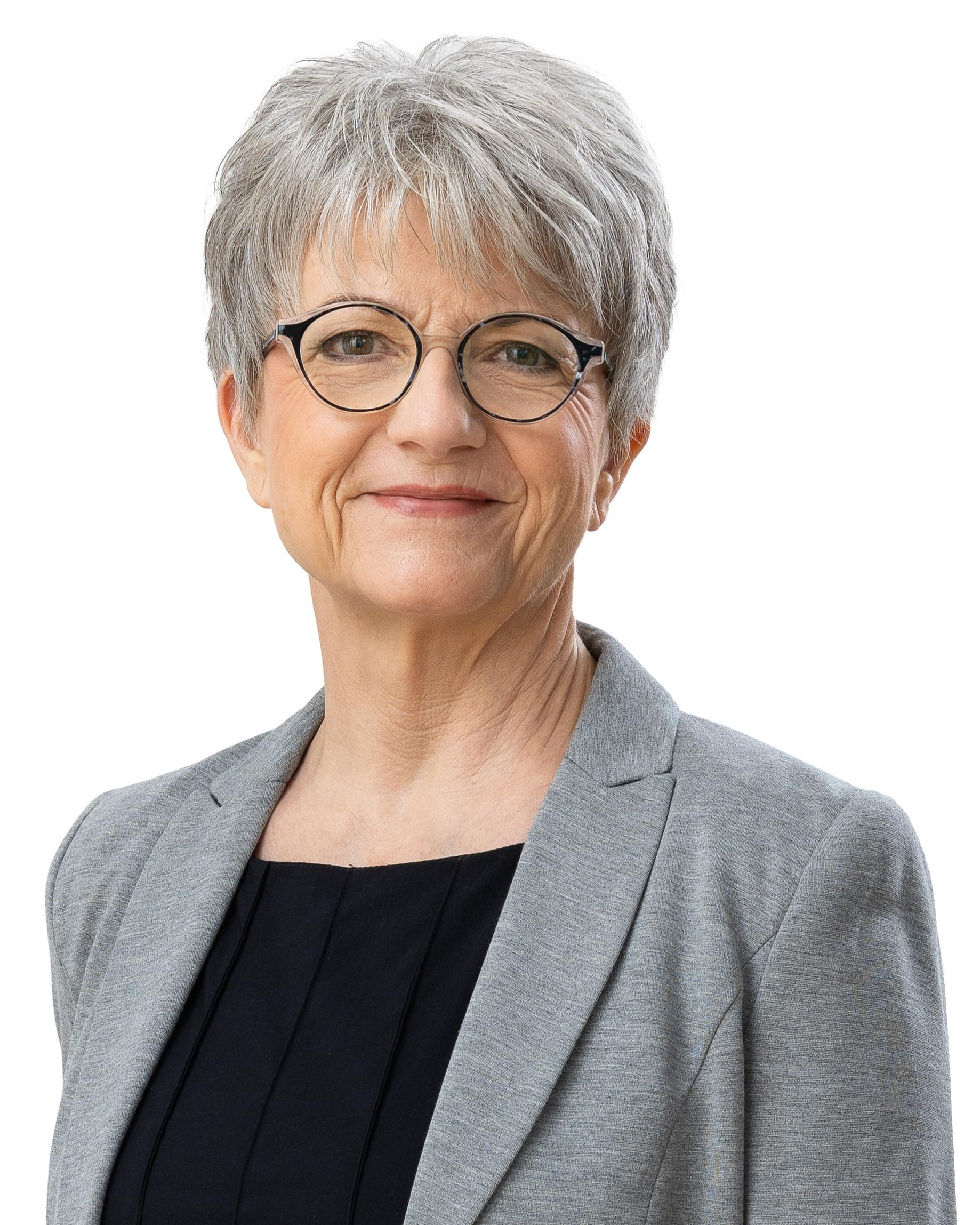
- Official portrait, 2023

Member of the National Council (Switzerland)
- Incumbent
- Assumed office 4 December 2023
- Preceded by: Marianne Binder-Keller
- Constituency: Canton of Aargau

Member of the Grand Council of Aargau
- Incumbent
- Assumed office 31 April 2013

Personal details
- Born: Maya Ines Bally; 16 June 1961 (age 65) Zürich, Switzerland
- Party: The Centre (since 2020)
- Other party: Conservative Democratic (until 2020)
- Spouse: Roland Frehner
- Children: 1
- Occupation: Politician, project manager
- Website: Official website Parliament website

Maya Ines Bally Frehner (German pronunciation: [ˈmaɪa ˈbali]; née Bally; 16 July 1961) is a Swiss politician who currently serves on the National Council (Switzerland) for The Centre succeeding Marianne Binder-Keller during the 2023 Swiss federal election who was ultimately elected into Council of States (Switzerland). Since 2013, she concurrently serves on the Grand Council of Aargau.

== Early life and education ==
Bally was born 16 July 1961 in Zurich, Switzerland, to Roland Bally. She is not related to the Bally fashion house. Her family has paternal roots in Boussens in the Canton of Vaud. She had one sister, Irène (1962–2011), and a brother, Daniel Bally. She was raised in Dietikon and after completing her Maturity studied Business administration at a commercial school in Zurich.

== Professional career ==
Initially, Bally worked at Xerox Corporation in Zurich, right after completing her Matura, in the sales department. From 1985 to 1997, she worked at SKA (now Credit Suisse) in various leadership roles, primarily as a business organizer. Between 1997 and 2005, Bally contributed to global consulting firm Computer Sciences Corporation, managing international projects in reinsurance and overseeing departments with 60-180 employees. Since 2005, she has been involved part-time in Frehner Informatik GmbH, an IT company led by her husband, in administrative roles and take on independent project management mandates.

== Politics ==
Bally has been elected into National Council (Switzerland) to succeed Marianne Binder-Keller during the 2023 Swiss federal election as a replacement since the latter was elected into Council of States (Switzerland). She concurrently also serves as a member of the Grand Council of Aargau.

== Personal life ==
Bally is married to Roland Frehner, who is an IT professional. They have a son, David Frehner. Both live in Hendschiken.
