= Marianne Binder-Keller =

Swiss politician (born 1958)

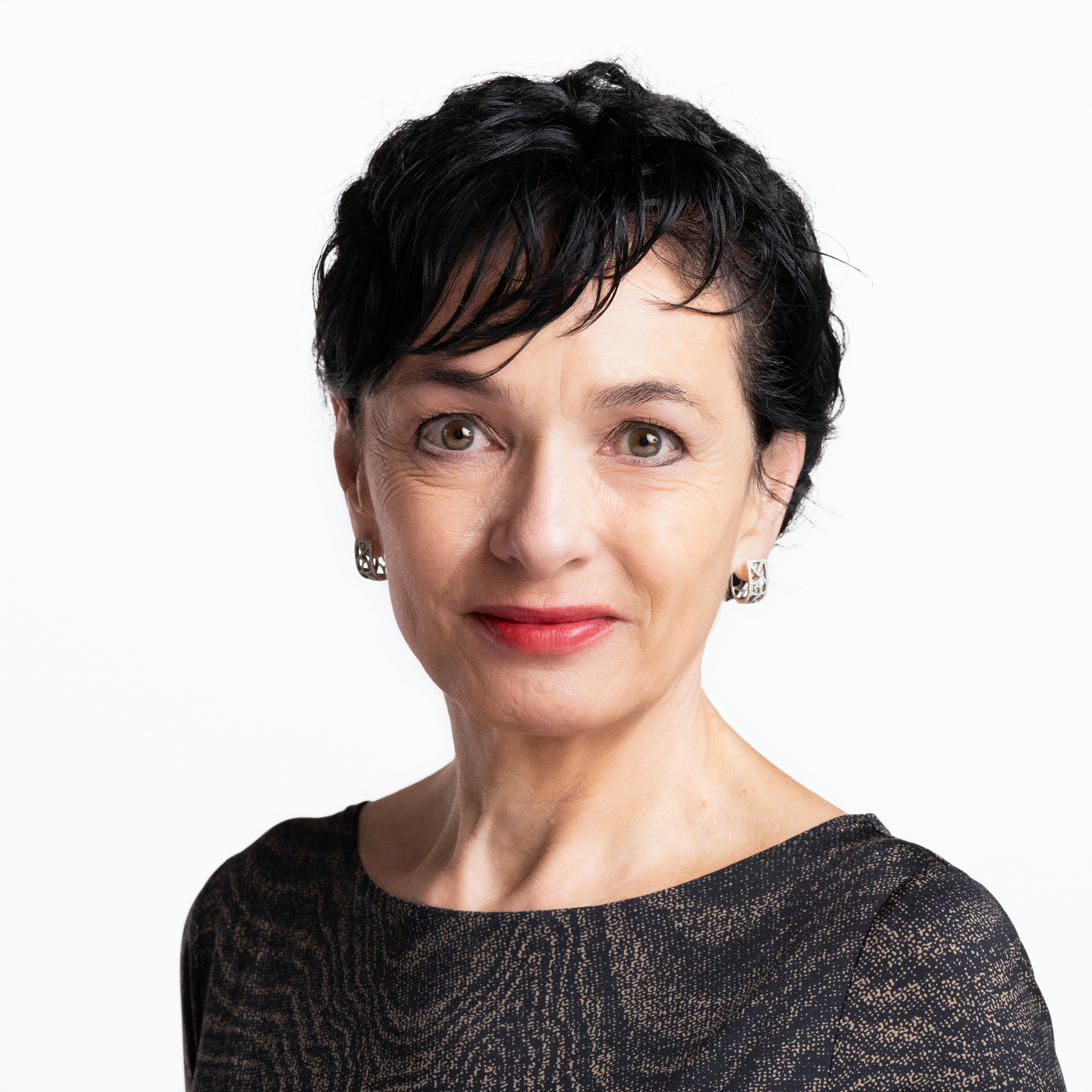
- Official portrait, 2021

Member of the National Council
- Incumbent
- Assumed office 2 December 2019
- Constituency: Canton of Aargau

Member of the Grand Council of Aargau
- In office 2013–2019

Personal details
- Born: Marianne Keller; 15 June 1958 (age 67) Baden, Switzerland
- Party: The Centre
- Other political affiliations: CVP (formerly)
- Spouse: Andreas Binder (m. 1982)
- Children: 3
- Parent: Anton Keller (father)
- Website: Official website Parliament website

Marianne Binder-Keller (née Keller; born 15 June 1958) is a Swiss communications professional and politician who currently serves as member of the National Council for The Centre (formerly CVP) since 2019. Binder-Keller currently is a member-elect of the Council of States (Switzerland) after being elected during the second ballot in the 2023 Swiss federal election which was held on 19 November 2023. She defeated Benjamin Giezendanner by roughly 5,000 votes.

== Early life and education ==
Binder was born Marianne Keller on 15 June 1958 in Baden, Switzerland to Anton Keller, a teacher who also served on the National Council, and writer and author Rosemarie Keller (née Borner). She has three brothers.

== Career ==
Binder-Keller is a communications professional. She was head of communications of CVP Switzerland and has been president of CVP in Baden District since 2015. She became president of CVP for the Canton Aargau in 2016. She was elected to the Grand Council of Aargau in 2013 and served on the council until 2019, when she was elected to the National Council. Her legislative interest focuses on economic framework, ethical issues and job security.

During the 2023 Swiss federal election, Binder-Keller defeated Benjamin Giezendanner, during the second ballot for Council of States (Switzerland) ultimately receiving roughly 5,000 votes more than her counterpart. Her victory was confirmed with 84,481 votes.

== Personal life ==
Since 1982, she is married to Andreas Keller. Her son is president of The Centre in Baden, Aargau.
