= Alain Burger =

Swiss politician

Alain Burger (born 1983) is a Swiss politician (SP). He is a member of the Grand Council of the Canton of Aargau.

== Politics ==
Since August 27, 2019 Burger is a member of the legislative of the canton of Aargau, the Grand Council. He is also a member of the parliament of his home town Wettingen.
