= Anton Keller =

Swiss politician (1934–2025)

Anton Keller PhD
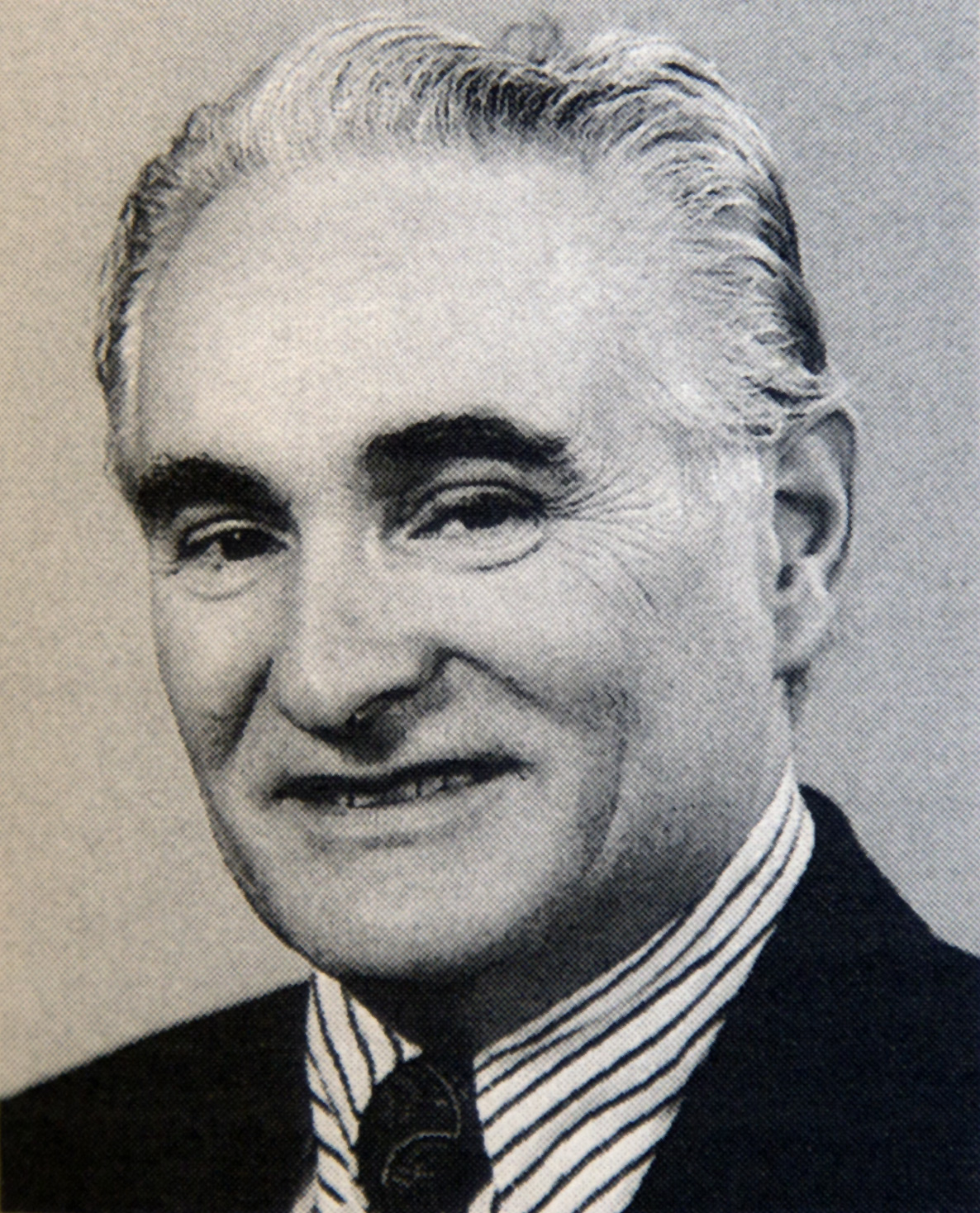
- Official portrait, 1979

Member of the National Council (Switzerland)
- In office 26 November 1979 – 3 December 1995
- Constituency: Canton of Aargau

Personal details
- Born: Anton Keller; 21 November 1934; Baden, Switzerland
- Died: 15 April 2025 (aged 90)
- Spouse: Rosemarie Borner
- Children: 4, including Marianne
- Occupation: Professor, politician

Anton Keller (21 November 1934 – 15 April 2025) was a Swiss politician who served on the National Council (Switzerland) from 1979 to 1995 for the Christian Democratic People's Party representing the Aargau constituency. He previously served as a member of the cantonal constitutional council and as president of the CVP section. Due to the family activities in politics they were titled The CVP-Kennedys from Baden by local news outlets. His daughter is incumbent National Councillor Marianne Binder-Keller. Keller died on 15 April 2025, at the age of 90.
