= Simona Brizzi =

Swiss politician (born 1973)

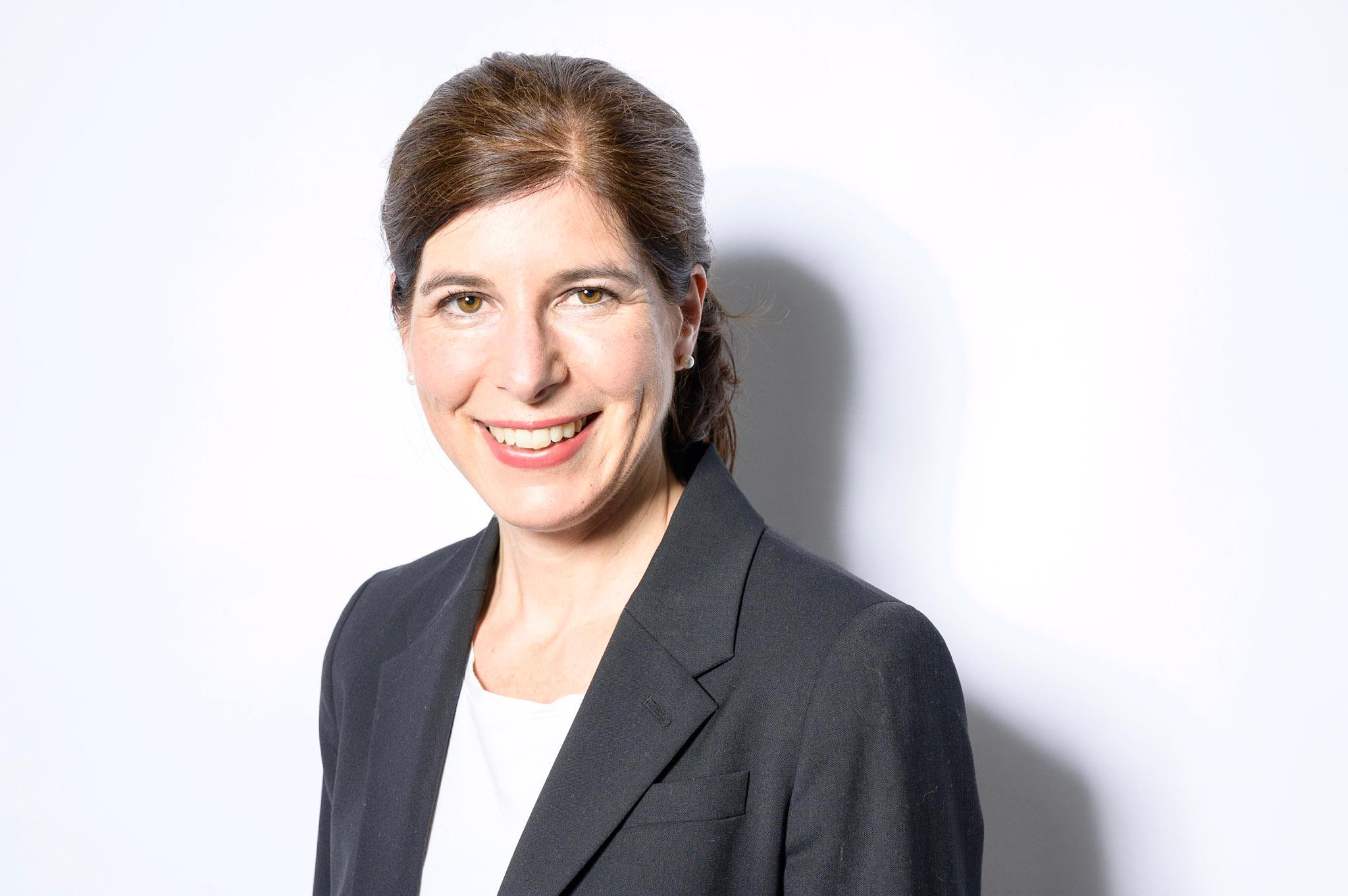
- 2023

Member of National Council (Switzerland)
- Incumbent
- Assumed office 4 December 2023

Personal details
- Born: Simona Brizzi; 16 November 1973 (age 52) Baden
- Citizenship: Switzerland; Italy
- Party: Social Democratic Party of Switzerland
- Children: 3
- Education: University of Zurich (Pädagogische Psychologie und Sozialpädagogik)
- Website: Official website Parliament website

Simona Brizzi (born 16 November 1973) is a Swiss politician, and member of Social Democratic Party of Switzerland. She was elected to the National Council in the 2023 federal elections in the canton of Aargau.

== Education and career ==
Brizzi is a lecturer and consultant. After obtaining her teaching certificate for primary and secondary schools, she began a master's degree (Educational Psychology and Social Education, Special Education and Psychopathology) at the University of Zurich. She worked as a secondary school teacher in the canton of Aargau until 2002. From 2002 to 2018, Brizzi taught at the University of Special Education in pedagogy for school difficulties. In addition to her political work, she works as a lecturer at the Zurich University of Teacher Education in the field of education and as an independent consultant.

== Politics ==
Brizzi is a member of Social Democratic Party of Switzerland. She says she was interested in politics from an early age; she often accompanied her mother, who was active as a city councilor. In 2001, she was elected to the Grand Council for the first time but resigned in 2007 for family and professional reasons. In 2009, Brizzi was elected to the Education Council of the Canton of Aargau (until 2018). In 2017, she was re-elected to the Grand Council. In the parliamentary elections in October 2023, she won one of three National Council seats for the SP of the canton of Aargau with 28,814 votes. She is a member of the Commission for Science, Education and Culture.

== Personal life ==
Brizzi grew up in Rütihof. She lives with her family in Ennetbaden in the canton of Aargau. She is married and has three children.

== See also ==
- List of members of the National Council of Switzerland (2023–2027)
- List of members of the Federal Assembly from the Canton of Aargau
- List of members of the Grand Council of Aargau (2021–2024)
