= Alt Homberg Castle =

Castle ruin in Wittnau, Switzerland

- Ruine Alt Homberg
- Wittnau, Aargau in Switzerland

Site information
- Type: Ruined castle
- Condition: Portions visible

Location
- Coordinates: 47.491056°N 7.972999°E

Site history
- Built: around 1100

Alt Homberg Castle is a ruined castle in the municipality of Wittnau in the canton of Aargau in Switzerland. The castle is classified as a Swiss heritage site of national significance.

== History ==
Alt Homberg was built around 1100 for the Counts of Homberg on a triangular hilltop north of the village of Wittnau. The first recorded Count of Homberg, Rudolf, appears in a record in 1082 when he married Ita von Habsburg. In 1225 the Homberg line died out and the castle was inherited by the Counts of Frohburg. Over the following years a cadet line of the Frohburg family took the name Neu-Homberg and established a new castle Neu-Homburg near Läufelfingen. In 1323 the last Count of Neu-Homberg, Werner III, died and the castle was inherited by Countess Maria von Oettingen. She sold it on 8 August 1351 to Duke Albrecht of Austria for 400 Marks. On 18 October 1356 the castle was destroyed in the Basel earthquake. After the earthquake the chapel and portions of the castle were quickly rebuilt, but by 1486 it was recorded as the barren castle of Weitnauw. The castle was excavated in 1882-84. Many of the artifacts, dating from the 11th to 15th centuries, are on display in the Historical Museum of Lenzburg Castle.

== See also ==
- List of castles and fortresses in Switzerland
