= Andreas Meier =

Swiss businessman and politician (born 1962)

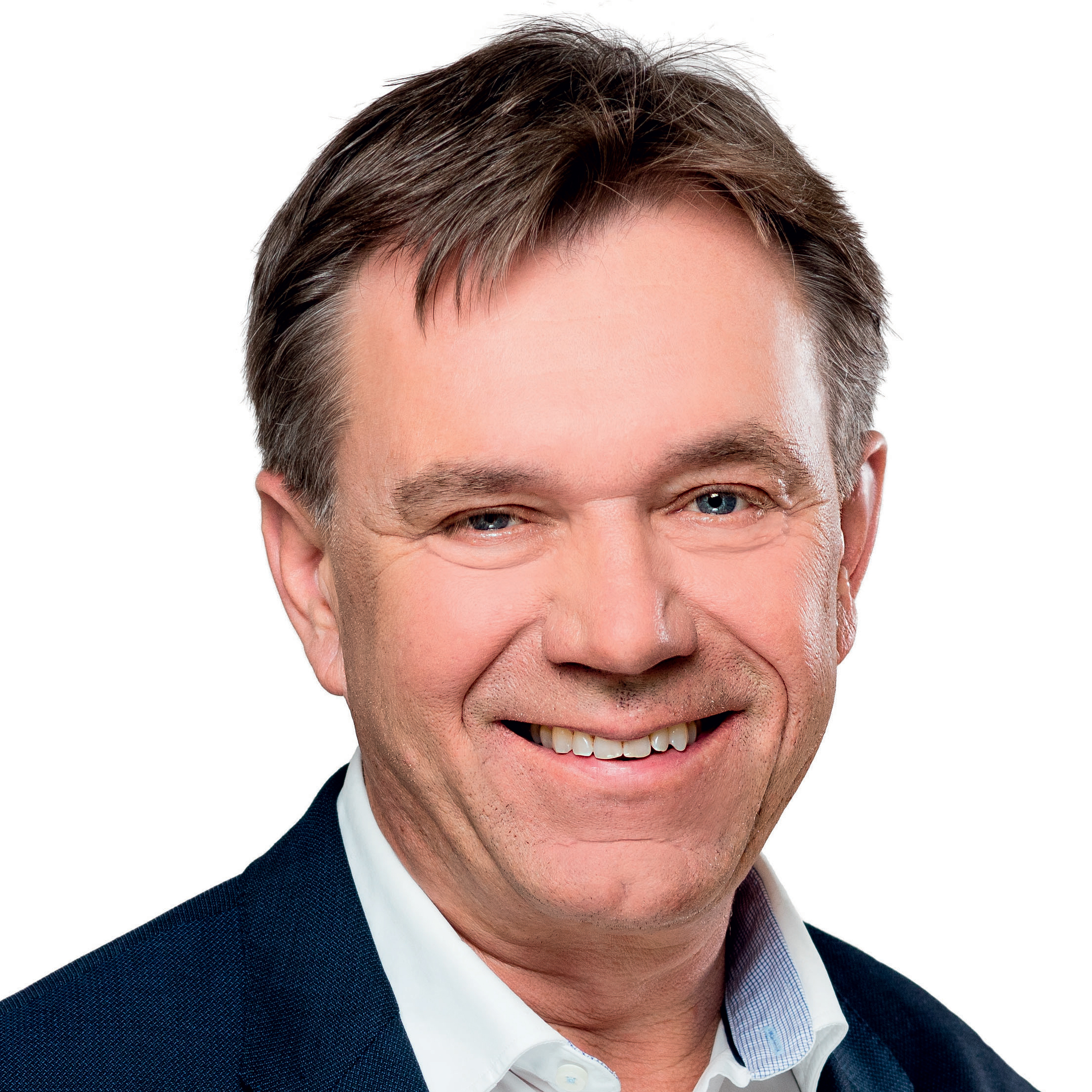
- Official portrait, 2023

Member of the National Council
- Incumbent
- Assumed office 27 February 2023
- Preceded by: Ruth Humbel
- Constituency: Canton of Aargau

Member of the Grand Council of Aargau
- In office 2017–2022

Personal details
- Born: Andreas Michael Meier; 11 February 1962 (age 64) Leuggern, Switzerland
- Children: 3
- Website: Official website Parliament website

Military service
- Allegiance: Switzerland
- Years of service: 1980–present
- Rank: Non-commissioned officer

Andreas Michael Meier (Swiss Standard German pronunciation: [anˈdreːas ˈmaɪɐ]; born 11 February 1962) is a Swiss businessman, agricultural engineer, oenologist and politician who currently serves on the National Council (Switzerland) for The Centre since 2023 where he succeeded Ruth Humbel. Meier previously served on the Grand Council of Aargau between 2017 and 2022.

== Early life and education ==
Meier was born 11 February 1962 in Leuggern, Switzerland to Anton Meier, a farmer and winemaker in the 16th generation, and Hildegard Meier (née Kern), a graduate of Hotelfachschule Zürich (HfZ). In 1964, his parents took-over the Weingut zum Sternen in Würenlingen. This property has been owned by the family since the 13th century. Meier was raised in Leuggern and attended the local schools.

== Personal life ==
Meier is in a domestic relationship, has three children and a grandchild. He resides in Klingnau.

He serves as non-commissioned officer in the Swiss Armed Forces.
