= Stefan Giezendanner =

Swiss businessman and politician

Member of the Grand Council of Aargau
- Incumbent
- Assumed office 10 April 2020
- Constituency: Zofingen District

Personal details
- Born: 1978 (age 47–48) Langenthal, Switzerland
- Party: Swiss People's Party
- Relations: Benjamin Giezendanner (brother)
- Parent: Ulrich Giezendanner
- Education: University of Applied Sciences Northwestern Switzerland; University of Lucerne
- Profession: Businessman, politician

Military service
- Allegiance: Switzerland
- Branch/service: Swiss Armed Forces
- Years of service: 1996 - present
- Rank: Colonel

Stefan Giezendanner (born 1978) is a Swiss businessman and politician. He serves as a member of the Grand Council of Aargau for the Swiss People's Party (SVP) since 2020. He is the eldest son of former National Councillor Ulrich Giezendanner (b. 1953) and brother of former Grand Councillor and current National Councillor Benjamin Giezendanner (b. 1982).

== Early life and education ==
Giezendanner was born the second eldest of four children of businessman and politician Ulrich Giezendanner (b. 1953) and his first wife Helene († 1997). He grew-up in Rothrist with his brother and sister. Another brother, Oliver, died in early childhood. His paternal grandfather, Johann Ulrich Giezendanner, hailed from Wattwil and settled in the municipality where he married a local woman. They founded and operated what today is known as the transportation and logistics group Giezendanner, in 1934. A maternal great-grandfather was among the founders of Stahlrohr AG (which would later be integrated into Benteler International).

He attended the local public schools and completed a banking apprenticeship and then studied economics at the University of Applied Sciences Northwestern Switzerland (FHNW). He also completed professional studies at the University of Lucerne and language studies abroad in New York.

== Career ==
From 2008, Giezendanner co-managed the growing Giezendanner Group alongside his younger brother Benjamin. However, by the end of 2018 he left the company due to internal discrepancies in the future management and business development of the group. He subsequently became Managing Partner of Mittelland Transport AG in Aarau, of which the family also has interest. He remained a board member of several Giezendanner companies as well as a member of the board of trustees of Aargauische Stiftung für Freiheit und Verantwortung in Politik und Wirtschaft (en. Argovian Foundation of Freedom and Independence in Politics and Economy) in Aarau.

== Politics ==
Giezendanner became a councillor of the city council of Zofingen in 2006. A position he continues to hold until 2024, but he commented to not seeking re-election. In 2019, he briefly was a potential candidate for governing council of the Canton of Aargau.

Since 2020, he serves as a member in the Grand Council of Aargau.

== Personal life ==
Giezendanner is married, and resides in Baden.

In the Swiss Armed Forces he held the rank of lieutenant colonel in the General Staff. Since 1 January 2023 he was promoted to colonel in the General Staff.
