= Manuela Ernst =

Swiss politician (born 1985)

Manuela Ernst (born 1985) is a Swiss politician (glp). She is a member of the Grand Council of the Canton of Aargau.

== Politics ==
Since January 5, 2021 Ernst is a member of the legislative of the canton of Aargau, the Grand Council. She is also a member of the parliament of her home town Wettingen.
