= Martina Bircher =

Swiss politician (born 1984)

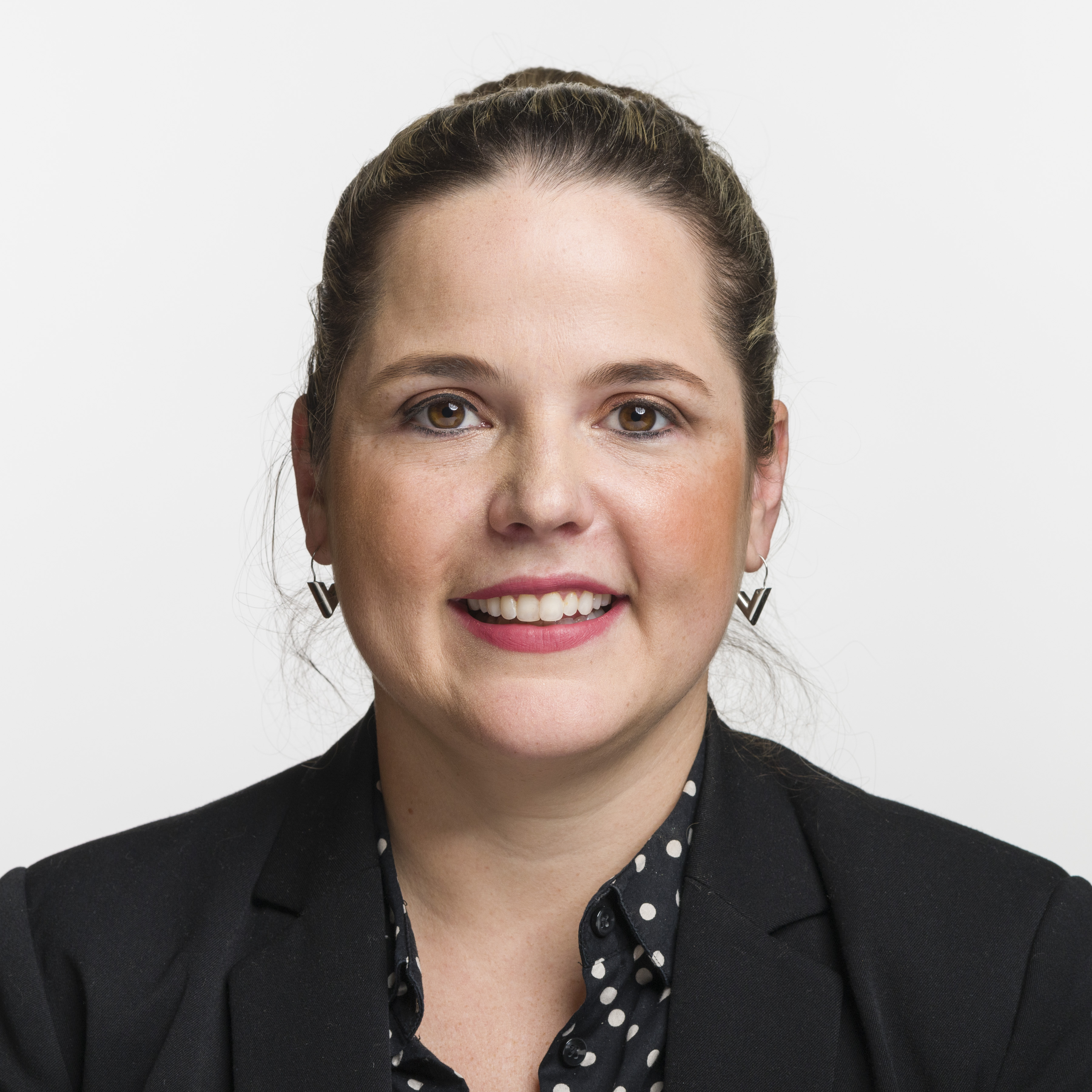
- Martina Bircher (2019)

Member of the Executive Council of Aargau
- Incumbent
- Assumed office January 2025

Member of the National Council (Switzerland)
- In office 2 December 2019 – 15 December 2024
- Succeeded by: Christian Glur

Personal details
- Born: Martina Bircher; 16 April 1984 (age 42) Zürich, Zürich, Switzerland
- Domestic partner: Fabian Meyer (since 2012)
- Children: 1
- Education: University of Applied Sciences Northwestern Switzerland
- Website: martina-bircher.ch (in German)

Martina Bircher (German: [maʁˈtiːna ˈbɪʁçɐ]; born 13 April 1984) is a Swiss economist and politician who currently is a member-elect of the Executive Council of Aargau. She served as a member of the National Council (Switzerland) for the Swiss People's Party between 2019 and 2024.

== Early life and education ==
Bircher was born 13 April 1984 in Zürich, Switzerland. She primarily grew-up in Niederwil, Aargau where she attended public schools. She initially completed a commercial apprenticeship at Alu Menziken. Bircher then studied economics at the University of Applied Sciences Northwestern Switzerland with a major in controlling.

== Professional career ==
Bircher had her initial work experience in the retail field before joining Swiss Post in 2014, in a project manager position. She currently works as a self-employed consultant and advisor (Bircher Consulting) and is a paid member of ZofingenRegio, a regional association. Further, she volunteers on several board of trustees, such as; Winterhilfe Aargau, Villmergen (welfare services); AGS Aargauer Suchthilfe, Aarau (addiction treatment and prevention); Willy-Mettler-Stiftung, Aarburg (integration of disabled people) as well as an executive director of PIKOM, Aarau (non-partisan information committee) and Perspective CH in Aarau.

== Politics ==
In 2013, she campaigned for a seat on the municipal council of Aarburg, as a member of the Swiss People's Party. Bircher assumed office in 2014 and took-over the commission for social services, health and youth. Since 2017, when she was elected into Grand Council of Aargau, she has served in the social services and health commission. Subsequently, she was elected in the 2019 Swiss federal election to serve as a member of the National Council (Switzerland) assuming office on 2 December 2019.

== Personal life ==
Bircher is in a relationship with Fabian Meyer, who is a homemaker. They have one son.
