= Christian Glur =

Swiss farmer and politician

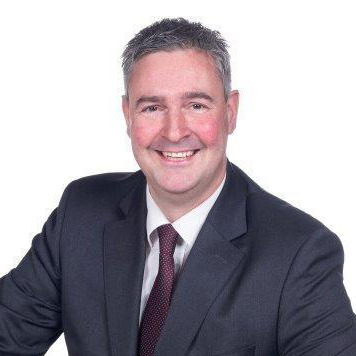

Member of the National Council (Switzerland)
- Incumbent
- Assumed office 16 November 2024
- Preceded by: Martina Bircher
- Constituency: Canton of Aargau

Member of the Grand Council of Aargau
- In office 2009 – 2024

Personal details
- Born: Christian Glur; 21 October 1975 (age 50) Zofingen, Switzerland
- Party: Swiss People's Party
- Spouse: Ramona Amport (m. 2011)
- Children: 2
- Parent: Walter Glur (father)
- Occupation: Farmer, politician, agricultural mechanic
- Website: Official website Parliament website

Military service
- Allegiance: Switzerland
- Branch/service: Swiss Armed Forces
- Rank: Oberleutnant

Christian Glur (German pronunciation: [ˈkʁɪstjan ˈɡluːɐ̯]; born 21 November 1975) is a Swiss farmer and politician who currently serves as a member of the National Council (Switzerland) for the Swiss People's Party since 2024. He previously served on the Grand Council of Aargau between 2009 and 2024.

== Early life and education ==
Glur was born 21 November 1975 in Zofingen, Switzerland, to Walter Glur, a farmer and politician, and Annalise Glur (née König), a teacher and district judge. He was raised on the family farm in Glashütten (presently part of Murgenthal). He had an older brother, Hans Ulrich (died 1999), and a younger sister, Maya Weber (née Glur).

His father also served on the National Council from 1999 to 2011. His paternal grandparents were buying the Glur family farm in the 1960s, and in 1968 it was titled "one of the most modern farms in Switzerland" by magazine Die Tat. They were originally from Oftringen, where the family has been farming for over three hundred years prior to that.

Between 1992 and 1996, he completed an apprenticeship, as an agricultural machinery mechanic. In 1998, he completed officers training of the Swiss Armed Forces, and ultimately studied agronomy, which he completed with a Master's degree (Meisterlandwirt) in 2003.

== Politics ==
Between 2009 and 2024, Glur served as a member of the Grand Council of Aargau, where he was also a member on the commissions for environment, construction, traffic as well as energy and urban planning.

In November 2024, he was elected as lateral entrant, into National Council (Switzerland), as his predecessor, Martina Bircher, resigned upon accepting her election into the Executive Council of Aargau. Glur assumed office on 16 November 2024.

== Personal life ==
In 2011, Glur married Ramona Amport, with whom he has two children.
