= Wittnau, Aargau =

Wittnau
- Municipality
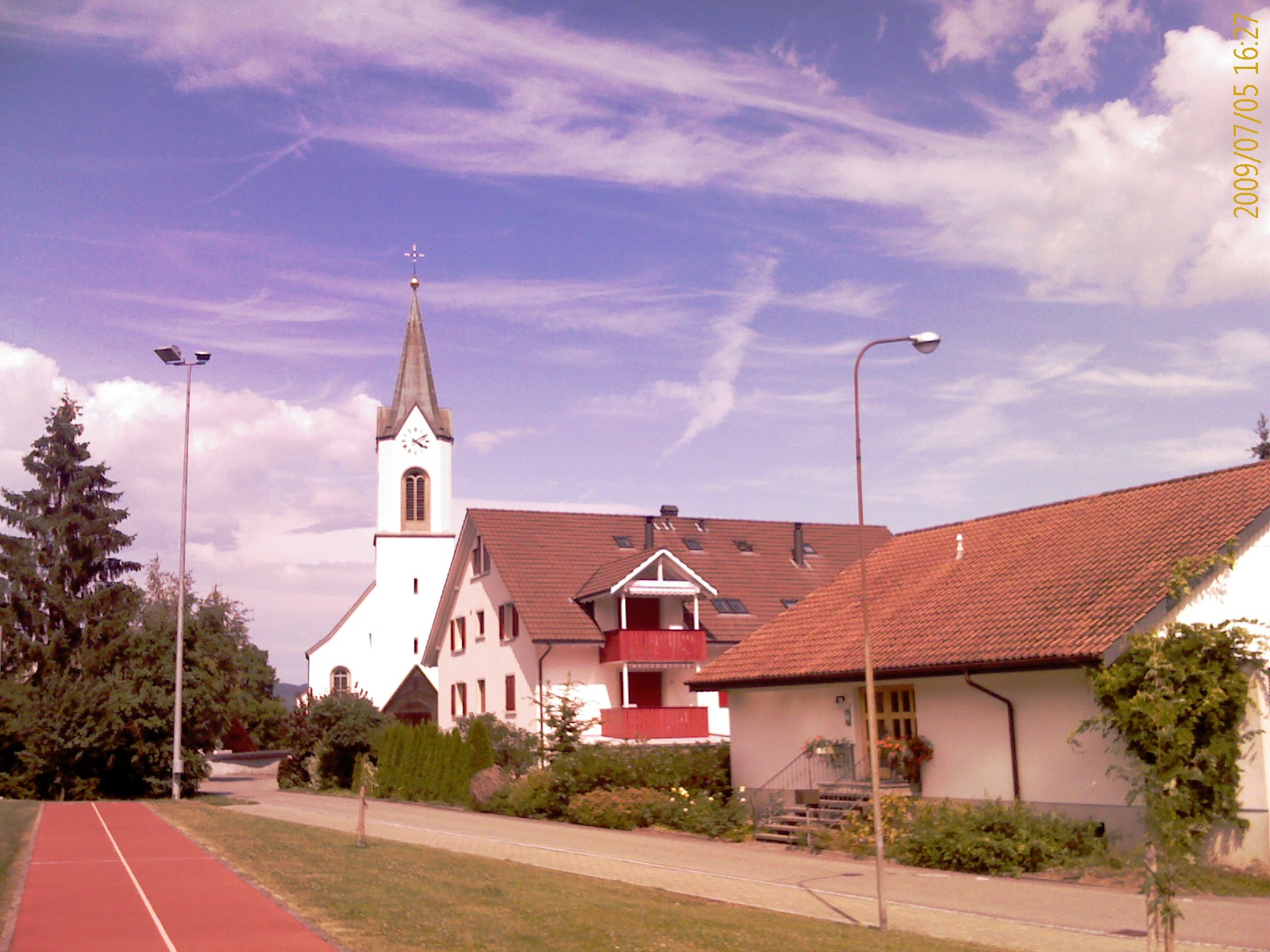

- Flag Coat of arms
- Location of Wittnau
- Location within Switzerland Location within Canton of Aargau
- Coordinates: 47°29′N 7°59′E
- Country: Switzerland
- Canton: Aargau
- District: Laufenburg

Area
  - Total: 11.25 km^{2} (4.34 sq mi)
- Elevation: 411 m (1,348 ft)

Population (December 2006)
  - Total: 1,127
  - Density: 100.2/km^{2} (259.5/sq mi)
- Time zone: UTC+01:00 (CET)
  - Summer (DST): UTC+02:00 (CEST)
- Postal code: 5064
- SFOS number: 4181
- ISO 3166 code: CH-AG
- Surrounded by: Anwil (BL), Gipf-Oberfrick, Kienberg (SO), Rothenfluh (BL), Wegenstetten, Wölflinswil
- Twin towns: Wittnau (Germany)
- Website: www.wittnau.ch

Wittnau is a municipality in the district of Laufenburg in the canton of Aargau in Switzerland.

== Geography ==
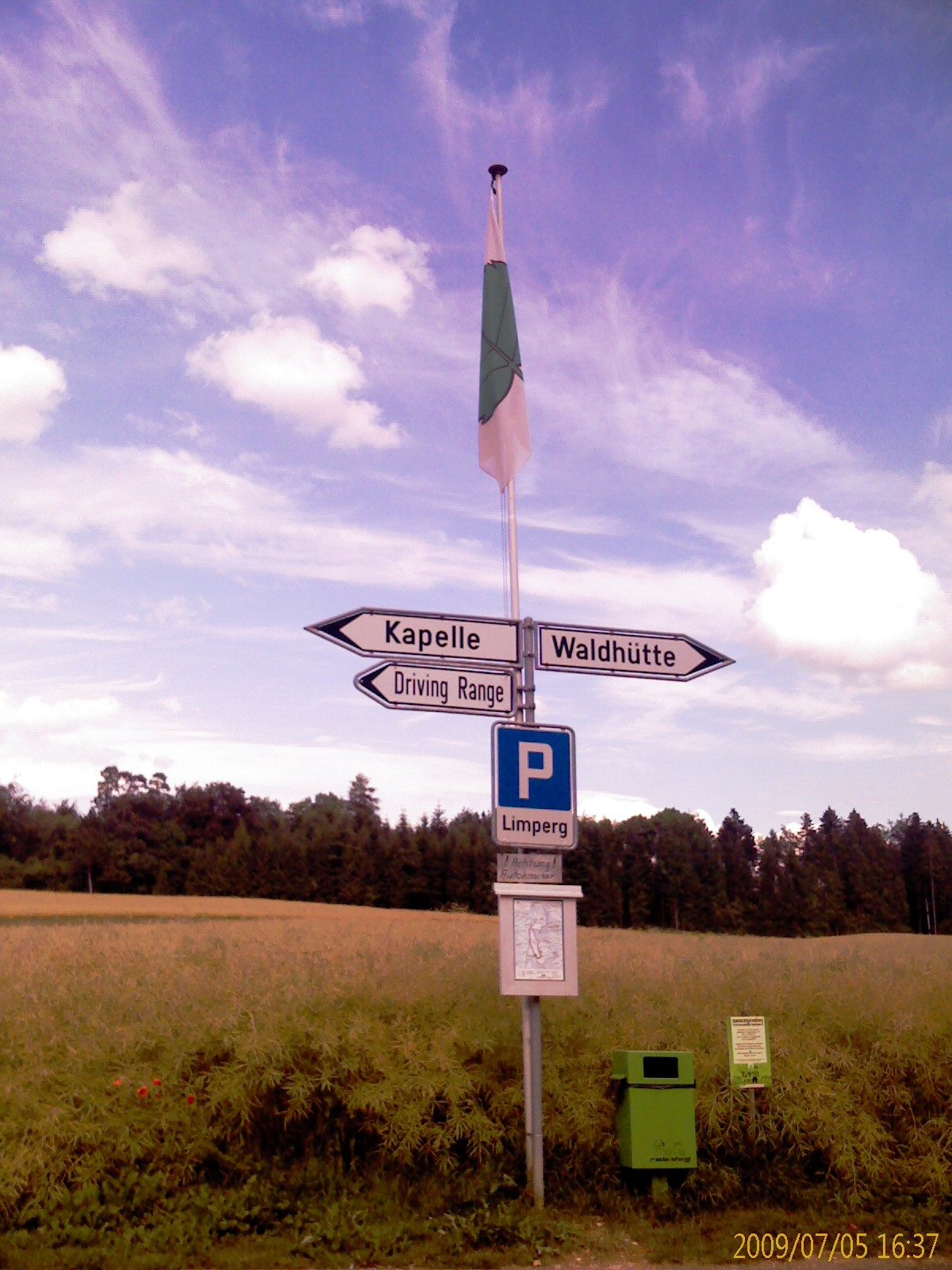
Sign in Limperg village in Wittnau

Wittnau has an area, as of 2009, of 11.25 square kilometers (4.34 sq mi). Of this area, 4.42 km^{2} (1.71 sq mi) or 39.3% is used for agricultural purposes, while 6.05 km^{2} (2.34 sq mi) or 53.8% is forested. Of the rest of the land, 0.75 km^{2} (0.29 sq mi) or 6.7% is settled (buildings or roads), 0.03 km^{2} (7.4 acres) or 0.3% is either rivers or lakes.

Of the built up area, housing and buildings made up 2.7% and transportation infrastructure made up 3.3%. Out of the forested land, 52.4% of the total land area is heavily forested and 1.4% is covered with orchards or small clusters of trees. Of the agricultural land, 21.6% is used for growing crops and 13.4% is pastures, while 4.3% is used for orchards or vine crops. All the water in the municipality is in rivers and streams.

== Coat of arms ==
The blazon of the municipal coat of arms is Azure two Eagles in pale displayed Argent langued beaked and membered Gules.

== Demographics ==
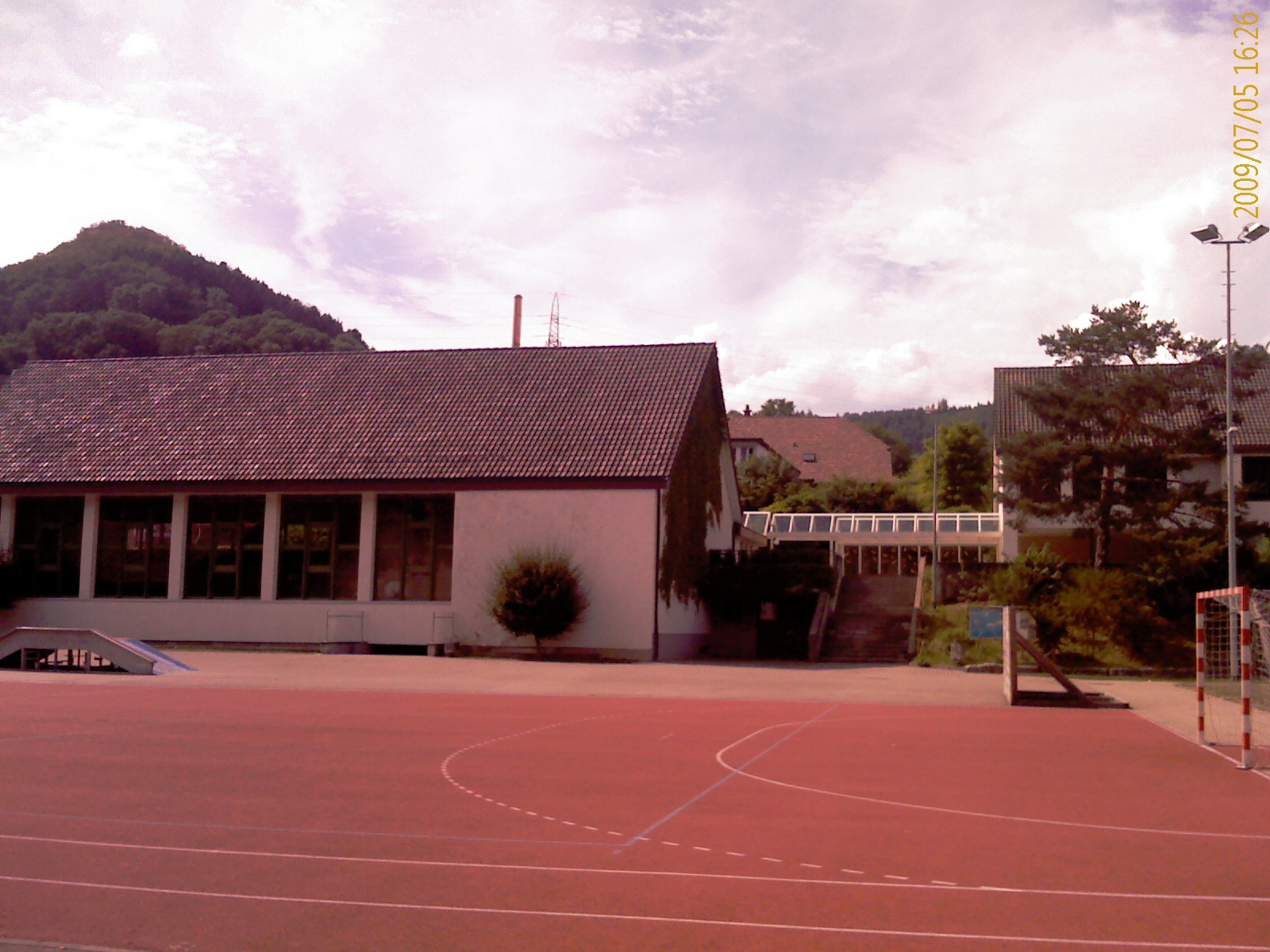
Wittnau school

Aerial view (1950)

Wittnau has a population (as of December 2020) of 1,365 As of June 2009, 8.7% of the population are foreign nationals. Over the last 10 years (1997–2007) the population has changed at a rate of 2.4%. Most of the population (as of 2000) speaks German (92.8%), with Albanian being second most common ( 2.7%) and Italian being third ( 1.1%).

The age distribution, as of 2008, in Wittnau is; 99 children or 8.8% of the population are between 0 and 9 years old and 191 teenagers or 17.0% are between 10 and 19. Of the adult population, 122 people or 10.9% of the population are between 20 and 29 years old. 137 people or 12.2% are between 30 and 39, 230 people or 20.5% are between 40 and 49, and 158 people or 14.1% are between 50 and 59. The senior population distribution is 94 people or 8.4% of the population are between 60 and 69 years old, 48 people or 4.3% are between 70 and 79, there are 35 people or 3.1% who are between 80 and 89, and there are 9 people or 0.8% who are 90 and older.

As of 2000, there were 33 homes with 1 or 2 persons in the household, 171 homes with 3 or 4 persons in the household, and 202 homes with 5 or more persons in the household. As of 2000, there were 429 private households (homes and apartments) in the municipality, and an average of 2.6 persons per household. In 2008 there were 216 single family homes (or 45.4% of the total) out of a total of 476 homes and apartments. There were a total of 1 empty apartments for a 0.2% vacancy rate. As of 2007, the construction rate of new housing units was 3.6 new units per 1000 residents.

In the 2007 federal election the most popular party was the SVP which received 37.7% of the vote. The next three most popular parties were the CVP (18.9%), the SP (15.6%) and the FDP (9.6%).

In Wittnau about 76.7% of the population (between age 25-64) have completed either non-mandatory upper secondary education or additional higher education (either university or a Fachhochschule). Of the school age population (in the 2008/2009 school year), there are 94 students attending primary school in the municipality.

The historical population is given in the following table:

Historical population
| Year | Pop. | ±% |
|---|---|---|
| 1975 | 791 | — |
| 1980 | 790 | −0.1% |
| 1990 | 928 | +17.5% |
| 2000 | 1,139 | +22.7% |

== Heritage sites of national significance ==
The Alt Homberg Castle ruin and the Wittnauer Horn (site of a prehistoric hill settlement, a Roman era settlement and an Early Middle Ages fortification) are listed as Swiss heritage sites of national significance. The entire village of Wittnau is designated as part of the Inventory of Swiss Heritage Sites.

== Economy ==
As of 2007, Wittnau had an unemployment rate of 1.06%. As of 2005, there were 52 people employed in the primary economic sector and about 18 businesses involved in this sector. 106 people are employed in the secondary sector and there are 16 businesses in this sector. 63 people are employed in the tertiary sector, with 22 businesses in this sector.

In 2000 there were 566 workers who lived in the municipality. Of these, 436 or about 77.0% of the residents worked outside Wittnau while 168 people commuted into the municipality for work. There were a total of 298 jobs (of at least 6 hours per week) in the municipality. Of the working population, 17.8% used public transportation to get to work, and 54.8% used a private car.

== Religion ==
From the 2000 census, 715 or 63.2% were Roman Catholic, while 205 or 18.1% belonged to the Swiss Reformed Church. Of the rest of the population, there were 4 individuals (or about 0.35% of the population) who belonged to the Christian Catholic faith.
