= Benteler International =

Holding company

Benteler International Austria GmbH
- Industry: Automotive supplier, Steel/Tube production
- Founded: 1876; 150 years ago
- Headquarters: Salzburg, Austria
- Key people: Ralf Göttel, CEO; Thomas Glynn, CFO
- Revenue: € 8.046 billion (2025)
- Number of employees: 20.668
- Website: Official website

Benteler International Austria GmbH (BENTELER) is a holding company in German family ownership. The Group companies operate worldwide in the fields of automotive technology, steel and tube production, engineering, and autonomous mobility. The headquarters of Benteler International Austria GmbH is in Salzburg (Austria), as of 2010. The company is owned by the Benteler family.

The Group is structured in four divisions: BENTELER Automotive Components, BENTELER Automotive Modules, BENTELER Steel/Tube and HOLON. As well as BENTELER International Austria GmbH, BENTELER Business Services GmbH, based in Paderborn, Germany, also carries out additional holding functions.

BENTELER's automotive divisions develop and produce automotive components, modules, and systems, including chassis and structural components, as well as solutions supporting vehicle electrification. BENTELER Steel/Tube produces steel and manufactures seamless and welded steel tubes for the automotive, energy, and industrial sectors.

HOLON focuses on autonomous and electric mobility solutions. The company develops and industrializes autonomous shuttle vehicles such as the fully electric HOLON urban, designed for use in public transport and on-demand mobility services. The business model was expanded through the acquisition of the mobility technology company ioki, adding software-based mobility platforms and services for autonomous transport solutions.

The BENTELER Group employs more than 20,000 people at 90 locations in 24 countries; approximately 8,000 of those employees are in Germany. Revenue in the 2025 financial year was €8.046 billion.

== History ==
=== Foundation ===
In 1876 Carl Benteler took over a hardware store in Bielefeld. From an early stage, the small hardware store offered an unusually wide range of products – from household appliances such as kitchen scales and bread slicers to washing machines. 1908 his son Eduard Benteler took over. 1914 the first patent application, “Window bars made from steel tube”, was filed. For the first time, the product that would become central to the company’s history – the tube – is specifically mentioned. In 1916 Eduard Benteler then bought an engineering factory in Bielefeld in which drawn tubes were manufactured for the first time in 1918. In 1922 Eduard Benteler founded the Benteler-Werke Aktiengesellschaft, which in 1923 started production of seamless and welded tubes in Paderborn and Schloß Neuhaus. In 1935 the company won its first major order from the automotive industry: Benteler produced exhaust pipes for the Ford Eifel. During the Second World War anti-aircraft guns were made in the Benteler factory in Bielefeld (including anti-aircraft guns 2-cm-Flak 38 and 2-cm-Flakvierling 38), until the factory was destroyed in 1944 in an air raid. From 1943 Benteler employed several hundred forced labourers, including prisoners of war.

Following the Second World War Eduard Benteler's sons Erich and Helmut built up the works again and greatly expanded the product range. Benteler was now supplying to the bicycle and car industries, it was producing seamless and hot rolled tubes and machinery for textile fishing, plastics and glass processing. In the buildings of the former military airfield Paderborn-Mönkeloh Benteler worked with the racing driver and car-maker Hermann Holbein: Between 1950 and 1952 about 2,000 "Champion" cars were produced. After that, for a short time, Delta refrigerators were made in Mönkeloh. In 1966 radiators remain part of the product portfolio for the next 20 years, until production was finally discontinued in 1986 in favor of forming technology, which was significantly more profitable. In 1974, the Benteler electric steel mill in Lingen began producing more environmentally friendly steel. Since 1980, the company has expanded internationally starting with the first Benteler Automobiltechnik GmbH location in the USA.

In 1991, Hubertus Benteler took over as management responsibility and turned the company into a global partner to the automotive industry. Shortly thereafter, BENTELER opened its first location in Mexico in 1992. The first location in China followed in 2002. In 2015, the Steel/Tube Division strengthened its position in the international market with a hot rolling mill in Shreveport. With the founding of HOLON, the company has been underscoring its ambitions in the global market for autonomous mobility since 2022.

=== Consolidation and development of the main business areas ===
==== Steel/Tube ====
In 1955 the first steel was poured in the newly built steel works at Paderborn-Schloß Neuhaus, and in 1958 the world's first continuous casting plant went into operation there. In 1974 the electric steel mill in Lingen (Ems) started production, and still today this plant is producing steel for the company's own hot rolling mills in Dinslaken and Paderborn and for external customers.

In 2007 Benteler took over the Swiss company Rothrist Rohr AG, which makes precision welded tubes, mainly for the automotive industry. With this steel tube plants in Rothrist and Bottrop passed into Group ownership. In 2011 there was a major fire in the hot rolling mill of Benteler Steel Tube GmbH in Dinslaken and production had to be stopped for several months. In 2015 Benteler Steel/Tube opened a hot rolling mill in Shreveport, Louisiana.

==== Automotive ====
In 1977 car axles were produced for the first time at the Benteler location in Paderborn-Talle, which was founded in 1956. Today this plant is the most important components factory in the Automotive Division. In 1985 a transfer line was installed for the first major order to manufacture rear axle beams.

In 1979 the company started to expand worldwide with the opening of its first plant in the US. From 1991 onwards Benteler specialized also in the just-in-time production and delivery of pre-finished components for automotive manufacturers. The automotive technology business area was now larger than the steel tube area. From now on new Benteler plants were opened almost every year. In order to deliver efficiently to local automotive manufacturers, production locations were opened or taken over in North America (from 1979, 9 plants to 2018), South America (from 1996, 6 plants), Southern Europe (from 1990, 15 plants), Eastern Europe (from 1995, 10 plants), Northern Europe (from 2009, 3 plants) and Asia (from 2000, 15 plants). In 2018, the plant in Chongquing was opened as a further production facility in China, as part of a joint venture with the Chinese company Changan Automobile Group. Benteler also opened a new plant in Klášterec nad Ohří in the Czech Republic in 2018. In 2019, a new plant was opened in Mos, Spain.

In 2008, in cooperation with the Wiesbaden-based SGL Group, Benteler set up the company Benteler SGL, a joint venture specialized in lightweight carbon materials, to supplement the focus on steel with competence in lightweight engineering. In early 2009 this joint venture took over Fischer Composite Technology GmbH in Ried im Innkreis, Austria. In November 2017 Benteler and the SGL Group agreed on the sale of Benteler's 50-percent joint venture participation in the SGL Group; this sale then took place in the same year. Also in 2009 Benteler acquired the Automotive Structures division of the Norwegian company Norsk Hydro, an international aluminum producer based in Oslo. In 2012 the company purchased the aluminum pressure-casting operations of Farsund Aluminium Casting (FAC) in Norway.

==== Distribution ====
In 1957, in Berlin, Benteler opened its first tube and steel warehouse, which today is a part of the Distribution Division. Over the years Benteler founded or took over more than 50 distribution and warehouse subsidiaries in Europe, Asia and Australia. Benteler Most recently, before the sale, Benteler Distribution had 24 national companies in Europe and Asia, and other associated distribution companies in Germany, Switzerland, Northern and Eastern Europe. In April 2014 construction work officially started on the new central warehouse in Duisburg port. Completed in 2015 this location, which has Europe's biggest high-bay facility, has over 35,000 square meters of storage space for 27,000 tons of tubes.

On August 27, 2019, the BENTELER Group announced the sale of the BENTELER Distribution Division (trading of steel tubes) to the Van Leeuwen Pipe and Tube Group. Background of this divestment is an increased focus on the automotive business. The sale was completed on November 29, 2019. The Distribution Division is now part of the Van Leeuwen Pipe and Tube Group.

=== Restructuring ===
In 1999 Benteler was reorganized as a holding company with initially four independently operating business areas of Automotive, Steel/Tube, Engineering (integrated in 2005 into Automotive) and Distribution.

In 2010 the newly founded Benteler International AG, headquartered in Salzburg, took over the strategic management function of the Group. The operational business, with the Divisions Automotive and Steel/Tube has since then been organized in Benteler Business Service GmbH (until 2016 Benteler Deutschland GmbH) which is headquartered in Paderborn.

In April 2017 the long-standing Chairman of the executive board moved to the supervisory board. Ralf Göttel, until then Head of the Automotive Division, took over as CEO. For the first time in the company's 140-year history, the reins are not in the hands of a family member.

=== Trends in employee numbers and revenue ===
In 1976, one hundred years after the company was founded, Benteler employed 9,000 people and for the first time it surpassed DM1 billion in revenues. In 1995 company revenue broke through the €3 billion level. In 2001 the Group employed 17,000 people worldwide.

According to a survey by the trade publication "Die deutsche Wirtschaft", Benteler was ranked 27th in 2017 in the list of the largest family-owned businesses in Germany.

== Business activity ==
=== Business areas ===
==== Automotive ====
With approximately 17,000 employees (counted in full-time equivalents), more than 70 plants in 22 countries and revenue (2022) of around €7.3 billion, Benteler Automotive is the biggest Division. This business area develops and manufactures components and modules in the areas of chassis, body, engines and exhaust systems as well as solutions for electric vehicles. The following areas are part of Benteler Automotive

- Chassis & Modules: Lightweight-optimized chassis components, development and assembly of highly complex modules (e.g. axle modules and front-end modules)
- Engine & Exhaust Systems: Powertrain systems and components (engine and exhaust systems) to reduce emissions and CO_{2}
- Electro-Mobility: Lightweight-optimized systems for use in electric vehicles (scalable battery trays, electrified front and rear axles, battery storage systems with thermomanagement)
- Mechanical Engineering: Glass machinery manufacture; machines, systems and tools for the automotive industry
- Lightweight Protection: Weight-optimized products for vehicle protection

==== Steel/Tube ====
The Benteler Steel/Tube Division employs around 3,000 people (full-time equivalents) in Europe and the US. The Division owns five production sites as well as several sales offices and generated around €1.2 billion in 2024.

Benteler Steel/Tube develops and produces steel and standard and customized seamless and welded steel tubes for a diverse range of applications, for example in the chemicals and petrochemicals industry, in vehicle and machine engineering and in the energy sector. Also offered is first-stage processing, for example surface coating, bending of U-pipes and serpentine tubes, cutting to desired lengths and processing of tube ends.

The following areas are part of Benteler Steel/Tube

- Energy: Tubes for oil and gas exploration (drill pipes, casings tubing, hollow carriers for perforating guns), for pipelines and for heat transfer in energy-generation plants and in the chemicals industry (boiler tubes, heat exchanger tubes, multi-lead rifled tubes – for use in high-pressure boiler systems and power stations with fossil fuels, individually processed serpentine tubes).
- Automotive: Custom-made steel tube solutions for vehicle construction (incl. drive shafts, lines and injection tubes, camshafts, structural parts for vehicles, seat-belt tensioners, shells for airbag generators and hood-lifting systems, precision tubes for steering and gas springs)
- Industry: With its sections on construction (steel tubes for engineering and plant construction, for the construction and machining industries, for wind turbines) and hydraulics (corrosion-protected cylinder tubes, piston tubes, line tubes for agricultural and construction machinery and commercial vehicles)

==== Glass Processing Equipment ====
The business area Glass Processing Equipment, associated to the division Automotive, generated revenues of around €55 million in 2019. This business develops and builds glass-processing machinery and plant for flat glass that is used in the construction, automotive, solar and display glass industries. For the areas of architectural glass, automotive glass and technical glass, the company supplies grinding machines, drilling machines, washing machines and screen-printing machines, plus complex processing lines (combination of machines), CNC processing centers, systems to manufacture laminated glass, systems for assembling solar modules, mirror-coating lines, production lines for automotive glass (windscreens, side lites and rear windows), and handling systems for automatic loading of systems and production lines (robots, portal stackers, specialized systems for automotive glass).

==== Associated activities ====
The wider BENTELER network covers additional companies that maintain entrepreneurial connections to the Benteler Group. One of these is Benteler Trading International AG (BTI), a global supply chain services company specializing in third‑party inventory ownership. The company buys, holds, and sells inventory on behalf of its clients, assuming ownership at various points in the supply chain to support operational continuity and flexibility. BTI’s services cover inbound logistics, warehousing, production line integration, outbound distribution, and global trade compliance, including Importer of Record (IOR) and Exporter of Record (EOR) capabilities. Operating across multiple industries and geographies, BTI supports the management of raw materials, work-in-progress, and finished goods. BTIs inventory ownership and Asset-as-a-Service models are used to mitigate supply chain risk, manage demand variability, and optimise working capital while maintaining scalable and resilient supply chain operations.

=== Locations ===
Benteler has around 90 locations in 24 countries in Africa, Asia, Europe, North and South America.

In Germany Benteler has subsidiaries (plants, sales and engineering offices, warehouses, offices) in 22 cities. Benteler plants are located in the German cities of Paderborn-Talle, Bielefeld, Düsseldorf, Saarlouis, Siegen-Weidenau, Kleinenberg, Warburg, Eisenach and Schwandorf (Automotive and Glass Processing) and in Schloß Neuhaus, Paderborn, Lingen, Dinslaken.

In the Czech Republic, Benteler operates automotive component plants in Chrastava, Jablonec nad Nisou, Klášterec nad Ohří, Liberec and Rumburk. Chrastava serves as a regional headquarters, while other facilities in Liberec and Olomouc manufacture industrial machinery and tooling. The company also has an engineering centre in Liberec and shared-service offices in Prague and Třebíč.

=== Miscellaneous ===
==== Research and development ====
In 2024 the Group invested €59 million in these areas and filed 29 patent applications. The research and development activity focused on the fields of lightweight construction, safety and efficiency in automotive technology and on materials development in Steel/Tube.

==== Social engagement and sponsoring ====
At the University of Paderborn the company has been funding an endowed professorship in lightweight construction in cars since 2007. Benteler is also the main sponsor of the “UPBracing Team” of the University of Paderborn, which takes part each year in the competition to build a racing car in the “Formula-Student-Events”. Since 2012 Benteler has been a name sponsor of the Benteler Arena of the football club SC Paderborn 07.

In Paderborn/Schloß Neuhaus Benteler has been operating the children's day nursery “Rohrspatzen” since 2008.

Logo

The Benteler logo - a triangle, made up of three smaller triangles and standing on its tip - has been used since 1949. The three small triangles stood for Eduard Benteler's children - Ilse, Erich and Helmut - who became owners of the company, in equal parts, after the death of their father. The enclosing larger triangle is meant to symbolize the continuation of the company as a whole.

== Company structure ==
The strategic holding company of the Benteler Group is Benteler International Austria GmbH, headquartered in Salzburg (Austria). The 2024 Annual Report lists 89 subsidiaries and associated companies. In 2024 the automotive business comprised a total of 62 companies. As well as national Automotive companies, these include companies that belong to the business areas Aluminum Systems, JIT (Just-in-Time production), Lightweight Protection and Engineering, joint Ventures with Chinese companies: Benteler JianAn Automotive (since 2015), Shanghai Benteler Huizhong (since 2002) and the joint venture with the German SGL Group, the end of which (through the sale of Benteler's shares) was announced in November 2017 by the partners. The Steel/Tube Division comprised in 2024 8 companies, the Distribution Division 27 companies – among them the national companies and a 75-percent share in the Swedish steel tube trading company Heléns Rör (the remaining shares are held by the steel company SSAB). The Distribution division has been sold to Van Leeuwen Pipe and Tube Group on November 29, 2019 (please see paragraph "Consolidation and development of the main business areas" in this article).
