= Aargau (constituency) =

Aargau is the constituency that represents the canton of Aargau in the National Council. As of the 2019 federal election, the constituency has 429,516 voters who elect 16 National Council members.

== History ==
The constituency of Aargau was first created in 1848 to represent the canton of Aargau in the National Council. At that time, nine seats in the National Council was allocated to the canton. A National Council election law passed on 21 December 1850 divided the constituency into three: Aargau-Southwest (36th Constituency), Aargau-Central (37th Constituency) and Aargau-North (38th Constituency). The changes were implemented in the 1851 federal election.

After proportional representation was adopted in 1918, the constituency was formed again through a National Council election law on 14 February 1919. It was allocated 12 seats in the National Council in 1919. This increased to 13 seats in 1951, 14 seats in 1971, 15 seats in 1995, and to its current 16 seats in 2015.

== National Council members ==
=== Elected members ===
Election	Seats	Party	Elected member
1848	9	Radical Left	Johann Peter Bruggisser; Johann Dössekel; Adolf Fischer; Friedrich Frey-Herosé; Johann Ulrich Hanauer; Gottlieb Jäger; Karl Ferdinand Schimpf; Karl Rudolf Tanner
1848	9	Liberal Centre	Jakob Isler
Constituency abolished from 1851 until 1919
1919	12	BGB	Heinrich Roman Abt; Jakob Baumann; Richard Zschokke
1919	12	FDP	Otto Hunziker; Emil Keller; Josef Jäger
1919	12	KVP	Franz Xaver Eggspühler; Josef Jakob Strebel; Alfred Wyrsch
1919	12	SP	Karl Killer; Hermann Müri; Arthur Schmid Sr.
1922	12	SP	Karl Killer; Hermann Müri; Arthur Schmid Sr.; Adolf Welti
1922	12	BGB	Heinrich Roman Abt; Jakob Baumann; Richard Zschokke
1922	12	KVP	Franz Xaver Eggspühler; Emil Nietlispach; Alfred Wyrsch
1922	12	FDP	Otto Hunziker; Josef Jäger
1925	12	SP	Karl Killer; Hermann Müri; Arthur Schmid Sr.; Adolf Welti
1925	12	BGB	Heinrich Roman Abt; Jakob Baumann; Richard Zschokke
1925	12	KVP	Franz Xaver Eggspühler; Hans Fricker; Emil Nietlispach
1925	12	FDP	Otto Hunziker; Emil Keller
1928	12	SP	Karl Killer; Hermann Müri; Arthur Schmid Sr.; Adolf Welti
1928	12	BGB	Heinrich Roman Abt; Jakob Baumann; Richard Zschokke
1928	12	KVP	Franz Xaver Eggspühler; Hans Fricker; Emil Nietlispach
1928	12	FDP	Otto Hunziker; Emil Keller
