= Ioki =

German technology company

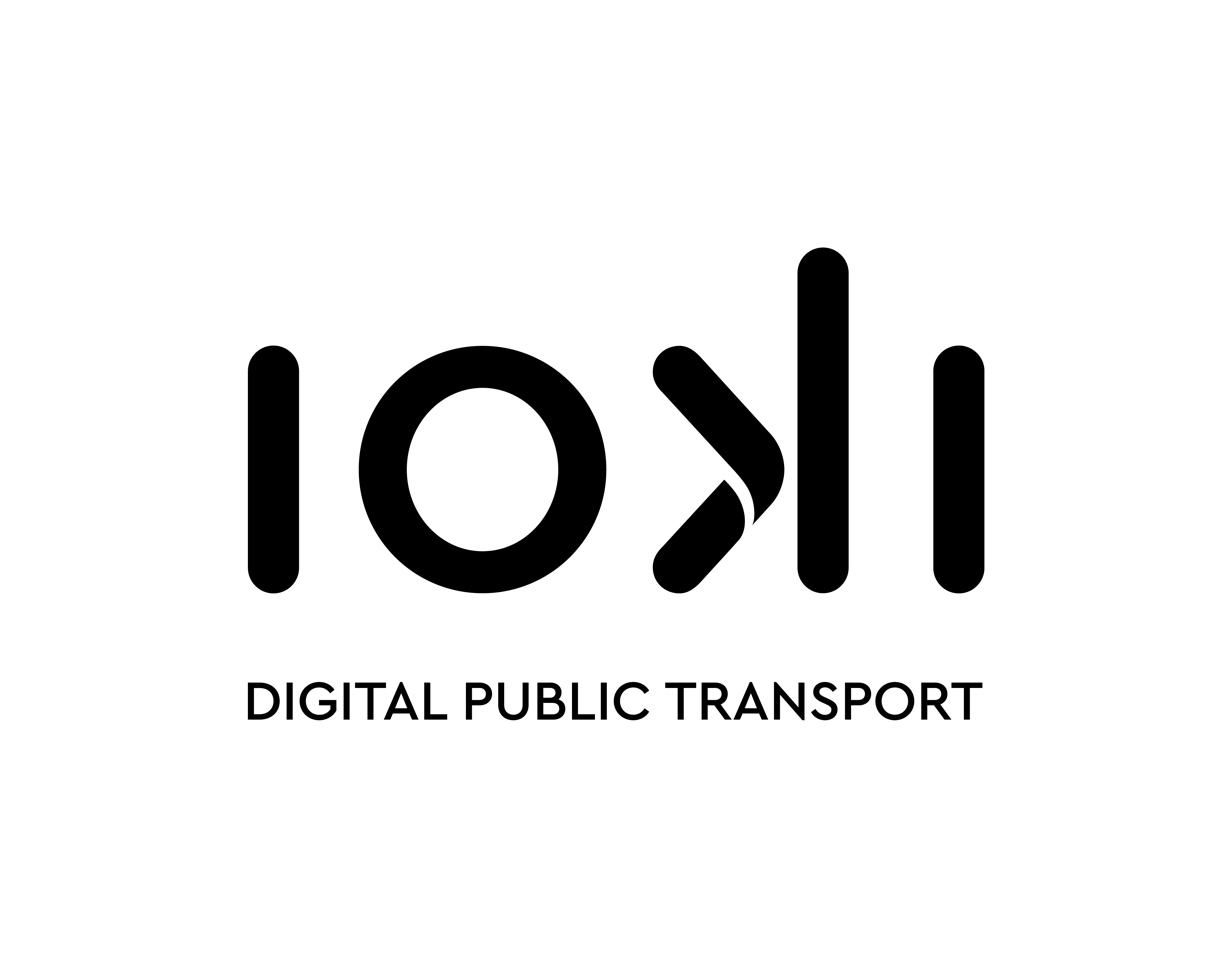
- Founded: 2017
- Website: https://ioki.com/

ioki is a German technology company specialising on digital services and products for public transport with its headquarters in Frankfurt. ioki is an acronym for Input Output Künstliche Intelligenz (Input Output Artificial Intelligence).

ioki provides digital services for public transport such as a ridepooling platform, data-based transport planning and a navigation system for bus drivers. While the majority of services is currently still provided in the DACH region, the company's product and service offering is also growing in Italy, Spain, France and the United Kingdom. ioki's clients include cities, public transport companies, school districts, government entities and private organisations.

== History ==
ioki was founded in 2017 as a corporate startup of the Deutsche Bahn — Germany's main railway company — to focus on and drive forward autonomous public transport. Over the years, the product portfolio and services expanded and led to an integrated focus on digitalisation and accessibility.

In October 2017, the first autonomous bus line on public roads in Germany was launched in the Lower Bavarian spa town Bad Birnbach with ioki's operating system.

The company launched ioki Hamburg, one of the oldest and most successful demand-responsive transport services in Germany.

ioki collaborated with the Verkehrsbetriebe Hamburg Holstein (VHH) to create a shuttle that transports passengers around the clock in electric vehicles. It was later renamed hvv hop. The service started with ten vehicles and has grown since its launch. In 2019, ioki and Verkehrsbetriebe Hamburg (VHH) won the Deutscher Mobilitätspreis (German Mobility Award) for the ioki Hamburg project. Since then, various on-demand projects all over Europe have been set in motion.

In February 2024, ioki and the teledriving start-up Vay announced their partnership to realise the first remotely driven on-demand service in public transport.

== Activities ==
ioki is a software-as-a-service and technology company. The ridepooling and routing platform from ioki is suitable for both driver-based and autonomous transport. The platform is intended to create carpools and combine the booked trips into optimised routes. It consists of an administration tool for the operator, the vehicle app, and the customizable passenger app.

To optimise public transport, ioki uses data-based mobility analyses to identify the population's needs in the respective service area and enables assessment of the local mobility situation. The company recently added a navigation system that specialises in bus navigation and consists of a web version for route management and a navigation app for the driver. ioki is member of several organisations and networks to promote digital and autonomous mobility, such as SAAM (Swiss Association for Autonomous Mobility) and PAVE Europe. As of April 2024, the company reached 5 million passengers on the platform.
