= Babeli Giezendanner =

Swiss artist (1831–1905)

Anna Barbara Aemisegger-Giezendanner
- Born: 29 May 1831; Bendel, Ebnat-Kappel, Switzerland
- Died: 18 October 1905 (aged 74); Hemberg, Switzerland
- Known for: Painting
- Movement: Peasant painting (Bauernmalerei)
- Spouse: Ulrich Aemisegger (m. 1861)

Anna Barbara Aemisegger-Giezendanner (29 May 1831 – 18 October 1905), commonly known as Babeli Giezendanner, was a Swiss painter associated with Toggenburg and eastern Swiss Bauernmalerei, a tradition of rural folk painting. She was the first woman to produce a significant body of work in that tradition.

== Biography ==
Giezendanner was born in Bendel, in the municipality of Ebnat-Kappel, in 1831. Known as “s’Giezedanners Babeli”, she grew up as the third of nine children in poor circumstances. In 1861 she married Ulrich Aemisegger. She received her first instruction in writing and drawing from her father, and later worked in Lichtensteig for the lithographer Johann Georg Schmied.

Until her husband's death in 1873, Giezendanner painted only a little. After her marriage she had given up drawing and painting in order to work in agriculture. Afterwards, she helped support her family through handweaving, drawing views, and painting alpine pastoral scenes, farmhouses, villages, souvenir sheets, and album pictures. After selling the family property in 1876, she continued this work while leading a wandering life for many years in the Ebnat and Kappel area.

Between 1901 and 1904 she lived in Rheineck. She moved there to live with her brother Abraham Giezendanner-Künzler, who ran the Wirtschaft zur Toggenburg. In her final years she lived in the poorhouse at Hemberg. She was the first woman to produce a significant body of work in Toggenburg and eastern Swiss Bauernmalerei.

== Works ==
Giezendanner painted single houses, groups of houses, villages, alpine drives, cattle shows, and scenes from alpine dairying. She also made memorial sheets for births, baptisms, marriages, and deaths. For her Senntum paintings, links to Johannes Müller of Stein are documented, although her work differs from that of Appenzell painters. An inventory records nearly one hundred works, most of them watercoloured drawings.
