= Grand Council of Aargau =

Grand Council of Aargau Grosse Rat

Type
- Type: Unicameral legislature

Structure
- Seats: 140
- Political groups: SVP (48); SP (23); FDP (22); The Centre (18); GLP (11); Greens (10); EVP (5); EDU (3)

Elections
- Voting system: Party-list proportional representation Hagenbach-Bischoff system
- Last election: 2024
- Next election: 2028

Meeting place
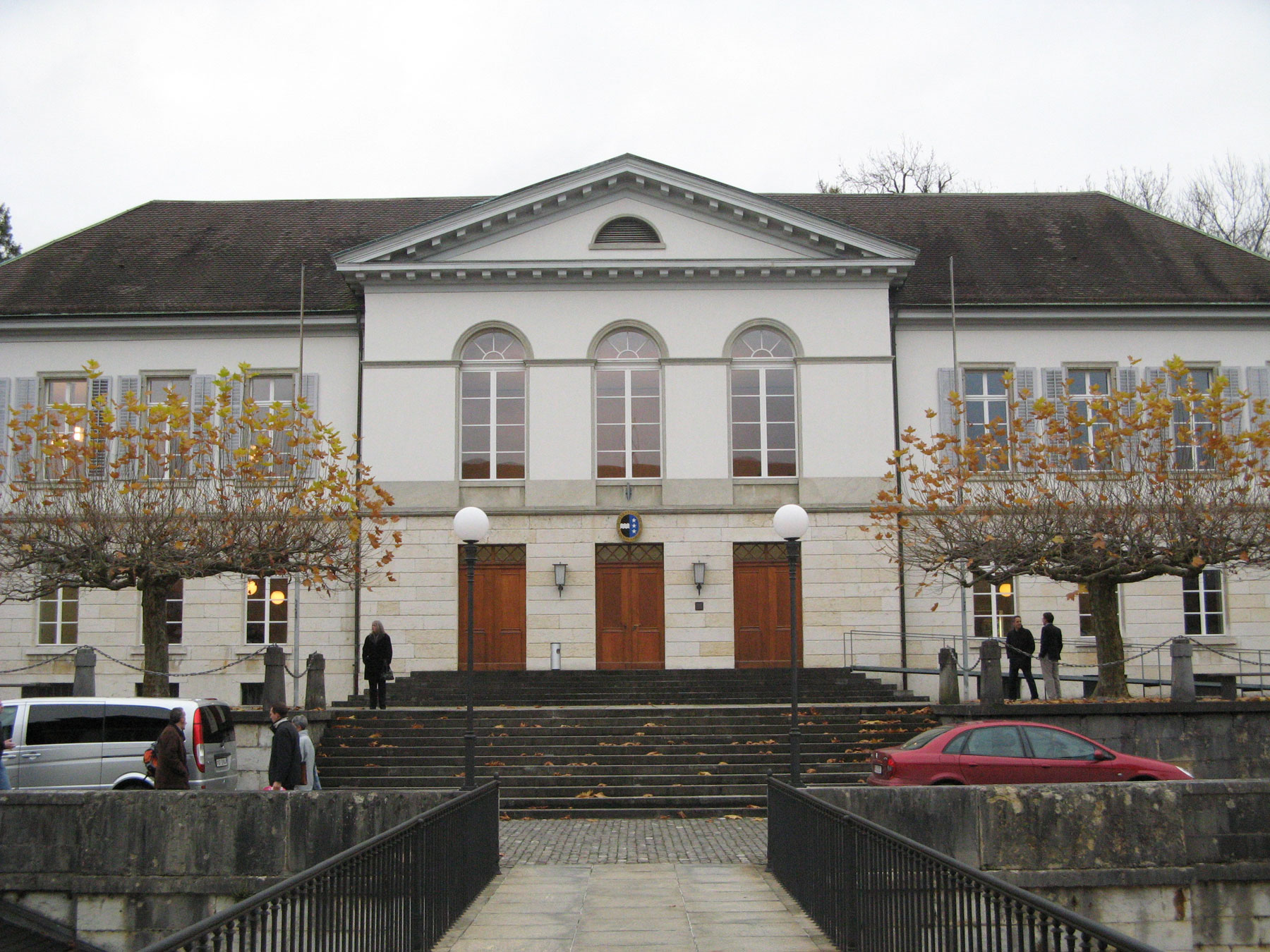
- Grossratsgebäude, Aarau

The Grand Council of Aargau (German: Grosser Rat) is the legislature of the canton of Aargau, in Switzerland. Aargau has a unicameral legislature. The Grand Council has 140 seats, with members elected every four years. The most recent election was in 2024.

== Parties ==
At the elections between 1997 and 2024 the parties won the following number of seats and votes:

Seats	2024	2020	2016	2012	2009	2005	2001	1997
SVP	48	43	45	45	45	46	72	47
FDP	22	21	22	22	20	24	40	40
SP	23	23	27	22	22	30	36	48
CVP	---	18	17	19	21	26	32	37
Die Mitte	18	---	---	---	---	---	---	---
Grüne	10	14	10	10	13	7	7	6
GLP	11	13	7	8	5	---	---	---
EVP	5	6	6	6	6	7	8	8
BDP	---	---	4	6	4	---	---	---
EDU	3	2	2	2	2	---	---	1
SD	---	---	---	---	2	---	4	7
FP	---	---	---	---	---	---	1	4
LdU	---	---	---	---	---	---	---	2
total	140	140	140	140	140	140	200	200

Votes	2024	2020	2016	2012	2009	2005	2001	1997
SVP	33,9%	30,3%	31,9%	32,0%	31,9%	30,3%	33,5%	21,9%
SP	16,1%	16,6%	18,9%	15,2%	15,7%	19,7%	18,6%	21,7%
FDP	15,4%	14,7%	16,0%	15,4%	14,3%	16,9%	19,0%	19,6%
Die Mitte	12,9%	---	---	---	---	---	---	---
CVP	---	12,8%	12,1%	13,3%	15,0%	17,5%	15,0%	17,3%
Grüne	7,4%	10,1%	7,1%	7,4%	8,9%	6,8%	4,0%	3,5%
GLP	8,2%	9,2%	5,3%	5,5%	3,5%	---	---	---
EVP	3,9%	4,2%	4,1%	3,9%	4,5%	5,7%	4,9%	4,3%
BDP	---	---	2,7%	4,4%	3,1%	---	---	---
EDU	1,8%	1,6%	1,8%	1,7%	1,8%	0,7%	1,0%	1,3%
SD	---	---	---	0,7%	1,2%	1,3%	1,8%	3,2%
LdU	---	---	---	---	---	---	1,4%	---

== Members ==
- List of members of the Grand Council of Aargau (2021–2024)
