= Corina Gredig =

Swiss politician

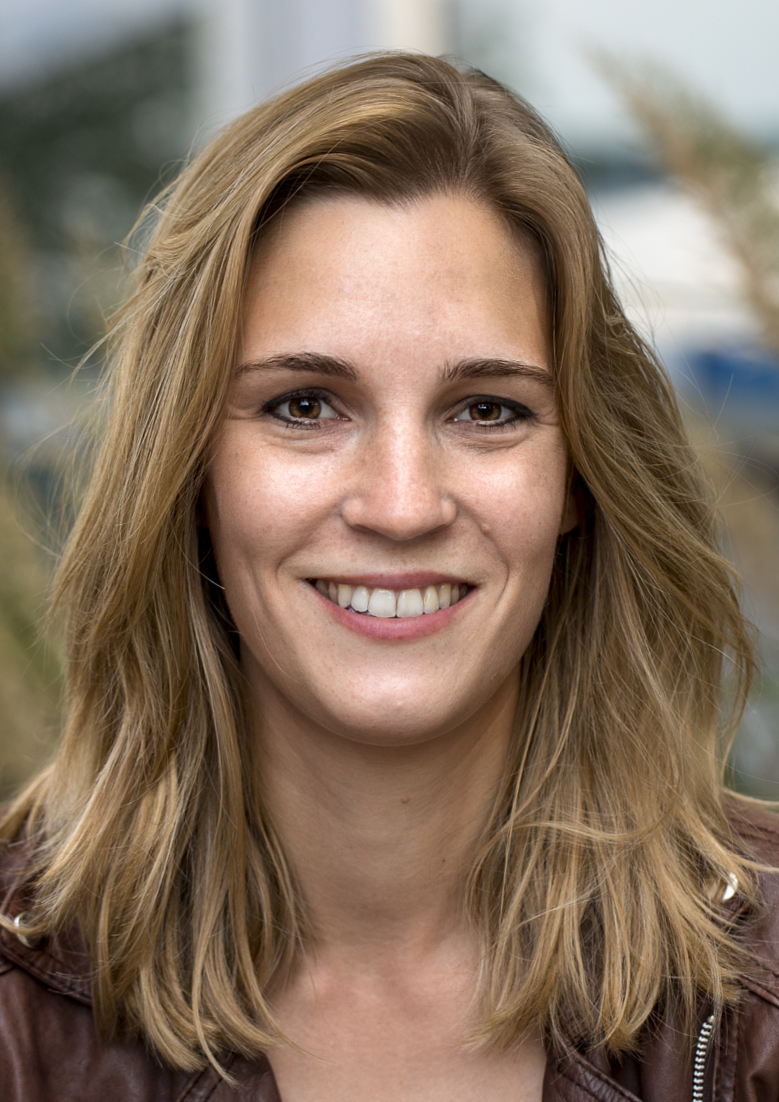
- Corina Gredig in 2018

Member of the National Council of Switzerland
- Incumbent
- Assumed office 2019

Personal details
- Born: 8 September 1987 (age 38)
- Party: Green Liberal Party

Corina Gredig (born 8 September 1987) is a Swiss politician from the Green Liberal Party of Switzerland. She has been a member of the National Council since 2019.

== Biography ==
Gredig grew up as the eldest of three children in the town of Binz (Maur) in the canton of Zurich. In 2003, she took part in the student protests against the Iraq War. She worked in various positions in the financial sector. In Lausanne, she completed the part-time university entrance qualification and studied political science, economics, and law in Zurich. She completed her studies with a master's thesis on "Digital Democracy". She is a partner in a consulting firm. She lives in the Riesbach district of the city of Zurich and has two children.

== Political career ==
Gredig headed the cantonal GLP secretariat from 2010 to 2013, led the cantonal and National Council election campaign in 2011 and became managing director of the Federal Parliament faction. In 2015, she founded and headed the Glp lab with National Council member Kathrin Bertschy. She is part of a group led by Bertschy and GLP President Jürg Grossen that is developing a contemporary, non-hierarchical organizational structure for the national party.

In 2018, she was elected to the Zurich City Council with a noticeably high number of panachage votes. On 20 November 2018, the general assembly unanimously elected Gredig, together with Nicola Forster, as co-president of the Zurich GLP cantonal party. The duo wanted to renew the party and appeal to younger and digitally savvy voter segments. In addition, there was the rejection of the left-right scheme, to which Gredig opposed the political front line between progressive and conservative forces. Forster and Gredig led the GLP to an election victory in the cantonal council elections in March 2019, and Gredig won a seat in the Cantonal Council of Zurich. The general meeting of the GLP Canton of Zurich adopted the list for the National Council elections on 25 June 2019 and placed Corina Gredig in third place behind the two previous members Tiana Angelina Moser and Martin Bäumle. On 20 October 2019, she was elected to the National Council, and then passed her seat in the Zurich cantonal council to Nathalie Aeschbacher. Gredig was confirmed as a member of the National Council in the 2023 elections. At the end of November 2023, she announced her resignation as co-president of the Zurich GLP, effective at the next general meeting. Since 11 December 2023, she has succeeded Tiana Angelina Moser as GLP parliamentary group president. In the National Council, Gredig serves on the Finance Committee and the State Policy Committee, previously on the Audit Committee (as of December 16, 2023).

== See also ==
- List of members of the National Council of Switzerland, 2019–2023
- List of members of the National Council of Switzerland (2023–2027)
