= 2019 Zürich cantonal elections =

- 24 March 2019

All 7 seats in the Executive Council of Zürich All 180 seats in the Cantonal Council of Zürich (91 seats needed for a majority)
- Executive Council
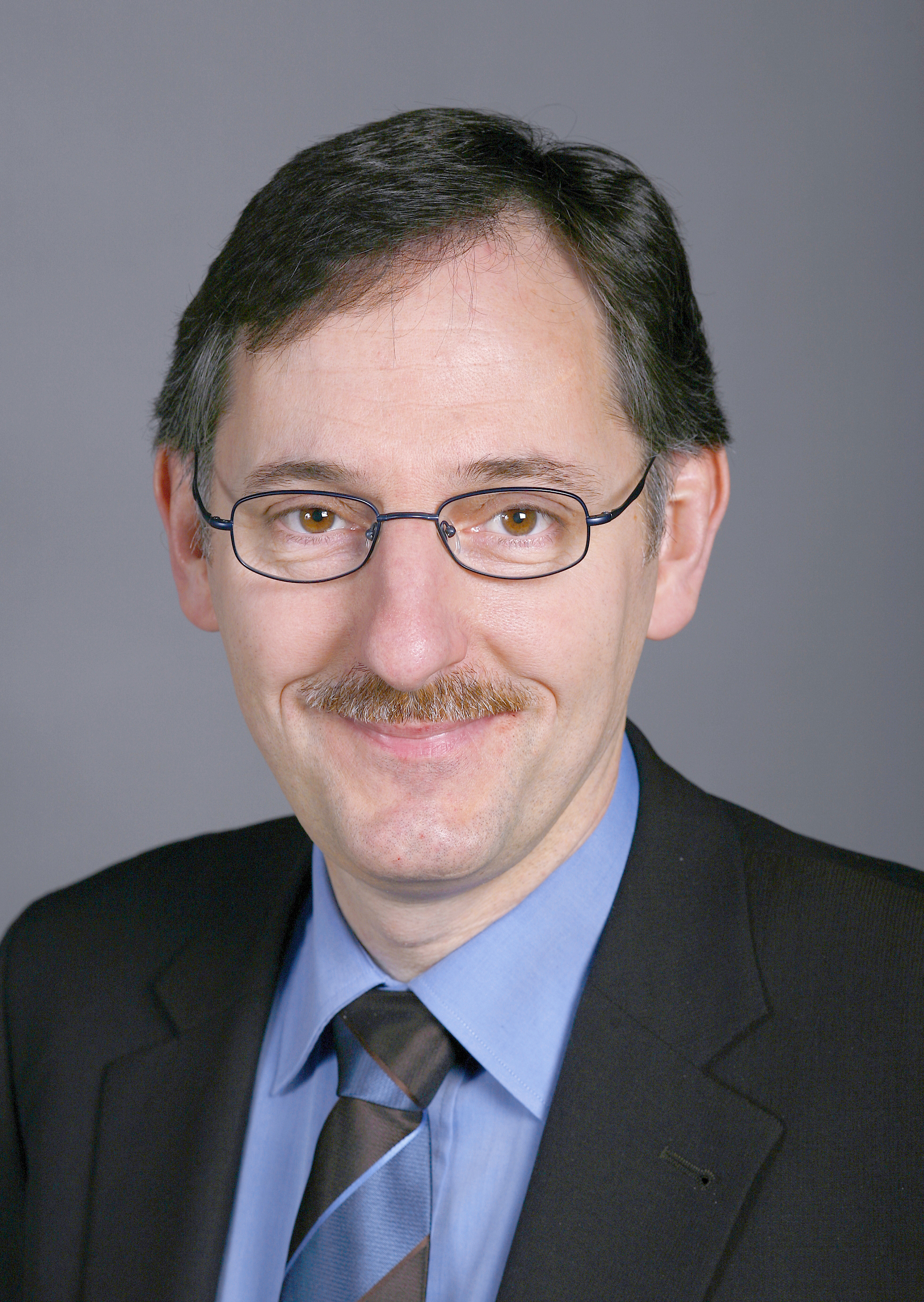

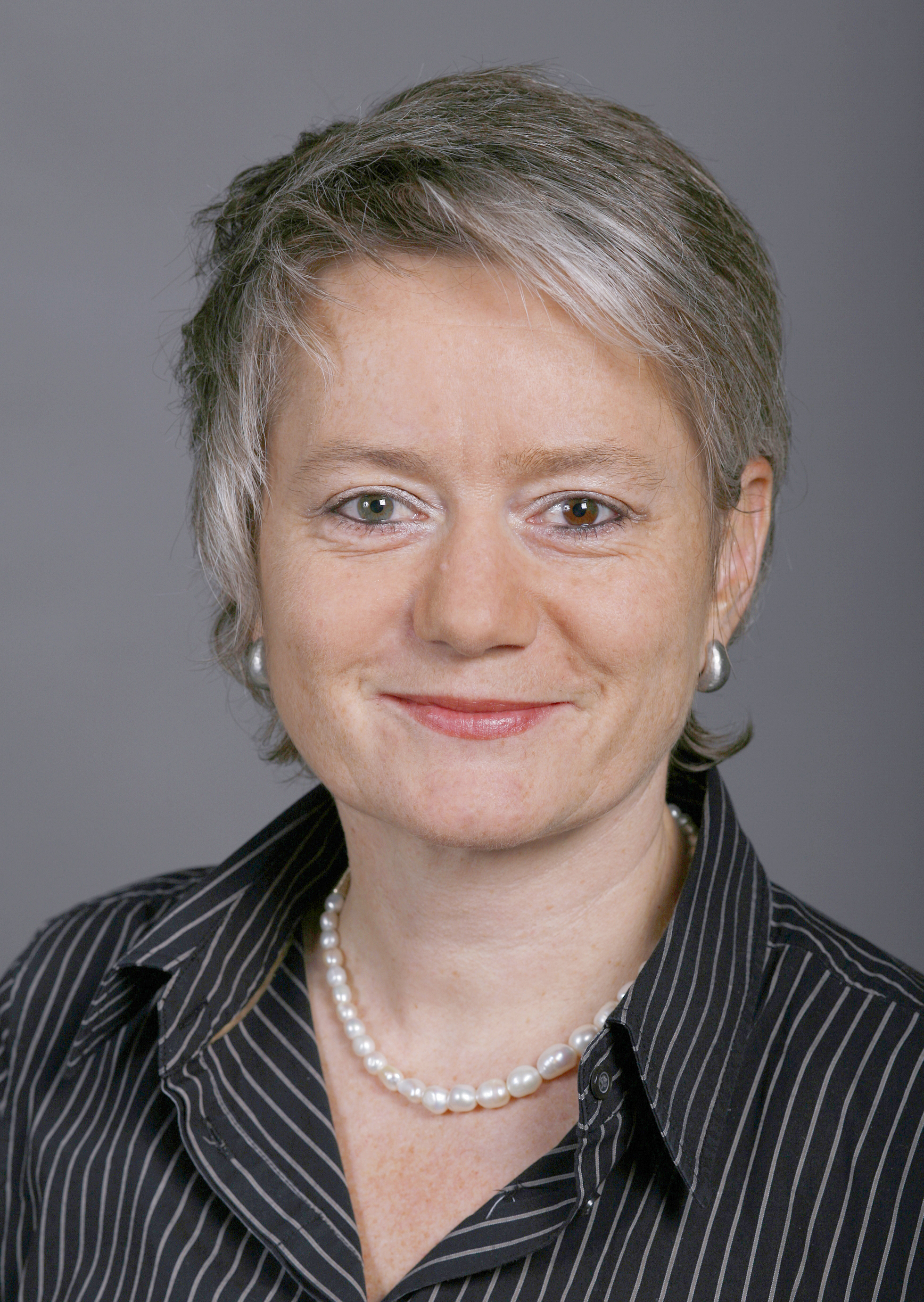

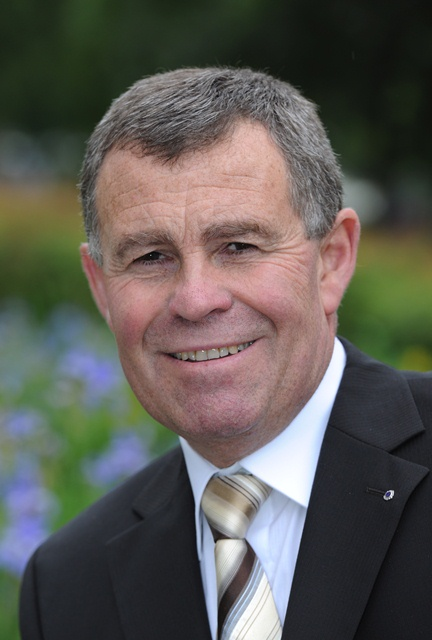

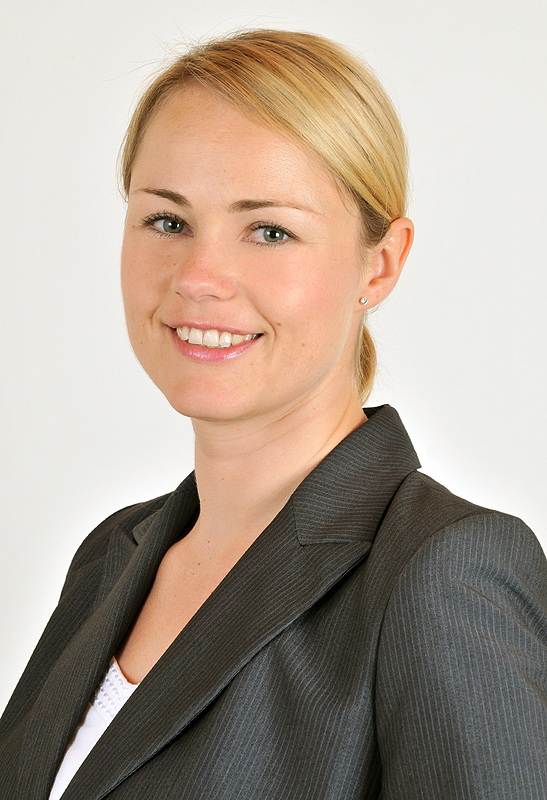

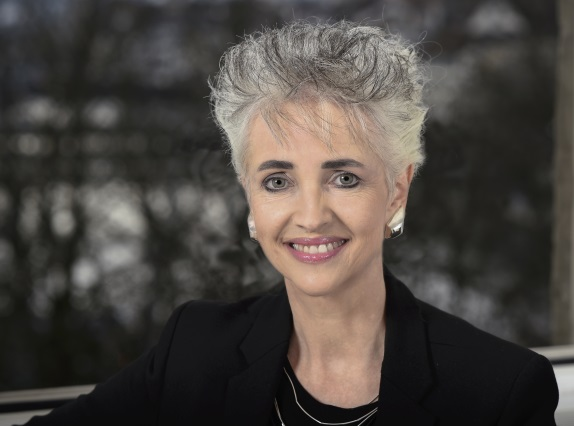

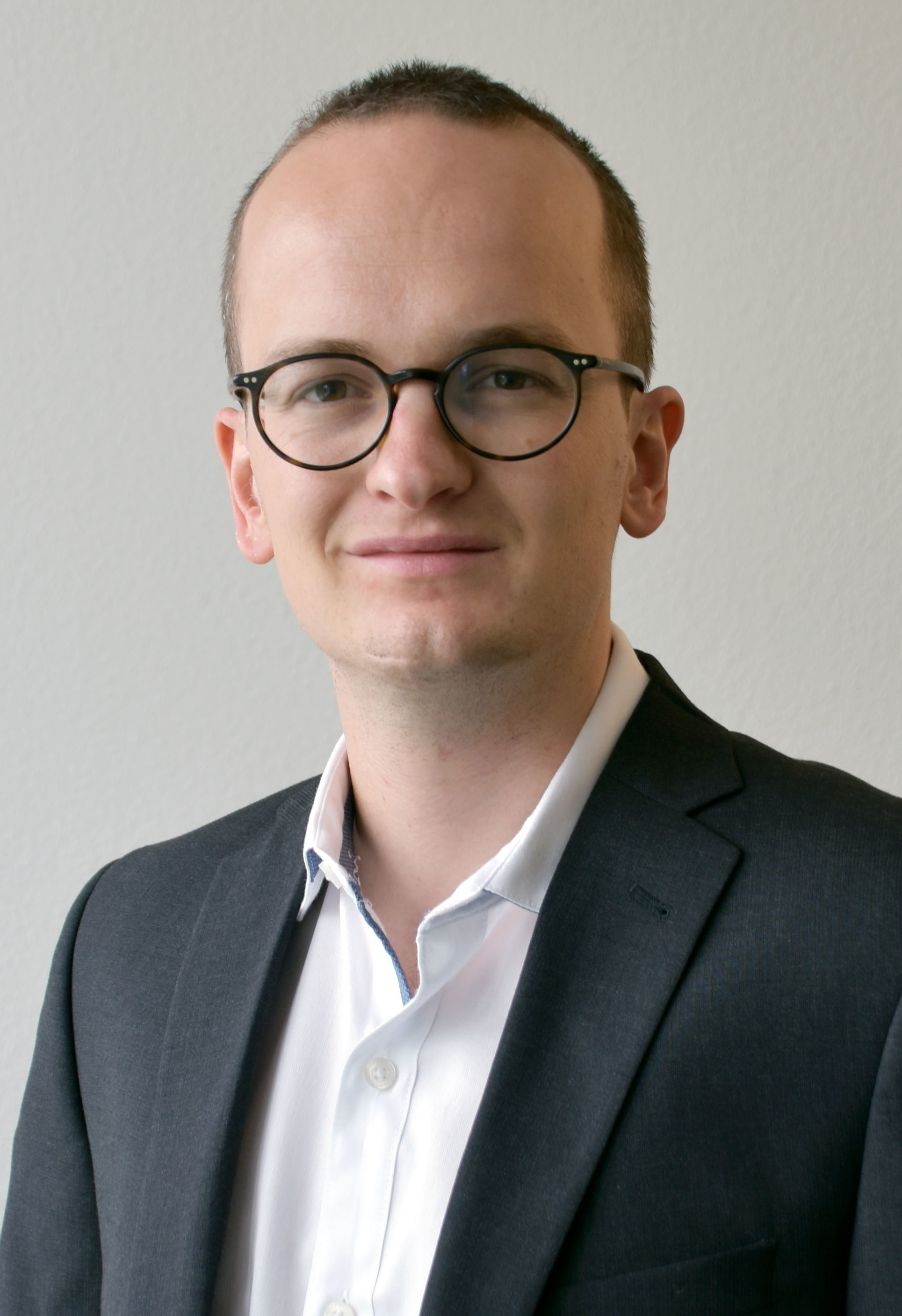
	First party	Second party
Party	Social Democrats	Swiss People's
Elected	Mario Fehr; 173,231, 83.80%	Ernst Stocker; 140,951, 68.19%
	Jacqueline Fehr; 149,104, 72.13%	Natalie Rickli; 116,096, 56.16%
	Third party	Fourth party	Fifth party
Party	Christian Democrats	FDP.The Liberals	Greens
Elected	Sylvia Steiner; 135,481, 65.54%	Carmen W. Späh; 126,229, 61.06%	Martin Neukom; 121,823, 58.93%
- Cantonal Council
Party	Vote %	Seats	+/–
Swiss People's	24.46%	45	−9
Social Democrats	19.31%	35	−1
FDP.The Liberals	15.66%	29	−2
Green Liberals	12.91%	23	+9
Greens	11.91%	22	+9
Christian Democrats	4.29%	8	−1
Evangelical People's	4.24%	8	0
Alternative List	3.15%	6	+1
Federal Democrats	2.27%	4	−1
This lists parties that won seats. See the complete results below.

The 2019 Zürich cantonal elections were held on 24 March 2019, to elect the seven members of the cantonal Executive Council and the 180 members of the Cantonal Council. All five incumbents running were re-elected to the Executive Council, as well as green candidate Martin Neukom and Swiss People's Party candidate Natalie Rickli.

The election was an upset for the left-wing and green parties. The Green Party re-gained an executive councilor as Neukom was elected and both social-democratic candidates topped the polls, although the right-of-center parties maintained a majority in the Executive Council. Both the Greens and Green-Liberals made important gains in the Cantonal Council, ending the right-of-center parties' overall majority.

== Electoral system ==
=== Executive Council ===
The Executive Council contains seven members elected using a two-round majoritarian system. In the first round, electors have up to seven votes and the seven most-voted candidates reaching an overall majority (>50%) are elected. If seats remain to be filled, a runoff is held where electors have as many votes as seats remaining, and the candidates with the most votes (simple plurality) are elected.

=== Cantonal Council ===
The Cantonal Council is elected using open-list proportional representation, with canton-wide apportionment of seats and allocation into 18 constituencies (biproportional apportionment). In each constituency, voters have as many votes as there are seats to fill (panachage is permitted); these votes each count both for the candidate and for the list they stand in. These votes counts are divided by the seats count to give fictional electors counts which can be summed up fairly throughout the canton.

Using the fictional electors counts, each party above the threshold (reaching 5% in at least one constituency) is apportioned seats canton-wide, which are then shared among their constituency lists. In each constituency list, the seats are attributed to the candidates reaching the most votes.

Number of seats by constituency
Constituency		Seats	Change
I	Zürich city districts 1 & 2	5	+1
II	Zürich city districts 3 & 9	12	=
III	Zürich city districts 4 & 5	5	=
IV	Zürich city districts 6 & 10	9	=
V	Zürich city districts 7 & 8	6	=
VI	Zürich city districts 11 & 12	12	=
VII	Dietikon	11	=
VIII	Affoltern	6	=
IX	Horgen	15	=
X	Meilen	12	−1
XI	Hinwil	11	−1
XII	Uster	16	=
XIII	Pfäffikon	7	=
XIV	Winterthur city	13	=
XV	Winterthur land	7	=
XVI	Andelfingen	4	=
XVII	Bülach	18	+1
XVIII	Dielsdorf	11	=

== Candidates ==
=== Executive Council ===
Five of the seven incumbents ran for re-election: Mario Fehr (SP), Ernst Stocker (SVP), Sylvia Steiner (DM), Carmen Walker Späh (FDP), and Jacqueline Fehr (SP).

Mario Fehr was narrowly re-nominated by his party but lost support from both the Greens and the Alternative Left. The Green Party aimed to re-gain their seat lost in 2015 and fielded cantonal councilor Martin Neukom; they recommended Alternative List candidate Walter Angst on their ticket instead of Fehr.

Incumbent councilor Thomas Heiniger (FDP) announced his retirement in early 2018, followed by Markus Kägi (SVP). The FDP selected cantonal council group leader Thomas Vogel, who had failed to be nominated against Carmen Walker Späh in 2015, to succeed Heiniger. The SVP chose national councilor Natalie Rickli to replace Kägi, by a wide margin in the internal vote after misogynist campaign emails from her opponent Christian Lucek were leaked to the media. The FDP, SVP, and CVP ran together informally again as the "Bourgeois Alliance for the Executive Council", highlighting their long-standing control of the cantonal executive, although with separate programs.

Jörg Mäder ran for the green-liberals, Hanspeter Hugentobler for the EVP, and Rosmarie Quadranti was the BDP candidate. The three "centrist" parties held a press conference together, with different programs but highlighting their ability to compromise; media speculated that they would unite behind a single candidate in the case of a runoff.

=== Cantonal Council ===
The table below lists contesting parties represented in the Cantonal Council before the election.

Name		Ideology	2015 result	
Name		Ideology	Votes (%)	Seats
SVP	Swiss People's Party; Schweizerische Volkspartei	National conservatism Right-wing populism	30.0%	54 / 180
SP	Social Democratic Party; Sozialdemokratische Partei	Social democracy Democratic socialism	19.7%	36 / 180
FDP	FDP.The Liberals; FDP.Die Liberalen	Classical liberalism Conservative liberalism	17.3%	31 / 180
GLP	Green Liberal Party; Grünliberale Partei	Green liberalism Social liberalism	7.6%	14 / 180
GPS	Green Party; Grüne Partei	Green politics Progressivism	7.2%	13 / 180
CVP	Christian Democratic People's Party; Christlichdemokratische Volkspartei	Christian democracy Social conservatism	4.9%	9 / 180
EVP	Evangelical People's Party; Evangelische Volkspartei	Christian democracy Social conservatism	4.3%	8 / 180
AL	Alternative List; Alternative Liste	Socialism	3.0%	5 / 180
EDU	Federal Democratic Union; Eidgenössisch-Demokratische Union	National conservatism	2.7%	5 / 180
BDP	Conservative Democratic Party; Bürgerlich-Demokratische Partei	Christian democracy Social conservatism	2.6%	5 / 180

The Party of Labour, Die Guten, and Helvida also contested this election. A total of 13 parties contested this election, as many as in 2015, representing a total of 1734 candidates.

During the previous legislature, the SVP and FDP formed a minority coalition to legislate, working with either the CVP, GLP, BDP, or EDU to pass legislation, but the GLP and EVP progressively distanced themselves from the alliance. The SP and Greens challenged several policies in referendums; as a result the bourgeois majority mainly worked on budgetary issues with few work on other policies, leading the SP to speak of a "lost legislature"

== Campaign ==
The "bourgeois alliance" of SVP, FDP, and CVP ran a joint campaign for the Executive Council. Similar alliances had already existed in the canton and city of Zürich in past elections. However, an SVP leaflet targeting the FDP two weeks before the election led to speculation about a potential division in the electorate.

Mario Fehr's renomination by the socialists was controversial especially to the Young Socialists due to his hardline stance on asylum policy; both the Greens and the Alternative left refused to endorse Fehr. These conflicts around Mario Fehr caused the leftist parties to enter this election disunited, which was seen as a risk for the greens despite Fehr's strong personal popularity.

Climate became a dominant campaign issue due to the ongoing climate strikes. Greens and Green-liberals were seen as most likely to gain from this focus, while the FDP did not gain from their own change-of-course in climate policy. Climate issues also overshadowed the SVP's core issues, immigration and asylum policy, leading them to expect further losses after a poor performance in the 2018 local elections. The socialists' ambiguous stance on the EU-Switzerland framework agreement and the resulting defection of former national councilor Chantal Galladé to the green-liberals also led them to lost momentum despite their successful results in the local elections.

== Opinion polls ==
=== Executive Council ===
Polling firm	Fieldwork date	Sample size	M. Fehr SP	Stocker SVP	Späh FDP	Steiner CVP	J. Fehr SP	Rickli SVP	Vogel FDP	Neukom GPS	Mäder glp	Quadranti BDP	Angst AL	Hugentobler EVP	Egli EDU
Sotomo	2 Mar 2019	?	65	54	54	52	49	44	42	38	30	24	19	10	6
Sotomo	19 Jan 2019	?	65.8	57.5	56.0	53.6	49.5	50.0	40.3	35.0	28.4	23.0	17.9	7.5	4.7

=== Cantonal Council ===
Polling firm	Fieldwork date	Sample size	SVP	SP	FDP	glp	GPS	CVP	EVP	AL	EDU	BDP	Others	Lead
Sotomo	2 Mar 2019	?	28.2	18.5	17.7	10.0	9.3	4.7	4.0	2.9	2.4	1.9	0.4	9.7
2015 election	12 Apr 2015	–	30.0	19.7	17.3	7.6	7.2	4.9	4.3	3.0	2.7	2.6	3.3	10.3

== Results ==
=== Executive Council ===
Note: percentages here are calculated based on the number of valid votes (excluding blank and invalid votes) so that the absolute majority is at exactly 50%, but may result in candidates reaching over 100% of the valid votes.

Results of the 2019 Zürich Executive Council election
Candidate	Party	Votes	%
Mario Fehr	SP	173,231	83.80
Jacqueline Fehr	SP	149,104	72.13
Ernst Stocker	SVP	140,951	68.19
Sylvia Steiner	CVP	135,481	65.54
Carmen Walker Späh	FDP	126,229	61.06
Martin Neukom	Grüne	121,823	58.93
Natalie Rickli	SVP	116,096	56.16
Thomas Vogel	FDP	109,624	53.03
Jörg Mäder	GLP	93,782	45.37
Walter Angst	AL	81,754	39.55
Rosmarie Quadranti	BDP	52,677	25.48
Hanspeter Hugentobler	EVP	41,860	20.25
Hans Egli	EDU	23,702	11.47
Jan Linhart	Ind.	7,265	3.51
Scattered votes		73,417	35.52
Total		1,272,428	64.09
Blank and invalid votes		713,080	35.91
Total votes		1,985,508	7×
Valid ballots		283,644	97.40
Invalid ballots		7,572	2.60
Total ballots		291,216	–
Registered voters/Turnout		910,776	31.97

This election was an upset for the left-of-center parties. The two social-democratic candidates topped the polls with Mario Fehr exceeding 83%, and Martin Neukom was elected after unexpectedly placing sixth. Both SVP candidates dropped below 70% for the first time since 2007, white the FDP scored historically low and lost one of their two seats for the first time as Thomas Vogel failed to make the top-7. Sylvia Steiner placed fourth as her vote share remained constant; four other candidates finished above 20%.

As 8 candidates reached a majority, no runoff was held. The top-5 alliance lost one of their seats but retained a majority with four councilors out of seven, although with the CVP needed compared to the previous elections.

=== Results by district ===
Vote share of each candidate by district
District	Angst AL	Egli EDU	J. Fehr SP	M. Fehr SP	Huge. EVP	Linh. Ind.	Mäder GLP	Neuk. GPS	Quad. BDP	Rick. SVP	Späh FDP	Stei. CVP	Stoc. SVP	Vogel FDP	Scattered
Affoltern	32.3	13.1	71.1	83.2	19.8	3.2	44.2	54.4	24.3	60.0	63.1	68.8	74.5	53.7	34.3
Andelfingen	24.8	14.9	64.1	79.6	19.5	2.4	39.3	49.0	26.7	74.5	63.4	66.0	85.9	55.2	34.9
Bülach	28.0	17.0	62.4	79.5	21.1	2.4	44.1	45.1	24.4	67.1	65.3	69.9	77.8	56.2	39.8
Dielsdorf	19.7	27.4	54.2	72.4	20.0	2.0	41.2	41.1	24.9	75.0	68.4	72.9	85.3	59.8	35.8
Dietikon	27.6	9.9	58.8	78.9	15.9	2.0	40.7	45.9	21.3	68.4	69.5	78.2	79.5	61.3	42.2
Hinwil	28.7	18.1	62	77	27.2	2.6	38.8	48.5	27.8	66.4	64.5	65.7	78.1	55.8	38.9
Horgen	29.9	9.7	61.9	82.9	22.3	1.9	42.8	51.1	21.2	61.1	65.5	73.0	81.3	59.5	35.9
Meilen	24.3	9.4	57.0	81.5	16.4	2.6	43.5	45.7	21.4	64.3	74.7	75.3	80.3	69.2	34.3
Pfäffikon	23.1	16.7	61.5	77.8	37.0	2.8	40.1	47.4	27.9	66.0	61.9	65.0	75.8	60.6	36.3
Uster	31.7	11.0	68.1	81.1	19.8	2.9	46.4	52.6	33.1	58.5	63.7	66.3	70.1	55.1	39.6
Winterthur	40.5	10.6	78.4	86.0	24.1	3.6	45.1	64.9	24.4	55.4	55.2	60.9	63.5	47.2	40.2
Zürich	66.7	5.8	92.3	92.1	15.2	5.9	51.8	80.7	26.5	36.2	51.7	56.8	47.4	42.1	29.0
Total	39.5	11.5	72.1	83.8	20.3	3.5	45.4	58.9	25.5	56.2	61.1	65.5	68.2	53.0	35.5

=== Cantonal Council ===
Results of the 2019 Zürich Cantonal Council election
Graph of the party split among 180 seats.
Party	Votes	%	+/–	Seats	+/–
Swiss People's Party	74,563	24.46	−5.56	45	−9
Social Democratic Party	58,870	19.31	−0.36	35	−1
FDP.The Liberals	47,747	15.66	−1.66	29	−2
Green Liberal Party	39,342	12.91	+5.27	23	+9
Green Party	36,309	11.91	+4.69	22	+9
Christian Democratic People's Party	13,086	4.29	−0.59	8	−1
Evangelical People's Party	12,928	4.24	−0.03	8	±0
Alternative List	9,593	3.15	+0.17	6	+1
Federal Democratic Union	6,926	2.27	−0.36	4	−1
Conservative Democratic Party	4,655	1.53	−1.09	0	−5
Labour Party	530	0.17	New	0	New
Die Guten	260	0.09	New	0	New
Helvida	12	0.00	New	0	New
Total	304,821	100.00	–	180	–
Valid votes	304,818	99.81			
Invalid/blank votes	566	0.19			
Total votes	305,384	100.00			
Registered voters/turnout	910,776	33.53			
Source: wahlen.zh.ch

This election continued the realignment in Swiss politics, as the Green-Liberals and Greens together gained ten points and 18 seats. This was even more than predicted in the polls, and would later be described as a "green wave".

The SVP dropped to their lowest level since 1995, and the BDP lost all their seats due to missing the threshold. This election was a debacle for the bourgeois parties: the FDP, SVP, and CVP together lost 12 seats in total and their incumbent overall majority.

As a result of this election, the right-of-center parties totaled 86 seats and the social democrats and greens added up to 57 seats; the Tages-Anzeiger described the green-liberals and their 23 seats as kingmakers in the newly-elected cantonal council.

=== Results by constituency ===
Number of seats and share of votes for each party by constituency
Constituency	SVP	SP	FDP	GLP	GPS	CVP	EVP	AL	EDU	Total seats	SVP	SP	FDP	GLP	GPS	CVP	EVP	AL	EDU	BDP	PdA
I Zürich City 1 & 2	1	1	1	1	1	0	0	0	0	5	13.1	25.3	17.1	13.7	18.2	4.0	1.4	5.6	0.5	–	0.5
II Zürich City 3 & 9	2	3	1	1	2	1	0	2	0	12	14.2	29.8	10.0	12.1	17.2	4.2	2.4	8.1	0.2	0.4	0.7
III Zürich City 4 & 5	0	2	0	1	1	0	0	1	0	5	6.6	31.6	8.3	14.7	17.9	1.4	0.8	15.7	0.3	–	1.3
IV Zürich City 6 & 10	1	3	1	1	2	0	0	1	0	9	11.6	28.4	14.2	14.0	16.7	2.7	1.9	8.1	0.3	0.8	0.5
V Zürich City 7 & 8	1	1	2	1	1	0	0	0	0	6	12.4	22.4	23.7	14.4	14.9	4.6	2.1	4.2	0.3	–	0.4
VI Zürich City 11 & 12	2	3	1	2	2	1	0	1	0	12	19.2	27.1	11.0	12.7	13.9	4.2	4.0	4.5	1.1	1.0	0.6
VII Dietikon	4	2	2	1	1	1	0	0	0	11	29.4	18.7	17.4	12.5	6.2	8.2	3.3	1.4	1.3	1.6	–
XIII Affoltern	1	1	1	1	1	0	1	0	0	6	26.6	17.8	15.1	14.2	10.8	2.8	8.6	0.9	2.3	0.9	–
IX Horgen	4	3	3	2	1	1	1	0	0	15	24.1	16.6	21.2	11.7	10.1	7.4	4.5	1.4	1.4	1.6	–
X Meilen	3	2	3	2	1	1	0	0	0	12	27.0	14.2	25.3	13.3	9.2	4.4	2.5	1.1	1.9	1.1	–
XI Hinwil	3	1	2	1	1	1	1	0	1	11	30.3	12.8	13.4	10.0	12.1	5.8	5.7	1.5	6.2	2.1	–
XII Uster	4	3	2	2	2	1	1	0	1	16	26.8	17.0	14.9	15.0	10.5	4.9	3.4	1.6	2.4	3.4	–
XIII Pfäffikon	2	1	1	1	1	0	1	0	0	7	31.1	13.9	13.9	11.4	9.5	2.7	9.4	1.2	4.8	2.0	–
XIV Winterthur City	2	3	2	2	2	0	1	1	0	13	18.8	24.1	10.7	14.5	15.1	3.8	5.5	4.0	1.8	1.6	–
XV Winterthur Land	2	1	1	1	1	0	1	0	0	7	35.1	11.6	14.2	13.9	9.4	3.0	8.0	0.6	2.7	1.4	–
XVI Andelfingen	2	1	1	0	0	0	0	0	0	4	37.0	14.3	15.8	8.6	9.8	1.6	4.5	1.0	2.7	4.7	–
XVII Bülach	6	3	3	2	1	1	1	0	1	18	31.8	15.8	15.9	12.2	8.2	3.5	5.1	1.3	3.8	2.2	–
XVIII Dielsdorf	5	1	2	1	1	0	0	0	1	11	39.5	13.0	13.0	11.6	8.8	3.6	2.7	0.8	5.2	1.7	–
Total	45	35	29	23	22	8	8	6	4	180	24.5	19.3	15.7	12.9	11.9	4.3	4.2	3.2	2.3	1.5	0.2

== Aftermath ==
As in 2015, this election was a bellwether for the federal election in October, as the Green and Green-Liberal gains would as expected be replicated on a federal scale.

=== Cantonal departments ===
Attribution of the departments of the Cantonal administration of Zürich for 2019
Department	Head before	Head after
Department of Justice and Home Affairs	Jacqueline Fehr	
Department of Finance	Ernst Stocker	
Department of Health	Thomas Heiniger	Natalie Rickli
Building Department	Markus Kägi	Martin Neukom
Department of Security	Mario Fehr	
Department for Economic Affairs	Carmen Walker Späh	
Department of Education	Silvia Steiner	
