= Glp lab =

Swiss-based think tank

The glp lab is a think tank of the Green Liberal Party of Switzerland. Corina Liebi has been its president since 2022.

== Structure and organisation ==
The lab was established in 2016 by National Council member and co-president of the cantonal party Corina Gredig as director, and National Council member Kathrin Bertschy as president and patron. The think tank maintains ties to Operation Libero, the foreign policy think tank Foraus – Forum Aussenpolitik, and the Austrian NEOS Lab, which is tied to the liberal NEOS party.

Politically, the glp lab aims to "promote progressive liberal ideas" and offer an entry point for interested parties who do not want to enter politics through the traditional long and arduous process. Interested parties gather suggestions in so-called "Ideenküchen" (idea kitchens), which are then analysed by experts in a second round in order to be incorporated into politics as input, reports, or parliamentary initiatives.

== Topics ==
The think tank deals with topics such as the living and working conditions of the future, a new intergenerational contract, transparency in political financing and a modern liberal drug policy. In 2018, the glp lab gained attention with the publication of a proposal in the dispute between the Swiss Federal Council and trade unions over measures concerning the free movement of persons with the EU.
