= Sanija Ameti =

Bosnian born Swiss politician

Member of the Zurich Municipal Council
- Incumbent
- Assumed office May 2022

Personal details
- Born: May 11, 1992
- Other political affiliations: Operation Libero (co-president since 2021)
- Education: University of Zurich (Law)
- Occupation: Politician, activist, cybersecurity expert

Sanija Ameti (born 11 May 1992) is a Swiss politician, activist and cybersecurity expert. She has been co-president of the political movement Operation Libero since 2021 and has been a member of the Zurich municipal council since 2022.

== Early life and education ==
Sanija Ameti was born on 11 May 1992 into a Bosniak Muslim family. Her father was a professor of biology and a politician during Yugoslavia. In 1995, she came to Switzerland as a refugee. The family initially wanted to go to Germany, but the smuggler at the border demanded more money than they had, leaving the Ameti family in Kreuzlingen. Ameti then went to the asylum center in Adliswil. She grew up in Oerlikon, where she completed high school. She initially wanted to study art history, but her father preferred that she become either a lawyer or a doctor. Subsequently, Ameti studied law at the University of Zurich from 2011 to 2018 and has been pursuing a doctorate at the University of Bern on the topic of cybersecurity.

== Career ==
=== GLP membership and election to Operation Libero co-presidency ===
Sanija Ameti became politically active after meeting the first female Federal Councillor of Switzerland, Elisabeth Kopp, who encouraged her to pursue a political career.

Since 2019, she has been a member of the executive board of the Young Green Liberals of Switzerland and became a member of the party leadership of the Green Liberal Party of Switzerland in Canton Zurich in 2020. In early 2020, Ameti was tasked with leading the counter-campaign against the anti-terrorism legislation.

In early October 2021, Ameti took over the co-presidency of the political movement Operation Libero from Laura Zimmermann. According to L'Illustre, the organization's leadership noticed her growing public profile and offered her the position. She leads the movement together with Stefan Manser-Egli. Ameti has advocated for a closer relationship between Switzerland and the European Union, and has advanced a popular initiative to restart negotiations between the two, which had been interrupted in 2021.

Sanija Ameti has advocated for a legal framework for active measures in the digital space. Since May 2022, Ameti has served as a member of the municipal council of Zurich, representing the districts 4 and 5. In 2023, she ran unsuccessfully for the Zurich Cantonal Council. She also ran for the National Council as a GLP candidate in 2023, but was not elected.

=== Mary and Baby Jesus controversy and leaving the GLP ===
In September 2024, Ameti posted photos on Instagram that showed her using an auction house catalog poster of a Mary and Baby Jesus painting as a shooting target. The act caused widespread condemnation. Ameti apologised and announced her resignation from the leadership of the Zurich GLP on 9 September. On the same day, the GLP Switzerland announced that it would initiate expulsion proceedings. The Swiss Bishops' Conference condemned her "unacceptable behavior" and announced that Ameti had asked the "Catholic community for forgiveness." Farner Group, a consulting firm where she worked, terminated her employment. Ameti was placed under police protection after receiving multiple death and rape threats. As of 10 October, multiple instances of legal action have been started against her by various parties, including a complaint that she committed the offense under Article 261 of the Swiss Criminal Code, which punishes the malicious disturbance of religious beliefs and religious practices, and the dishonouring of locations and objects of worship.

The leader of the Zurich municipal council GLP faction stated that there was no intention to remove Ameti from the council, acknowledging her apology. Instead of her being quickly expelled from the party, the local GLP branch stated that the issue would be discussed at a meeting that includes Ameti, scheduled for the next week. The Swiss Catholic Women's Association stated that Christians should forgive, and condemned sexist, Islamophobic, and xenophobic attacks on Ameti.

On 2 November 2024, the board of the Eastern Switzerland chapter of Operation Libero resigned, after their ultimatum that Ameti be removed from the position of co-president failed.

In an interview later in 2024, Ameti apologized again, adding that around the time of the practice shooting and her posting the photo of the perforated poster on Instagram, which was late in the evening, she was not cognizant of the religious significance of the image on the poster because she was overworked and underslept from working the previous nights; that she did not choose that particular page for a reason, and that it could have been any random page from the catalog; that she had taken the catalog from a heap of scrap paper in the basement; that she was feeling emotionally disturbed due to sudden thoughts of her brother being shot and killed (which, according to her, happened prior to her family's emigration to Switzerland); that she was feeling alone in her psychological pain and felt the urge to post something on social media, while not being able to think clearly; that she had previously lost the sense of the boundary between her private life and digital life on social media; and that, influenced by these factors, she impulsively posted something she otherwise would not have, only realizing what she did after waking up, and that she felt ashamed. She also stated that the gaffe should not be understood as another of her political stunts, all of which were intended to convey some political idea, whereas the Instagram post causing the controversy was not underpinned by any political message she wanted to make.

In 21 January 2025, facing potential expulsion, Ameti left the GLP. On 28 January 2026, Ameti was fined CHF3,500 over the shooting, after a court found her guilty of "violating freedom of religion and belief". The verdict has sparked debate over the so-called "Blasphemy Article".
