= Bertschy =

Bertschy is a Swiss surname. Notable people with the surname include:

- Christoph Bertschy (born 1994), Swiss ice hockey player
- Kathrin Bertschy (born 1979), Swiss economist and politician
- Paul Max Bertschy (1840–1911), Baltic German architect

== See also ==
- Bertschy House, a house in Bentonville, Arkansas, US
