= Patrick Hässig =

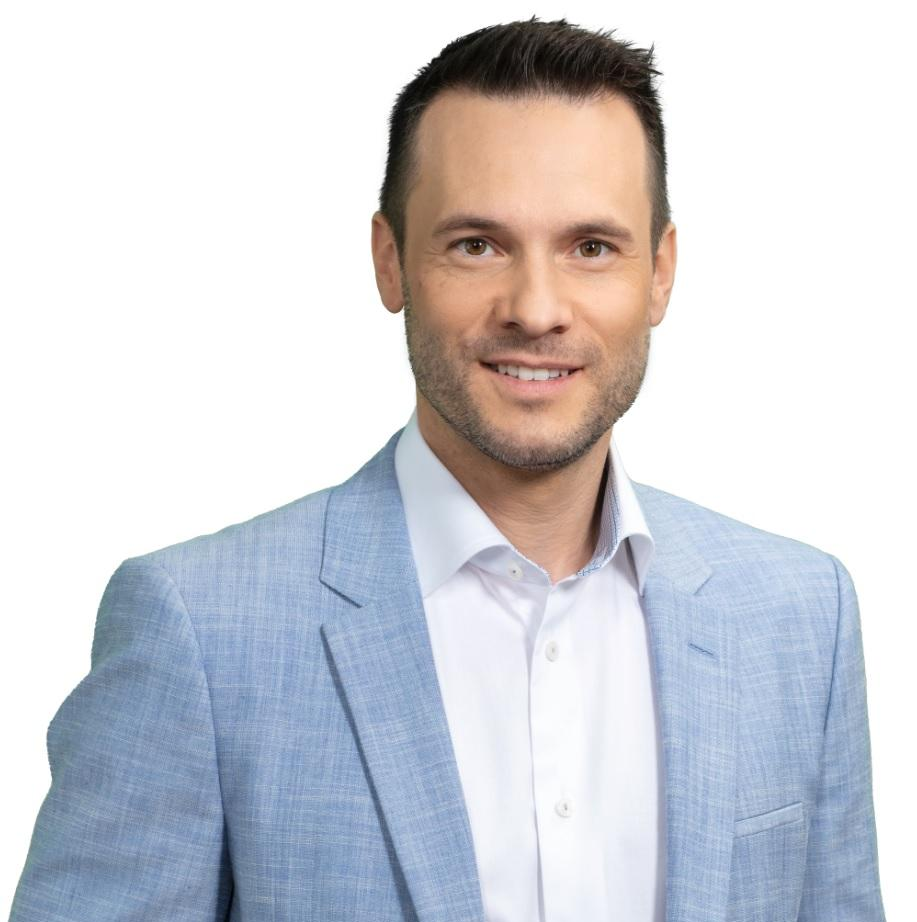
- Official portrait, 2023

Member of National Council (Switzerland)
- Incumbent
- Assumed office 4 December 2023
- Preceded by: Tiana Angelina Moser
- Constituency: Canton of Zurich

Member of Cantonal Council of Zürich
- In office 8 May 2022 – 24 November 2023
- Succeeded by: Beat Hauser

Personal details
- Born: Patrick Michel Hässig; 1 February 1979 (age 47) Zürich, Switzerland
- Party: Green Liberal Party
- Occupation: Politician, health professional, radio personality
- Website: Official website Parliament website

Military service
- Allegiance: Switzerland
- Branch/service: Swiss Armed Forces
- Rank: Wachtmeister

Patrick Michel Hässig (German pronunciation: [ˈpatʁɪk ˈhɛsɪç]; born 1 February 1979) is a Swiss politician, health professional and former radio personality. He currently serves as a member of the National Council (Switzerland) for the Green Liberal Party since 2023 succeeding Tiana Angelina Moser.
