= Martin Haab =

Swiss politician (born 1962)

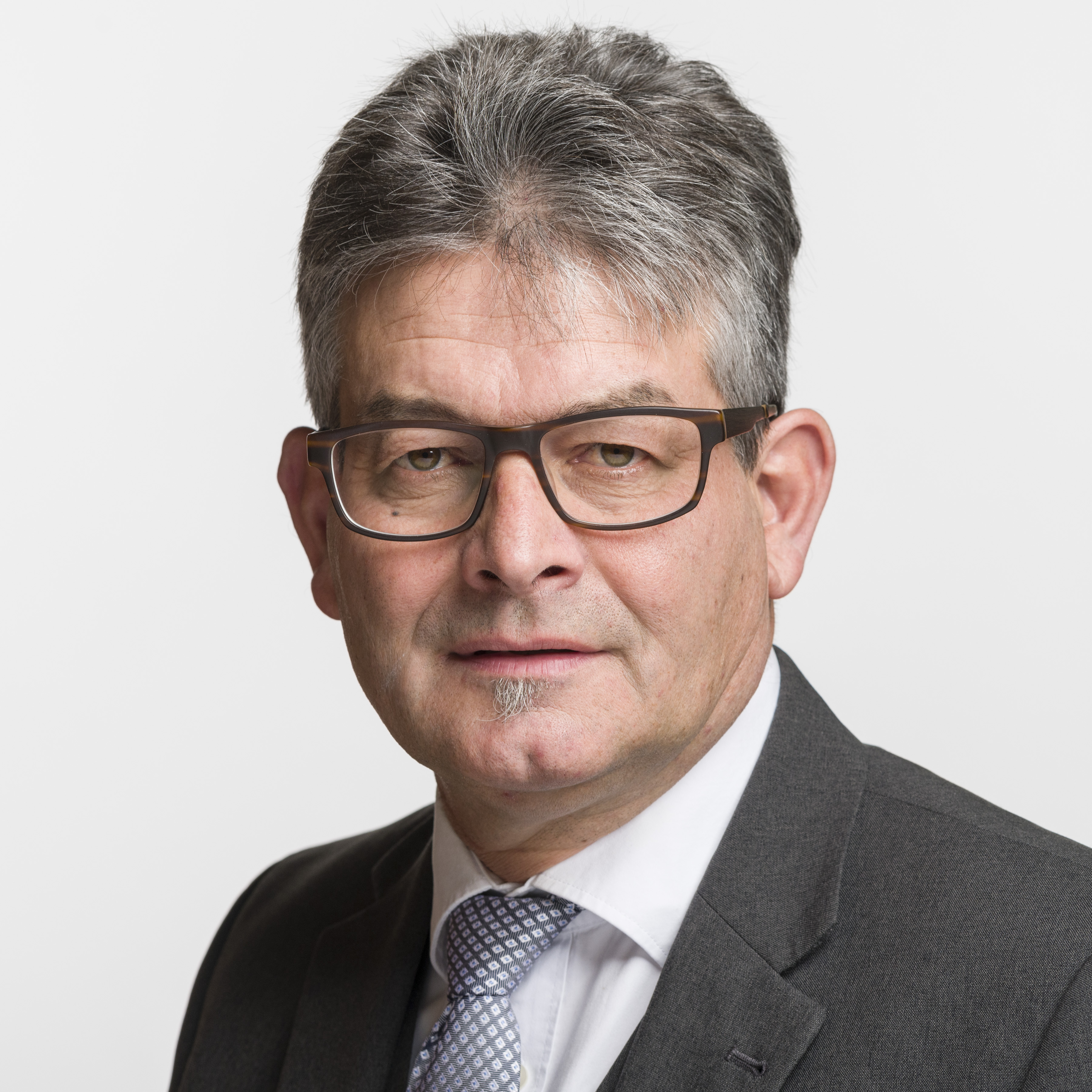
- Martin Haab (2019)

Member of the National Council (Switzerland)
- Incumbent
- Assumed office 3 June 2019
- Preceded by: Natalie Rickli

Personal details
- Born: Martin Haab; 3 May 1962 (age 64) Mettmenstetten, Zürich, Switzerland
- Party: Swiss People's Party
- Website: martinhaab.ch (in German)

Military service
- Branch/service: Swiss Armed Forces
- Rank: Soldier

Martin Haab (/hæhb/; born 3 May 1962) is a Swiss farmer and politician. He currently serves as a member of the National Council (Switzerland) since 2019. Haab previously served on the Cantonal Council of Zürich between 2011 and 2019. He currently is the president of the Zürich Farmers Association (ZBV).

== Politics ==
Haab was a member of the Cantonal Council of Zürich between 2011 and 2019. In the 2019 Swiss federal election, he was elected into the National Council (Switzerland) succeeding Nathalie Rickli. He assumed office on 3 June 2019. In 2022, after it became public that Ueli Maurer would resign, Haab expressed his interest in Federal Council (Switzerland), but he did not seek official nomination.
