= Katja Christ =

Swiss lawyer and politician

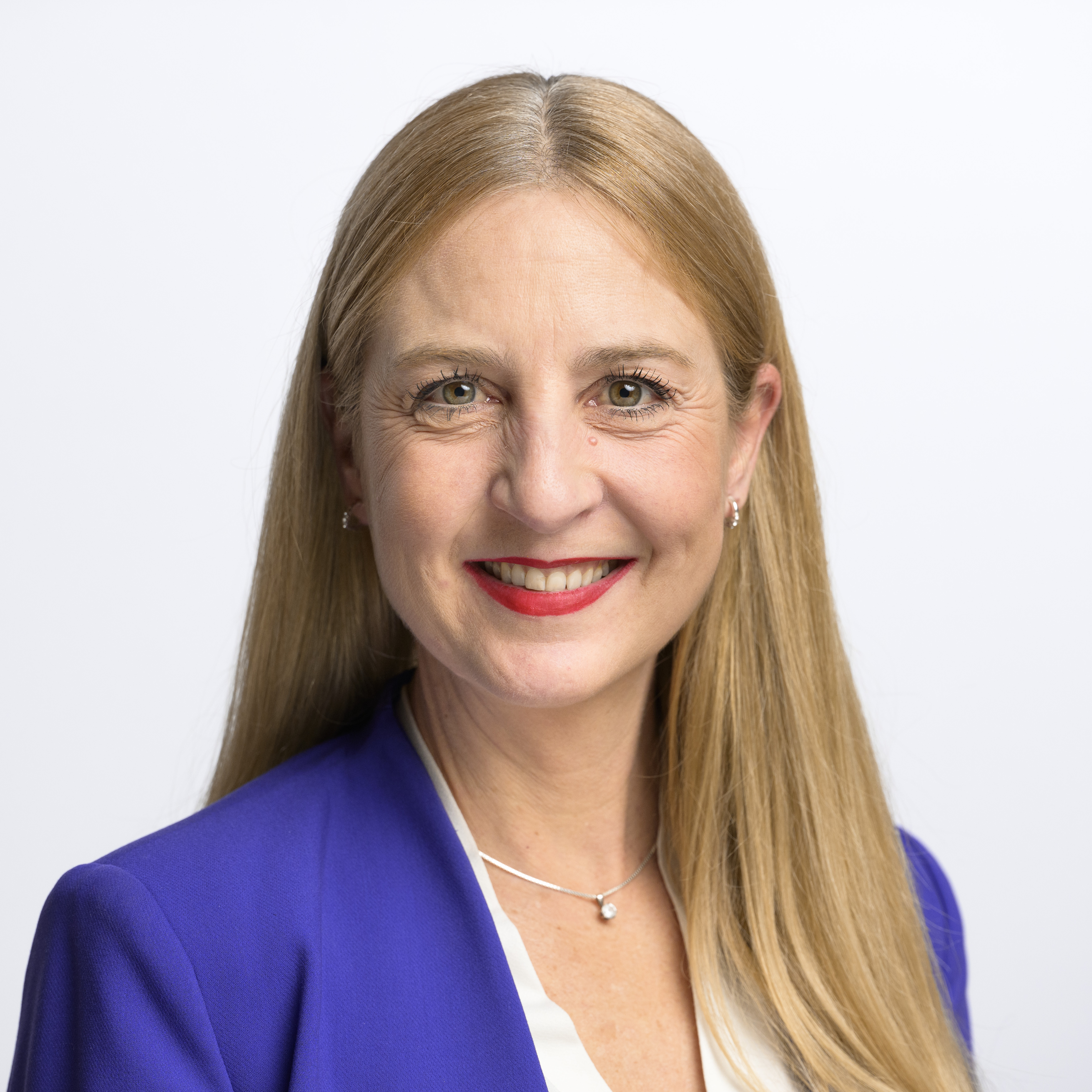

Member of the National Council
- Incumbent
- Assumed office 2019

Personal details
- Born: 1 August 1972 (age 53) Basel
- Party: GLP

Katja Christ (born 1 August 1972 Basel) is a Swiss lawyer and politician. She was elected to the Swiss National Council on the ticket of Green Liberal Party (GLP) in 2019.

== Education and career ==
Christ was raised in Oberwil and studied Law at the University of Basel. After being called to bar, she was employed in the health department of the Canton Basel -Stadt and later worked in the Riehen municipal administration for several years before joining Balex Advokatur & Notariat law firm.

== Political career ==
Christ became an active politician in 2012 when she joined Green Liberal Party. Between 2014 and 2020, she was a member of the Grand Council of Basel representing the GLP. She became GLP president in Basel-Stadt and a national board member of the party in 2016. Between 2018 and 2019, she served as a member of the residents’ council of the municipality of Riehen and was elected to the council’s committees on Audit, Family and Education. She was elected to the National Council on 20 October 2019 and was inaugurated to the council on 2 December same year. At the council, she serves on the Audit and Transportation and Telecommunication committees. On 15 December 2019, she resigned from her positions in the Residents’ Council and the greater Council as sittings in both councils are held same time with National Council making it impossible to attend all sittings.
