= Melanie Mettler =

Swiss politician (born 1977)

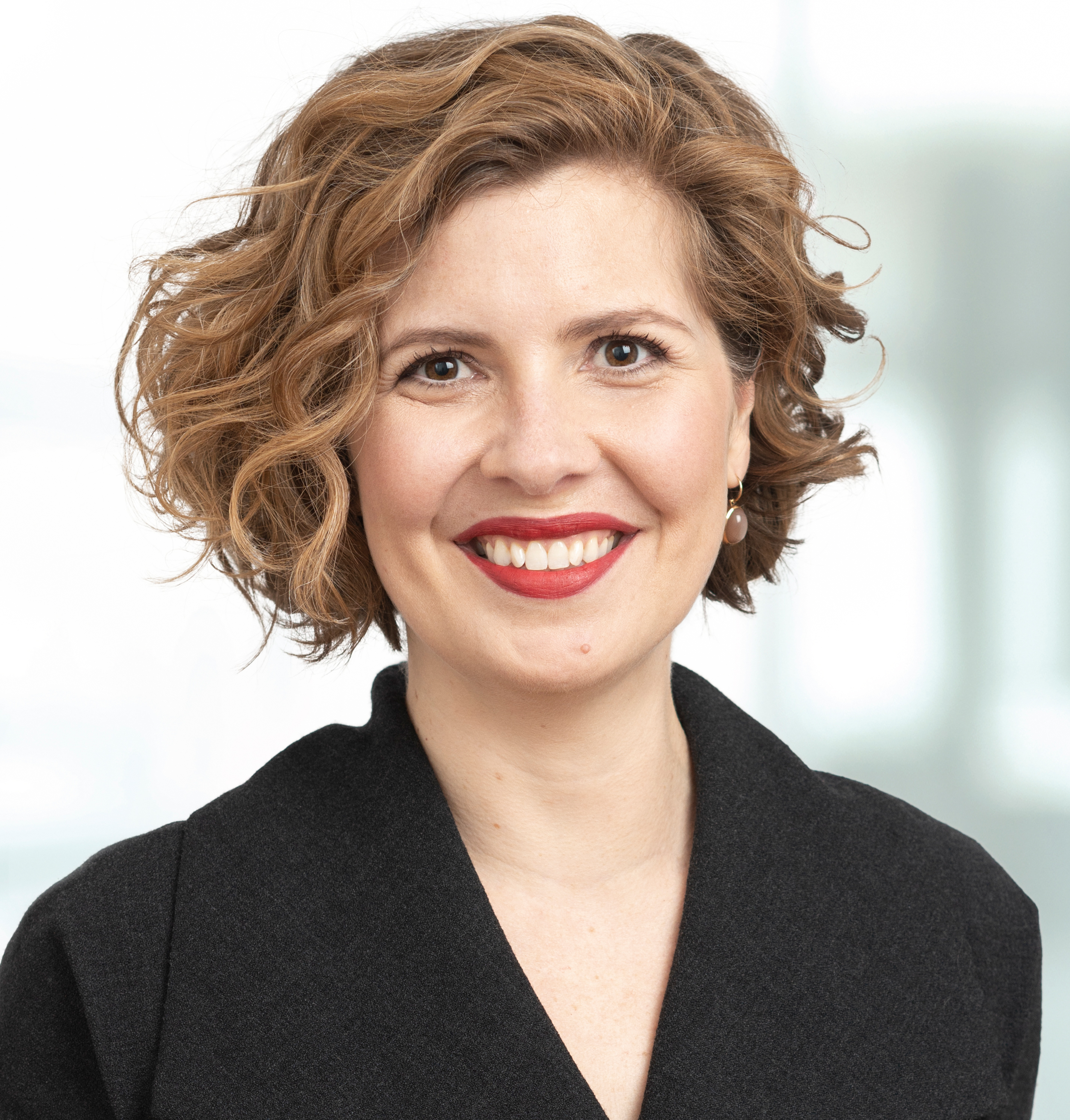

Member of the National Council of Switzerland
- In office 2019–2025

Personal details
- Born: Melanie Nicole Mettler; 3 December 1977 (age 48) Bern, Switzerland
- Party: Green Liberal Party

Melanie Nicole Mettler (born 3 December 1977) is a Swiss politician from the Green Liberal Party of Switzerland (GLP). From 2019 to 2025 she was a member of the National Council. Since 2021 she has been Vice President of the GLP Switzerland. In 2024 she was elected to the Bern City Council and since the beginning of 2025 has headed the Directorate for Finance, Personnel and Information Technology (FPI).

== Education and early career ==
Melanie Mettler studied literary studies, analytical philosophy, and linguistics, and subsequently received her doctorate in English studies with a cultural studies investigation into cosmopolitan values in literature.

Professionally, she is co-director of an information portal for employers on professional integration. For seven years, she was a lecturer and consultant at the World Trade Institute, an interdisciplinary research and training institute at the University of Bern in the field of global trade regulation. As a social innovation consultant, she co-founded the Social Innovation Bern Accelerator (SIBA) platform and is currently its co-president. he is also a co-founder of the crowdfunding project Sunraising, which finances community solar power systems in Bernese neighbourhoods. She is co-president of the Bernese cultural center Dampfzentrale and a board member of the non-partisan association Neue Helvetische Gesellschaft.

== Political career ==
Melanie Mettler's first political office was as a junior faculty representative in the Faculty of Humanities and Social Sciences at the University of Bern from 2010 to 2013. From 1 January 2013, she was a member of the Bern City Council (city parliament), where she held various parliamentary positions: among other things, she was a member of the Agglomeration Commission from 10 January 2013 to 13 January 2016, and served as its president from 16 January 2014 to 14 January 2015. From 14 January 2016 to 20 September 2017, she was a member of the Planning, Transport and Urban Green Spaces Commission. From 2013 to 2019, she chaired the Green Liberal and Young Green Liberal faction in the Bern City Council (together with Peter Amman until the end of 2016). Her political priorities are urban development, transport, and the energy transition. In 2016, she was re-elected to the Bern City Council, and also unsuccessfully ran for a seat on the Bern Municipal Council (Executive). Melanie Mettler was elected to the National Council in the 2019 Swiss federal election. She served on the Social Security and Health Committee throughout her term; she was also a member of the Security Policy Committee from 2021 to 2023. At the delegates' meeting of the Green Liberal Party of Switzerland on 6 February 2021, she was elected its vice-president, also took a seat on the executive committee. She was re-elected in the 2023 elections.

On 24 November 2024, Melanie Mettler was elected to the Municipal Council of Bern. Since 1 January 2025, she has headed the Directorate for Finance, Personnel and Information Technology of the City of Bern. As of 3 March 2025, she announced her resignation from the National Council. Fabienne Stämpfli succeeded her.

== Personal life ==
Melanie Mettler lives in the city of Bern.

== See also ==
- List of members of the National Council of Switzerland, 2023–2027
- List of members of the National Council of Switzerland, 2019–2023
