= Barbara Schaffner =

Swiss politician

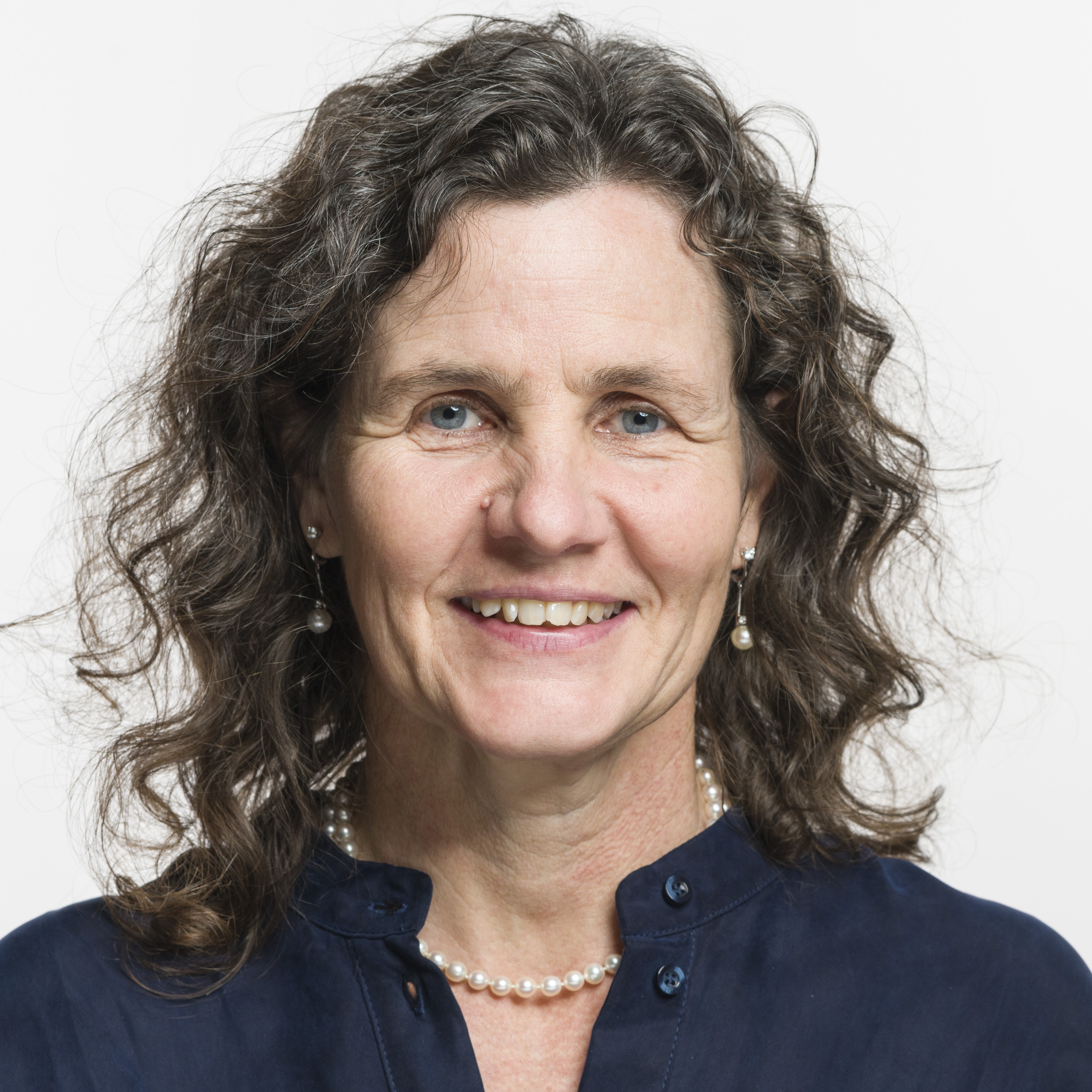
- Barbara Schaffner in 2019

Member of the National Council of Switzerland
- Incumbent
- Assumed office 2011

Personal details
- Born: 28 July 1968 (age 58) Zurich, Switzerland
- Party: Green Liberal Party
- Education: ETH Zürich

Barbara Schaffner (born 28 July 1968) is a Swiss politician, energy expert, and physicist. She is a member of the National Council for the Green Liberal Party for the canton of Zurich and mayor of Otelfingen.

== Biography ==
Barbara Schaffner grew up in Anglikon in the canton of Aargau. In 1988 she lived as an exchange student on a farm in Wyoming, USA. After studying physics and receiving a doctorate in medical physics at ETH Zürich and the PPaul Scherrer Institute, she completed a postdoc at the National Institute of Radiological Sciences in Chiba, Japan. From 2000 to 2008 she worked at Varian Medical Systems as a specialist in proton therapy and researched algorithms in radiotherapy At ETH, Schaffner furthered her education, obtaining a Master of Energy Science and Technology, worked as a project manager for solar power plants and, as an energy expert, is the managing director of her company eneba GmbH. As managing director and board member, she heads the non-partisan networking group Zurich Renewable: Association for Energy Efficiency and Renewable Energies. Furthermore, as a member of the board of the Mühle Otelfingen Foundation, she is committed to preserving the historic building and using it for cultural events. She has two children with her long-term partner, Paul Eggimann.

== Political career ==
Schaffner was elected to the Cantonal Council of Zurich for the Dielsdorf district in 2011. She was a member of the Committee for Transport, Energy and the Environment. From 2011 to 2013, she was also a member of the Committee for Planning and Construction. In the Cantonal Council, she campaigned primarily for renewable energies and public transport. She also attracted attention with a successful initiative against the disappearance of native crayfish species.

In July 2018, the voters of Otelfingen elected Schaffner as mayor. In 2019, she was one of the driving forces with the committee "No to the harmful water law" that defeated the new water law in the canton of Zurich in a referendum, arguing primarily with environmental and flood protection as well as the additional bureaucratic burden for municipalities. In the GLP, she heads the national energy working group and is president of the GLP Unteres Furttal. In the parliamentary elections on 20 October 2019, Schaffner was elected to the National Council for the Green Liberals. She therefore resigned from the Cantonal Council in November 2019. In the National Council, she is (as of August 2024) in the Committees for Transport and Telecommunications of the Federal Council, in the Delegation for Relations with the Parliament of the Principality of Liechtenstein and deputy in the Parliamentary IT Group (PIT).

== Publications ==
- Barbara Schaffner (1997), Range precision of therapeutic proton beams (Doctoral Thesis), ETH Zürich, doi:10.3929/ethz-a-001891967, hdl:20.500.11850/143426
- W. Ulmer, B. Schaffner (2011), "Foundation of an analytical proton beamlet model for inclusion in a general proton dose calculation system", Radiation Physics and Chemistry, vol. 80, no. 3, pp. 378–389, arXiv:1009.0832, Bibcode:2011RaPC...80..378U, doi:10.1016/j.radphyschem.2010.10.006
- Barbara Schaffner (2008), "Proton dose calculation based on in-air fluence measurements", Physics in Medicine and Biology, vol. 53, no. 6, pp. 1545–1562, Bibcode:2008PMB....53.1545S, doi:10.1088/0031-9155/53/6/003, PMID 18367787
- S. N. Boon, P. van Luijk, T. Böhringer, A. Coray, A. Lomax, E. Pedroni, B. Schaffner, J. M. Schippers (2000), "Performance of a fluorescent screen and CCD camera as a two-dimensional dosimetry system for dynamic treatment techniques", Medical Physics, vol. 27, no. 10, pp. 2198–2208, Bibcode:2000MedPh..27.2198B, doi:10.1118/1.1289372, PMID 11099186
- Barbara Schaffner, Tatsuaki Kanai, Yasuyuki Futami, Munefumi Shimbo, Eriko Urakabe (2000), "Ridge filter design and optimization for the broad-beam three-dimensional irradiation system for heavy-ion radiotherapy", Medical Physics, vol. 27, no. 4, pp. 716–724, Bibcode:2000MedPh..27..716S, doi:10.1118/1.598934, PMID 10798694
- B. Schaffner, U. Schneider, R. Pescia (1999), "3D-Verifikation der 5-Felder-Bestrahlung des Mammakarzinoms mit Filmdosimetrie", Zeitschrift für Medizinische Physik, vol. 9, no. 2, pp. 106–112, doi:10.1016/S0939-3889(15)70209-6
- Barbara Schaffner, Eros Pedroni, Antony Lomax (1999), "Dose calculation models for proton treatment planning using a dynamic beam delivery system: an attempt to include density heterogeneity effects in the analytical dose calculation", Physics in Medicine and Biology, vol. 44, no. 1, pp. 27–41, Bibcode:1999PMB....44...27S, doi:10.1088/0031-9155/44/1/004, PMID 10071873
- Eros Pedroni, Terence Böhringer, Adolf Coray, Emmanuel Egger, Martin Grossmann, Shixiong Lin, Antony Lomax, Gudrun Goitein, Werner Roser, Barbara Schaffner (1999), "Initial experience of using an active beam delivery technique at PSI", Strahlentherapie und Onkologie, vol. 175, no. S2, pp. 18–20, doi:10.1007/bf03038879, PMID 10394388
- Uwe Schneider, Barbara Schaffner, Tony Lomax, Eros Pedroni, Alexander Tourovsky (1998), "A technique for calculating range spectra of charged particle beams distal to thick inhomogeneities", Medical Physics, vol. 25, no. 4, pp. 457–463, Bibcode:1998MedPh..25..457S, doi:10.1118/1.598220, PMID 9571611
- B. Schaffner, E. Pedroni (1998), "The precision of proton range calculations in proton radiotherapy treatment planning: experimental verification of the relation between CT-HU and proton stopping power", Physics in Medicine and Biology, vol. 43, no. 6, pp. 1579–1592, Bibcode:1998PMB....43.1579S, doi:10.1088/0031-9155/43/6/016, PMID 9651027
