= Christian Democrats/EVP/glp Group =

Swiss parliamentary group (2007–2011)

The Christian Democrats/EVP/glp Group (German: Fraktion CVP/EVP/glp, French: Groupe PDC-PEV-PVL, Italian: PPD-PEV-glp), abbreviated to CEg, was a centrist parliamentary group of three parties in Switzerland's federal legislature, the Federal Assembly, between 2007 and 2011.

It was formed by the Christian Democratic People's Party (CVP), Evangelical People's Party (EVP), and Green Liberal Party (glp). The Group was the second-largest grouping in the Federal Assembly overall, with a total of 52 members: 36 in the National Council and 16 in the Council of States.

Two of the parties, the CVP and EVP, are Christian democratic, holding socially conservative, but centrist economic views. They also hold environmentalist positions, under the theological principle of stewardship. The CVP has historically been a Roman Catholic party, whilst the EVP is a Protestant party. The third party, the Green Liberals, was formed as a centrist alternative to the left-wing Green Party, and adheres to green liberalism: environmentalism combined with socially liberal and economically centrist policies. In the political spectrum, the Group falls between the Social Democrats to the left and FDP.The Liberals and the Swiss People's Party to the right.

It was led by President Urs Schwaller, who sits in the Council of States for the CVP.

In 2011, following the Swiss federal election, 2011, the CEg was disbanded, the Green Liberals formed their own faction (GL) and Christian parties formed the Christian-Evangelical Group (CE).
