= Fabienne Stämpfli =

Swiss politician

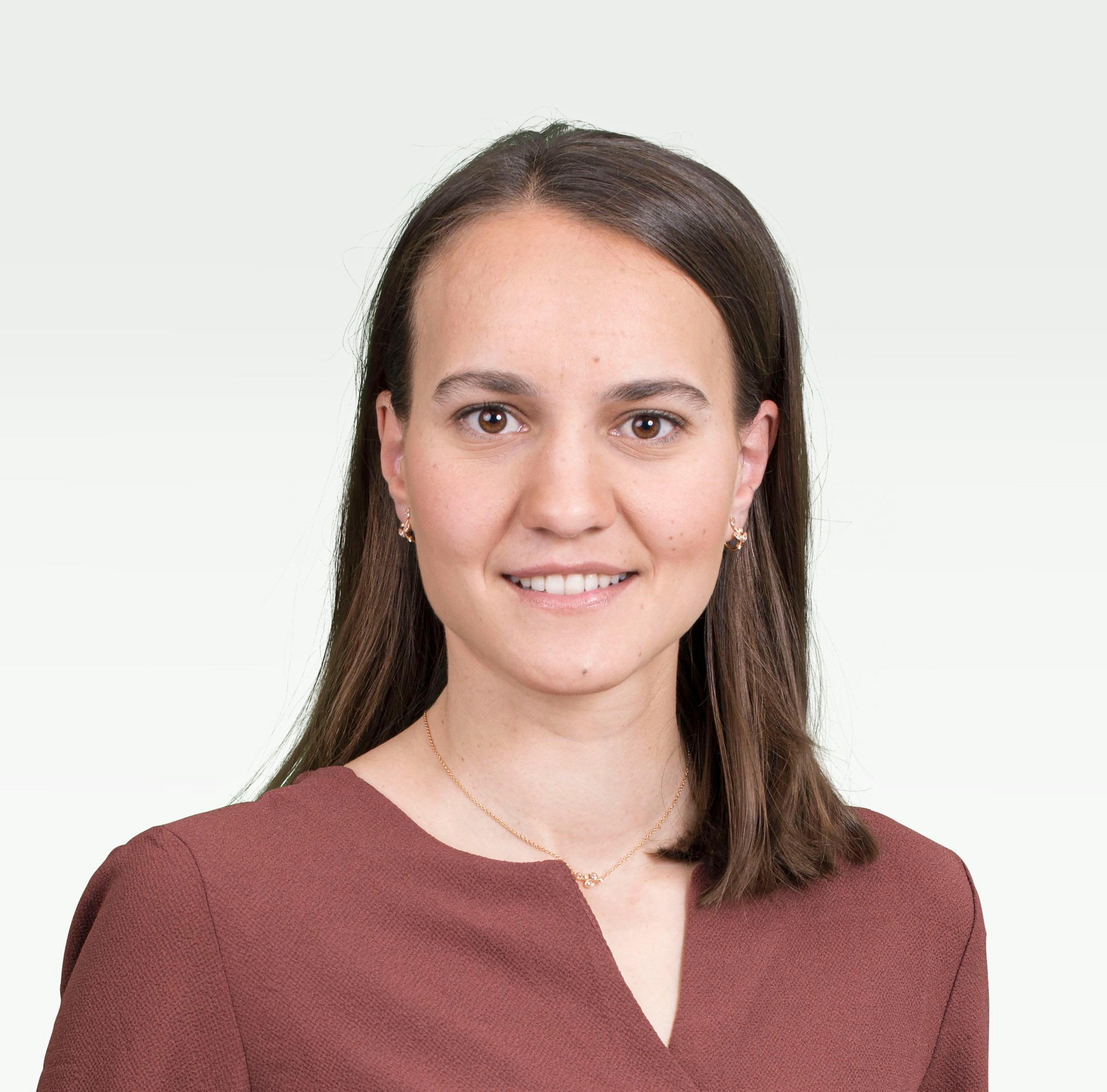

Member of the National Council of Switzerland
- Incumbent
- Assumed office March 2025
- Preceded by: Melanie Mettler

Personal details
- Born: 13 March 1992 (age 34) Thun, Switzerland
- Party: Green Liberal Party
- Education: ETH Zurich

Fabienne Stämpfli (born 13 March 1992) is a Swiss politician from the Green Liberal Party (GLP). She has been a member of the National Council for the Canton of Bern since March 2025.

== Early life and education ==
Fabienne Stämpfli was born on 13 March 1992. She grew up in Thun (Gwatt) and has lived in Oberhofen am Thunersee since 2021. After school, she completed an apprenticeship as a pharmacy assistant, including a vocational baccalaureate, and then passed the university entrance examination. She subsequently studied environmental engineering at ETH Zurich and graduated with a Master of Science (MSc ETH). She works as a department head in the field of hydraulic engineering, environment, and natural hazards.

== Political career ==
Stämpfli is a member of the Green Liberal Party (GLP). She is vice-president of the GLP Oberhofen and also represents the GLP Canton Bern on its executive committee and the GLP Switzerland board.

In the 2023 Swiss federal election, Stämpfli ran for the National Council on the Green Liberal Party (GLP) party list for the Canton of Bern. She was first on the substitute list. In March 2025, she moved up to replace Melanie Mettler, along with Ueli Schmezer (who had moved up to replace Matthias Aebischer), who had been elected to the Bern city government and took office at the beginning of 2025.

In the National Council, she is a member of the Committee for Science, Education and Culture (WBK) and the Business Audit Committee (GPK).

== See also ==
- List of members of the National Council of Switzerland, 2023–2027
