= Beat Flach =

Swiss politician

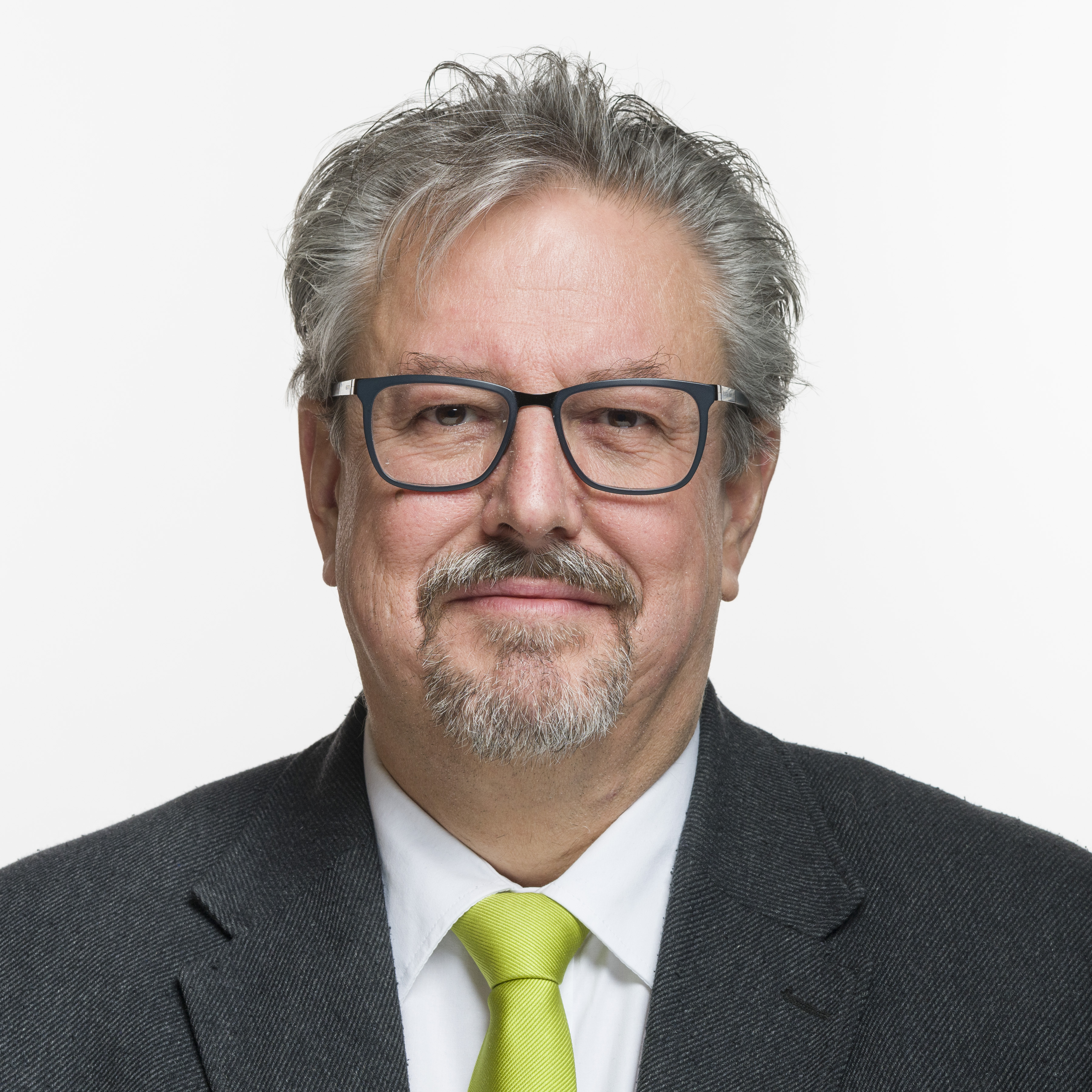

Personal details
- Born: 21 January 1965 (age 60); Bern, Switzerland
- Political party: GLP
- Occupation: Politician

Beat Flach (born 21 January 1965) is a Swiss politician (GLP).

== Political career ==
Flach was one of the founding members of the cantonal Aargau GLP in 2008. On 8 March 2009 he was elected to the Grand Council of Aargau. In the elections on 23 October 2011, he was elected to the National Council. He is a member of the Legal Affairs Committee, the Security Policy Committee and the Judicial Committee. Flach is involved, among other things, in the areas of human rights (war material exports, corporate responsibility, abolition of the "majesty affront article") and social policy (restructuring procedures for the heavily indebted, vocational training for young people with disabilities). He was confirmed in office as a National Councillor in the 2019 general elections.
