= Céline Weber =

Swiss politician (born 1974)

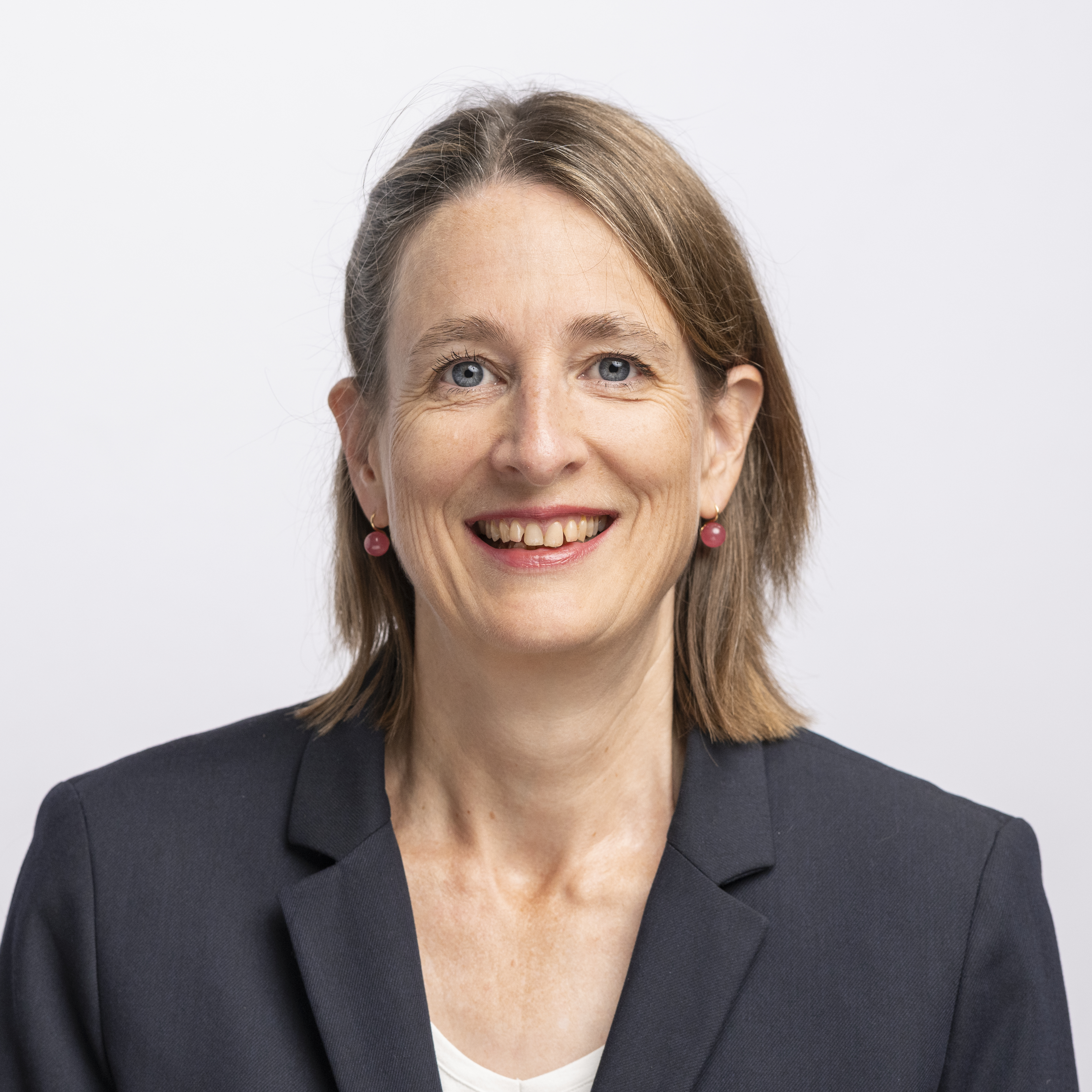
Céline Weber (2023)

Céline Weber (born 22 August 1974 in Chêne-Bougeries) is a Swiss politician from the Green Liberal Party (GLP).

== Biography ==
Weber completed her doctorate in mechanical engineering at the Swiss Federal Institute of Technology Lausanne (EPFL) on district heating and received a scholarship from the Swiss National Science Foundation to promote scientific research. From 2001 to 2002, she initially conducted research into green technologies at the University of Tokyo and the University of London before working as an energy consultant.

She has been a member of the National Council since 29 November 2021, replacing Isabelle Chevalley, who stepped down.

== Publications ==
- Multi-objective design and optimization of district energy systems including polygeneration energy conversion technologies, 2007, doi:10.5075/epfl-thesis-4018
- mit Steven Kraines, Michihisa Koyama, Toshiharu Ikaga, Tomoyuki Chikamoto, David Wallace, Hiroshi Komiyama (2005), "A collaborative platform for sustainable building design based on model integration over the internet", International Journal of Environmental Technology and Management, vol. 5, no. 2/3, p. 135, doi:10.1504/ijetm.2005.006847
- mit Michihisa Koyama, Steven Kraines: CO2-emissions reduction potential and costs of a decentralized energy system for providing electricity, cooling and heating in an office-building in Tokyo. In: Energy. Band 31, Nr. 14, November 2006, S. 3041–3061, doi:10.1016/j.energy.2005.12.003.
- mit Daniel Favrat: Conventional and advanced CO2 based district energy systems. In: Energy. Band 35, Nr. 12, December 2010, S. 5070–5081, doi:10.1016/j.energy.2010.08.008.
- Multi-Objective Design and Optimisation of Urban Energy Systems. In: Energy Systems Engineering (= Process Systems Engineering). 2008 (online auf epfl.ch retrieved 26 February 2023).
