= Matthias Jauslin =

Swiss businessman and politician

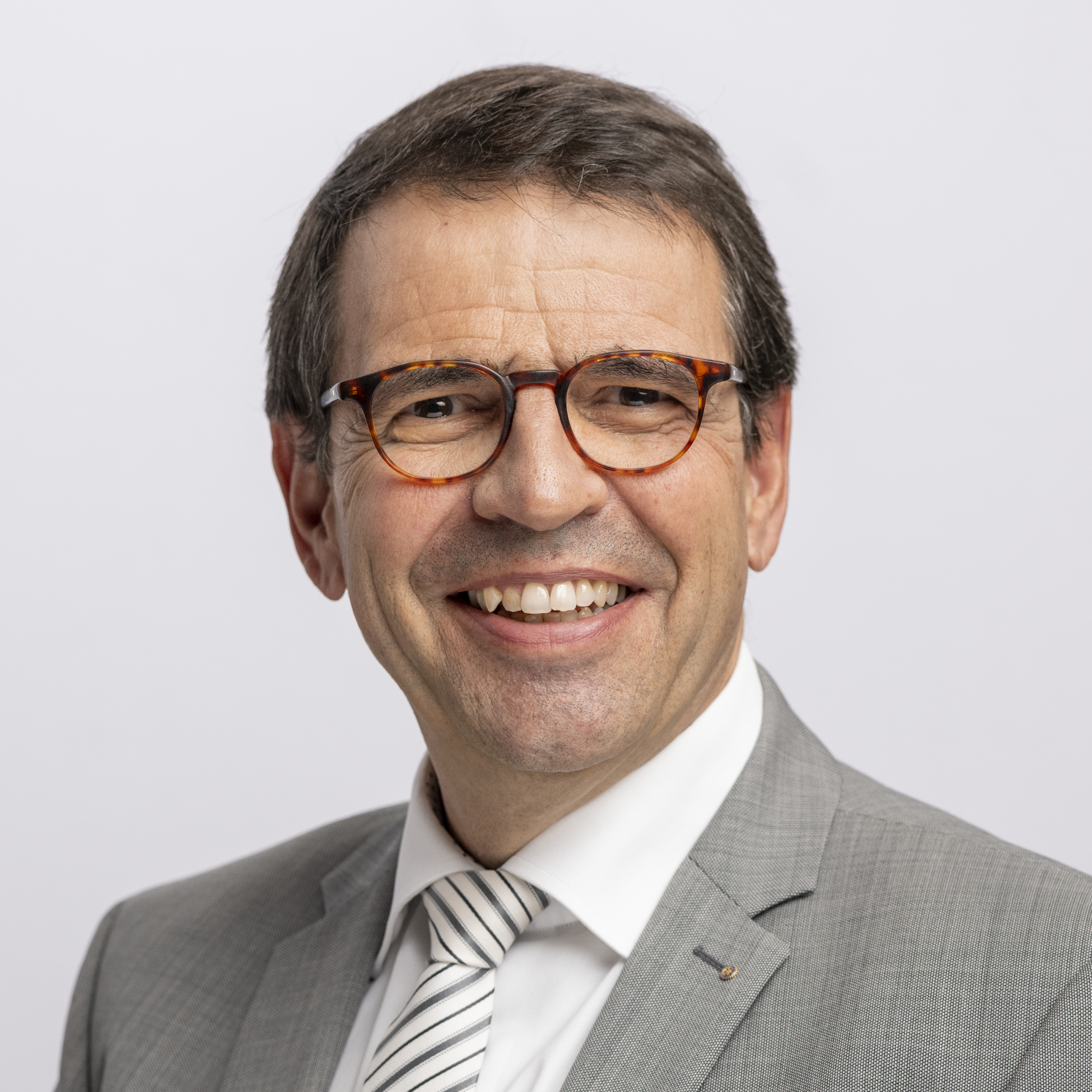
- Jauslin in 2023

Member of the National Council (Switzerland)
- Incumbent
- Assumed office 30 November 2015

Personal details
- Born: Matthias Samuel Jauslin; 20 March 1962 (age 64) Winterthur, Zürich, Switzerland
- Spouse: Yvonne Zimmermann (m. 1987)
- Children: 3
- Education: Swiss Technical College Winterthur (STF)
- Website: matthias-jauslin.ch (in German)

Military service
- Allegiance: Switzerland
- Branch/service: Swiss Armed Forces
- Rank: Lieutenant

Matthias Samuel Jauslin (/dʒɒrsslɪn/ born 20 April 1962) is a Swiss businessman and politician. He currently serves as a member of the National Council (Switzerland) for The Liberals since 2015. He previously served as a member of the Grand Council of Aargau between 2009 and 2015.

In January 2025, he announces his change of party for the Green Liberal Party, dissatisfied with PLR/FDP climate policy.

== Early life and education ==
Jauslin was born on 20 April 1962 in Winterthur, Switzerland. He grew up in Gebensdorf near Baden, where he attended the local schools. He completed an apprenticeship as an electrician. Until 1988, he completed several higher diplomas of education in electrical engineering and business administration, most notably at the Swiss Technical College Winterthur (STF).

== Career ==
In 1989, Jauslin and two partners founded Jost Wohlen AG, a firm specializing in electrical systems, telematics, and automation. Until today he is the controlling shareholder and managing director of the company. Since 2011, he is also the chairman of Jost Aarau AG, which acts as a subsidiary. Between 1993 and 2011 he served as an expert of the final exams for the electrician apprentices (VAEI). His companies currently employ about 35 people and therefore is a typical Swiss SME.

Jauslin currently serves as vice president of the founding committee of the Development Foundation Technopark Aarau and executive director of the Athleticum Niedermatten Wohlen Association.

== Politics ==
Jauslin started his political career as a member of the municipal and governing council of Wohlen, Aargau between 1998 and 2013. He was vice mayor and served as head of the finance commission. Between 2009 and 2015, he served as a member of the Grand Council of Aargau for The Liberals, simultaneously between 2013 and 2017 as president of The Liberals Aargau. In the 2015 Swiss federal election he was elected into National Council (Switzerland) succeeding Philipp Müller, after Müller was elected into the Council of States (Switzerland). He assumed office on 30 November 2015.

== Personal life ==
Since 1987, Jauslin is married to Yvonne (née Zimmermann), they have three children; Livia (b. 1990), Severin (b. 1993) and Marius (b. 1996). He resides in Wohlen.

He campaigns for more transparency in Swiss politics and therefore has made his taxable income public information, available on his website.
