= Martin Bäumle =

Swiss politician (born 1964)

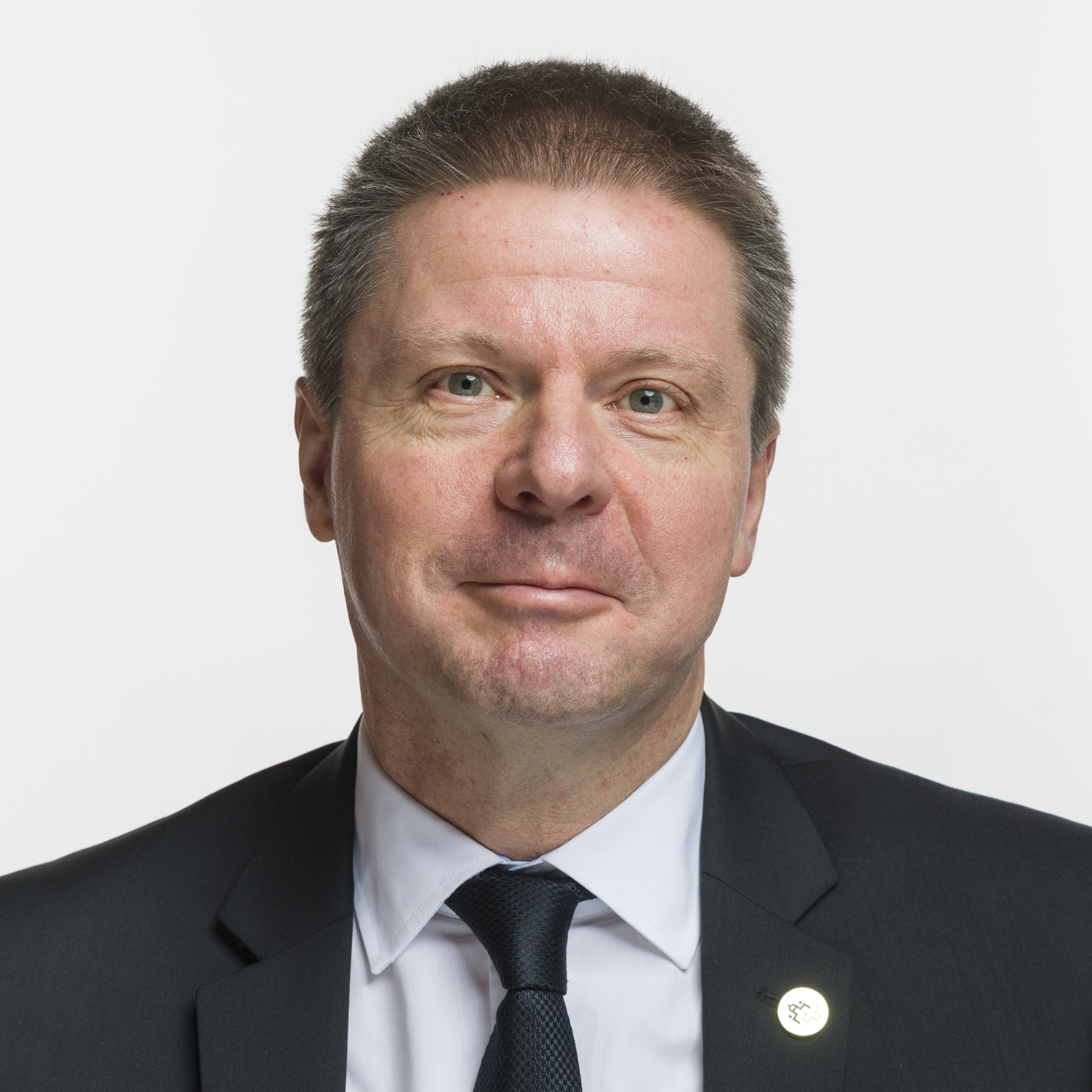

Member of the National Council of Switzerland
- Incumbent
- Assumed office 1 December 2003
- Constituency: Canton of Zürich

President of the Green Liberal Party of Switzerland
- In office 19 July 2007 – 26 August 2017
- Succeeded by: Jürg Grossen

Member of the Cantonal Council of Zürich
- In office May 1987 – May 1995
- In office May 1999 – May 2004
- Succeeded by: Jürg Grossen

Personal details
- Born: 3 June 1964 (age 62) Thalwil, Switzerland
- Party: Green Party of Switzerland; Green Liberal Party of Switzerland (after 2004)
- Occupation: Atmospheric scientist

Martin Bäumle MP (born 3 June 1964) is a Swiss scientist and politician. He has been a member of the National Council since 2003. Originally a member of the Green Party of Switzerland, he founded the Green Liberal Party of the Canton of Zürich in 2004 and the national party in 2007. He was the first president of the national Green Liberal Party from 2007 to 2017.

== Biography ==
Bäumle was born in Thalwil in the Canton of Zürich in 1964. He studied chemistry at ETH Zurich, the Swiss Federal Institute of Technology and earned a diploma in Atmospheric science.

In 1987, at the age of 23, Bäumle was elected to the Cantonal Council of Zürich as a member of the Green Party. With the exception of 1995 to 1999, he served on the council until 2004. He was also elected to the municipal council of Dübendorf in 1990 and in 1998, moved to the Executive Council for the municipality.

He served as the president of the Green Party of Zürich from 1998 to 2004. In 2004, he was defeated for re-election to the post by Balthasar Glättli. This led to a split in the Green movement as Bäumle and his supporters founded the Green Liberal Party in Zürich. Upon founding the national party in 2007, he was elected as the president. In the 2007 Swiss federal election, the Green Liberals tallied 1.4% of the votes and won three seats in the National Council.

The Green Liberals made significant gains in the 2011 elections, taking 5.4% of the vote and 12 seats in the National Council and two seats in the Council of States.

Bäumle launched an initiative to replace the country's VAT with an energy based tax on non-renewable resources. The measure came to a vote in March 2015 and was crushed with 92% of the voters going against the initiative. In the following elections the GLP's vote dropped to 4.6% and the party lost five seats in the National Council and both in the Council of States.

Bäumle had health problems leading up to the 2015 election, fainting in 2012 and a suffering a heart attack in 2014. In May 2017, after a decade at the head of the GLP, he announced that he would resign. Jürg Grossen succeeded him as the party president.

In early 2017, Bäumle joined the Green Cross International as its interim chairman. He took over as the organization was alleged to be near bankruptcy with the organization's founder Mikhail Gorbachev resigning from the board. In 2019, Bäumle revealed that the organization had fraudulent reporting of its balance sheet under its former managing director and the organization would continue, but with scaled back operations.

In 2019, Bäumle was ordered to pay 1,000 CHF to a construction company in a case dating back to 2011. Then, as a councilor in Dübendorf, he was accused of breaching official secrecy when he leaked negative credit information to a reporter a proposed public works project. Voters rejected the project and the construction company sued for compensation. Bäumle was convicted by a district court in Uster, but acquitted by the Appeals Court of Zürich in 2017. Bäumle was nevertheless ordered to pay the company compensation, but was himself compensated for his legal fees.
