= Natalie Rickli =

Swiss politician (born 1976)

- Official portrait, 2025

Member of the Executive Council of Zurich
- Incumbent
- Assumed office 24 March 2019
- Succeeded by: Martin Haab

Member of the National Council (Switzerland)
- In office 3 December 2012 – 2 June 2019

Personal details
- Born: Natalie Simone Rickli; 19 November 1976 (age 49) Winterthur, Switzerland
- Party: Swiss People's Party
- Domestic partner: Frank Eisenhut (since 2019)
- Website: Official website Parliament website

Natalie Simone Rickli (born 19 November 1976) is a Swiss politician and former consultant who currently serves as Member of the Executive Council of Zurich for the Swiss People's Party since 2019. She previously served on the National Council (Switzerland) from 2007 to 2019.

== Early life and education ==
Rickli was born 19 November 1976 in Winterthur, Switzerland, the oldest of three daughters, to Alfred Rickli (1944–2010), an auto body technician, and Marianne Rickli (née Scherrer; 1953–2018), a caregiver and newspaper carrier, into a Roman Catholic family.

She was raised in a family of modest means in the Winterthur suburb of Riet near Neftenbach. Her paternal family was originally from Madiswil in Oberaargau, Bern. During her youth she became acquainted with Chantal Galladé. Her parents ultimately divorced when she was still a teen.

Rickli expressed the desire to become a flight attendant, but ultimately decided for the more conservative option, completing a commercial apprenticeship at Fenaco, from 1992 to 1996. She later completed additional tertiary education as a publishers assistant as well as in education and marketing.

== Career ==
Rickli started her professional career in the publishing business. She then moved to the advertising industry, where she marketed print products and websites for sports, Weltwoche, PCtipp and Computerworld, among others. She worked at the former Qualiclick AG in Zollikon as a website manager, then at the publishing house IDG as head of advertising administration and marketing, later at AdLINK Schweiz AG as site relations manager, she switched to IP Multimedia (Switzerland) AG in 2009. Until the end of 2017, she worked in a variety of positions for Goldbach Media. Since 2018, she is the owner and principal consultant of communication@natalierickli, a public relations and communications agency.

== Politics ==
Rickli was elected as member of the National Council of Switzerland from the Canton of Zürich in 2007. She was part of the World Economic Forum's 2013 Young Leadership program. In March 2019, she was elected to the Executive Council of Zürich and appointed as the Director of Health. Rickli is a member of a Campaign for an Independent and Neutral Switzerland.

== Sexual harassment case ==
In 2014, a rap group composed a song that targeted Rickli with sexually charged lyrics. The group was prosecuted in Zürich and found guilty of defamation and abuse. That verdict was upheld by the cantonal court. The courts, however, found that the rappers were not guilty of sexual harassment in the grounds that Rickli did not listen to the song. A victim of harassment would have to be present to hear the abuse. The case was later sent to the federal courts, which also acquitted in the charge of sexual harassment.

== Personal life ==
Since 2019, Rickli has been in a relationship with Frank Eisenhut, who is Head of Real Estate Controlling at Swiss Life.
