= Operation Libero =

Liberal transpartisan political movement in Switzerland

- Formation: 13 October 2014
- Founders: Dominik Elser; Flavia Kleiner
- Type: Political movement
- Purpose: Liberalism; Pro-Europeanism
- Headquarters: Zürich
- Region served: Switzerland
- Members: 1,100 members (2017)
- Official language: German; French; Italian
- Co-Presidents: Stefan Manser-Egli; Sanija Ameti
- Website: operation-libero.ch/

Operation Libero is a liberal transpartisan political movement in Switzerland.

== History ==
Operation Libero was launched in the aftermath of the acceptance of the Swiss immigration referendum in October 2014 by members of the Swiss Forum on Foreign Policy (foraus), a Zürich-based think tank. It aims to promote an open-minded, multicultural and forward-looking Switzerland, as opposed to the national conservative and isolationist approach promoted by the Swiss People's Party (SVP/UDC) and the Campaign for an Independent and Neutral Switzerland (AUNS/ASIN/ASNI).

In February 2016, Operation Libero emerged as the driving force in the campaign against the referendum on the popular initiative on the effective expulsion of foreign criminals promoted by the SVP/UDC, which was eventually rejected thanks to a large mobilisation in metropolitan areas. The innovative and effective campaigning approach raised an unprecedented attention by domestic and foreign media. Other successful campaigns were run on referendums related to marriage equality (February 2016), asylum regulations (June 2016), and easier naturalisation for third-generation immigrants (February 2017).

At the end of August 2022, Operation Libero, together with La Suisse en Europe, Suisseculture, Volt Switzerland, the Association of Swiss Student Bodies (VSS) and the Green Party of Switzerland, founded the Europe Initiative, a civil society alliance aimed at obliging the Federal Council to open negotiations with the EU.

In late 2025, after Ameti and Manser-Egli announced their intent to step down as co-presidents, president of the Young Liberals Jonas Lüthy and vice-president Melanie Racine offered their candidacy for the co-presidency of Operation Libero to: "Renovate" and "make them liberal again". By the media, this was seen as a provocative move as the Young Liberals are seen as more classical liberal in contrast to Operation Libero's social liberalism.

== Structure ==
Operation Libero is structured as a national association with regional sections in Basel, Bern, Geneva and Zürich.

The head office is located in the Langstrasse district in Zürich.

== Positions ==
Operation Libero defines itself as a liberal transpartisan political movement. It stands for "an upheaval in the Swiss political landscape" and promotes the recognition interdependences at global and European level, freedom, progress and the rule of law. Its key position are the defence and promotion of free movement of persons between Switzerland and the European Union, a liberal immigration policy for third country nationals, citizenship rights based on residence, a close and constructive relationship with the European Union including an open discussion about membership, as well as an equal treatment of all forms of relationships including the legal recognition of same-sex marriage.

Its liberal approach is inspired by the principles of egalitarian justice, multicultural citizenship and constitutional patriotism. Its agenda can be described as social liberal and pro-European.

== Campaigning ==
Operation libero does not participate in political elections, but it is involved in referendum campaigns. It has a strong presence in social media through a team of "online warriors," it organises activities at local level through its regional branches, and it is regularly invited at talkshows in the national talk shows.

It is funded through membership fees and targeted crowdfunding campaigns.

== Co-Presidents ==
- Dominik Elser (2014–2016)
- Flavia Kleiner (2014-2020)
- Nicolas Zahn (2016)
- Laura Zimmermann (2016-2021)
- Stefan Manser-Egli (since 2020)
- Sanija Ameti (since 2021)

== See also ==
- Liberalism and radicalism in Switzerland
- Contributions to liberal theory
- Liberalism worldwide
- Liberal democracy
