= Jürg Grossen =

Swiss politician (born 1969)

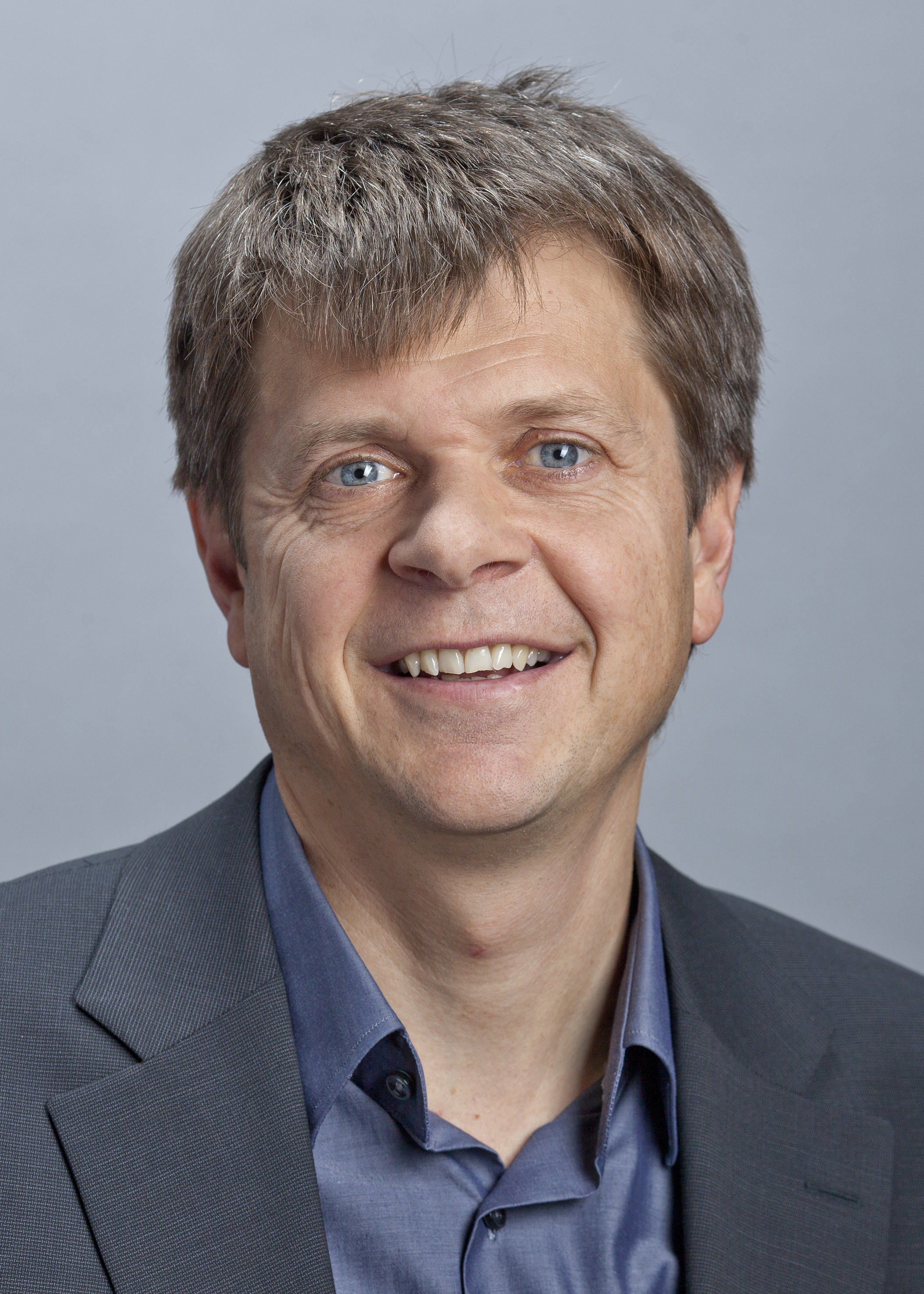

Member of the National Council of Switzerland
- Incumbent
- Assumed office 5 December 2011
- Constituency: Canton of Bern

President of the Green Liberal Party of Switzerland
- Incumbent
- Assumed office 26 August 2017
- Preceded by: Martin Bäumle

Personal details
- Born: 24 August 1969 Frutigen, Switzerland
- Party: Green Liberal Party of Switzerland
- Occupation: Electrical planner/Entrepreneur

Jürg Grossen (born 24 August 1969) is a Swiss politician. He is a member of the National Council. Since 2017, he has been the president of the Green Liberal Party of Switzerland.

He was born in the town of Frutigen in the Canton of Bern. He apprenticed as an electrical planner and worked for a solar energy company. After the death of the company's owner, Grossen and a colleague were left in charge of the firm.

He joined the Green Liberal Party, which was founded in 2007 and later opened a cantonal affiliate in Bern. In 2011, he ran for the National Council. Grossen was elected as the party increased its vote share to 5.4% with 12 seats. In 2015, he was re-elected.

Grossen was named as a party vice president in 2016. In 2017, the party president, Martin Bäumle announced his intent to leave the post. Grossen was elected to succeed Bäumle.

In the 2019 election, Grossen was re-elected and the Green Liberals increased the vote share to 7.8%, taking 16 seats.

Grossen has advocated for the end of nuclear power in Switzerland. He is a supporter of marriage equality. As part of his party's climate plan, Grossen supported ending subsidies to cattle farmers to reduce meat consumption and increase payments to plant-based products.
