= Coghuf =

Swiss painter (1905–1976)

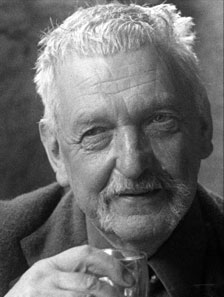
- Born: Ernst Stocker; 28 October 1905; Basel, Switzerland
- Died: 13 February 1976 (aged 70); Muriaux, Switzerland
- Other name: Coghuf
- Occupation: Painter
- Known for: Painting, drawing, murals, stained-glass windows, tapestries
- Relatives: Hans Stocker

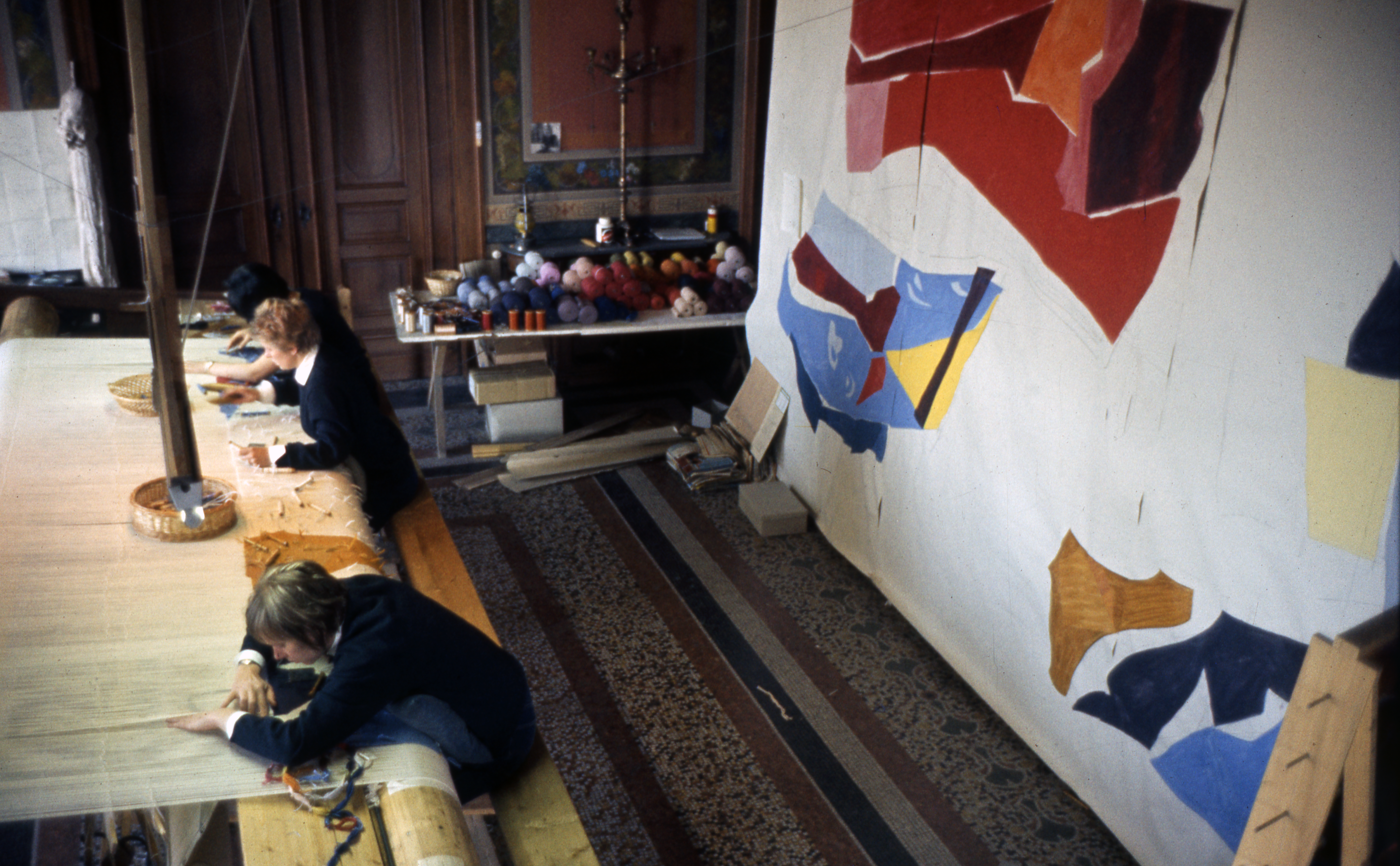
Weavers creating the University of St. Gallen Aula tapestry after a design by Coghuf

Ernst Stocker (28 October 1905 – 13 February 1976), better known as Coghuf, was a Swiss painter associated with Gruppe Rot-Blau. After training as an ornamental ironworker and spending time in Paris, he turned to painting around 1927. His work included paintings, drawings, murals, stained-glass windows and tapestries, with public commissions in Switzerland and France.

== Biography ==
Coghuf was born Ernst Stocker on 28 October 1905 in Basel. He was the brother of the painter Hans Stocker. From 1920 to 1924, he trained as an ornamental ironworker.

Like his older brother, Stocker went to Paris, where he lived from 1925 to 1927 and earned his living in the ironworking trade. There he became acquainted with Jacques Lipchitz and studied with Willi Baumeister. Around 1927, he adopted the artist name Coghuf and turned to painting. After returning to Switzerland, he joined the re-established Gruppe Rot-Blau in Basel in 1928.

Coghuf spent further periods abroad, including a stay in Paris in 1931 and 1932, where he attended the Académie de la Grande Chaumière. In the mid-1930s, he settled in the Franches-Montagnes in the Jura, first in Le Bémont and then in Saignelégier. In 1939, he married Hedwig Rudin of Basel. He lived in Muriaux from 1946 until his death on 13 February 1976.

== Work ==
Coghuf worked primarily in painting and drawing, but his practice also extended to graphic art, wall painting, stained-glass windows and tapestry. He produced public commissions in Basel, Altstätten, Moutier, Soubey and other locations in Switzerland and France.

His early paintings included landscapes, still lifes, figures and portraits. From the mid-1930s, his work included landscapes of the Jura. From 1957 onward, he produced several stained-glass windows, as well as tapestries and enamel works.

== Selected public works ==
In 1961, Coghuf won a competition for the artistic design of the Aula at the University of St. Gallen. The commission included stained-glass windows and a tapestry. The university council confirmed the jury’s decision in February 1962. The glass windows were completed by the end of May 1963, and the tapestry by the end of that year.

Other public works from the late 1960s and early 1970s included the artistic design of the Church of the Good Shepherd in Altstätten, the mural Der Winter for the Progymnasium in Binningen, a stained-glass window for the Mettenberg chapel, and a stained-glass window for the church of Saint-François d’Assise in Mulhouse.

== Legacy ==
In 2021, art historian Yves Guignard published a monograph on Coghuf after researching the artist's archive in Muriaux and contacting private collectors. The monograph included works that had remained in museum depots and private collections.
