= Kathrin Bertschy =

Swiss economist and politician (born 1979)

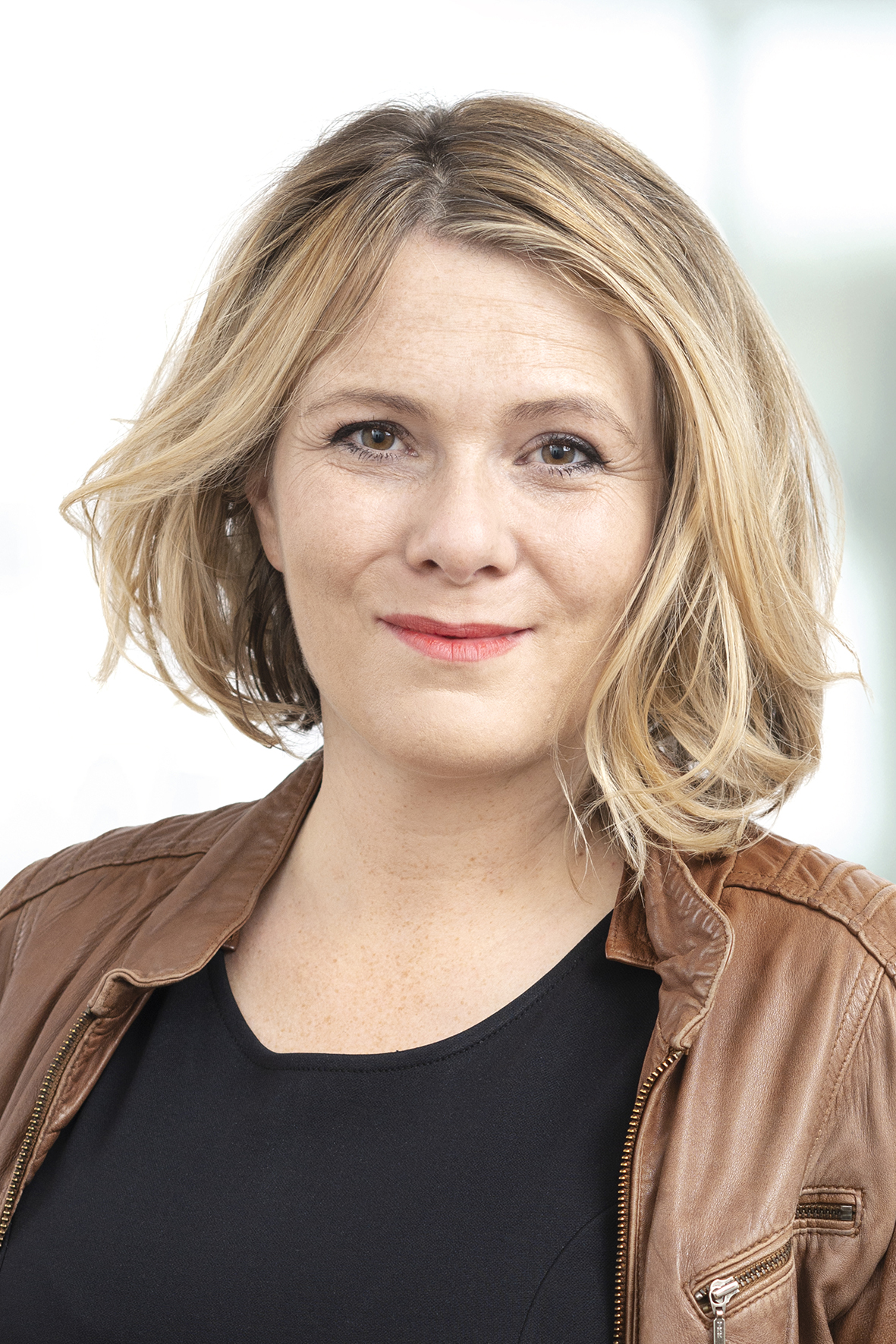
Campaign portrait from the 2019 election

Kathrin Bertschy (born 2 July 1979) is a Swiss economist and politician. Bertschy currently serves in the National Council as a member of the Green Liberal Party.

== Early life ==
Prior to politics, Bertschy worked as an economist. She received her master's degree in economics in 2007 and a Certificate in Science journalism in 2015. Between 2003 and 2014 Bertschy worked on a variety of research and consulting projects, including looking at wage discrimination faced by women entering the professional workplace. The report was part of the larger PNR 60 "Equality between Men and Women" project. Since 2012, she has been the director of the consulting firm Bertschy & Stocker.

Bertschy lives in Bern with her family and a daughter.

== Political career ==
Bertschy served on the city council of Bern from January 2009 to December 2011. One of the key issues she worked on in the city council was childcare vouchers.

Today Bern gives vouchers to cover childcare costs for families. At the same time, Bertschy served several leadership roles within the Green Liberals. Bertschy served as leader of the party in the City of Bern from June 2008 to November 2009, a member of the administrative council for the party at the Canton Level since 2008 and as vice-president of the national party since 2016.

Bertschy was elected a member of the National Council for the Canton of Bern in the 2011 Swiss federal election and was re-elected in the 2015 Swiss federal election. In the National Council, she has served as a member of the Economy and Royalties Committee since 2011, and since 2015 as a member of the Judiciary Committee and Social Security and Public Health Committees. Bertschy has focused on environmental reforms, agricultural subsidies as well as pushing for more transparency by elected officials.

In December 2013, Bertschy proposed a bill that would amend the federal constitution called "Civil Marriage for All". In August 2019 she proposed another motion for fourteen weeks of parental leave for each parent in order to assure equality in professional life.

In 2014 Bertschy was unanimously elected the co-president of the Alliance of Swiss Feminist Organizations (Alliance F), serving alongside National Councilor Maya Graf.

In 2016 Bertschy was one of the founders of the Green Liberal-affiliated thinktank glp lab, where she serves as the chair.
