= Green Liberal Party of Switzerland =

Swiss political party

Green Liberal Party of Switzerland: Grünliberale Partei (German); Parti vert'libéral (French); Partito Verde-Liberale (Italian); Partida Verda-Liberala (Romansh)
- Abbreviation: GLP; PVL
- President: Jürg Grossen
- Presidium: Melanie Mettler; Katja Christ; Céline Weber
- Founded: 19 July 2007; 19 years ago
- Split from: Green Party of Switzerland
- Headquarters: Monbijoustrasse 30, 3011 Bern
- Membership (2019): 5,000
- Ideology: Green liberalism
- Political position: Centre
- European affiliation: Alliance of Liberals and Democrats for Europe Party
- Colours: Light green Light blue
- Council of States: 1 / 46
- National Council: 10 / 200
- Cantonal executives: 2 / 154
- Cantonal legislatures: 154 / 2,544

Website
- grunliberale.ch (German) vertliberaux.ch (French) verdiliberali.ch (Italian)

The Green Liberal Party of Switzerland (German: Grünliberale Partei der Schweiz, GLP; Romansh: Partida verda-liberala, PVL; French: Parti vert'libéral, PVL; Italian: Partito verde liberale, PVL), is a green-liberal political party in Switzerland. Founded in 2007, the party holds eleven seats in the Federal Assembly as of the October 2023 election.

The party was formed on 19 July 2007 by four cantonal branches of the Green Party. Contesting the election in October 2007 in St. Gallen and Zurich, the party won three seats in the National Council. A month later, the party won a seat in the Council of States, with Verena Diener representing Zurich. The party has since expanded across Switzerland, and holds seats in thirteen cantonal legislatures in German-speaking Switzerland and the Romandy. The party reached 5.4% at the 2011 federal election, increasing the number of Members of the National Council from three to 12, suffered a setback in 2015 retreating to seven seats with 4.6% of the national vote, only to recover in 2019 by winning 16 seats with 7.8% of the vote.

The GLP are a party of the political centre in contrast to the centre-left to left-wing Green Party of Switzerland. They GLP seek to combine liberalism on civil liberties and moderate economic liberalism with environmental sustainability. Political scientist Andreas Ladner has described their policy as "as green as the Greens", but "significantly less left-wing" than them. The party has an autonomous parliamentary group in the Federal Assembly of Switzerland since the 2011 federal election.

== History ==
Logo from 2004 to October 2021

In 2004, two leading members of the Greens in Zurich, Verena Diener and Martin Bäumle, left the party citing its leftist tendencies and organisational concerns, and founded the Green Liberal Party of Zurich. The national party was founded on 19 July 2007 by four cantonal parties of the same name that had seceded from the Green Party. These branches were in Zurich, Basel-Landschaft, Bern, and St. Gallen.

In the 2007 election to the National Council on 22 October 2007, the party ran in Zurich and St. Gallen. Despite being limited to only two cantons, the party won 1.4% of the popular vote nationwide and three out of 200 seats. In Zurich, they won 7% of the vote and in St. Gallen they won 3.2%. One of these three had been a National Councillor for the Green Party in the previous Parliament. Success in the 2007 elections caused leaders to look to seriously compete for a seat on the Federal Council.

A month later, it won a seat in the Council of States, with Verena Diener representing Zurich. Along with the first appearance of the Green Party, this was the first time a minor party had won representation in the Council of States since 1995. When the Federal Assembly convened, the GLP joined the Christian Democrats/EPP/glp Group, making it the second-largest group, behind the Swiss People's Party. In 2010 the party got an additional seat in the Council of States with Markus Stadler from Uri.

At the 2011 federal election, the GLP was one of the big winners, increasing its vote share to 5.4%. It had stood in 11 cantons, getting between 2% and 10.3% of the vote.

The GLP was one of the leading political parties for legalising same-sex marriage in Switzerland, in which it was adopted in an optional referendum on 26 September 2021.

In October 2021, the GLP introduced a new, refreshed logo with the French slogan créateurs d'avenir (creators of the future). Since April 2022, there are cantonal parties in all 26 cantons.

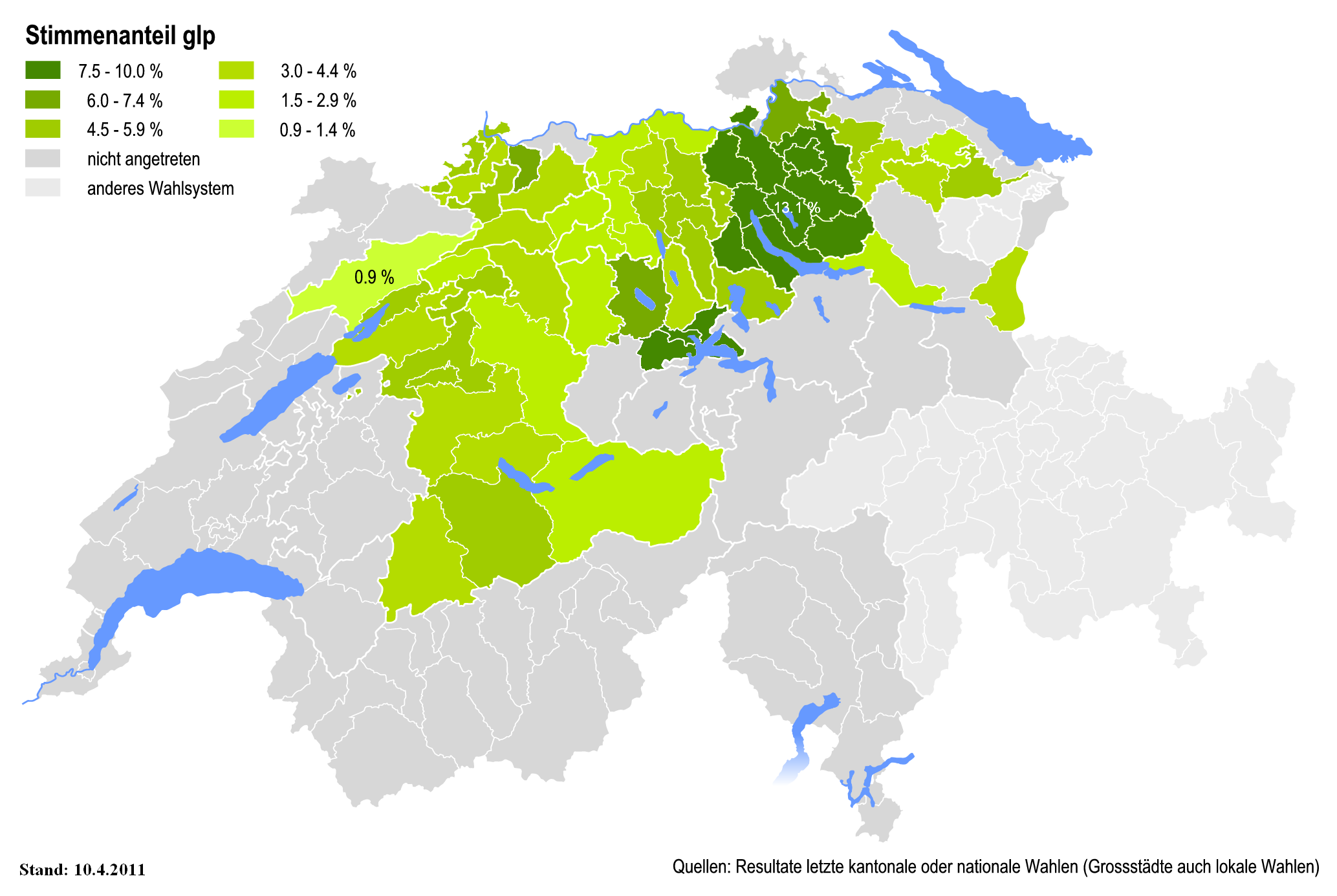
Percentages of the green liberal party at district level in 2011

== Ideology and platform ==
The party supports ending the use of nuclear energy in Switzerland and terminating any subsidies to nuclear power companies. At the same time, the GLP supports the promotion of green technologies and cleantech through tax credits as an economic opportunity. The party supports the criminalization of the corporal punishment of children.

On economic and fiscal matters the GLP is more centre-right. It supports Switzerland maintaining a balanced fiscal budget and continued tax competition between the Swiss cantons. It also supports stronger regulation of large Swiss banks such as UBS, including liquidity requirements.

The Green Liberals support closer EU-Swiss relations and on this question are considered ideologically closer to the Social Democrats and Green Party than to The Liberals or Swiss People's Party because they support Switzerland's accession to the European Economic Area. However, unlike the Swiss left the GLP support lifting the Swiss ban on exporting weapons to Ukraine. After the October 7 Attacks in Israel, the federal branch of the Green Liberals also expressed support for Israel declaring Hamas a terrorist organisation in a press release, as well as for stricter regulation of Swiss financial aid to the Palestinian Authority.

== Elected representatives ==
=== Council of States ===
- Tiana Angelina Moser (since 2023)

=== National Council ===
2023-2027 legislature:

- Martin Bäumle
- Kathrin Bertschy
- Beat Flach
- Jürg Grossen
- Patrick Hässig
- Katja Christ
- Corina Gredig
- Melanie Mettler (until 2025)
- Barbara Schaffner
- Céline Weber
- Fabienne Stämpfli (since 2025)
- Matthias Jauslin (since 2025)

== Election results ==
=== National Council ===
Election	Votes	%	Seats	+/–
2007	49,314	2.12 (#7)	3 / 200	New
2011	131,436	5.39 (#7)	12 / 200	▲9
2015	115,604	4.63 (#6)	7 / 200	▼5
2019	189,162	7.80 (#6)	16 / 200	▲9
2023	192,944	7.55 (#6)	10 / 200	▼6

== Party strength over time ==
Percentage of the total vote for the Green Liberal Party in Federal Elections 2007-2023
Canton	2007	2011	2015	2019	2023
Switzerland	1.4	5.4	4.6	7.8	7.6
Zürich	7.0	11.5	8.2	14.0	12.4
Bern	*^{a}	5.3	6.0	9.7	10.5
Lucerne	*	6.1	5.8	7.1	6.5
Uri	*	*	*	*	*
Schwyz	*	*	2.8	4.6	3.3
Obwalden	*	*	*	*	*
Nidwalden	*	*	*	*	*
Glarus	*	*	*	*	*
Zug	*	6.8	3.6	5.5	6.2
Fribourg	*	3.5	3.2	5.4	3.7
Solothurn	*	5.0	3.5	6.8	6.0
Basel-Stadt	*	5.8	4.8	5.7	9.1
Basel-Landschaft	*	5.0	2.7	5.3	7.0
Schaffhausen	*	*	*	5.9	6.8
Appenzell A.Rh.	*	*	*	*	*
Appenzell I.Rh.	*	*	*	*	*
St. Gallen	3.1	6.0	4.9	7.3	5.8
Grisons	*	8.3	7.9	8.3	6.3
Aargau	*	5.7	5.2	8.5	8.5
Thurgau	*	5.2	6.2	8.1	6.6
Ticino	*	*	0.8	1.0	1.5
Vaud	*	5.1	3.9	8.4	7.5
Valais	*	*	*	0.8	2.0
Neuchâtel	*	*	3.4	9.1	6.8
Geneva	*	3.2	2.3	5.4	6.7
Jura	*	*	*	*	2.4

1.^a* indicates that the party was not on the ballot in this canton.

== See also ==
- Environmental movement in Switzerland
