= Merz (surname) =

Merz is a German surname. Notable people with the surname include:

== Arts and entertainment ==
- Alessia Merz (b. 1974), Italian television personality
- Bruno Merz (b. 1976), New Zealand-born musician, composer, working in Netherlands
- Jon F. Merz (fl. 1990s), US author (Lawson Vampire series)
- Joseph Anton Merz (1681–1750), German painter
- Klaus Merz (b. 1945), Swiss writer
- Mario Merz (1925–2003), Italian artist
- Marisa Merz (1928–2019), Italian sculptor, widow of Mario Merz

== Politics ==
- Friedrich Merz (b. 1955), Chancellor of Germany since 2025
- Hans-Rudolf Merz (b. 1942), President of Switzerland (2009)
- Louis L. Merz (1908–2002), American politician from Wisconsin
- Nelson Merz (1917–1996), American politician from Nebraska

== Religion ==
- Annette Merz (b. 1965), German Protestant theologian, biblical scholar
- Ivan Merz (1896–1928), blessed, Croatian Catholic lay activist

== Sport ==
- Aaron Merz (b. 1983), American football player
- Charlie Merz (1888–1952) US racecar driver
- Curt Merz (1938–2022), American football player
- Matthias Merz (b. 1984), Swiss mountaineer
- Mischa Merz (b. 1967), Australian boxer, painter, journalist
- Otto Merz (1889–1933), German racecar driver
- Robert Merz (1887–1914), Austrian footballer
- Sue Merz (b. 1972), US ice hockey player, Olympic athlete (1998)
- William Merz (1878–1946), US gymnast, Olympic athlete (1904)

== Other fields ==
- Albert Merz (d. 1941), one of three German brothers who were imprisoned in Nazi Germany for refusing to bear arms.
- Alfred Merz (1880–1925), Austrian-German oceanologist
- Anna Merz (1931–2013), English conservationist
- Charles Hesterman Merz (1874–1940), pioneer of the UK's National Grid (for electricity distribution)
- Friedrich Merz (pharmacist) (1884–1979), German chemist, pharmacist, and entrepreneur
- Georg Merz (1793–1867), German optical instruments manufacturer
- HG Merz (b. 1947), German architect, museum designer
- Joachim Merz (b. 1948), German economist
- John Theodore Merz (1840–1922), English-born German chemist, historian, industrialist
- Karl Spruner von Merz (1803–1892), German cartographer, scholar
- Markus Merz, founder of software company OScar
- Teresa Merz (1879–1958), English social worker, philanthropist and magistrate

== See also ==
- Mertz, surname
- Mercier (disambiguation), includes a list of people with surname Mercier
