= Merz =

Merz may refer to:

- Merz (art style), a synonym for the more common term Dada
- Merz (musician), a British electro-folk singer
- Merz (surname)
  - Friedrich Merz, current Chancellor of Germany
- Merz Apothecary, a historic European perfume and wellness store in Chicago
- Merz & McLellan, a British electrical engineering consultancy
- Merz Peninsula, Palmer Land, Antarctica
- Merz Pharma, an international health care company

== See also ==
- Mers (disambiguation)
- Mertz, a surname
- MRZ (disambiguation)
- Murs (disambiguation)
