= Luc Recordon =

Swiss politician

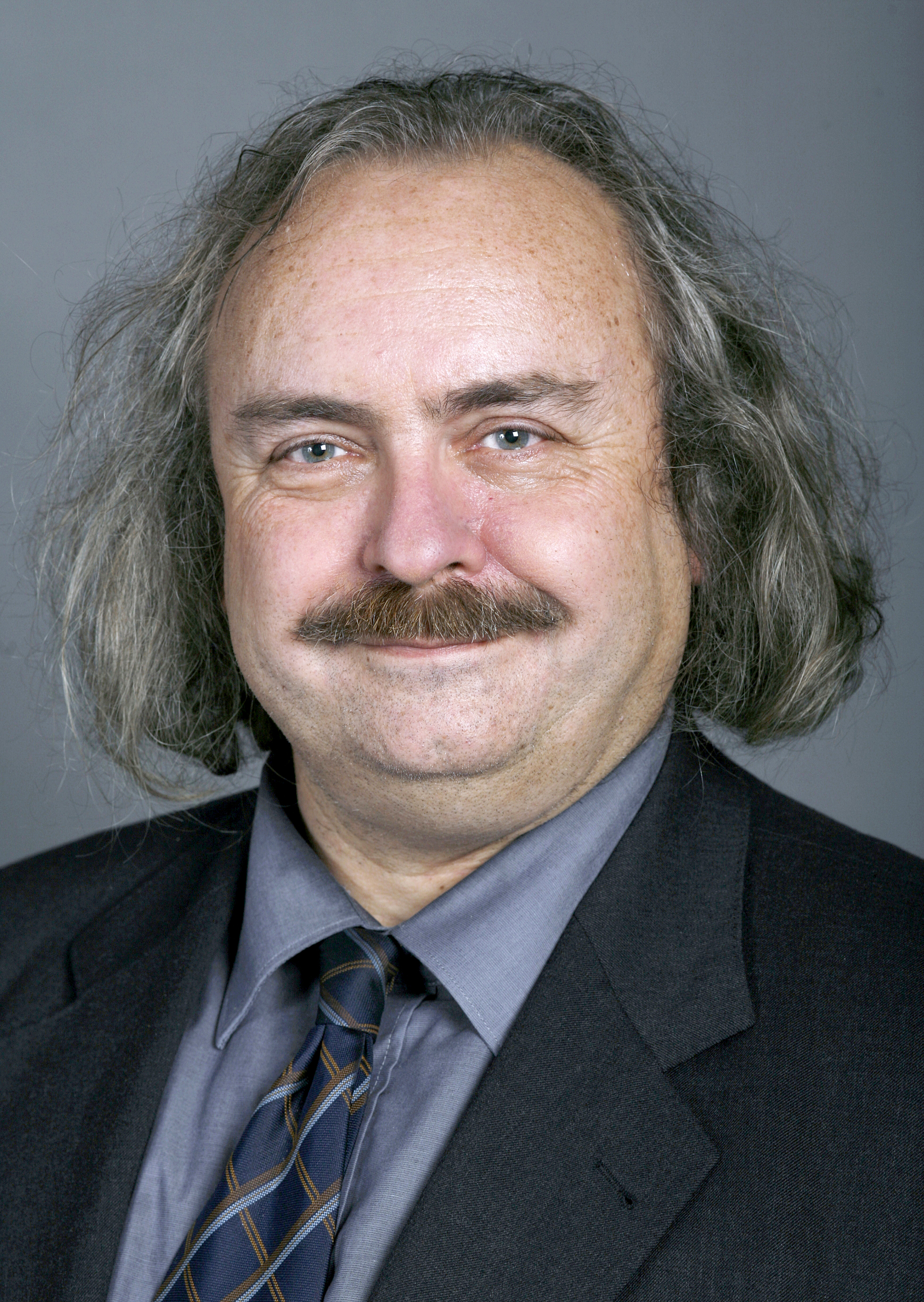
Recordon in 2007

Luc Recordon (born 20 September 1955, in Pully) is a Swiss politician. He is a member of the Green Party of Switzerland and represented Vaud in the Swiss National Council from 2003 to 2007 and in the Swiss Council of States from 2007 to 2015.

== Education ==
Luc Recordon was educated as an engineer at the École polytechnique fédérale de Lausanne and lawyer at the University of Lausanne. He holds a doctorate in jurisprudence.

== Political career ==
Recordon was elected to the local council of Jouxtens-Mézery in 1975, to the local government in 1989, and in 1990 to the Grand Council of Vaud.

He was also cantonal co-president of the Greens 1997 to 2001. From 2003 to 2007, he was a member of the National Council of Switzerland. In the 2007 elections, he won one of the first two seats of the Green Party in the Council of States, the other belonging to Robert Cramer of Geneva.

Recordon is affected by a severe congenital disease. The 16 June 2005, during a debate about preimplantation genetic diagnosis, he made a very emotional and applauded speech in front of the National Council.

Recordon is the official Green candidate for the Swiss Federal Council in the December 2007 elections, claiming the seat of Christoph Blocher. This candidacy was purely tactical, aiming to demonstrate opposition to the Swiss People's Party's right-wing populism and to encourage other counter-candidates. Recordon played no role in the election itself, and Eveline Widmer-Schlumpf was elected to replace Blocher. Recordon was also the official Green candidate in the 2008 Swiss Federal Council election.
