= Ueli Maurer =

Swiss Federal Councillor from 2009 to 2022

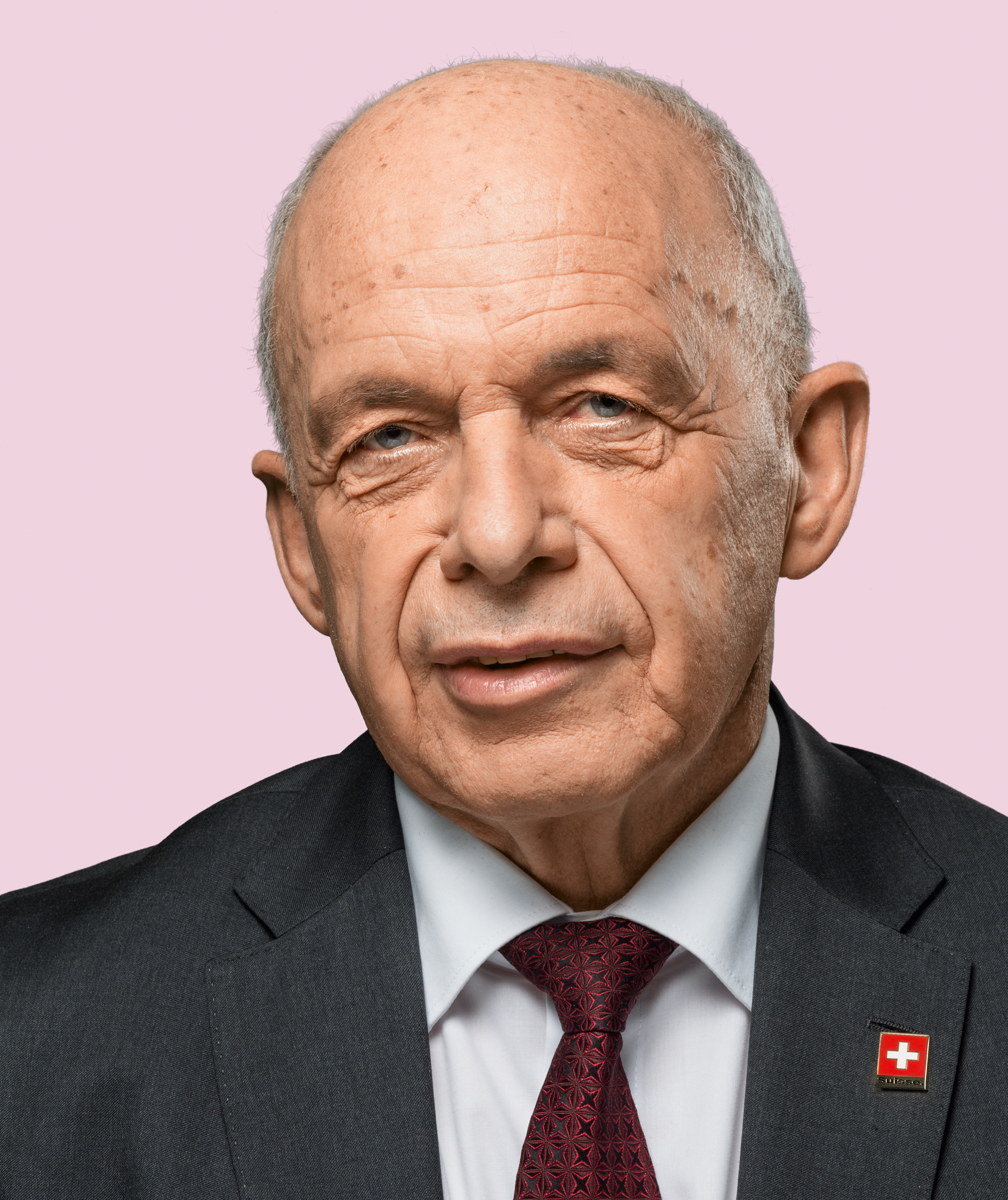
- Official portrait, 2022

President of Switzerland
- In office 1 January 2019 – 31 December 2019
- Vice President: Simonetta Sommaruga
- Preceded by: Alain Berset
- Succeeded by: Simonetta Sommaruga
- In office 1 January 2013 – 31 December 2013
- Vice President: Didier Burkhalter
- Preceded by: Eveline Widmer-Schlumpf
- Succeeded by: Didier Burkhalter

Vice President of Switzerland
- In office 1 January 2018 – 31 December 2018
- President: Alain Berset
- Preceded by: Alain Berset
- Succeeded by: Simonetta Sommaruga
- In office 1 January 2012 – 31 December 2012
- President: Eveline Widmer-Schlumpf
- Preceded by: Eveline Widmer-Schlumpf
- Succeeded by: Didier Burkhalter

Head of the Department of Finance
- In office 1 January 2016 – 31 December 2022
- Preceded by: Eveline Widmer-Schlumpf
- Succeeded by: Karin Keller-Sutter

Head of the Department of Defence, Civil Protection and Sports
- In office 1 January 2009 – 31 December 2015
- Preceded by: Samuel Schmid
- Succeeded by: Guy Parmelin

Member of the Swiss Federal Council
- In office 1 January 2009 – 31 December 2022
- Preceded by: Samuel Schmid
- Succeeded by: Albert Rösti

Member of the Swiss National Council
- In office 25 November 1991 – 31 December 2008
- Parliamentary group: Swiss People's Party
- Constituency: Zürich

Chairman of the Swiss People's Party
- In office 27 January 1996 – 1 March 2008
- Preceded by: Hans Uhlmann
- Succeeded by: Toni Brunner

Personal details
- Born: 1 December 1950 (age 75) Wetzikon, Zürich, Switzerland
- Party: Swiss People's Party
- Spouse: Anne-Claude Peter (m. 1976)
- Children: 6

Ulrich "Ueli" Maurer (Swiss Standard German: [ˈʊlrɪç ˈmaʊrər]; born 1 December 1950) is a Swiss politician who was a Member of the Swiss Federal Council from 2009 to 2022. A member of the Swiss People's Party (SVP/UDC), he was President of the Swiss Confederation in 2013 and 2019. Formerly head of the Federal Department of Defence, Civil Protection and Sports (2009–2015), Maurer headed the Federal Department of Finance from 2016 to 2022. From 2019 to 2022, he was the longest-serving sitting member of the Federal Council.

An accountant by occupation, Maurer chaired the Swiss People's Party from 1996 to 2008. Elected by the Swiss Federal Assembly to succeed Federal Councillor Samuel Schmid in 2008, he took office on 1 January 2009. Maurer was Vice President of Switzerland for 2012 and 2018 and President of Switzerland for 2013 and 2019. He was reelected to the Federal Council in 2011, 2015, and 2019.

== Early life and education ==
Maurer was born 1 December 1950 in Wetzikon, to Ulrich Maurer Sr., a financially destitute farmer, and Annemarie Maurer (née Knecht). His father did not own farmland and was only a leaseholder. His grandfather went to Alaska during the Gold rush.

Maurer was raised in the Zürcher Oberland. He completed a commercial apprenticeship, and completed a federal certification in accounting. Maurer was the only non-academic on the Federal Council until his resignation in 2022.

== Professional career ==
He was director of the Zürich Farmers' Association from 1994 to 2008 and president of the Swiss Vegetable Farmers' Association and the Farmers' Machinery Association (Maschinenring) until his election to the Federal Council.

Maurer is married and has six children and currently resides in Hinwil in the canton of Zürich. He served in the Swiss Army with the rank of major, commanding a bicycle infantry battalion.

== Political career ==
=== Cantonal politics ===
From 1978 to 1986, Maurer was a member of the municipal government of Hinwil. He was elected to the cantonal parliament of Zürich in 1983, which he presided over in 1991. In that year, he lost an election to the cantonal government against Moritz Leuenberger, as his opponents derided Maurer's campaign as inept and himself as a naïve devotee of party strongman Christoph Blocher. In the same year's national election, though, Maurer was elected to the National Council.

=== National career and party leadership ===
In 1996, at Blocher's behest, Maurer was elected to the presidency of the Swiss People's Party. Not taken seriously at first and parodied by TV comedian Viktor Giacobbo as Blocher's servile sycophant so memorably that his taunted children regularly returned from school in tears, his presidency saw the party double its voter base, establish itself in the French-speaking part of Switzerland and become the country's strongest political party. These successes have been largely credited to Maurer's leadership, who was able to make up a lack of charisma with hard work, the imposition of strict party discipline, a keen sense for promising populist issues (such as opposition to European integration, foreigners and political correctness) as well as a penchant for headline-grabbing soundbites, as attested by an often-cited statement of his: "As long as I talk of negroes, the camera stays on me".

As president of the People's Party, Maurer was a leading force behind the party's aggressive and successful populist campaigns – campaigns that drew the ire of the Swiss political mainstream and the concern of foreign observers – signing off on cartoonish posters attacking leftists, foreigners and other undesirables. In a breach with Swiss political etiquette, he did not shy away from direct personal attacks on fellow politicians, labeling the center-right Free Democrats as "softies", Social Democratic voters as deranged, and renegade Federal Councillors Schmid and Eveline Widmer-Schlumpf as "appendices" requiring excision. Nonetheless, Maurer was able to keep his public persona separate from the way his colleagues in Parliament perceived him. In the National Council, his personal stature grew during his service and even political opponents credited his personal integrity, collegial demeanour and solid grasp of political issues. His good professional relations with Social Democratic women representatives were particularly noted by puzzled political observers.

Even as his and his party's star rose, however, relations between Maurer and his longtime mentor Blocher slowly cooled, even though the two men remained strong allies in public. Blocher, used to exercising authoritarian leadership as the party's undisputed leading figure, did not approve of Maurer questioning some of his strategic approaches, and increasingly exercised power through a close-knit circle of followers instead of through Maurer and the party secretariat. In October 2007, after the People's Party won its greatest electoral victory to date, Maurer resigned as party president and was succeeded against his wishes by Toni Brunner, one of Blocher's close confidants, on 1 March 2008. After losing a runoff election for a Council of States seat against Verena Diener, Maurer contented himself with the presidency of the Zürich section of the People's Party.

=== Swiss Federal Council ===
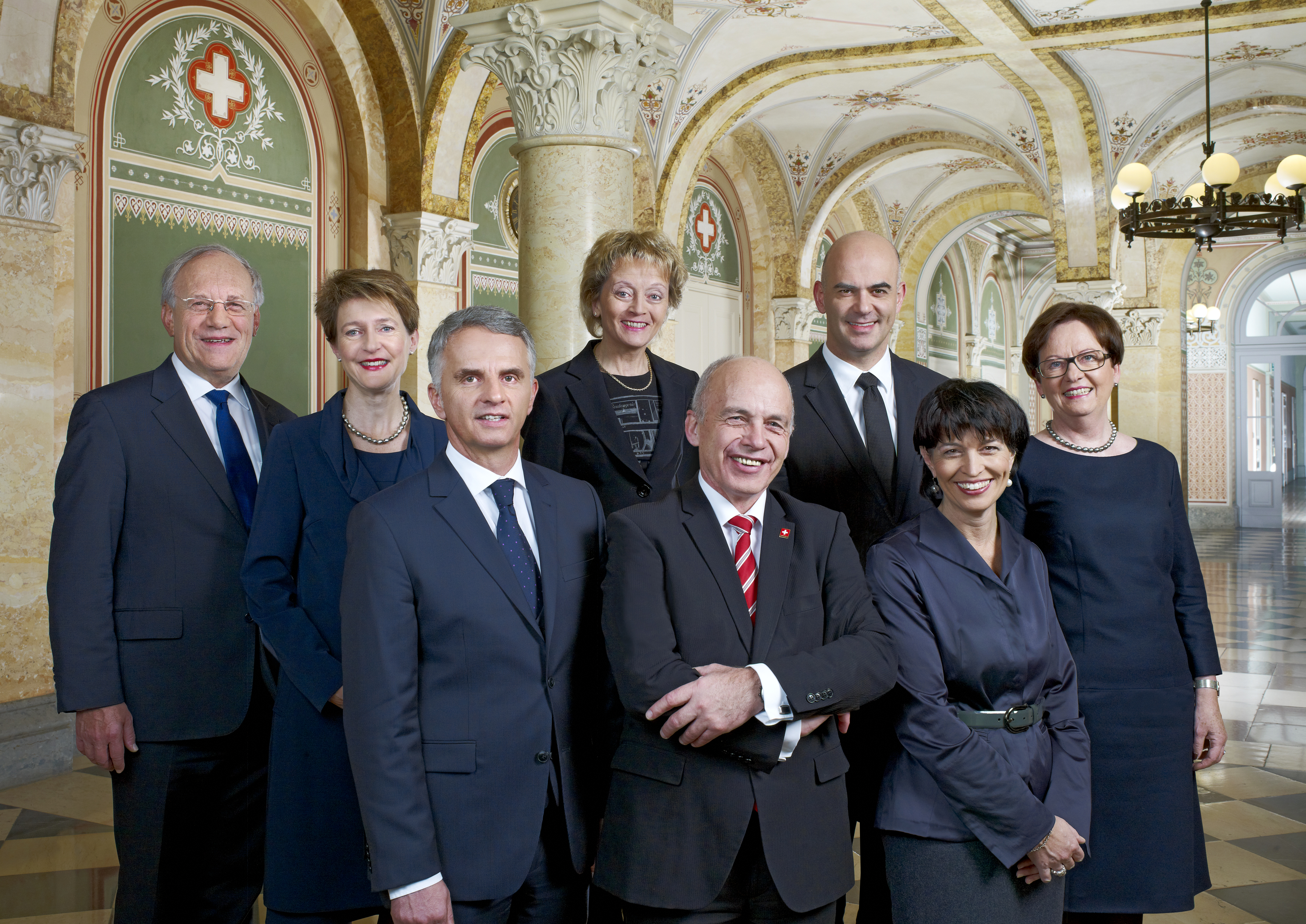
2013 Swiss Federal Council

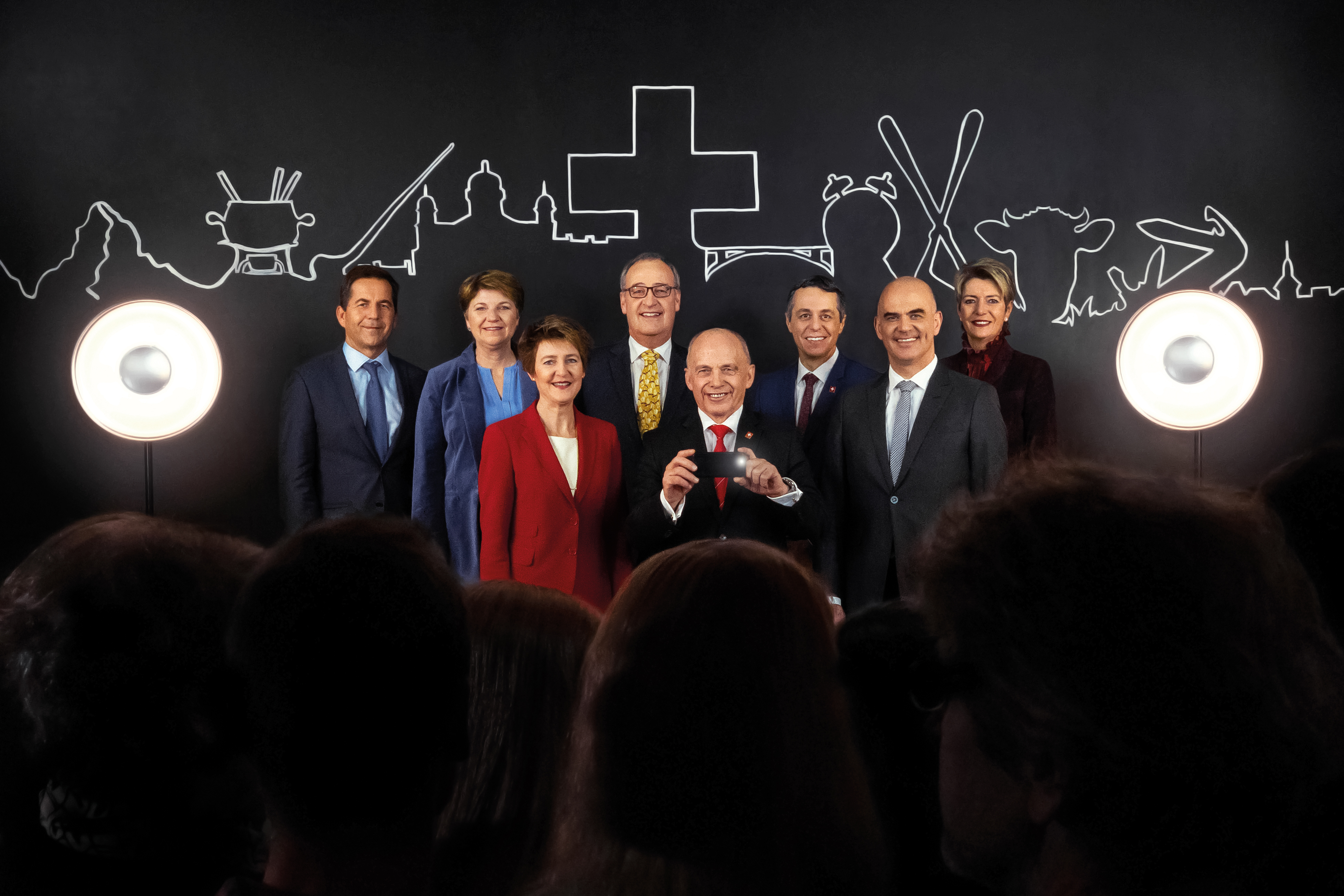
2019 Swiss Federal Council

On 27 November 2008, the party's parliamentary group unanimously nominated both Maurer and Blocher as candidates to succeed Schmid as Federal Councillor. With Blocher – who was ousted from the Federal Council in 2007 – considered unelectable by all other parties, the Neue Zürcher Zeitung and other Swiss media called Maurer the clear frontrunner for the Council seat even before his nomination. On 10 December 2008 Maurer was elected to the Federal Council in the third round of voting with 122 votes, a margin of a single vote.

Maurer was elected Vice President of Switzerland for 2012, alongside President Eveline Widmer-Schlumpf. On 5 December 2012 he was elected President of the Swiss Confederation for 2013.

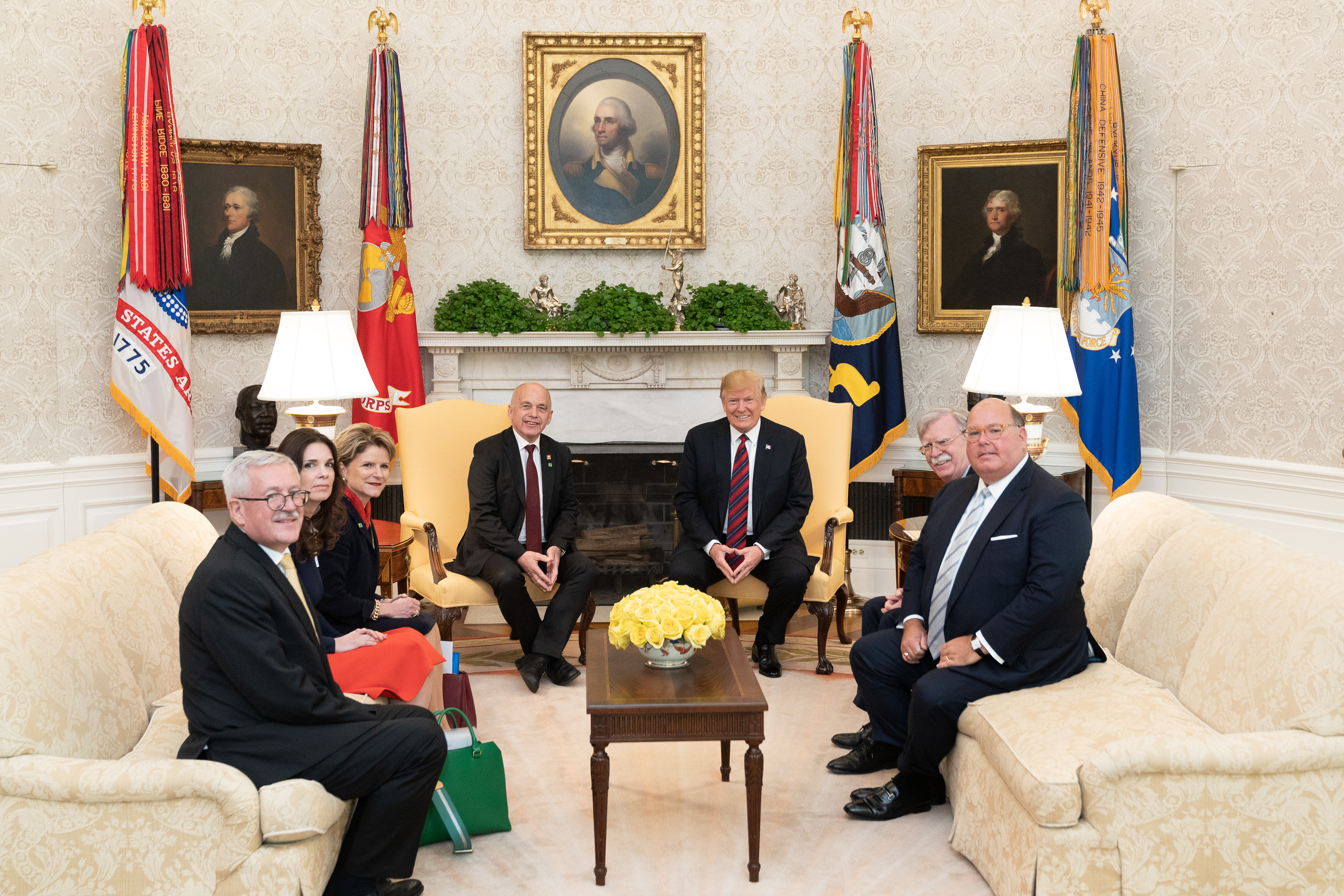
Maurer with US President Donald Trump at the White House in 2019

Maurer was reelected as federal councillor on 8 December 2015; on 11 December 2015 he was selected to become head of the Federal Department of Finance, with newly-elected federal councillor Guy Parmelin, a fellow member of the SVP/UDC, replacing him as head of the Federal Department of Defence, Civil Protection and Sports. As Switzerland's finance minister, Maurer attended the 2017 G20 Hamburg summit, becoming the first federal councillor to attend a G20 summit.

Maurer became President of the Swiss Confederation for a second time for 2019 after serving as vice president under Alain Berset in 2018. On 29 April 2019, during his visit in China, Maurer signed a Memorandum of Understanding under the Belt and Road Initiative. On 16 May 2019, Maurer met President Donald Trump in the White House, becoming the first Swiss president to meet a United States president in that location. The two discussed several issues, including Iran and a potential free trade agreement.

On 20 September 2022 Maurer announced his resignation, effective 31 December.

== Later career ==
On 1 January 2023, Maurer joined the ethics committee of the International Olympic Committee.

In February 2024, Maurer criticized "hysteria around Covid" and vaccine mandates, and defended his actions as Federal Councillor during the pandemic.

== Personal life ==
In 1976, Maurer married Anne-Claude Peter, a social worker, who was the daughter of Jacques Peter, originally a carpenter, who was a missionary in Ghana. They were introduced at Seattle–Tacoma International Airport during travels, as she was in the U.S. as an au pair and he traveled to Alaska, following his grandfathers footsteps. They had six children;

- Ulrich "Ueli" Maurer, Jr. (born 1978), an economist, who is CEO of Aebi Schmidt in Norway.
- Benjamin "Ben" Maurer (born 1981), a farmer and saddler, married to Claudia Gretener, resides in Horsefly, British Columbia.
- Ursina Maurer (born 1983)
- Björn Maurer (born 1986)
- Sidonia Anna Maurer (born 1990)
- Corsin Maurer (born 1997)

Additionally, the family hosted several foster children over the years.

Political offices
Preceded by Samuel Schmid	Member of the Swiss Federal Council; 2009–2022	Succeeded by Albert Rösti
Preceded by Samuel Schmid	Head of the Department of Defence, Civil Protection and Sports; 2009–2016	Succeeded by Guy Parmelin
Preceded by Eveline Widmer-Schlumpf	Vice President of Switzerland; 2012	Succeeded by Didier Burkhalter
Preceded by Eveline Widmer-Schlumpf	President of Switzerland; 2013	Succeeded by Didier Burkhalter
Preceded by Eveline Widmer-Schlumpf	Head of the Department of Finance; 2016–2022	Succeeded by Karin Keller-Sutter
Preceded by Alain Berset	Vice President of Switzerland; 2018	Succeeded by Simonetta Sommaruga
Preceded by Alain Berset	President of Switzerland; 2019	Succeeded by Simonetta Sommaruga
