= 2007 Swiss Federal Council election =

Swiss government election

- 12 December 2007

All 7 seats to the Swiss Federal Council
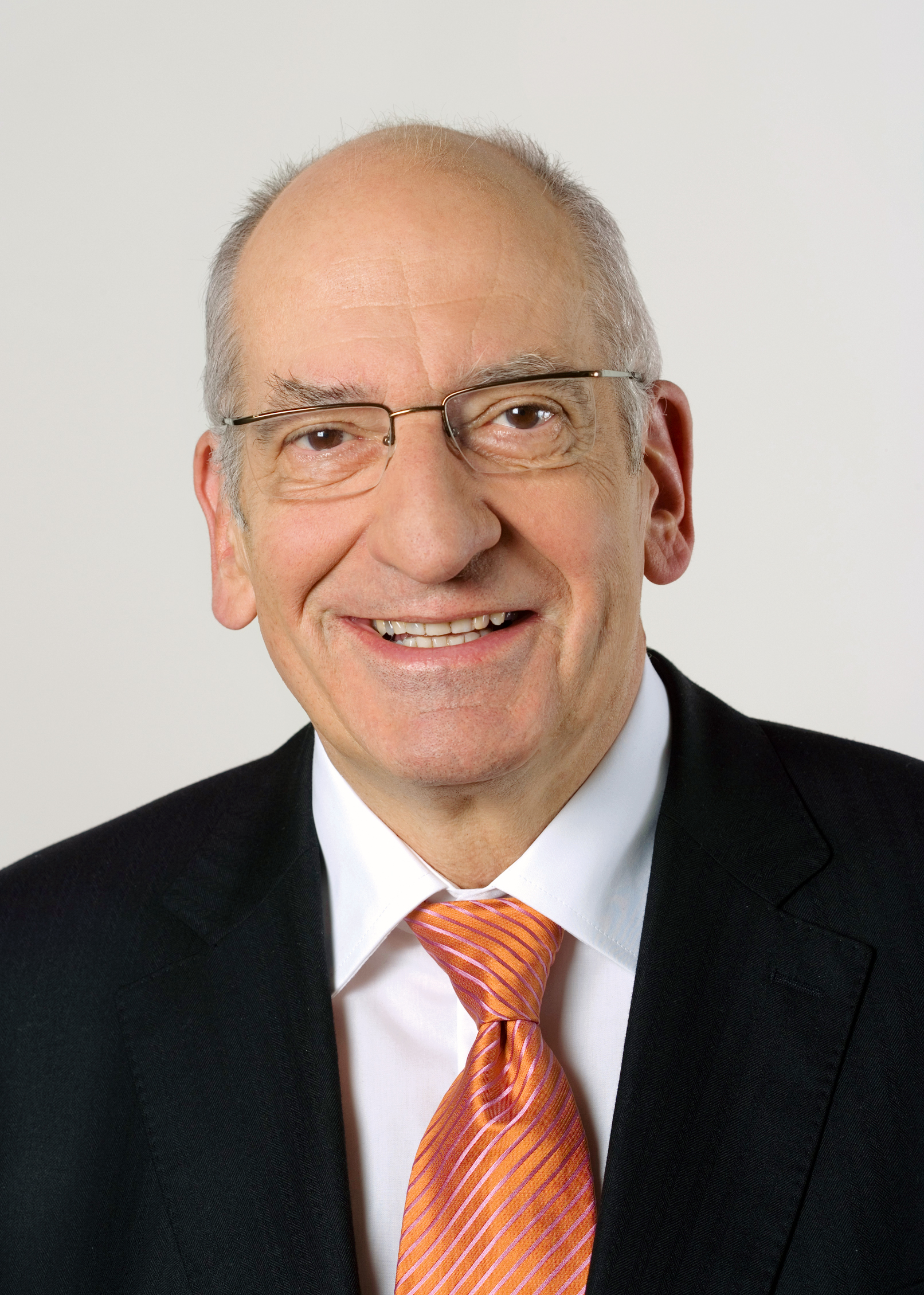

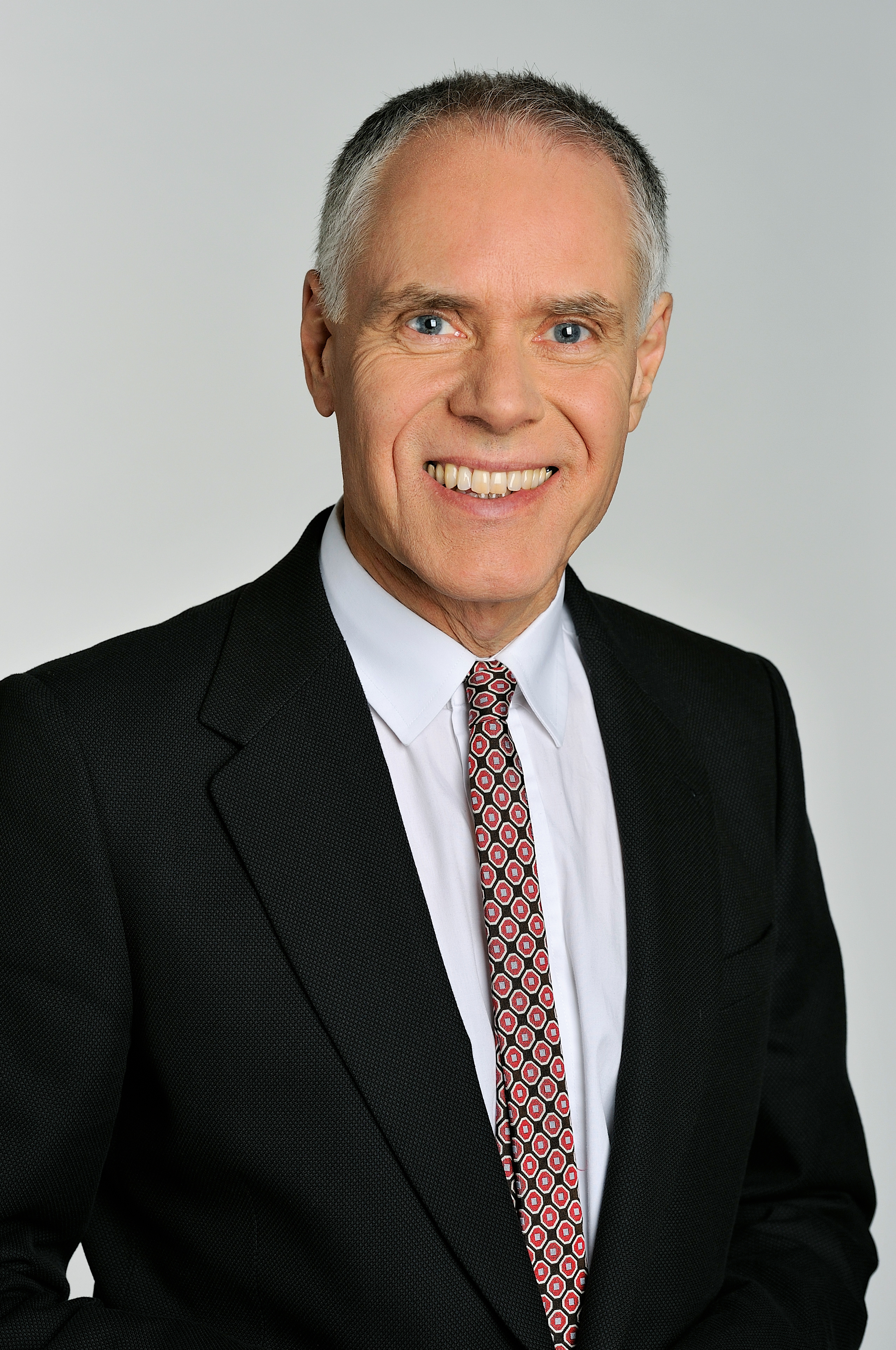

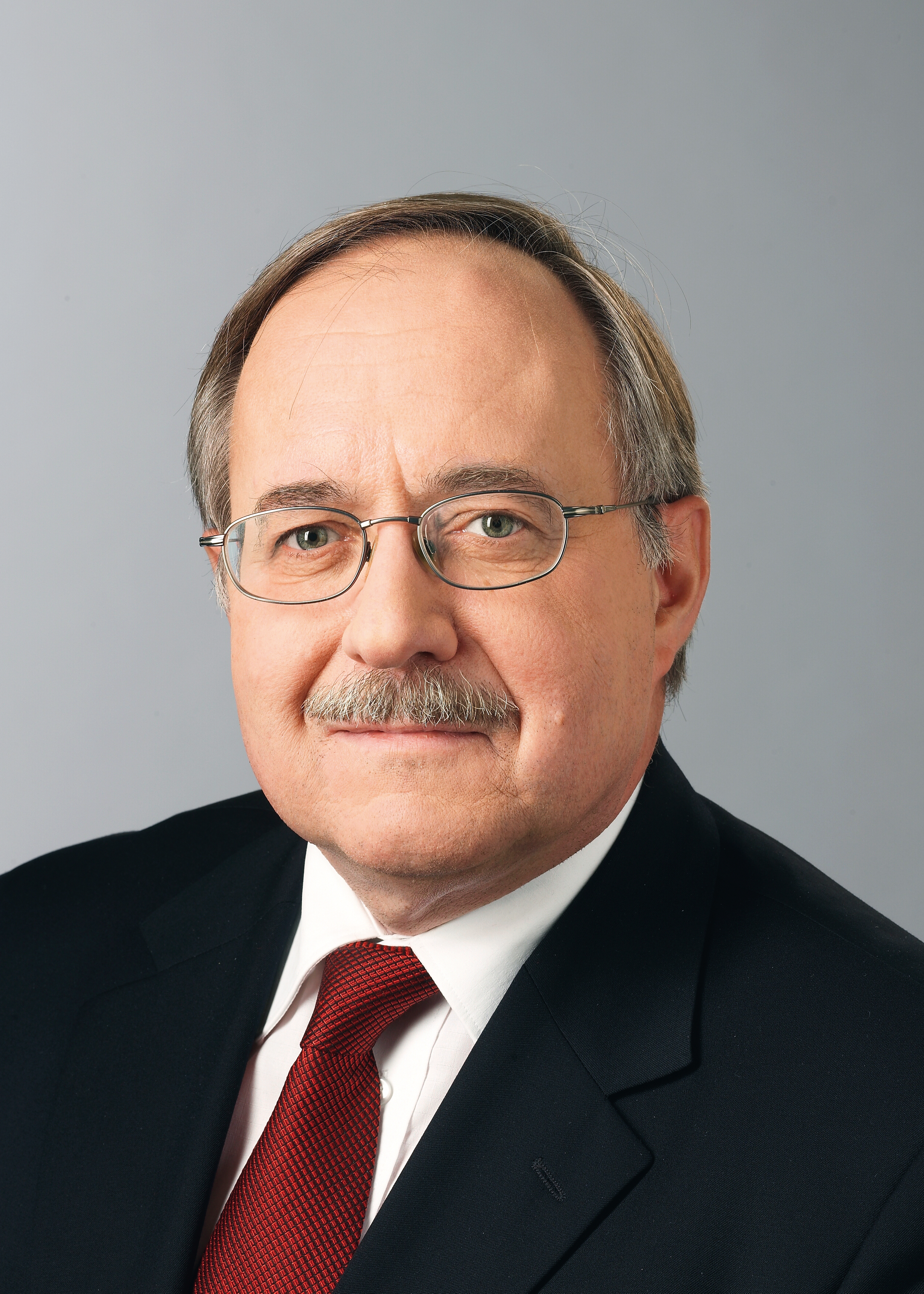

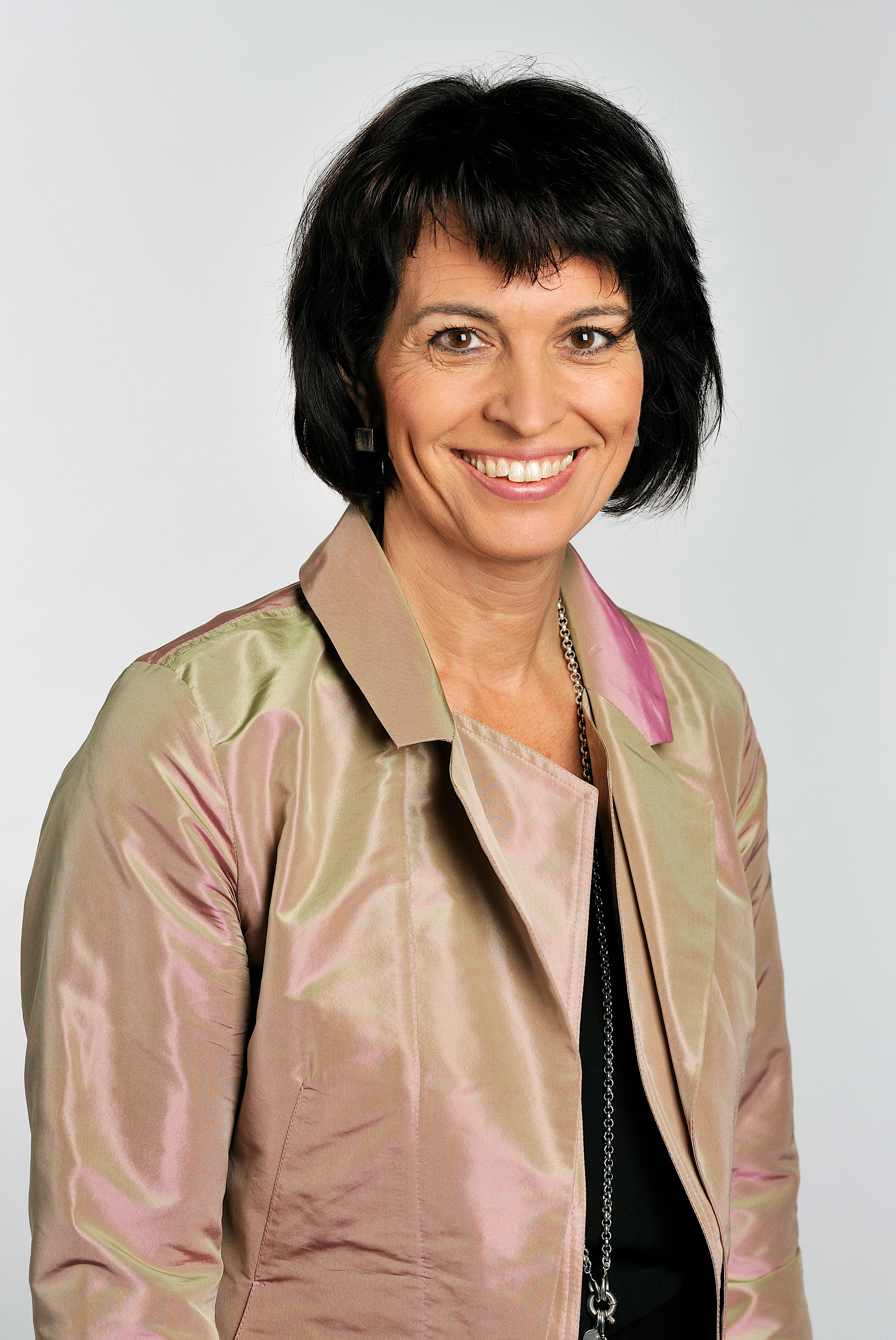
	First party	Second party
Leader	Pascal Couchepin	Moritz Leuenberger
Party	Free Democrats	Social Democrats
Seats won	2	2
Seat change	±0	±0
	Third party	Fourth party
Leader	Samuel Schmid	Doris Leuthard
Party	Swiss People's	Christian Democrats
Seats won	2	1
Seat change	±0	±0
President before election
Micheline Calmy-Rey
Social Democrats
Elected President
Pascal Couchepin
Free Democrats

On December 12, 2007, all seven members of the Swiss Federal Council stood for re-election before the United Federal Assembly for the 2008–2012 term of office. Six were re-elected; Christoph Blocher of the Swiss People's Party (SVP) was not. The Federal Assembly elected Eveline Widmer-Schlumpf in Blocher's place, who accepted her election on the following morning. Pascal Couchepin was elected President of the Swiss Confederation for 2008, and Hans-Rudolf Merz, instead of Blocher, was elected vice president of the Federal Council for 2008.

As a result of the defeat of their official candidate, Christoph Blocher, the Swiss People's Party declared itself an opposition party and excluded its nominal representatives on the Federal Council, Samuel Schmid and Eveline Widmer-Schlumpf, from its parliamentary group.

== Background ==
In the 2007 Swiss federal elections, the SVP expanded their share of votes again, mostly at the expense of the Social Democrats (SPS). Christoph Blocher, the de facto leader of the SVP, had become embroiled in a political scandal over the circumstances of the resignation of federal chief prosecutor Valentin Roschacher in 2006. However, a parliamentary oversight commission controlled by his political opponents failed to implicate him in any substantial wrongdoing. Under these circumstances, it was generally assumed that any attempt by the center-left parties in Parliament to unseat him must fail, even though Blocher had made many personal opponents with his confrontational political style.

Nonetheless, according to a reconstruction of events by the Neue Zürcher Zeitung, the Social Democrats began to plan Blocher's removal from office immediately after the elections, but obtained no clear commitment from the centrist Christian Democrats (CVP). To provoke these parties into action, the Green Party of Switzerland nominated Luc Recordon as their own candidate to run against Blocher The GPS had previously tried to obtain a seat in 1987 and 1991, when they nominated Leni Robert against the SVP's Adolf Ogi, and in 2000, when they nominated Cécile Bühlmann for Ogi's seat when he retired.

Four days before the election, the Social Democrats contacted Eveline Widmer-Schlumpf to inform her that she would probably receive a substantial number of votes. Widmer-Schlumpf reportedly did not state whether she would accept or decline her possible election. At the same time, the Christian Democratic party chief, Christophe Darbellay, publicly indicated his opposition to Blocher and hinted that he would accept if elected in his stead. On the eve of the elections, the leaders of the Social Democrats, the Greens and the Christian Democrats secretly agreed to support Widmer-Schlumpf, after a test ballot in the Christian Democratic parliamentary group indicated that a majority of the group did not support Blocher. During the night, the Greens withdrew Recordon's candidacy and the center-left party leaders sought out support among individual representatives of the Free Democrats (FDP). All the while, Widmer-Schlumpf's name was kept secret to prevent her party from exerting pressure on her and to prevent her from appearing as a candidate of the Left. Only immediately before the elections were most center-left members of parliament asked by their leadership to support Widmer-Schlumpf.

== Candidates ==
The following candidates participated in the election:

- Incumbents, in descending order of seniority:
  - Moritz Leuenberger (SPS), head of the Federal Department of Environment, Transport, Energy and Communications,
  - Pascal Couchepin (FDP), head of the Federal Department of Home Affairs,
  - Samuel Schmid (SVP), head of the Federal Department of Defence, Civil Protection and Sports,
  - Micheline Calmy-Rey (SPS), head of the Federal Department of Foreign Affairs,
  - Christoph Blocher (SVP), head of the Federal Department of Justice and Police,
  - Hans-Rudolf Merz (FDP), head of the Federal Department of Finance,
  - Doris Leuthard (CVP), head of the Federal Department of Economic Affairs.
- Other candidates:
  - Eveline Widmer-Schlumpf (SVP), a member of the government of the canton of Graubünden. She was proposed by center-left parties as an alternative candidate for the seat of Christoph Blocher, although it remains uncertain whether or not this happened with her consent.

== Results ==
Source showing only the final votes in favor of each winner:

=== Seat held by Moritz Leuenberger ===
Moritz Leuenberger was re-elected during the first ballot. His re-election was supported by all parliamentary groups except that of the SVP.

	Round 1
Moritz Leuenberger	157
Votes received by other persons	21
Votes cast	246
Invalid votes	4
Blank votes	64
Valid votes	178
Absolute majority	90

=== Seat held by Pascal Couchepin ===
Pascal Couchepin was re-elected during the first ballot. His re-election was supported by all parliamentary groups.

	Round 1
Pascal Couchepin	205
Votes received by other persons	26
Votes cast	246
Invalid votes	2
Blank votes	13
Valid votes	231
Absolute majority	116

=== Seat held by Samuel Schmid ===
Samuel Schmid was re-elected during the first ballot. His re-election was supported by all parliamentary groups.

	Round 1
Samuel Schmid	201
Votes received by other persons	18
Votes cast	244
Invalid votes	4
Blank votes	21
Valid votes	219
Absolute majority	110

=== Seat held by Micheline Calmy-Rey ===
Micheline Calmy-Rey was re-elected during the first ballot. Her re-election was supported by all parliamentary groups except that of the SVP.

	Round 1
Micheline Calmy-Rey	153
Votes received by other persons	27
Votes cast	246
Invalid votes	1
Blank votes	65
Valid votes	180
Absolute majority	91

=== Seat held by Christoph Blocher ===
Christoph Blocher's seat was the only contested seat, and this contest was the focus of the public attention directed at the elections. His re-election was officially supported only by the SVP and FDP parliamentary groups. The SVP threatened to withdraw from the government in the case of Blocher not being re-elected.

Prior to the election, the Green group proposed a candidate of their own, State councillor Luc Recordon, to contest Blocher's seat. Recordon's candidacy was withdrawn after left and centrist parties proposed to elect Eveline Widmer-Schlumpf, a centrist SVP executive councillor from the canton of Graubünden, in Blocher's stead.

Widmer-Schlumpf was elected with 125 votes in the second round. A SVP motion of order to interrupt the election until afternoon was rejected with 155 votes against. Widmer-Schlumpf declared on 13 December, 8 a.m., that she would accept her election.

	Round 1	Round 2
Christoph Blocher	111	115
Eveline Widmer-Schlumpf	116	125
Votes received by other persons	11	2
Votes cast	246	246
Invalid votes	2	0
Blank votes	6	4
Valid votes	238	242
Absolute majority	120	122

=== Seat held by Hans-Rudolf Merz ===
Hans-Rudolf Merz was re-elected during the first ballot. His re-election was supported by all parliamentary groups.

	Round 1
Hans-Rudolf Merz	213
Votes received by other persons	20
Votes cast	244
Invalid votes	3
Blank votes	8
Valid votes	233
Absolute majority	117

=== Seat held by Doris Leuthard ===
Doris Leuthard was re-elected during the first ballot. Her re-election was supported by all parliamentary groups except that of the SVP.

	Round 1
Doris Leuthard	160
Christoph Blocher	12
Votes received by other persons	19
Votes cast	244
Invalid votes	4
Blank votes	49
Valid votes	191
Absolute majority	96

=== Federal Chancellor ===
Annemarie Huber-Hotz, the chancellor between 2000 and 2007, did not seek re-election. Three candidates were presented by the parties: Corina Casanova (CVP/PDC), vice-chancellor between 2000 and 2007, Nathalie Falcone-Goumaz (SVP/UDC) and Markus Seiler (FDP/PRD). Corina Casanova was elected in the first round of voting.

	Round 1
Corina Casanova	124
Nathalie Falcone-Goumaz	64
Markus Seiler	52
Votes received by other persons	4
Votes cast	246
Invalid votes	0
Blank votes	2
Valid votes	244
Absolute majority	123

== See also ==
- List of members of the Swiss Federal Council
- 2007 Swiss federal election
