= 2008 Swiss Federal Council election =

- 10 December 2008
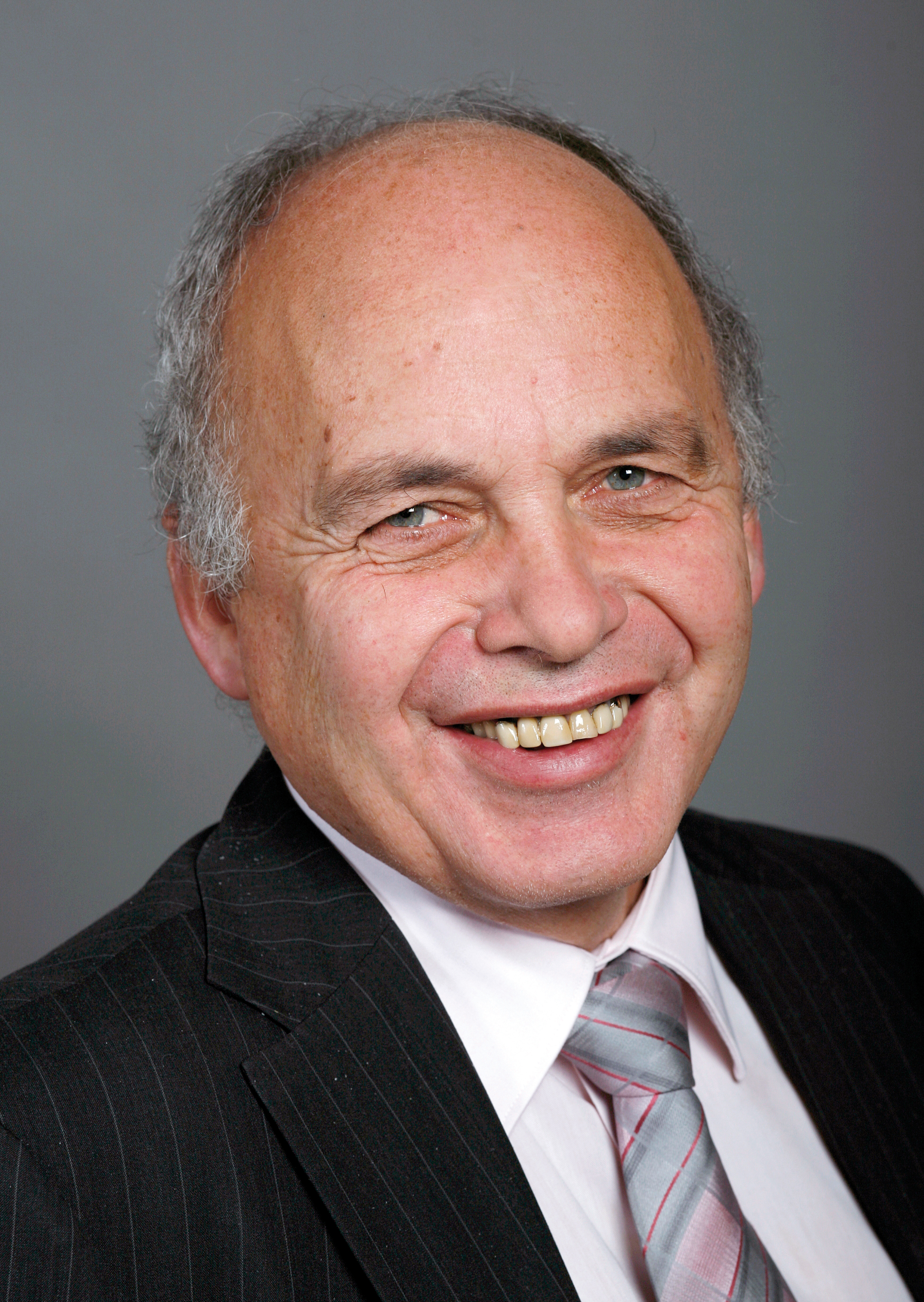

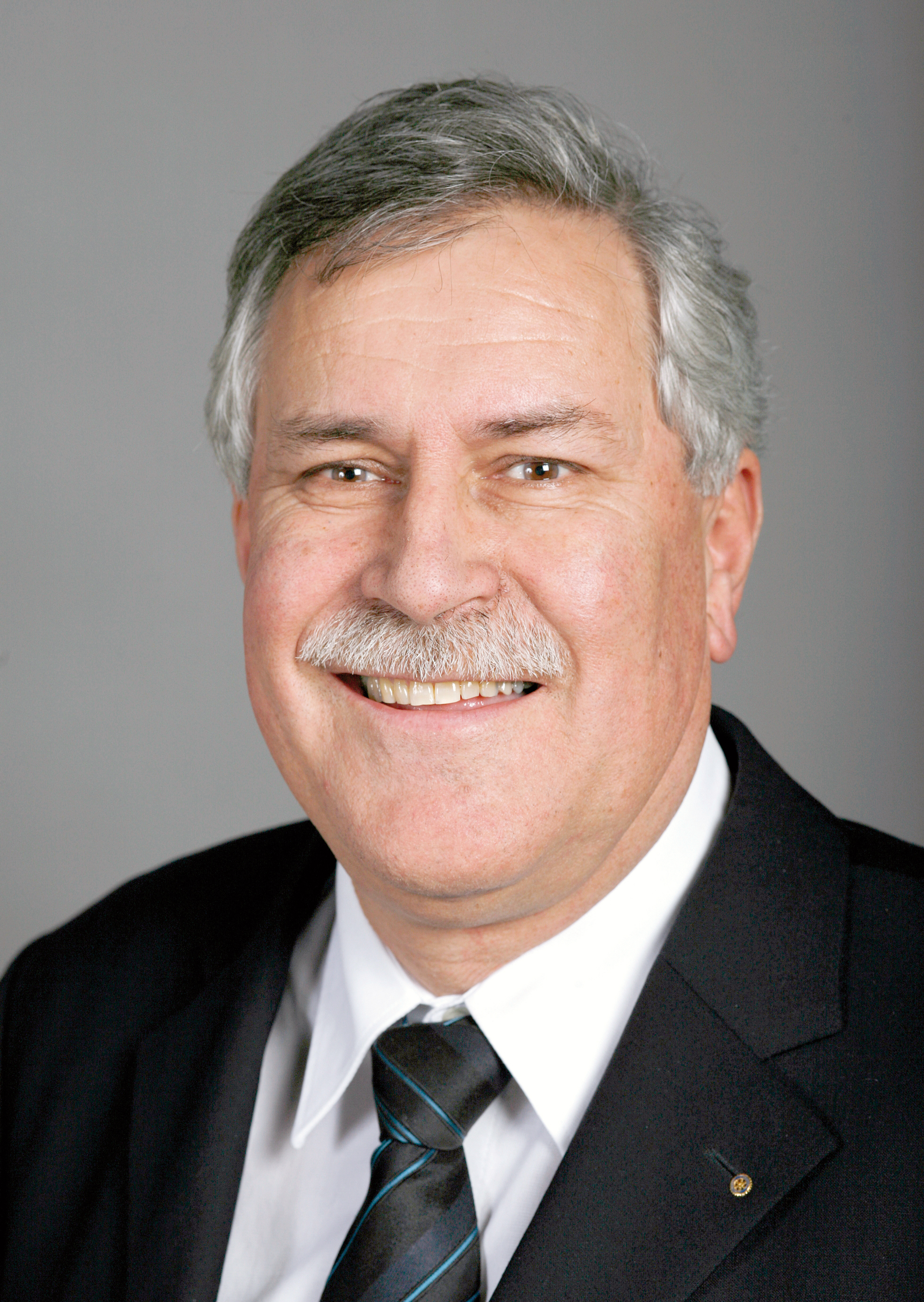
Nominee	Ueli Maurer	Hansjörg Walter
Party	Swiss People's	Swiss People's
Electoral vote	122	121
Federal Councillor before election
Samuel Schmid
BDP
Elected Federal Councillor
Ueli Maurer
Swiss People's

On 10 December 2008, the Swiss Federal Assembly elected Ueli Maurer as successor to Federal Councillor Samuel Schmid. Schmid resigned on 12 November 2008 after a number of controversies, officially citing health and personal reasons. Maurer took office on 1 January 2009.

== Candidates ==
The Swiss People's Party (SVP/UDC), Switzerland's largest party by voter share but no longer represented in the Federal Council after the 2008 split-off of Schmid's Conservative Democratic Party (BDP), claimed Schmid's seat. The other governing parties including the BDP accepted the SVP's claim and declined to field candidates of their own.

On 27 November 2008, the SVP's parliamentary group decided to nominate former Federal Councillor Christoph Blocher and former party president Ueli Maurer as candidates for Schmid's seat. Under new SVP party rules, any SVP member elected to the position without being nominated for it by the group would automatically lose his or her party membership. The opposition Green Party, citing their opposition to the SVP's policies and their representation on the Council, fielded State Councillor Luc Recordon as a candidate of their own.

All governing parties declared Blocher to be unacceptable as Federal Councillor. The center-right Free Democrats (FDP/PRD) decided to support Maurer, while the center-left Social Democrats (SP/PS) announced that they would not elect him and were looking for an alternative SVP candidate. The centrist Christian Democrats (CVP/PDC) announced on 9 December 2008 that a narrow majority of their parliamentary group, 23 MPs, would vote for Maurer

== Results ==
Prior to the first round, Hansjörg Walter, an SVP councillor from Thurgau who had previously been rumored to be the favorite of the center-left parties, announced that he would not accept an election. He nonetheless received 109 votes. Following the first round, SVP group leader Caspar Baader announced that Christoph Blocher's candidacy was withdrawn in favor of Ueli Maurer. Green Party candidate Luc Recordon, who did not receive more than ten votes in the first round, declared that he would "suspend" his candidacy.

Ueli Maurer was elected Federal Councillor on the third ballot, receiving exactly the 122 votes required.

Candidates		Round 1	Round 2	Round 3
Ueli Maurer	Ueli Maurer	67	119	122
Hansjörg Walter	Hansjörg Walter	109	121	121
Christoph Blocher	Christoph Blocher	54	unknown	–
Luc Recordon	Luc Recordon	unknown	unknown	–
Other persons		11	2	0
Ballots cast		244	244	244
Invalid ballots		1	1	0
Blank ballots		2	1	1
Valid ballots		241	242	243
Absolute majority		121	122	122
