= Erich Hess (politician) =

Swiss politician (born 1981)

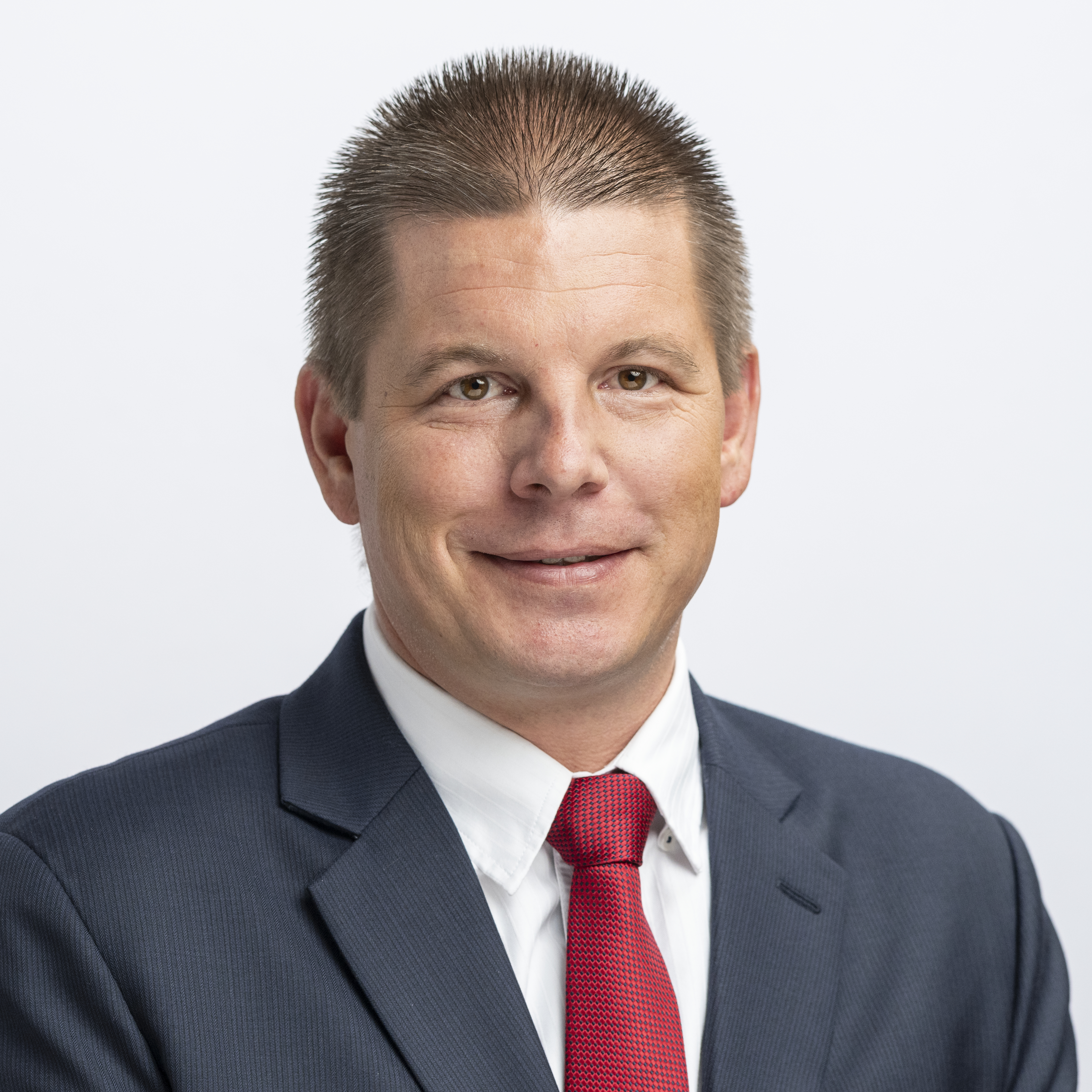
- Erich Hess (2023)

Member of the National Council (Switzerland)
- Incumbent
- Assumed office 30 November 2015

Personal details
- Born: Erich Johann Hess; 25 March 1981 (age 45) Bern, Bern, Switzerland
- Party: Swiss People's Party
- Domestic partner: Lilya Conte

Military service
- Allegiance: Switzerland
- Branch/service: Swiss Armed Forces
- Years of service: 1999–current
- Rank: Wachtmeister

Erich Johann Hess (/hɛss/ born 25 March 1981) is a Swiss businessman, truck driver and politician. Hess serves as a member of the National Council (Switzerland) for the Swiss People's Party since 2015. He served as councillor in the city council of Bern between 2005 and 2010 and is currently serving a second term. He is also a former member of the Grand Council of Bern between 2010 and 2016 and between 2018 and 2020, where he was a member on the audit and justice committees.

Further, Hess is vice president of the Swiss People's Party of Bern, executive director of the Swiss People's Party of Bern (Cantonal) and Honorary President of the Young SVP.

== Early life and education ==
Hess was born 25 March 1981 in Bern, Switzerland. He completed an apprenticeship as a truck driver and has not received any further formal education. He was often referred to represent the working class in the Swiss legislative.

== Career ==
He initially worked for about a decade as truck driver, a position he still continue to hold to this day. In 2016, Swiss newspaper Blick made public that Hess is not only a 'regular working class guy' and ventured out into real estate activities and started to refer to himself as businessman on the parliament's official website.

Hess currently is associated as controlling shareholder of several real estate companies in the Canton of Bern. Some of these ventures are together with fellow politician Thomas Fuchs, in whose ancestral home Hess is a tenant. He is a limited partner in Bern West Immobilien KMG, the only board member of Erich Hess Immobilien AG, sole owner of Immobiliengesellschaft Moserstrasse 24 AG, sole owner of Optinovum Immobilien AG, Optiviva Immobilien AG and several other consulting and trading companies.

== Politics ==
Hess served as the president of the Young SVP since 9 February 2008, before he was treasurer. He soon became a member of the executive of the Swiss People's Party in the Canton of Bern and of the party national committee. In the 2007 Swiss federal election he was ultimately suggested as a successor Samuel Schmid in the Federal Council (Switzerland).

He unsuccessfully ran for election in the 2011 Swiss federal election but was elected into National Council (Switzerland) for the Swiss People's Party in the 2015 Swiss federal election, assuming office on 30 November 2015. He was confirmed in office in the 2019 Swiss federal election.

== Personal life ==
Hess is in a relationship with Ukrainian-born Lilya Conte (b. c. 1981) and has no children. He resides in Niederbottigen, a section of Bern.
