= Metzker =

Metzker is a surname. Notable people with the surname include:

- Evany José Metzker (died 2015), Brazilian blogger and journalist
- Max Metzker (born 1960), South African-born Australian swimmer
- Ray Metzker (1931–2014), American photographer

== See also ==
- Metzner
