= Erich Hess =

Erich Hess may refer to:

- Erich Hess (gymnast)
- Erich Hess (politician)
