= Ricardo Lumengo =

Swiss politician

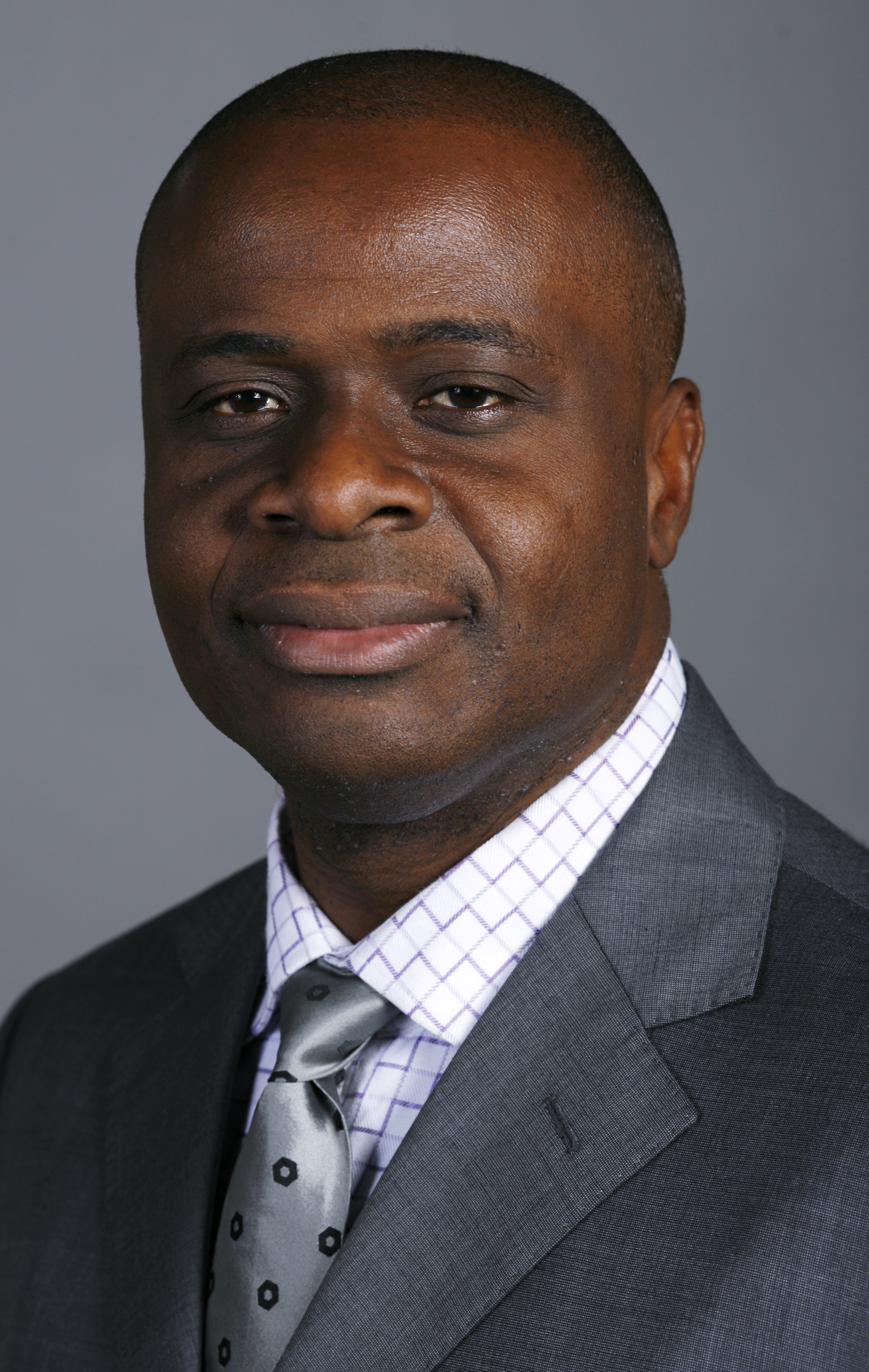
- Official portrait, 2007

Member of the National Council
- In office 3 December 2007 – 4 November 2011
- Constituency: Canton of Bern

Member of the Grand Council of Bern
- In office 2006–2007

Personal details
- Born: Ricardo Lumengo; February 22, 1962 (age 64) Lussenga, Uíge, Angola
- Citizenship: Switzerland; Angola
- Party: Social Democratic Party
- Children: 2
- Education: University of Fribourg (Licentiate)
- Occupation: Attorney, advisor and former politician

Ricardo Lumengo (born 22 February 1962) is a Swiss lawyer and politician. He previously served as a member of the National Council for the Social Democratic Party. Lumengo previously served on the Grand Council of Bern between 2006 and 2007. He was the first ever of black ethnicity to serve in the Federal Assembly.

== Early life and education ==
Ricardo Lumengo grew up in Angola, he fled his homeland in 1982 at the age of 20 years. He came to Switzerland, where he asked for asylum. After a few years, he obtained a residence permit and in 1997 he became a Swiss citizen. He lives in Biel since 1997. Lumengo speaks French, German, Portuguese, English, Spanish and Bantu languages such as Kikongo, Kikongo ya Leta and Lingala. He studied law at the University of Fribourg and worked as a legal adviser at the center of intercultural encounter Multimondo in Bienne.

== Politics ==
Lumengo was elected to the Biel municipal council in 2004, and in 2006 to the cantonal council of Berne.

In the 2007 federal election, he was elected to the Swiss National Council, as the country's first national councillor of African origin (although there had been a councillor of mixed Swiss-African ancestry before: Tilo Frey, served 1971–1975), and the first former asylum seeker to be elected into the council.

As highlights of his political commitment, we have particularly the fight against unemployment, the struggle for social justice and commitment to the rights of foreigners. He has acted for the involvement of people of foreign origin in public administration under the sign of the UN Convention against Racial Discrimination to which Switzerland adhered in 1994.

However Lumengo faced many racist attacks from his political opponents during his political career. He received particularly violent insults from the direction of the right-wing extremist party, Swiss Freedom Party (PSL), in 2006. Therefore, his opponents made use of Cybersquatting and had registered the domain "lumengo.ch" to build a fake "Lumengo webpage" containing racist statements. After a judge's decision, the domain remained under the possession and power of the PSL, but could not be diverted to this party. Visitors to this site were faced to a completely black and empty page. After some years, his political opponents have opened again the website to publish insults toward him.

Since his election to the National Council Lumengo has repeatedly been the victim of racist attacks, such as in 2008 during his speech on May 1 in Langenthal where an unidentified person threw bananas at him. In October of the same year, he was insulted by a member of PNOS (Partei National Orientierter Schweizer) from the party website with a contemptible text and a racist caricature. Lumengo generally receives letters with racist insults after each media appearance.

On 19 February 2010, Lumengo was investigated for voting irregularities. While admitting to helping voters fill in their ballot papers in 2006, he rejected all accusations of trying to falsify the results. Instead, he appealed the verdict and left the Social Democratic Party, announcing he would retain his seat in the National Council as an independent politician. In the second instance on May 18, 2011, Lumengo was acquitted by the High Court of the Canton of Berne. In February 2012, the Federal Court which is the highest judicial authority of the Swiss Confederation, confirmed Lumengo's verdict of not guilty. Lumengo is finally acquitted of voting irregularities.

Alongside his political activities marked by the defense of human rights, support for the integration of foreigners in Switzerland and the fight against racism, Ricardo Lumengo is currently committed to renewing ties with the African continent particularly with his country of origin, Angola, in order to benefit not only the political class but also civil society from his professional and political experience acquired in Switzerland. Ricardo Lumengo hopes so to make his contribution for the strengthening of democratic institutions and good governance.

== Personal life ==
He is currently unmarried and the father of two children
