= Mers =

Mers may refer to:

- MERS, Middle East respiratory syndrome
  - Middle East respiratory syndrome–related coronavirus (MERS-CoV), the virus that causes MERS
- El Mers, a town in Morocco
- Mer (community) or Maher community, an Indian social group
- Mers-les-Bains, a town in France
- Mortgage Electronic Registration Systems, an American company

== See also ==
- Metro Ethernet Routing Switch 8600 (MERS 8600)
- Middle East respiratory syndrome outbreak (disambiguation)
- Mer (disambiguation)
- Merz (disambiguation)
- Murs (disambiguation)
