= Murs =

Murs may refer to:

== People ==
- Marc Athanase Parfait Œillet des Murs (1804-1878), French ornithologist
- Olly Murs (born 1984), English singer-songwriter
- Murs (rapper) (born 1978), American rapper

== Places ==
- Murs, Indre, France
- Murs, Vaucluse, France
- Murs-et-Gélignieux, Ain département, France
- Mûrs-Erigné, Maine-et-Loire département, France
- archaic name of Moers, Germany

== Other uses ==
- Multi-Use Radio Service (MURS)
- Mur Murs, a 1981 documentary film directed by Agnès Varda

== See also ==
- Mers (disambiguation)
- Merz (disambiguation)
- Mur (disambiguation)
