= Metzner =

Metzner is a German surname, which may have formed from the German word metze, a small dry-measure for grain, or metzjen, the occupational name for a butcher. It is also a habitational name that stems Metz from Lorraine, typically a Jewish name, and from Metzen in Lower Bavaria. The origin of the surname has led to various other related spellings.

Notable people with the surname include:

- Arthur B. Metzner (1927–2006), Canada-born American chemical engineering professor and rheologist
- Carroll Metzner (1919–2008), American politician
- Charles Miller Metzner (1912–2009), American judge
- Ernő Metzner (1892–1953), Hungarian-born film director and production designer
- Franz Metzner (1870–1919), German sculptor
- Helmut Metzner (1925–1999), German plant physiologist
- Karl-Heinz Metzner (1923–1994), German footballer
- Olivier Metzner (1949–2013), French criminal defense lawyer
- Ralph Metzner (1936–2019), German-born American psychologist, writer and researcher
- Sheila Metzner (born 1939), American photographer

== See also ==
- "Shell-Metzner", incorrectly attributed naming of "Shell sort", a sorting algorithm
- Mertz, an origin-related spelling of Metzner

== Sources ==
- Hanks, Patrick (2003). Dictionary of American Family Names. Oxford University Press. ISBN 0-19-508137-4.
