= MRZ (disambiguation) =

The Machine Readable Zone is part of a machine-readable passport.

MRZ may also refer to:

- Marind language, ISO 639-3 code
- Moree Airport, IATA code
- Međuopštinske regionalne zajednice, a historical administrative division of Serbia
- Mrz, abbreviation of the month of March in Austria, Germany, and Switzerland date and time notation
- MRZ reaction, combined reaction to Measles, Rubella and Zoster viruses

== See also ==
- 1mrz, SCOPE and SUPERFAMILY codes for riboflavin kinase
- Merz (disambiguation)
- MRS (disambiguation)
- MR (disambiguation)
- RZ (disambiguation)
