= 2007 Swiss federal election =

- 21 October 2007
- All 200 seats in the National Council (101 seats needed for a majority); All 46 seats in the Council of States (24 seats needed for a majority)
- Turnout: 48.3% ▲3.1 pp
Party	Leader	Vote %	Seats	+/–
National Council
Swiss People's	Ueli Maurer	28.9%	62	+7
Social Democrats	Hans-Jürg Fehr	19.5%	43	−9
Free Democrats	Fulvio Pelli	15.8%	31	−5
Christian Democrats	Christophe Darbellay	14.5%	31	+3
Greens	Ruth Genner	9.6%	20	+7
Liberals	Claude Ruey	1.9%	4	0
Green Liberals	Martin Bäumle	1.4%	3	New
Evangelical People's	Ruedi Aeschbacher	2.4%	2	−1
Federal Democrats	Hans Moser	1.3%	1	−1
Labour		0.7%	1	−1
Ticino League	Giuliano Bignasca	0.6%	1	0
Christian Social	Monika Bloch Süss	0.4%	1	0
Council of States
Christian Democrats			15	0
Free Democrats			12	−2
Social Democrats			9	0
Swiss People's			7	−1
Greens			2	+2
Green Liberals			1	+1
This lists parties that won seats. See the complete results below.
Map of Swiss cantons colored by the party that won the most votes. The seats that were won in the cantons for both the National Council and the Council of States are shown as well.

Elections to the Swiss Federal Assembly, the federal parliament of Switzerland, were held on Sunday, 21 October 2007. In a few cantons, a second round of the elections to the Council of States was held on 11 November, 18 November, and 25 November 2007. For the 48th legislative term of the federal parliament (2007–2011), voters in 26 cantons elected all 200 members of the National Council as well as 43 out of 46 members of the Council of States. The other three members of the Council of States for that term of service were elected at an earlier date.

On 12 December 2007, the newly elected legislature elected the Swiss federal government, the Swiss Federal Council, for a four-year-term.

The results reflected yet another rise in support for the strongest party, the right-wing populist Swiss People's Party, at 29% of the popular vote, and the growth of the Green and Green Liberal parties at the expense of the Social Democrats.

== National Council ==
The Swiss People's Party successfully came out of the election as the strongest party, rising another 2.3% to 29.0% of the popular vote. Among the left-wing parties, support of the Social Democrats eroded to the benefit of the Green and Green Liberal parties.

The right-wing parties won 64 seats made up of the SVP with 62 seats and a single seat of the Christian right Federal Democratic Union and the regional Ticino League respectively. The left-wing parties won 65 seats, with 43 of the Social Democrats, 20 of the Green party, and the Christian-left Christian Social Party and the far-left Labour Party with a single seat each. The centrist parties won 71 seats, with the CVP and the centre-right FDP each having won 31 seats, and the remaining 9 seats won by minor parties: Liberals, 4 seats; Green Liberals, 3 seats; Evangelical People's Party, 2 seats.

59 of 200 seats (29.5%) were won by women, as compared to 50 in 2003. Ricardo Lumengo (Social Democrats, born in Angola) is notable as the first black Swiss national councillor. 23 incumbents did not get re-elected and lost their mandate, among them Zürich right wing politician Ulrich Schlüer (SVP). The turnout of the election was 48,9% a rise of 3,7% from the previous elections in 2003.

=== Results ===
Party	Votes	%	Seats	+/–
Swiss People's Party	666,318	28.59	62	+7
Social Democratic Party	450,116	19.32	43	–9
Free Democratic Party	361,103	15.50	31	–5
Christian Democratic People's Party	332,920	14.29	31	+3
Green Party	220,785	9.47	20	+7
Evangelical People's Party	56,361	2.42	2	–1
Green Liberal Party	49,314	2.12	3	New
Liberal Party	42,356	1.82	4	0
Federal Democratic Union	29,548	1.27	1	–1
Swiss Party of Labour	16,649	0.71	1	–1
Ticino League	13,031	0.56	1	0
Christian Social Party	9,985	0.43	1	0
Others	81,897	3.51	0	–
Total	2,330,383	100.00	200	0
Valid votes	2,330,383	98.20		
Invalid/blank votes	42,688	1.80		
Total votes	2,373,071	100.00		
Registered voters/turnout	4,915,563	48.28		
Source: Nohlen & Stöver

==== By constituency ====
Constituency	Seats	Electorate	Turnout	Party	Votes	Seats won
Aargau	15	380,189	186,551	Swiss People's Party	942,792	6
Aargau	15	380,189	186,551	Social Democratic Party	465,119	3
Aargau	15	380,189	186,551	Free Democratic Party	354,366	2
Aargau	15	380,189	186,551	Christian Democratic People's Party	351,915	3
Aargau	15	380,189	186,551	Green Party	211,343	1
Aargau	15	380,189	186,551	Evangelical People's Party	110,702	0
Aargau	15	380,189	186,551	Liberal Center Forum	107,256	0
Aargau	15	380,189	186,551	Federal Democratic Union	30,222	0
Aargau	15	380,189	186,551	Swiss Democrats	17,287	0
Aargau	15	380,189	186,551	Family Party	6,319	0
Appenzell Ausserrhoden	1	36,990	12,332	Free Democratic Party	7,780	1
Appenzell Ausserrhoden	1	36,990	12,332	Others	3,029	0
Appenzell Innerrhoden	1	10,901	2,300	Christian Democratic People's Party	1,736	1
Appenzell Innerrhoden	1	10,901	2,300	Others	317	0
Basel-Landschaft	7	183,917	92,083	Swiss People's Party	177,852	2
Basel-Landschaft	7	183,917	92,083	Social Democratic Party	157,008	2
Basel-Landschaft	7	183,917	92,083	Free Democratic Party	106,081	1
Basel-Landschaft	7	183,917	92,083	Green Party	85,854	1
Basel-Landschaft	7	183,917	92,083	Christian Democratic People's Party	71,063	1
Basel-Landschaft	7	183,917	92,083	Evangelical People's Party	17,364	0
Basel-Landschaft	7	183,917	92,083	Swiss Democrats	4,987	0
Basel-Landschaft	7	183,917	92,083	Federal Democratic Union	2,948	0
Basel-Stadt	5	113,890	60,817	Social Democratic Party	102,522	2
Basel-Stadt	5	113,890	60,817	Swiss People's Party	53,832	1
Basel-Stadt	5	113,890	60,817	Green Party	35,301	1
Basel-Stadt	5	113,890	60,817	Free Democratic Party	33,073	1
Basel-Stadt	5	113,890	60,817	Liberal Party	23,325	0
Basel-Stadt	5	113,890	60,817	Christian Democratic People's Party	21,494	0
Basel-Stadt	5	113,890	60,817	Evangelical People's Party	10,406	0
Basel-Stadt	5	113,890	60,817	People's Action	4,262	0
Basel-Stadt	5	113,890	60,817	Swiss Democrats	2,000	0
Basel-Stadt	5	113,890	60,817	Federal Democratic Union	1,463	0
Basel-Stadt	5	113,890	60,817	Citizens' Party	557	0
Bern	26	700,435	325,042	Swiss People's Party	2,781,616	10
Bern	26	700,435	325,042	Social Democratic Party	1,754,359	6
Bern	26	700,435	325,042	Free Democratic Party	1,252,001	4
Bern	26	700,435	325,042	Green Party	1,067,741	3
Bern	26	700,435	325,042	Evangelical People's Party	450,506	1
Bern	26	700,435	325,042	Christian Democratic People's Party	305,392	1
Bern	26	700,435	325,042	Federal Democratic Union	294,168	1
Bern	26	700,435	325,042	Swiss Democrats	127,106	0
Bern	26	700,435	325,042	Liberal Socialists	87,980	0
Bern	26	700,435	325,042	Independent Health Party	69,540	0
Bern	26	700,435	325,042	Freedom Party	51,017	0
Bern	26	700,435	325,042	Men's Party	18,299	0
Bern	26	700,435	325,042	Interest Group Against Mismanagement	15,987	0
Bern	26	700,435	325,042	Jörg Stettler	6,675	0
Fribourg	7	173,530	83,216	Christian Democratic People's Party	140,154	2
Fribourg	7	173,530	83,216	Social Democratic Party	128,576	2
Fribourg	7	173,530	83,216	Swiss People's Party	124,683	1
Fribourg	7	173,530	83,216	Free Democratic Party	78,220	1
Fribourg	7	173,530	83,216	Christian Social Party	40,185	1
Fribourg	7	173,530	83,216	Green Party	35,819	0
Fribourg	7	173,530	83,216	Free List	6,012	0
Fribourg	7	173,530	83,216	Federal Democratic Union	4,972	0
Fribourg	7	173,530	83,216	Evangelical People's Party	4,349	0
Fribourg	7	173,530	83,216	For More Logic in Politics	1,589	0
Fribourg	7	173,530	83,216	Independent Citizens' Movement	1,349	0
Geneva	11	232,572	110,376	Swiss People's Party	245,239	2
Geneva	11	232,572	110,376	Social Democratic Party	222,531	3
Geneva	11	232,572	110,376	Green Party	190,735	2
Geneva	11	232,572	110,376	Liberal Party	172,132	2
Geneva	11	232,572	110,376	Christian Democratic People's Party	112,993	1
Geneva	11	232,572	110,376	Free Democratic Party	90,219	1
Geneva	11	232,572	110,376	Solidarity	57,021	0
Geneva	11	232,572	110,376	Citizens' Movement	29,205	0
Geneva	11	232,572	110,376	Party of Labour	21,689	0
Geneva	11	232,572	110,376	Evangelical People's Party	13,909	0
Geneva	11	232,572	110,376	The Communists	8,626	0
Glarus	1	25,550	8,326	Social Democratic Party	4,292	1
Glarus	1	25,550	8,326	Swiss People's Party	2,712	0
Glarus	1	25,550	8,326	Others	723	0
Grisons	5	132,200	55,331	Swiss People's Party	92,036	2
Grisons	5	132,200	55,331	Social Democratic Party	62,828	1
Grisons	5	132,200	55,331	Christian Democratic People's Party	53,911	1
Grisons	5	132,200	55,331	Free Democratic Party	50,759	1
Grisons	5	132,200	55,331	Federal Democratic Union	4,137	0
Grisons	5	132,200	55,331	Daniel Trappitsch	1,525	0
Jura	2	49,571	22,109	Social Democratic Party	15,803	1
Jura	2	49,571	22,109	Christian Democratic People's Party	10,695	0
Jura	2	49,571	22,109	Swiss People's Party	5,855	1
Jura	2	49,571	22,109	Free Democratic Party	5,713	0
Jura	2	49,571	22,109	Christian Social Party	4,737	0
Lucerne	10	247,330	131,062	Christian Democratic People's Party	385,819	3
Lucerne	10	247,330	131,062	Swiss People's Party	322,633	3
Lucerne	10	247,330	131,062	Free Democratic Party	278,480	2
Lucerne	10	247,330	131,062	Social Democratic Party	146,671	1
Lucerne	10	247,330	131,062	Green Party	120,797	1
Lucerne	10	247,330	131,062	CHance21	12,694	0
Lucerne	10	247,330	131,062	Evangelical People's Party	9,559	0
Neuchâtel	5	107,147	53,816	Social Democratic Party	67,591	1
Neuchâtel	5	107,147	53,816	Swiss People's Party	60,446	1
Neuchâtel	5	107,147	53,816	Liberal Party	34,470	1
Neuchâtel	5	107,147	53,816	Free Democratic Party	33,126	1
Neuchâtel	5	107,147	53,816	Green Party	24,481	1
Neuchâtel	5	107,147	53,816	Party of Labour	23,914	0
Neuchâtel	5	107,147	53,816	Christian Democratic People's Party	8,731	0
Neuchâtel	5	107,147	53,816	Green Liberal Party	4,073	0
Neuchâtel	5	107,147	53,816	Evangelical People's Party	3,209	0
Neuchâtel	5	107,147	53,816	Free and Independent Party	740	0
Nidwalden	1	Elected unopposed		Free Democratic Party		1
Obwalden	1	23,903	14,274	Swiss People's Party	4,523	1
Obwalden	1	23,903	14,274	Christian Democratic People's Party	4,462	0
Obwalden	1	23,903	14,274	Lukas Gasser	3,095	0
Obwalden	1	23,903	14,274	Social Democratic Party	1,589	0
Obwalden	1	23,903	14,274	Others	60	0
Schaffhausen	2	48,685	31,815	Swiss People's Party	23,860	1
Schaffhausen	2	48,685	31,815	Social Democratic Party	20,885	1
Schaffhausen	2	48,685	31,815	Free Democratic Party	16,288	0
Schwyz	4	94,048	49,198	Swiss People's Party	84,324	2
Schwyz	4	94,048	49,198	Christian Democratic People's Party	37,697	1
Schwyz	4	94,048	49,198	Free Democratic Party	31,375	0
Schwyz	4	94,048	49,198	Social Democratic Party	26,092	1
Schwyz	4	94,048	49,198	Green Party	6,284	0
Schwyz	4	94,048	49,198	Evangelical People's Party	1,771	0
Solothurn	7	168,927	85,668	Swiss People's Party	158,321	2
Solothurn	7	168,927	85,668	Free Democratic Party	122,435	1
Solothurn	7	168,927	85,668	Christian Democratic People's Party	118,979	2
Solothurn	7	168,927	85,668	Social Democratic Party	113,697	1
Solothurn	7	168,927	85,668	Green Party	58,338	1
Solothurn	7	168,927	85,668	Evangelical People's Party	10,313	0
Solothurn	7	168,927	85,668	Swiss Democrats	2,232	0
St. Gallen	12	300,034	140,365	Swiss People's Party	605,670	5
St. Gallen	12	300,034	140,365	Christian Democratic People's Party	352,902	3
St. Gallen	12	300,034	140,365	Social Democratic Party	242,580	2
St. Gallen	12	300,034	140,365	Free Democratic Party	224,477	1
St. Gallen	12	300,034	140,365	Green Party	104,572	1
St. Gallen	12	300,034	140,365	Evangelical People's Party	33,542	0
St. Gallen	12	300,034	140,365	Federal Democratic Union	16,249	0
St. Gallen	12	300,034	140,365	Swiss Democrats	10,937	0
St. Gallen	12	300,034	140,365	For Children and the Youth	6,995	0
St. Gallen	12	300,034	140,365	Animal Welfare is Human Protection	5,984	0
St. Gallen	12	300,034	140,365	Catholic People's Party	3,867	0
St. Gallen	12	300,034	140,365	For Independent Ideas and Solutions in Politics	2,724	0
St. Gallen	12	300,034	140,365	The East Swiss Party	461	0
Ticino	8	205,754	97,428	Free Democratic Party	208,633	3
Ticino	8	205,754	97,428	Christian Democratic People's Party	179,055	2
Ticino	8	205,754	97,428	Social Democratic Party	134,378	2
Ticino	8	205,754	97,428	Ticino League	104,249	1
Ticino	8	205,754	97,428	Swiss People's Party	64,907	0
Ticino	8	205,754	97,428	Green Party	35,656	0
Ticino	8	205,754	97,428	Party of Labour	9,411	0
Ticino	8	205,754	97,428	Humanist Party	4,755	0
Ticino	8	205,754	97,428	The Liberalists	1,051	0
Thurgau	6	153,214	71,849	Swiss People's Party	177,039	3
Thurgau	6	153,214	71,849	Christian Democratic People's Party	63,524	1
Thurgau	6	153,214	71,849	Free Democratic Party	50,575	1
Thurgau	6	153,214	71,849	Social Democratic Party	48,826	1
Thurgau	6	153,214	71,849	Green Party	42,778	0
Thurgau	6	153,214	71,849	Evangelical People's Party	11,839	0
Thurgau	6	153,214	71,849	Federal Democratic Union	10,975	0
Thurgau	6	153,214	71,849	Swiss Democrats	7,964	0
Thurgau	6	153,214	71,849	Alternative List	2,970	0
Thurgau	6	153,214	71,849	Catholic People's Party	1,590	0
Uri	1	25,712	6,206	Free Democratic Party	4,527	1
Uri	1	25,712	6,206	Others	661	0
Vaud	18	389,191	183,426	Swiss People's Party	666,818	5
Vaud	18	389,191	183,426	Social Democratic Party	654,769	4
Vaud	18	389,191	183,426	Free Democratic Party	433,474	3
Vaud	18	389,191	183,426	Green Party	424,705	3
Vaud	18	389,191	183,426	Liberal Party	240,348	1
Vaud	18	389,191	183,426	Christian Democratic People's Party	166,881	1
Vaud	18	389,191	183,426	Party of Labour	140,024	1
Vaud	18	389,191	183,426	Green Liberal Party	109,174	0
Vaud	18	389,191	183,426	Solidarity	62,742	0
Vaud	18	389,191	183,426	Federal Democratic Union	37,438	0
Vaud	18	389,191	183,426	Evangelical People's Party	32,380	0
Vaud	18	389,191	183,426	Swiss Democrats	7,416	0
Valais	7	196,984	117,833	Christian Democratic People's Party	286,809	4
Valais	7	196,984	117,833	Swiss People's Party	129,306	1
Valais	7	196,984	117,833	Free Democratic Party	124,626	1
Valais	7	196,984	117,833	Social Democratic Party	114,613	1
Valais	7	196,984	117,833	Christian Social Party	62,522	0
Valais	7	196,984	117,833	Green Party	30,670	0
Valais	7	196,984	117,833	Liberal Party	7,853	0
Valais	7	196,984	117,833	Green Liberal Party	7,753	0
Valais	7	196,984	117,833	Alternative List	3,985	0
Valais	7	196,984	117,833	Citizens' Movement	2,037	0
Zug	3	70,478	37,864	Swiss People's Party	31,288	1
Zug	3	70,478	37,864	Christian Democratic People's Party	25,074	1
Zug	3	70,478	37,864	Free Democratic Party	23,132	0
Zug	3	70,478	37,864	Alternative Kanton Zug	18,285	1
Zug	3	70,478	37,864	Social Democratic Party	9,763	0
Zürich	34	844,381	413,454	Swiss People's Party	4,738,494	12
Zürich	34	844,381	413,454	Social Democratic Party	2,767,366	7
Zürich	34	844,381	413,454	Free Democratic Party	1,837,851	4
Zürich	34	844,381	413,454	Green Party	1,448,189	4
Zürich	34	844,381	413,454	Christian Democratic People's Party	1,055,571	3
Zürich	34	844,381	413,454	Green Liberal Party	979,377	3
Zürich	34	844,381	413,454	Evangelical People's Party	514,285	1
Zürich	34	844,381	413,454	Federal Democratic Union	295,976	0
Zürich	34	844,381	413,454	Alternative List	155,798	0
Zürich	34	844,381	413,454	Swiss Democrats	75,477	0
Zürich	34	844,381	413,454	Party of Labour	31,919	0
Zürich	34	844,381	413,454	Hanf Ueli	21,444	0
Zürich	34	844,381	413,454	Christian Social Party	20,541	0
Zürich	34	844,381	413,454	Freedom Party	11,236	0
Zürich	34	844,381	413,454	Humanist Party	9,512	0
Zürich	34	844,381	413,454	Marian Danowski	7,757	0
Source: Bundesblatt, 27 November 2007

== Council of States ==
Contrary to the developments in the National Council, the Council of States remains dominated by the traditional centrist parties FDP and CVP. Robert Cramer (Geneva) is the first member of the Green Party to be elected to the Council of States, joined in the second round by Luc Recordon of Vaud. Verena Diener (Zurich), formerly of the Green Party, wins a Council of States seat for the newly founded Green Liberal Party. Christine Egerszegi of Aargau (FDP) is the first woman councillor elected in that canton.

Party	Seats	+/–
Christian Democratic People's Party	15	0
Free Democratic Party	12	–2
Social Democratic Party	9	0
Swiss People's Party	7	–1
Green Party	2	+2
Green Liberal Party	1	+1
Total	46	0
Source: Nohlen & Stöver

=== By canton ===
Canton	Seat 1	Party	Seat 2	Party
Zurich	Felix Gutzwiller	Free Democrats	Verena Diener	Green Liberals
Bern	Simonetta Sommaruga *	Social Democrats	Werner Luginbühl	Swiss People's Party
Lucerne	Helen Leumann-Würsch *	Free Democrats	Konrad Graber	Christian Democrats
Uri	Hansruedi Stadler *	Christian Democrats	Hansheiri Inderkum *	Christian Democrats
Schwyz	Alex Kuprecht *	Swiss People's Party	Bruno Frick *	Christian Democrats
Obwalden	Hans Hess *	Free Democrats	N/A	
Nidwalden	Paul Niederberger	Christian Democrats	N/A	
Glarus	Franz Schiesser *	Free Democrats	This Jenny *	Swiss People's Party
Zug	Peter Bieri *	Christian Democrats	Rolf Schweiger *	Free Democrats
Fribourg	Urs Schwaller *	Christian Democrats	Alain Berset *	Social Democrats
Solothurn	Rolf Büttiker *	Free Democrats	Ernst Leuenberger *	Social Democrats
Basel-Stadt	Anita Fetz *	Social Democrats	N/A	
Basel-Landschaft	Claude Janiak	Social Democrats	N/A	
Schaffhausen	Peter Briner *	Free Democrats	Hannes Germann *	Swiss People's Party
Appenzell AI	Ivo Bischofberger	Christian Democrats	N/A	
Appenzell AR	Hans Altherr *	Free Democrats	N/A	
St. Gallen	Erika Forster *	Free Democrats	Eugen David *	Christian Democrats
Graubünden	Christoffel Brändli *	Swiss People's Party	Theo Maissen *	Christian Democrats
Aargau	Christine Egerszegi	Free Democrats	Maximilian Reimann *	Swiss People's Party
Thurgau	Philipp Stähelin *	Christian Democrats	Hermann Bürgi *	Swiss People's Party
Ticino	Dick Marty *	Free Democrats	Filippo Lombardi *	Christian Democrats
Vaud	Géraldine Savary	Social Democrats	Luc Recordon	Greens
Valais	Jean-René Fournier	Christian Democrats	René Imoberdorf	Christian Democrats
Neuchâtel	Didier Burkhalter	Free Democrats	Gisèle Ory *	Social Democrats
Geneva	Liliane Maury Pasquier	Social Democrats	Robert Cramer	Greens
Jura	Claude Hêche	Social Democrats	Anne Seydoux-Christe	Christian Democrats
* indicates a candidate that was re-elected.

== Bibliography ==
- "Political Map of Switzerland" "Hermann, M. und Leuthold, H. (2003): Die politische Landkarte des Nationalrats 1999-2003. In: Tages-Anzeiger, 11. Oktober, 2003, Zürich."
- Swiss Federal Statistical Office (3 December 2007). "Nationalratswahlen 2007. Der Wandel der Parteienlandschaft seit 1971". Archived from the original on 18 May 2008.
