= Eveline Widmer-Schlumpf =

92nd President of the Swiss Confederation

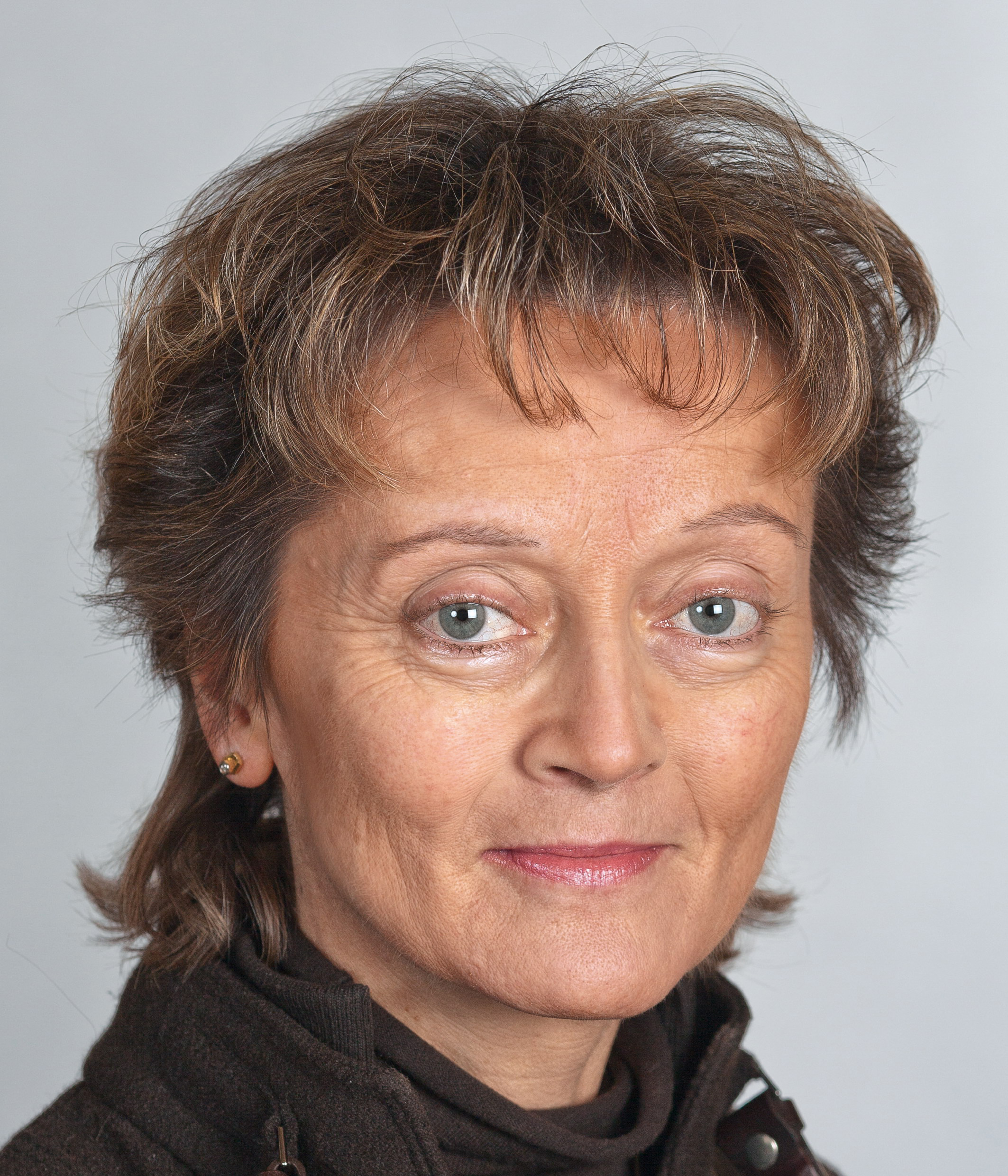
- Official portrait, 2011

President of Switzerland
- In office 1 January 2012 – 31 December 2012
- Vice President: Ueli Maurer
- Preceded by: Micheline Calmy-Rey
- Succeeded by: Ueli Maurer

Vice President of Switzerland
- In office 1 January 2011 – 31 December 2011
- President: Micheline Calmy-Rey
- Preceded by: Micheline Calmy-Rey
- Succeeded by: Ueli Maurer

Head of the Department of Finance
- In office 1 November 2010 – 31 December 2015
- Preceded by: Hans-Rudolf Merz
- Succeeded by: Ueli Maurer

Head of the Department of Justice and Police
- In office 1 January 2008 – 31 October 2010
- Preceded by: Christoph Blocher
- Succeeded by: Simonetta Sommaruga

Member of the Swiss Federal Council
- In office 1 January 2008 – 31 December 2015
- Preceded by: Christoph Blocher
- Succeeded by: Guy Parmelin

Personal details
- Born: 16 March 1956 (age 70) Felsberg, Switzerland
- Party: Swiss People's Party (before 2008); Conservative Democratic Party (2008–2021); The Centre (2021–present)
- Spouse: Christoph Widmer
- Children: 3
- Education: University of Zürich

Eveline Widmer-Schlumpf (born 16 March 1956) is a Swiss politician and lawyer who served as a Member of the Swiss Federal Council from 2008 to 2015. A member of the Swiss People's Party (SVP/UDC) until 2008, she was then a member of the splinter Conservative Democratic Party (BDP/PBD) until 2021, when that party merged into The Centre. Widmer-Schlumpf was the head of the Federal Department of Justice and Police from 2008 to 2010, when she became head of the Federal Department of Finance. She served as President of the Swiss Confederation in 2012.

== Biography ==
=== Family, education and early career ===
Widmer-Schlumpf is married and has three children. She is the daughter of Federal Councillor Leon Schlumpf. She is the second Federal Councillor whose father had held the same office after Eugène Ruffy, as well as the sixth woman to be elected to the Swiss Federal Council. Eveline Widmer-Schlumpf is also patron of the project SAFFA 2020, alongside the Federal Councillors Doris Leuthard, Simonetta Sommaruga and former Federal Councillor Micheline Calmy-Rey.

Widmer-Schlumpf received her degree in law at the University of Zürich in 1981 and her LLD in 1990. She worked as a lawyer from 1987 to 1998. She was elected to the district court of Trin in 1985, presiding from 1991 to 1997. As a member of the Swiss People's Party, she was elected to the Grand Council of Grisons from 1994 to 1998; that year she was elected to the cantonal government as the first woman, acting as president in 2001 and 2005.

=== Election to the Swiss Federal Council ===
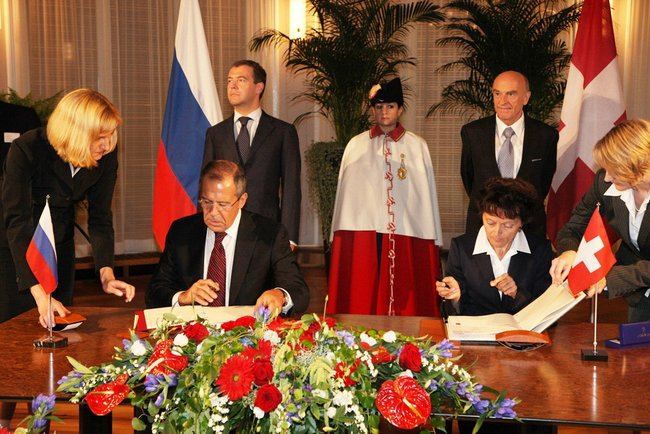
Widmer-Schlumpf alongside Russian Foreign Minister Sergey Lavrov in 2009

Widmer-Schlumpf was named as an alternative candidate to Federal Councillor Christoph Blocher by the Christian Democrat, Social Democrat and Green factions in the 2007 Swiss Federal Council election. In the first round, she received 116 votes, compared to 111 votes for Blocher. In the second round, she was elected to be the 110th Federal Councillor with 125 votes, 115 votes going to Blocher and 6 spurious, empty or invalid. She accepted her election on 13 December 2007. She assumed Blocher's old portfolio as head of the Federal Department of Justice and Police.

=== Foundation of the Conservative Democratic Party ===
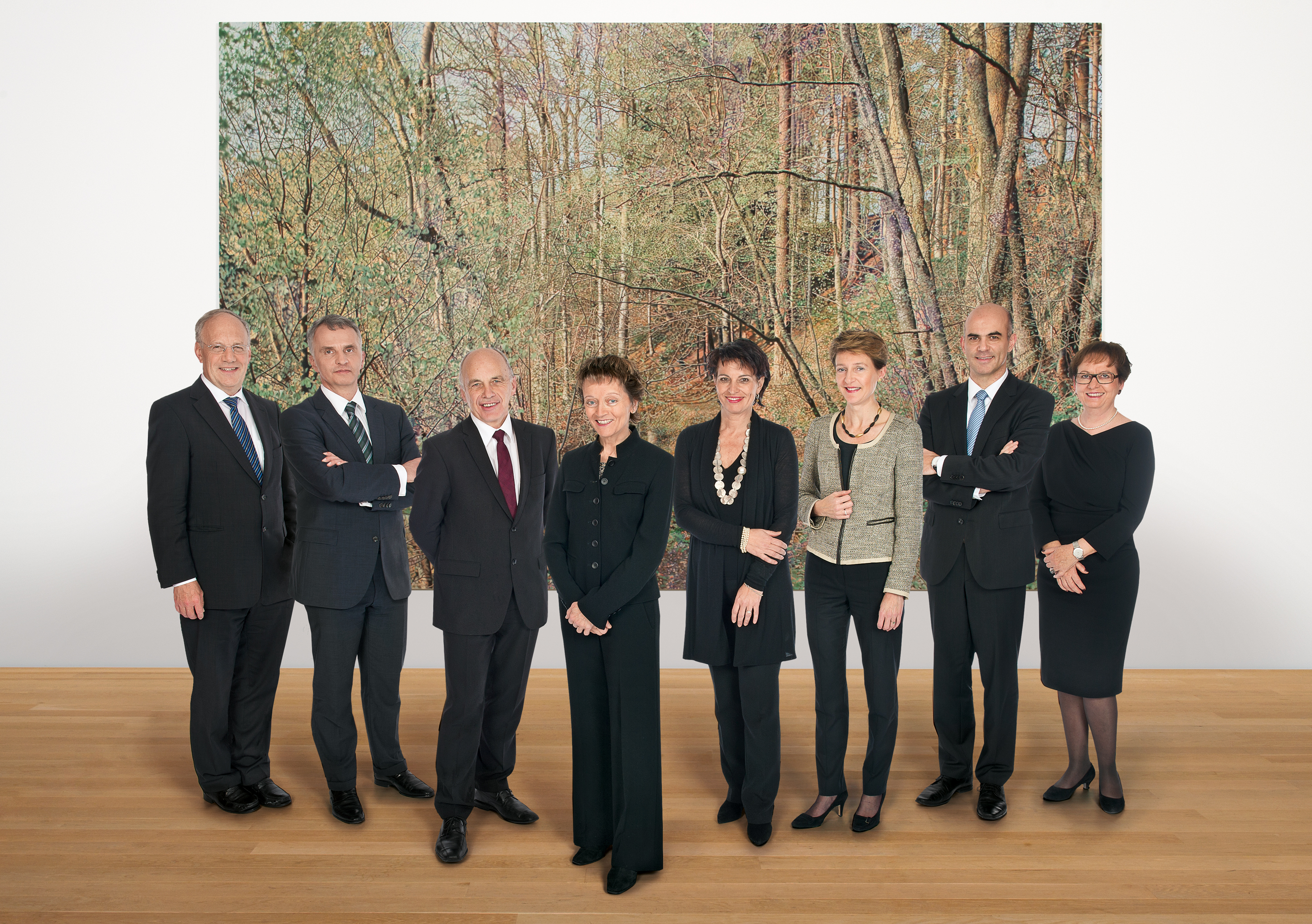
2012 Swiss Federal Council

After her election, Widmer-Schlumpf was intensely opposed by the national leadership of the Swiss People's Party, who denounced her as a traitor to her party for accepting an election that she won without the support of the party. Immediately after her election, she was excluded from the SVP/UDC party group's meetings, as was her colleague Samuel Schmid. In another unprecedented development in Swiss politics, on 2 April 2008 the national party leadership called upon Widmer-Schlumpf to resign from the Federal Council at once and to leave the party. When Widmer-Schlumpf refused to do so, the SVP/UDC demanded that its Grisons section expel her. Since Swiss parties are legally federations of cantonal parties, the SVP/UDC could not directly expel her. The Grisons branch stood by Widmer-Schlumpf, prompting its expulsion from the national party on 1 June. In response, the former SVP Grisons section formed the Conservative Democratic Party of Switzerland. The SVP's Bern section, of which Schmid is a member, also joined the new party.

Following a reshuffle of portfolios after the by-election of two new Federal Councillors in 2010, Widmer-Schlumpf replaced outgoing Hans-Rudolf Merz as the head of the Federal Department of Finance. Widmer-Schlumpf was elected vice president of the Confederation for 2011, alongside President Micheline Calmy-Rey. On 14 December 2011 she was elected President of the Confederation for 2012—the fourth woman to hold the post after Ruth Dreifuss in 1999, Calmy-Rey in 2007 and 2011, and Doris Leuthard in 2010, as well as the third woman in a row. Due to a large amount of turnover on the Federal Council, she was the longest-serving member to have not yet served as its president. After the Swiss People's Party won a record vote of over 29% in the 2015 general election, Widmer-Schlumpf announced she would not run for reelection to the Federal Council on 28 October 2015. She was succeeded by Guy Parmelin.

== Works ==
- Voraussetzungen der Konzession bei Radio und Fernsehen. doctorate thesis. Helbing und Lichtenhahn, Basel 1990, ISBN 3-7190-1157-7.

Political offices
Preceded by Christoph Blocher	Member of the Swiss Federal Council; 2008–2015	Succeeded by Guy Parmelin
Preceded by Christoph Blocher	Head of the Department of Justice and Police; 2008–2010	Succeeded by Simonetta Sommaruga
Preceded by Hans-Rudolf Merz	Head of the Department of Finance; 2010–2015	Succeeded by Ueli Maurer
Preceded by Micheline Calmy-Rey	Vice President of Switzerland; 2011	Succeeded by Ueli Maurer
Preceded by Micheline Calmy-Rey	President of Switzerland; 2012	Succeeded by Ueli Maurer
