= Mercier =

Mercier is French for notions dealer or haberdasher, and may refer to:

== People ==
- Agnès Mercier, French curler and coach
- Annick Mercier (born 1964), French curler
- Amanda H. Mercier (born 1975), American Judge
- Armand Mercier, (1933–2012) former Mayor and City Councilor of Lowell, Massachusetts
- Andrew Mercier, Canadian politician
- Auguste Mercier, French general involved in the Dreyfus Affair
- Claudine Mercier (born 1961), Canadian comedian, singer, actress and impressionist
- Daniel Mercier (1892–1914), French footballer and soldier
- Désiré-Joseph Mercier (1851–1926) Belgian cardinal
- Émile Mercier (archer), French archer and Olympian
- Emile Mercier (cartoonist) (1901–1981), Australian cartoonist
- Estelle Mercier (born 1973), French politician
- François Mercier (1916–1996), French footballer
- Gerry Mercier (born 1941), Canadian politician and judge
- Honoré Mercier (1840–1894), Canadian politician
- Isabelle Mercier (born 1975), Canadian poker player
- Jason Mercier, American poker player
- Juan Ignacio Mercier, Argentinian footballer
- Laura Mercier, French cosmetician and name of cosmetics line
- Lewis Page Mercier, or Louis Mercier, an English translator of Jules Verne's novels
- Lizzy Mercier Descloux (1956–2004), French musician, actress, writer and painter
- Louis-Sébastien Mercier (1740–1814), French writer
- Michel Mercier, contemporary French politician
- Michèle Mercier, French actress
- Pascal Mercier, pseudonym of Swiss writer and philosopher Peter Bieri (born 1944)
- Paul Mercier (actor), an American voice actor and director
- Paul Mercier (Bloc Québécois MP) (1924–2013), Canadian Member of Parliament
- Paul Mercier (Liberal MP) (1888–1943), Canadian Member of Parliament
- Philippe Mercier, French painter
- Pierre Mercier (footballer) (born 1982), Haitian international footballer
- Robert Mercier (1909–1958), French footballer
- Sheila Mercier (1919–2019), English actress
- Thierry Mercier (born 1967), French curler and coach
- Vivian Mercier (1919–1989), Irish critic

== Places ==
=== Canada ===
- Mercier, Quebec, a South Shore suburb of Montreal
- Mercier, Montreal, a former district in Montreal, and former municipality on Montreal Island
- Mercier–Hochelaga-Maisonneuve, a borough of Montreal
- Mercier (federal electoral district), a former federal electoral district, Quebec
- Mercier (provincial electoral district), a Quebec provincial electoral district

=== United States ===
- Mercier, Kansas, an unincorporated community

== Other ==
- Mercier (cycling team), French professional cycling team
- Honoré Mercier Bridge, Quebec, Canada
- Mercier Press, Cork, Ireland
- Champagne Mercier, the French champagne producer
