= Joachim Merz =

German economist

Joachim Merz (born October 26, 1948, in Bad Homburg vor der Höhe) is a German economist. His research involves welfare economics, income and income distribution, wealth, time utilization (time-budgeting research), time and income need, taxes, the job market, consumption and socioeconomics, with emphasis on freelancing, self-employment and salaried employment

== Life ==
Merz studied Business Administration and Business Education at the Goethe University of Frankfurt, where he received his doctorate in 1979. His dissertation topic was "The expenditure of private households - A microeconometric model for the Federal Republic of Germany".

In 1989 he qualified as a professor at the same university in Economics and Econometrics with the topic "Market and non-market activities of private households - Theoretical approach, representative microdata, microeconometric analysis and microsimulation economic- and socio-political provisions for the Federal Republic of Germany".

Since 1991 he serves as the director of the Research Institute on Freelance Professions (FFB) of the Leuphana University Lüneburg. He is the editor of several scientific journals and book series, consultant on scientific boards and referee for many international journals including the ’electronic International Journal of Time Use Research’ (eIJTUR), the CREPS book series ’Center for Research in Entrepreneurship, Professions and Small Business Economics’ (LIT Verlag), the FFB book series ‘Forschungsinstitut Freie Berufe (FFB)’ (Nomos Verlag) and ’The Review of Income and Wealth’. In 1998 he founded the 'Research Network on Time Use' on this website this subject can be researched via a front-end with an information system.

The International Association for Research in Income and Wealth awarded the 2014 Kendrick Prize for the best article published in the Review of Income and Wealth to his article with Tim Rathjen "Time and Income Poverty: An Interdependent Multidimensional Poverty Approach with German Time Use Diary Data".

His current areas of teaching at the Leuphana University Lüneburg are statistics, regression analysis, microeconometrics, panel analysis, policy evaluation, job market, income distribution and empirical economic research.

== Selected publications ==
Journal

- Merz, J. (Hrg.): electronic International Journal of Time Use Research, ISSN 1860-9937.

Books

- Merz, J., (2012): Markt- und nichtmarktmäßige Aktivitäten privater Haushalte, Band 23, 2012, 656 Seiten, Lit Verlag, ISBN 978-3-643-11592-8, Münster
- Merz, J., (und andere) (Hrg.) (2011): Die Dynamik tiefgreifenden Wandels in Gesellschaft, Wirtschaft und Unternehmen, CREPS Band 5, 280 Seiten, Lit Verlag, ISBN 978-3-643-11261-3, Münster
- Merz, J., (Hg.) (2008): Freie Berufe – Einkommen und Steuern (FB€ST) – Beiträge aus Wissenschaft und Praxis, FFB-Schriftenreihe Band 16, Nomos Verlagsgesellschaft, Baden-Baden
- Merz, J., (2002): Freie Berufe im Wandel der Märkte, FFB-Schriften Nr. 13, 168 Seiten, ISBN 3-7890-8107-8, NOMOS Verlagsgesellschaft, Baden-Baden.
- Merz, J., (2001): Existenzgründung 2 – Erfolgsfaktoren und Rahmenbedingungen, FFB-Schriften Nr. 12, 232 Seiten, ISBN 3-7890-7462-4, NOMOS Verlagsgesellschaft, Baden-Baden
- Merz, J., (2001): Existenzgründung 1 – Tips, Training und Erfahrung, FFB-Schriften Nr. 11, 246 Seiten, ISBN 3-7890-7461-6, NOMOS Verlagsgesellschaft, Baden-Baden

Articles

- Merz, J. and T. Rathjen, (2014): Time and Income Poverty: An Interdependent Multidimensional Poverty Approach with German Time Use Diary Data, in: Review of Income and Wealth, 60/3, September, 450-479
- Merz, J. und D. Hirschel, (2011): Income Distribution of Self-Employed as Freelancers and Entrepreneurs in Europe, in: Holzer-Thieser, A. und S. Roth (Hg.), 2011, Versicherungsrecht – Finanzmarkt- und Freiberufsrecht im Wandel wirtschaftsrechtlicher und rechtsökonomischer Analysen, Festschrift für Harald Herrmann, Verlag International Finance, Nürnberg, 179-215
- Merz, J. und T. Rathjen, (2011): Sind Selbstständige zeit- und einkommensarm? Zur Dynamik interdependenter multidimensionaler Armut mit den deutschen Zeitbudgeterhebungen, in: Bekmeier-Feuerhahn, S., Martin, A., Merz, J. und U. Weisenfeld (Hg.), 2011, Die Dynamik tiefgreifenden Wandels in Gesellschaft, Wirtschaft und Unternehmen, Merz, J., Schulte, R. und J. Wagner (Series Eds.), Entrepreneuship, Professions, Small Business Economics, CREPS-Schriftenreihe Vol. 5, Lit Verlag, Münster, 219-244
- Merz, J. (2010): Time Use and Time Budgets, in: RatSWD, German Data Forum - Rat für Sozial- und WirtschaftsDaten (Ed.), Building on Progress - Expanding the Research Infrastructure for the Social, Economic, and Behavioral Sciences, 1, 413-449
- Merz, J., Hanglberger, D. und Rafael Rucha (2010): The Timing of Daily Demand for Goods and Services – Microsimulation Policy Results of an Aging Society, Increasing Labour Market Flexibility, and Extended Public Childcare in Germany, in: Journal of Consumer Policy, Special Issue: Time Allocation, Consumption, and Consumer Policy, 33, 119-141
- Merz, J., Böhm, P. und Derik Burgert (2009): Timing and Fragmentation of Daily Working Hours Arrangements and Income Inequality – An Earnings Treatment Effects Approach with German Time Use Diary Data, in: electronic International Journal of Time Use Research, 6/2, 200-239
