= Robert Cramer (Swiss politician) =

Swiss politician

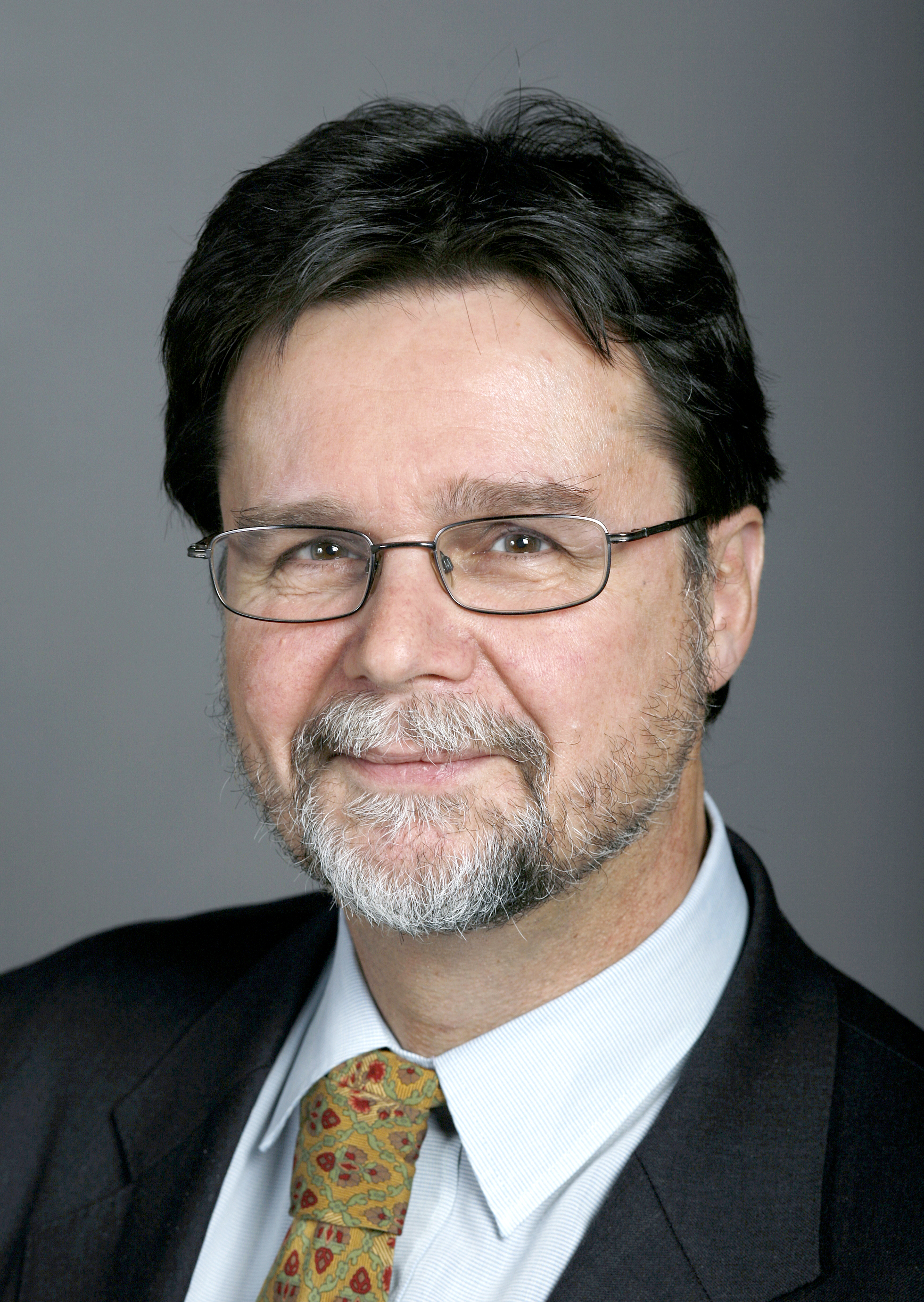
Robert Cramer.

Robert Christian Cramer (born 7 February 1954 in Amsterdam) is a Swiss politician and member of the Green Party of Switzerland. He was educated as a lawyer at the University of Geneva.

From 1988 to 1990, he was head of the cantonal section Green party of Geneva. Cramer was a member of the municipal council of the city of Geneva from 1995 to 1997 and cantonal council of the Canton of Geneva from 1997 to 2005.

Cramer was elected as a representative of the Canton of Geneva in the Swiss Council of States in the 2007 elections.
