= Mertz =

Mertz is a surname. Notable people with the surname include:

- Albert Mertz (1920–1990), Danish painter
- Albrecht Mertz von Quirnheim, (1905–1944), German officer and resistance fighter involved in the 20 July plot against Adolf Hitler
- Barbara Mertz (1927–2013), author of mystery and suspense novels, pseudonyms Elizabeth Peters and Barbara Michaels
- Dolores Mertz (1928–2022), American politician
- Ellen Louise Mertz (1896–1987), Danish geologist
- Elisabeth Drake (née Mertz; 1936–2024), American chemical engineer
- Elizabeth Mertz, American linguistic and legal anthropologist
- Graham Mertz (born 2000), American professional football player
- Harold Mertz, designer of the standard crash test dummy
- Johann Kaspar Mertz (1806–1856), Austrian guitarist and composer
- LuEsther Mertz (1905–1991), founder of Publisher's Clearinghouse
- Robbie Mertz (born 1996), American professional soccer player
- Stephen Mertz (born 1947), American novelist
- Xavier Mertz (1883–1913), Swiss Antarctic explorer

Fictional characters:

- Fred and Ethel Mertz, fictional couple on I Love Lucy

== See also ==
- Mertz Glacier, Antarctica, named after Xavier Mertz
- Merz (surname)
