= Hans-Rudolf Merz =

90th President of the Swiss Confederation

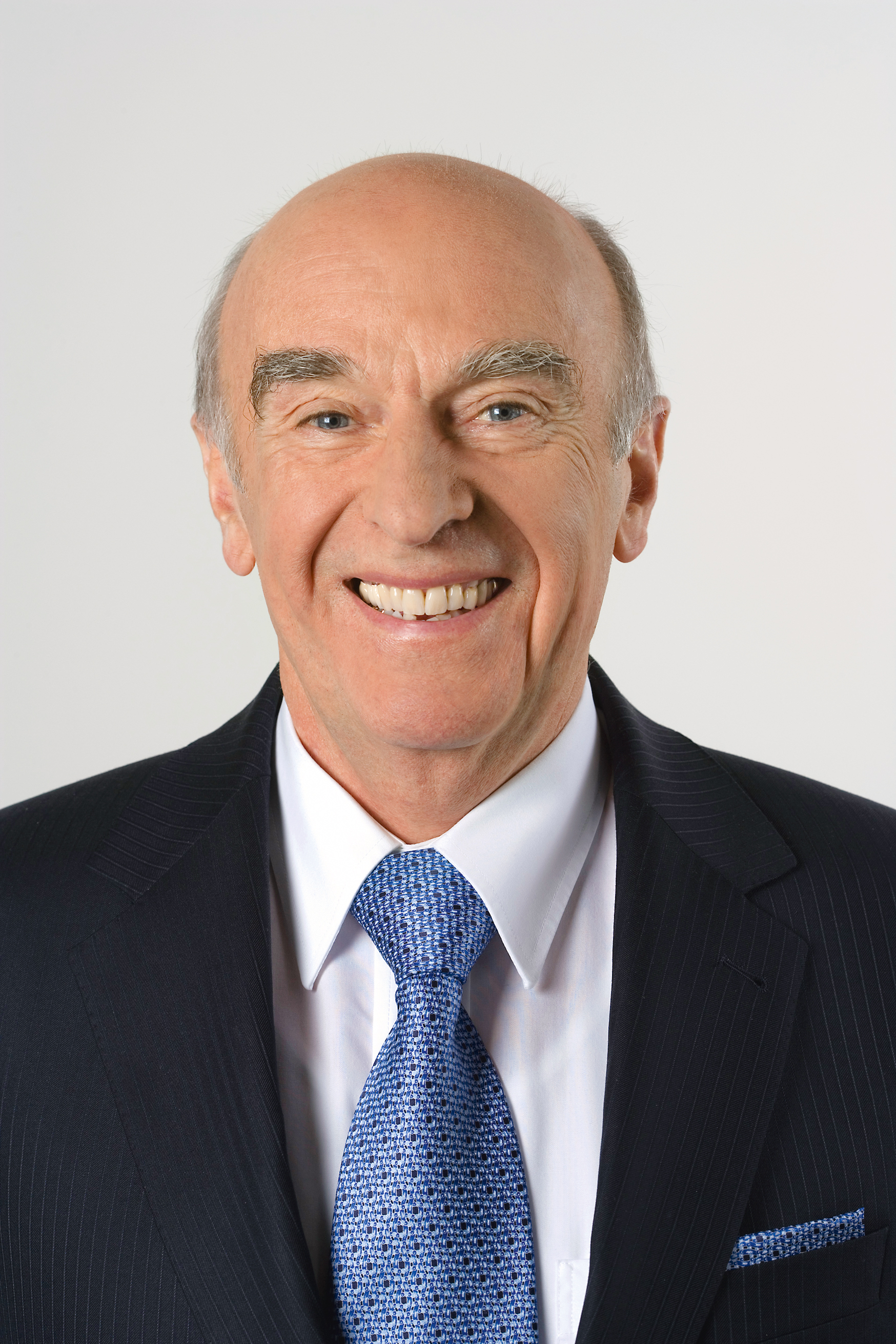
- Official portrait, 2009

President of Switzerland
- In office 1 January 2009 – 31 December 2009
- Vice President: Doris Leuthard
- Preceded by: Pascal Couchepin
- Succeeded by: Doris Leuthard

Vice President of Switzerland
- In office 1 January 2008 – 31 December 2008
- President: Pascal Couchepin
- Preceded by: Pascal Couchepin
- Succeeded by: Doris Leuthard

Head of the Department of Finance
- In office 1 January 2004 – 1 November 2010
- Preceded by: Kaspar Villiger
- Succeeded by: Eveline Widmer-Schlumpf

Member of the Swiss Federal Council
- In office 1 January 2004 – 1 November 2010
- Preceded by: Kaspar Villiger
- Succeeded by: Johann Schneider-Ammann

Personal details
- Born: Hans Rudolf Merz; 10 November 1942 (age 83) Herisau, Switzerland
- Party: Free Democratic Party (before 2009); FDP.The Liberals (2009–present)
- Spouse: Roswitha Katharina Schüller (m. 1968; died 2016)
- Children: 3
- Education: University of St. Gallen
- Profession: Management consultant

Hans-Rudolf Merz (German pronunciation: [ˈhansʁuˌdɔlf mɛrts]; born 10 November 1942) is a Swiss politician who served as President of Switzerland in 2009. He concurrently served as a member of the Federal Council from 2004 to 2010 for the Free Democratic Party (since 2009 The Liberals).

Born in Herisau, Switzerland, into an industrial family, Merz graduated from the University of St. Gallen with a Doctorate in economics in 1971. Upon graduation he worked for various banks as well as consultant in emerging countries before entering politics.

During his tenure in the Swiss government he was mostly associated with the Swiss Banking Secrecy and the tax dispute with the U.S. (UBS affair) as well as the Libya-Switzerland relations, after the crisis stemmed from the arrest of Hannibal Gaddafi, son of Muammar Gaddafi.

== Early life and education ==
Merz was born 10 November 1942 in Herisau, Switzerland, the oldest of three children, to Adolf Merz (1916–1996), a textile manufacturer, and Hedwig Merz (née Brand; 1912–1996). He had two siblings; Adrian Merz (born 1945) and Doris Merz (born 1948).

The Merz family originally hails from Beinwil am See on Lake Hallwil. In 1866, his great-great-grandfather, Heinrich Merz (1831–1872), emigrated to Eastern Switzerland, where the family was active in the textile industry until 1970. During his youth, Merz was a Scout and visited the National Jamboree of Switzerland in July 2008.

After completing his compulsory schooling with the Matura at Kantonsschule Trogen (KST), Merz studied economics at the University of St. Gallen, graduating with a Doctorate.

== Political career ==
From 1969 to 1974, he was party secretary of the Free Democratic Party (FDP/PRD) in St. Gallen. From 1974 to 1977 he worked as vice president for UBS's Wolfsberg formation centre in Ermatingen. Since then he has worked as a management consultant. In 1997 he was elected to the Swiss Council of States for the canton of Appenzell Ausserrhoden. He presided over the finance committee and was a member of the foreign policy committee.

=== Swiss Federal Council ===
Merz was elected to the Swiss Federal Council on 10 December 2003 and took office on 1 January 2004. At the time he was on the board of directors of the Helvetia-Patria insurance company and Anova Holding. He was also a member of the board of trustees of the Max Schmidheiny Foundation.

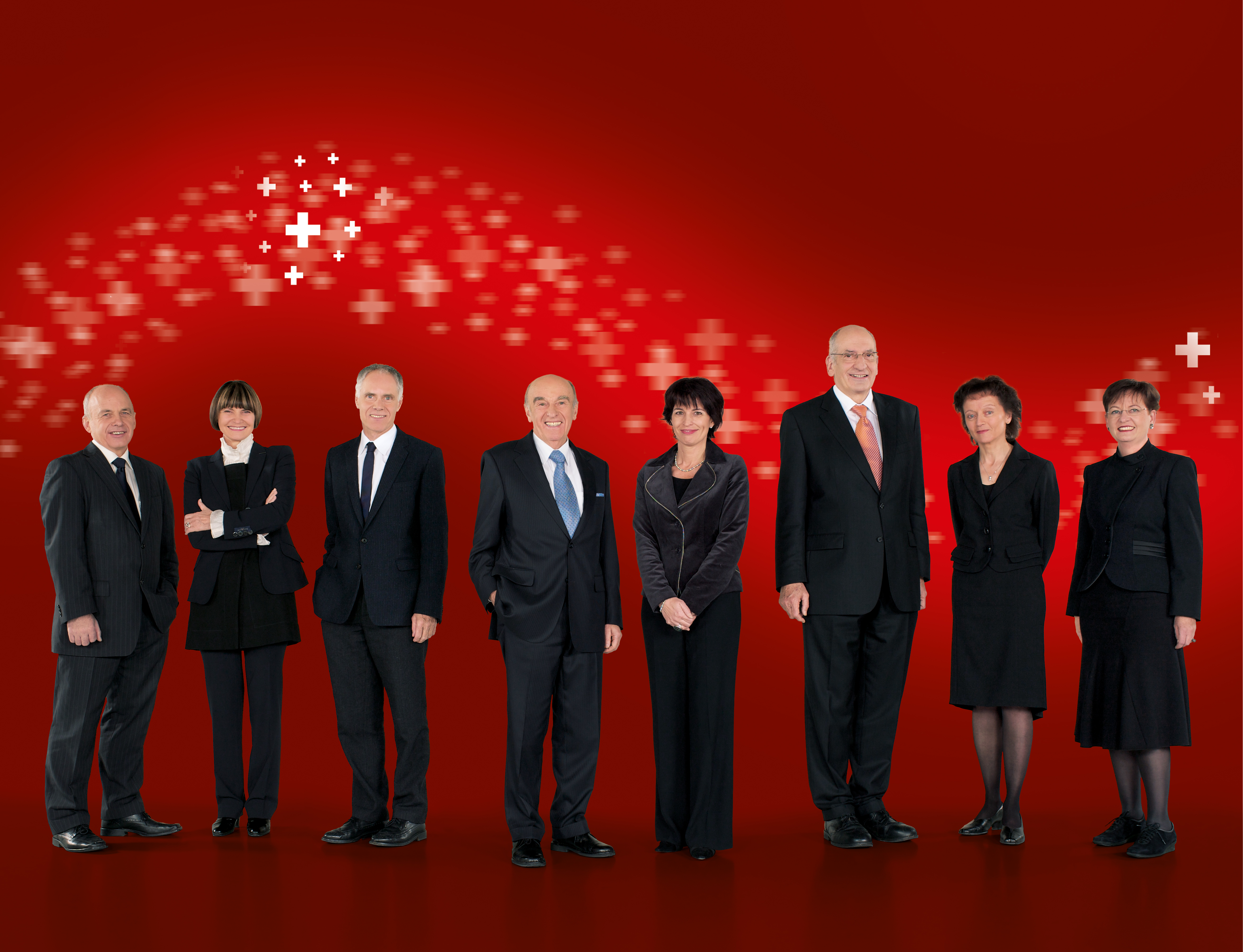
2009 Swiss Federal Council

On 20 September 2008, whilst in Eastern Switzerland, Merz was rushed to hospital, having suffered from a heart attack. He was soon flown to Bern University Hospital, where he had a multiple bypass operation. He was also placed into an artificial coma. This led to a reorganisation of the cabinet and the absence of President Pascal Couchepin from the United Nations General Assembly in New York City. On 10 December 2008, as the Member of the Federal Council that had not been its president for the longest time, Merz was elected President of the Confederation for 2009. In the Federal Assembly, the 66-year-old received 185 out of 209 valid votes. He succeeded Free Democratic Party colleague Pascal Couchepin. Doris Leuthard was elected as Vice President of the Confederation, succeeding Merz.

On 20 September 2010, a recording of Merz replying to a question about meat imports in the Federal Assembly became a viral video, drawing international attention. Merz convulsed with laughter when speaking, later saying that he found the dense bureaucratic language of the reply drafted for him by customs officials amusing. He was attempting to provide information about whether the sales of Bündnerfleisch in Switzerland were endangered by meat imports.

== Personal life ==
In 1968, Merz married Roswitha Katharina Schüller (1941–2016), daughter of Wilhelm Schüller, an artist, and Anna Schüller (née Schüffler). They were introduced since she worked at his parents company in the creative department. His wife suffered from Alzheimer's disease. They had three sons;

- Markus Merz (born 1969), married to Daniela Sturzenegger, no issue.
- Urs Merz (born 1971), married to Zlatica, one son.
- Felix Merz (born 1976), never married and no issue.

Merz resides in Herisau, Switzerland. He is an aficionado for classical music and the opera.

== Works ==
- Merz, Hans-Rudolf: Finanz- und Verwaltungsvermögen in öffentlich-rechtlicher und wirtschaftlicher Betrachtungsweise, unter besonderer Berücksichtigung der Staatsrechnungen der Kantone., St. Gallen 1971
- Merz, Hans-Rudolf: Die aussergewöhnliche Führungspersönlichkeit: Essay über Elativität und elative Persönlichkeit., Grüsch 1987. ISBN 3-7253-0297-9
- Merz, Hans-Rudolf: Der Landammann und weitere Erzählungen aus dem Appenzellerland, Herisau 1992. ISBN 3-85882-072-5

Political offices
Preceded by Kaspar Villiger	Member of the Swiss Federal Council; 2004–2010	Succeeded by Johann Schneider-Ammann
Preceded by Kaspar Villiger	Head of the Department of Finance; 2004–2010	Succeeded by Eveline Widmer-Schlumpf
Preceded by Pascal Couchepin	Vice President of Switzerland; 2008	Succeeded by Doris Leuthard
Preceded by Pascal Couchepin	President of Switzerland; 2009	Succeeded by Doris Leuthard
