= Samuel Schmid =

88th President of the Swiss Confederation

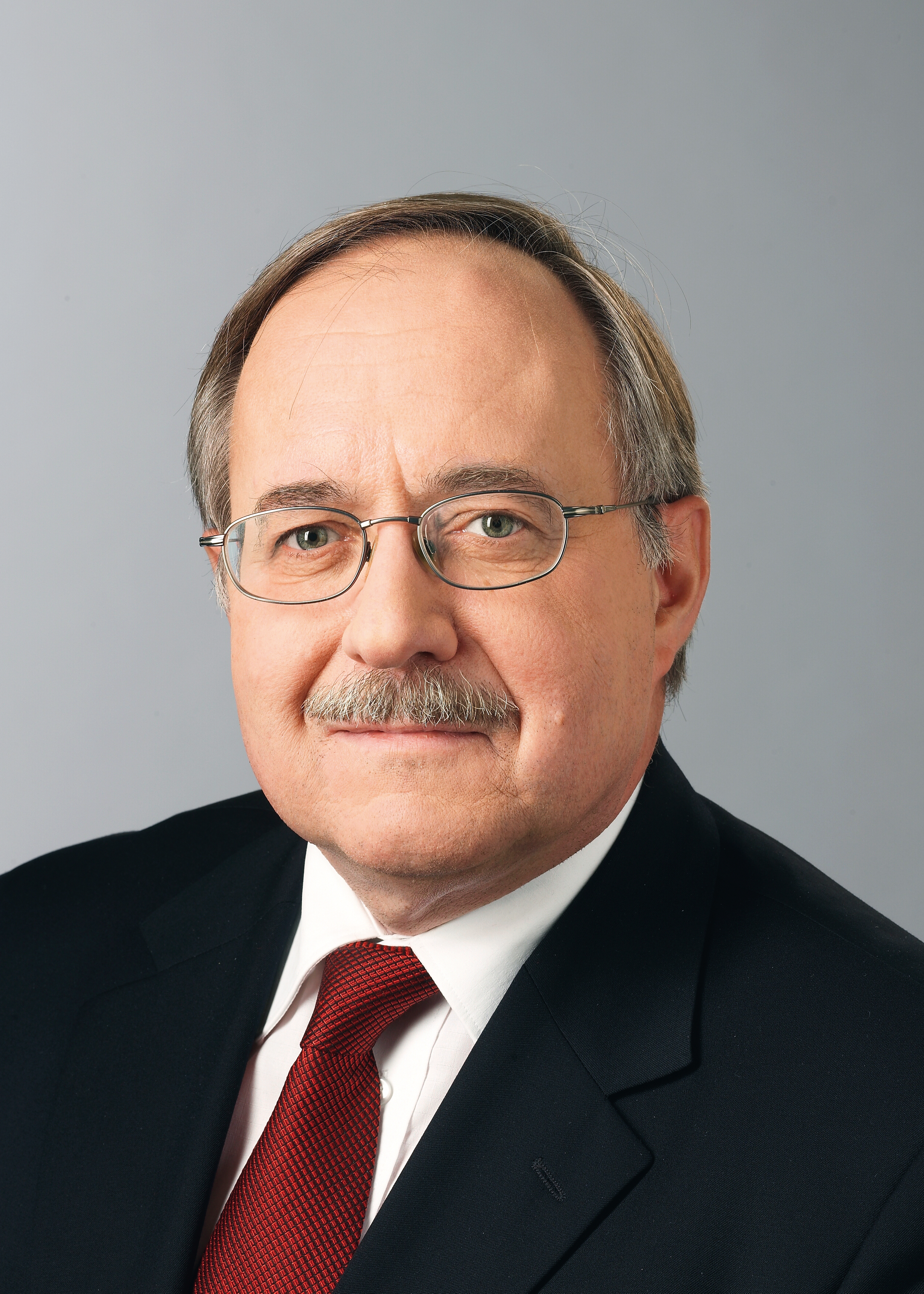

Member of the Swiss Federal Council
- In office 1 January 2001 – 31 December 2008
- Preceded by: Adolf Ogi
- Succeeded by: Ueli Maurer

President of Switzerland
- In office 1 January 2005 – 31 December 2005
- Vice President: Moritz Leuenberger
- Preceded by: Joseph Deiss
- Succeeded by: Moritz Leuenberger

Minister of Defence, Civil Protection and Sports of Switzerland
- In office 1 January 2001 – 31 December 2008
- Preceded by: Adolf Ogi
- Succeeded by: Ueli Maurer

Vice President of Switzerland
- In office 1 January 2004 – 31 December 2004
- President: Joseph Deiss
- Preceded by: Ruth Metzler
- Succeeded by: Moritz Leuenberger

Personal details
- Born: 8 January 1947 (age 79) Rüti bei Büren, Switzerland
- Party: Swiss People's Party (before 2008); Conservative Democratic Party (2008–2020); The Centre (2021–present)
- Children: 3

Samuel Schmid (born 8 January 1947) is a Swiss politician who served as a Member of the Swiss Federal Council from 2000 to 2008. He was the head of the Federal Department of Defence, Civil Protection and Sports (notably acting as a defense minister for Switzerland).

Schmid was born in Rüti bei Büren, Canton of Bern. He was elected to the Federal Council on 6 December 2000. He was a member of the Swiss People's Party (SVP/UDC), and is now a member of The Centre. During his time in office he has held the Federal Department of Defence, Civil Protection and Sports. In 2004, he was the vice-President of the Confederation and President in 2005.

Schmid was a member of the SVP's centrist/agrarian wing. He was put under pressure by the party's nationalist wing, led by National Councillor Christoph Blocher, for taking a moderate stance on certain issues. After the SVP became the largest party in the Federal Assembly in the 2003 federal elections, the SVP threatened to remove Schmid from the Council if it didn't get an additional seat (which eventually went to Blocher in that year).

After Blocher was defeated for reelection to the Federal Council in favour of another SVP moderate, Eveline Widmer-Schlumpf, the SVP caucus voted to exclude Schmid and Widmer-Schlumpf from the party group. Some called for them to be thrown out of the party altogether. However, Swiss parties are legally federations of cantonal parties. For Schmid to have been expelled, the SVP's Bern section would have had to terminate his membership, and it refused to do so. In 2008, Schmid joined the newly formed Conservative Democratic Party, along with almost all of the SVP's Bern section.

On 12 November 2008, Schmid resigned from the Federal Council effective 1 January 2009. The resignation followed a months-long period of intense political pressure by the Swiss People's Party owing to scandals and accidents in the Swiss military, as well as bouts of ill health. Samuel Schmid was succeeded by Ueli Maurer of the Swiss People's Party.

== Footnotes ==
Political offices
Preceded by Adolf Ogi	Member of the Swiss Federal Council; 2001–2008	Succeeded by Ueli Maurer
Preceded by Joseph Deiss	President of Switzerland; 2005	Succeeded by Moritz Leuenberger
