= List of members of the National Council of Switzerland, 2011–2015 =

This is a list of members of the Swiss National Council for the 2011–2015 term. The National Council has 200 members, each elected to represent one of twenty-six cantons. Elections were held on 23 October 2011, along with elections to the Council of States. Eleven parties are represented in the National Council: the one fewer than in the previous National Council.

Name	Party	Canton	Notes
Christoph Blocher	Swiss People's Party	Zurich	
Christoph Mörgeli	Swiss People's Party	Zurich	
Toni Bortoluzzi	Swiss People's Party	Zurich	
Max Binder	Swiss People's Party	Zurich	
Hans Fehr	Swiss People's Party	Zurich	Retired effective 8 September 2013. Succeeded by Martina Munz.
Natalie Rickli	Swiss People's Party	Zurich	
Bruno Zuppiger	Swiss People's Party	Zurich	Resigned 10 September 2012. Succeeded by Gregor Rutz.
Alfred Heer	Swiss People's Party	Zurich	
Jürg Stahl	Swiss People's Party	Zurich	
Hans Kaufmann	Swiss People's Party	Zurich	
Hans Egloff	Swiss People's Party	Zurich	
Thomas Hardegger	Social Democratic Party	Zurich	
Jacqueline Fehr	Social Democratic Party	Zurich	
Daniel Jositsch	Social Democratic Party	Zurich	
Andreas Gross	Social Democratic Party	Zurich	
Jacqueline Badran	Social Democratic Party	Zurich	
Chantal Galladé	Social Democratic Party	Zurich	
Martin Naef	Social Democratic Party	Zurich	
Ruedi Noser	FDP.The Liberals	Zurich	
Doris Fiala	FDP.The Liberals	Zurich	
Filippo Leutenegger	FDP.The Liberals	Zurich	
Markus Hutter	FDP.The Liberals	Zurich	
Daniel Vischer	Green Party	Zurich	
Bastien Girod	Green Party	Zurich	
Balthasar Glättli	Green Party	Zurich	
Kathy Riklin	Christian Democratic People's Party	Zurich	
Barbara Schmid-Federer	Christian Democratic People's Party	Zurich	
Martin Bäumle	Green Liberal Party	Zurich	GLP party president
Tiana Angelina Moser	Green Liberal Party	Zurich	
Thomas Weibel	Green Liberal Party	Zurich	
Thomas Maier	Green Liberal Party	Zurich	
Maja Ingold	Evangelical People's Party	Zurich	
Lothar Ziörjen	Conservative Democratic Party	Zurich	
Rosmarie Quadranti-Stahel	Conservative Democratic Party	Zurich	
Andreas Aebi	Swiss People's Party	Bern	
Andrea Geissbühler	Swiss People's Party	Bern	
Rudolf Joder	Swiss People's Party	Bern	
Erich von Siebenthal	Swiss People's Party	Bern	
Hansruedi Wandfluh	Swiss People's Party	Bern	
Adrian Amstutz	Swiss People's Party	Bern	
Nadja Pieren	Swiss People's Party	Bern	
Albert Rösti	Swiss People's Party	Bern	
Evi Allemann	Social Democratic Party	Bern	
Margret Kiener Nellen	Social Democratic Party	Bern	
Ursula Wyss	Social Democratic Party	Bern	Ursula Wyss resigned 3 March 2013. Succeeded by Nadine Masshardt.
Corrado Pardini	Social Democratic Party	Bern	
Hans Stöckli	Social Democratic Party	Bern	
Matthias Aebischer	Social Democratic Party	Bern	
Christa Markwalder	FDP.The Liberals	Bern	
Christian Wasserfallen	FDP.The Liberals	Bern	
Franziska Teuscher	Green Party	Bern	Resigned to take a seat in the Bern government. Succeeded by Aline Trede
Alec von Graffenried	Green Party	Bern	Retired 5 June 2015. Succeeded by Christine Häsler.
Regula Rytz	Green Party	Bern	
Marianne Streiff-Feller	Evangelical People's Party	Bern	
Ursula Haller Vannini	Conservative Democratic Party	Bern	
Hans Grunder	Conservative Democratic Party	Bern	BDP party president
Urs Gasche	Conservative Democratic Party	Bern	
Lorenz Hess	Conservative Democratic Party	Bern	
Jürg Grossen	Green Liberal Party	Bern	
Kathrin Bertschy	Green Liberal Party	Bern	
Ida Glanzmann-Hunkeler	Christian Democratic People's Party	Lucerne	
Ruedi Lustenberger	Christian Democratic People's Party	Lucerne	
Leo Müller	Christian Democratic People's Party	Lucerne	
Otto Ineichen	FDP.The Liberals	Lucerne	Died 6 June 2012. Succeeded by Peter Schilliger.
Albert Vitali	FDP.The Liberals	Lucerne	
Yvette Estermann	Swiss People's Party	Lucerne	
Felix Müri	Swiss People's Party	Lucerne	
Prisca Birrer-Heimo	Social Democratic Party	Lucerne	
Louis Schelbert	Green Party	Lucerne	
Roland Fischer	Green Liberal Party	Lucerne	
Gabi Huber	FDP.The Liberals	Uri	
Andy Tschümperlin	Social Democratic Party	Schwyz	
Alois Gmür	Christian Democratic People's Party	Schwyz	
Pirmin Schwander	Swiss People's Party	Schwyz	
Petra Gössi	FDP.The Liberals	Schwyz	
Karl Vogler	Christian Social Party	Obwalden	
Peter Keller	Swiss People's Party	Nidwalden	
Martin Landolt	Conservative Democratic Party	Glarus	
Gerhard Pfister	Christian Democratic People's Party	Zug	
Bruno Pezzatti	FDP.The Liberals	Zug	
Thomas Aeschi	Swiss People's Party	Zug	
Dominique de Buman	Christian Democratic People's Party	Fribourg	
Christine Bulliard-Marbach	Christian Democratic People's Party	Fribourg	
Christian Levrat	Social Democratic Party	Fribourg	SPS party president. Resigned 28 May 2012 to join the Council of States. Succeeded by Ursula Schneider Schüttel.
Jean-François Steiert	Social Democratic Party	Fribourg	
Valérie Piller Carrard	Social Democratic Party	Fribourg	
Jacques Bourgeois	FDP.The Liberals	Fribourg	
Jean-François Rime	Swiss People's Party	Fribourg	
Roland Borer	Swiss People's Party	Solothurn	
Walter Wobmann	Swiss People's Party	Solothurn	
Kurt Fluri	FDP.The Liberals	Solothurn	
Bea Heim	Social Democratic Party	Solothurn	
Philipp Hadorn	Social Democratic Party	Solothurn	
Pirmin Bischof	Christian Democratic People's Party	Solothurn	
Stefan Müller-Altermatt	Christian Democratic People's Party	Solothurn	
Peter Malama	FDP.The Liberals	Basel-Stadt	Died 22 September 2012. Succeeded by Daniel Stolz.
Silvia Schenker	Social Democratic Party	Basel-Stadt	
Beat Jans	Social Democratic Party	Basel-Stadt	
Markus Lehmann	Christian Democratic People's Party	Basel-Stadt	
Sebastian Frehner	Swiss People's Party	Basel-Stadt	
Daniela Schneeberger	FDP.The Liberals	Basel-Landschaft	
Susanne Leutenegger Oberholzer	Social Democratic Party	Basel-Landschaft	
Eric Nussbaumer	Social Democratic Party	Basel-Landschaft	
Caspar Baader	Swiss People's Party	Basel-Landschaft	
Thomas de Courten	Swiss People's Party	Basel-Landschaft	
Elisabeth Schneider-Schneiter	Christian Democratic People's Party	Basel-Landschaft	
Maya Graf	Green Party	Basel-Landschaft	
Hans-Jürg Fehr	Social Democratic Party	Schaffhausen	
Thomas Hurter	Swiss People's Party	Schaffhausen	
Andrea Claudio Caroni	FDP.The Liberals	Appenzell Ausserrhoden	
Daniel Fässler	Christian Democratic People's Party	Appenzell Innerrhoden	
Toni Brunner	Swiss People's Party	St. Gallen	SVP party president
Lukas Reimann	Swiss People's Party	St. Gallen	
Roland Rino Büchel	Swiss People's Party	St. Gallen	
Thomas Müller	Swiss People's Party	St. Gallen	
Paul Rechsteiner	Social Democratic Party	St. Gallen	
Hildegard Fässler	Social Democratic Party	St. Gallen	Resigned 3 March 2013. Succeeded by Claudia Friedl.
Lucrezia Meier-Schatz	Christian Democratic People's Party	St. Gallen	
Jakob Büchler	Christian Democratic People's Party	St. Gallen	
Markus Ritter	Christian Democratic People's Party	St. Gallen	
Yvonne Gilli	Green Party	St. Gallen	
Walter Müller	FDP.The Liberals	St. Gallen	
Margrit Kessler	Green Liberal Party	St. Gallen	
Heinz Brand	Swiss People's Party	Graubünden	
Silva Semadeni Bruderer	Social Democratic Party	Graubünden	
Hansjörg Hassler	Conservative Democratic Party	Graubünden	
Martin Candinas	Christian Democratic People's Party	Graubünden	
Josias Gasser	Green Liberal Party	Graubünden	
Ulrich Giezendanner	Swiss People's Party	Aargau	
Luzi Stamm	Swiss People's Party	Aargau	
Sylvia Flückiger-Bäni	Swiss People's Party	Aargau	
Hans Killer	Swiss People's Party	Aargau	
Maximilian Reimann	Swiss People's Party	Aargau	
Hansjörg Knecht	Swiss People's Party	Aargau	
Max Chopard-Acklin	Social Democratic Party	Aargau	
Cédric Wermuth	Social Democratic Party	Aargau	
Yvonne Feri	Social Democratic Party	Aargau	
Philipp Müller	FDP.The Liberals	Aargau	
Corina Eichenberger-Walther	FDP.The Liberals	Aargau	
Ruth Humbel Näf	Christian Democratic People's Party	Aargau	
Geri Müller	Green Party	Aargau	
Bernhard Guhl	Conservative Democratic Party	Aargau	
Beat Flach	Green Liberal Party	Aargau	
Edith Graf-Litscher	Social Democratic Party	Thurgau	
Brigitte Häberli-Koller	Christian Democratic People's Party	Thurgau	
Peter Spuhler	Swiss People's Party	Thurgau	Resigned 31 December 2012. Succeeded by Verena Herzog.
Hansjörg Walter	Swiss People's Party	Thurgau	
Markus Hausammann	Swiss People's Party	Thurgau	
Thomas Böhni	Green Liberal Party	Thurgau	
Pierre Rusconi	Swiss People's Party	Ticino	
Ignazio Cassis	FDP.The Liberals	Ticino	
Fulvio Pelli	FDP.The Liberals	Ticino	FDP party president. Pelli resigned effective 4 March 2014. Succeeded by Giovanni Merlini.
Fabio Regazzi	Christian Democratic People's Party	Ticino	
Roberta Pantani	Ticino League	Ticino	
Lorenzo Quadri	Ticino League	Ticino	
Marina Carobbio Guscetti	Social Democratic Party	Ticino	
Géraldine Savary	Social Democratic Party	Vaud	
Roger Nordmann	Social Democratic Party	Vaud	
Ada Marra	Social Democratic Party	Vaud	
Eric Voruz	Social Democratic Party	Vaud	
Josiane Aubert	Social Democratic Party	Vaud	Resigned 1 June 2014. Succeeded by Rebecca Ruiz.
Cesla Amarelle	Social Democratic Party	Vaud	
Isabelle Moret	FDP.The Liberals	Vaud	
Olivier Français	FDP.The Liberals	Vaud	
Olivier Feller	FDP.The Liberals	Vaud	
Isabelle Chevalley	Green Liberal Party	Vaud	
Guy Parmelin	Swiss People's Party	Vaud	
André Bugnon	Swiss People's Party	Vaud	
Jean-Pierre Grin	Swiss People's Party	Vaud	
Pierre-François Veillon	Swiss People's Party	Vaud	
Fathi Derder	FDP.The Liberals	Vaud	
Luc Recordon	Green Party	Vaud	
Adèle Thorens	Green Party	Vaud	
Jacques Neirynck	Christian Democratic People's Party	Vaud	
Viola Amherd	Christian Democratic People's Party	Valais	
Stéphane Rossini	Social Democratic Party	Valais	
Mathias Reynard	Social Democratic Party	Valais	
Jean-René Germanier	FDP.The Liberals	Valais	
Christophe Darbellay	Christian Democratic People's Party	Valais	CVP party president
Yannick Buttet	Christian Democratic People's Party	Valais	
Oskar Freysinger	Swiss People's Party	Valais	
Laurent Favre	FDP.The Liberals	Neuchâtel	
Alain Ribaux	FDP.The Liberals	Neuchâtel	Resigned 31 August 2013 to take a seat on the Grand Council of Neuchâtel. Succeeded by Sylvie Perrinjaquet.
Jacques-André Maire	Social Democratic Party	Neuchâtel	
Francine John-Calame	Green Party	Neuchâtel	
Yvan Perrin	Swiss People's Party	Neuchâtel	Resigned to take a seat on the Grand Council of Neuchâtel, succeeded by Raymond Clottu on 9 September 2013.
Ueli Leuenberger	Green Party	Geneva	Green Party president
Antonio Hodgers	Green Party	Geneva	Resigned on 26 November 2013. Succeeded by Anne Mahrer.
Carlo Sommaruga	Social Democratic Party	Geneva	
Maria Roth-Bernasconi	Social Democratic Party	Geneva	
Manuel Tornare	Social Democratic Party	Geneva	
Luc Barthassat	Christian Democratic People's Party	Geneva	Barthassat resigned to take a seat on the Council of State of Geneva on 5 December 2013 and was succeeded by Guillaume Barazzone.
Yves Nidegger	Swiss People's Party	Geneva	
Céline Amaudruz	Swiss People's Party	Geneva	
Mauro Poggia	Geneva Citizens' Movement	Geneva	Resigned 29 November 2013 to take a seat on the Council of State of Geneva. Succeeded by Roger Golay.
Hugues Hiltpold	FDP.The Liberals	Geneva	
Christian Lüscher	FDP.The Liberals	Geneva	
Jean-Paul Gschwind	Christian Democratic People's Party	Jura	
Pierre-Alain Fridez	Social Democratic Party	Jura	

== See also ==
- List of members of the Swiss Council of States
