= 2010 Swiss Federal Council election =

- 22 September 2010
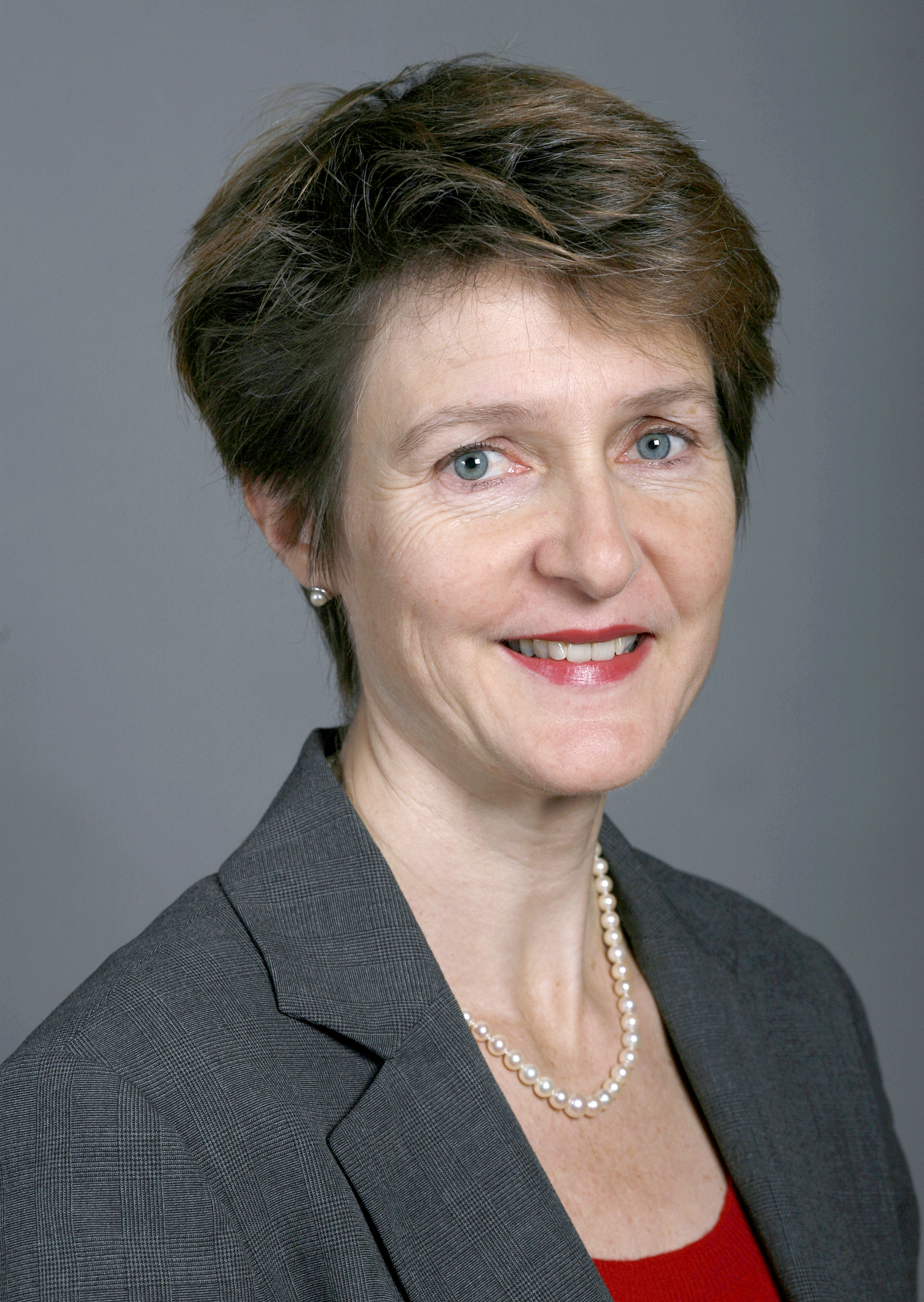

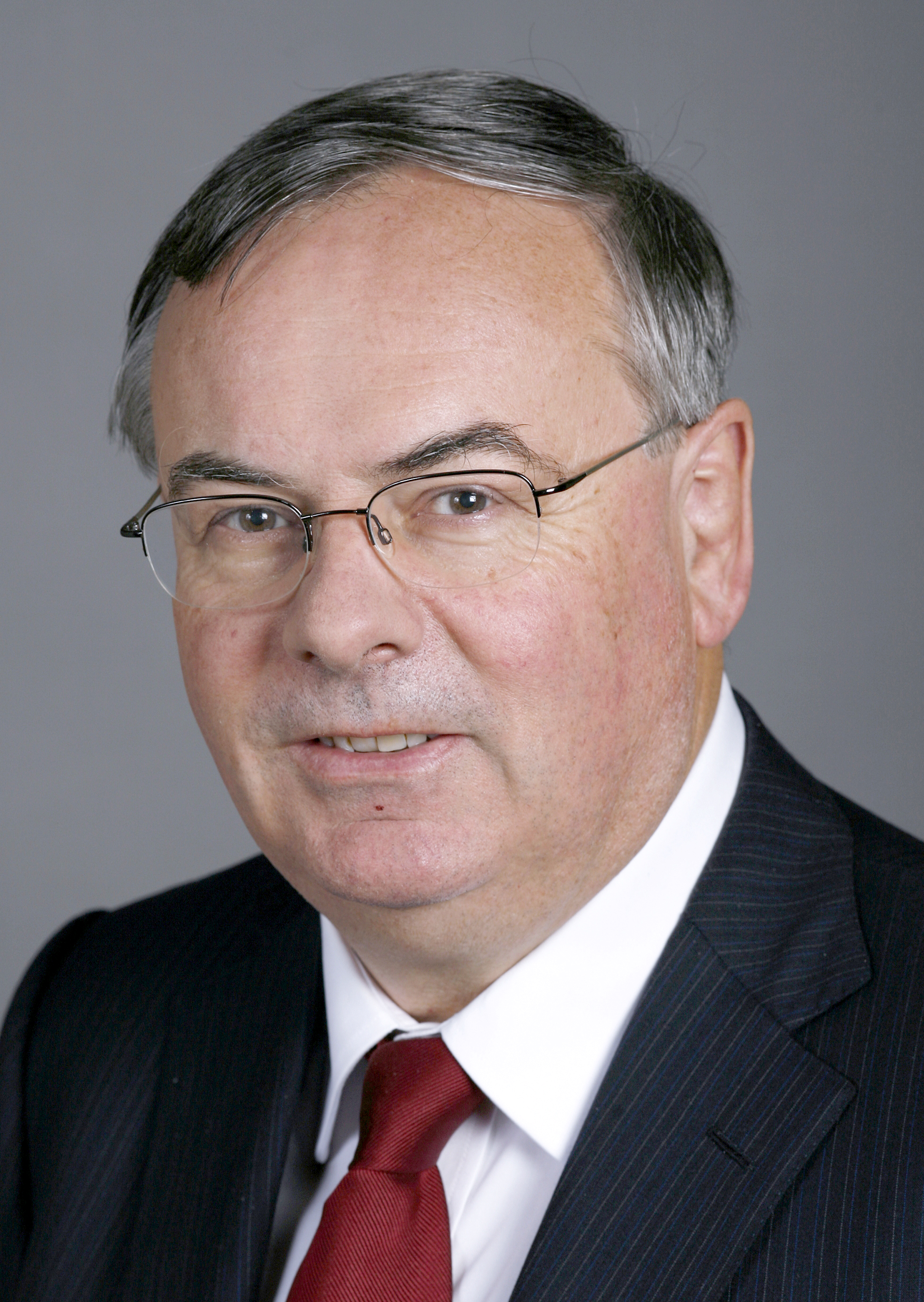
Nominee	Simonetta Sommaruga	Jean-François Rime
Party	Social Democrats	Swiss People's
Electoral vote	159	81
Federal Councillor before election
Moritz Leuenberger
Social Democrats
Elected Federal Councillor
Simonetta Sommaruga
Social Democrats

2010 Swiss Federal Council election
- 22 September 2010
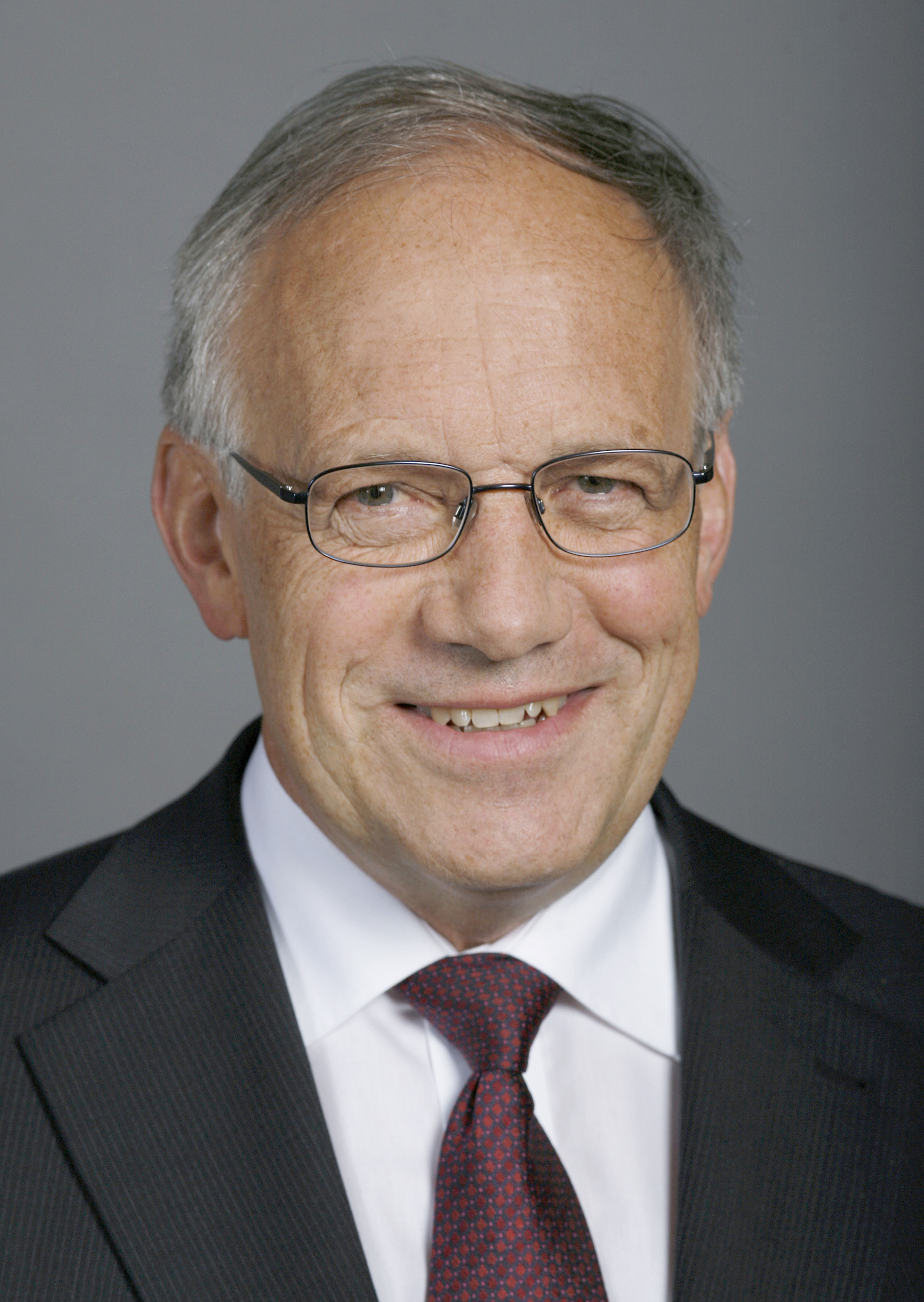

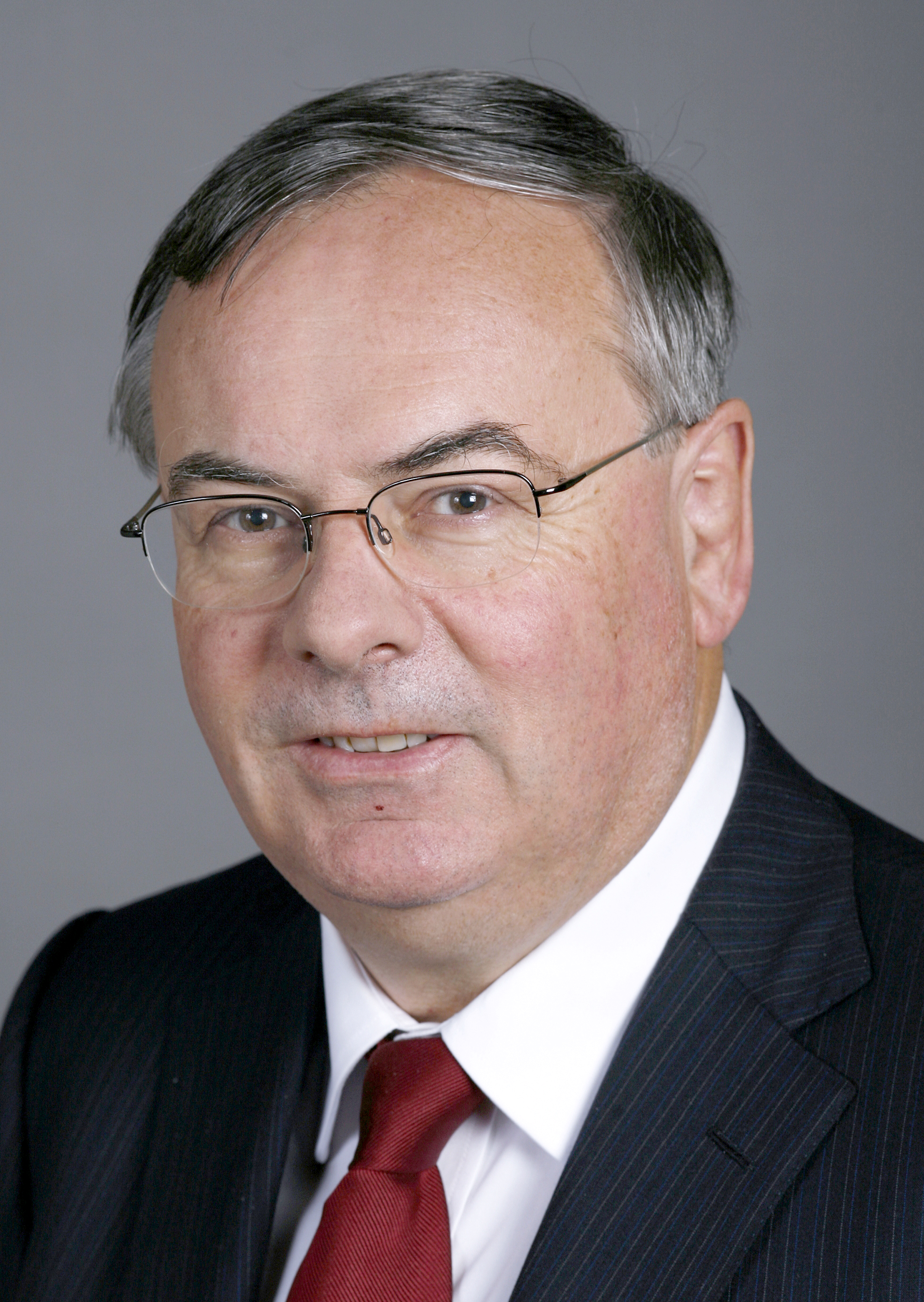
Nominee	Johann Schneider-Ammann	Jean-François Rime
Party	FDP.The Liberals	Swiss People's
Electoral vote	144	93
Federal Councillor before election
Hans-Rudolf Merz
FDP.The Liberals
Elected Federal Councillor
Johann Schneider-Ammann
FDP.The Liberals

Two by-elections to the Swiss Federal Council were held in Switzerland on 22 September 2010, after federal councillors Moritz Leuenberger (SP) and Hans-Rudolf Merz (FDP.The Liberals) announced they would step down from the Federal Council towards the end of the year. The by-elections resulted in the elections of Simonetta Sommaruga from the SP and Johann Schneider-Ammann from the FDP, resulting in no change in the partisan composition of the council. It also resulted in the first (and, to date, most recent) majority of women on the Federal Council in its history, with Sommaruga joining Micheline Calmy-Rey, Doris Leuthard and Eveline Widmer-Schlumpf.

== Background ==
In Switzerland, the 7-seat executive Federal Council is traditionally apportioned between the parties following the unwritten agreement known as the Magic formula (since 2003: SVP 2 seats, SP 2 seats, FDP 2 seats, and CVP 1 seat. The formula was followed from 1959 until 2008 when both SVP councillors were expelled and formed the BDP; the SVP regained one seat in 2009 with Ueli Maurer's election but continued seeking ways to regain its claimed second seat. The Greens also now claimed one seat to the council due to their gains in the 2007 federal election.

Federal councillors are traditionally re-elected until they step down, only four ever lost re-election. Councillors more often stand down during their term as it allows their party to get more visibility at a moment other than shortly after a general election.

Federal Councillor Moritz Leuenberger (SP) announced in July 2010 he would leave the Federal Council effective 31 December 2010, later followed by Federal Councillor Hans-Rudolf Merz (FDP.The Liberals) who on 6 August 2010 announced his intention to retire effective late October 2010. Leuenberger advanced the date of his effective resignation to coincide in a single voting session.

=== Electoral system ===
The seat is elected using an absolute majority with an exhaustive ballot, each seat being filled independently. In the first two rounds members of the Federal Assembly can vote for anyone eligible, but only those receiving at least ten votes are announced in the results; from the third round onwards only candidates who received at least ten votes in one of the first two rounds are eligible, the last-placed candidate is eliminated until someone reaches an overall majority.

== Candidates ==
=== Merz's seat ===
Both the Green Party and the Swiss People's Party laid claim to the FDP's seat. The election was complicated by the fact that Federal Councillor Moritz Leuenberger (Social Democratic Party, SP/PS), having previously announced his intention to retire from the council effective late December 2010, predated his resignation so that only one electoral session would have to be held (the election to his seat was initially to be held on 8 December 2010).

Possible candidates by the FDP for Merz's seat included Karin Keller-Sutter, Gabi Huber, Johann Schneider-Ammann, Philipp Müller, Felix Gutzwiller, Ruedi Noser, Christa Markwalder, Fulvio Pelli, Laura Sadis, Ignazio Cassis and Peter Malama. Malama officially announced his candidacy on 20 August 2010, and Schneider-Ammann was nominated on 2 September 2010. Noser, Keller-Sutter and Cassis were also nominated.

The following were nominated as official candidates for Merz's seat:

- Karin Keller-Sutter (FDP-SG), member of the Government of St. Gallen (2000–2012)
- Johann Schneider-Ammann (FDP-BE), National Councillor for Bern (1999–)
- Jean-François Rime (SVP-FR), National Councillor for Fribourg (2003–)
- Brigit Wyss (GPS-SO), National Councillor for Solothurn (2007–)
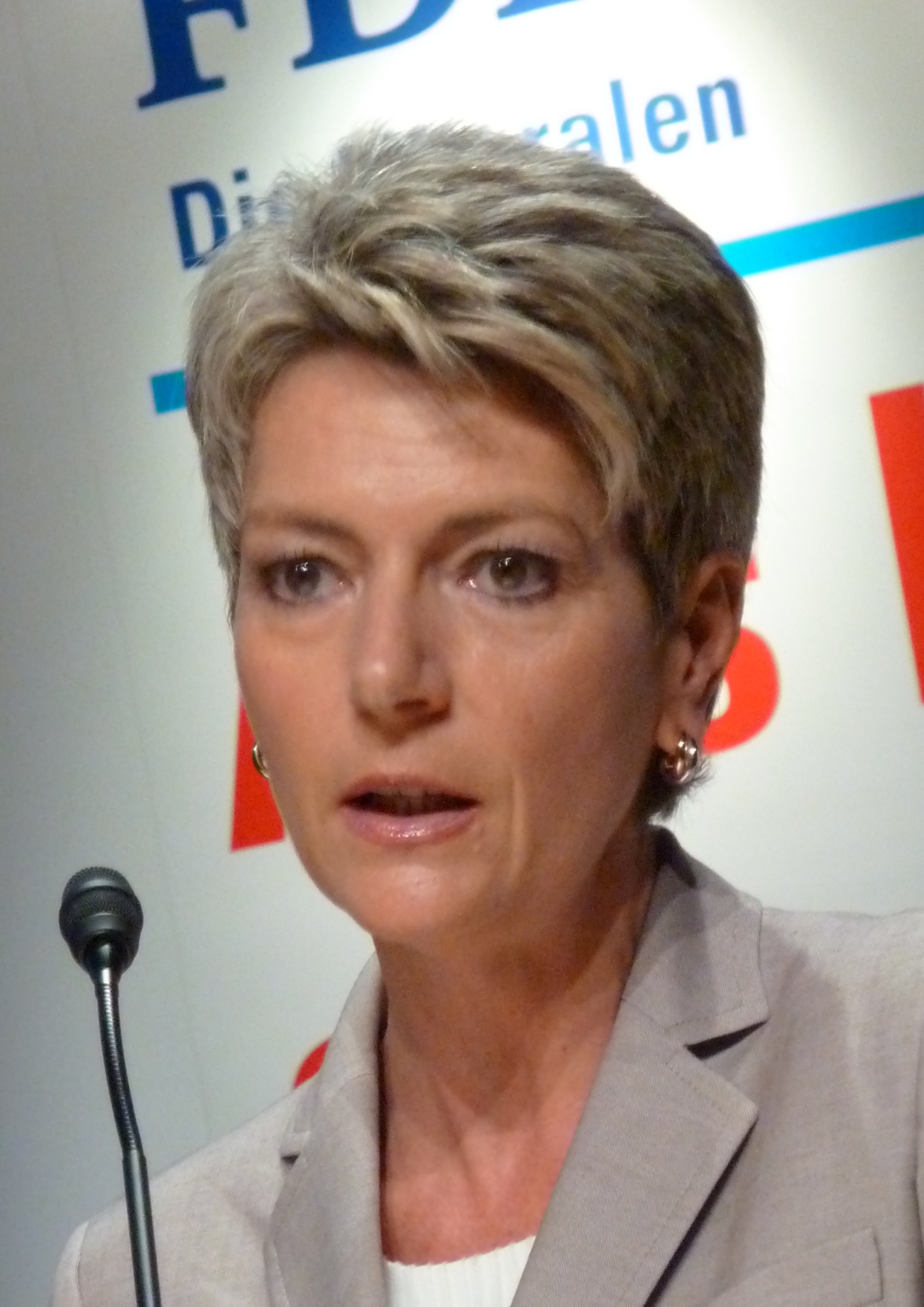
Government Minister
Karin Keller-Sutter
of St. Gallen

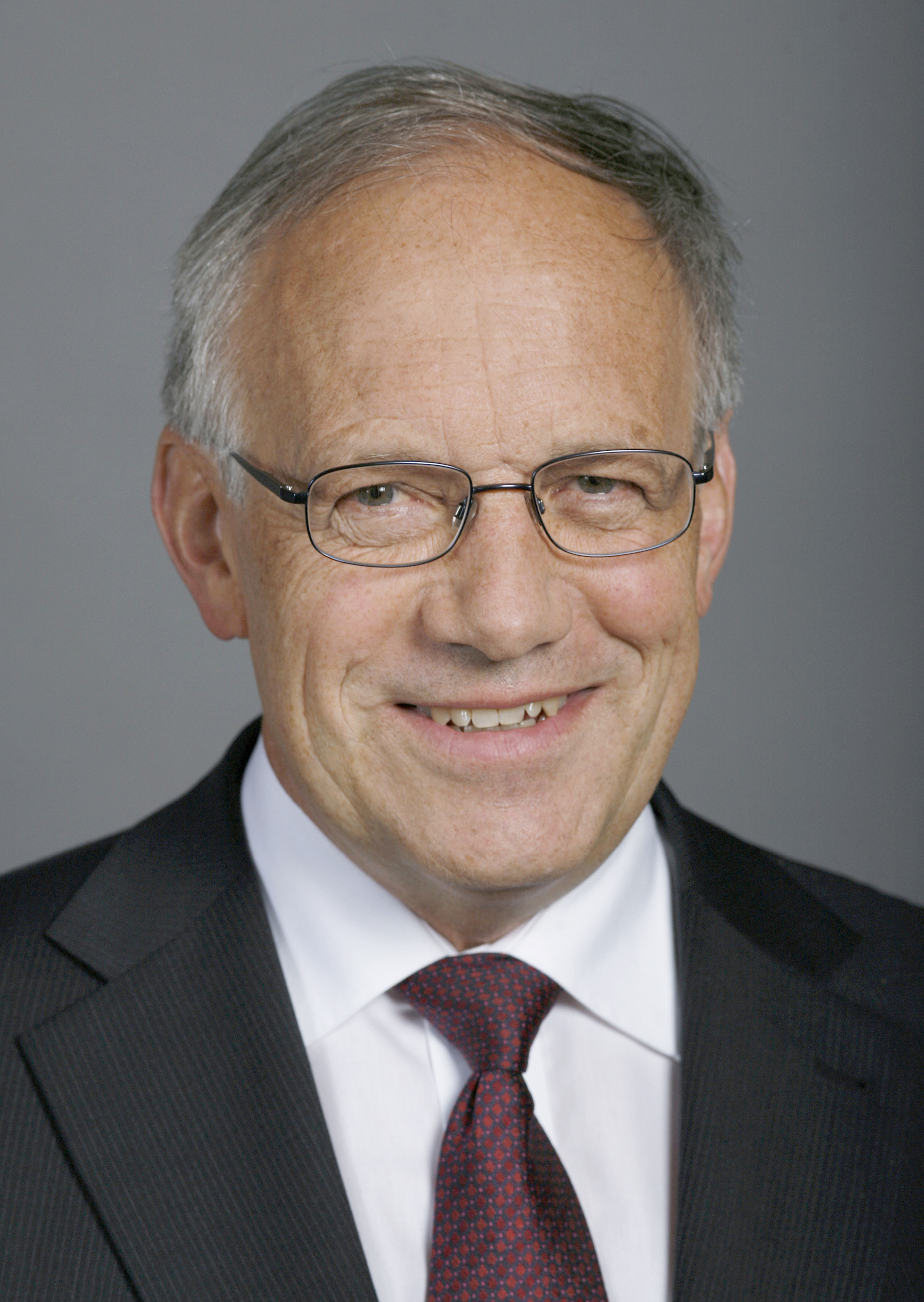
National Councillor
Johann Schneider-Ammann
from Bern

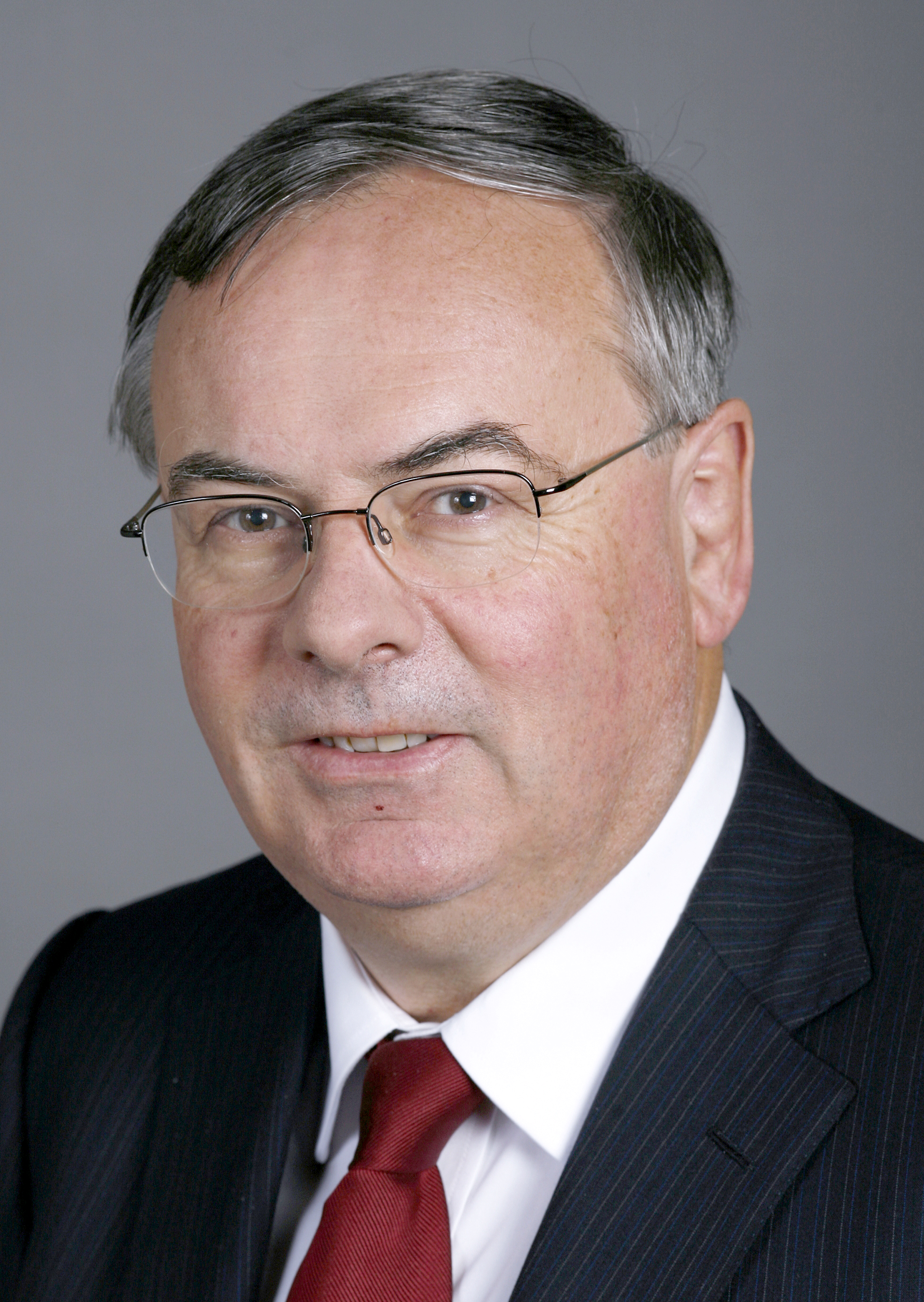
National Councillor
Jean-François Rime
from Friburg

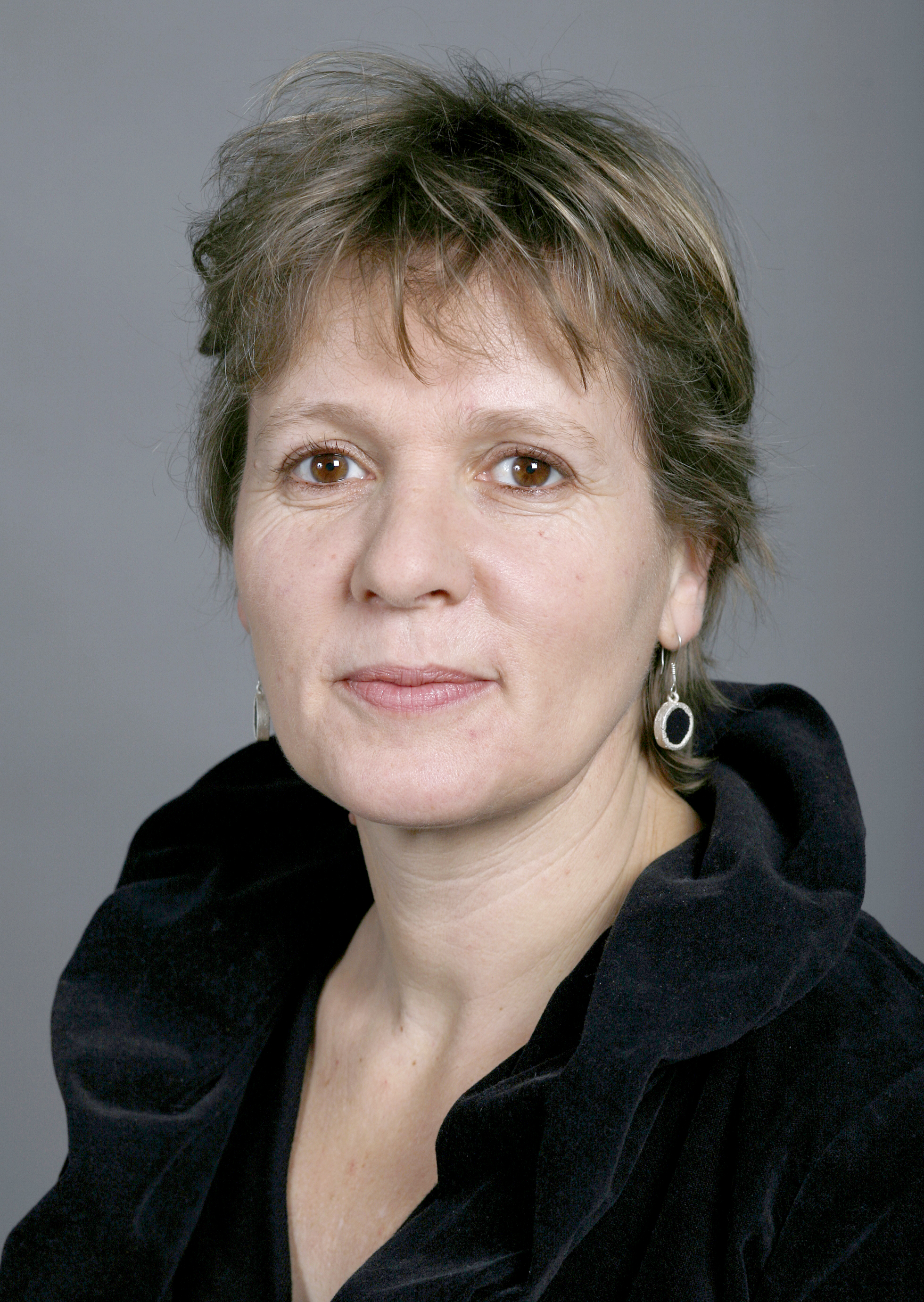
National Councillor
Brigit Wyss
from Solothurn

=== Leuenberger's seat ===
The Green Party and FDP.The Liberals have announced they will support the SP's candidate for Leuenberger's seat, while the Swiss People's Party has announced it will put up its own candidate, likely either Jean-François Rime or Adrian Amstutz (Caspar Baader was mooted as a candidate, but declined). Rime was selected as their nominee on 3 September 2010. The Christian Democratic People's Party stated it would keep its options open, but then did not nominate any candidates. The CVP later stated it would support the SP and FDP.Liberals holding their seats.

The SP's favoured candidates appeared to be Simonetta Sommaruga and Jacqueline Fehr, with Pascale Bruderer and Claude Janiak also considered possible candidates. Bruderer declined to seek the seat and Sommaruga officially announced her candidacy on 11 August 2010. Eva Herzog also announced her intention to stand, as did Hildegard Fässler. Fehr was also a candidate, which meant the SP nominated two of four women for the seat on 3 September 2010. There was speculation that the SP would support the Greens for the other seat, and it did not contest that seat.

The Green Party contested the seat of Merz, having had with three possible candidates: Geri Müller, Marlies Bänziger and Brigit Wyss. Wyss ultimately became the Green candidate for the seat.

The following were nominated as official candidates for Leuenberger's seat:

- Simonetta Sommaruga (SP-BE), States Councillor for Bern (2003–)
- Jacqueline Fehr (SP-ZH), National Councillor for Zürich (2008–)
- Jean-François Rime (SVP-FR), National Councillor for Fribourg (2003–)
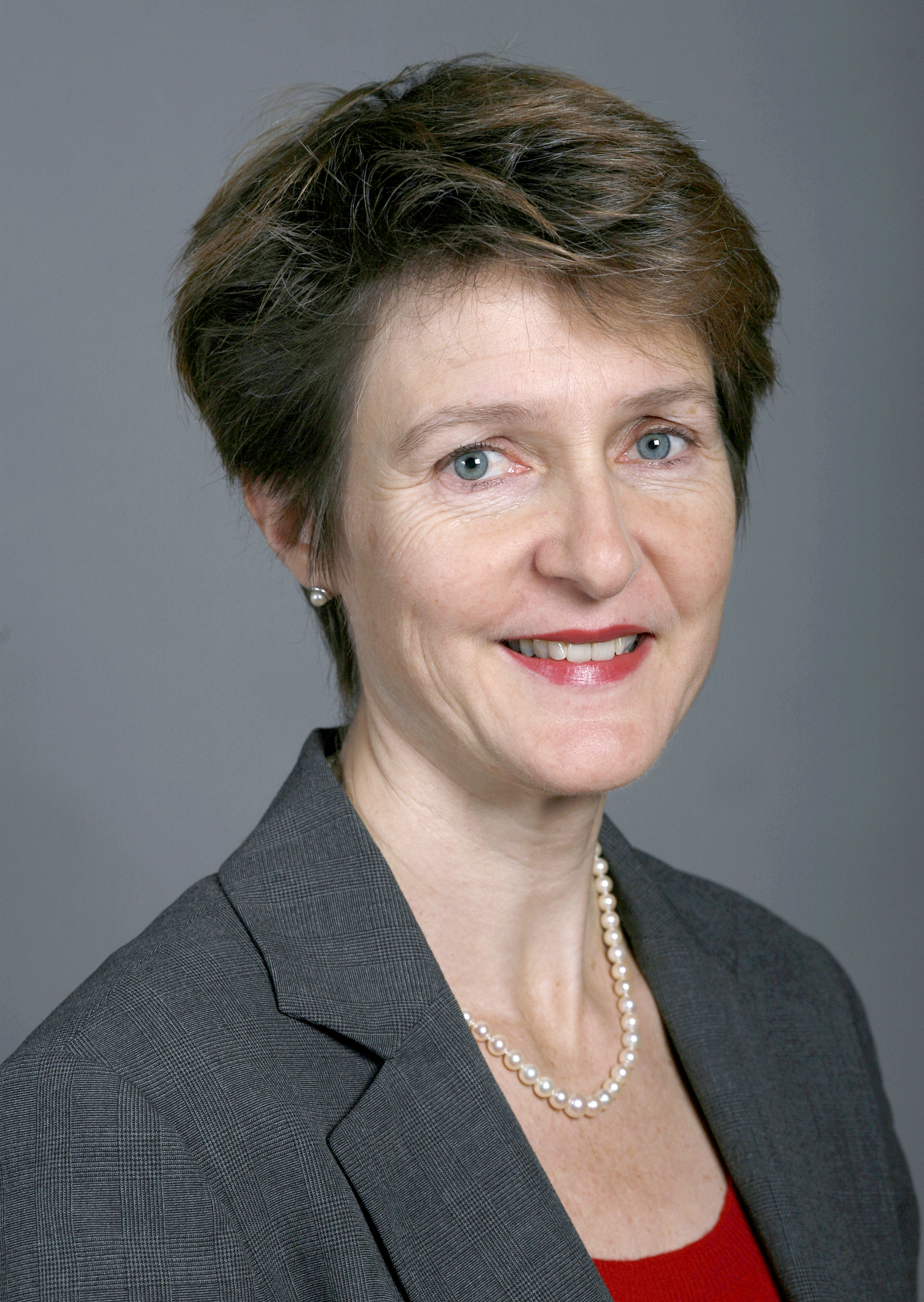
States Councillor
Simonetta Sommaruga
of Bern

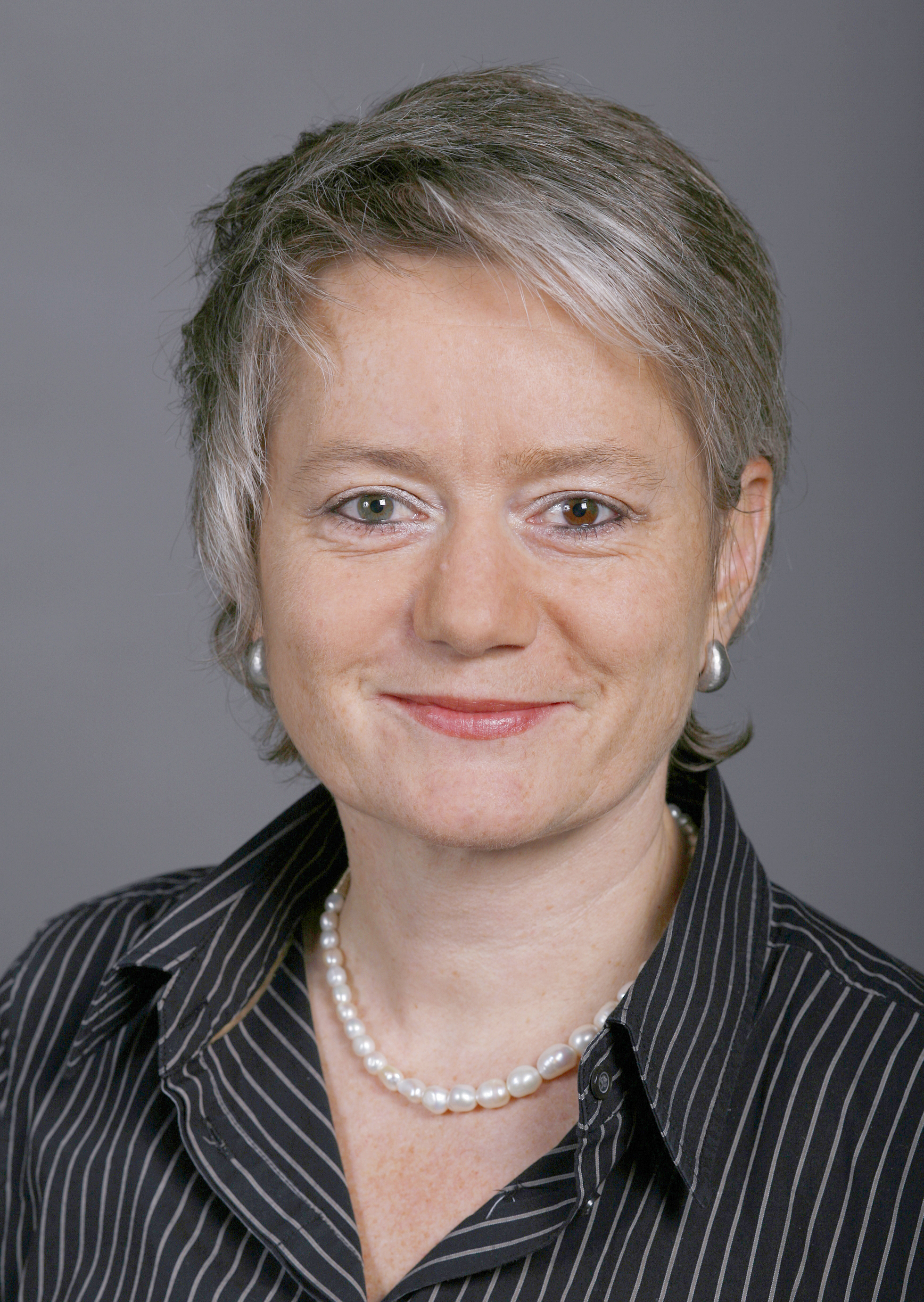
National Councillor
Jacqueline Fehr
from Zhürich

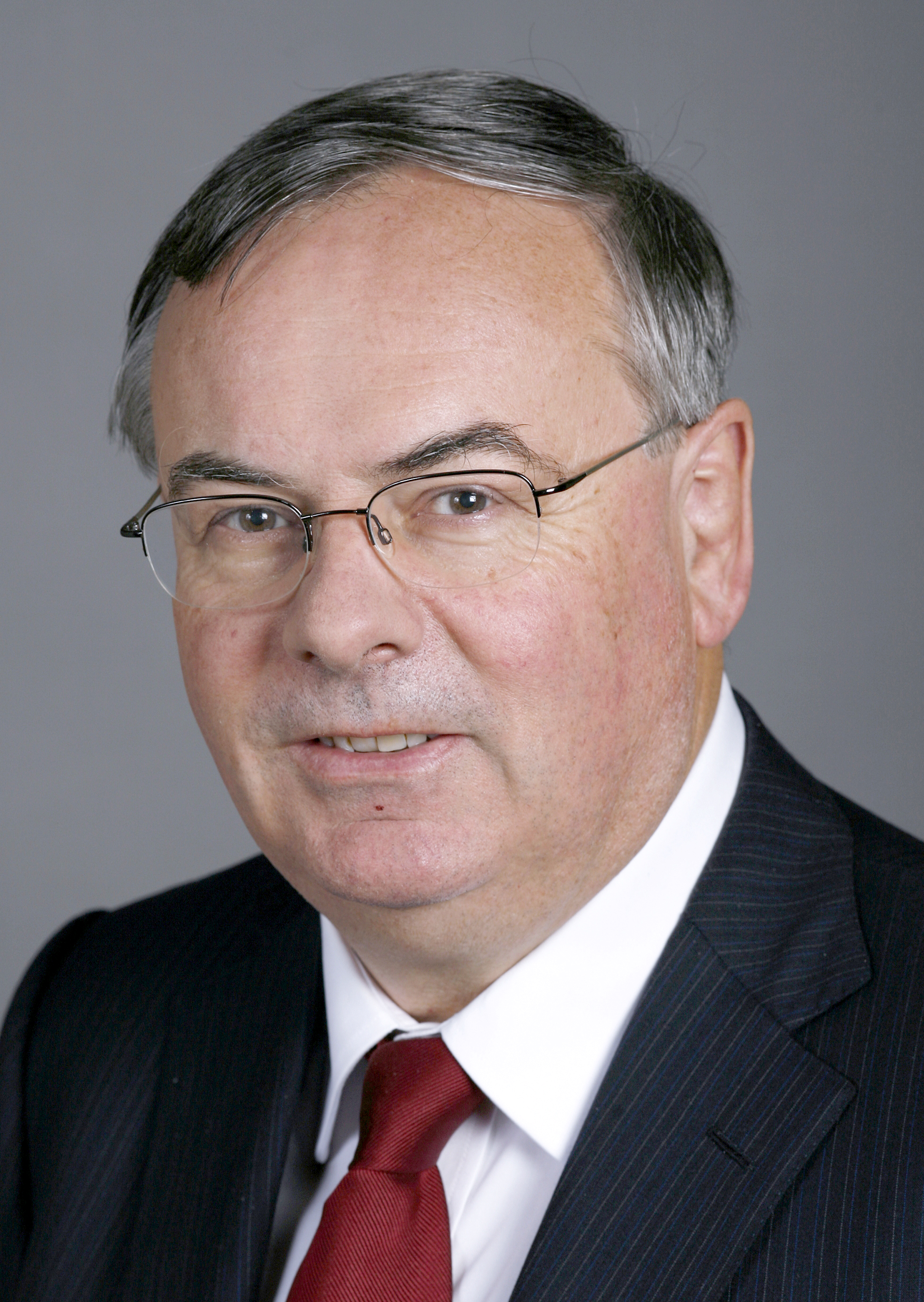
National Councillor
Jean-François Rime
from Friburg

== Results ==
=== Seat vacated by Moritz Leuenberger ===
Candidate	Party	Canton	Round 1	Round 2	Round 3	Round 4
Simonetta Sommaruga	SP	Bern	86	96	98	159
Jean-François Rime	SVP	Fribourg	80	78	77	81
Jacqueline Fehr	SP	Zurich	61	64	70	–
Hildegard Fässler	SP	St. Gallen	10	0	–	–
Votes received by other persons			7	7	–	–
Votes cast			245	245	245	245
Invalid votes			1	0	0	2
Blank votes			0	0	0	3
Valid votes			244	245	245	240
Absolute majority			123	123	123	121

=== Seat vacated by Hans-Rudolf Merz ===
Candidate	Party	Canton	Round 1	Round 2	Round 3	Round 4	Round 5
Johann Schneider-Ammann	FDP	Bern	52	75	78	84	144
Jean-François Rime	SVP	Fribourg	72	72	72	76	93
Karin Keller-Sutter	FDP	St. Gallen	44	55	66	74	–
Brigit Wyss	Green	Solothurn	57	40	28	–	–
Ignazio Cassis	FDP	Ticino	12	0	–	–	–
Votes received by other persons			7	7	–	–	–
Votes cast			245	245	245	243	245
Invalid votes			0	0	1	5	2
Blank votes			1	0	0	4	6
Valid votes			244	245	244	234	237
Absolute majority			123	123	123	118	119
