= Sylvie Perrinjaquet =

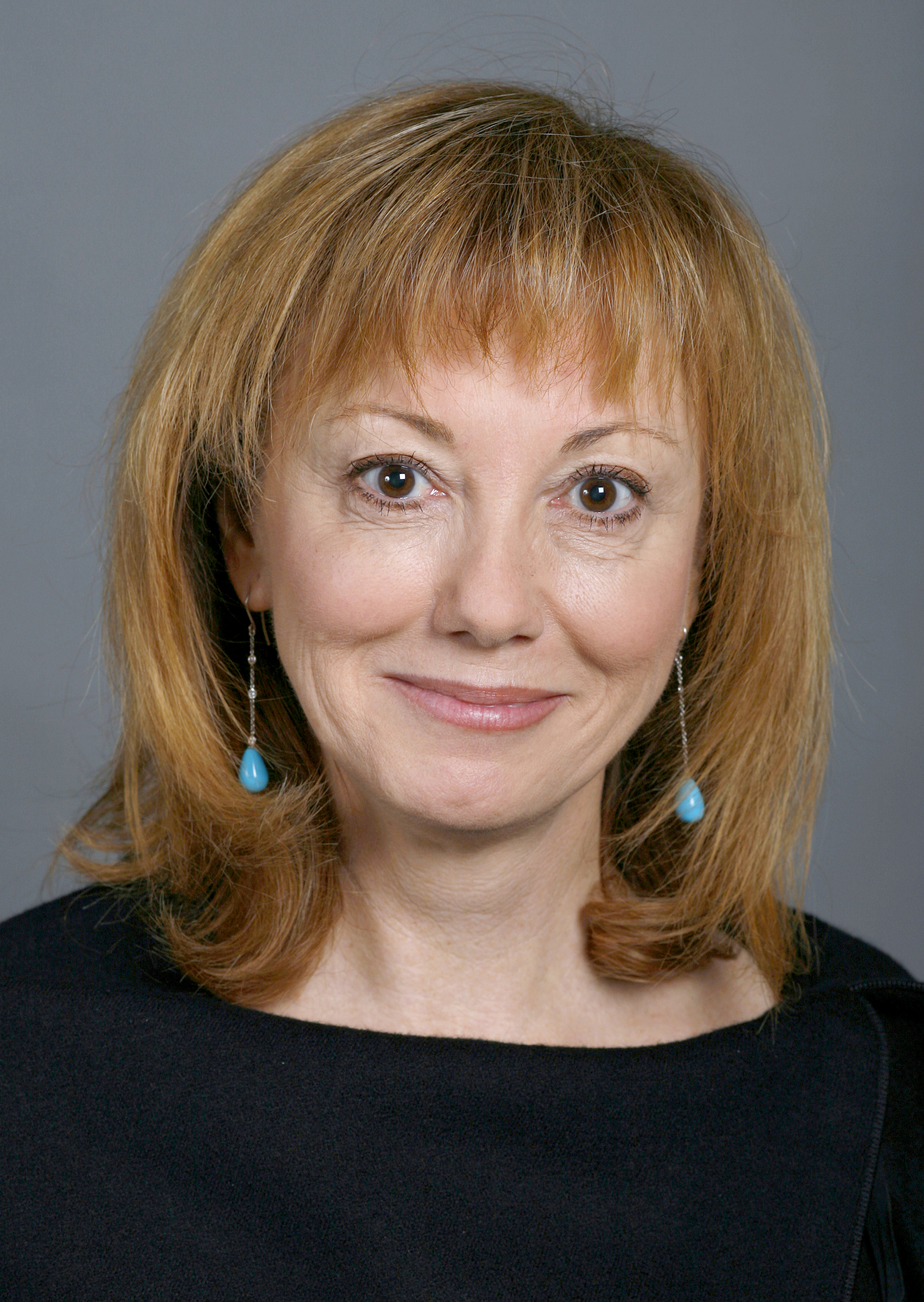

Member of the National Council of Switzerland
- In office 9 September 2013 – 29 November 2015
- In office 3 December 2007 – 4 December 2011

Personal details
- Born: 24 August 1955 (age 70) Paris, France
- Party: FDP.The Liberals
- Other political affiliations: Liberal Party of Switzerland (formerly)

Sylvie Perrinjaquet (born 24 August 1955) is a Swiss politician (FDP, formerly LPS) and lobbyist. She served as a member of the Swiss National Council.

== Biography ==
Sylvie Perrinjaquet was a member of the legislative branch of the municipality of Gorgier from 1984 to 1998 and of its executive branch from 1998 to 2000. In 1993, she was elected to the Grand Council of the Canton of Neuchâtel, where she served until 2001. From 2001 to 2009, she was a State Councillor of the Canton of Neuchâtel. Until 2005, she headed the Department of Finance and Social Affairs, and from 2005 onward, she headed the Department of Culture and Sport. In the 2007 Swiss federal election, Sylvie Perrinjaquet was elected to the National Council. There, she was a member of the Committee for Education, Science and Culture , and from 2009, of the Security Policy Committee. She resigned from the State Council in 2009. She was not re-elected to the National Council in the 2011 Swiss federal election. In September 2013, she succeeded Alain Ribaux in the National Council, who resigned on 31 August 2013. She did not run for re-election in 2015.

Since January 2016, she has worked as a lobbyist for the multinational tobacco company Philip Morris International.

Sylvie Perrinjaquet is the mother of two children.

== See also ==
- List of members of the National Council of Switzerland, 2011–2015
- List of members of the National Council of Switzerland, 2007–2011
