= Claudia Friedl =

Swiss politician (born 1960)

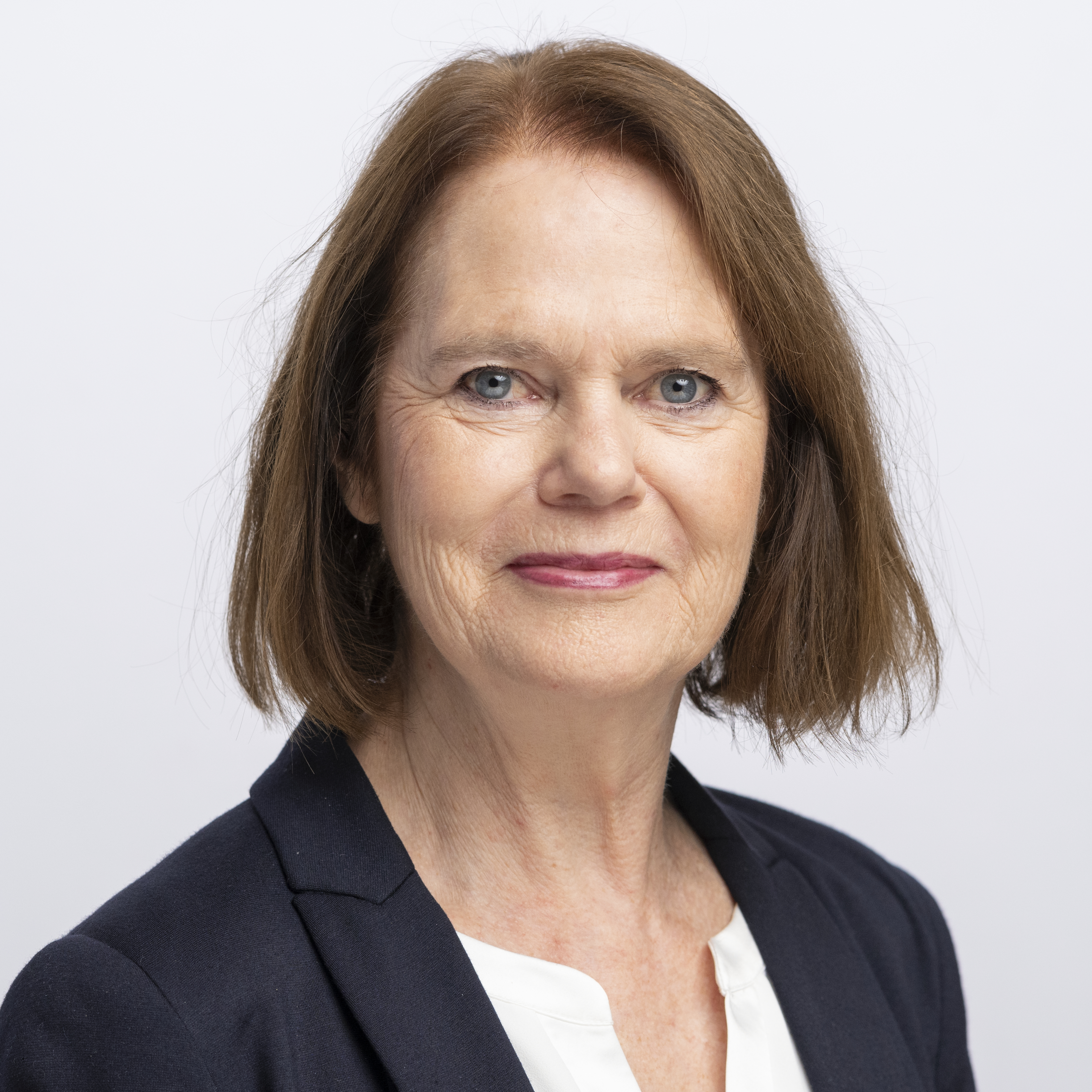
- Friedl in 2023

Member of the National Council of Switzerland
- In office 4 March 2013 – 26 April 2026
- Preceded by: Hildegard Fässler
- Succeeded by: Arbër Bullakaj

Personal details
- Born: 19 July 1960 (age 66) St. Gallen, Switzerland
- Party: Social Democratic Party of Switzerland
- Education: University of Zurich

Claudia Friedl (born 19 July 1960) is a Swiss politician (SP). From 2013 to 2026, she was a member of the National Council.

== Biography ==
An Austrian national, she grew up in St. Gallen and became a naturalized citizen in 1977. From 1976 to 1981, she attended teacher training college in Rorschach and from 1982 to 1988 studied biology at the University of Zurich. In 1996, she received her doctorate in environmental sciences from ETH Zurich under the supervision of Alexander Zehnder. From 1996 to 2007, she worked as a research associate, project manager, and deputy head of department at the Federal Office for the Environment, Forests and Landscape. Since 2007, she has owned an environmental consulting firm.

Friedl was a member of the St. Gallen City Council (legislative branch) from 1992 to 1996. From 1996 to 2013, she was a member of the Cantonal Council of St. Gallen, which she presided over in 2000/2001. From 2004 to 2012, she was president of the Social Democratic Party of the Canton of St. Gallen.

In March 2013, Friedl succeeded Hildegard Fässler in the National Council, who had resigned. She was a member of the Foreign Affairs and Finance Committees, as well as the delegations for relations with the Parliament of the Principality of Liechtenstein, for relations with the Austrian Parliament, and to the OSCE Parliamentary Assembly. She resigned her seat in the National Council on 26 April 2026. Her seat was taken by Arbër Bullakaj.

She was president of the Casafair Switzerland association and a member of the patronage committee of Aqua Viva. She is also vice president of the board of trustees of the Research Institute of Organic Agriculture.

== Publications (selection) ==
- Populationsdynamik und Reproduktionsbiologie der Bachforelle (salmo trutta fario L.) in einem hochalpinen Fliessgewässer. Dissertation, ETH Zürich, 1996 (doi:10.3929/ethz-a-001608154).
- Fischfangrückgang in schweizerischen Fliessgewässern (= Mitteilungen zur Fischerei. Nr. 63). Bundesamt für Umwelt, Wald und Landschaft, Bern 1999.

== See also ==
- List of members of the National Council of Switzerland, 2011–2015
- List of members of the National Council of Switzerland, 2015–2019
- List of members of the National Council of Switzerland, 2019–2023
- List of members of the National Council of Switzerland, 2023–2027
