= Adrian Amstutz =

Swiss politician (born 1953)

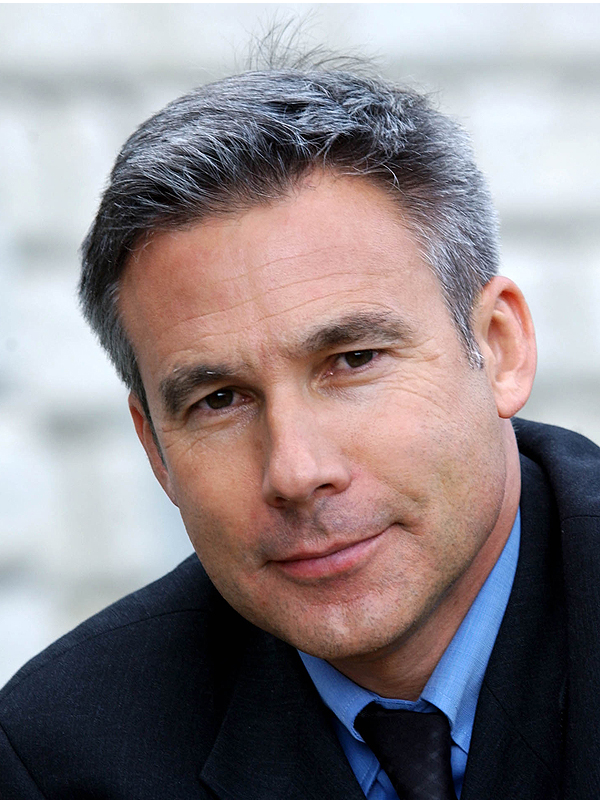
Adrian Amstutz

Adrian Amstutz (born 2 December 1953) is a Swiss politician. He was a member of the Swiss National Council from the canton of Bern from 2003 to 2019.

== Life ==
Amstutz was born and lives in the rural village of Sigriswil. As a young man, he served in the parachute reconnaissance unit of the Swiss Air Force and won the 1978 Parachuting World Cup in the parachuting/giant slalom combination discipline. Trained as an architectural draftsman and head mason, he had to abandon plans for an academic education after marrying his girlfriend, and founded his own construction planning company instead.

== Career ==
In 1993, Amstutz entered politics as mayor of Sigriswil, joining the conservative Swiss People's Party (SVP). In 1998, he was elected to the Grand Council of Bern. He joined the National Council in 2003 and was re-elected in the 2007 elections, garnering more votes than any other candidate in the canton. In 2011, he won a close runoff by-election against the Social Democratic candidate, Ursula Wyss, to succeed Simonetta Sommaruga in the Council of States. He failed to defend this seat in the general election later that year, but was elected again to the National Council.

Unlike most of his colleagues from the Bernese branch of the SVP prior to the spin-off of the Conservative Democratic Party, Amstutz's politics match the conservative course of the national party, which in 2007 caused him to be considered as a potential candidate for the Swiss Federal Council.
