= Ursula Wyss =

Swiss politician and economist

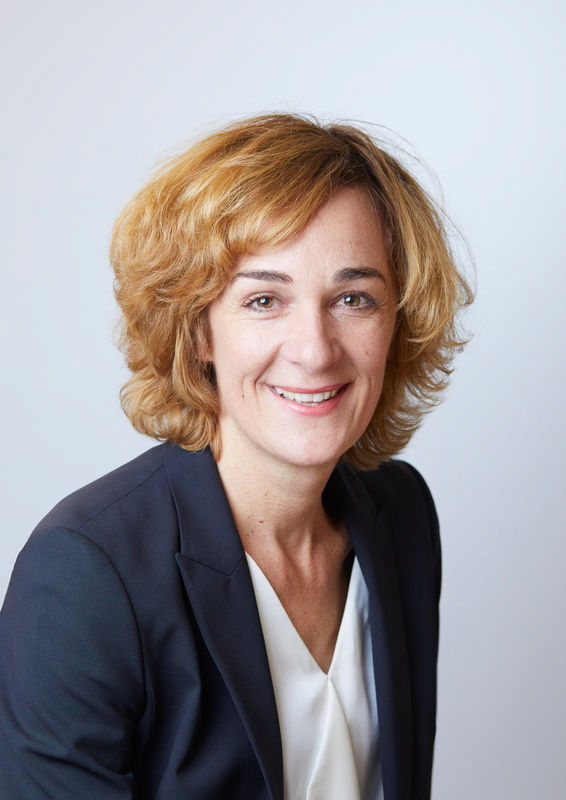
- Ursula Wyss in 2018
- In office 1999–2020

Personal details
- Born: 8 February 1973 (age 53) Davos, Canton of Graubünden, Switzerland
- Party: Social Democratic Party of Switzerland
- Spouse: Thomas Christen
- Children: 2
- Education: University of Bern
- Occupation: political economist, urban planner and politician
- Website: ursulawyss.ch (in German)

Ursula Wyss (born 8 February 1973 in Davos) is an economist, urban planner and former Swiss politician of the Social Democratic Party of Switzerland (SP).

From 1999 to 2013, she represented the Canton of Bern in the Swiss National Council. From 2013 to the end of 2020, she was a member of the executive government of the City of Bern and headed the Directorate for Civil Engineering, Transport and Green Spaces.

Today, Wyss runs her own consultancy for strategic urban development and urban mobility and works as an adviser and expert in Switzerland and elsewhere in Europe.

She is a co-author of the 2024 book Velowende. Für eine lebendige Stadt, which was published in French in 2026 as Le tournant vélo. La bicyclette pour changer la ville.

She also teaches in continuing education programmes at universities of applied sciences.

== Early life and education ==
Wyss completed her Matura at the Gymnase Numa-Droz in Neuchâtel in 1992. She subsequently studied economics and general ecology at the University of Bern, the University of Strathclyde in Glasgow and Technische Universität Berlin. She graduated from the University of Bern in 1997 and obtained a doctorate in economics (Dr. rer. oec.) in 2006. She later earned a Master of Science in Urban and Regional Planning (MSc URP) from the University of Amsterdam.

After working at the Bureau for Labour and Social Policy Studies (BASS) and WWF Switzerland, she worked at the Institute of Economics at the University of Bern.

Today, she runs SEUM, a consultancy specialising in strategic urban development and urban mobility, and works as an adviser and expert in Switzerland and elsewhere in Europe.

She is also active in higher and continuing education, including at Bern University of Applied Sciences and OST – Eastern Switzerland University of Applied Sciences.

From 2013 to 2020, Wyss chaired the board of directors of Bernmobil, Bern's municipal public transport company. She also chaired the Swiss Cities Conference on Mobility and served in an advisory capacity on the board of the Swiss Conference of Directors of Public Works, Planning and Environmental Protection.

Wyss was for many years a board member of the Bern section of the Swiss Association for Transport and Environment (VCS), a member of the patronage committee of the Energy Science Center at ETH Zurich and a member of the supporting association of the Institute of Communication and Media Studies at the University of Bern.

She chairs the Swiss Transport Foundation and, since 2026, the Alliance for Physical Activity, Sport and Health. In November 2024, she was elected to the board of Pro Velo Switzerland. She is founding member of Women in Cycling Switzerland.

== Political career ==
Wyss joined the Social Democratic Party in 1989. From 1997 to 1999, she was a member of the Grand Council of the Canton of Bern.

She was elected to the Swiss National Council in 1999 and re-elected in 2003, 2007 and 2011. From 2004 to 2006, she served as vice-president of the Social Democratic Party of Switzerland, and from 2006 to 2012 she chaired the Social Democratic parliamentary group in the Federal Assembly. She served on the Environment, Spatial Planning and Energy Committee, the Political Institutions Committee, the Finance Committee and the Office of the National Council.

During her tenure as parliamentary group leader, Wyss played a significant role in the political process that led to the non-re-election of Federal Councillor Christoph Blocher in 2007.

At national level, her political work focused particularly on environmental, climate and energy policy, European policy and education.

On 25 November 2012, Wyss was elected to the five-member executive government of the City of Bern with the highest number of votes of all elected candidates. She left the National Council in March 2013 and was succeeded by Nadine Masshardt.

In Bern's city government, Wyss headed the Directorate for Civil Engineering, Transport and Green Spaces. She was re-elected to the executive in November 2016. She left the city government at the end of 2020.

Today, she runs her own consultancy firm for strategic urban development and urban mobility.

=== Urban mobility and cycling policy in Bern ===
As a member of the city government, Wyss placed particular emphasis on walking, cycling and the quality of public space.

In 2014, Bern launched its Velo-Offensive ("Cycling Offensive"), with the goal of increasing cycling's share of trips in the city from around 11 per cent to 20 per cent by 2030. The programme combined infrastructure development with measures including main cycling routes, bicycle parking, a public bike-sharing system and initiatives to promote cycling among different population groups. The City of Bern subsequently reported that the 20 per cent target had already been reached during the 2022–2024 reporting period, meaning that cycling's share of all trips had doubled within approximately ten years.

In 2018, Bern launched what was at the time Switzerland's largest public bike-sharing system, initially comprising 700 bicycles at 70 locations and designed to expand to 2,400 bicycles at 200 locations.

Another focus of Wyss's work in the city government was the use and redesign of public space, including temporary and participatory approaches to urban spaces.

== Personal life ==
Wyss lives in Bern and has two children. Her partner is Thomas Christen.
