= Thomas de Courten =

Swiss politician (born 1966)

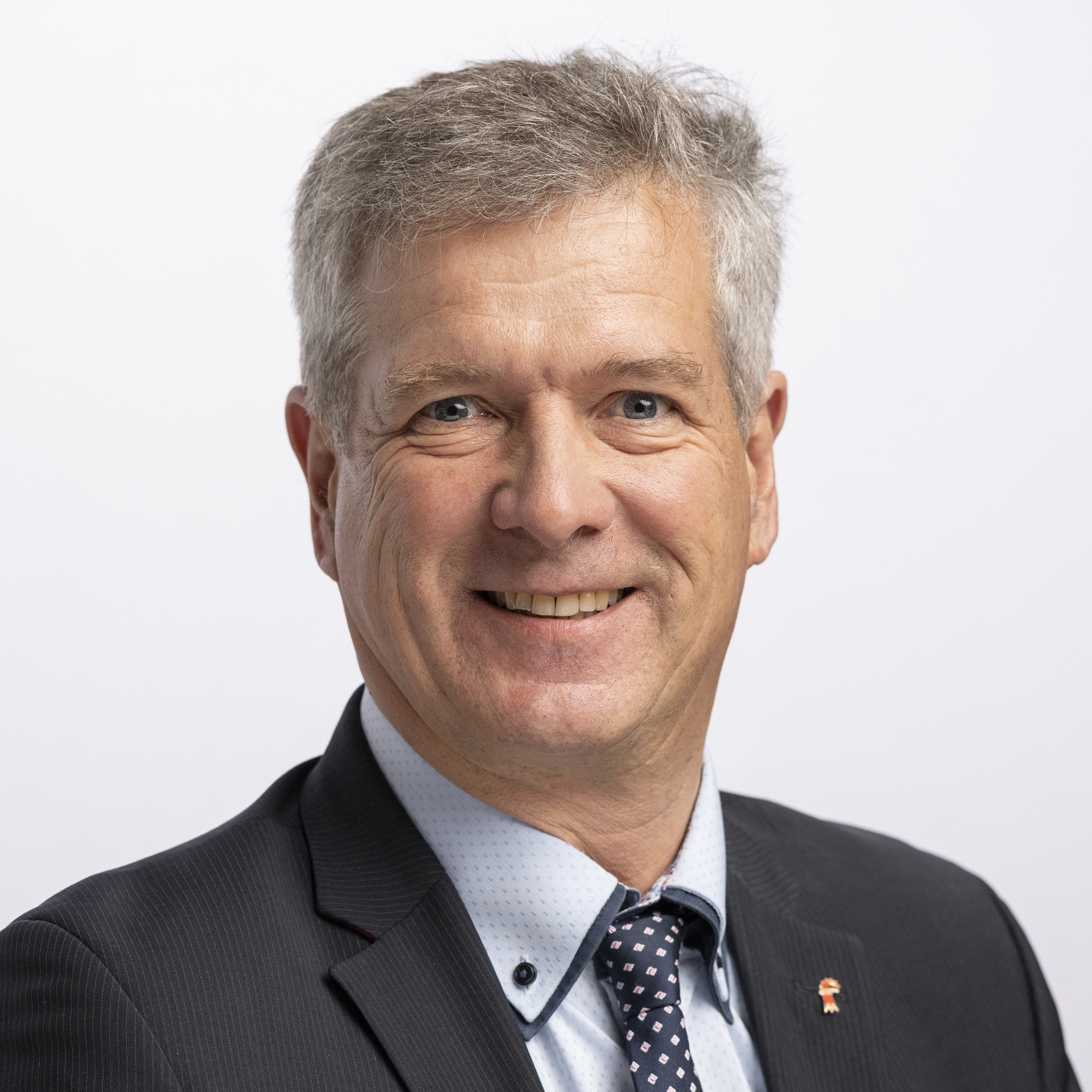
- Official portrait, 2023

Member of the National Council (Switzerland)
- Incumbent
- Assumed office 5 December 2011
- Constituency: Canton of Basel-Landschaft

Member of the Cantonal Council of Basel-Landschaft
- In office 2003–2011
- Succeeded by: Dominik Straumann

Personal details
- Born: Thomas Jan de Courten; 29 July 1966 (age 59) Basel, Switzerland
- Party: Swiss People's Party
- Spouse: Mara Etzensberger
- Children: 3
- Profession: Businessman, consultant, politician
- Website: Official website Parliament website

Military service
- Allegiance: Switzerland
- Branch/service: Swiss Armed Forces
- Rank: Lieutenant

Thomas Jan de Courten (German pronunciation: [ˈtoːmas də ˈkuʁtən]; born 29 July 1966 in Basel) is a Swiss businessman and politician who serves on the National Council (Switzerland) for the Swiss People's Party since 2011. He previously served on the Cantonal Council of Basel-Landschaft between 2003 and 2011.

== Early life and education ==
De Courten was born in Basel, Switzerland, the second of four sons, to Dr. Donald J. de Courten, an executive in the pharmaceutical industry, and his second wife Heidi de Courten (née Kjölbye). His father was employed by F. Hoffmann-La Roche and Givaudan. He has three brothers; Christophe de Courten, Georges de Courten and Alexis de Courten as well as one half-brother, Nicolas de Courten.

He is of Swiss and Danish descent. His paternal family is originally of Swiss nobility from Sierre and Geschinen in Valais. In the 1880s, his great-grandfather, a jurist and journalist, emigrated to Chicago, Illinois, where he became a naturalized American citizen in 1895. The family returned to Switzerland twice, initially in 1893, where his grandfather was born, and permanently again in 1908.

De Courten was primarily raised in Oberwil, Basel-Landschaft, where he attended the local schools. He completed his degree in economics at the HWV Basel (today University of Applied Sciences Northwestern Switzerland) in Basel, Switzerland.

== Career ==
Between 1994 and 1996, de Courten was Head of Marketing for Power Light Productions AG, before becoming a vice president for the Chamber of Commerce of Basel-Landschaft, where he was primarily responsible for the business development in small- and medium-sized enterprises. In 2015, he was appointed by the Canton of Basel-Landschaft for the efficient operation of business development in the region. Since 2005, he is also active as independent consultant and principal owner of politcom, an independent consulting firm, for political communication and public affairs in Rünenberg.

He is currently on the board of directors of Autobus AG Liestal AAGL (public transportation), Raiffeisen Liestal-Oberbaselbiet in Liestal, Sissach and Gelterkinden, Elektra Baselland (power supply) and ASGA Pension Funds. Besides politcom, he is a managing member of Salex GmbH. Additionally, he is a board director, member of trustees in several associations and private foundations.

== Politics ==
De Courten was first elected into Cantonal Council of Basel-Landschaft in 2003, a position he continued to hold until 2011. During the 2011 Swiss federal election, he was elected into National Council for the Swiss People's Party, and assumed office on 5 December 2011. He is co-president of the commissions 'Municipal and Cooperations' and 'for independent weapon rights'.

He was a candidate in the 2015 Swiss Federal Council election, but was not elected. His nomination brought him the title 'self proclaimed Kennedy' by Tagesanzeiger. The seat was awarded to incumbent Guy Parmelin. In 2022, after the resignation of Ueli Maurer, he made comments that his constituency should have a seat, but he didn't seek nomination in the end.

== Personal life ==
De Courten married Mara Caren Etzensberger, with whom he has three children;

- Aline Florence de Courten
- Florin Benjamin de Courten
- Renée Sophie de Courten

He resides in Rünenberg near Liestal, Switzerland.
