= Martin Landolt =

Swiss politician (born 1968)

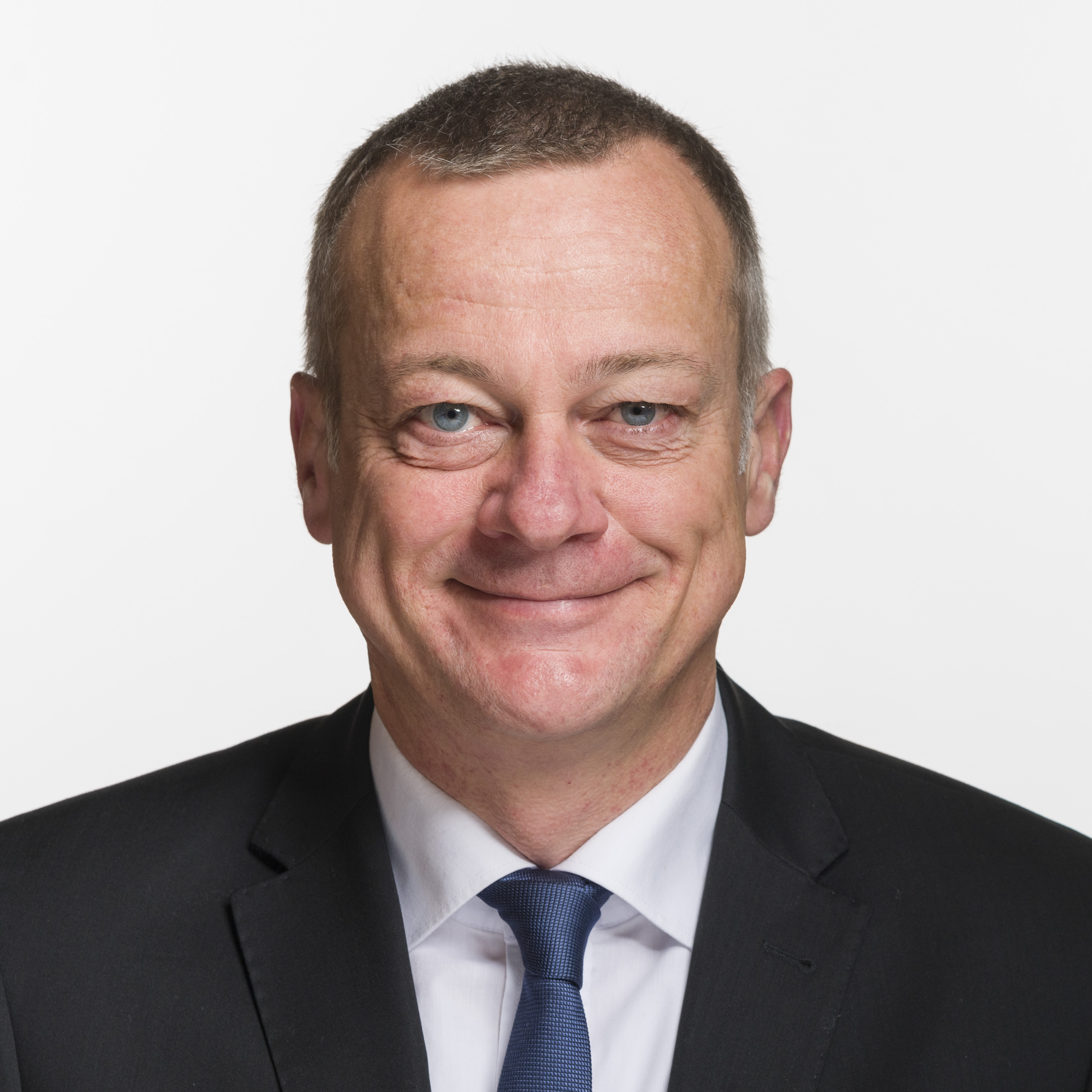

Member of the National Council of Switzerland
- In office 2 March 2009 – 3 December 2023

Leader of the Conservative Democratic Party of Switzerland
- In office 5 May 2012 – 31 December 2020
- Preceded by: Hans Grunder
- Succeeded by: Position abolished

Member of the Landrat of Glarus
- In office 1998 – 19 May 2008

Vice President of the Swiss People's Party of Glarus
- In office 2003 – 19 May 2008

Group Leader of the Swiss People's Party in the Landrat of Glarus
- In office 2001–2005

Chairman of the Landrat of Glarus
- In office 2006–2007

Personal details
- Born: 30 June 1968 (age 58) Näfels, Switzerland
- Party: Swiss People's Party (before 2008); Conservative Democratic Party (2008–2021); The Centre (2021–present)

Martin Landolt (born 30 June 1968 in Näfels; Place of origin in Glarus Nord) is a Swiss politician and member of the Swiss National Council for the Conservative Democratic Party of Switzerland (BDP). From May 2012 to December 2020, he served as the President of the BDP.

== Career ==
Landolt completed an apprenticeship at the Glarner Kantonalbank. Later he completed a part-time diploma in economics. From November 2010 until October 2013 he worked at UBS as a political advisor.

== Politics ==
Landolt was elected to the Landrat of the Canton of Glarus in 1998 as a member of the Swiss People's Party (SVP). From 2003 to 2008 he was vice-president of the Glarus branch of the SVP. He was President of the Landrat for the year 2006–2007. On 19 May 2008 he announced his resignation as vice-president and his departure from the party, claiming that the party no longer reflected his liberal values, finding fault with the party's style, and accusing it of a lack of fairness in internal disputes. His departure from the party came in the context of the SVP's expulsion of its Grisons branch after it refused to expel Federal Councillor Eveline Widmer-Schlumpf from the party.

In July 2008 he assumed the presidency of the "Liberal group" in the Glarus Landrat. On 28 August 2008, with around 100 others, he co-founded the Conservative Democratic Party of Glarus Canton: he was selected as party president, a role which he retained until April 2012. In October 2008, he participated in the establishment of the national BDP and he was elected to the National Council under the BDP banner on 8 February 2009 in the by-election which followed the resignation of Werner Marti. With his election, the BDP passed the threshold required to qualify as a parliamentary group and from spring 2009 it formed its own group in the Federal Assembly. Landolt was sworn in as a National Councillor on 2 March 2009. He served on the Committee for Finance (CdF-N), until December 2011. After he was re-elected to the National Council in the 2011 elections, he served on the Committee for Political Institutions (CIP-N) and the Committee for Transport and Telecommunications (CTT-N).

On 5 May 2012, Landolt was elected by acclamation as the new President of the BDP, succeeding Hans Grunder.

Landolt made a notable social policy step in June 2014, when he announced the BDP's support for same-sex marriage and LGBT adoption, simultaneously denouncing the SVP for homophobia. This announcement made the BDP the first Swiss right-of-center party to make completely equal rights for members of the LGBT community official party policy.

After numerous election defeats for the BDP, Landolt became one of the leading drivers of the merger of his party and the Christian Democratic People's Party on 1 January 2021 to form The Centre. After the merger, Landolt did not retain any party office in the new Centre party and did not seek reelection in the 2023 Federal Elections in order to focus on his new role as president of Santésuisse, the umbrella organization of Swiss health-insurers.

== Personal life ==
Landolt is separated from his wife and is father to three daughters. He lives in Näfels.

== Bibliography ==
- Martin Landolt on the website of the Federal Assembly (27 August 2013).
