= Brigit Wyss =

Swiss green party politician (born 1960)

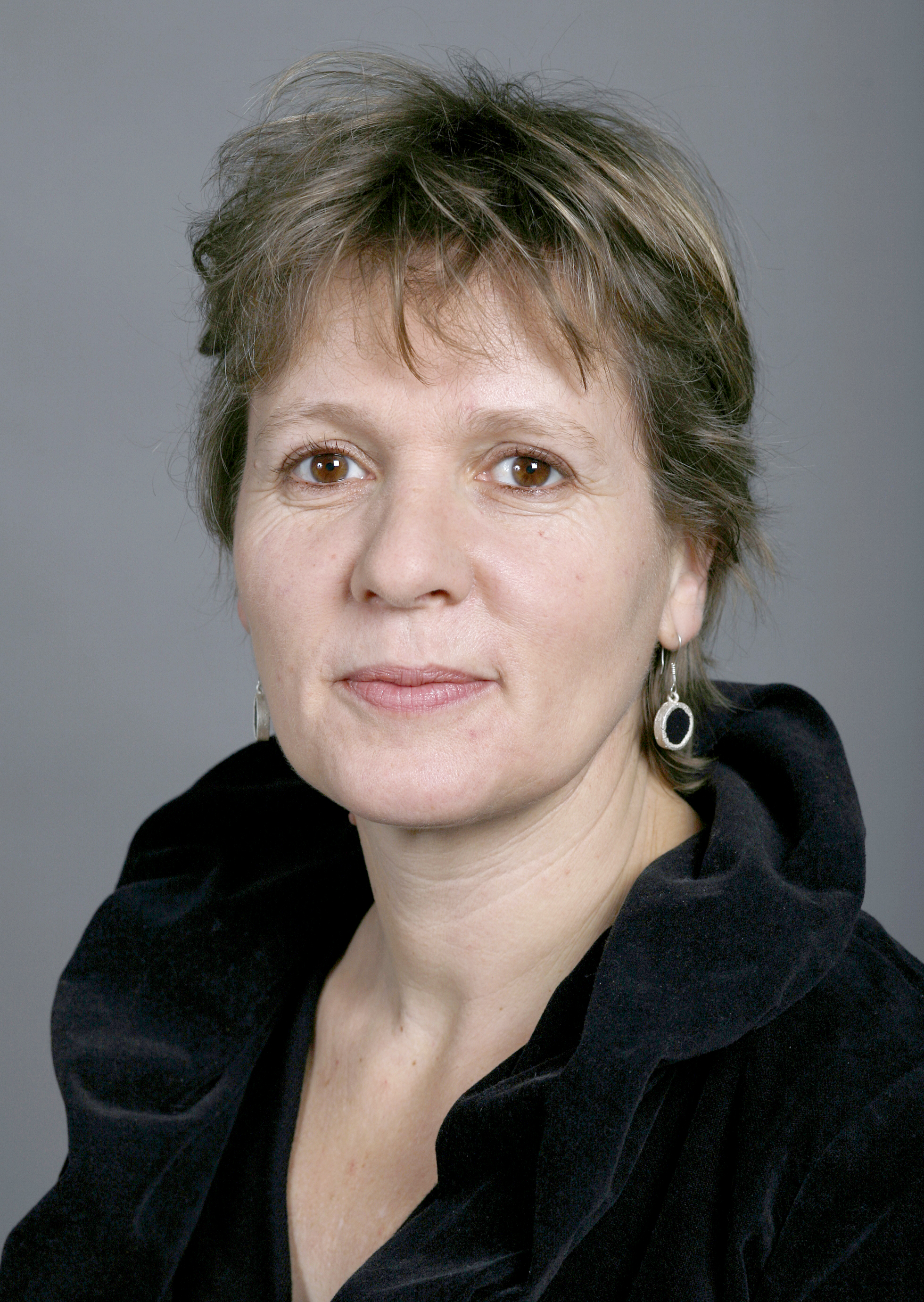

Brigit Wyss (born 1960) is a Swiss politician of the Green Party of Switzerland.

== Early life and education ==
Wyss was born on 22 April 1960 in Lüsslingen, Canton of Solothurn, Switzerland, in a farming family. She trained as a carpenter, and then as a psychiatric nurse, before studying law at the University of Bern from 1994 to 2000.

== Political career ==
She was a member of the National Council from 3 December 2007 to 4 December 2011. Before and after this she was a member of the Cantonal Council of Solothurn, from 2005 to 2007 and 2013 to 2017. Since 2017 she has been Regierungsrätin in the Economics department (Volkswirtschaftsdepartement) of the Canton of Solothurn.
