= Jean-François Rime =

Swiss politician

Jean-François Rime lic. ès sc. éc.
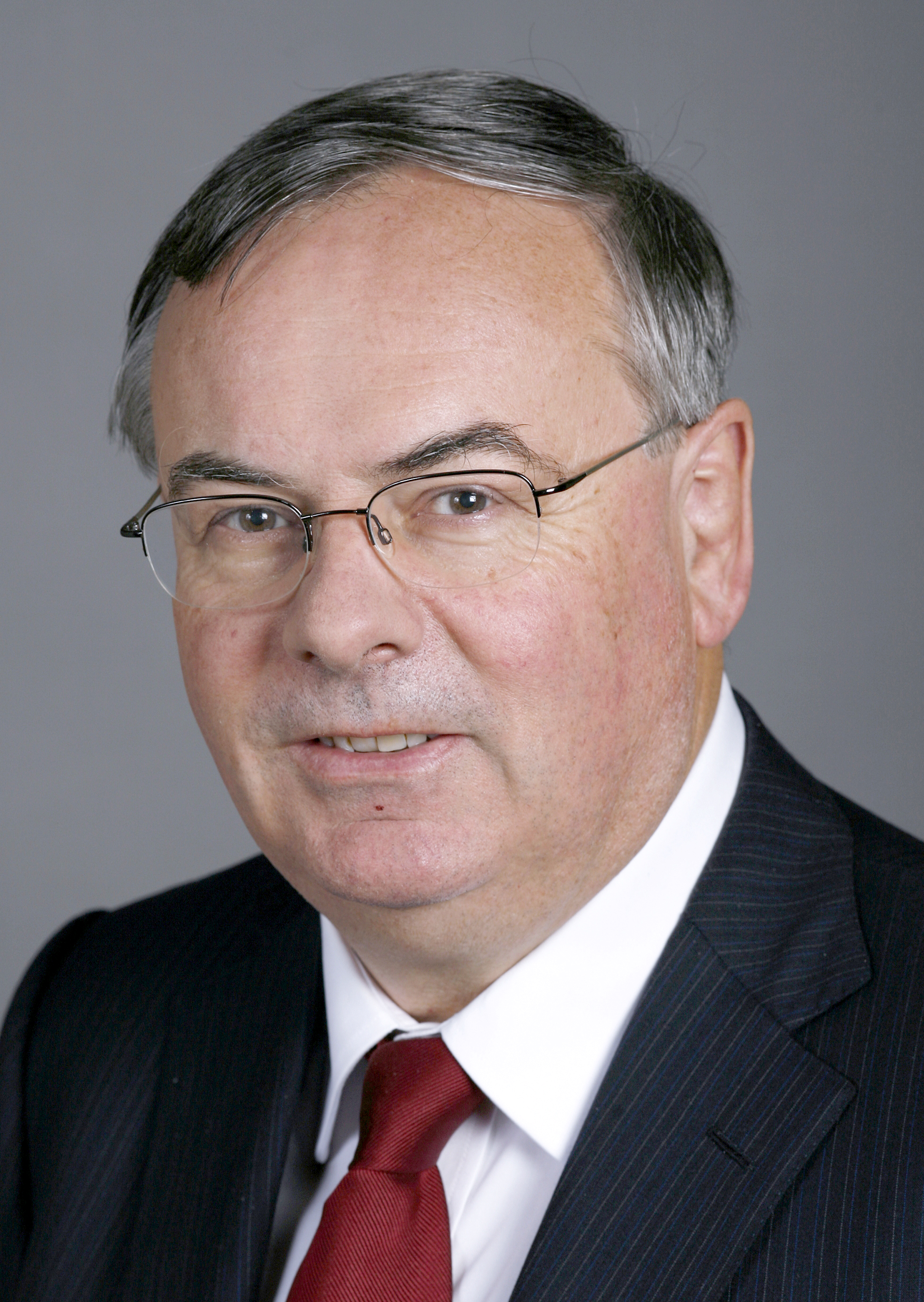
- Jean-François Rime (2007)

Member of the Swiss National Council
- Incumbent
- Assumed office 1 December 2003
- Constituency: Canton of Fribourg

Personal details
- Born: 28 June 1950 Fribourg
- Party: Swiss People's Party
- Children: 3
- Occupation: Entrepreneur

Military service
- Rank: Private

Jean-François Rime (born 28 June 1950) is a Swiss entrepreneur and politician from the Canton of Fribourg, representing the Swiss People's Party in the National Council.

Rime owns a sawmill in Bulle. As a member of the Free Democratic Party, he belonged to the municipal parliament of Bulle from 1989 to 1991. After joining the Swiss People's Party, he was elected to the national parliament in 2003. Since his reelection in 2007, he is vice president of the party's parliamentary group.

In August 2008, the People's Party announced Rime's candidature in the 2010 Swiss Federal Council election.

== See also ==
- Swiss Union of Arts and Crafts
