= Hansjörg Knecht =

Swiss politician

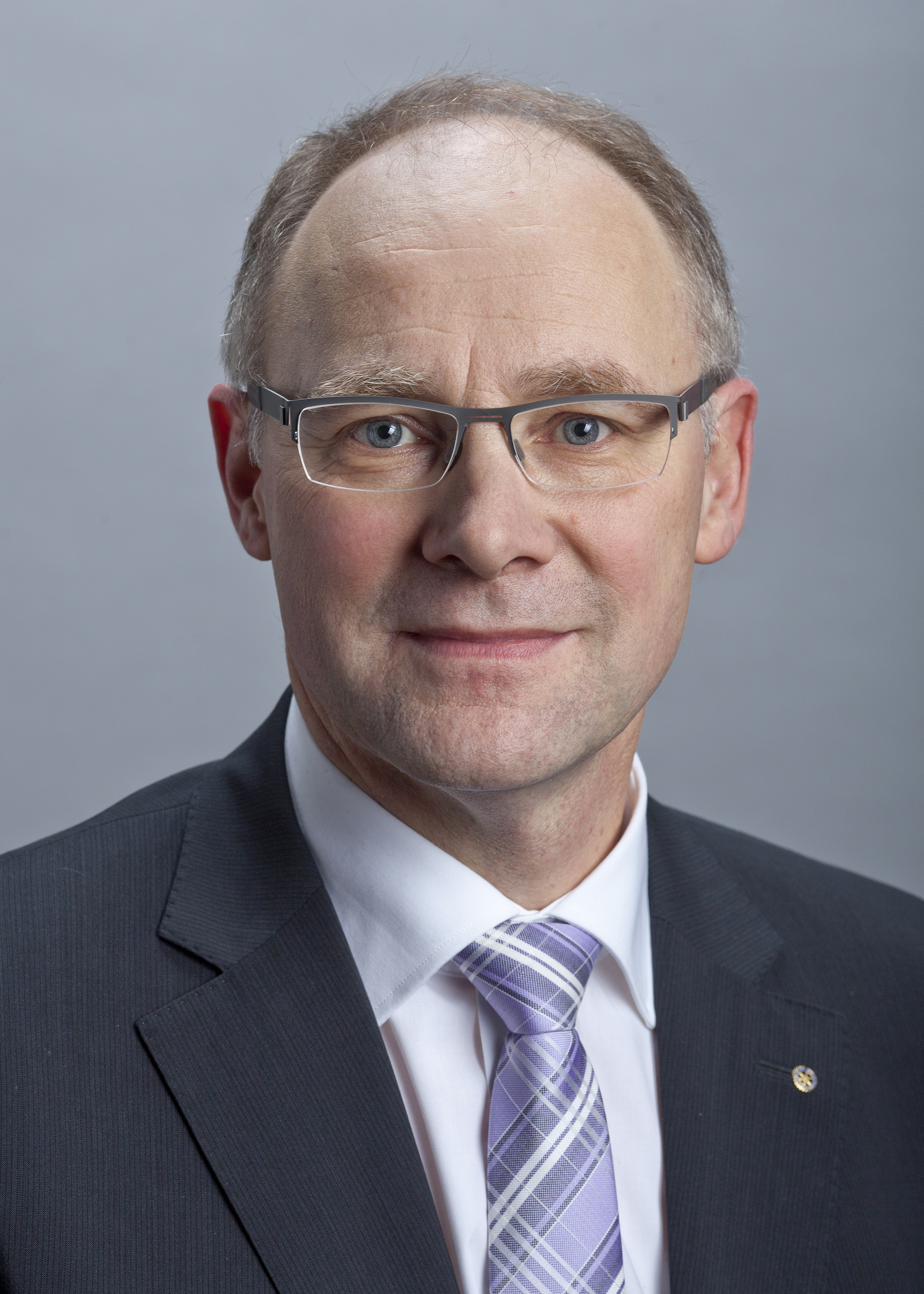

Member of the Council of States of Switzerland
- Incumbent
- Assumed office 2 December 2019
- Constituency: Aargau

Member of the National Council
- In office 2011 – 1 December 2019

Personal details
- Born: 24 March 1960 (age 66)

Hansjörg Knecht is a Swiss politician who is a member of the Council of States of Switzerland.

== Biography ==
Knecht worked as an entrepreneur before entering politics.
