= Nadja Pieren =

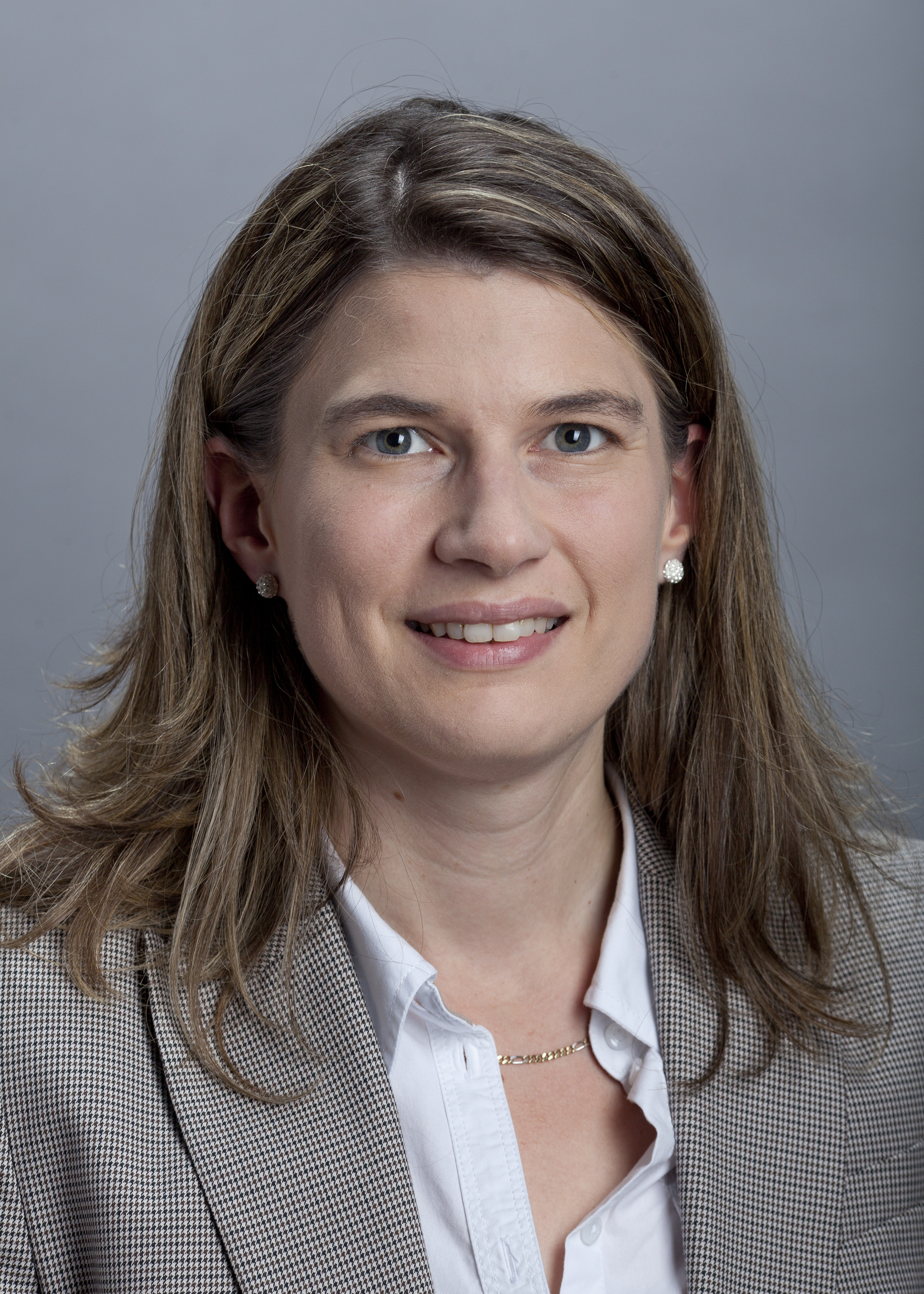
- Official portrait, 2019

Member of the National Council (Switzerland)
- Incumbent
- Assumed office 5 December 2011

Member of the Grand Council of Bern
- In office 2010–2011

Personal details
- Born: Nadja Pieren; 14 February 1980 (age 46) Bern, Switzerland
- Occupation: Businesswoman, politician
- Website: Official website (in German)

Nadja Umbricht stylized Umbricht-Pieren (née Pieren; born 14 February 1980) is a Swiss businesswoman and politician. She currently serves as a member of the National Council (Switzerland) for the Swiss People's Party since 2011. Since 2010, she also served as vice president of the Swiss People's Party on the federal level resigning in 2016. Pieren previously served on the Grand Council of Bern from 2010 to 2011 and as member of the municipal council of Burgdorf.
