= Hans Grunder =

Swiss politician (born 1956)

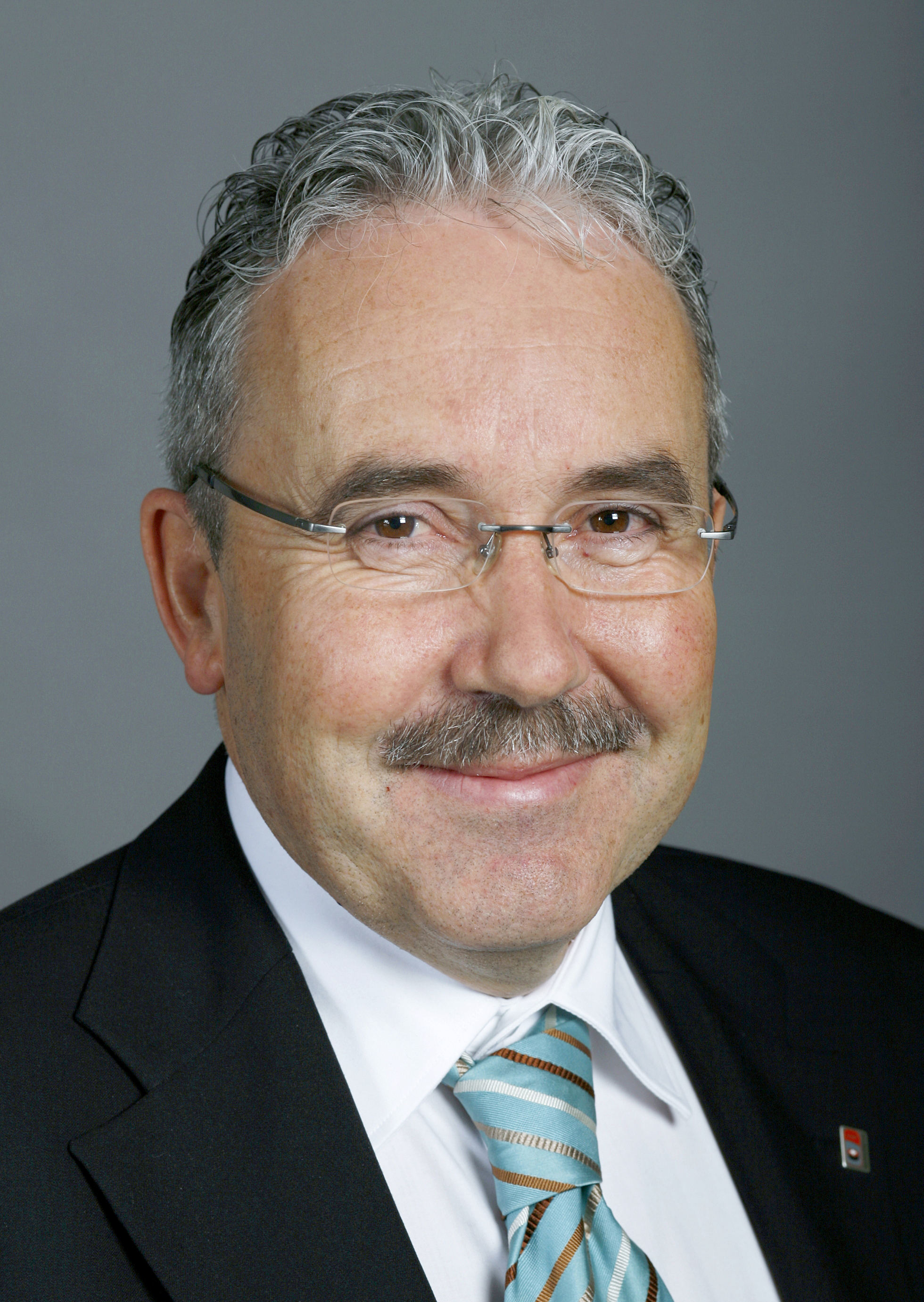
Hans Grunder

Hans Grunder (born 13 June 1956 in Rüderswil; in Vechigen) is a Swiss politician of the Conservative Democratic Party of Switzerland (BDP).

== Life ==
Hans Grunder lives in Rüegsau. He comes from a rural family, is married and has five children. Since 1987, he has been the owner of an international survey-consulting company with around 140 staff. He is also known regionally (and not uncontroversially) as the president of the SCL Tigers. Since 2001, he has also worked with his family on his own horse breeding farm.

In 1999, Grunder was elected as a representative of the Swiss People's Party (SVP) in the Grand Council of Bern. He was vice-president of the Trachselwald District branch of the SVP, from November 1999 until November 2006. After that he was President of the same branch until 2008. In the 2007 Swiss federal election he won a seat in the National Council.

Grunder was co-founder of the BDP of the Canton of Bern. On 1 November 2008, he was elected party president at the inaugural general meeting of the BDP as a national party. In the 2011 federal election he was re-elected to the National Council. On 5 May 2012, Grunder resigned from the position of party president His successor was Martin Landolt.

After suffering two strokes, in march 2019 Grunder announced he would be stepping down from the surveying and engineering firm he founded which is now part of BKW. He has since started a consulting business.

In the 2019 federal elections, Grunder did not seek reelection to the National Council
