= Hildegard Fässler =

Swiss politician (1951–2026)

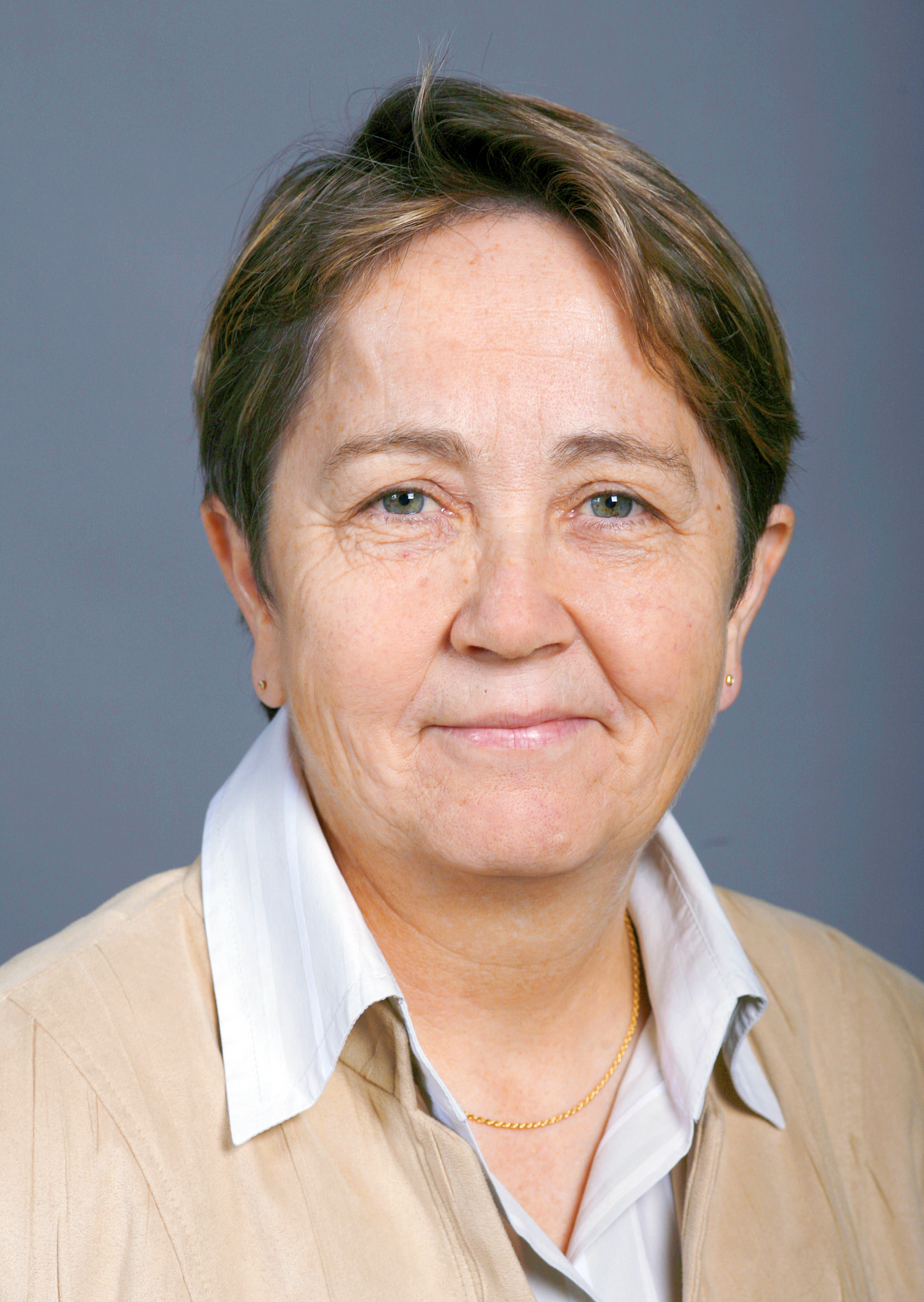
- Fässler in 2007

Member of the National Council
- In office 3 March 1997 – 3 March 2013
- Preceded by: Kathrin Hilber
- Succeeded by: Claudia Friedl

Member of the St. Gallen Cantonal Council
- In office 1992 – 30 September 1996

Personal details
- Born: 22 June 1951 Frauenfeld, Switzerland
- Died: 17 June 2026 (aged 74)
- Party: Social Democratic Party
- Spouse: Peter Fässler (m. 1976)
- Education: University of Zurich

Hildegard Fässler-Osterwalder (22 June 1951 – 17 June 2026) was a Swiss politician from the Social Democratic Party of Switzerland (SP). She was a member of the National Council for the canton of St. Gallen from 1997 to 2013, including a tenure as leader of the Socialist bloc from 2002 to 2006.

== Life and career ==
Fässler attended elementary school in Steckborn and then went on to teacher training college in Kreuzlingen. She graduated as a primary school teacher in 1972. She then studied mathematics at the University of Zurich until 1977. After receiving her diploma, she continued her training as a secondary school teacher (diploma for higher education teaching) at the University of Zurich, graduating in 1980. From 1979 to 2000, she was a mathematics teacher at the Heerbrugg Cantonal School.

She joined the SP Werdenberg in 1980 and ran for the Cantonal Council of St. Gallen for the first time in 1988. She was not elected at that time. From 1990 to 1996 she was a member of the executive board of the SP Werdenberg. In 1991 she first ran for the National Council. From 1992 until her resignation on 30 September 1996 she was a member of the St. Gallen Cantonal Council. In the 1995 Swiss federal election she ran for the National Council for the second time and for the Council of States for the first time. From 1996 to May 2001 she was Vice President of the SP in the Canton of St. Gallen. On 3 March 1997, she succeeded National Councillor Kathrin Hilber, who stepped down on 31 December 1996. From December 1999 to June 2002, she served as vice-president of the SP parliamentary group and then as group president until 2006. From 19 May 2001, to 19 June 2004, she was also president of the SP in the canton of St. Gallen.

Fässler resigned from her National Council seat on 3 March 2013. She justified her decision by stating that she had been in the National Council for 16 years (four legislative periods), and that this was a good period of time to step down. Furthermore, her husband had been retired for three years, and she wanted to spend more time with him. Claudia Friedl succeeded Fässler in the National Council.

From 2012 to 2020 she was a member of the University Council of the University of St. Gallen.

She was married to Peter Fässler, a lecturer at the Interstate University of Applied Sciences NTB Buchs, since 1976 and lived in Grabs in the St. Gallen Rhine Valley.

Fässler was president of the Swiss House Association (Casafair).

Fässler died on 17 June 2026, at the age of 74.

== See also ==
- List of members of the National Council of Switzerland, 2003–2007
- List of members of the National Council of Switzerland, 2007–2011
- List of members of the National Council of Switzerland, 2011–2015
