= Jacqueline Fehr =

Swiss politician (born 1963)

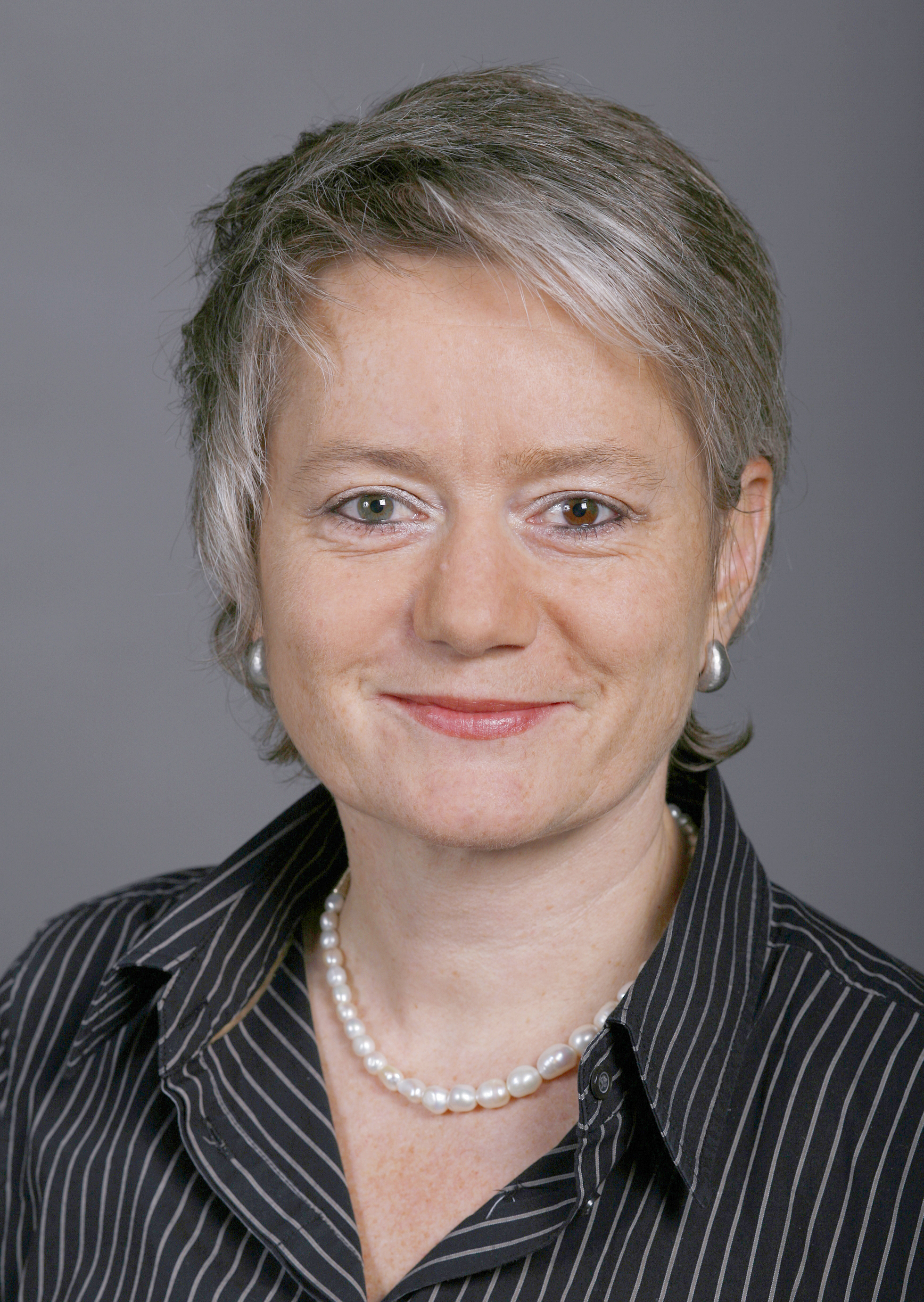
- Jacqueline Fehr (2007)

Member of 45th (1995-1999) 46th (1999-2003) 47th (2003-2007) 48th Swiss Federal Assembly(2007-2011)
- Incumbent
- Assumed office 27 April 1998

Personal details
- Born: 1 June 1963 (age 62) Wallisellen
- Party: SP
- Occupation: Enseignante

Jacqueline Fehr (born 1 June 1963) is a Swiss politician of the Social Democratic Party of Switzerland. She represents the Canton of Zürich in the Swiss National Council.

== Professional career ==
Born in Wallisellen, Jacqueline Fehr grew up in Elgg and Winterthur. After obtaining her matura, she trained as a schoolteacher and taught in Zürich schools from 1988 to 1994. She took up, but did not complete, studies in psychology, business and political science.

She worked as an official in the department of schools and sport of the city of Winterthur from 1994 to 1996. In 1997, she took up work as a private consultant, coach and professional trainer. From 1992 to 1996, she was president of the federation of Zürich trade unions.

== Political career ==
A member of the Social Democratic party since 1986, Jacqueline Fehr served in the municipal parliament of Winterthur from 1990 to 1992 and in the Grand Council of Zürich from 1991 to 1998. She became a member of the National Council in 1998 and was reelected in 1999, 2003 and 2007.

In the National Council, she serves on the committees for Social Security and Health, Transports and Telecommunications, and has previously served on the committees for Science, Education, Culture and Security. A ranking of the SonntagsZeitung listed her as the Swiss federal parliament's most influential member in 2009.

On 26 August 2010, she announced her candidacy to succeed Moritz Leuenberger in the 2010 Swiss Federal Council election.

Fehr is vice president of her party and was also, from 1997 to 2001, co-president of the Swiss Social Democrat Women. She presides over the Swiss Foundation for the Protection of Children and of the bicycle advocacy organization Pro Velo Suisse.

== Private life ==
Jacqueline Fehr was married to Maurice Pedergnana and has two children born in 1994 and 1996.

== Publications ==
- Luxus Kind? Vorschläge für eine neue Familienpolitik, Orell Füssli Verlag, Zürich, 2003, ISBN 3-280-05027-8
- Schule mit Zukunft. Pladoyer für ein modernes Bildungssystem, Orell Füssli Verlag, Zürich, 2009, ISBN 978-3-280-05320-1}
