= Nadine Masshardt =

Swiss politician (born 1984)

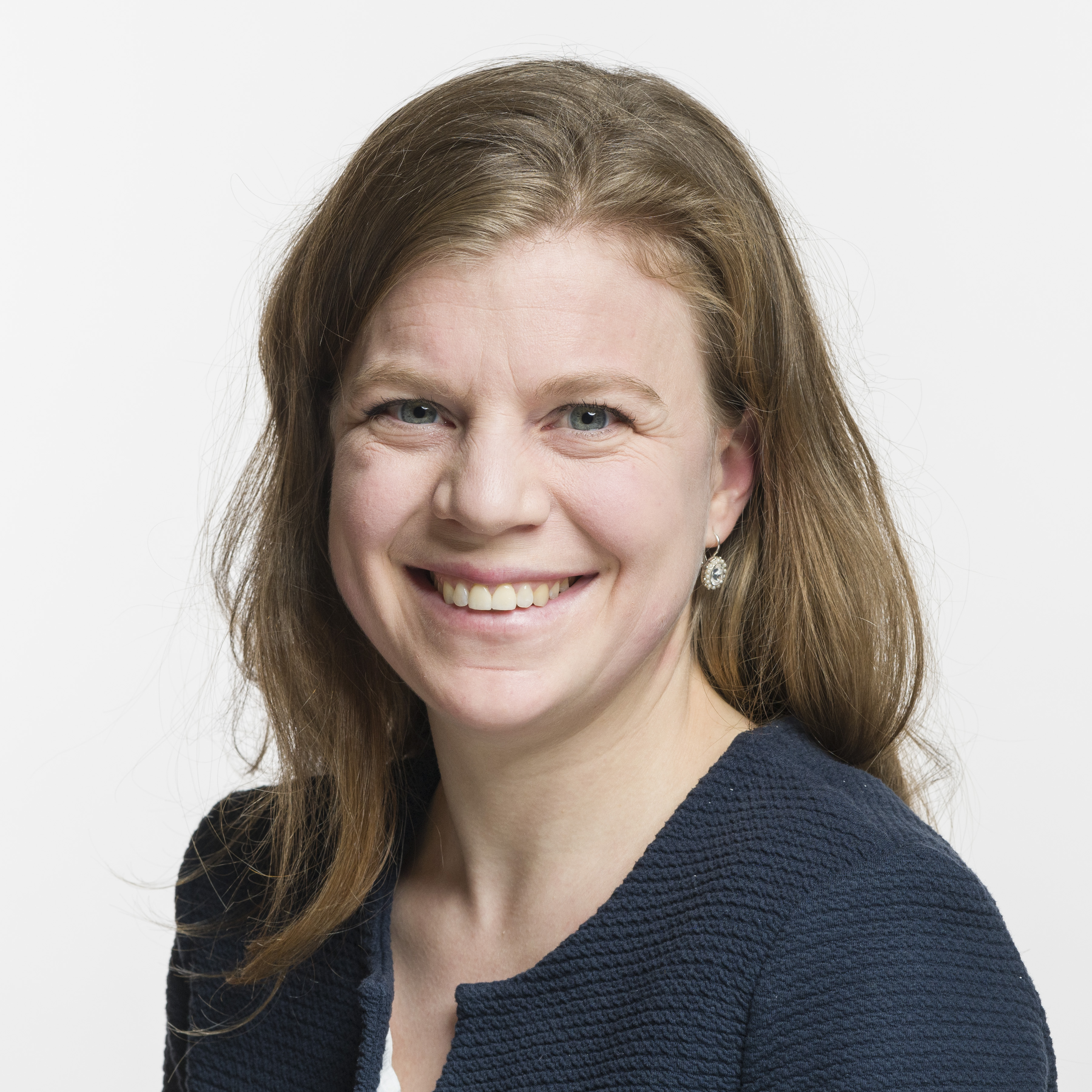
- Official portrait, 2019

Member of the National Council (Switzerland)
- Incumbent
- Assumed office 4 March 2013

Member of the Grand Council of Bern
- In office April 10, 2006 – 31 January 2013

Personal details
- Born: Nadine Désirée Masshardt; 4 October 1984 (age 41) Affoltern am Albis, Switzerland
- Party: Social Democratic Party
- Children: 3
- Occupation: Historian, politician
- Website: Official website

Nadine Désirée Masshardt (born 4 October 1984) is a Swiss politician who currently serves on the National Council (Switzerland) for the Social Democratic Party since 2013. Concurrently she also serves as vice-chair of the SP-Federal Palace Delegation. She previously served on the Grand Council of Bern from 2006 to 2013.
