= Conservative Democratic Party of Switzerland =

Swiss political party

Conservative Democratic Party of Switzerland Bürgerlich-Demokratische Partei Schweiz (BDP) (German) Parti bourgeois démocratique suisse (PBD) (French) Partito borghese democratico Svizzero (PBD) (Italian) Partida burgais democratica Svizra (PBD) (Romansh)
- President: Martin Landolt
- Founded: 1 November 2008
- Dissolved: 31 December 2020
- Split from: Swiss People's Party
- Merged into: The Centre
- Headquarters: Postfach 119; CH-3000 Bern 6
- Membership (2015): 6,500
- Ideology: Liberal conservatism
- Political position: Centre to centre-right
- Colours: Yellow (official); Black (customary)

The Conservative Democratic Party of Switzerland (German: Bürgerlich-Demokratische Partei Schweiz, BDP; French: Parti bourgeois démocratique suisse, PBD; Italian: Partito Borghese Democratico Svizzero, PBD; Romansh: Partida burgais democratica Svizra PBD, PBD; Swiss Democratic Bourgeois Party) was a liberal conservative political party in Switzerland from 2008 to 2020. After the 2019 federal election, the BDP had three members in the National Council.

It was founded as a moderate splinter group from the national-conservative Swiss People's Party (SVP/UDC); it was created as a political party on the federal level on 1 November 2008. It was led by Martin Landolt. It had, until January 2016, one Federal Councillor, Eveline Widmer-Schlumpf, whose election in defiance of the SVP/UDC incumbent Christoph Blocher led to the creation of the party. It comprised most of the SVP/UDC's old centrist-agrarian wing, which had been overshadowed in recent years by its nationalist-activist wing.

The party's name in German, French, Italian and Romansh came from "bourgeois", the traditional European term for a centre-right party.

On 1 January 2021, the party merged with the Christian Democratic People's Party (CVP/PDC) to form the new party The Centre (DM/LC). Cantonal parties were allowed to continue operating under the existing BDP/PBD name.

== Foundation ==
Soon after Eveline Widmer-Schlumpf's election to the Federal Council, the SVP/UDC excluded both her and the SVP/UDC's other Federal Councillor, Samuel Schmid, from the party group. Schmid, like Widmer-Schlumpf, was a member of the SVP/UDC's moderate wing; the party's dominant nationalist wing reckoned them both as unrepresentative of the SVP/UDC's populist campaigns. Some party members demanded that Widmer-Schlumpf and Schmid be thrown out of the party altogether. However, Swiss parties are legally federations of cantonal parties, so the SVP/UDC could not expel them directly. For them to have been expelled, the party's Grisons and Bern sections, to which Widmer-Schlumpf and Schmid belonged respectively, would have had to expel them.

On 2 April 2008, the national SVP/UDC leadership called for Widmer-Schlumpf to immediately resign from both the Federal Council and the party. When Widmer-Schlumpf declined to do so, the national SVP/UDC demanded that the Grisons branch expel her. The Grisons section stood by Widmer-Schlumpf, and was expelled from the national SVP/UDC on the following 1 June.

On 16 June 2008, the delegates' convention of the SVP/UDC's former Grisons branch voted to change its name to BPS Graubünden (Conservative Party of Switzerland-Graubünden), becoming the first cantonal section of what would become the BDP/PBD. A second cantonal section was founded in Bern on 21 June 2008 under the name BDP/PBD (Conservative Democratic Party); the change from BPS to BDP was due to a name conflict with the extant minor party Bürgerpartei Schweiz (Citizen's Party of Switzerland), which has the same acronym BPS. As a result, the Grisons branch also changed its name to BDP Graubünden. Soon afterward, nearly all of the SVP/UDC's Bern section, including Schmid, defected to the new party.

Eleven other cantonal branches were founded, predominantly in German-speaking Switzerland: Aargau, Basel-Landschaft, Fribourg, Glarus, Lucerne, Schwyz, Solothurn, St. Gallen, Thurgau, Valais and Zürich.

== Political positions ==
The BDP was described as being centre to centre-right, and supported bilateral accords with the European Union, and it opposed the tightening of Switzerland's asylum. It opposed additional benefits to health insurance, although it did not necessarily support limiting them. The BDP supported the raising of the retirement age, opposed any relaxation to requirements to receive social welfare, and supported same-sex marriage. The party favoured a gradual nuclear power phase-out.

== Electoral history ==
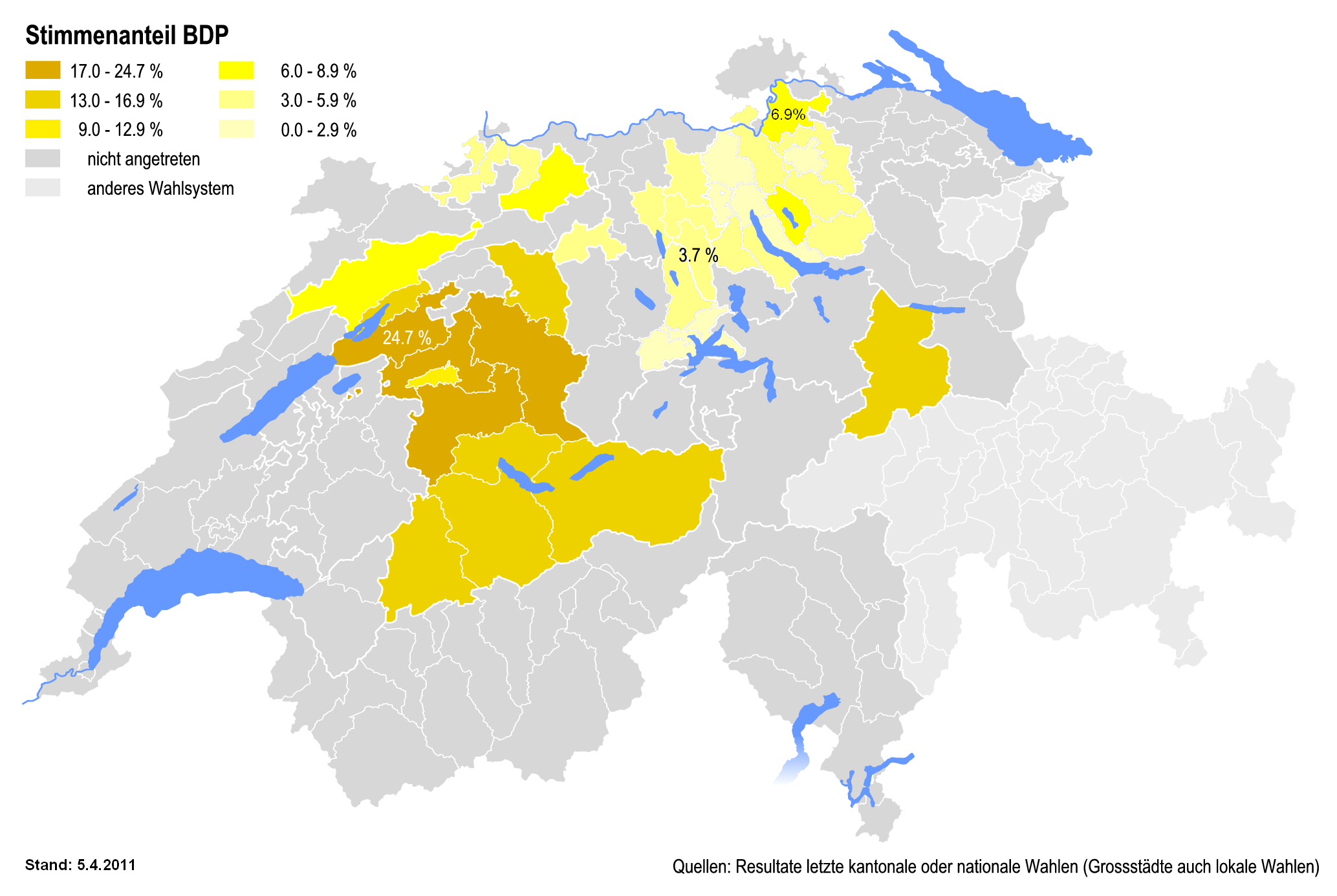
Percentages of BDP in district elections, 2011.

In 2019, the BDP had one seat in the Council of States, and 3 out of the 200 seats in the National Council.

Upon the BDP's founding, seventeen members of the Grand Council of Bern defected from the SVP. In the 2010 election, the number of BDP councillors increased to 25, making the BDP the third-largest party in Bern, behind the SVP and the Social Democratic Party.

Having been founded by the mass defection of the local SVP, the Conservative Democrats were the third-largest delegation in the Grand Council of Graubünden, with 30 seats, behind the Christian Democratic People's Party and FDP. The Liberals. The BDP also was the third-largest party in the Cantonal Council of neighbouring Glarus, with ten of the legislature's sixty seats.

After the BDP lost four seats in the 2019 election (and, therefore, its status as an own parliamentary group), the remaining three parliamentarians decided to join a parliamentary group together with the CVP and the EVP, two other moderate parties.

=== National Council and Council of States ===
Election year	# of overall votes	% of overall vote	# of National Council seats won	+/−	# of Council of States seats won	+/−	Notes
2011	132,279	5.4	9 / 200	New party	1 / 46	New party	
2015	103,476	4.1	7 / 200	▼2	1 / 46	Steady	
2019	59,206	2.4	3 / 200	▼4	0 / 46	▼1	

=== Party strength by canton ===
Percentage of the total vote for the Conservative Democratic Party in Federal Elections, 2011–2019
Canton	2011	2015	2019
Switzerland	5.4	4.1	2.4
Zurich	5.3	3.6	1.6
Berne	14.9	11.8	8.0
Lucerne	2.1	1.4	*^{a}
Schwyz	3.4	*	*
Glarus	61.7	51.5	63.0
Fribourg	1.9	1.3	0.7
Solothurn	4.4	3.4	2.0
Basel-Stadt	2.2	1.1	0.4
Basel-Landschaft	6.4	2.8	1.2
St. Gallen	3.8	3.6	0.6
Grisons	20.5	14.5	9.1
Aargau	6.1	5.1	3.1
Thurgau	5.0	3.8	2.3
Vaud	0.8	1.8	0.4
Valais	0.6	*	*
Neuchâtel	1.5	1.0	*
Geneva	*	1.0	0.4

1.^a * indicates that the party was not on the ballot in this canton.

== Party presidents ==
- Hans Grunder (2008–2012)
- Martin Landolt (2012–2020)
