= 2015 Swiss federal election =

- National Council
- 18 October 2015
- All 200 seats in the National Council; 101 seats needed for a majority
- Turnout: 47.62% (▼0.88pp)
Party	Leader	Vote %	Seats	+/–
Swiss People's	Toni Brunner	29.43	65	+11
Social Democrats	Christian Levrat	18.86	43	−3
FDP.The Liberals	Philipp Müller	16.39	33	+3
Christian Democrats	Christophe Darbellay	11.61	27	−1
Greens	Adèle Thorens; Regula Rytz	7.06	11	−4
Green Liberals	Martin Bäumle	4.63	7	−5
BDP	Martin Landolt	4.11	7	−2
Evangelical People's	Marianne Streiff	1.90	2	0
Ticino League	Attilio Bignasca	0.99	2	0
Labour	Gavriel Pinson	0.81	1	+1
CSP Obwalden	Sepp Stalder	0.40	1	0
Geneva Citizens'	Roger Golay	0.32	1	0
This lists parties that won seats. See the complete results below.
- Council of States
- 18 October–22 November 2015
- All 46 seats in the Council of States; 24 seats needed for a majority
Party	Seats	+/–
Christian Democrats	13	0
FDP.The Liberals	13	+2
Social Democrats	12	+1
Swiss People's	5	0
Greens	1	−1
BDP	1	0
Independents	1	0
This lists parties that won seats. See the complete results below.

Federal elections were held in Switzerland on 18 October 2015 for the National Council and the first round of elections to the Council of States, with runoff elections to the Council of States being held in various cantons until 22 November.

Results showed a shift, due to voter concerns regarding refugee immigration, to the right and increased support for the three largest parties, with the strong showing of Swiss People's Party and FDP.The Liberals possibly affecting future reforms of energy, social security and tax issues, as well as the make-up of the seven-member government.

The Swiss People's Party won a record number of seats, taking a third of the 200-seat lower house. The SVP received the highest proportion of votes of any Swiss political party since 1919, when proportional representation was first introduced, and it received more seats in the National Council than any other political party since 1963, when the number of seats was set at 200.

The federal election was followed by the 2015 Swiss Federal Council election on 9 December 2015, where the SVP won a second seat on the Federal Council.

== Electoral system ==
The 200 members of the National Council were elected by plurality in six single-member constituencies, and by proportional representation in 20 multi-member constituencies, with the 26 constituencies being the 26 cantons. The elections were held using the open list system where voters could cross out names on party lists, with voters also able to split their vote between parties (a system known as panachage) or draw up their own list on a blank ballot. Seats are allocated using the Hagenbach-Bischoff system.

The 46 members of the Council of States were elected in 20 two-seat constituencies (representing the 20 full cantons) and six single-member constituencies (representing the six half-cantons). In Jura and Neuchâtel the elections were held using proportional representation. In the other cantons, councilors are elected through an up to two-round system of voting. In the first round of voting, candidates must obtain an absolute majority of the vote in order to be elected. If no candidate receives an absolute majority in the first round of voting then a second round is held in which a simple plurality is sufficient to be elected. The top two finishing candidates are elected in the second round.

Compulsory voting was in force in the canton of Schaffhausen for both elections.

== Campaign ==
The parties contesting the elections were:

Political party	Leader	Political spectrum
Swiss People's Party (SVP)	Toni Brunner	Right-wing
Social Democratic Party of Switzerland (SP)	Christian Levrat	Centre-left to left-wing
FDP.The Liberals (FDP)	Philipp Müller	Centre-right
Christian Democratic People's Party of Switzerland (CVP/PDC)	Christophe Darbellay	Centre to centre-right
Green Party of Switzerland (GPS)	Adèle Thorens, Regula Rytz	Left-wing
Green Liberal Party of Switzerland (glp)	Martin Bäumle	Centre
Conservative Democratic Party of Switzerland (BDP)	Martin Landolt	Centre to centre-right
Evangelical People's Party of Switzerland (EVP)	Marianne Streiff	Centre
Ticino League (TL)	Attilio Bignasca	Right-wing
Alternative Left (AL)	Frédéric Charpié	Left-wing
Federal Democratic Union of Switzerland (EDU)	Hans Moser	Right-wing
Christian Social Party (Switzerland) (CSP)	Marius Achermann	Centre-left
Geneva Citizens' Movement (MCG)	Roger Golay	Right-wing

== Opinion polls ==
Date	Institution	SVP	SPS	FDP	CVP	GPS	BDP	GLP	EVP	AL	EDU	LEGA	CSP	MCG	Other	Lead
18 October 2015	2015 Elections	29.4%	18.8%	16.4%	11.6%	7.1%	4.1%	4.6%	1.9%	1.2%	1.2%	1.0%	0.2%	0.3%	–	10.6%
2 October 2015	Sotomo/20min	29.0%	18.4%	15.8%	11.4%	7.4%	4.9%	5.2%	–	–	–	–	–	–	7.9%	10.6%
16 September 2015	Sotomo/20min	29.0%	17.6%	16.8%	11.2%	6.9%	4.9%	5.1%	–	–	–	–	–	–	–	11.4%
21–28 August 15	GfS Berne/SSR	28.0%	19.3%	16.9%	11.1%	7.4%	4.2%	4.3%	1.7%	–	–	–	–	–	7.1%	8.7%
24 June 2015	20min/Somoto	27.6%	18.2%	16.4%	12.0%	6.8%	4.9%	5.0%	–	–	–	–	–	–	13.0%	9.4%
24 June 2015	GfS Berne/SSR	26.1%	19.3%	17.1%	11.5%	7.4%	4.4%	4.8%	1.9%	–	1.1%	0.9%	–	–	5.5%	6.8%
31 March 2015	GfS Berne/SSR	26.2%	19.6%	16.3%	11.8%	7.5%	4.6%	5.6%	1.9%	–	1.0%	0.8%	–	–	4.7%	6.5%
21 December 2014	Léger Marketing/Le Matin	23.8%	19.8%	15.7%	12.4%	8.2%	7.2%	7.4%	–	–	–	–	–	–	–	6.0%
3 October 2014	GfS Berne/Le Temps	24.6%	20.1%	15.8%	11.2%	7.3%	4.8%	7.3%	1.8%	–	1.4%	1%	–	–	4.7%	4.5%
30 March 2014	Léger Marketing/Le Matin	25%	19.4%	15.2%	12.2%	7.4%	6.9%	6.6%	–	–	–	–	–	–	–	5.6%
27 September 2013	GfS Berne/SSR	25.8%	18.7%	14.7%	11.7%	8.3%	7.5%	5.8%	1.8%	1.2%	1.0%	1.0%	–	–	2.5%	7.1%
15 September 2013	Isopublic/Le Matin	24.3%	19.6%	14.1%	13.1%	7.3%	6.1%	6.6%	–	–	–	–	–	–	–	4.7%
21 October 2012	Isopublic/Blick	23.7%	19.5%	15.9%	12.9%	8.2%	6.9%	7.0%	–	–	–	–	–	–	–	4.2%
16 September 2012	Isopublic/Le Matin	23.9%	19.3%	16.3%	13%	8.2%	6.2%	7.7%	–	–	–	–	–	–	–	4.6%
25 March 2012	Isopublic/Le Matin	23.7%	19.9%	15.8%	12.1%	8.2%	7.0%	7.5%	–	–	–	–	–	–	–	3.8%
23 October 2011	2011 Elections	26.6%	18.7%	15.1%	12.3%	8.4%	5.4%	5.4%	2%	0.9%	1.3%	0.8%	0.3%	0.4%	–	7.9%

== Results ==
Global media commented on the gains of the Swiss People's Party, linking it to concerns of the electorate on the European migrant crisis. Combined, right-of-centre parties received a slim 101-seat majority in the National Council. While the right-of-centre SVP and FDP made gains, centrist and left-of-centre parties lost seats in the National Council. The FDP increased its share of the popular vote for the first time since the 1979 federal election.

In the Swiss capital Bern, a group of activists in favour of settling refugees held a demonstration on the day of the election, which is prohibited by law. A total of 110 were arrested.

The election results elicited various responses from the Swiss media, such as that the election represented "a return to normality" after a period when the legislative makeup was not as clear, or that it represented "a divided country." Newspapers, both in Switzerland and in other countries, also noted the SVP's historic gains.

=== National Council ===
Party	Votes	%	Seats	+/–
Swiss People's Party	734,171	29.43	65	+11
Social Democratic Party	470,339	18.86	43	−3
FDP.The Liberals	408,793	16.39	33	+3
Christian Democratic People's Party	289,719	11.61	27	−1
Green Party	176,075	7.06	11	−4
Green Liberal Party	115,604	4.63	7	−5
Conservative Democratic Party	102,598	4.11	7	−2
Evangelical People's Party	47,355	1.90	2	0
Federal Democratic Union	29,701	1.19	0	0
Ticino League	24,713	0.99	2	0
Solidarity	20,199	0.81	0	0
Swiss Party of Labour	20,199	0.81	1	+1
Pirate Party	10,373	0.42	0	0
Christian Social Party of Obwalden	9,911	0.40	1	0
Alternative List	8,908	0.36	0	0
Geneva Citizens' Movement	8,069	0.32	1	0
Christian Social Party	5,207	0.21	0	0
Ecopop	3,649	0.15	0	0
Swiss Democrats	3,052	0.12	0	0
Enabling Democracy	2,776	0.11	0	0
Art + Politics	2,307	0.09	0	0
Integral Policy	1,883	0.08	0	0
Animal Party Switzerland	1,796	0.07	0	0
MontagnaViva	1,609	0.06	0	0
Alpine Parliament	1,324	0.05	0	0
Blank Vote List	1,266	0.05	0	0
Philipp Jutzi	1,199	0.05	0	0
Direct Democratic Party	942	0.04	0	0
Communist Party	907	0.04	0	0
Stop Traffic Jams and Speed Camera Terror - The List of Drivers	821	0.03	0	0
Swiss Nationalist Party	792	0.03	0	0
Non-Party	710	0.03	0	0
Popular Action Against too Many Foreigners and Asylum Seekers	698	0.03	0	0
Green Independents	656	0.03	0	0
Seeds of the Future	458	0.02	0	0
Independent Swiss	451	0.02	0	0
Sarah Bösch – The Original	379	0.02	0	0
Rauraque du Nord	376	0.02	0	0
New Liberal Party	347	0.01	0	0
Non-Selector.ch	300	0.01	0	0
The Swiss Independence Party up!	284	0.01	0	0
Vaud Independents	274	0.01	0	0
Fluffy Hans-Ueli (Hemp-Ueli)	267	0.01	0	0
Social Liberal Movement	245	0.01	0	0
Marcel Giger Amden Independent	242	0.01	0	0
El Presidente	231	0.01	0	0
Center Party	205	0.01	0	0
Patriotic Liberal Democrats	135	0.01	0	0
Anti-PowerPoint Party	125	0.01	0	0
DU – The Apolitical	123	0.00	0	0
Solution Oriented People's Movement	118	0.00	0	0
Lega Sud	104	0.00	0	0
I Liberisti	83	0.00	0	0
mach-politik.ch	65	0.00	0	0
Mouvement Democratique Cademos	63	0.00	0	0
Impossible Alternative	51	0.00	0	0
Swiss Freedom and Justice	48	0.00	0	0
Other parties	1,321	0.05	0	0
Total	2,494,417	100.00	200	0
Valid votes	2,494,417	98.93		
Invalid/blank votes	27,085	1.07		
Total votes	2,521,502	100.00		
Registered voters/turnout	5,295,506	47.62		
Source: Statistics Switzerland, Elections 2015, IFES

=== Council of States ===
Party	Seats	+/–
Christian Democratic People's Party	13	0
FDP.The Liberals	13	+2
Social Democratic Party	12	+1
Swiss People's Party	5	0
Green Party	1	−1
Conservative Democratic Party	1	0
Green Liberal Party	0	−2
Independents	1	0
Total	46	0
Source: Statistics Switzerland

==== By canton ====
Canton	Seat 1	Party	Seat 2	Party
Zurich	Daniel Jositsch	Social Democratic Party	Ruedi Noser	FDP.The Liberals
Berne	Werner Luginbühl*	Conservative Democratic Party	Hans Stöckli*	Social Democratic Party
Lucerne	Konrad Graber*	Christian Democratic People's Party	Damian Müller	FDP.The Liberals
Uri	Isidor Baumann*	Christian Democratic People's Party	Josef Dittli	FDP.The Liberals
Schwyz	Peter Föhn*	Swiss People's Party	Alex Kuprecht*	Swiss People's Party
Obwald	Hans Wicki	FDP.The Liberals	N/A	
Nidwald	Erich Ettlin	Christian Democratic People's Party	N/A	
Glaris	Thomas Hefti	FDP.The Liberals	Werner Hösli	Swiss People's Party
Zoug	Joachim Eder*	FDP.The Liberals	Peter Hegglin	Christian Democratic People's Party
Friburg	Christian Levrat*	Social Democratic Party	Beat Vonlanthen	Christian Democratic People's Party
Soleure	Pirmin Bischof*	Christian Democratic People's Party	Roberto Zanetti*	Social Democratic Party
Basle-City	Anita Fetz*	Social Democratic Party	N/A	
Basle-Country	Claude Janiak*	Social Democratic Party	N/A	
Schaffhouse	Hannes Germann*	Swiss People's Party	Thomas Minder*	Independent
Appenzell Outer-Rhodes	Andrea Caroni	FDP.The Liberals	N/A	
Appenzell Inner-Rhodes	Ivo Bischofberger*	Christian Democratic People's Party	N/A	
St Gall	Karin Keller-Sutter*	FDP.The Liberals	Paul Rechsteiner*	Social Democratic Party
Grisons	Stefan Engler*	Christian Democratic People's Party	Martin Schmid*	FDP.The Liberals
Argovia	Pascale Bruderer*	Social Democratic Party	Philipp Müller	FDP.The Liberals
Thurgovia	Roland Eberle*	Swiss People's Party	Brigitte Häberli-Koller*	Christian Democratic People's Party
Tessin	Fabio Abate*	FDP.The Liberals	Filippo Lombardi*	Christian Democratic People's Party
Vaud	Olivier Français	FDP.The Liberals	Géraldine Savary*	Social Democratic Party
Valais	Jean-René Fournier*	Christian Democratic People's Party	Beat Rieder	Christian Democratic People's Party
Neuchâtel	Didier Berberat*	Social Democratic Party	Raphaël Comte*	FDP.The Liberals
Geneva	Robert Cramer*	Green Party	Liliane Maury Pasquier*	Social Democratic Party
Jura	Claude Hêche*	Social Democratic Party	Anne Seydoux-Christe*	Christian Democratic People's Party
* indicates a candidate that was re-elected. Source: Statistics Switzerland

== Aftermath ==
The 2015 federal election was followed by the 2015 Swiss Federal Council election on 9 December 2015.

Owing to the results of the federal election, Federal Councillor Eveline Widmer-Schlumpf, a member of the Conservative Democratic Party (BDP), announced she would not run for re-election, as the Swiss People's Party (SVP) won a record percentage of the vote, while her own party decreased its share. The SVP was widely expected to fill her seat in the election, and it chose Thomas Aeschi (Zug), Guy Parmelin (Vaud) and Norman Gobbi (Ticino) as candidates for the seat, with Aeschi being the favorite at the time.

Guy Parmelin, of the SVP, was ultimately elected on 9 December. Parmelin, a farmer and winegrower from Bursins in canton Vaud, was the first member of the Federal Council who is also a member of the Swiss People's Party from the French-speaking part of Switzerland.

There was a minor cabinet reshuffle after the election, as newly elected Parmelin was selected to become head of the Federal Department of Defence, Civil Protection and Sports, replacing fellow SVP-member Ueli Maurer, who became head of the Federal Department of Finance. The SVP gained its second seat in the Federal Council, which it had lost in 2008, when the newly created BDP split from the SVP.
