= 2011 Swiss federal election =

Federal elections held in Switzerland

← 2007	23 October 2011	2015 →
- All 200 seats in the National Council (101 seats needed for a majority); All 46 seats in the Council of States (24 seats needed for a majority)
- Turnout: 48.5% ▲0.2 pp
Party	Leader	Vote %	Seats	+/–
National Council
Swiss People's	Toni Brunner	26.6%	54	−8
Social Democrats	Christian Levrat	18.7%	46	+3
FDP.The Liberals	Fulvio Pelli	15.1%	30	−5
Christian Democrats	Christophe Darbellay	12.3%	28	−3
Greens	Ueli Leuenberger	8.4%	15	−5
Green Liberals	Martin Bäumle	5.4%	12	+9
BDP	Hans Grunder	5.4%	9	New
Evangelical People's	Heiner Studer	2.0%	2	0
Ticino League	Giuliano Bignasca	0.8%	2	+1
Geneva Citizens'	Éric Stauffer	0.4%	1	+1
CSP Obwalden	Sepp Stalder	0.4%	1	+1
Council of States
Christian Democrats			13	−2
FDP.The Liberals			11	−1
Social Democrats			11	+2
Swiss People's			5	−2
Greens			2	0
Green Liberals			2	+1
BDP			1	New
Independent			1	+1
This lists parties that won seats. See the complete results below.
Map of Swiss cantons shaded by the party that won the most votes. The Swiss People's Party dominated German-speaking Switzerland, while the Social Democrats were the largest in the French-speaking west.

Federal elections were held in Switzerland on 23 October 2011. All of the Federal Assembly were to be elected: all 200 seats in the National Council and all 46 seats in the Council of States.

Voter turnout was 49.1%, compared to 48.9% in 2007.

== National Council ==
At the last election, in 2007, the Swiss People's Party (SVP) won the highest share of the vote ever recorded for a single party in Switzerland, with 29% of the vote. Soon after, a moderate faction split from the SVP, forming the Conservative Democratic Party (BDP).

In the 2011 election, the two neophyte parties BDP and Green Liberal Party (GLP) were successful, each receiving 5.4% of the popular vote. Both the GLP and the BDP have gained the required five seats to form their own parliamentary groups, suggesting a split of the centrist CVP/EVP/glp group.

All other major parties lost votes, the Swiss People's Party (SVP) for the first time since the 1987 elections. With 26.6% of the popular vote, the SVP is still the strongest party by a comfortable margin, but the 2011 elections marked the end of its rapid growth during the period of 1995–2007.

Of the small parties (below 5 seats), the Evangelical People's Party received 2.0% of the vote (+0.4%), retaining its two seats. The Ticino League received 0.8% of the vote (+0.2%) and gains one seat, now holding two.

The Christian Social Party lost one seat, but gained another to remain in the National Council, while the Federal Democratic Union of Switzerland and Swiss Party of Labour lost their single seats. Other minor groups which gathered more than 0.1% of the popular vote are: the Swiss Pirate Party (0.48%), the Swiss Democrats (0.20%), parteifrei.ch (0.19%) and Tierpartei Schweiz (0.15%).

Party	Votes	%	Seats	+/–
Swiss People's Party	648,675	26.61	54	−8
Social Democratic Party	457,317	18.76	46	+3
FDP.The Liberals	368,951	15.13	30	−1
Christian Democratic People's Party	300,544	12.33	28	−3
Green Party	205,984	8.45	15	−5
Green Liberal Party	131,436	5.39	12	+9
Conservative Democratic Party	132,279	5.43	9	+9
Evangelical People's Party	48,789	2.00	2	0
Ticino League	19,657	0.81	2	+1
Geneva Citizens' Movement	10,714	0.44	1	+1
Federal Democratic Union	31,056	1.27	0	−1
Swiss Party of Labour	21,482	0.88	0	−1
Christian Social Party	6,248	0.26	0	–1
Others	54,622	2.24	1	–
Total	2,437,754	100.00	200	0
Valid votes	2,437,754	98.08		
Invalid/blank votes	47,649	1.92		
Total votes	2,485,403	100.00		
Registered voters/turnout	5,124,034	48.50		
Source: Swiss Federal Statistical Office (in French) Statistics Switzerland (in German) Turnout

=== By constituency ===
Constituency	Seats	Electorate	Turnout	Party	Votes	Seats won
Aargau	15	399,092	193,601	Swiss People's Party	954,360	6
Aargau	15	399,092	193,601	Social Democratic Party	495,540	3
Aargau	15	399,092	193,601	FDP.The Liberals	315,427	2
Aargau	15	399,092	193,601	Christian Democratic People's Party	290,964	1
Aargau	15	399,092	193,601	Green Party	200,654	1
Aargau	15	399,092	193,601	Conservative Democratic Party	168,731	1
Aargau	15	399,092	193,601	Green Liberal Party	155,684	1
Aargau	15	399,092	193,601	Evangelical People's Party	88,483	0
Aargau	15	399,092	193,601	Federal Democratic Union	32,180	0
Aargau	15	399,092	193,601	Pirate Party	21,274	0
Aargau	15	399,092	193,601	Social Liberal Movement	13,087	0
Aargau	15	399,092	193,601	Swiss Democrats	10,419	0
Appenzell Ausserrhoden	1	37,678	17,900	FDP.The Liberals	8,970	1
Appenzell Ausserrhoden	1	37,678	17,900	Swiss People's Party	5,312	0
Appenzell Ausserrhoden	1	37,678	17,900	Christian Democratic People's Party	1,840	0
Appenzell Ausserrhoden	1	37,678	17,900	Green Party	1,114	0
Appenzell Ausserrhoden	1	37,678	17,900	Others	178	0
Appenzell Innerrhoden	1	11,358	4,232	Christian Democratic People's Party	3,107	1
Appenzell Innerrhoden	1	11,358	4,232	Social Democratic Party	830	0
Appenzell Innerrhoden	1	11,358	4,232	Others	146	0
Basel-Landschaft	7	186,806	89,949	Swiss People's Party	165,995	2
Basel-Landschaft	7	186,806	89,949	Social Democratic Party	150,583	2
Basel-Landschaft	7	186,806	89,949	Green Party	83,779	1
Basel-Landschaft	7	186,806	89,949	FDP.The Liberals	68,710	1
Basel-Landschaft	7	186,806	89,949	Christian Democratic People's Party	50,782	1
Basel-Landschaft	7	186,806	89,949	Conservative Democratic Party	39,129	0
Basel-Landschaft	7	186,806	89,949	Green Liberal Party	30,811	0
Basel-Landschaft	7	186,806	89,949	Evangelical People's Party	20,248	0
Basel-Landschaft	7	186,806	89,949	Swiss Democrats	4,162	0
Basel-Stadt	5	114,064	57,337	Social Democratic Party	80,673	2
Basel-Stadt	5	114,064	57,337	Swiss People's Party	45,771	1
Basel-Stadt	5	114,064	57,337	FDP.The Liberals	53,004	1
Basel-Stadt	5	114,064	57,337	Green Party	37,228	0
Basel-Stadt	5	114,064	57,337	Christian Democratic People's Party	18,082	1
Basel-Stadt	5	114,064	57,337	Green Liberal Party	16,139	0
Basel-Stadt	5	114,064	57,337	Evangelical People's Party	6,920	0
Basel-Stadt	5	114,064	57,337	Conservative Democratic Party	6,180	0
Basel-Stadt	5	114,064	57,337	Pirate Party	5,314	0
Basel-Stadt	5	114,064	57,337	People's Action	4,048	0
Basel-Stadt	5	114,064	57,337	Federal Democratic Union	1,418	0
Basel-Stadt	5	114,064	57,337	parteifrei.ch	1,337	0
Basel-Stadt	5	114,064	57,337	Free State of Lower Kleinbasel	901	0
Bern	26	713,938	359,576	Swiss People's Party	2,663,863	8
Bern	26	713,938	359,576	Social Democratic Party	1,776,105	6
Bern	26	713,938	359,576	Conservative Democratic Party	1,367,428	4
Bern	26	713,938	359,576	Green Party	865,168	3
Bern	26	713,938	359,576	FDP.The Liberals	795,408	2
Bern	26	713,938	359,576	Green Liberal Party	486,254	2
Bern	26	713,938	359,576	Evangelical People's Party	383,525	1
Bern	26	713,938	359,576	Federal Democratic Union	285,235	0
Bern	26	713,938	359,576	Christian Democratic People's Party	167,212	0
Bern	26	713,938	359,576	Pirate Party	67,509	0
Bern	26	713,938	359,576	Swiss Democrats	51,549	0
Bern	26	713,938	359,576	Alternative Left	42,439	0
Bern	26	713,938	359,576	Jimy Hofer plus	37,178	0
Bern	26	713,938	359,576	Alpenparlament	36,635	0
Bern	26	713,938	359,576	Party of Labour	31,487	0
Bern	26	713,938	359,576	Swiss Nationalist Party	27,717	0
Bern	26	713,938	359,576	Social Liberal Movement	25,420	0
Bern	26	713,938	359,576	Liberal Socialists	22,697	0
Bern	26	713,938	359,576	parteifrei.ch	21,378	0
Bern	26	713,938	359,576	Les Rauraques	17,911	0
Bern	26	713,938	359,576	Animal Party	17,505	0
Fribourg	7	185,485	87,582	Social Democratic Party	157,679	3
Fribourg	7	185,485	87,582	Swiss People's Party	126,759	1
Fribourg	7	185,485	87,582	Christian Democratic People's Party	119,710	2
Fribourg	7	185,485	87,582	FDP.The Liberals	75,636	1
Fribourg	7	185,485	87,582	Christian Social Party	32,325	0
Fribourg	7	185,485	87,582	Green Party	29,286	0
Fribourg	7	185,485	87,582	Green Liberal Party	20,979	0
Fribourg	7	185,485	87,582	Conservative Democratic Party	11,180	0
Fribourg	7	185,485	87,582	Federal Democratic Union	4,183	0
Fribourg	7	185,485	87,582	Evangelical People's Party	4,124	0
Fribourg	7	185,485	87,582	Pirate Party	3,630	0
Fribourg	7	185,485	87,582	parteifrei.ch	2,599	0
Fribourg	7	185,485	87,582	Integral Politics	1,525	0
Fribourg	7	185,485	87,582	Independent Citizens' Movement	1,360	0
Geneva	11	240,126	101,795	Social Democratic Party	208,505	3
Geneva	11	240,126	101,795	FDP.The Liberals	203,187	2
Geneva	11	240,126	101,795	Swiss People's Party	174,604	2
Geneva	11	240,126	101,795	Green Party	152,800	2
Geneva	11	240,126	101,795	Citizens' Movement	106,592	1
Geneva	11	240,126	101,795	Christian Democratic People's Party	106,486	1
Geneva	11	240,126	101,795	Solidarity	56,711	0
Geneva	11	240,126	101,795	Green Liberal Party	34,528	0
Geneva	11	240,126	101,795	Party of Labour	13,932	0
Geneva	11	240,126	101,795	Evangelical People's Party	11,085	0
Geneva	11	240,126	101,795	Pirate Party	9,806	0
Geneva	11	240,126	101,795	The Combative Left	4,918	0
Geneva	11	240,126	101,795	Alliance BLEUE	2,819	0
Glarus	1	26,078	8,915	Conservative Democratic Party	5,066	1
Glarus	1	26,078	8,915	Social Democratic Party	2,016	0
Glarus	1	26,078	8,915	Swiss People's Party	228	0
Glarus	1	26,078	8,915	Green Party	116	0
Glarus	1	26,078	8,915	Others	783	0
Grisons	5	135,141	60,965	Swiss People's Party	72,290	1
Grisons	5	135,141	60,965	Conservative Democratic Party	60,387	1
Grisons	5	135,141	60,965	Christian Democratic People's Party	49,117	1
Grisons	5	135,141	60,965	Social Democratic Party	46,075	1
Grisons	5	135,141	60,965	FDP.The Liberals	35,134	0
Grisons	5	135,141	60,965	Green Liberal Party	24,357	1
Grisons	5	135,141	60,965	Green Party	6,371	0
Grisons	5	135,141	60,965	Federal Democratic Union	1,499	0
Jura	2	50,629	22,472	Christian Democratic People's Party	14,602	1
Jura	2	50,629	22,472	Social Democratic Party	13,540	1
Jura	2	50,629	22,472	Swiss People's Party	6,792	0
Jura	2	50,629	22,472	Green Party	4,816	0
Jura	2	50,629	22,472	FDP.The Liberals	4,171	0
Lucerne	10	260,101	132,448	Christian Democratic People's Party	349,729	3
Lucerne	10	260,101	132,448	Swiss People's Party	323,783	2
Lucerne	10	260,101	132,448	FDP.The Liberals	237,031	2
Lucerne	10	260,101	132,448	Social Democratic Party	147,927	1
Lucerne	10	260,101	132,448	Green Party	106,756	1
Lucerne	10	260,101	132,448	Green Liberal Party	78,964	1
Lucerne	10	260,101	132,448	Conservative Democratic Party	27,586	0
Lucerne	10	260,101	132,448	Evangelical People's Party	9,619	0
Lucerne	10	260,101	132,448	Animal Party	6,541	0
Lucerne	10	260,101	132,448	parteifrei.ch	1,946	0
Neuchâtel	5	109,926	46,601	FDP.The Liberals	60,247	2
Neuchâtel	5	109,926	46,601	Social Democratic Party	55,451	1
Neuchâtel	5	109,926	46,601	Swiss People's Party	47,967	1
Neuchâtel	5	109,926	46,601	Green Party	26,137	1
Neuchâtel	5	109,926	46,601	Party of Labour	23,329	0
Neuchâtel	5	109,926	46,601	Christian Democratic People's Party	7,833	0
Neuchâtel	5	109,926	46,601	Conservative Democratic Party	3,331	0
Nidwalden	1	30,363	18,501	Swiss People's Party	8,060	1
Nidwalden	1	30,363	18,501	FDP.The Liberals	6,273	0
Nidwalden	1	30,363	18,501	Green Party	3,487	0
Obwalden	1	25,221	16,209	Christian Democratic People's Party	8,896	1
Obwalden	1	25,221	16,209	Swiss People's Party	6,739	0
Schaffhausen	2	49,783	30,263	Swiss People's Party	23,362	1
Schaffhausen	2	49,783	30,263	Social Democratic Party	20,256	1
Schaffhausen	2	49,783	30,263	FDP.The Liberals	7,206	0
Schaffhausen	2	49,783	30,263	Christian Democratic People's Party	3,064	0
Schaffhausen	2	49,783	30,263	Federal Democratic Union	2,218	0
Schaffhausen	2	49,783	30,263	Alternative Left	2,503	0
Schwyz	4	98,193	49,221	Swiss People's Party	72,008	1
Schwyz	4	98,193	49,221	FDP.The Liberals	39,557	1
Schwyz	4	98,193	49,221	Christian Democratic People's Party	38,964	1
Schwyz	4	98,193	49,221	Social Democratic Party	28,017	1
Schwyz	4	98,193	49,221	Green Party	3,797	0
Schwyz	4	98,193	49,221	Atom Free - Yes to Sun and Wood	3,466	0
Schwyz	4	98,193	49,221	Evangelical People's Party	2,097	0
Schwyz	4	98,193	49,221	Fresher Wind	1,665	0
Solothurn	7	173,356	89,651	Swiss People's Party	148,710	2
Solothurn	7	173,356	89,651	FDP.The Liberals	112,529	1
Solothurn	7	173,356	89,651	Social Democratic Party	111,894	2
Solothurn	7	173,356	89,651	Christian Democratic People's Party	109,152	2
Solothurn	7	173,356	89,651	Green Party	45,833	0
Solothurn	7	173,356	89,651	Green Liberal Party	30,415	0
Solothurn	7	173,356	89,651	Conservative Democratic Party	26,675	0
Solothurn	7	173,356	89,651	Evangelical People's Party	8,940	0
Solothurn	7	173,356	89,651	parteifrei.ch	8,182	0
Solothurn	7	173,356	89,651	Animal Party	6,009	0
Solothurn	7	173,356	89,651	Federal Democratic Union	2,968	0
St. Gallen	12	311,495	145,657	Swiss People's Party	536,150	4
St. Gallen	12	311,495	145,657	Christian Democratic People's Party	345,617	3
St. Gallen	12	311,495	145,657	Social Democratic Party	283,803	2
St. Gallen	12	311,495	145,657	FDP.The Liberals	208,587	1
St. Gallen	12	311,495	145,657	Green Party	108,708	1
St. Gallen	12	311,495	145,657	Green Liberal Party	101,598	1
St. Gallen	12	311,495	145,657	Conservative Democratic Party	64,450	0
St. Gallen	12	311,495	145,657	Evangelical People's Party	31,057	0
St. Gallen	12	311,495	145,657	Federal Democratic Union	20,810	0
Ticino	8	212,103	115,173	FDP.The Liberals	214,814	2
Ticino	8	212,103	115,173	Christian Democratic People's Party	172,574	2
Ticino	8	212,103	115,173	Ticino League	151,647	2
Ticino	8	212,103	115,173	Social Democratic Party	143,517	1
Ticino	8	212,103	115,173	Swiss People's Party	83,919	1
Ticino	8	212,103	115,173	Green Party	58,278	0
Ticino	8	212,103	115,173	Communist Party	10,560	0
Ticino	8	212,103	115,173	Green Liberal Party	9,098	0
Ticino	8	212,103	115,173	Strengthening the Family	2,437	0
Ticino	8	212,103	115,173	Svizzera Italiana	2,227	0
Thurgau	6	160,453	74,975	Swiss People's Party	168,239	3
Thurgau	6	160,453	74,975	Christian Democratic People's Party	62,525	1
Thurgau	6	160,453	74,975	Social Democratic Party	52,557	1
Thurgau	6	160,453	74,975	FDP.The Liberals	48,936	0
Thurgau	6	160,453	74,975	Green Party	30,609	1
Thurgau	6	160,453	74,975	Green Liberal Party	22,684	0
Thurgau	6	160,453	74,975	Conservative Democratic Party	21,570	0
Thurgau	6	160,453	74,975	Federal Democratic Union	15,148	0
Thurgau	6	160,453	74,975	Evangelical People's Party	12,747	0
Uri	1	26,110	12,979	FDP.The Liberals	9,005	1
Uri	1	26,110	12,979	Social Democratic Party	2,603	0
Uri	1	26,110	12,979	Others	517	0
Vaud	18	410,956	171,084	Social Democratic Party	742,728	6
Vaud	18	410,956	171,084	Swiss People's Party	677,170	4
Vaud	18	410,956	171,084	FDP.The Liberals	649,372	4
Vaud	18	410,956	171,084	Green Party	341,711	2
Vaud	18	410,956	171,084	Green Liberal Party	150,585	1
Vaud	18	410,956	171,084	Christian Democratic People's Party	136,616	1
Vaud	18	410,956	171,084	Party of Labour	115,915	0
Vaud	18	410,956	171,084	Solidarity	53,329	0
Vaud	18	410,956	171,084	Federal Democratic Union	32,392	0
Vaud	18	410,956	171,084	Evangelical People's Party	31,424	0
Vaud	18	410,956	171,084	Pirate Party	29,125	0
Vaud	18	410,956	171,084	Conservative Democratic Party	24,547	0
Vaud	18	410,956	171,084	Citizens' Movement	15,610	0
Vaud	18	410,956	171,084	Swiss Democrats	2,597	0
Vaud	18	410,956	171,084	Swiss Nationalist Party	2,389	0
Valais	7	205,917	127,351	Christian Democratic People's Party	262,263	3
Valais	7	205,917	127,351	Swiss People's Party	166,508	1
Valais	7	205,917	127,351	FDP.The Liberals	159,046	1
Valais	7	205,917	127,351	Social Democratic Party	129,797	2
Valais	7	205,917	127,351	Christian Social Party	75,322	0
Valais	7	205,917	127,351	Green Party	42,219	0
Valais	7	205,917	127,351	Alternative Left	5,497	0
Valais	7	205,917	127,351	Conservative Democratic Party	5,341	0
Zug	3	71,845	35,121	Swiss People's Party	33,116	1
Zug	3	71,845	35,121	Christian Democratic People's Party	28,413	1
Zug	3	71,845	35,121	FDP.The Liberals	22,494	1
Zug	3	71,845	35,121	Green Party	17,972	0
Zug	3	71,845	35,121	Green Liberal Party	7,943	0
Zug	3	71,845	35,121	Social Democratic Party	6,167	0
Zug	3	71,845	35,121	Christian Social Party	868	0
Zürich	34	877,817	410,976	Swiss People's Party	4,135,959	11
Zürich	34	877,817	410,976	Social Democratic Party	2,671,328	7
Zürich	34	877,817	410,976	FDP.The Liberals	1,613,851	4
Zürich	34	877,817	410,976	Green Liberal Party	1,591,924	4
Zürich	34	877,817	410,976	Green Party	1,163,522	3
Zürich	34	877,817	410,976	Conservative Democratic Party	731,501	2
Zürich	34	877,817	410,976	Christian Democratic People's Party	697,240	2
Zürich	34	877,817	410,976	Evangelical People's Party	425,520	1
Zürich	34	877,817	410,976	Federal Democratic Union	300,540	0
Zürich	34	877,817	410,976	Alternative Left	141,788	0
Zürich	34	877,817	410,976	Pirate Party	119,400	0
Zürich	34	877,817	410,976	parteifrei.ch	60,471	0
Zürich	34	877,817	410,976	Animal Party	55,466	0
Zürich	34	877,817	410,976	Swiss Democrats	39,012	0
Zürich	34	877,817	410,976	Party of Labour	33,100	0
Zürich	34	877,817	410,976	Fools Party	8,521	0
Zürich	34	877,817	410,976	Anti-PowerPoint Party	4,796	0
Zürich	34	877,817	410,976	Subitas	1,989	0
Source: Bundesblatt, 22 November 2011

== Council of States ==
The elections of the Council of States are done by a plurality voting system. 27 out of 46 seats were determined on the first ballot on 23 October; the remaining 19 seats were decided in a second ballot held in November.

Party	Seats	+/–
Christian Democratic People's Party	13	–2
FDP.The Liberals	11	-1
Social Democratic Party	11	+2
Swiss People's Party	5	–2
Green Party	2	0
Green Liberal Party	2	+1
Conservative Democratic Party	1	+1
Independents	1	+1
Total	46	0
Source: Politik-Stat

=== By canton ===
Canton	Seat 1	Party	Seat 2	Party
Zurich	Felix Gutzwiller *	FDP.The Liberals	Verena Diener *	Green Liberal Party
Berne	Werner Luginbühl *	Conservative Democratic Party	Hans Stöckli	Social Democratic Party
Lucerne	Konrad Graber *	Christian Democratic People's Party	Georges Theiler	FDP.The Liberals
Uri	Isidor Baumann	Christian Democratic People's Party	Markus Stadler *	Green Liberal Party
Schwyz	Alex Kuprecht *	Swiss People's Party	Peter Föhn	Swiss People's Party
Obwald	Hans Hess *	FDP.The Liberals	N/A	
Nidwald	Paul Niederberger *	Christian Democratic People's Party	N/A	
Glaris	This Jenny *	Swiss People's Party	Pankraz Freitag *	FDP.The Liberals
Zoug	Joachim Eder	FDP.The Liberals	Peter Bieri *	Christian Democratic People's Party
Friburg	Alain Berset *	Social Democratic Party	Urs Schwaller *	Christian Democratic People's Party
Soleure	Roberto Zanetti *	Social Democratic Party	Pirmin Bischof	Christian Democratic People's Party
Basle-City	Anita Fetz *	Social Democratic Party	N/A	
Basle-Country	Claude Janiak	Social Democratic Party	N/A	
Schaffhouse	Hannes Germann *	Swiss People's Party	Thomas Minder	Independent
Appenzell Inner-Rhodes	Ivo Bischofberger *	Christian Democratic People's Party	N/A	
Appenzell Outer-Rhodes	Hans Altherr *	FDP.The Liberals	N/A	
St Gall	Karin Keller-Sutter	FDP.The Liberals	Paul Rechsteiner	Social Democratic Party
Grisons	Martin Schmid	FDP.The Liberals	Stefan Engler	Christian Democratic People's Party
Argovia	Pascale Bruderer	Social Democratic Party	Christine Egerszegi *	FDP.The Liberals
Thurgovia	Roland Eberle	Swiss People's Party	Brigitte Häberli-Koller	Christian Democratic People's Party
Tessin	Filippo Lombardi *	Christian Democratic People's Party	Fabio Abate	FDP.The Liberals
Vaud	Géraldine Savary *	Social Democratic Party	Luc Recordon *	Green Party
Valais	Jean-René Fournier *	Christian Democratic People's Party	René Imoberdorf *	Christian Democratic People's Party
Neuchâtel	Didier Berberat *	Social Democratic Party	Raphaël Comte *	FDP.The Liberals
Geneva	Liliane Maury Pasquier *	Social Democratic Party	Robert Cramer *	Green Party
Jura	Claude Hêche *	Social Democratic Party	Anne Seydoux-Christe *	Christian Democratic People's Party
* indicates a candidate that was re-elected. Source: Federal Chancellery

== Pre-election polls ==
Pollster	Date	SVP	SPS	FDP	CVP	GPS	GLP	BDP	EVP	EDU	PdA	LdT	CSP	oth.
gfs.bern	1–8 October 2011	29.3	19.9	15.2	14.2	9.3	4.9	3.6	1.5	1.0	n.c.	n.c.	n.c.	1.1
Isopublic	1–23 September 2011	28.2	20.3	15.7	14.2	9.8	5.2	3.2	n.c.	n.c.	n.c.	n.c.	n.c.	3.4
gfs.bern	23 August – 3 September 2011	28.0	20.5	15.6	14.5	9.5	4.5	3.1	1.6	1.0	n.c.	n.c.	n.c.	1.7
demoscope.ch	25 July – 6 August 2011	24.8	19.5	17.8	12.4	9.9	7.2	3.0	n.c.	n.c.	n.c.	n.c.	n.c.	5.4
gfs.bern	25 July – 6 August 2011	27.4	18.5	16.1	15.0	10.1	4.6	2.9	1.7	1.7	n.c.	n.c.	n.c.	2.0
gfs.bern	13–26 June 2011	27.5	18.9	15.0	13.4	10.0	5.2	3.0	2.4	1.3	n.c.	n.c.	n.c.	3.3
Isopublic	8–18 June 2011	28.7	18.6	13.9	13.2	9.9	8.0	3.7	1.0	0.1	n.c.	n.c.	0.2	1.8
gfs.bern	4–16 April 2011	29.9	17.7	15.2	12.7	10.9	5.7	3.5	1.5	1.1	n.c	n.c	n.c	1.8
Isopublic	17–26 March 2011	25.4	18.2	15.4	14.3	10.5	6.1	2.8	n.c	n.c	n.c	n.c	n.c	7.3
gfs.bern	10–22 January 2011	29.8	18.0	17.7	12.9	8.8	5.2	2.6	2.2	1.5	n.c	n.c	n.c	1.4
Isopublic	10–21 December 2010	26.0	19.1	17.1	13.8	9.1	3.2	4.5	1.4	1.2	0.5	n.c	n.c	4.1
gfs.bern	28 Sept. – 11 Oct. 2010	26.1	20.1	17.2	14.1	8.5	3.8	3.6	2.4	0.6	0.7	0.2	0.7	2.0
2007 federal election	21 October 2007	28.9	19.5	17.7	14.5	9.6	1.4	—	2.4	1.3	0.7	0.6	0.4	2.9
