= List of members of the Federal Assembly from the Canton of Solothurn =

Coat of Arms

This is a list of members of both houses of the Federal Assembly from the Canton of Solothurn.

== Members of the Council of States ==
Councillor (Party)	Election	Councillor (Party)
Josef Burki; Free Democratic Party; 1848–1856	Appointed	Martin Josef Munzinger; Free Democratic Party; 1848–1855
Josef Burki; Free Democratic Party; 1848–1856	Appointed	Simon Lack; Liberal Party; 1849–1853
Josef Burki; Free Democratic Party; 1848–1856	Appointed	Friedrich Schenker; Swiss Democrats; 1853–1856
Jos. Wilhelm V. Vigier; Free Democratic Party; 1856–1886	Appointed	Amanz Kaspar Affolter; Free Democratic Party; 1856–1861
Jos. Wilhelm V. Vigier; Free Democratic Party; 1856–1886	Appointed	Amanz Jecker; Free Democratic Party; 1862–1874
Jos. Wilhelm V. Vigier; Free Democratic Party; 1856–1886	Appointed	Albert Brosi; Liberal Party; 1875–1881
Jos. Wilhelm V. Vigier; Free Democratic Party; 1856–1886	Appointed	Franz Joh. Trog; Free Democratic Party; 1881–1887
Oskar Munzinger; Free Democratic Party; 1886–1917	Appointed	Franz Joh. Trog; Free Democratic Party; 1881–1887
Oskar Munzinger; Free Democratic Party; 1886–1917	Appointed	Casimir von Arx; Free Democratic Party; 1887–1922
Robert Schöpfer; Free Democratic Party; 1917–1939	Appointed	Casimir von Arx; Free Democratic Party; 1887–1922
Robert Schöpfer; Free Democratic Party; 1917–1939	Appointed	Hugo Dietschi; Free Democratic Party; 1922–1937
Robert Schöpfer; Free Democratic Party; 1917–1939	Appointed	Iwan Bally; Free Democratic Party; 1938–1943
Paul Haefelin; Free Democratic Party; 1939–1959	1939	Iwan Bally; Free Democratic Party; 1938–1943
Paul Haefelin; Free Democratic Party; 1939–1959	1943	Gottfried Klaus; Social Democratic Party; 1943–1963
Paul Haefelin; Free Democratic Party; 1939–1959	1947	Gottfried Klaus; Social Democratic Party; 1943–1963
Paul Haefelin; Free Democratic Party; 1939–1959	1951	Gottfried Klaus; Social Democratic Party; 1943–1963
Paul Haefelin; Free Democratic Party; 1939–1959	1955	Gottfried Klaus; Social Democratic Party; 1943–1963
Karl Obrecht; Free Democratic Party; 1959–1967	1959	Gottfried Klaus; Social Democratic Party; 1943–1963
Karl Obrecht; Free Democratic Party; 1959–1967	1963	Werner Vogt; Social Democratic Party; 1963–1971
Ulrich Luder; Free Democratic Party; 1967–1979	1967	Werner Vogt; Social Democratic Party; 1963–1971
Ulrich Luder; Free Democratic Party; 1967–1979	1971	Walter Weber; Social Democratic Party; 1971–1987
Ulrich Luder; Free Democratic Party; 1967–1979	1975	Walter Weber; Social Democratic Party; 1971–1987
Max Affolter; Free Democratic Party; 1979–1991	1979	Walter Weber; Social Democratic Party; 1971–1987
Max Affolter; Free Democratic Party; 1979–1991	1983	Walter Weber; Social Democratic Party; 1971–1987
Max Affolter; Free Democratic Party; 1979–1991	1987	Rosemarie Simmen; Christian Democratic People's Party; 1987–1999
Rolf Büttiker; Free Democratic Party; 1991–2009; FDP.The Liberals; 2009–2011	1991	Rosemarie Simmen; Christian Democratic People's Party; 1987–1999
Rolf Büttiker; Free Democratic Party; 1991–2009; FDP.The Liberals; 2009–2011	1995	Rosemarie Simmen; Christian Democratic People's Party; 1987–1999
Rolf Büttiker; Free Democratic Party; 1991–2009; FDP.The Liberals; 2009–2011	1999	Ernst Leuenberger; Social Democratic Party; 1999–2009
Rolf Büttiker; Free Democratic Party; 1991–2009; FDP.The Liberals; 2009–2011	2003	Ernst Leuenberger; Social Democratic Party; 1999–2009
Rolf Büttiker; Free Democratic Party; 1991–2009; FDP.The Liberals; 2009–2011	2007	Ernst Leuenberger; Social Democratic Party; 1999–2009
Rolf Büttiker; Free Democratic Party; 1991–2009; FDP.The Liberals; 2009–2011	2009	Ernst Leuenberger; Social Democratic Party; 1999–2009
Rolf Büttiker; Free Democratic Party; 1991–2009; FDP.The Liberals; 2009–2011	2010	Roberto Zanetti; Social Democratic Party; 2010–2023
Pirmin Bischof; Christian Democratic People's Party; 2011–present	2011	Roberto Zanetti; Social Democratic Party; 2010–2023
Pirmin Bischof; Christian Democratic People's Party; 2011–present	2015	Roberto Zanetti; Social Democratic Party; 2010–2023
Pirmin Bischof; Christian Democratic People's Party; 2011–present	2019	Roberto Zanetti; Social Democratic Party; 2010–2023
Pirmin Bischof; Christian Democratic People's Party; 2011–present	2023	Franziska Roth; Social Democratic Party; 2023–present

== Members of the National Council ==
Election	Councillor (Party)	Councillor (Party)	Councillor (Party)	Councillor (Party)	Councillor (Party)	Councillor (Party)	Councillor (Party)
1848	Benjamin J. Brunner (Liberal)	Niklaus Pfluger (Liberal)	Johann Jakob Trog (Liberal)	3 seats 1848–1872			
1851	Benjamin J. Brunner (Liberal)	Niklaus Pfluger (Liberal)	Johann Jakob Trog (Liberal)	3 seats 1848–1872			
1854	Benjamin J. Brunner (Liberal)	Simon Lack (Liberal)	Johann Jakob Trog (Liberal)	3 seats 1848–1872			
1857	Franz Bünzli(y) (Conservative)	Simon Kaiser (FDP/PRD)	Bendicht von Arx (Grut*)	3 seats 1848–1872			
1860	Franz Bünzli(y) (Conservative)	Simon Kaiser (FDP/PRD)	Bendicht von Arx (Grut*)	3 seats 1848–1872			
1863	Franz Bünzli(y) (Conservative)	Simon Kaiser (FDP/PRD)	Bendicht von Arx (Grut*)	3 seats 1848–1872			
1866	Franz Bünzli(y) (Conservative)	Simon Kaiser (FDP/PRD)	Bendicht von Arx (Grut*)	3 seats 1848–1872			
1869	Franz Bünzli(y) (Conservative)	Simon Kaiser (FDP/PRD)	Bendicht von Arx (Grut*)	3 seats 1848–1872			
1872	Josef Bläsi (Liberal)	Simon Kaiser (FDP/PRD)	Bendicht von Arx (Grut*)	Albert Brosi (Liberal)	4 seats 1872–1902		
1875	Bonaventura Baumgartner (SD/DS)	Simon Kaiser (FDP/PRD)	Bendicht von Arx (Grut*)	Albert Brosi (Liberal)	4 seats 1872–1902		
1875	Carl Franz Bally (FDP/PRD)	Simon Kaiser (FDP/PRD)	Hermann Dietler (FDP/PRD)	Leo Jos. Weber (Liberal)	4 seats 1872–1902		
1878	Carl Franz Bally (FDP/PRD)	Simon Kaiser (FDP/PRD)	Hermann Dietler (FDP/PRD)	Leo Jos. Weber (Liberal)	4 seats 1872–1902		
1879	Oskar Munzinger (Liberal)	Simon Kaiser (FDP/PRD)	Franz Joh. Trog (FDP/PRD)	Leo Jos. Weber (Liberal)	4 seats 1872–1902		
1881	Oskar Munzinger (Liberal)	Simon Kaiser (FDP/PRD)	Franz Joh. Trog (FDP/PRD)	Albert Brosi (Liberal)	4 seats 1872–1902		
1882	Oskar Munzinger (Liberal)	Simon Kaiser (FDP/PRD)	Urs Schild (FDP/PRD)	Albert Brosi (Liberal)	4 seats 1872–1902		
1884	Oskar Munzinger (Liberal)	Simon Kaiser (FDP/PRD)	Urs Schild (FDP/PRD)	Albert Brosi (Liberal)	4 seats 1872–1902		
1885	Urs V. A. Heutschi (FDP/PRD)	Simon Kaiser (FDP/PRD)	Urs Schild (FDP/PRD)	Albert Brosi (Liberal)	4 seats 1872–1902		
1886	Wilhelm Vigier (FDP/PRD)	Simon Kaiser (FDP/PRD)	Urs Schild (FDP/PRD)	Albert Brosi (Liberal)	4 seats 1872–1902		
1887	Wilhelm Vigier (FDP/PRD)	Joseph Gisi (FDP/PRD)	Urs Schild (FDP/PRD)	Albert Brosi (Liberal)	4 seats 1872–1902		
1888	Wilhelm Vigier (FDP/PRD)	Joseph Gisi (FDP/PRD)	Fridolin Roth (Conservative)	Albert Brosi (Liberal)	4 seats 1872–1902		
1890	Wilhelm Vigier (FDP/PRD)	Joseph Gisi (FDP/PRD)	Joh. Bernhard Hammer (Liberal)	Albert Brosi (Liberal)	4 seats 1872–1902		
1893	Wilhelm Vigier (FDP/PRD)	Joseph Gisi (FDP/PRD)	Joh. Bernhard Hammer (Liberal)	Albert Brosi (Liberal)	4 seats 1872–1902		
1896	Wilhelm Vigier (FDP/PRD)	Joseph Gisi (FDP/PRD)	Josef Anton Glutz (Conservative)	Albert Brosi (Liberal)	4 seats 1872–1902		
1899	Wilhelm Vigier (FDP/PRD)	Joseph Gisi (FDP/PRD)	Franz Josef Hänggi (Conservative)	Albert Brosi (Liberal)	4 seats 1872–1902		
1902	Wilhelm Vigier (FDP/PRD)	Eduard Bally (FDP/PRD)	Franz Josef Hänggi (Conservative)	Albert Brosi (Liberal)	Jakob Zimmermann (FDP/PRD)	5 seats 1902–1911	
1905	Wilhelm Vigier (FDP/PRD)	Eduard Bally (FDP/PRD)	Franz Josef Hänggi (Conservative)	Albert Brosi (Liberal)	Jakob Zimmermann (FDP/PRD)	5 seats 1902–1911	
1908	Max Studer (FDP/PRD)	Eduard Bally (FDP/PRD)	Siegfried E. Hartmann (Conservative)	Adrian sen. von Arx (FDP/PRD)	Jakob Zimmermann (FDP/PRD)	5 seats 1902–1911	
1911	Max Studer (FDP/PRD)	Eduard Bally (FDP/PRD)	Siegfried E. Hartmann (Conservative)	Adrian sen. von Arx (FDP/PRD)	Jakob Zimmermann (FDP/PRD)	Hans Affolter (SP/PS)	6 seats 1911–1922
1914	Max Studer (FDP/PRD)	Eduard Bally (FDP/PRD)	Siegfried E. Hartmann (Conservative)	Adrian sen. von Arx (FDP/PRD)	Jakob Zimmermann (FDP/PRD)	Hans Affolter (SP/PS)	6 seats 1911–1922
1917	Josef August Kurer (Conservative)	Hermann Obrecht (FDP/PRD)	Siegfried E. Hartmann (Conservative)	Jacques Schmid (SP/PS)	Friedrich Stuber (FDP/PRD)	Hans Affolter (SP/PS)	6 seats 1911–1922
1919	Adrian jun. von Arx (FDP/PRD)	Hermann Obrecht (FDP/PRD)	Siegfried E. Hartmann (Conservative)	Jacques Schmid (SP/PS)	Friedrich Stuber (FDP/PRD)	Hans Affolter (SP/PS)	6 seats 1911–1922
1922	Adrian jun. von Arx (FDP/PRD)	Hermann Obrecht (FDP/PRD)	Jonas Burki (Conservative)	Jacques Schmid (SP/PS)	Friedrich Stuber (FDP/PRD)	Hans Affolter (SP/PS)	Josef August Kurer (Conservative)
1923	Adrian jun. von Arx (FDP/PRD)	Hermann Obrecht (FDP/PRD)	August Jäggi (Conservative)	Jacques Schmid (SP/PS)	Friedrich Stuber (FDP/PRD)	Hans Affolter (SP/PS)	Josef August Kurer (Conservative)
1925	Adrian jun. von Arx (FDP/PRD)	Hermann Obrecht (FDP/PRD)	August Jäggi (Conservative)	Jacques Schmid (SP/PS)	Oliv Jeker (FDP/PRD)	Hans Affolter (SP/PS)	Otto Walter (Conservative)
1928	Adrian jun. von Arx (FDP/PRD)	Friedrich Stuber (FDP/PRD)	August Jäggi (Conservative)	Jacques Schmid (SP/PS)	Oliv Jeker (FDP/PRD)	Hans Affolter (SP/PS)	Otto Walter (Conservative)
1931	Robert Schild (FDP/PRD)	Friedrich Stuber (FDP/PRD)	August Jäggi (Conservative)	Jacques Schmid (SP/PS)	Oliv Jeker (FDP/PRD)	Hans Affolter (SP/PS)	Otto Walter (Conservative)
1931	Ernst Flückiger (FDP/PRD)	Albert Helbling (FDP/PRD)	August Jäggi (Conservative)	Jacques Schmid (SP/PS)	Walter Stampfli (FDP/PRD)	Arnold Kamber (SP/PS)	Otto Walter (Conservative)
1935	Ernst Flückiger (FDP/PRD)	Albert Helbling (FDP/PRD)	August Jäggi (Conservative)	Jacques Schmid (SP/PS)	Walter Stampfli (FDP/PRD)	Adolf Furrer (SP/PS)	Otto Walter (Conservative)
1939	Ernst Flückiger (FDP/PRD)	Albert Helbling (FDP/PRD)	August Jäggi (Conservative)	Jacques Schmid (SP/PS)	Walter Stampfli (FDP/PRD)	Adolf Furrer (SP/PS)	Adolf Boner (Conservative)
1940	Ernst Flückiger (FDP/PRD)	Albert Helbling (FDP/PRD)	August Jäggi (Conservative)	Jacques Schmid (SP/PS)	Jean Meier (FDP/PRD)	Adolf Furrer (SP/PS)	Adolf Boner (Conservative)
1943	Urs Dietschi (FDP/PRD)	Albert Helbling (FDP/PRD)	Alban Müller (Conservative)	Jacques Schmid (SP/PS)	Jean Meier (FDP/PRD)	Adolf Furrer (SP/PS)	Adolf Boner (Conservative)
1947	Urs Dietschi (FDP/PRD)	Albert Helbling (FDP/PRD)	Alban Müller (Conservative)	Jacques Schmid (SP/PS)	Ernst Flückiger (FDP/PRD)	Adolf Furrer (SP/PS)	Adolf Boner (Conservative)
1947	Urs Dietschi (FDP/PRD)	Willy Arni (FDP/PRD)	Alban Müller (Conservative)	Jacques Schmid (SP/PS)	Karl Obrecht (FDP/PRD)	Adolf Furrer (SP/PS)	Adolf Boner (Conservative)
1951	Urs Dietschi (FDP/PRD)	Willy Arni (FDP/PRD)	Alban Müller (Conservative)	Jacques Schmid (SP/PS)	Karl Obrecht (FDP/PRD)	Adolf Furrer (SP/PS)	Adolf Boner (Conservative)
1955	Urs Dietschi (FDP/PRD)	Willy Arni (FDP/PRD)	Alban Müller (Conservative)	Willi Ritschard (SP/PS)	Karl Obrecht (FDP/PRD)	Adolf Furrer (SP/PS)	Adolf Boner (Conservative)
1959	Josef Grolimund (FDP/PRD)	Willy Arni (FDP/PRD)	Leo Schürmann (CCS)	Willi Ritschard (SP/PS)	Josef Hofstetter (FDP/PRD)	Adolf Furrer (SP/PS)	Pius Stebler (CCS)
1963	Josef Grolimund (FDP/PRD)	Willy Arni (FDP/PRD)	Leo Schürmann (CCS)	Hermann Berger (SP/PS)	Josef Hofstetter (FDP/PRD)	Otto Stich (SP/PS)	Pius Stebler (CCS)
1967	Josef Grolimund (FDP/PRD)	Daniel Müller (FDP/PRD)	Leo Schürmann (CCS)	Hermann Berger (SP/PS)	Josef Hofstetter (FDP/PRD)	Otto Stich (SP/PS)	Louis Rippstein (CCS)
1971	Josef Grolimund (FDP/PRD)	Daniel Müller (FDP/PRD)	Leo Schürmann (CCS)	Eduard Rothen (SP/PS)	Franz Eng (FDP/PRD)	Otto Stich (SP/PS)	Louis Rippstein (CCS)
1974	Josef Grolimund (FDP/PRD)	Daniel Müller (FDP/PRD)	Josef Ziegler (CVP/PDC)	Eduard Rothen (SP/PS)	Franz Eng (FDP/PRD)	Otto Stich (SP/PS)	Louis Rippstein (CCS)
1975	Cornelia Füeg (FDP/PRD)	Daniel Müller (FDP/PRD)	Josef Ziegler (CVP/PDC)	Eduard Rothen (SP/PS)	Franz Eng (FDP/PRD)	Otto Stich (SP/PS)	Louis Rippstein (CCS)
1979	Cornelia Füeg (FDP/PRD)	Daniel Müller (FDP/PRD)	Josef Ziegler (CVP/PDC)	Eduard Rothen (SP/PS)	Franz Eng (FDP/PRD)	Otto Stich (SP/PS)	Urs Nussbaumer (CVP/PDC)
1983	Christian Wanner (FDP/PRD)	Willy Pfund (FDP/PRD)	Josef Ziegler (CVP/PDC)	Rudolf Ruch (SP/PS)	Franz Eng (FDP/PRD)	Ernst Leuenberger (SP/PS)	Urs Nussbaumer (CVP/PDC)
1987	Christian Wanner (FDP/PRD)	Rolf Büttiker (FDP/PRD)	Peter Hänggi (CVP/PDC)	Ursula Ulrich-Vögtlin (SP/PS)	Urs Scheidegger (FDP/PRD)	Ernst Leuenberger (SP/PS)	Urs Nussbaumer (CVP/PDC)
1991	Christian Wanner (FDP/PRD)	Roland F. Borer (SVP/UDC)	Ruth Grossenbacher-Schmid (CVP/PDC)	Marguerite Misteli (GPS/PES)	Urs Scheidegger (FDP/PRD)	Ernst Leuenberger (SP/PS)	Paul Jäggi (CVP/PDC)
1993	Christian Wanner (FDP/PRD)	Roland F. Borer (SVP/UDC)	Ruth Grossenbacher-Schmid (CVP/PDC)	Marguerite Misteli (GPS/PES)	Rudolf Steiner (FDP/PRD)	Ernst Leuenberger (SP/PS)	Paul Jäggi (CVP/PDC)
1995	Peter Kofmel (FDP/PRD)	Roland F. Borer (SVP/UDC)	Ruth Grossenbacher-Schmid (CVP/PDC)	Boris Banga (SP/PS)	Rudolf Steiner (FDP/PRD)	Ernst Leuenberger (SP/PS)	Walter Straumann (CVP/PDC)
1997	Peter Kofmel (FDP/PRD)	Roland F. Borer (SVP/UDC)	Ruth Grossenbacher-Schmid (CVP/PDC)	Boris Banga (SP/PS)	Rudolf Steiner (FDP/PRD)	Ernst Leuenberger (SP/PS)	Alex Heim (CVP/PDC)
1999	Peter Kofmel (FDP/PRD)	Roland F. Borer (SVP/UDC)	Elvira Bader (CVP/PDC)	Boris Banga (SP/PS)	Rudolf Steiner (FDP/PRD)	Roberto Zanetti (SP/PS)	Alex Heim (CVP/PDC)
2003	Kurt Fluri (FDP/PRD / FDP.The Liberals)	Roland F. Borer (SVP/UDC)	Elvira Bader (CVP/PDC)	Boris Banga (SP/PS)	Rudolf Steiner (FDP/PRD)	Bea Heim (SP/PS)	Walter Wobmann (SVP/UDC)
2007	Kurt Fluri (FDP/PRD / FDP.The Liberals)	Roland F. Borer (SVP/UDC)	Elvira Bader (CVP/PDC)	Pirmin Bischof (CVP/PDC)	Brigit Wyss (GPS/PES)	Bea Heim (SP/PS)	Walter Wobmann (SVP/UDC)
2009	Kurt Fluri (FDP/PRD / FDP.The Liberals)	Roland F. Borer (SVP/UDC)	Elvira Bader (CVP/PDC)	Pirmin Bischof (CVP/PDC)	Brigit Wyss (GPS/PES)	Bea Heim (SP/PS)	Walter Wobmann (SVP/UDC)
2011	Kurt Fluri (FDP/PRD / FDP.The Liberals)	Roland F. Borer (SVP/UDC)	Urs Schläfli (CVP/PDC)	Stefan Müller-Altermatt (CVP/PDC/ The Centre)	Philipp Hadorn (SP/PS)	Bea Heim (SP/PS)	Walter Wobmann (SVP/UDC)
2015	Kurt Fluri (FDP/PRD / FDP.The Liberals)	Christian Imark (SVP/UDC)	6 seats 2015-present	Stefan Müller-Altermatt (CVP/PDC/ The Centre)	Philipp Hadorn (SP/PS)	Bea Heim (SP/PS)	Walter Wobmann (SVP/UDC)
2019	Kurt Fluri (FDP/PRD / FDP.The Liberals)	Christian Imark (SVP/UDC)	6 seats 2015-present	Stefan Müller-Altermatt (CVP/PDC/ The Centre)	Felix Wettstein (GP/PV)	Franziska Roth (SP/PS)	Walter Wobmann (SVP/UDC)
2023	Simon Michel (FDP.The Liberals)	Christian Imark (SVP/UDC)	6 seats 2015-present	Stefan Müller-Altermatt (CVP/PDC/ The Centre)	Felix Wettstein (GP/PV)	Franziska Roth (SP/PS)	Rémy Wyssmann (SVP/UDC)
