= List of political parties in Switzerland =

This is a list of political parties in Switzerland.

Switzerland has a multi-party system. Since 1959, the four largest parties have formed a coalition government, according to a Zauberformel or "magic formula". This arithmetic formula divides the seven cabinet seats among representatives of the four largest parties.

== Political parties in Switzerland ==
=== Federal and cantonal parliaments ===
The following parties are represented in the Swiss Federal Assembly or cantonal parliaments and executive councils as of 2024. For their names in the four national languages of Switzerland, see #Names in the national languages below.

For more detailed information on the political positions of some of the parties listed below, see here: For Swiss political party strength on the municipal level, see here:

Party		Leader	Main ideology	Position	Members in				
Party		Leader	Main ideology	Position	Federal Council	Council of States	National Council	Cantonal executives	Cantonal legislatures
SVP/UDC	Swiss People's Party	Marco Chiesa	National conservatism	Right-wing	2 / 7	6 / 46	62 / 200	27 / 154	574 / 2,544
SP/PS	Social Democratic Party	Cédric Wermuth; Mattea Meyer	Social democracy	Centre-left	2 / 7	9 / 46	41 / 200	28 / 154	442 / 2,544
FDP/PLR	FDP.The Liberals	Thierry Burkart	Classical liberalism	Centre to centre-right	2 / 7	11 / 46	28 / 200	38 / 154 (Note: Includes seats held by the FDP and by the Liberal Party in Vaud and Valais where cantonal parties did not merge and retained separate structures)	512 / 2,544
DM/LC/AdC	The Centre	Gerhard Pfister	Christian democracy	Centre to centre-right	1 / 7	15 / 46	29 / 200	40 / 154	425 / 2,544
GPS/PES	Green Party	Balthasar Glättli	Green politics	Centre-left to left-wing	0 / 7	3 / 46	23 / 200	7 / 154	249 / 2,544
GLP/PVL	Green Liberal Party	Jürg Grossen	Green liberalism	Centre	0 / 7	1 / 46	10 / 200	2 / 154	154 / 2,544
EVP/PEV	Evangelical People's Party	Lilian Studer	Christian democracy	Centre	0 / 7	0 / 46	2 / 200	1 / 154	42 / 2,544
Lega	Ticino League	Attilio Bignasca	Ticino regionalism	Right-wing	0 / 7	0 / 46	1 / 200	2 / 154	14 / 2,544
CSP OW	Christian Social Party of Obwalden	Christian Schäli; Sepp Stalder	Christian left	Centre-left	0 / 7	0 / 46	0 / 154	1 / 154	6 / 2,544
PdA/PST/POP	Swiss Party of Labour	Norberto Crivelli	Communism	Left-wing to far-left	0 / 7	0 / 46	0 / 200	0 / 154	13 / 2,544
MCG	Geneva Citizens' Movement	Ana Roch	Geneva regionalism	Right-wing	0 / 7	1 / 46	2 / 200	0 / 154	14 / 2,544
Sol	Solidarity	–	Anti-capitalism	Left-wing to far-left	0 / 7	0 / 46	0 / 200	1 / 154	0 / 2,544
EDU/UDF	Federal Democratic Union	Hans Moser	Right-wing populism	Right-wing	0 / 7	0 / 46	2 / 200	0 / 154	21 / 2,544
CSP/PCS	Christian Social Party	Marius Achermann	Christian left	Centre-left	0 / 7	0 / 46	0 / 200	1 / 154	14 / 2,544
AL-ZH	Alternative List	–	Socialism	Left-wing	0 / 7	0 / 46	0 / 200	0 / 154	0 / 2,544
AL-BE	Alternative Left Bern	–	Democratic socialism	Left-wing	0 / 7	0 / 46	0 / 200	0 / 154	10 / 2,544
Total					7	46	200	154 (Note: Includes independents and small minor parties.)	2,544 (Note: Includes independents and small minor parties.)

=== Minor parties ===
The following groups or parties are not represented at either the cantonal or national level (but may hold positions in municipal parliaments).

Abbr.	Name	W	Leader	Ideology	Founded	Popular vote (Note: 2011 Swiss federal election, where applicable)
RKP/PCR	Revolutionary Communist Party		Collective Leadership	Communism, Marxism, Trotskyism	2023	
SD/DS	Swiss Democrats		Dr. Michel Dupont, Christoph Spiess	Right-wing, national conservatism	1961	0.13% (2019)
SLB/MSL	Social Liberal Movement		Samuel Schmid	Centre-right, social conservatism	2011	0.1% (2015)
LP/PL	Libertarian Party		Martin Hartmann	Libertarianism	2014	0.01% (2019)
FPS/PSL	Freedom Party		Daniele Weber	Right-wing, national liberalism	1984	n/a
HPS/PHS	Swiss Humanist Party		Daniel Horowitz	Humanist Movement	1984	n/a
KVP	Catholic People's Party		Lukas Brühwiler-Frésey	Catholic social teaching	1994	n/a
TPS/PSpA	Tierpartei Schweiz		Thomas Märki	Animal rights	2010	0.15% (2015)
	Parteifrei		Lukas Harder	Voluntary association of independent politicians formed for the 2011 elections; opposing party politics	2011	0.19% (2015)
	MontagnaViva		Germano Mattei	Regionalism (Alpine Ticino)	2011	0.08% (2015)
	Alpenparlament			Alternative medicine	2011	0.06% (2015)
	Konfessionslose			Separation of church and state	2011	0.05% (2015)
	Volksaktion		Eric Weber	Right-wing populism (Basel-Stadt)	2002	0.03% (2015)
	Les Rauraques			Jura separatism (Bernese Jura)	2011	0.03% (2015)
	Mass-Voll		Nicolas Rimoldi	Right-Wing, Opponents of COVID-19 measures	2021	0.53% (2023)

=== Historical parties ===
Name	Ideology	Active	Continued as
Christian Democratic People's Party	Christian democracy, Social conservatism, Support for EU Bilateral Accords	1912–2020	merged to The Centre
Communist Party of Switzerland	Communism	1921–1940	Swiss Party of Labour
Communist Party of Switzerland/Marxist–Leninists	Communism	1969–1987	Libertarian Socialist Party
Communist Party Opposition	Communism	1930–1935	Social Democratic Party of Switzerland
Conservative Democratic Party	Conservative liberalism	2008–2020	merged to The Centre
Democratic Party	Direct democracy	1860–1971	merged to Swiss People's Party
Party of Farmers, Traders and Independents (BGB)	Conservatism, Agrarianism	1936–1971	merged to Swiss People's Party
Eidgenössische Sammlung	Fascism	1940–1943	
Free Democratic Party of Switzerland (FDP/PRD/PLR)	Classical liberalism, Radicalism	1894–2009	merged to The Liberals
Liberal Party of Switzerland (LPS/PLS)	Classical liberalism	1913–2009	merged to The Liberals
National Front	Fascism	1930s	Eidgenössische Sammlung
National Movement of Switzerland (NBS)	Nazism	1940–1941	
National Union	Fascism	1932–1940	
Progressive Organizations of Switzerland (POCH)	Communism	1969–1993	
Republican Movement	Right-wing populism, Christian right	1971–1989	
Ring of Independents (LdU)	Centrism	1936–1999	
La gauche combative	Communism (Geneva)	2002	0.03% (2015)
Swiss Nationalist Party	Völkisch nationalism	2000–2022	
Volkspartei der Schweiz (VPS)	Neo-Nazism	1950s	

== Names in the national languages ==
Abbr.	Party	German	French	Italian	Romansh
SVP/UDC	Swiss People's Party	Schweizerische Volkspartei (SVP)	Union démocratique du Centre (UDC)	Unione Democratica di Centro (UDC)	Partida populara Svizra (PPS)
SP/PS	Social Democratic Party	Sozialdemokratische Partei der Schweiz (SP)	Parti socialiste suisse (PS)	Partito Socialista Svizzero (PS)	Partida socialdemocratica da la Svizra (PS)
FDP/PRD	Free Democratic Party	Freisinnig-Demokratische Partei der Schweiz (FDP)	Parti radical-démocratique suisse (PRD)	Partito Liberale Radicale (PLR)	Partida liberaldemocrata da la Svizra (PLD)
Mitte/Centre	The Centre	Die Mitte (DM)	Le Centre (LC)	Alleanza del Centro (AdC)	Allianza dal Center (AdC)
GPS/PES	Green Party	Grüne Partei der Schweiz (Die Grünen)	Parti écologiste suisse (Les Verts)	Partito Ecologista Svizzero (I Verdi)	Partida ecologica svizra (Ils Verds)
CSP/PCS	Christian Social Party	Christlich-soziale Partei (CSP)	Parti chrétien-social (PCS)	Partito Cristiano Sociale (PCS)	Partida cristiansociala da la Svizra (PCS)
CVP/PDC	Christian Democratic People's Party	Christlichdemokratische Volkspartei der Schweiz (CVP)	Parti démocrate-chrétien suisse (PDC)	Partito Popolare Democratico (PPD)	Partida Cristian-democratica da la Svizra (PCD)
BDP/PBD	Conservative Democratic Party	Bürgerlich-Demokratische Partei Schweiz (BDP)	Parti bourgeois démocratique Suisse (PBD)	Partito borghese democratico Svizzera (PBD)	Partida burgais democratica Svizra (PBD)
EVP/PEV	Evangelical People's Party	Evangelische Volkspartei der Schweiz (EVP)	Parti évangelique suisse (PEV)	Partito Evangelico Svizzero (PE)	Partida evangelica svizra (PEV)
FPS/PSL	Freedom Party	Freiheits-Partei der Schweiz (FPS)	Parti suisse de la liberté (PSL)	Partito svizzero della Libertà (PSL)	Partida svizra da la libertad (PSL)
LPS/PLS	Liberal Party	Liberale Partei der Schweiz (LPS)	Parti libéral suisse (PLS)	Partito Liberale Svizzero (PLS)	Partida liberal-conservativa Svizra (PLC)
AL	Alternative Left	Alternative Linke (AL)	La Gauche (LG)	La Sinistra (LS)	Alternativa sanestra (AS)
SD/DS	Swiss Democrats	Schweizer Demokraten (SD)	Démocrates suisses (DS)	Democratici Svizzeri (DS)	Democrats svizers (DS)
Lega	Ticino League	Liga der Tessiner	Ligue des Tessinois	Lega dei Ticinesi	Liga dals Tessinais
EDU/UDF	Federal Democratic Union	Eidgenössisch-Demokratische Union (EDU)	Union démocratique fédérale (UDF)	Unione Democratica Federale (UDF)	Uniun democrata federala (UDF)
PdA/PST	Swiss Party of Labour	Partei der Arbeit der Schweiz (PdA)	Parti suisse du travail – Parti ouvrier et populaire (PST-POP)	Partito Svizzero del Lavoro – Partito Operaio e Popolare (PC)	Partida svizra da la lavur (PdL)
GLP/PVL	Green Liberal Party	Grünliberale Partei der Schweiz (GLP)	Parti vert'libéral (PVL)	Partito Verde Liberale (PVL)	Partida verda-liberala (PVL)
MCG	Geneva Citizens' Movement	Genfer Bürgerbewegung	Mouvement citoyens genevois (MCG)	Movimento dei Cittadini Ginevrini	
CSP OW	Christian Social Party of Obwalden	Christlichsoziale Partei Obwalden (CSP OW)	Parti chrétien-social d'Obwald		
Sol	Solidarity	Solidarität	solidaritéS	Solidarità	Solidaritad
SLB/MSL	Social Liberal Movement	Sozial-Liberale Bewegung	Mouvement socio-libéral	Movimento social-liberale	
SD/DS	Swiss Democrats	Schweizer Demokraten (SD)	Démocrates suisses (DS)	Democratici Svizzeri (DS)	Democrats svizers (DS)
FPS/PSL	Freedom Party	Freiheits-Partei der Schweiz	Parti suisse de la liberté	Partito svizzero della Libertà	Partida Svizra da la Libertad
HPS/PHS	Swiss Humanist Party	Humanistische Partei der Schweiz	Parti Humaniste de la Suisse	Partito Umanista della Svizzera	Partida umanistica da la Svizra
KVP	Catholic People's Party	Katholische Volkspartei	Parti populaire catholique	Partito Popolare Cattolico	Partida populara catolica
PPS	Pirate Party	Piratenpartei Schweiz	Parti Pirate Suisse	Partito Pirata Svizzera	Partida da Pirats Svizra
TPS/PSpA	Tierpartei Schweiz	Tierpartei Schweiz (TPS)	Parti suisse pour les animaux (PSpA)	Partito svizzero per gli animali (PSpA)	Partida svizra d'animals (PSA)
up!	The Swiss Independence Party up!	Unabhängigkeitspartei up!	Parti suisse de l'indépendance	up! Switzerland	

Sources: The Swiss Federal Chancellery

== Relative importance ==
=== At the federal level ===
Composition of the National Council by political party, 1919–2023

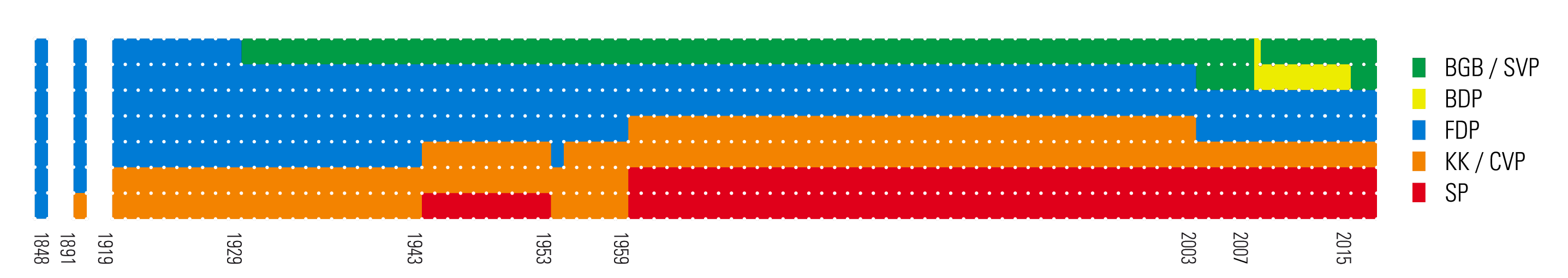
Composition of the Federal Council by political party, 1919–2017

=== Overall ===
Number of elected representatives by party at the federal, cantonal and communal levels in 2014 (governmental parties)
Party	Number of elected representatives at the federal, cantonal and communal levels
FDP.The Liberals	2,011
Social Democratic Party	1,863
Swiss People's Party	1,511
Christian Democratic Party	1,205
Conservative Democratic Party	173

== See also ==
- Politics of Switzerland
- List of political parties by country

== Bibliography ==
- Pierre Cormon, Swiss Politics for Complete Beginners, Editions Slatkine, 2014. ISBN 978-2-8321-0607-5
