= Roberto Zanetti =

Roberto Zanetti may refer to:

- Savage (musician) (Roberto Zanetti), Italian singer and music producer
- Roberto Zanetti (politician), Swiss politician
