= Ruth Grossenbacher =

Swiss politician

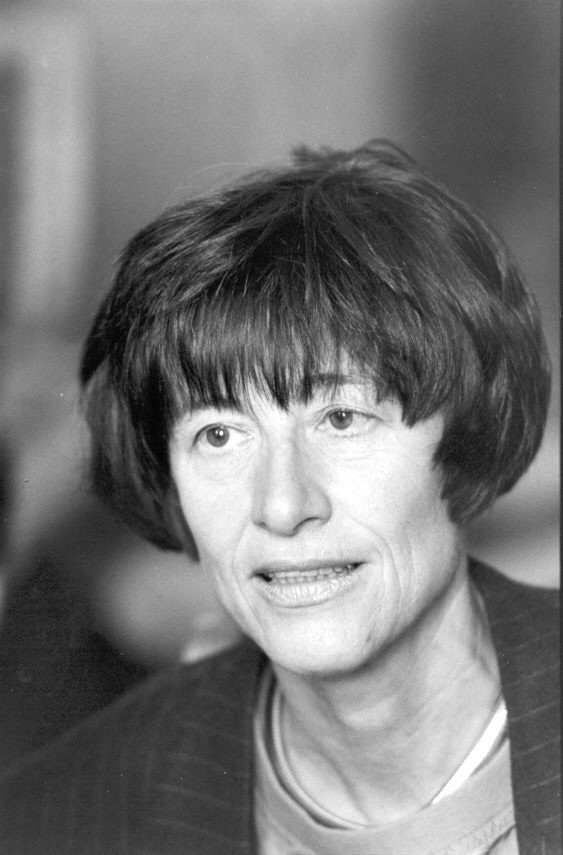
Ruth Grossenbacher-Schmid in 1992.

Ruth Grossenbacher-Schmid (born 13 September 1936 in Cape Town, South Africa; originally from Obererlinsbach, canton of Solothurn) is a Swiss politician of the Christian Democratic People's Party (CVP). She was a member of the National Council for the canton of Solothurn from 1991 to 1999.

== Life ==
Ruth Schmid was born in 1936 as the youngest of three daughters of a Swiss family in Cape Town, South Africa. Her father emigrated to South Africa in 1921, where he took part to the construction of a shoe factory for the Swiss luxury house Bally. The family came back to Switzerland in 1946 and Schmid's father worked at the headquarters of Bally in Schönenwerd in the canton of Solothurn. After her schooling and her marriage, Ruth Grossenbacher worked for twenty years as an English teacher in a vocational school.

Ruth Grossenbacher-Schmid is married and mother of two daughters. Her eldest daughter was born with a severe heart defect and died during an operation at the age of 6.

== Political career ==
In 1973, two years after the introduction of women's suffrage in the canton of Solothurn, Grossenbacher was elected to the communal council of Niedererlinsbach. Later she was a member of the Constitutional Council of Solothurn. From 1986 to 1991, she was the second chairwoman of the Christian Democratic People's Party's Swiss women section. Upon her proposal, the CVP became the first people's party to introduce a 1/3 minimum women's quota in its boards by the end of 1991. In the same year, Grossenbacher became a deputy in the National Council, where she made one's mark in the realms of education, social and culture policy. In 1994, she served as a United Nations election observer in South Africa. Moreover, she was the chairwoman of the organisation Pro Familia Schweiz which promotes family friendliness in workplaces. Grossenbacher's concern for the issues of women, minorities and underprivileged people was an essential part of her long social and political commitment.

After she left she National Council in 1999, Grossenbacher took on numerous other functions, including the chairwomanship of the Solothurn Film Festival Society and of the Federal Department of Foreign Affairs.

In 2019, Ruth Grossenbacher was awarded the Recognition Prize of the canton of Solothurn.

== See also ==
- List of members of the Federal Assembly from the Canton of Solothurn
