= Swiss Nationalist Party =

- Founded: 10 September 2000
- Dissolved: February 2022
- Ideology: Völkisch movement Neo-Nazism; Neue Rechte; Swiss nationalism
- Political position: Far-right

Website
- www.pnos.ch www.partinationalistesuisse.ch

The Swiss Nationalist Party (German: Partei National Orientierter Schweizer, lit. 'Party of Nationally Oriented Swiss', abbreviated to PNOS; French: Parti nationaliste suisse, abbreviated to PNS; Italian: Partito nazionalista svizzero) was a Neo-Nazi völkisch political party in Switzerland founded in 2000. It was classified as "extremist" by the Swiss federal police in 2001.

The party's course was initially imitating that of the 1930s National Front with a clearly National Socialist ideology (dubbed "eidgenössisch-sozialistisch" by the PNOS) but has since been "modernized" in accordance with the vocabulary of Germany's Neue Rechte.

The party was not represented in any cantonal parliament. Its activities were mostly confined to the Swiss German-speaking parts of the western Swiss Plateau. It had one representative in the municipal parliament of Langenthal, canton of Bern (population 14,300), elected in 2004. In 2005, another member was elected to the municipal executive council of Günsberg, canton of Solothurn (population 1,100).

They participated in the federal elections of 2011 in the canton of Bern, gathering 0.3% of the popular vote (1,066 votes), less than a tenth of the votes required to win a seat in parliament. They also participated in Vaud, gathering a total of 132 votes (less than the 0.2% of the votes required to win a seat).

In February 2017, the party invited Russian neo-nazi Denis Nikitin, to lead a martial arts education in Bettwiesen (Thurgau). PNO boss Lüthard said that he "knew nothing about the role of Nikitin as the alleged leader of the Russian thugs in Marseille".

In February 2022, the party dissolved.

== Federal elections ==
Federal Assembly of Switzerland
Election	# of total votes	% of popular vote	# of seats won
2015	792	0.03%	0
2019	582	0.02% ▼	0
