= Eric Weber =

Swiss journalist and politician (born 1963)

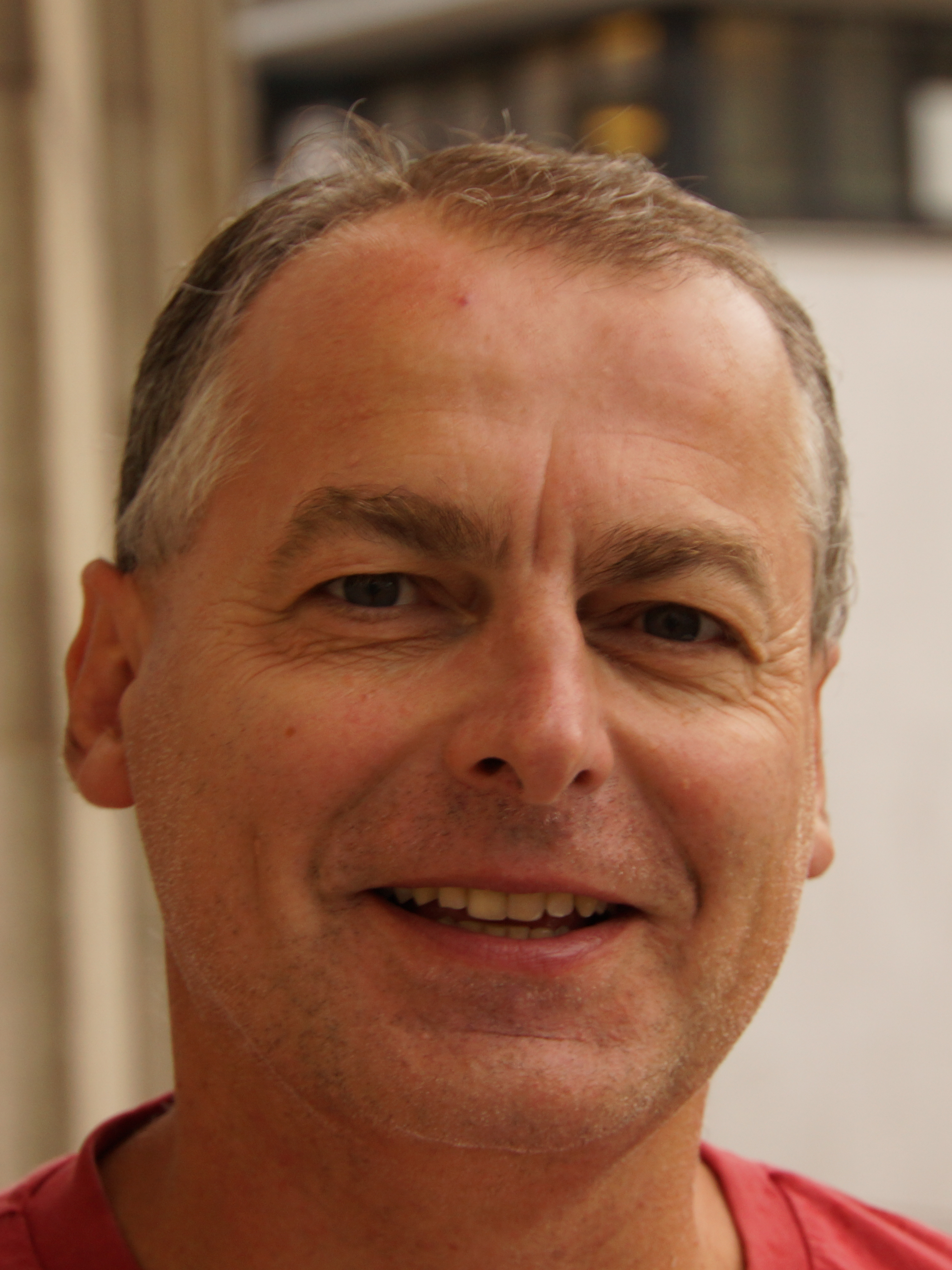
- Eric Weber (2012)

Member of the Grand Council of Basel-Stadt
- Incumbent
- Assumed office 1 February 2021

Personal details
- Born: Eric Michael Weber; 24 June 1963 (age 62) Basel, Basel-Stadt, Switzerland
- Party: VA movement
- Children: 2
- Profession: Publisher, journalist and politician
- Website: ericweber.net (in German)

Eric Michael Weber (born 24 June 1963) is a Swiss populist publisher, journalist, and far-right politician. He currently serves his third term as a member of the Grand Council of Basel-Stadt for his independent VA, which is his own political movement without any other members.

== Early life and education ==
Weber was born in Basel, Switzerland on 24 June 1963 to Rudolf Weber and a German-born mother, who hailed originally from Chemnitz in Saxony, Germany. He was primarily raised in Reigoldswil in Basel-Landschaft. His father, a travel agent, served one term as a member of the Grand Council of Basel-Stadt since 1968 and became the successor of James Schwarzenbach as president of the Swiss Democrats. Weber completed a commercial apprenticeship as a travel agent.

== Career ==
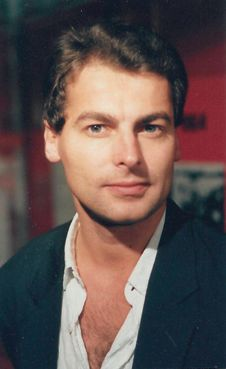
Eric Weber (1985)

Weber started his career after completing his apprenticeship at Oltner Tagblatt, a daily newspaper in Olten, Switzerland, as a volunteer in the editor's office. He was a full-time politician between 1984 and 1992. As a result of manipulations in the run-up to the 1988 Grand Council elections, Weber was convicted by the Basel Criminal Court in August 1991 and by the Court of Appeal in November 1992. Weber then moved the judgment forward to the Federal Supreme Court. In April 1994, he lost his appeal and he was ultimately convicted and declared incapacitated for five years.

Subsequently, he moved to his mothers homeland, and settled in Hof, Germany where he began to work as an independent journalist. He declared to have worked for several German newspapers, such as Freie Presse in Chemnitz, Sächsische Zeitung in Dresden and Bild. According to an article/research by Süddeutsche Zeitung he didn't actually work for Bild, and instead worked on more right-minded newspapers such as Nation Europa and Zur Zeit.

Weber stated on multiple occasions, that today he primarily lives off his income as Grand Councilor, which in 2023 is 6,000 Swiss Francs (base salary) plus attendance money of 200 Swiss Francs per attended session and same amount for additional commissional sessions. In a 2022 interview with regioTVplus, he stated that he wanted to stay in the Grand Council another thirty years, since it is 'easy money'.

== Politics ==
Weber was a member of the far-right Nationale Aktion (the predecessor of today's Swiss Democrats) and a member of the Grand Council of Basel-Stadt from 1984 to 1992 and again from 2012 to 2016. When he was first elected in 1984, he was the youngest person elected to the Grand Council of Basel-Stadt.

After attempting to participate in elections as a candidate of either the Swiss Democrats or the Swiss People's Party in 2002, Weber formed his own group, called Volksaktion gegen zuviele Ausländer und Asylanten in unserer Heimat ("popular action against too many foreigners and asylum seekers in our homeland"), participating in the 2003 federal elections. In 2006, he ran for a seat in the cantonal executive, reaching 7% of the vote. In the 2011 federal elections, Weber's Volksaktion received 810 votes, or 1.5% of the popular vote in Basel-Stadt. In the 2012 Basel elections, the party received two seats in the Grand Council.

== Personal life ==
Weber is divorced and has two daughters.

He was arrested and convicted multiple times in his life, on issues related to his political activities.
