= Anti-PowerPoint Party =

Swiss political party

Anti PowerPoint Party
- German name: Anti PowerPoint Partei
- French name: Parti Anti PowerPoint
- Italian name: Partito Anti PowerPoint
- President: Matthias Poehm
- Founder: Matthias Poehm
- Founded: 2011
- Headquarters: Bonstetten, Switzerland
- Membership: 4,632 (2021)
- Ideology: Opposition to presentation software
- Slogan: Finally do something!

Website
- Anti PowerPoint Party

The Anti PowerPoint Party (APPP) is a Swiss political party dedicated to decreasing professional use of Microsoft PowerPoint and other forms of presentation software, which the party claims "causes national-economic damage amounting to 2.1 billion CHF" annually and lowers the quality of a presentation in "95% of the cases". The party advocates flip charts as an alternative to presentation software.

APPP was formed by former software engineer Matthias Poehm ahead of the 2011 federal elections in Switzerland. Prior to founding the party, Poehm wrote a book (The PowerPoint Fallacy) opposing the use of PowerPoint. The party's goal is to become the fourth largest party in Switzerland in terms of membership, and to initiate a national "referendum in order to seek for a prohibition of PowerPoint [and other presentation software] during presentations." APPP states that it does not support prohibition, but will use a referendum to raise awareness about the cause. As of February 2021, the party had 4,632 members, making it the eighth largest party in Switzerland.

== Ideology ==
The APPP is a single-issue party. The party is not specifically opposed to PowerPoint, but to all presentation software. Poehm writes that "In some countries students and pupils are punished with a lower mark, if they give a presentation without PowerPoint. Superiors are obliging their co-workers to use PowerPoint. The fact is that the average PowerPoint presentation creates boredom."

While the party is based in Switzerland, it styles itself as a global party. The party chose to found itself in Switzerland as the requirements for forming a political party are lesser there, and out of a belief that the best way to gain media attention on the party's cause was by forming a political party.
