= Thomas Minder =

Swiss politician and businessman

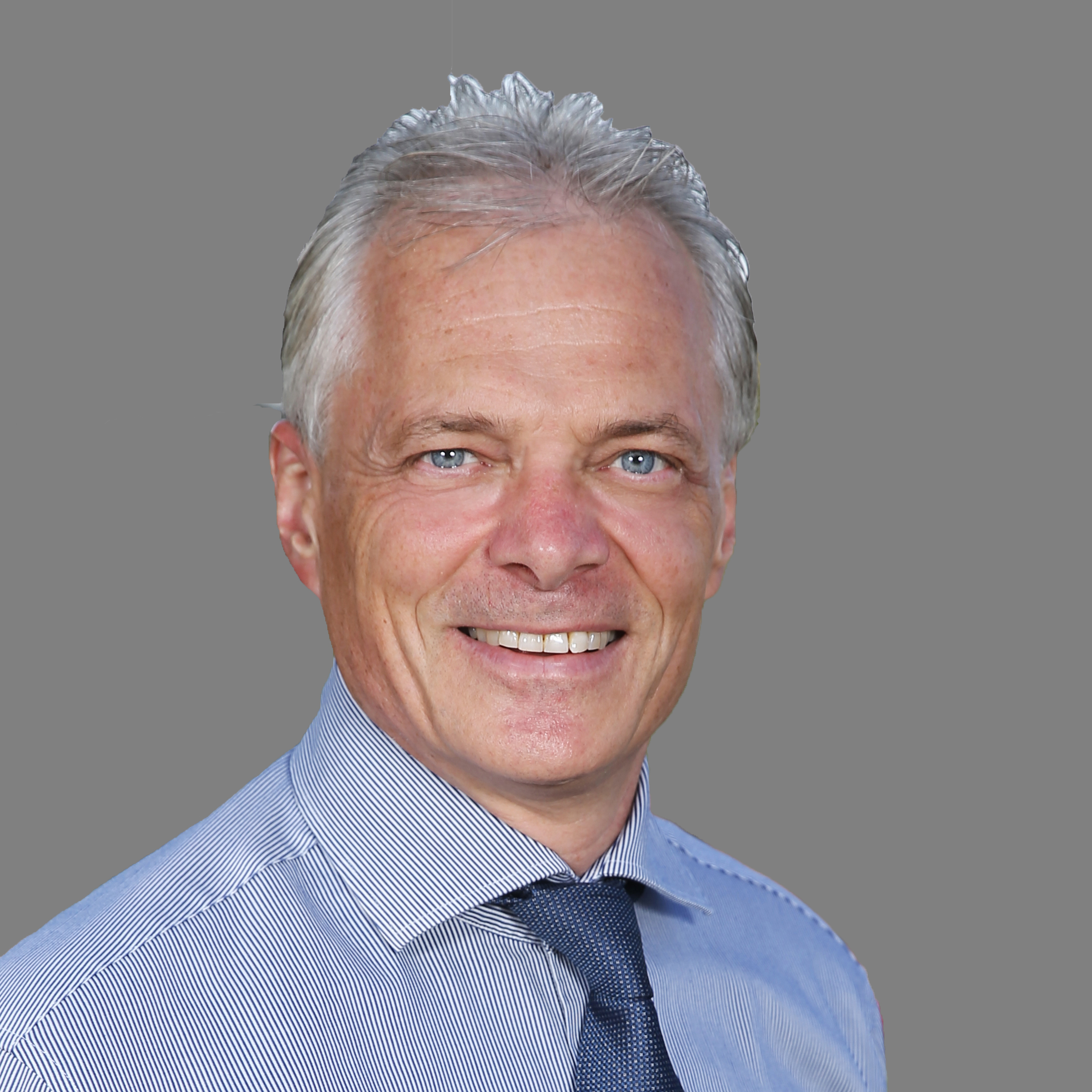
- Thomas Minder

Member of the Council of States
- In office 5 December 2011 – 2023

Personal details
- Born: 26 December 1960 (age 65) Schaffhausen
- Party: Independent (sits with SVP)
- Education: MBA from Fordham University
- Occupation: CEO of Trybol
- Profession: entrepreneur and politician
- Known for: Initiative "against the rip-off"

Thomas Minder (born 26 December 1960 in Schaffhausen, Switzerland) is a Swiss entrepreneur and politician. Minder was elected to the Swiss Council of States for the canton of Schaffhausen in 2011. He is an independent but sits with the Swiss People's Party.

He is known in Switzerland for having filed an initiative entitled "against rip-off salaries", created on 31 October 2006 and submitted on 26 February 2008, which proposed that the remuneration of executives in public Swiss companies be more tightly controlled by the shareholders. The initiative, one of the world's most restrictive on corporate governance, was accepted by 67.9% of the population and all the cantons on 3 March 2013.

He is the initiator of a Federal law to better protect the concept of "Swissness".

== Biography ==
Minder grew up in Neuhausen, attended secondary school at Rosenberg, college at the Ecole Supérieure de Commerce de Neuchâtel and Fordham University, where he obtained an MBA.

He is a first lieutenant commanding a company of fusiliers in the Swiss army. After working in Paris and Zurich, he joined the cosmetics company Trybol in 1995 and has been CEO since 2006.

Minder is single, an ornithologist and member of the World Wildlife Fund, Schaffhouse Bird and Nature Protection Association, Pro Natura, the Association for Transport and Environment and Greenpeace.

== See also ==
- Swiss referendum "against corporate Rip-offs" of 2013
