= Niklaus Pfluger =

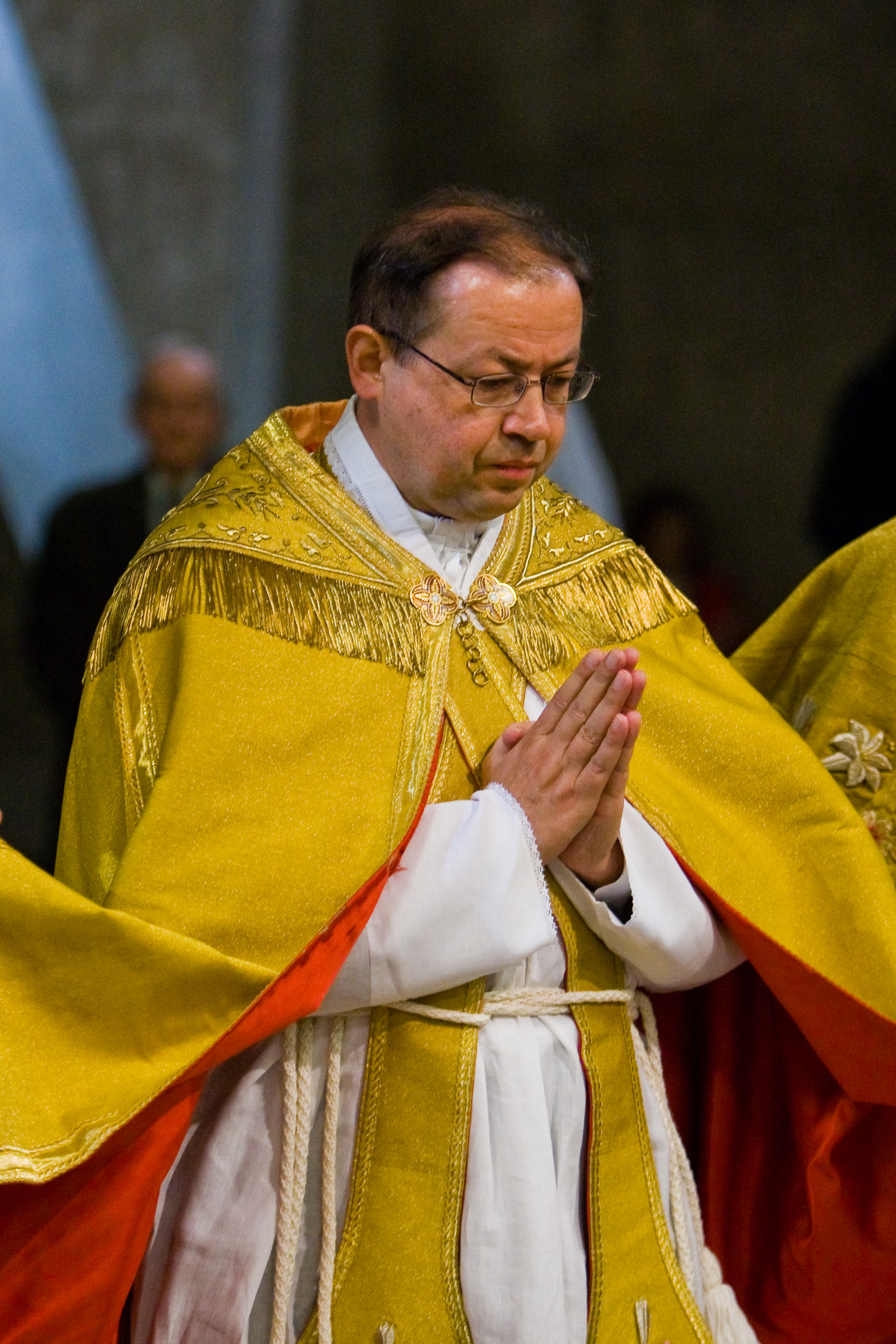
Father Niklaus Pfluger

Niklaus Pfluger, SSPX (born 3 November 1958), is a Catholic priest and the former First Assistant of the Traditional Catholic Society of St. Pius X.

== Early life and priesthood ==
Pfluger was born in Oensingen, in the canton of Solothurn, Switzerland, November 3, 1958. He was ordained a priest July 1, 1984, at Zaitzkofen (Bavaria, Germany) by Archbishop Marcel Lefebvre. In 1989, after 5 years of apostolate at Oberriet, Switzerland, then at Basel, he was named District Superior of the Society of St. Pius X in Switzerland. In 1991, he became the Rector of the Society of St. Pius X Seminary in Zaitzkofen, Germany. In 1998, he returned to Switzerland once again as District Superior of the Society of St. Pius X in that country. In 2004, he was named District Superior for the Society of St. Pius X in Germany. In 2006, at the General Chapter of the Society of St. Pius X, he was elected First Assistant to Bishop Bernard Fellay the Superior General. First Assistant to the Superior General is the second most important position in the Society of St. Pius X. As a member of the General Council with Bishop Fellay and the Second Assistant, Father Alain Nelly, he took part in deliberations concerning the most important questions of the Society of St. Pius X.

His term ended in 2018 when Father Christian Bouchacourt was elected as the new First Assistant to the new General Superior, Fr. Davide Pagliarani.
