= Hannes Germann =

Swiss politician (born 1956)

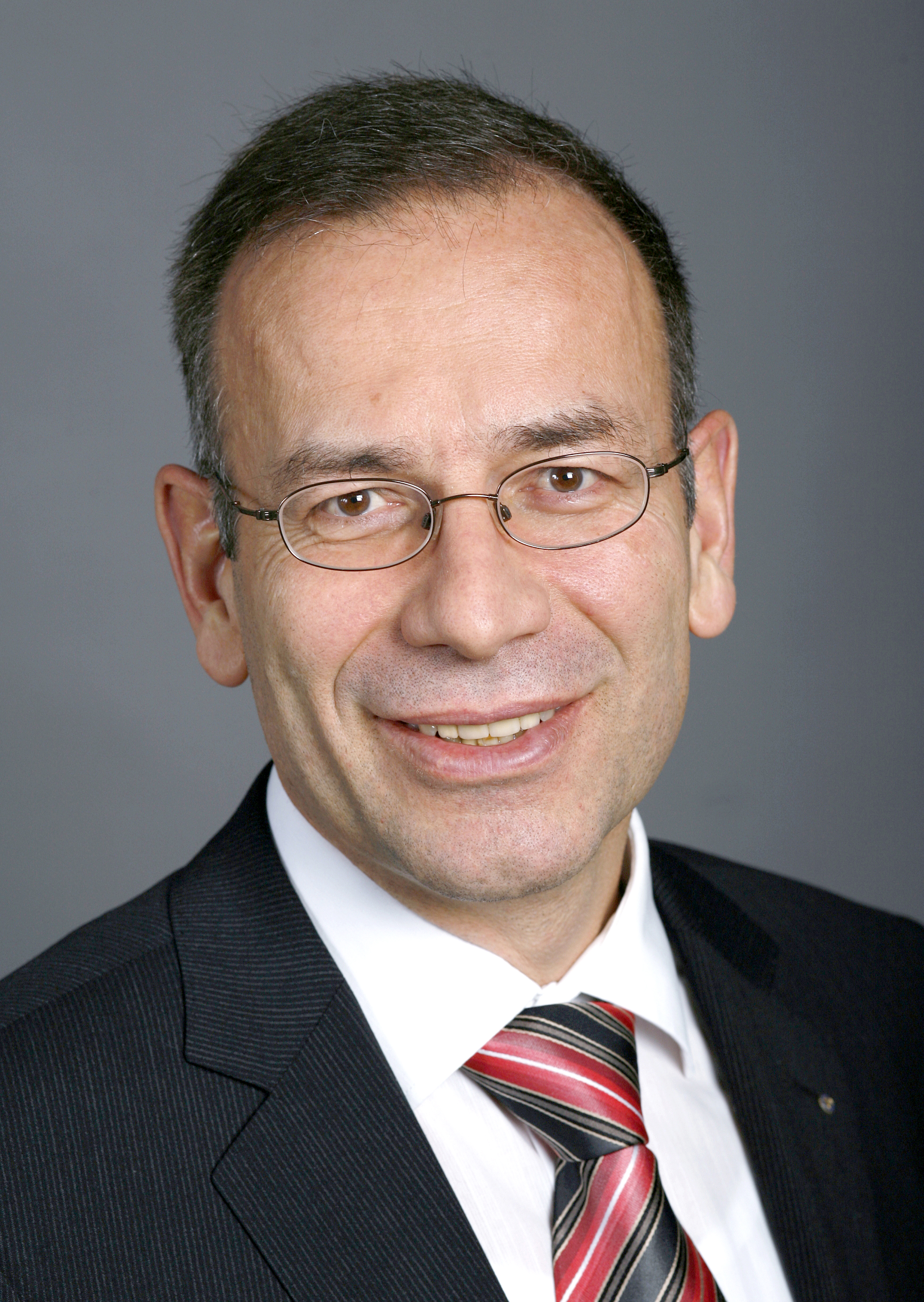

President of the Swiss Council of States
- In office 24 November 2013 – 24 November 2014
- Preceded by: Filippo Lombardi
- Succeeded by: Claude Hêche

Member of the Council of States
- Incumbent
- Assumed office 16 September 2002

Personal details
- Born: 1 July 1956 (age 68); Schaffhausen, Switzerland
- Political party: Swiss People's Party

Hannes Germann (born 1 July 1956) is a Swiss politician and current member of the Swiss Council of States for the Canton of Schaffhausen. Elected to the council in 2002, he is a member of the Swiss People's Party (SVP/UDC).

Political offices
Preceded by Filippo Lombardi	President of the Swiss Council of States; 2013–2014	Succeeded by Claude Hêche
