= Raphaël Comte =

Swiss lawyer and politician

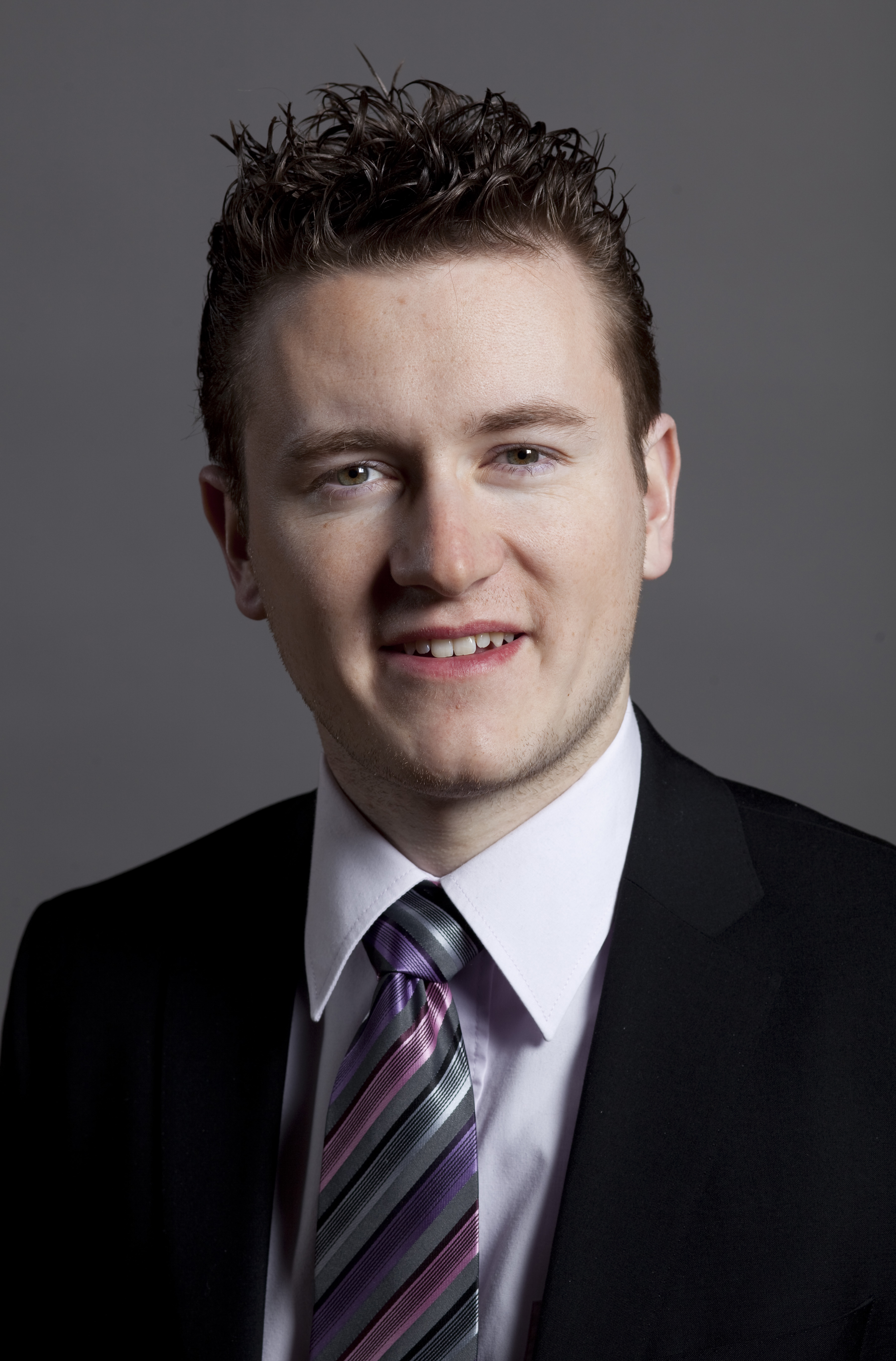
- Raphaël Comte in 2010

Member of the Council of States
- In office 1 March 2010 – 1 December 2019

President of the Council of States
- In office 30 November 2015 – 28 November 2016
- Preceded by: Claude Hêche
- Succeeded by: Ivo Bischofberger

Personal details
- Born: 28 September 1979 (age 46) Neuchâtel, Switzerland
- Party: FDP.The Liberals
- Occupation: Lawyer, politician

Raphaël Comte (French pronunciation: [ʁafaɛl kɔ̃t]; born 28 September 1979) is a Swiss lawyer and politician. He has served as a member of the Council of States from 1 March 2010 to 1 December 2019, and was its president from 2015 to 2016.

A member of the Swiss delegation to the Parliamentary Assembly of the Council of Europe since 2012, Comte serves as member of the Committee on Legal Affairs and Human Rights and the Committee on Culture, Science, Education and Media. In addition, he is currently the Assembly's rapporteur on human rights in Ukraine as well as on the protection and preservation of Jewish heritage sites.

Preceded by Claude Hêche	President of the Council of States; 2015/2016	Succeeded by Ivo Bischofberger
