= Social Liberal Movement =

Swiss political party

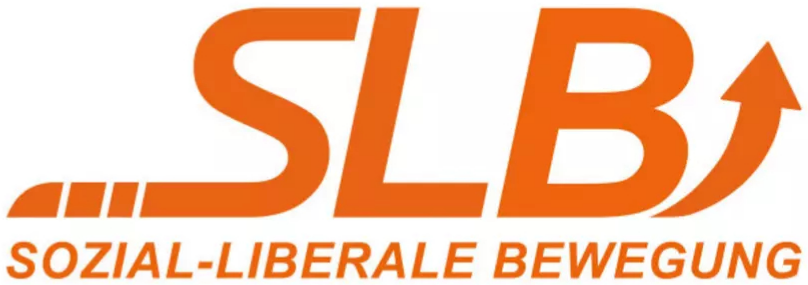
- German name: Sozial-Liberale Bewegung
- French name: Mouvement socio-libéral
- Italian name: Movimento social-liberale
- President: Samuel Schmid
- Founded: 23 April 2011
- Headquarters: Balderstrasse 13; 3007 Berne
- Ideology: Social conservatism
- Colours: Orange
- National Council: 0 / 200
- Council of States: 0 / 46
- Cantonal legislatures: 0 / 2,609

The Social Liberal Movement (SLM; German: Sozial-Liberale Bewegung, French: Mouvement socio-libéral, Italian: Movimento social-liberale) is a social conservative party in Switzerland.

The SLM was founded on 23 April 2011 by Samuel Schmid, a member of the Grand Council of Aargau originally elected from the right-wing Federal Democratic Union. He was joined in June by Ricardo Lumengo, a member of the National Council originally elected from the centre-left Social Democratic Party.

The SLM has branches in Aargau, Bern and Zurich, and claims hundreds of members. It won no seats in the 2011 federal election, but 0.5% of the vote in Aargau and 0.3% of the vote in Bern.
