= Martin Schmid (politician) =

Swiss politician

Member of the Council of States of Switzerland
- Incumbent
- Assumed office 5 December 2011

Personal details
- Born: 24 May 1969 (age 56) Thusis, Switzerland

Martin Schmid is a Swiss politician who is a member of the Council of States.

== Biography ==
Schmid was elected in 2011.
