= Alternative Left =

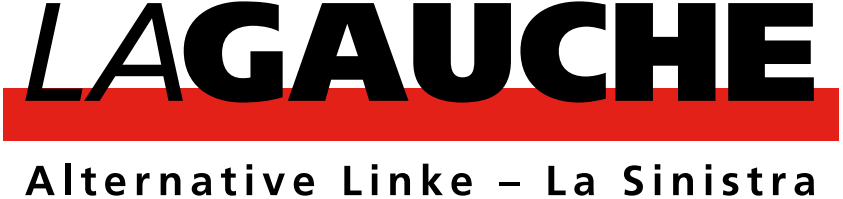
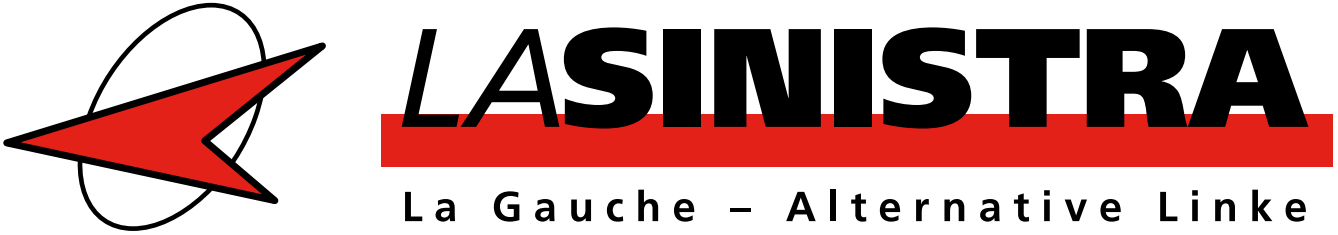
- German name: Alternative Linke (AL)
- French name: La Gauche (LG)
- Italian name: La Sinistra
- Romansh name: L'Alternativa sanestra
- Founded: 29 May 2010
- Headquarters: 2722 Les Reussilles
- Membership (2011): 2,000
- Ideology: Democratic socialism
- Political position: Left-wing
- National Council: 0 / 200
- Council of States: 0 / 46
- Cantonal legislatures: 10 / 2,609

The Alternative Left (German: Alternative Linke; Romansh: L'Alternativa sanestra) or The Left (French: La Gauche; Italian: La Sinistra), is a political party of the left in the Canton of Bern, Switzerland that existed at the national level from 2010 to 2018. This party sought to unite the political forces and movements farther to the left on Switzerland's political spectrum than the centre-left Social Democratic Party and the Green Party.

== History ==
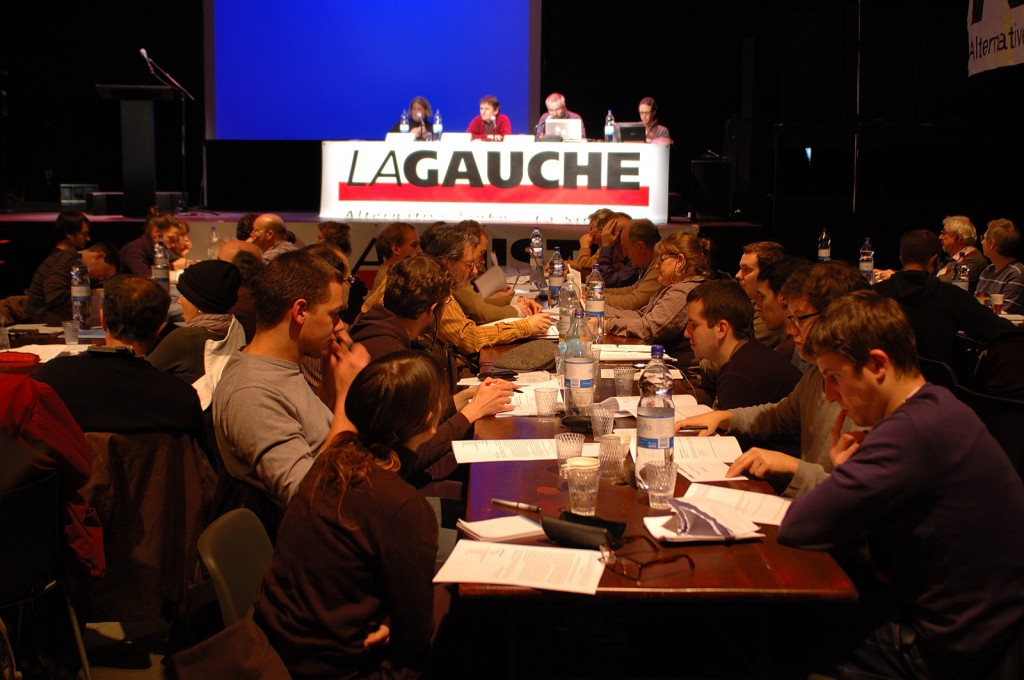
2011 congress in Zurich

After an opening party congress on 21 November 2009, in Schaffhausen, the party was officially founded six months later at the congress of Lausanne on 29 May 2010. In that congress the party presented a program of nine important political points. The third congress took place in Zurich on 5 March 2011, where party members voted to launch a national referendum blocking the flat-rate tax incentive favoring foreign millionaires which financial lobbies had sought to enthrone as a Swiss constitutional amendment. The same referendum in the canton of Zurich, originating with the Alternative List, was earlier approved in that Canton by Zurich's voters with a 52.9% majority in February 2009. The third congress was at the 30th juny in Biel with a discussion with Stéphane Hessel in the afternoon.

The national organisation got dissolved in 2018.

== Sections ==
In total the "Alternative Left" counted six official sections:

- Alternative Linke Bern
- La Gauche Valais Romand
- La Gauche Arc jurassien
- La Gauche Vaud
- La Gauche Nyon
- La Gauche Genève

These sections consisted of a few people and did not operate as active party sections. Most of these listed sections are inactive and have always operated individually.

There are other groups, that were losely involved in the AL, but were never official members of the party:

- Alternative List Zürich
- Alternative List Winterthur
- Alternative List Limmattal
- Alternative List Schaffhausen

== Electoral results ==
=== Parliament ===
National Council
Election year	# of overall votes	% of overall vote	# of overall seats won	+/–
2011	21,482	0.88	0 / 200	—
