= Pirmin Bischof =

Swiss politician

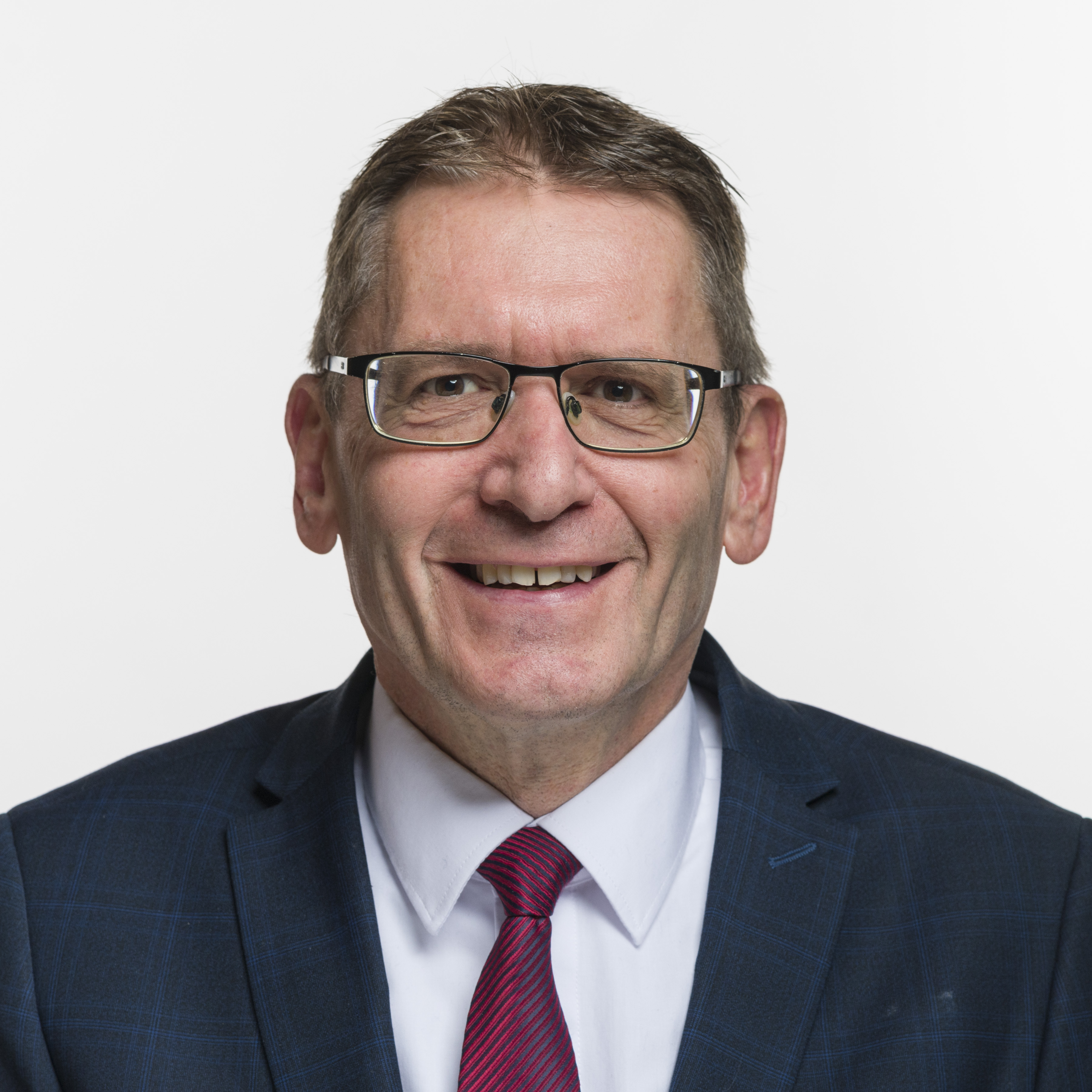

Member of the Council of States of Switzerland
- Constituency: Soleure
- Incumbent
- Assumed office 11 December 2011

Member of the National Council
- In office 3 December 2007 – 11 December 2011

Personal details
- Born: 24 February 1959 (age 67) Solothurn
- Party: The Centre
- Education: University of Bern; Harvard Law School (LLM)
- Occupation: Lawyer

Pirmin Bischof (born 24 February 1959) is a Swiss politician who is a member of the Council of States of Switzerland.

== Biography ==
He was elected in 2007 to the National Council and re e-elected in 2011, and later elected to the Council of States in 2015.

== Political career ==
He has been a member of the executive of the city of Solothurn since May 1997. From April 2005 to November 2007, he also sat in the parliament of the canton of Solothurn.

In the 2011 federal elections, he was re-elected to the National Council, before being elected in the second round of voting as the representative of the canton of Solothurn to the Council of States. He was re-elected in the first round in 2023.
