= Communist Party (Switzerland) =

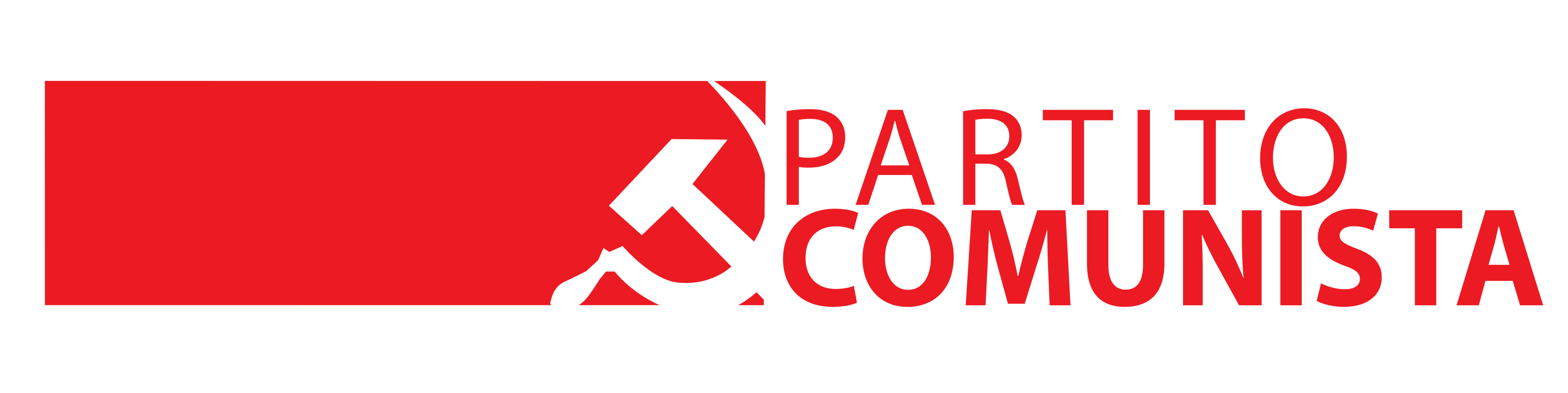
- Italian name: Partito Comunista
- Secretary: Massimiliano Arif Ay
- Members of the Federal Council: none
- Founded: May 1944
- Split from: Swiss Party of Labour (2014)
- Headquarters: Via Varenna 66; 6600 Locarno (Solduno)
- Youth wing: Swiss Communist Youth
- Membership (2018): 120
- Ideology: Communism; Marxism-Leninism
- International affiliation: IMCWP; World Anti-Imperialist Platform; Sovintern (Since 2026)
- Colours: Red
- National Council: 0 / 200
- Council of States: 0 / 46
- Cantonal legislatures: 2 / 2,559

Website
- www.partitocomunista.ch

The Communist Party (Italian: Partito Comunista) is a political party mostly active in Southern Switzerland, Ticino and Grisons. From October 1944 until 2007, it acted as the Ticino section of the Swiss Party of Labour. In 2007, it decided to change its name to the Communist Party. In 2014, the party severed its ties with the Party of Labour. Its headquarters are in Locarno, Ticino.

== History ==
In 2014, the party stopped its collaboration with the Swiss Party of Labour after 70 years of affiliation. The cantonal party renamed itself, and is now mainly active in the canton of Ticino and in the canton of Grisons, with cells in Geneva and in other cities. The current General Secretary is Massimiliano Arif Ay, elected in 2009. It gained one seat in Ticino's parliament in 2015, and increased its seat count to 2 in 2019.

== Youth wing ==
The Swiss Communist Youth is the youth wing of the Communist Party. Its General Secretary is Luca Frei.
