= Claude Hêche =

Swiss politician (born 1952)

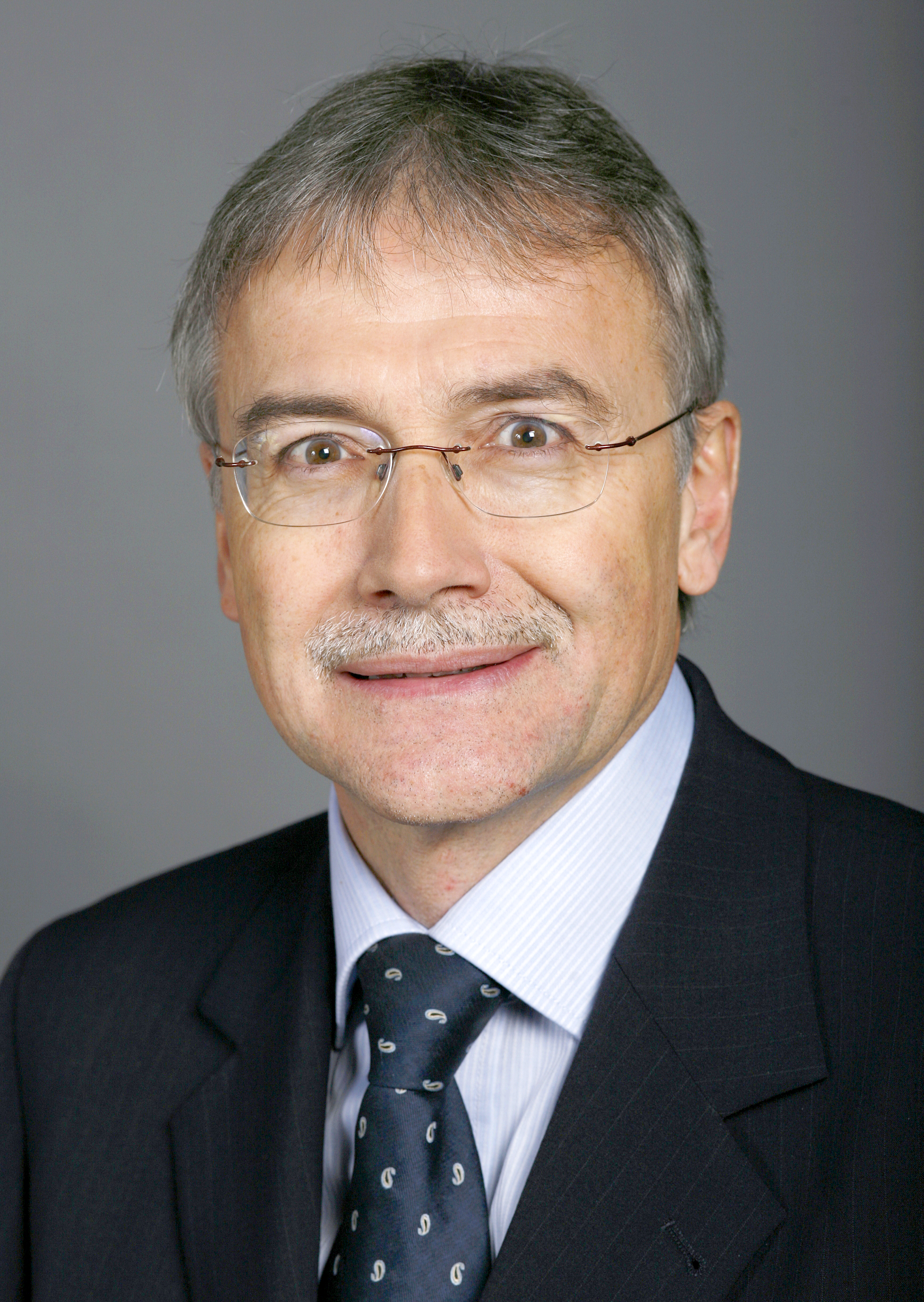
Hêche in 2007

Claude Hêche (French pronunciation: [klod ɛʃ]; born 20 December 1952) is a Swiss politician. He was a member of the Council of States from 2007 to 2019 and served as President of the National Council in the 2014-2015 session.

Hêche was elected to the Council of States by the Canton of Jura in 2007. He is a member of the Social Democratic Party (SPS/PSS). From 1995 to 2007, he was a member of the government of the canton of Jura.

Preceded by Hannes Germann	President of the Council of States; 2014/2015	Succeeded by Raphaël Comte
