= Paul Rechsteiner =

Swiss attorney, union leader and politician

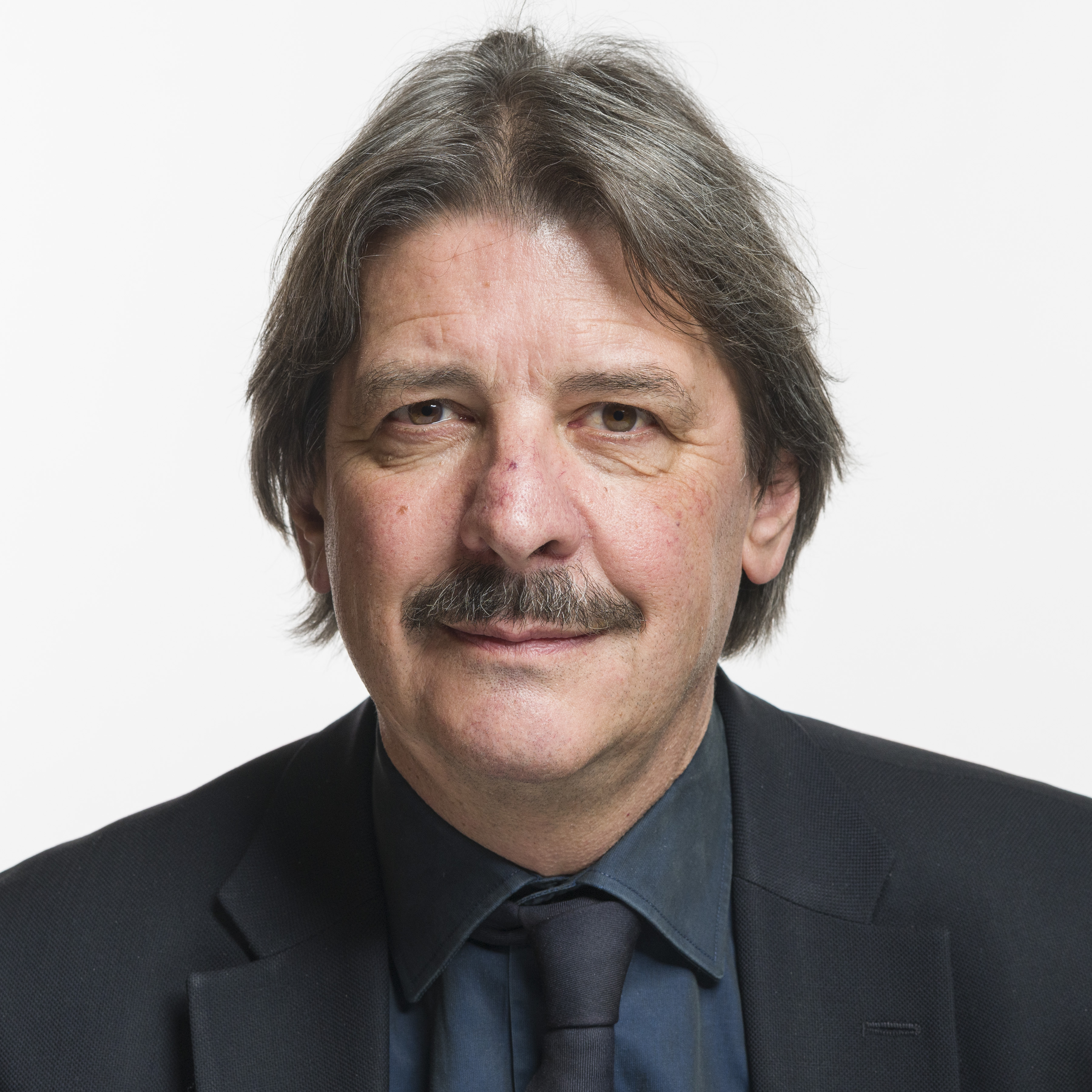
- Paul Rechsteiner (2019)

Member of the Council of States (Switzerland)
- In office 12 December 2011 – 16 December 2022
- Constituency: Canton of St. Gallen
- Succeeded by: Esther Friedli

Member of the National Council (Switzerland)
- In office 2 June 1986 – 11 December 2011

Personal details
- Born: Paul Rechsteiner; August 26, 1952 (age 73) St. Gallen, Canton of St. Gallen, Switzerland
- Party: Social Democrat
- Occupation: Attorney, union leader and politician

Paul Rechsteiner (/rəkstəənər/; reck-steener born 26 August 1952) is a Swiss attorney, union leader and former politician. He served as a member of the National Council (Switzerland) from 1986 to 2011 and from 2011 to 2022 as a member of the Council of States (Switzerland) for the Social Democratic Party for the St. Gallen constituency. Between 1998 and 2018 he was the president of the Swiss Trade Union Federation (SGB). He was among the most influential Swiss politicians.

== Early life and education ==
Rechsteiner was born 26 August 1952 in St. Gallen, Switzerland. He was raised in a working-class family. His parents had modest occupations, his father being an unskilled worker, his mother being a cleaner. He was a gifted student and was encouraged to study. He completed a licentiate in law at the University of Fribourg and in Berlin.

== Career ==
In 1980, Rechsteiner started to practice law as independent attorney in St. Gallen with a focus on Labour law, Criminal law and Social Security Law. From 1998 and 2011 he was the president of the Swiss Trade Union Federation (SGB). From 1998 he has also been a member of the Paul Grüninger Foundation, which he chairs since 2019.

== Politics ==
Between 1977 and 1984 he served on the city council of St. Gallen, and at the same time chaired the Social Democratic Party of St. Gallen. Between 1984 and 1986, Rechsteiner served on the Cantonal Council of St. Gallen, from 1986 to 2011 as a member of the National Council (Switzerland) and from 2011 to 2022 as a member of the Council of States (Switzerland).

== Personal life ==
Rechsteiner is married and resides in St. Gallen.
