= Roberto Zanetti (politician) =

Swiss politician

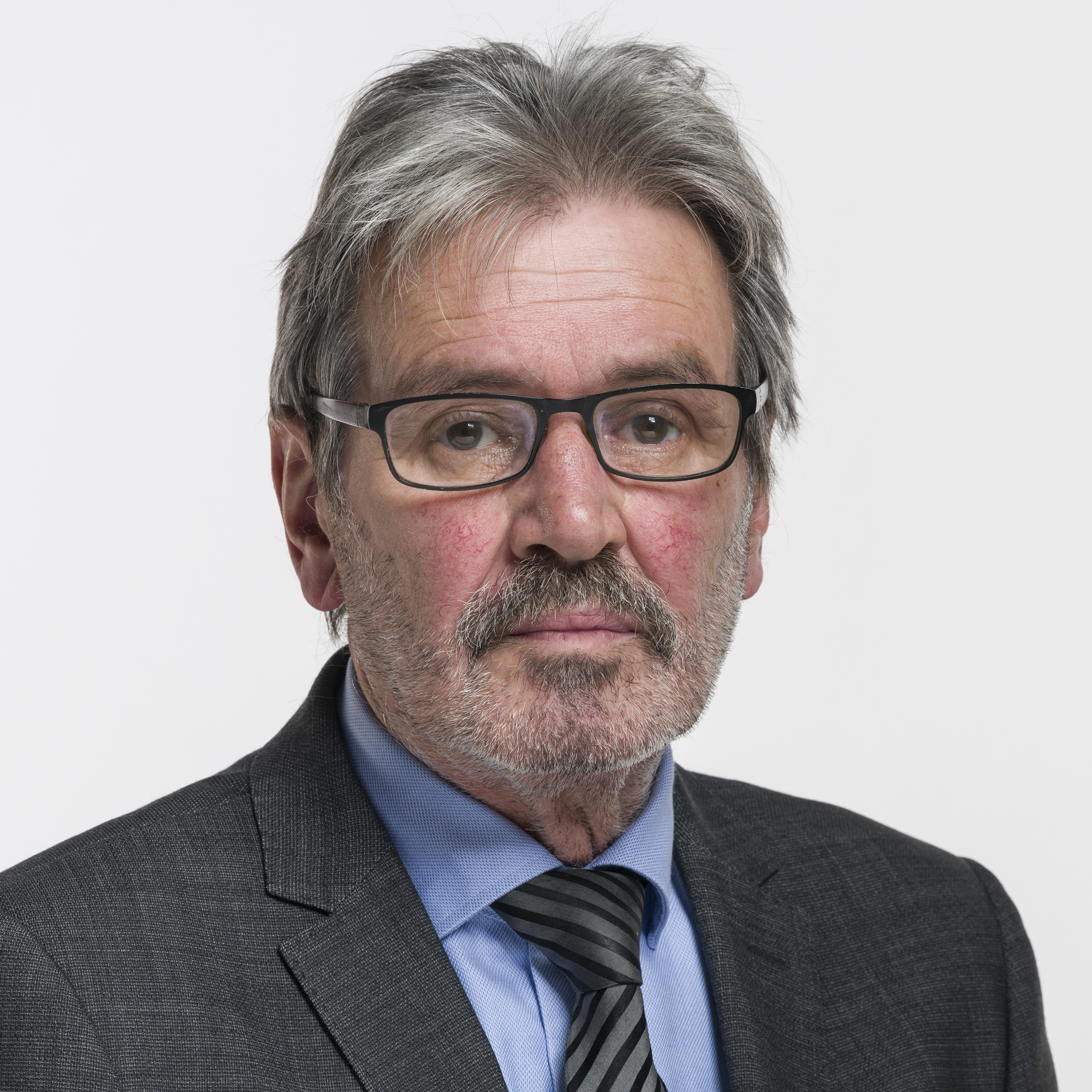

Member of the Council of States of Switzerland
- Incumbent
- Assumed office 1 March 2010

Member of the National Council
- In office 6 December 1999 – 30 November 2003

Personal details
- Born: December 14, 1954 (age 71) Soleure, Switzerland

Roberto Zanetti is a Swiss politician who is a member of the Council of States of Switzerland.

== Biography ==
He was elected in 2010.
