= 2007 Swiss Council of States election =

- 21 October, 11 November, 18 November and 25 November 2007

All 46 seats to the Swiss Council of States
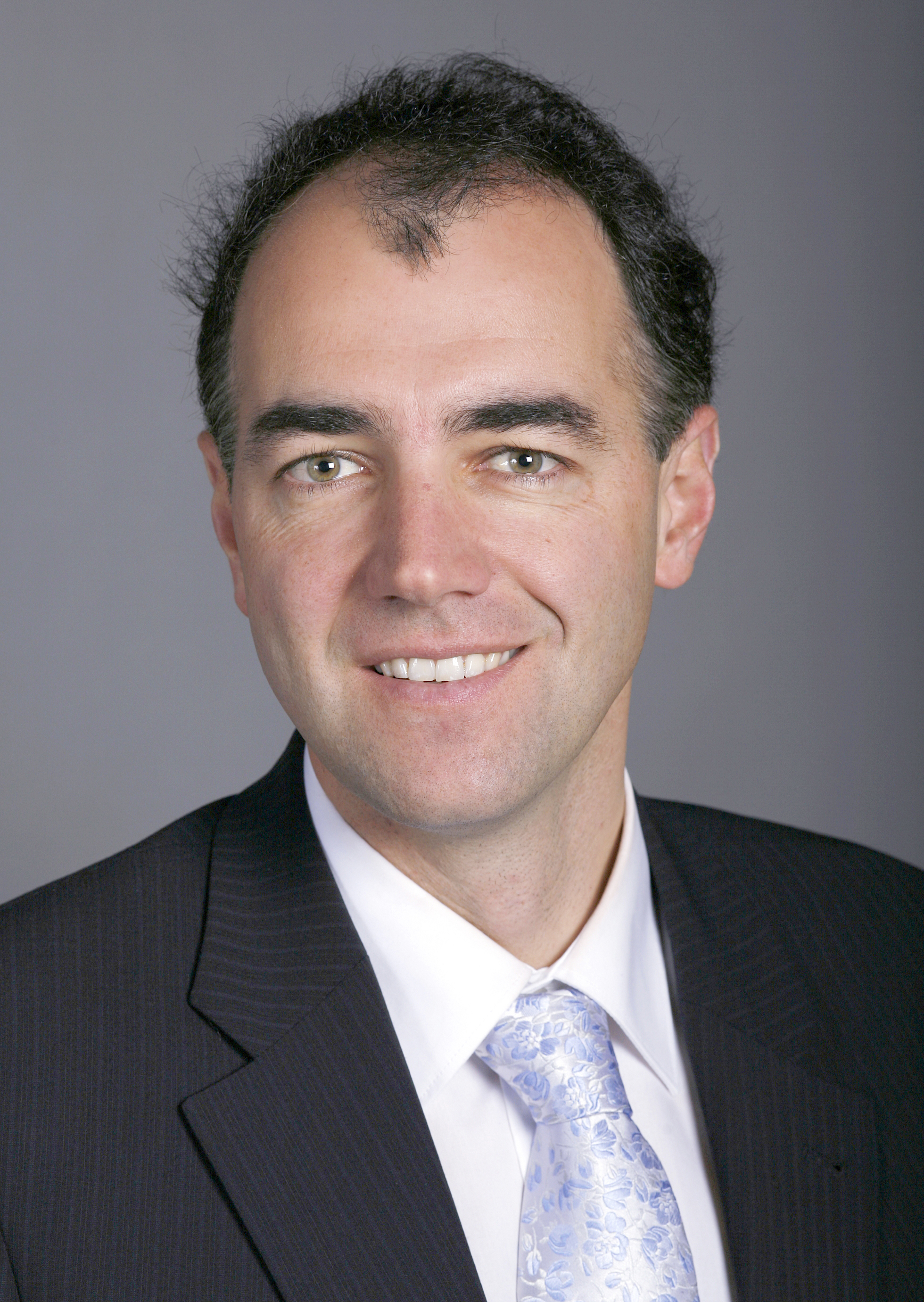

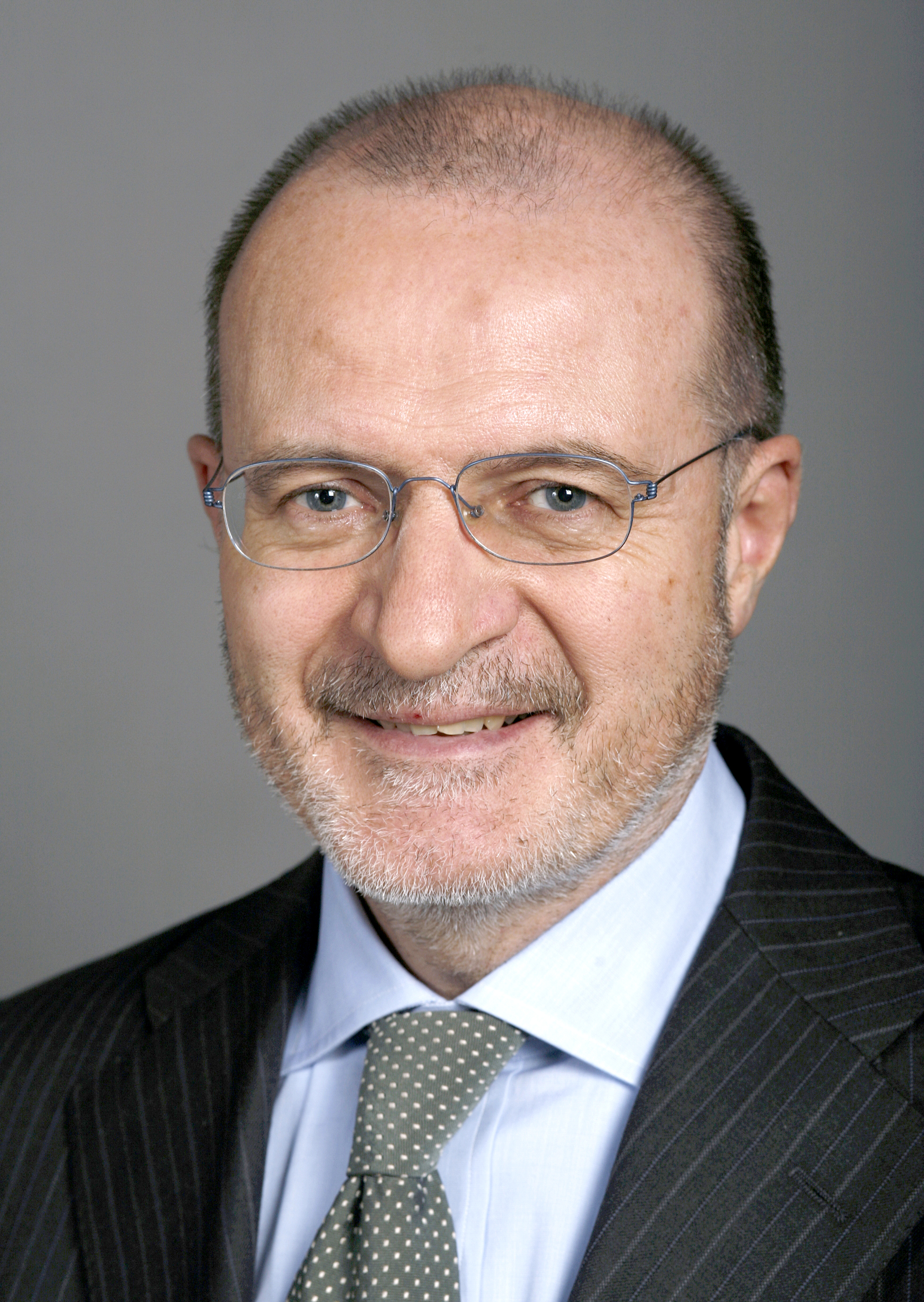

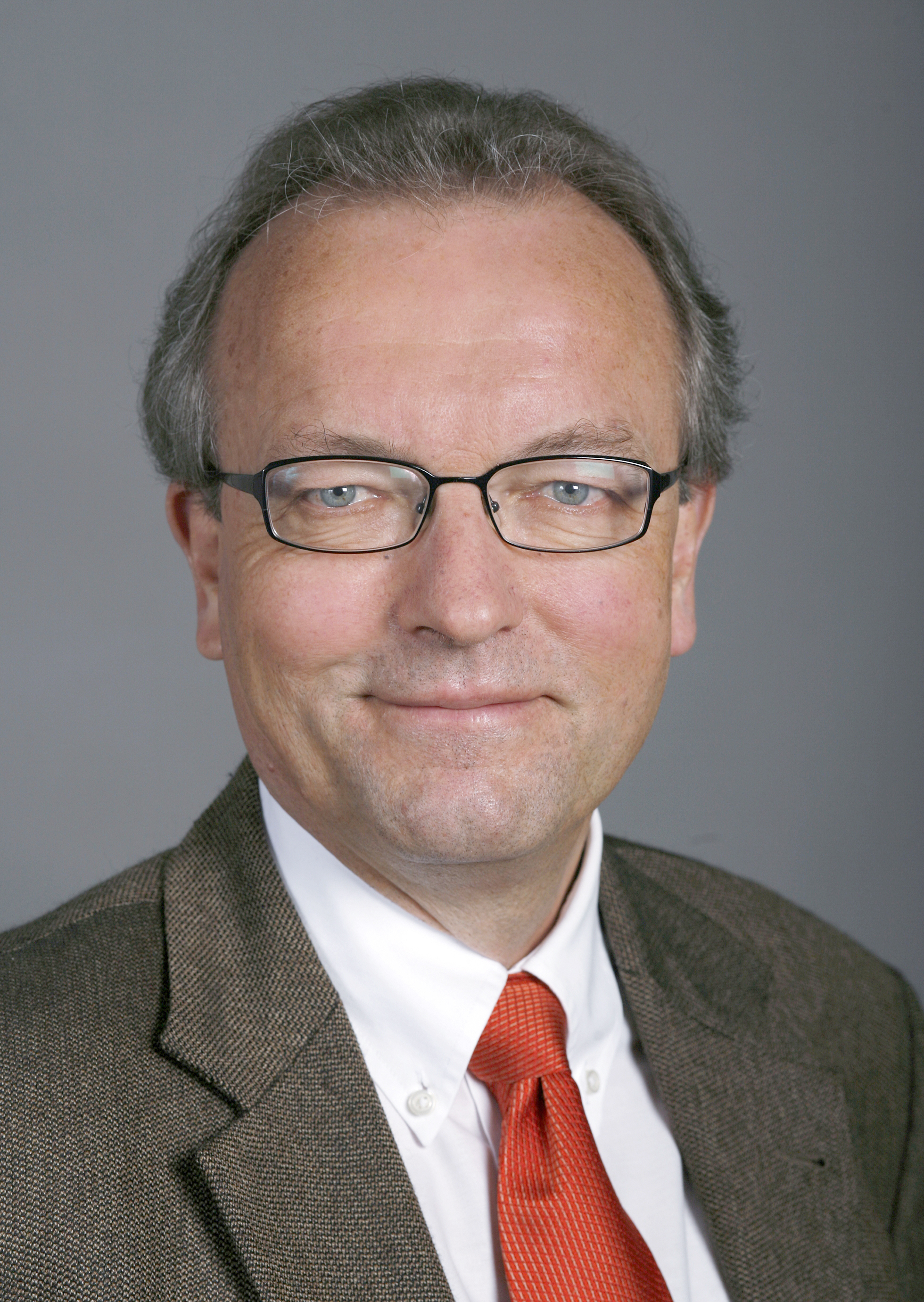

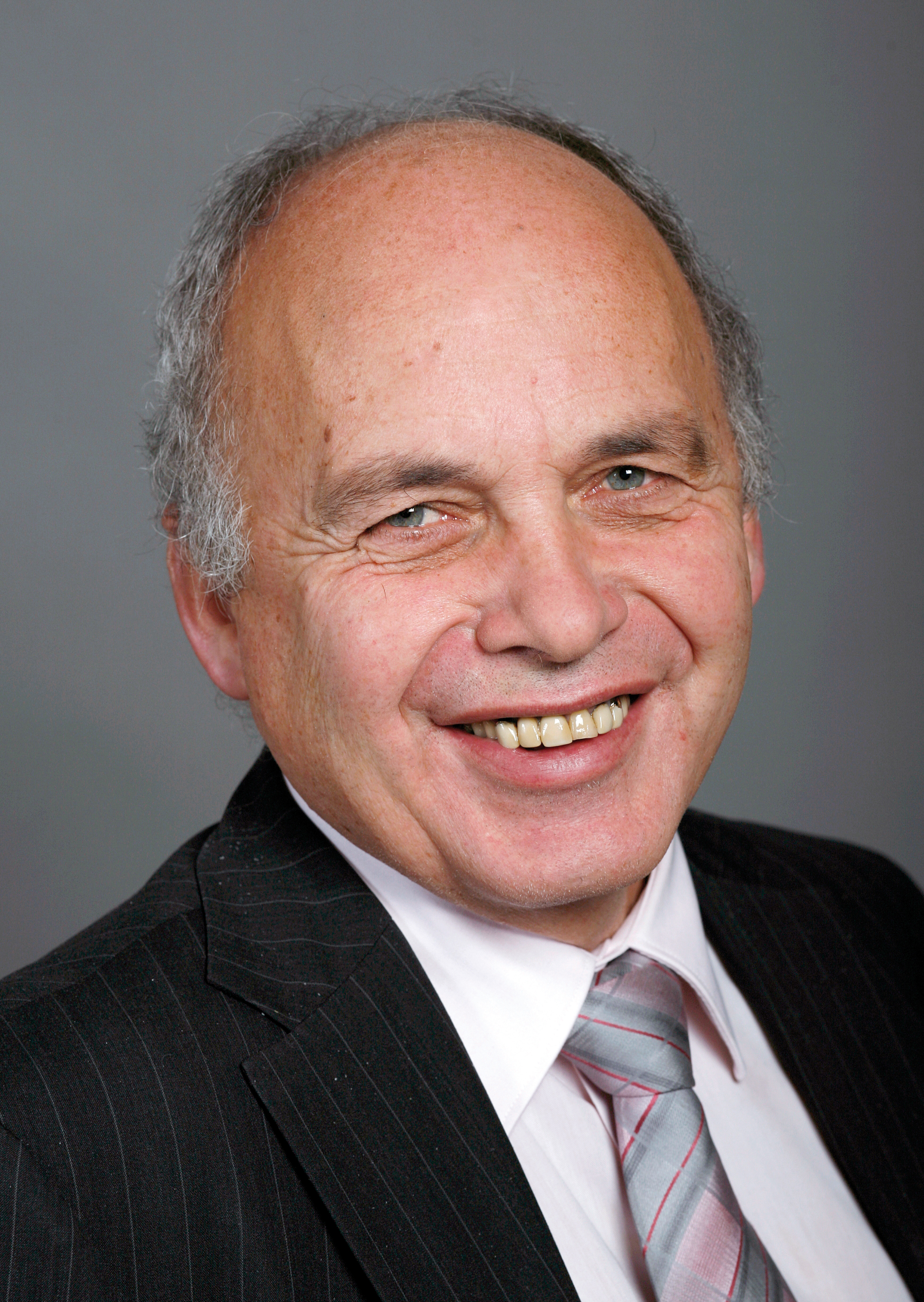

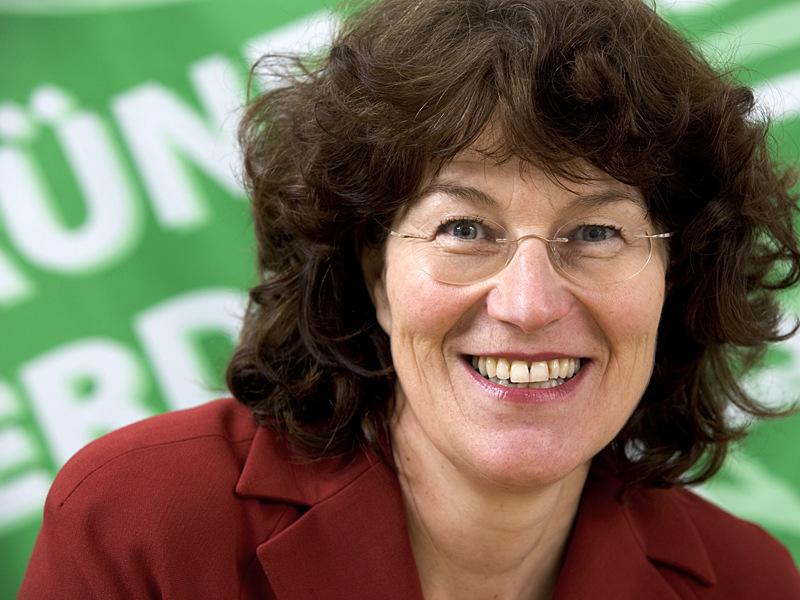

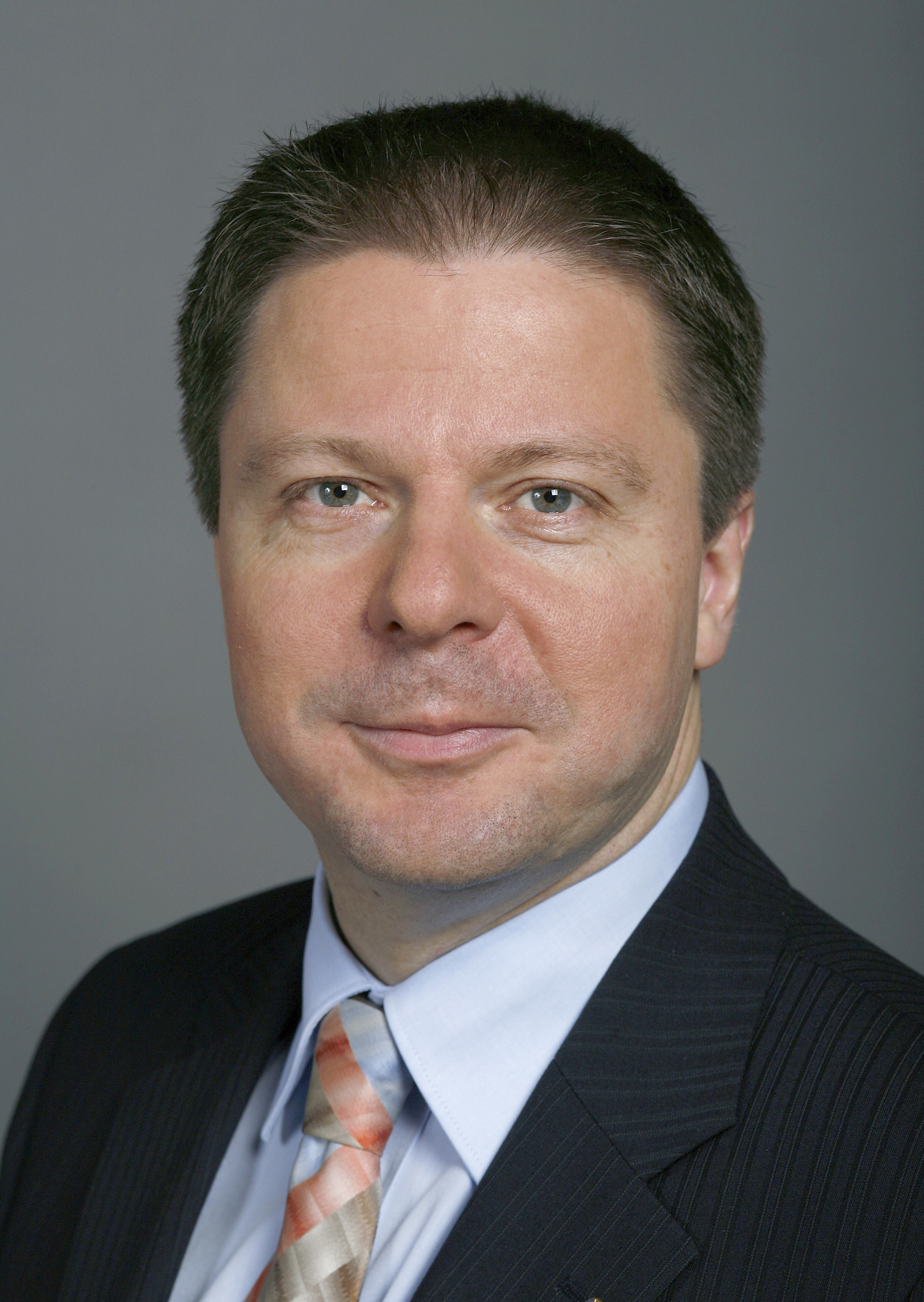
	First party	Second party	Third party
Leader	Christophe Darbellay	Fulvio Pelli	Hans-Jürg Fehr
Party	Christian Democrats	Free Democrats	Social Democrats
Last election	15 seats	14 seats	9 seats
Seats won	15	12	9
Seat change	Steady	▼2	Steady
	Fourth party	Fifth party	Sixth party
Leader	Ueli Maurer	Ruth Genner	Martin Bäumle
Party	Swiss People's	Greens	Green Liberals
Last election	8 seats	0 seats	0
Seats won	7	2	1
Seat change	▼1	▲2	▲1

Elections were held to the Council of States of Switzerland in October and November 2007 as part of the 2007 federal election. All 46 members of the Council of States were elected from all cantons of Switzerland. The first round was held on 21 October. In eight cantons, not all seats were filled in the first round, and a second round was held on 11 November, 18 November, or 25 November.

The election was a breakthrough for the Green Party, which won its first two seats in the Council of States, and the Green Liberal Party (GLP), which won a seat only four months after it split from the Greens. These gains – the first time minor parties had won representation in the Council of States since 1995 – came at the expense of the Free Democratic Party, which lost two seats, and the Swiss People's Party, which lost its seat in its stronghold of Zurich to the GLP.

== Results ==
The Council of States election was not finalized with the first run on 21 October; twelve seats remained to be distributed in second round elections on 11 November, 18 November or 25 November 2007.

The second round saw a number of notable races, for instance the election for the second seat in Zürich, where SP candidate Chantal Galladé agreed to withdraw and support GLP candidate Verena Diener against SVP candidate Ueli Maurer, increasing the centre-left's changes in the second round. In St. Gallen, where no one was elected in the first round, FDP candidate Erika Forster and CVP candidate Eugen David, both incumbents, started a common campaign for reelection against SVP candidate Toni Brunner. Four candidates contested the election for the two seats in Tessin -- Dick Marty (FDP, over 40,000 votes in the first round), Filippo Lombardi (CVP), Franco Cavalli (SP) -- both of whom had over 30,000 votes—and finally Attilio Bignasca (Lega). The two incumbents from the FDP and CVP were reelected on 18 November.

The second seat for Lucerne was handed to CVP candidate Konrad Graber in so-called "silent election" when no other candidate filed to run against him in the second round. Graber had narrowly failed to be elected in the first round. The second mandate in Fribourg and Valais was also decided in this way.

Party	Seats	+/–
Christian Democratic People's Party	15	0
Free Democratic Party	12	–2
Social Democratic Party	9	0
Swiss People's Party	7	–1
Green Party	2	+2
Green Liberal Party	1	+1
Total	46	0
Source: Nohlen & Stöver

=== By canton ===
==== Appenzell Ausserrhoden ====
2007 Council of States election: Appenzell Ausserrhoden
Party	Candidate	Votes	%	±%
Free Democrats	Hans Altherr	10,880	87.9	
Independent	Vereinzelte	1,012	8.2	
Independent	Edgar Bischof	310	2.5	
Independent	Ivo Müller	98	0.8	
Independent	Matthias Weishaupt	84	0.7	
Turnout		12,384		
Free Democrats hold		Swing		

==== Appenzell Innerrhoden ====
2007 Council of States election: Appenzell Innerrhoden
Party	Candidate	Votes	%	±%
Christian Democrats	Ivo Bischofberger			
Turnout				
Christian Democrats hold		Swing		

==== Aargau ====
2007 Council of States election: Aargau
Party	Candidate	Votes	%	±%
Free Democrats	Christine Egerszegi-Obrist	98,961	29.5	
Swiss People's	Maximilian Reimann	92,814	27.6	
Social Democrats	Pascale Bruderer	62,780	18.7	
Greens	Geri Müller	31,417	9.4	
Christian Democrats	Esther Egger	2,3843	7.1	
Evangelical People's	Heiner Studer	16,884	5.0	
Independent	Pius Lischer	6,152	1.8	
Independent	René Bertschinger	3,147	0.9	
Turnout		335,998		
Free Democrats hold		Swing		
Swiss People's hold		Swing		

==== Basel-Landschaft ====
2007 Council of States election: Basel-Landschaft
Party	Candidate	Votes	%	±%
Social Democrats	Claude Janiak	47,473	58.5	
Swiss People's	Erich Straumann	28,054	34.6	
Independent	Vereinzelte	5,618	6.9	
Turnout		81,145		
Social Democrats gain from Free Democrats		Swing		

==== Basel-Stadt ====
2007 Council of States election: Basel-Stadt
Party	Candidate	Votes	%	±%
Social Democrats	Anita Fetz	32,736	60.4	
Liberals	Andreas Albrecht	17,344	32.0	
Independent	Eric Weber	3,631	6.7	
Independent	Vereinzelte	460	0.8	
Turnout		54,171		
Social Democrats hold		Swing		

==== Bern ====
2007 Council of States election: Bern
Party	Candidate	Votes	%	±%
Social Democrats	Simonetta Sommaruga	164,557	29.1	
Swiss People's	Werner Luginbühl	143,347	25.3	
Greens	Franziska Teuscher	108,597	19.2	
Free Democrats	Dora Andres	108,017	19.1	
Evangelical People's	Walter Donzé	17,789	3.1	
Federal Democrats	Christian Waber	14,374	2.5	
Swiss Democrats	Adrian Wyss	9,073	1.6	
Turnout		565,754		
Social Democrats hold		Swing		
Swiss People's hold		Swing		

==== Fribourg ====
2007 Council of States election: Fribourg – First round
Party	Candidate	Votes	%	±%
Christian Democrats	Urs Schwaller	47,202	37.1	
Social Democrats	Alain Berset	35,068	27.6	
Free Democrats	Jean-Claude Cornu	25,165	19.8	
Swiss People's	Jean-François Rime	19,782	15.5	
Turnout		127,217		
Christian Democrats hold		Swing		

2007 Council of States election: Fribourg – Second round
Party	Candidate	Votes	%	±%
Social Democrats	Alain Berset			
Social Democrats hold		Swing		

==== Geneva ====
2007 Council of States election: Geneva
Party	Candidate	Votes	%	±%
Social Democrats	Liliane Maury Pasquier	49,046	26.6	
Greens	Robert Cramer	45,452	24.7	
Liberals	Martine Brunschwig Graf	37,964	20.6	
Christian Democrats	Jean-Pierre Jobin	26,816	14.6	
Swiss People's	Soli Pardo	22,014	11.9	
Independent	Claude Tamborini	3,000	1.6	
Turnout		184,292		
Social Democrats hold		Swing		
Greens gain from Free Democrats		Swing		

==== Glarus ====
2007 Council of States election: Glarus
Party	Candidate	Votes	%	±%
Free Democrats	Fritz Schiesser	6,380	44.8	
Swiss People's	This Jenny	6,024	42.3	
Independent	Vereinzelte	1,834	12.9	
Turnout		14,238		
Free Democrats hold		Swing		
Swiss People's hold		Swing		

==== Graubünden ====
2007 Council of States election: Graubünden
Party	Candidate	Votes	%	±%
Swiss People's	Christoffel Brändli	27,923	44.4	
Christian Democrats	Theo Maissen	21,257	33.8	
Social Democrats	Johannes Pfenninger	8,558	13.6	
Independent	Vereinzelte	5,139	8.2	
Turnout		62,877		
Swiss People's hold		Swing		
Christian Democrats hold		Swing		

==== Jura ====
2007 Council of States election: Jura
Party	Candidate	Votes	%	±%
Social Democrats	Claude Hêche	7,965	18.9	
Christian Democrats	Anne Seydoux-Christe	6,322	15.0	
Christian Democrats	Madeleine Amgwerd	5,992	14.2	
Social Democrats	Christophe Berdat	5,907	14.0	
Christian Social	Pierre-Olivier Cattin	3,079	7.3	
Free Democrats	Jean-Frédéric Gerber	2,968	7.0	
Swiss People's	Frédéric Juillerat	2,869	6.8	
Swiss People's	Olivier Allimann	2,804	6.7	
Free Democrats	Pascal Haenni	2,194	5.2	
Christian Social	Pascal Prince	2,052	4.9	
Turnout		42,152		
Social Democrats hold		Swing		
Christian Democrats hold		Swing		

==== Lucerne ====
2007 Council of States election: Lucerne – First round
Party	Candidate	Votes	%	±%
Free Democrats	Helen Leumann-Würsch	65,269	29.6	
Christian Democrats	Konrad Graber	60,464	27.4	
Swiss People's	Josef Kunz	36,302	16.5	
Social Democrats	Prisca Birrer-Heimo	26,595	12.1	
Greens	Heidi Rebsamen	23,925	10.8	
Swiss People's	Pirmin Müller	8,001	3.6	
Turnout		220,556		
Free Democrats hold		Swing		

2007 Council of States election: Luzern – Second round
Party	Candidate	Votes	%	±%
Christian Democrats	Konrad Graber			
Christian Democrats hold		Swing		

==== Neuchâtel ====
2007 Council of States election: Neuchâtel – First round
Party	Candidate	Votes	%	±%
Social Democrats	Gisèle Ory	17,155	15.3	
Free Democrats	Didier Burkhalter	16,927	15.1	
Social Democrats	Pierre Bonhôte	15,366	13.7	
Swiss People's	Yvan Perrin	15,026	13.4	
Liberals	Sylvie Perrinjaquet	11,811	10.5	
Swiss People's	Jean-Charles Legrix	10,663	9.5	
Labour	Denis de la Reussille	8,351	7.4	
Greens	Francine John-Calame	5,008	4.5	
solidaritéS	Marianne Ebel	4,045	3.6	
Greens	Blaise Horisberger	3,642	3.2	
Christian Democrats	Vincent Martinez	1,926	1.7	
Christian Democrats	Mauro Nanini	1,845	1.7	
Independent	Jäggi Lukas	341	0.3	
Turnout		112,106		

2007 Council of States election: Neuchâtel – Second round
Party	Candidate	Votes	%	±%
Free Democrats	Didier Burkhalter	28,710	35.7	
Social Democrats	Gisèle Ory	27,617	34.4	
Social Democrats	Pierre Bonhôte	24,050	29.9	
Turnout		80,377		
Free Democrats gain from Social Democrats		Swing		
Social Democrats hold		Swing		

==== Nidwalden ====
2007 Council of States election: Nidwalden
Party	Candidate	Votes	%	±%
Christian Democrats	Paul Niederberger			
Turnout				
Christian Democrats hold		Swing		

==== Obwalden ====
2007 Council of States election: Obwalden
Party	Candidate	Votes	%	±%
Free Democrats	Hans Hess			
Turnout				
Free Democrats hold		Swing		

==== Schaffhausen ====
2007 Council of States election: Schaffhausen
Party	Candidate	Votes	%	±%
Free Democrats	Peter Briner	16,831		
Swiss People's	Hannes Germann	16,774		
Greens	Hans Jakob Gloor	6,481		
Social Democrats	Sabine Spross	6,196		
Alternative List	Florian Keller	3,279		
Independent	Vereinzelte	1,655		
Turnout				
Free Democrats hold		Swing		
Swiss People's hold		Swing		

==== Schwyz ====
2007 Council of States election: Schwyz
Party	Candidate	Votes	%	±%
Swiss People's	Alex Kuprecht	22,950		
Christian Democrats	Bruno Frick	21,647		
Christian Democrats	Alois Kessler	13,690		
Free Democrats	Ueli Metzger	11,396		
Social Democrats	Patrick Nauer	5,006		
Independent	Vereinzelte	715		
Turnout				
Swiss People's hold		Swing		
Christian Democrats hold		Swing		

==== Solothurn ====
2007 Council of States election: Solothurn
Party	Candidate	Votes	%	±%
Free Democrats	Rolf Büttiker	50,433		
Social Democrats	Ernst Leuenberger	45,911		
Christian Democrats	Annelies Peduzzi	35,470		
Turnout				
Free Democrats hold		Swing		
Social Democrats hold		Swing		

==== St. Gallen ====
2007 Council of States election: St. Gallen – First round
Party	Candidate	Votes	%	±%
Swiss People's	Toni Brunner	61,648		
Christian Democrats	Eugen David	59,488		
Free Democrats	Erika Forster-Vannini	55,462		
Social Democrats	Kathrin Hilber	43,278		
Greens	Yvonne Gilli	22,824		
Swiss Democrats	Thomas Meinrad Manser	6,280		
Independent	Vereinzelte	2,930		
Turnout				

2007 Council of States election: St. Gallen – Second round
Party	Candidate	Votes	%	±%
Free Democrats	Erika Forster-Vannini	84,547		
Christian Democrats	Eugen David	80,484		
Swiss People's	Toni Brunner	68,667		
Swiss Democrats	Thomas Meinrad Manser	7,940		
Independent	Vereinzelte	946		
Turnout				
Free Democrats hold		Swing		
Christian Democrats hold		Swing		

==== Thurgau ====
2007 Council of States election: Thurgau
Party	Candidate	Votes	%	±%
Christian Democrats	Philipp Stähelin	45,097		
Swiss People's	Hermann Bürgi	44,170		
Greens	Isabella Stäheli-Tobler	14,449		
Social Democrats	Walter Hugentobler	14,176		
Independent	Gabriela Coray	8,845		
Independent	Vereinzelte	2,685		
Turnout				
Christian Democrats hold		Swing		
Swiss People's hold		Swing		

==== Ticino ====
2007 Council of States election: Ticino – First round
Party	Candidate	Votes	%	±%
Free Democrats	Dick Marty	41,428		
Christian Democrats	Filippo Lombardi	33,513		
Social Democrats	Franco Cavalli	33,068		
Ticino League	Attilio Bignasca	21,410		
Swiss People's	Pierre Rusconi	12,144		
Independent	Matteo Gianini	1,878		
Federal Democrats	Edo Pellegrini	1,463		
Independent	Cortonesi Rivo	363		
Turnout				

2007 Council of States election: Ticino – Second round
Party	Candidate	Votes	%	±%
Free Democrats	Dick Marty	40,088		
Christian Democrats	Filippo Lombardi	38,177		
Social Democrats	Franco Cavalli	32,786		
Ticino League	Attilio Bignasca	18,346		
Turnout				
Free Democrats hold		Swing		
Christian Democrats hold		Swing		

==== Uri ====
2007 Council of States election: Uri
Party	Candidate	Votes	%	±%
Christian Democrats	Hansruedi Stadler	5,038		
Christian Democrats	Hansheiri Inderkum	4,937		
Independent	Vereinzelte	697		
Turnout				
Christian Democrats hold		Swing		
Christian Democrats hold		Swing		

==== Valais ====
2007 Council of States election: Valais – First round
Party	Candidate	Votes	%	±%
Christian Democrats	Jean-René Fournier	54,352		
Christian Democrats	René Imoberdorf	45,092		
Free Democrats	Léonard Bender	22,389		
Social Democrats	Peter Jossen-Zinsstag	18,128		
Swiss People's	Jean-Luc Addor	13,274		
Swiss People's	Lukas Jäger	12,257		
Greens	Christophe Clivaz	11,027		
Independent	Michel Carron	1,382		
Independent	Gerlinde Marlene Bass-Bärenfaller	1,334		
Independent	Claude Bourquin	961		
Turnout				
Christian Democrats hold		Swing		

2007 Council of States election: Valais – Second round
Party	Candidate	Votes	%	±%
Christian Democrats	René Imoberdorf			
Turnout				
Christian Democrats hold		Swing		

==== Vaud ====
2007 Council of States election: Vaud – First round
Party	Candidate	Votes	%	±%
Free Democrats	Charles Favre	65,439		
Swiss People's	Guy Parmelin	65,186		
Social Democrats	Géraldine Savary	54,192		
Greens	Luc Recordon	42,998		
Christian Democrats	Jacques Neirynck	17,952		
Labour	Marianne Huguenin	13,795		
Labour	Josef Zisyadis	12,456		
solidaritéS	Jean-Michel Dolivo	5,180		
Federal Democrats	Maximilien Bernhard	3,616		
solidaritéS	Naima Topkiran	2,728		
Independent	Vereinzelte	951		
Turnout				

2007 Council of States election: Vaud – Second round
Party	Candidate	Votes	%	±%
Social Democrats	Géraldine Savary	88,056		
Greens	Luc Recordon	86,350		
Free Democrats	Charles Favre	62,116		
Swiss People's	Guy Parmelin	62,092		
Turnout				
Social Democrats hold		Swing		
Greens gain from Free Democrats		Swing		

==== Zug ====
2007 Council of States election: Zug
Party	Candidate	Votes	%	±%
Christian Democrats	Peter Bieri	21,058		
Free Democrats	Rolf Schweiger	20,195		
Turnout				
Christian Democrats hold		Swing		
Free Democrats hold		Swing		

==== Zurich ====
2007 Council of States election: Zurich – First round
Party	Candidate	Votes	%	±%
Free Democrats	Felix Gutzwiller	182,594		
Swiss People's	Ueli Maurer	150,707		
Social Democrats	Chantal Galladé	110,843		
Green Liberals	Verena Diener	100,442		
Greens	Daniel Vischer	61,354		
Independent	Vereinzelte	48,148		
Christian Democrats	Kathy Riklin	39,715		
Evangelical People's	Ruedi Aeschbacher	16,237		
Federal Democrats	Markus Wäfler	8,011		
Alternative List	Niklaus Scherr	7,878		
Independent	Stadelmann Toni	1,327		
Independent	Zaehner Heinz	350		
Independent	Danowski Marian	142		
Turnout				
Free Democrats hold		Swing		

2007 Council of States election: Zurich – Second round
Party	Candidate	Votes	%	±%
Green Liberals	Verena Diener	199,594		
Swiss People's	Ueli Maurer	170,081		
Independent	Vereinzelte	8,230		
Turnout		377,905		
Green Liberals gain from Swiss People's		Swing		
