= List of members of the Federal Assembly from the Canton of Appenzell Ausserrhoden =

Coat of Arms

This is a list of members of both houses of the Federal Assembly from the Canton of Appenzell Ausserrhoden. As one of the cantons defined until 1999 as "half-cantons", Appenzell Ausserrhoden elects only one member to the Council of States

== Members of the Council of States ==
Election	Councillor (Party)
Appointed	Johann Konrad Oertli; Free Democratic Party; 1848–1849
Appointed	Johann Jakob; Free Democratic Party; 1849–1849
Appointed	Johannes Roth; Free Democratic Party; 1849–1859
Appointed	Johann Jakob Sutter; Free Democratic Party; 1859–1866
Appointed	Johannes Hohl; Free Democratic Party; 1866–1868
Appointed	Johannes Roth; Free Democratic Party; 1868–1871
Appointed	Arnold Roth; Party unknown 1871–1877
Appointed	Johann Jakob Hohl; Free Democratic Party; 1877–1911
Appointed	Johannes Baumann; Free Democratic Party; 1911–1934
Appointed	Hans-Konrad Sonderegger; Independent; 1934–1935
1935	Walter Ackermann; Free Democratic Party; 1935–1963
1939	Walter Ackermann; Free Democratic Party; 1935–1963
1943	Walter Ackermann; Free Democratic Party; 1935–1963
1947	Walter Ackermann; Free Democratic Party; 1935–1963
1951	Walter Ackermann; Free Democratic Party; 1935–1963
1955	Walter Ackermann; Free Democratic Party; 1935–1963
1959	Walter Ackermann; Free Democratic Party; 1935–1963
1963	Hans Nänny; Free Democratic Party; 1963–1975
1967	Hans Nänny; Free Democratic Party; 1963–1975
1971	Hans Nänny; Free Democratic Party; 1963–1975
1975	Hans Ulrich Baumberger; Free Democratic Party; 1975–1983
1979	Hans Ulrich Baumberger; Free Democratic Party; 1975–1983
1983	Otto Schoch; Free Democratic Party; 1983–1997
1987	Otto Schoch; Free Democratic Party; 1983–1997
1991	Otto Schoch; Free Democratic Party; 1983–1997
1995	Otto Schoch; Free Democratic Party; 1983–1997
1997	Hans-Rudolf Merz; Free Democratic Party; 1997–2003
1999	Hans-Rudolf Merz; Free Democratic Party; 1997–2003
2003	Hans-Rudolf Merz; Free Democratic Party; 1997–2003
2004	Hans Altherr; Free Democratic Party; 2004–2009; FDP.The Liberals; 2009-2019
2007	Hans Altherr; Free Democratic Party; 2004–2009; FDP.The Liberals; 2009-2019
2009	Hans Altherr; Free Democratic Party; 2004–2009; FDP.The Liberals; 2009-2019
2011	Hans Altherr; Free Democratic Party; 2004–2009; FDP.The Liberals; 2009-2019
2015	Hans Altherr; Free Democratic Party; 2004–2009; FDP.The Liberals; 2009-2019
2019	Andrea Caroni; FDP.The Liberals; 2019–present
2023	Andrea Caroni; FDP.The Liberals; 2019–present

== Members of the National Council ==
Election	Councillor (Party)	Councillor (Party)	Councillor (Party)
1848	Johann Heinrich Heim (Seele der Bewegung)	Johann Jakob Sutter (FDP/PRD)	2 seats 1848–1881
1851	Johann Heinrich Tanner (Liberal)	Johann Jakob Sutter (FDP/PRD)	2 seats 1848–1881
1853	Jakob Kellenberger (Ind)	Johann Konrad Oertli (FDP/PRD)	2 seats 1848–1881
1854	Jakob Kellenberger (Ind)	Titus Tobler (Ind)	2 seats 1848–1881
1857	Johann Konrad Oertli (FDP/PRD)	Adolf Friedrich Zürcher (Liberal)	2 seats 1848–1881
1859	Johannes Roth (FDP/PRD)	Adolf Friedrich Zürcher (Liberal)	2 seats 1848–1881
1860	Johannes Roth (FDP/PRD)	Adolf Friedrich Zürcher (Liberal)	2 seats 1848–1881
1863	Johannes Roth (FDP/PRD)	Adolf Friedrich Zürcher (Liberal)	2 seats 1848–1881
1866	Johann Ulrich Meyer (FDP/PRD)	Adolf Friedrich Zürcher (Liberal)	2 seats 1848–1881
1868	Johann Ulrich Sutter (Liberal)	Adolf Friedrich Zürcher (Liberal)	2 seats 1848–1881
1869	Johannes Hohl (FDP/PRD)	Adolf Friedrich Zürcher (Liberal)	2 seats 1848–1881
1872	Johannes Hohl (FDP/PRD)	Adolf Friedrich Zürcher (Liberal)	2 seats 1848–1881
1873	Christian Graf (FDP/PRD)	Adolf Friedrich Zürcher (Liberal)	2 seats 1848–1881
1875	Christian Graf (FDP/PRD)	Johann Georg Tanner (FDP/PRD)	2 seats 1848–1881
1878	Johann Fässler (FDP/PRD)	Daniel Hofstetter (Liberal)	2 seats 1848–1881
1881	Johann Conrad Sonderegger (FDP/PRD)	Daniel Hofstetter (Liberal)	Johann Ulrich Schiess (Liberal)
1883	Johann Conrad Sonderegger (FDP/PRD)	Johann Jakob Sturzenegger (Liberal)	Johann Ulrich Eisenhut (Liberal)
1884	Johann Conrad Sonderegger (FDP/PRD)	Johann Jakob Sturzenegger (Liberal)	Johann Ulrich Eisenhut (Liberal)
1887	Johann Conrad Sonderegger (FDP/PRD)	Johann Jakob Sturzenegger (Liberal)	Johann Ulrich Eisenhut (Liberal)
1890	Johann Conrad Sonderegger (FDP/PRD)	Johann Jakob Sturzenegger (Liberal)	Johannes Zuberbühler (FDP/PRD)
1893	Johann Conrad Sonderegger (FDP/PRD)	Joh. Konrad Eisenhut (FDP/PRD)	Johannes Zuberbühler (FDP/PRD)
1896	Johann Conrad Sonderegger (FDP/PRD)	Joh. Konrad Eisenhut (FDP/PRD)	Johann Jakob Sonderegger (FDP/PRD)
1899	Jakob Konrad Lutz (FDP/PRD)	Joh. Konrad Eisenhut (FDP/PRD)	Johann Jakob Sonderegger (FDP/PRD)
1902	Arthur Eugster (FDP/PRD)	Joh. Konrad Eisenhut (FDP/PRD)	Johann Jakob Sonderegger (FDP/PRD)
1905	Arthur Eugster (FDP/PRD)	Joh. Konrad Eisenhut (FDP/PRD)	Hermann Altherr (FDP/PRD)
1908	Arthur Eugster (FDP/PRD)	Howard Eugster (SP/PS)	Hermann Altherr (FDP/PRD)
1911	Arthur Eugster (FDP/PRD)	Howard Eugster (SP/PS)	Johannes Eisenhut (FDP/PRD)
1914	Arthur Eugster (FDP/PRD)	Howard Eugster (SP/PS)	Johannes Eisenhut (FDP/PRD)
1917	Arthur Eugster (FDP/PRD)	Howard Eugster (SP/PS)	Johannes Eisenhut (FDP/PRD)
1919	Arthur Eugster (FDP/PRD)	Howard Eugster (SP/PS)	Johannes Eisenhut (FDP/PRD)
1921	Alfred Hofstetter (FDP/PRD)	Howard Eugster (SP/PS)	Johannes Eisenhut (FDP/PRD)
1922	Alfred Hofstetter (FDP/PRD)	Howard Eugster (SP/PS)	Johannes Eisenhut (FDP/PRD)
1925	Alfred Hofstetter (FDP/PRD)	Howard Eugster (SP/PS)	Johannes Eisenhut (FDP/PRD)
1928	Alfred Hofstetter (FDP/PRD)	Howard Eugster (SP/PS)	Johannes Eisenhut (FDP/PRD)
1931	Gustav Altherr (FDP/PRD)	Howard Eugster (SP/PS)	2 seats 1931–2003
1932	Gustav Altherr (FDP/PRD)	Peter Flisch (SP/PS)	2 seats 1931–2003
1935	Albert Keller (FDP/PRD)	Peter Flisch (SP/PS)	2 seats 1931–2003
1939	Albert Keller (FDP/PRD)	Peter Flisch (SP/PS)	2 seats 1931–2003
1943	Albert Keller (FDP/PRD)	Peter Flisch (SP/PS)	2 seats 1931–2003
1947	Albert Keller (FDP/PRD)	Peter Flisch (SP/PS)	2 seats 1931–2003
1951	Jakob Bruderer (FDP/PRD)	Peter Flisch (SP/PS)	2 seats 1931–2003
1955	Jakob Langenauer (FDP/PRD)	Erwin Schwendinger (SP/PS)	2 seats 1931–2003
1959	Jakob Langenauer (FDP/PRD)	Erwin Schwendinger (SP/PS)	2 seats 1931–2003
1963	Jakob Langenauer (FDP/PRD)	Erwin Schwendinger (SP/PS)	2 seats 1931–2003
1967	Jakob Langenauer (FDP/PRD)	Erwin Schwendinger (SP/PS)	2 seats 1931–2003
1971	Hans Ulrich Baumberger (FDP/PRD)	Erwin Schwendinger (SP/PS)	2 seats 1931–2003
1974	Hans Ulrich Baumberger (FDP/PRD)	Christian Merz (SP/PS)	2 seats 1931–2003
1975	Hans-Rudolf Früh (FDP/PRD)	Christian Merz (SP/PS)	2 seats 1931–2003
1979	Hans-Rudolf Früh (FDP/PRD)	Christian Merz (SP/PS)	2 seats 1931–2003
1983	Hans-Rudolf Früh (FDP/PRD)	Herbert Maeder (LDU/LdI)	2 seats 1931–2003
1987	Hans-Rudolf Früh (FDP/PRD)	Herbert Maeder (LDU/LdI)	2 seats 1931–2003
1991	Hans-Rudolf Früh (FDP/PRD)	Herbert Maeder (LDU/LdI)	2 seats 1931–2003
1995	Dorle Vallender (FDP/PRD)	Jakob Freund (SVP/UDC)	2 seats 1931–2003
1999	Dorle Vallender (FDP/PRD)	Jakob Freund (SVP/UDC)	2 seats 1931–2003
2003	Marianne Kleiner (FDP/PRD / FDP.The Liberals)	1 seat 2003-present	
2007	Marianne Kleiner (FDP/PRD / FDP.The Liberals)	1 seat 2003-present	
2009	Marianne Kleiner (FDP/PRD / FDP.The Liberals)	1 seat 2003-present	
2011	Andrea Caroni (FDP.The Liberals)	1 seat 2003-present	
2015	David Zuberbühler (SVP/UDC)	1 seat 2003-present	
2019	David Zuberbühler (SVP/UDC)	1 seat 2003-present	
2023	David Zuberbühler (SVP/UDC)	1 seat 2003-present	
