= 1995 Swiss federal election =

← 1991	22 October 1995	1999 →
- Turnout: 42.22% (▼3.83pp)
- National Council
- All 200 seats in the National Council; 101 seats needed for a majority
Party	Leader	Vote %	Seats	+/–
Social Democrats	Peter Bodenmann	21.79	54	+13
Free Democrats	Franz Steinegger	20.18	45	+1
Christian Democrats	Anton Cottier	16.79	34	−1
Swiss People's	Hans Uhlmann	14.90	29	+4
Greens	Hanspeter Thür	5.04	8	−6
Freedom	Roland Borer	3.97	7	−1
Swiss Democrats	Rudolf Keller	3.13	3	−2
Liberals	François Jeanneret	2.69	7	−3
LdU	Monika Weber	1.83	3	−2
Evangelical People's	Otto Zwygart	1.79	2	−1
Feminist & Greens		1.47	2	+1
Federal Democrats	Christian Waber	1.30	1	0
Labour		1.20	3	+1
Ticino League	Giuliano Bignasca	0.94	1	−1
Christian Social		0.30	1	0
This lists parties that won seats. See the complete results below.
- Council of States
- All 46 seats in the Council of States; 24 seats needed for a majority
Party	Seats	+/–
Free Democrats	17	−1
Christian Democrats	16	0
Swiss People's	5	+1
Social Democrats	5	+2
Liberals	2	−1
LdU	1	0
This lists parties that won seats. See the complete results below.
Results by canton

Federal elections were held in Switzerland on October 22, 1995. The Social Democratic Party emerged as the largest party in the National Council, winning 54 of the 200 seats. As of 2024, it is the last time the Swiss People's Party did not receive the most votes.

== Results ==
=== National Council ===
Party	Votes	%	Seats	+/–
Social Democratic Party	415,226	21.79	54	+13
Free Democratic Party	384,515	20.18	45	+1
Christian Democratic People's Party	319,972	16.79	34	–1
Swiss People's Party	283,902	14.90	29	+4
Green Party	96,069	5.04	8	–6
Freedom Party	75,641	3.97	7	–1
Swiss Democrats	59,613	3.13	3	–2
Liberal Party	51,182	2.69	7	–3
Alliance of Independents	34,801	1.83	3	–2
Evangelical People's Party	34,071	1.79	2	–1
Feminist and Green Alternative Groups	28,076	1.47	2	+1
Federal Democratic Union	24,795	1.30	1	0
Swiss Party of Labour	22,850	1.20	3	+1
Ticino League	17,940	0.94	1	–1
Solidarity	6,168	0.32	0	New
Independent Social-Christian Party	5,625	0.30	1	0
Other parties	44,878	2.36	0	–
Total	1,905,324	100.00	200	0
Valid votes	1,905,324	98.18		
Invalid/blank votes	35,298	1.82		
Total votes	1,940,622	100.00		
Registered voters/turnout	4,596,209	42.22		
Source: Nohlen & Stöver

==== By constituency ====
Constituency	Seats	Electorate	Turnout	Party	Votes	Seats won
Aargau	15	342,331	144,183	Swiss People's Party	416,584	3
Aargau	15	342,331	144,183	Social Democratic Party	408,491	3
Aargau	15	342,331	144,183	Free Democratic Party	332,189	3
Aargau	15	342,331	144,183	Christian Democratic People's Party	297,955	2
Aargau	15	342,331	144,183	Freedom Party	236,929	2
Aargau	15	342,331	144,183	Green Party	112,351	1
Aargau	15	342,331	144,183	Swiss Democrats	93,690	0
Aargau	15	342,331	144,183	Ring of Independents	69,321	1
Aargau	15	342,331	144,183	Evangelical People's Party	64,030	0
Aargau	15	342,331	144,183	Federal Democratic Union	28,016	0
Aargau	15	342,331	144,183	FrauenPolitik	20,293	0
Aargau	15	342,331	144,183	Catholic People's Party	14,643	0
Aargau	15	342,331	144,183	Kurt Bornhauser	4,567	0
Aargau	15	342,331	144,183	Non-Partisan Forum	3,009	0
Appenzell Ausserrhoden	2	35,511	17,303	Free Democratic Party	12,401	1
Appenzell Ausserrhoden	2	35,511	17,303	Swiss People's Party	7,494	1
Appenzell Ausserrhoden	2	35,511	17,303	Social Democratic Party	7,461	0
Appenzell Ausserrhoden	2	35,511	17,303	Christian Democratic People's Party	3,240	0
Appenzell Ausserrhoden	2	35,511	17,303	Freedom Party	3,032	0
Appenzell Ausserrhoden	2	35,511	17,303	Non-Partisan	405	0
Appenzell Innerrhoden	1	9,888	1,716	Christian Democratic People's Party	1,346	1
Appenzell Innerrhoden	1	9,888	1,716	Others	230	0
Basel-Landschaft	7	172,915	71,412	Social Democratic Party	124,385	2
Basel-Landschaft	7	172,915	71,412	Free Democratic Party	96,442	1
Basel-Landschaft	7	172,915	71,412	Christian Democratic People's Party	57,615	1
Basel-Landschaft	7	172,915	71,412	Swiss Democrats	53,823	1
Basel-Landschaft	7	172,915	71,412	Swiss People's Party	53,177	1
Basel-Landschaft	7	172,915	71,412	Green Party	46,766	1
Basel-Landschaft	7	172,915	71,412	Free Citizens' List	31,418	0
Basel-Landschaft	7	172,915	71,412	Federal Democratic Union	9,275	0
Basel-Landschaft	7	172,915	71,412	Evangelical People's Party	8,455	0
Basel-Landschaft	7	172,915	71,412	Freedom Party	6,467	0
Basel-Landschaft	7	172,915	71,412	Ring of Independents	6,402	0
Basel-Landschaft	7	172,915	71,412	Natural Law Party	1,873	0
Basel-Landschaft	7	172,915	71,412	Swiss Freedom Party	1,705	0
Basel-Stadt	6	129,279	60,500	Social Democratic Party	125,965	4
Basel-Stadt	6	129,279	60,500	Liberal Party	52,707	1
Basel-Stadt	6	129,279	60,500	Free Democratic Party	43,108	1
Basel-Stadt	6	129,279	60,500	Christian Democratic People's Party	34,387	0
Basel-Stadt	6	129,279	60,500	Swiss Democrats	24,453	0
Basel-Stadt	6	129,279	60,500	Green Party	19,782	0
Basel-Stadt	6	129,279	60,500	Evangelical People's Party	14,657	0
Basel-Stadt	6	129,279	60,500	Basel's Strong Alternative	11,344	0
Basel-Stadt	6	129,279	60,500	Women's List	9,962	0
Basel-Stadt	6	129,279	60,500	Freedom Party	8,835	0
Basel-Stadt	6	129,279	60,500	Party of Labour	4,706	0
Basel-Stadt	6	129,279	60,500	Solidarity	2,309	0
Basel-Stadt	6	129,279	60,500	Natural Law Party	1,214	0
Basel-Stadt	6	129,279	60,500	Gray Panther	1,151	0
Bern	27	676,293	273,451	Swiss People's Party	1,873,155	8
Bern	27	676,293	273,451	Social Democratic Party	1,779,142	8
Bern	27	676,293	273,451	Free Democratic Party	1,127,035	4
Bern	27	676,293	273,451	Green Party	599,878	2
Bern	27	676,293	273,451	Freedom Party	421,925	1
Bern	27	676,293	273,451	Swiss Democrats	392,735	1
Bern	27	676,293	273,451	Federal Democratic Union	300,218	1
Bern	27	676,293	273,451	Evangelical People's Party	270,781	1
Bern	27	676,293	273,451	Ring of Independents	139,538	0
Bern	27	676,293	273,451	Christian Democratic People's Party	112,048	1
Bern	27	676,293	273,451	Jurassic Alliance	104,970	0
Bern	27	676,293	273,451	Liberal Party	22,637	0
Bern	27	676,293	273,451	Independent Social-Christian Party	21,303	0
Bern	27	676,293	273,451	Workers and Pensioners' Party	18,170	0
Bern	27	676,293	273,451	Natural Law Party	10,399	0
Bern	27	676,293	273,451	Generation 2001	9,025	0
Fribourg	6	151,395	59,778	Christian Democratic People's Party	123,968	3
Fribourg	6	151,395	59,778	Social Democratic Party	59,619	1
Fribourg	6	151,395	59,778	Free Democratic Party	54,850	1
Fribourg	6	151,395	59,778	Independent Social-Christian Party	30,069	1
Fribourg	6	151,395	59,778	Swiss People's Party	28,735	1
Fribourg	6	151,395	59,778	Independence - Equality - Solidarity	15,961	0
Fribourg	6	151,395	59,778	Democratic Social Party	11,107	0
Fribourg	6	151,395	59,778	Green Party	8,025	0
Fribourg	6	151,395	59,778	Time Bomb Politics	3,428	0
Fribourg	6	151,395	59,778	Party of Labour	3,156	0
Fribourg	6	151,395	59,778	Swiss Democrats	3,035	0
Fribourg	6	151,395	59,778	Swiss Europe Renaissance	2,103	0
Fribourg	6	151,395	59,778	Natural Law Party	633	0
Geneva	11	206,078	73,435	Social Democratic Party	233,287	4
Geneva	11	206,078	73,435	Liberal Party	138,219	2
Geneva	11	206,078	73,435	Free Democratic Party	105,053	2
Geneva	11	206,078	73,435	Christian Democratic People's Party	104,056	1
Geneva	11	206,078	73,435	Party of Labour	73,476	2
Geneva	11	206,078	73,435	Green Party	43,598	0
Geneva	11	206,078	73,435	Solidarity	29,468	0
Geneva	11	206,078	73,435	Swiss Democrats	18,919	0
Geneva	11	206,078	73,435	Let's Stay Swiss and Free!	17,423	0
Geneva	11	206,078	73,435	Unity Against Social Dismantlement	5,941	0
Geneva	11	206,078	73,435	Party Against Unfair Machinations	5,035	0
Geneva	11	206,078	73,435	Ex-Yugoslavia: Acting Against The Unsustainable	4,130	0
Glarus	1	24,786	6,072	Social Democratic Party	4,498	1
Glarus	1	24,786	6,072	Others	863	0
Grisons	5	124,493	45,782	Swiss People's Party	59,119	1
Grisons	5	124,493	45,782	Christian Democratic People's Party	58,892	1
Grisons	5	124,493	45,782	Social Democratic Party	47,457	2
Grisons	5	124,493	45,782	Free Democratic Party	36,202	1
Grisons	5	124,493	45,782	Green Party	7,581	0
Grisons	5	124,493	45,782	Independent Women	4,112	0
Grisons	5	124,493	45,782	Youth '91	2,712	0
Grisons	5	124,493	45,782	Ring of Independents	2,331	0
Grisons	5	124,493	45,782	Gray Panther	522	0
Grisons	5	124,493	45,782	Natural Law Party	488	0
Jura	2	47,625	20,256	Christian Democratic People's Party	15,041	1
Jura	2	47,625	20,256	Social Democratic Party	12,745	1
Jura	2	47,625	20,256	Free Democratic Party	11,608	0
Lucerne	10	227,940	112,654	Christian Democratic People's Party	408,725	4
Lucerne	10	227,940	112,654	Free Democratic Party	279,132	3
Lucerne	10	227,940	112,654	Swiss People's Party	154,384	1
Lucerne	10	227,940	112,654	Social Democratic Party	127,888	1
Lucerne	10	227,940	112,654	Green Party	88,183	1
Lucerne	10	227,940	112,654	Swiss Democrats	24,194	0
Lucerne	10	227,940	112,654	Independent Women's List	8,931	0
Lucerne	10	227,940	112,654	Clarity, Logic and Environmental Awareness	2,001	0
Lucerne	10	227,940	112,654	Gray Panther	1,907	0
Neuchâtel	5	104,273	33,293	Social Democratic Party	44,640	2
Neuchâtel	5	104,273	33,293	Free Democratic Party	40,714	2
Neuchâtel	5	104,273	33,293	Liberal Party	39,880	1
Neuchâtel	5	104,273	33,293	Party of Labour	11,290	0
Neuchâtel	5	104,273	33,293	Green Party	9,313	0
Neuchâtel	5	104,273	33,293	Swiss Democrats	4,017	0
Neuchâtel	5	104,273	33,293	Federal Democratic Union	3,638	0
Neuchâtel	5	104,273	33,293	Unity Against Social Dismantlement	2,646	0
Neuchâtel	5	104,273	33,293	Swiss Europe Renaissance	1,963	0
Neuchâtel	5	104,273	33,293	Natural Law Party	465	0
Nidwalden	1	25,496	15,022	Free Democratic Party	7,081	1
Nidwalden	1	25,496	15,022	Christian Democratic People's Party	4,724	0
Nidwalden	1	25,496	15,022	Democratic Nidwalden	2,819	0
Nidwalden	1	25,496	15,022	Natural Law Party	58	0
Nidwalden	1	25,496	15,022	Others	36	0
Obwalden	1	21,350	6,800	Christian Democratic People's Party	6,118	1
Obwalden	1	21,350	6,800	Freedom Party	244	0
Obwalden	1	21,350	6,800	Others	136	0
Schaffhausen	2	48,702	31,349	Social Democratic Party	22,620	1
Schaffhausen	2	48,702	31,349	Free Democratic Party	19,061	1
Schaffhausen	2	48,702	31,349	Swiss People's Party	12,190	0
Schaffhausen	2	48,702	31,349	Freedom Party	5,130	0
Schaffhausen	2	48,702	31,349	Natural Law Party	820	0
Schwyz	3	80,097	28,089	Christian Democratic People's Party	22,208	1
Schwyz	3	80,097	28,089	Free Democratic Party	19,486	1
Schwyz	3	80,097	28,089	Swiss People's Party	17,432	1
Schwyz	3	80,097	28,089	Social Democratic Party	16,160	0
Schwyz	3	80,097	28,089	Swiss Democrats	2,516	0
Schwyz	3	80,097	28,089	Freedom Party	2,299	0
Schwyz	3	80,097	28,089	Natural Law Party	723	0
Schwyz	3	80,097	28,089	Gray Panther	369	0
Solothurn	7	162,618	78,471	Free Democratic Party	136,936	2
Solothurn	7	162,618	78,471	Social Democratic Party	130,378	2
Solothurn	7	162,618	78,471	Christian Democratic People's Party	115,744	2
Solothurn	7	162,618	78,471	Freedom Party	56,898	1
Solothurn	7	162,618	78,471	Swiss People's Party	36,040	0
Solothurn	7	162,618	78,471	Green Party	31,477	0
Solothurn	7	162,618	78,471	Swiss Democrats	14,941	0
Solothurn	7	162,618	78,471	Ring of Independents	8,806	0
Solothurn	7	162,618	78,471	Free List of Non-Partisans	5,839	0
Solothurn	7	162,618	78,471	Natural Law Party	1,036	0
St. Gallen	12	280,839	115,214	Christian Democratic People's Party	417,191	4
St. Gallen	12	280,839	115,214	Free Democratic Party	254,476	2
St. Gallen	12	280,839	115,214	Social Democratic Party	218,130	3
St. Gallen	12	280,839	115,214	Freedom Party	137,691	1
St. Gallen	12	280,839	115,214	Swiss People's Party	113,683	1
St. Gallen	12	280,839	115,214	Green Party	65,903	1
St. Gallen	12	280,839	115,214	Ring of Independents	55,309	0
St. Gallen	12	280,839	115,214	Swiss Democrats	27,173	0
St. Gallen	12	280,839	115,214	Evangelical People's Party	22,840	0
St. Gallen	12	280,839	115,214	Federal Democratic Union	13,960	0
St. Gallen	12	280,839	115,214	Zum Glück gits üs	13,297	0
St. Gallen	12	280,839	115,214	Think with Heart and Mind	1,930	0
St. Gallen	12	280,839	115,214	St. Gallen Craft	1,868	0
St. Gallen	12	280,839	115,214	Natural Law Party	1,739	0
St. Gallen	12	280,839	115,214	Gray Panther	1,490	0
Ticino	8	189,625	99,681	Free Democratic Party	233,392	3
Ticino	8	189,625	99,681	Christian Democratic People's Party	217,217	2
Ticino	8	189,625	99,681	Ticino League	142,441	1
Ticino	8	189,625	99,681	Social Democratic Party	130,672	2
Ticino	8	189,625	99,681	Green Party	13,254	0
Ticino	8	189,625	99,681	Swiss People's Party	11,358	0
Ticino	8	189,625	99,681	Party of Labour	10,277	0
Ticino	8	189,625	99,681	Pole of Liberty	7,287	0
Thurgau	6	137,602	60,624	Swiss People's Party	96,708	2
Thurgau	6	137,602	60,624	Social Democratic Party	64,738	1
Thurgau	6	137,602	60,624	Free Democratic Party	54,729	1
Thurgau	6	137,602	60,624	Christian Democratic People's Party	46,424	1
Thurgau	6	137,602	60,624	Green Party	33,146	0
Thurgau	6	137,602	60,624	Freedom Party	28,532	1
Thurgau	6	137,602	60,624	Swiss Democrats	17,067	0
Thurgau	6	137,602	60,624	Evangelical People's Party	9,580	0
Thurgau	6	137,602	60,624	Catholic People's Party	5,052	0
Thurgau	6	137,602	60,624	Rustic People's Party	1,881	0
Uri	1	25,381	10,081	Free Democratic Party	7,550	1
Uri	1	25,381	10,081	Natural Law Party	265	0
Uri	1	25,381	10,081	Others	962	0
Vaud	17	362,897	119,186	Free Democratic Party	450,305	5
Vaud	17	362,897	119,186	Social Democratic Party	436,391	5
Vaud	17	362,897	119,186	Liberal Party	281,870	3
Vaud	17	362,897	119,186	Party of Labour	171,533	1
Vaud	17	362,897	119,186	Swiss People's Party	148,684	1
Vaud	17	362,897	119,186	Green Party	127,235	1
Vaud	17	362,897	119,186	Christian Democratic People's Party	108,461	0
Vaud	17	362,897	119,186	Federal Democratic Union	52,359	0
Vaud	17	362,897	119,186	Swiss Democrats	34,911	0
Vaud	17	362,897	119,186	Solidarity	50,479	0
Vaud	17	362,897	119,186	Swiss Europe Renaissance	41,595	0
Vaud	17	362,897	119,186	Unity Against Social Dismantlement	9,403	0
Vaud	17	362,897	119,186	Movement for A Lively Switzerland	4,162	0
Vaud	17	362,897	119,186	Natural Law Party	3,810	0
Valais	7	177,102	97,311	Christian Democratic People's Party	351,978	4
Valais	7	177,102	97,311	Free Democratic Party	154,763	2
Valais	7	177,102	97,311	Social Democratic Party	106,518	1
Valais	7	177,102	97,311	Liberal Party	14,259	0
Valais	7	177,102	97,311	Green Party	8,419	0
Valais	7	177,102	97,311	Party of Labour	5,458	0
Zug	3	60,447	26,850	Christian Democratic People's Party	21,587	1
Zug	3	60,447	26,850	Free Democratic Party	17,935	1
Zug	3	60,447	26,850	Social Democratic Party	13,523	1
Zug	3	60,447	26,850	Swiss People's Party	12,072	0
Zug	3	60,447	26,850	Bunte List	3,867	0
Zug	3	60,447	26,850	Basic Democracy	1,577	0
Zug	3	60,447	26,850	Liberal Alternative	776	0
Zürich	34	768,809	332,133	Swiss People's Party	2,823,623	9
Zürich	34	768,809	332,133	Social Democratic Party	2,559,235	9
Zürich	34	768,809	332,133	Free Democratic Party	2,007,068	6
Zürich	34	768,809	332,133	Green Party	723,603	2
Zürich	34	768,809	332,133	Ring of Independents	589,346	2
Zürich	34	768,809	332,133	Christian Democratic People's Party	540,385	2
Zürich	34	768,809	332,133	Evangelical People's Party	414,962	1
Zürich	34	768,809	332,133	Freedom Party	392,693	1
Zürich	34	768,809	332,133	Swiss Democrats	365,336	1
Zürich	34	768,809	332,133	Frauen macht Politik!	302,116	1
Zürich	34	768,809	332,133	Federal Democratic Union	206,746	0
Zürich	34	768,809	332,133	Liberal Party	52,179	0
Zürich	34	768,809	332,133	Senior Citizens	31,952	0
Zürich	34	768,809	332,133	Europe Party	29,043	0
Zürich	34	768,809	332,133	Independent Social-Christian Party	17,739	0
Zürich	34	768,809	332,133	Natural Law Party	14,874	0
Zürich	34	768,809	332,133	Non-Partisan Movement	14,336	0
Zürich	34	768,809	332,133	Gray Panther	5,750	0
Source: Bundesblatt, 12 December 1995

=== Council of the States ===
Party	Seats	+/–
Free Democratic Party	17	–1
Christian Democratic People's Party	16	0
Swiss People's Party	5	+1
Social Democratic Party	5	+2
Liberal Party	2	–1
Alliance of Independents	1	0
Total	46	0
Source: Nohlen & Stöver
