= Giuliano Bignasca =

Swiss politician

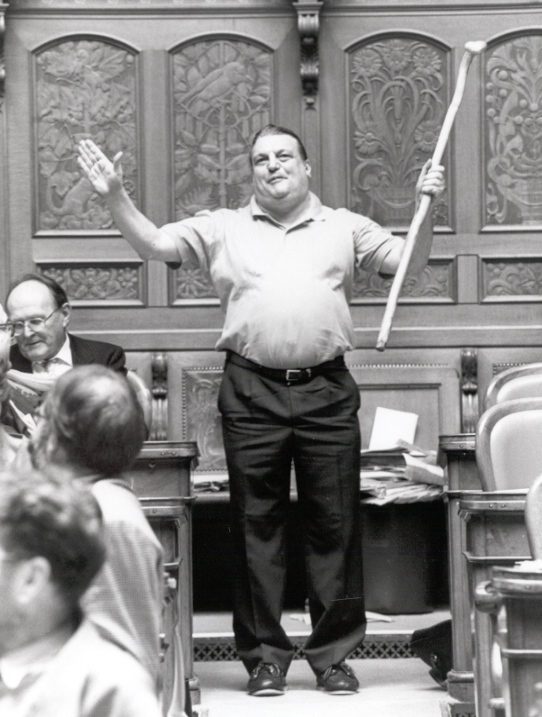
- Born: Giuliano Bignasca; April 10, 1945; Lugano, Switzerland
- Died: 7 March 2013 (aged 67); Canobbio, Switzerland
- Occupation: politician
- Height: 1.66 m (5 ft 5 in)

Giuliano Bignasca (10 April 1945 – 7 March 2013) was a Swiss politician, who was a co-founder of the Ticino League.

== Early life and family ==
Bignasca was born in Lugano in May 1945, and grew up in the Sonvico quarter. In 1963, Bignasca played for the youth team at FC Lugano. After his schooling, he began technical training as a construction engineer. His father was a marble dealer and owner of an engraving company in Lugano. Along with his brother Attilio, they took it over and expanded it into construction.

Giuliano Bignasca died on 7 March 2013, at his home in Canobbio. He had one son.

== Political career ==
In 1989, he met Flavio Maspoli through their common party affiliation with the Free Democratic Party of Switzerland. Together they launched a free newspaper funded at first by Bignasca, Il Mattino, which would later become the party newspaper of the Ticino League. Increasingly disappointed by the FDP, in 1991 Bignasca and Maspoli founded the protest party Ticino League (Lega dei Ticinesi). In 1995 and from 1999 to 2003, he was a member of the National Council, the lower house of parliament. In 1995, he managed to enter the National Council in a by-election but failed to be reelected later the same year. Once reelected to the National Council in the 1999 and 2003 elections, he stayed away from numerous meetings of the parliament and committees. From 2000 until his death, he worked in the government of the city of Lugano in the areas of public works, youth services, and leisure.

The tabloid press said that Bignasca had made himself President for Life of the Ticino League. He was called Il nano ("the dwarf"), because of his size, which many Ticinese alleged was the result of cocaine abuse and the public attention his reputed dubious business dealings got. The insults lessened as the Ticino League grew, into the second largest party in Ticino.

Bignasca had several defamation lawsuits that were filed against him, because he criticized unpopular politicians and officials in the party newspaper. Bignasca was regarded as unique in the political landscape, because he spoke to all using informal pronouns, and wore suits, but almost never a tie. His somewhat long hair, once tied in a ponytail, became a trademark. Admirers and opponents both called him the "political clown" but ascribed a strong political instinct to him.

On 26 July 1991, Bignasca made a "freedom caravan", by strolling along the A2 motorway with his followers, as a protest against speed limits on highways. He caused a major traffic jam, and as a consequence spent a 24-day semi-imprisonment sentence in June 1994.

In June 2003 he was referred to the bureau of the National Council, after he had said in an election broadcast: "They should lock all environmentalists into a phone booth and then extinguish them, as the Serbian premier Zoran Djindjic". Bignasca immediately apologized.

In 2006, Bignasca was fined because he wrote in his party newspaper urging readers to dismantle police fixed radars and promised a reward for each radar removed. As a celebration of electoral success in 2007, he shot salvos from his SG 90 assault rifle while on the terrace of his office. During criminal proceedings, he responded by saying he only fired blanks. He was punished with a fine of 50 francs for public disturbance. In 2007 he was founded to have violated Article 261, the Swiss anti-racism law. He had written in his party newspaper, that the winning Swiss national football team had too many dark-skinned players.

Giuliano Bignasca died on 7 March 2013 at the age of 67.
