= Attilio Bignasca =

Swiss politician (1943–2020)

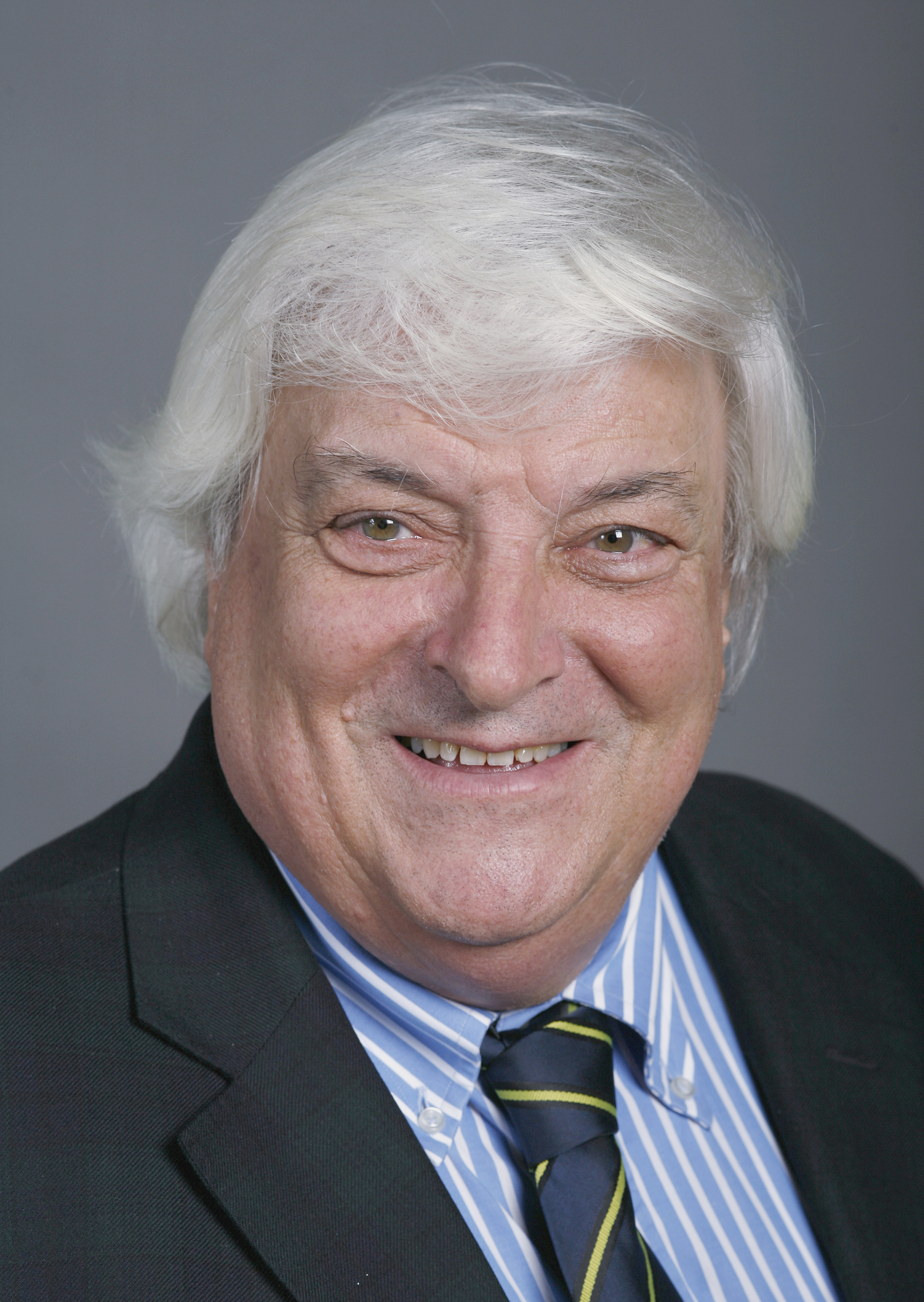
- Bignasca in 2007

Deputy of the Canton of Ticino
- In office April 1991 – October 2016

National Councillor
- In office 1 December 2003 – 31 December 2009
- Succeeded by: Norman Gobbi

Coordinator of the Ticino League
- In office 7 March 2013 – 31 May 2017
- Preceded by: Giuliano Bignasca

Deputy of the Canton of Ticino
- In office April 2019 – December 2019

Personal details
- Born: 1 November 1943 Viganello, Switzerland
- Died: 29 March 2020 (aged 76) Lugano, Switzerland
- Party: Ticino League
- Occupation: Politician

Attilio Bignasca (1 November 1943 – 29 March 2020) was a Swiss politician and a member of the Ticino League. He was the brother of Giuliano Bignasca. He was elected to the National Council, and represented the Canton of Ticino between 2003 and 2009.
