= Fulvio Pelli =

Swiss politician (born 1951)

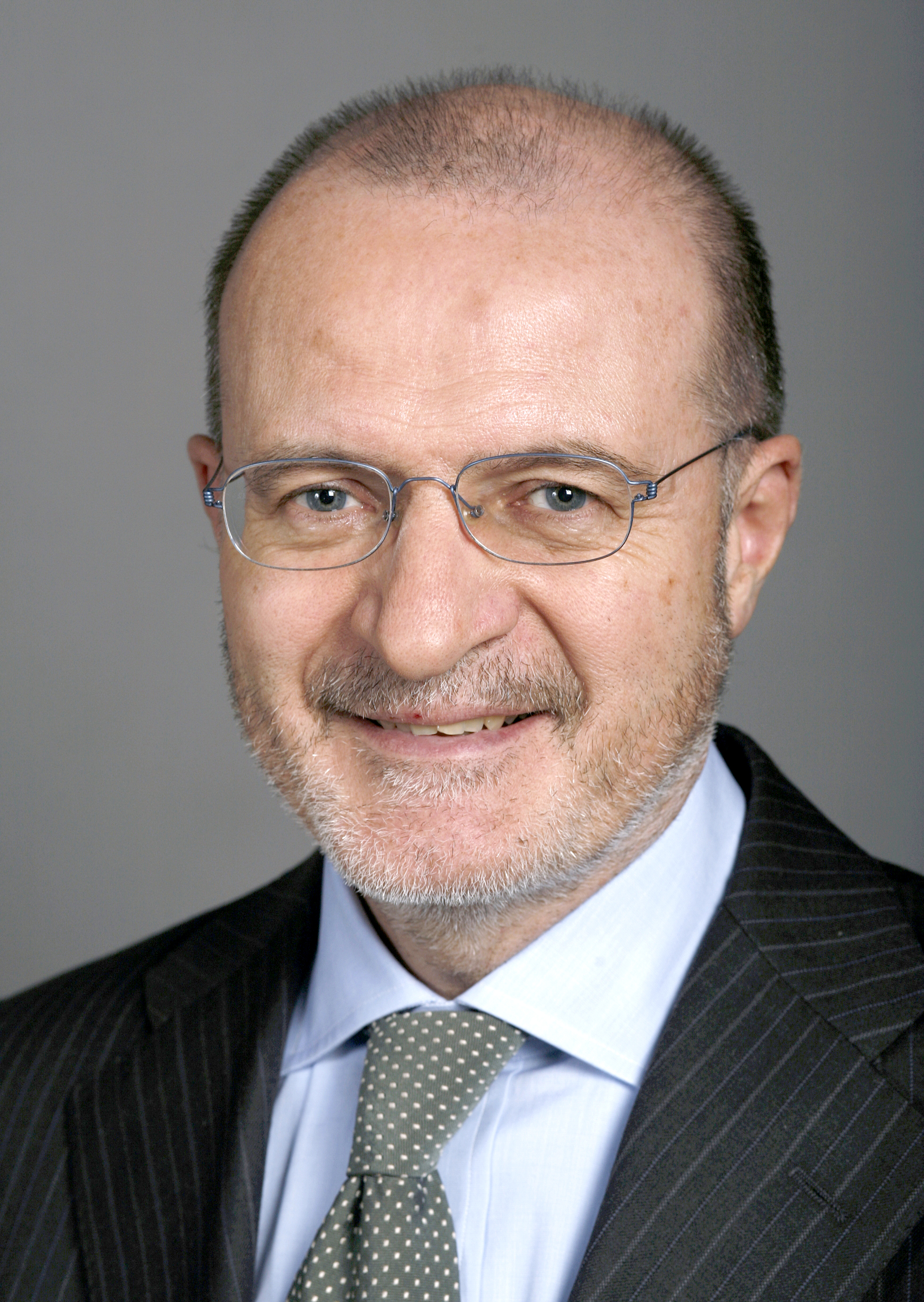

Chairman of FDP.The Liberals
- In office 2009–2012
- Preceded by: Position established
- Succeeded by: Philipp Müller

Chairman of the Free Democratic Party
- In office 2005–2009
- Preceded by: Marianne Kleiner
- Succeeded by: Position abolished

Member of the National Council
- In office 4 December 1995 – 6 March 2014

Member of the Grand Council of Ticino
- In office April 1983 – November 1995

Personal details
- Born: 25 January 1951 (age 75) Aranno, Ticino
- Party: Free Democratic Party (before 2009 merger with LP); FDP.The Liberals (after 2009)
- Children: 3

Fulvio Pelli (born 26 January 1951) is a Swiss politician. He was the last president of the Free Democratic Party prior to its merger with the Liberal Party of Switzerland. After the merger of the two parties, he served as the first president of FDP and the Liberals from 2009 to 2012. Pelli was a member of the Swiss National Council from 1995 to 2014. He served in the communal legislature of Lugano from 1980 to 1990 and in the Grand Council of Ticino from 1983 to 1995.

== Biography ==
Pelli was born in Aranno, in the Lugano District of Ticino. His father, Ferruccio, was the mayor of Lugano for 16 years. He studied law in Zurich and worked as a lawyer in Lugano.

In 1980, he gained a seat on the municipal council in Lugano and was elected to the Grand Council of Ticino in 1983. He was active in party politics, taking over the cantonal presidency of the Free Democrats in 1988. In 1992, he also took on a vice presidency in the national party. He was elected to the National Council, representing Ticino, in 1995. He gave up his party posts in 2000 and became the leader of the Free Democrats' delegation in the national council in 2002.

In 2004, FDP president Christiane Langenberger announced that she would not run for another term as president. This precipitated a period in which the party had four presidents over an 18-month period, with Rolf Schweiger and Marianne Kleiner taking the reins for a short time. Pelli ran against George Theiler and took 228 of 378 votes to win the presidency. After taking over, Pelli continued to work toward the close cooperation of the Liberal Party in elections that had started under Langenberger. In 2005, both parties agreed to form a union of liberal parties in the various federal and cantonal assemblies. After poor results in the 2007 elections, Liberal Party president Claude Ruey formally proposed a merger of the two parties. The merger took place on 1 January 2009. Pelli was named the party president, while Isabelle Moret, Ruedi Noser, Vincenzo Pedrazzini, and Pierre Weiss, the former LP president, joined as vice presidents.

In the 2011 Swiss federal election, his newly merged party failed to make gains and lost one seat in the National Council. Pelli announced that he would not be a candidate for re-election as party president in 2012. He was succeeded by Philipp Müller. In addition to his political work, he was on the boards of Mobiliar Holding and Banca dello Stato del Cantone Ticino. As of 2020, he was the chairman of the board of Banque Profil de Gestion, a Geneva-based private bank.
