= Henri Schmitt =

Swiss politician (1926–1982)

Henri Schmitt (1971)

Henri Schmitt (born May 23, 1926, in Plainpalais (today Geneva); † March 5, 1982 in Le Grand-Saconnex) was a Swiss politician (Free Democratic Party of Switzerland).

== Biography ==
Henri Schmitt completed his law studies at the University of Geneva and at the Graduate Institute of International and Development Studies of Geneva. He was admitted to the bar in 1949 and opened his own practice in 1951. He was president of the Swiss Young Liberals, then from 1957 to 1965 a liberal at the Grand Council of Geneva and from 1965 to 1977 state councilor. From 1963 to 1975, he was a member of Switzerland's National Council. From 1968 to 1974, he was president of the Free Democratic Party of Switzerland, and from 1972 to 1976 a member of the parliamentary assembly of the Council of Europe.

Schmitt created Geneva's Administrative Court in 1971, and the Geneva Office for the Promotion of Industry in 1976. As the only official Federal In 1973, he lost his seat on the National Council to Georges-André Chevallaz. He resigned as president of the Free Democratic Party of Switzerland the following year. Schmitt submitted to the National Council the country's first motion for women's suffrage in Switzerland.

Schmitt, who came from a modest background, was considered a conciliatory politician who, with his language skills, built a bridge between German- and French-speaking Switzerland, but on the other hand acted rigorously during violent demonstrations, which contributed to the failure of his candidacy for the Federal Council.

== Mandate ==
Schmitt acted as a commercial advocate among China, the Gulf states and Switzerland.
