= Andrea Caroni =

Swiss politician

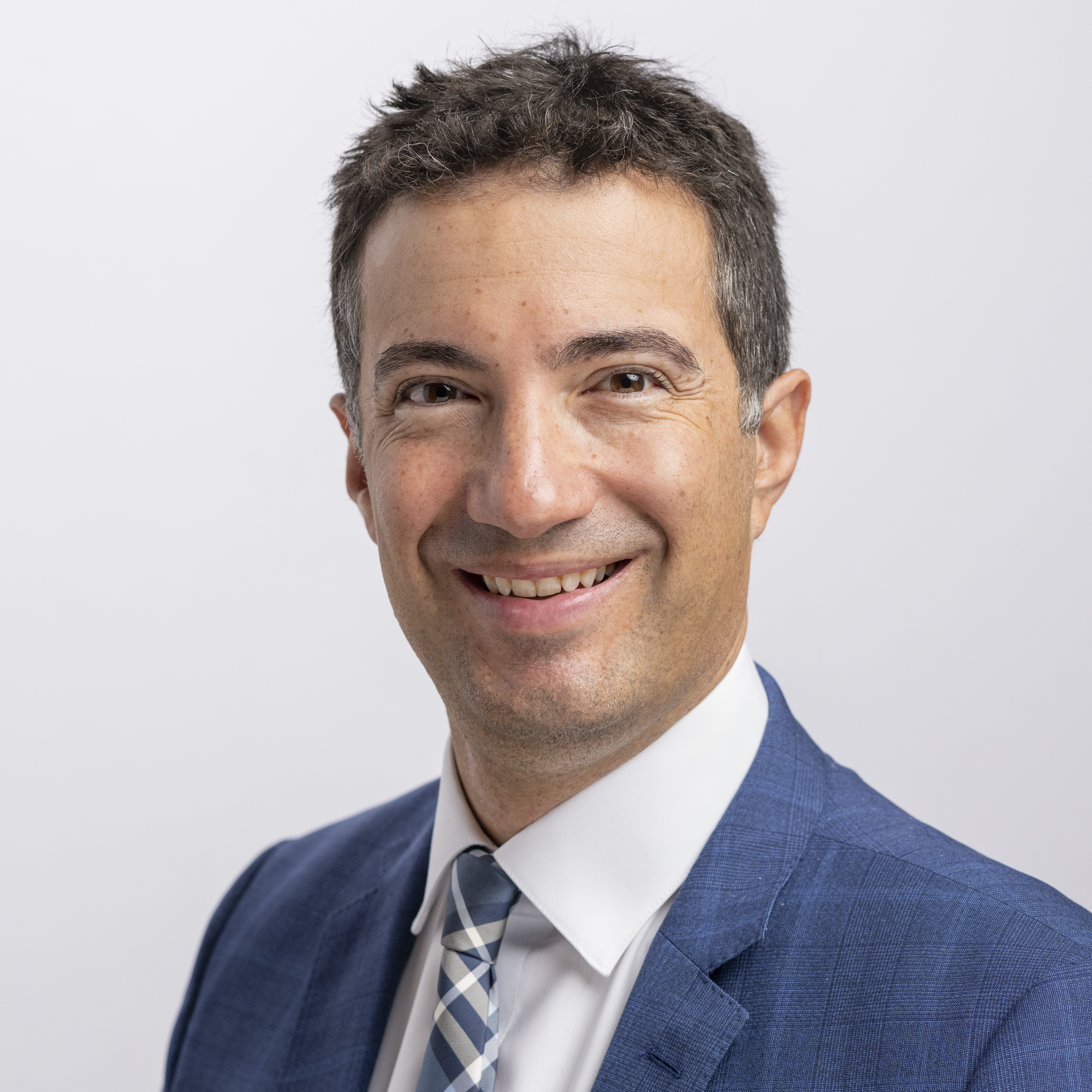
- Official portrait, 2023

President of the Council of States
- In office 2 December 2024 – 1 December 2025
- Preceded by: Eva Herzog
- Succeeded by: Stefan Engler

Member of the Council of States of Switzerland
- Incumbent
- Assumed office 30 November 2015
- Constituency: Appenzell Ausserrhoden

National Council
- In office 5 December 2011 – 29 November 2015
- Preceded by: Marianne Kleiner

Personal details
- Born: April 19, 1980 (age 46)
- Party: The Liberals
- Children: 2
- Education: University of Zurich (BA); Harvard Kennedy School (MPA)

Andrea Claudio Caroni (Italian pronunciation: [anˈdrɛːa ˈklaudjo kaˈroːni]; born 19 April 1980) is a Swiss lawyer and politician who currently serves on the Council of States since 2015. He previously served on the National Council (Switzerland) between 2011 and 2015, then the only representative from the Canton of Appenzell-Ausserrhoden. In 2024, Caroni was elected President of the Council of States for the 2024–2025 period.

== Early life and education ==
Caroni was born 19 April 1980 in St. Gallen, Switzerland, to Luciano Caroni and Vera Caroni (née Caflisch), an economist. His mother is from Grisons. He was partially raised in Wolfhalden and Grub, Appenzell-Ausserrhoden.

His paternal grandfather, Dr. Claudio Caroni (1907-1984), an attorney and industrialist, was of Ticinese origin from Rancate. In 1948, he took-over the delinquent Dornier plant in Altenrhein and rebranded them Flug- und Fahrzeugwerke Altenrhein (FFA) which manufactured airplanes, rail, funiculars, sailing boats, trams and road tankers. He was also a private investor and board member of several companies (most notably Aufzüge AG, Schaffhausen and Kuranstalten Bad Ragaz). His great-grandfather, Paul Jaberg (1878-1955), was president of Union Bank of Switzerland and board member of several companies including Bank in Winterthur, Sulzer and Saurer.

He completed his Matura at the Trogen Cantonal School and then studied Law at the University of Zürich and University of Lausanne. In 2007, he was admitted to the bar and completed his Juris Doctor in 2008 in State Law and International Law. Between 2008 and 2010, Caroni was personal assistant to Federal Councilor Hans-Rudolf Merz. Between 2010 and 2012, he completed a Master of Public Administration at Harvard Kennedy School.

== Professional career ==
Since 2012, Caroni is a lawyer at the firm ME Advocat Rechtsanwälte in Herisau. Since 2013, he is additionally a lecturer in public law at the University of St. Gallen.

== Personal life ==
In 2013, Caroni married Jasmine Graf. They have two children;

- Fiona Caroni (born 2014)
- Flavio Caroni (born 2016)

Since 2017, Caroni resides in Herisau.
