= Lorenzo Quadri =

Swiss attorney and politician

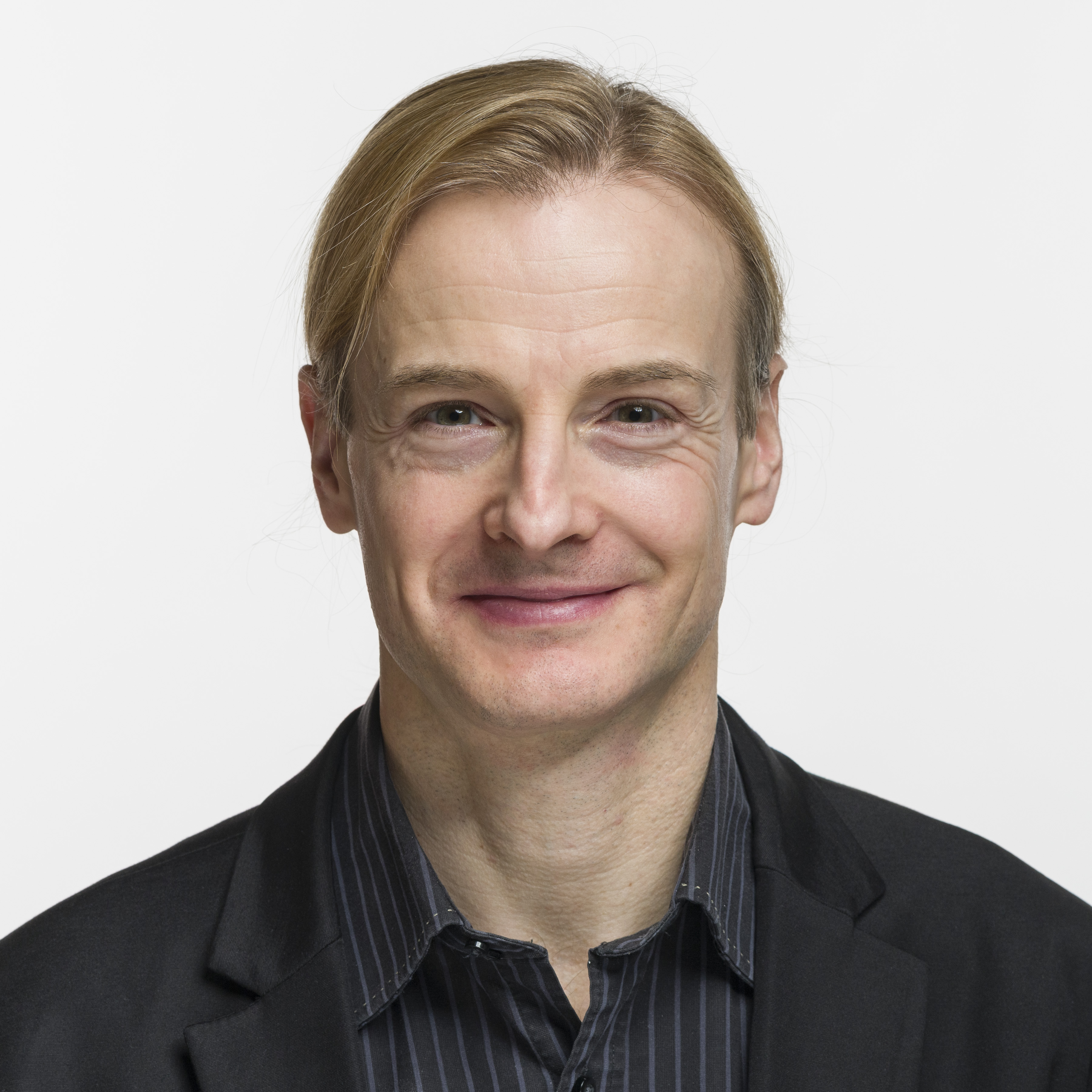
- Lorenzo Quadri (2019)

Member of the National Council (Switzerland)
- Incumbent
- Assumed office 30 November 2011
- Preceded by: Norman Gobbi
- Constituency: Canton of Ticino

Personal details
- Born: Lorenzo Ettore Quadri; 5 November 1974 (age 51) Lugano, Ticino, Switzerland
- Party: Ticino League
- Profession: Attorney, publisher and politician
- Website: lorenzoquadri.ch (in Italian)

Lorenzo Ettore Quadri (/kvɑːdrɪ/ born 5 November 1974) is a Swiss attorney, publisher and politician. He currently serves as a member of the National Council for the Ticino League since 30 November 2011. He previously served on the Grand Council of Ticino between 2003 and 2011. Since 2008, he also serves on the city council of Lugano.

== Early life and education ==
Quadri was born on 5 November 1974 in Lugano, Switzerland. He completed the local schools and studied Law at the University of Bern in Bern, Switzerland, where he graduated with a Licentiate degree in 1999.

== Career ==
In 1999, Quadri became chief editor for the weekly newspaper Il Mattino della Domenica (en. The Sunday Morning). A position he held until 2013. In 2013, he became the CEO of the newspaper.

== Politics ==
Quadri was elected into Grand Council of Ticino in April 2003, a position he continued to hold until 2011. He was a member on the Justice, political rights, political rights and corrections supervision commission. Since 2008, he is city councilor for Lugano, where he heads the education, welfare and social department.

In the 2011 Swiss federal election, Quadri was elected into the National Council for the Ticino League, succeeding Norman Gobbi.

== Personal life ==
Quadri is single and resides in Lugano.
