= Marianne Kleiner =

Swiss politician (born 1947)

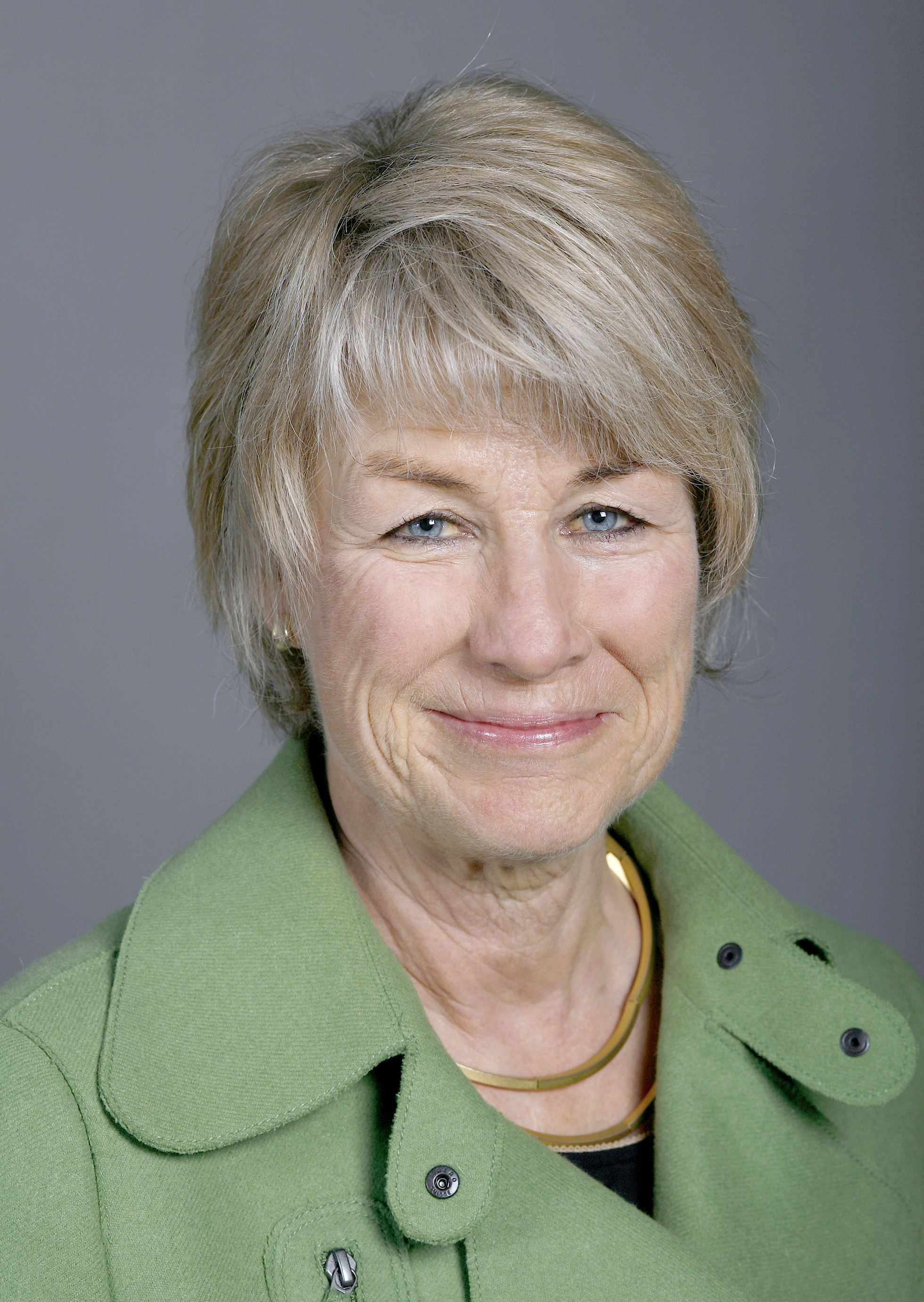

Member of the National Council
- In office 1 December 2003 – 4 December 2011
- Succeeded by: Andrea Caroni

President of the Radical Democratic Party
- In office 5 November 2004 – 5 March 2005
- Preceded by: Rolf Schweiger
- Succeeded by: Fulvio Pelli

State Councilor of Appenzell Ausserrhoden
- In office April 1994 – May 2003
- Preceded by: Position established
- Succeeded by: Rolf Degen

Personal details
- Born: Marianne Schläpfer; 29 May 1947 (age 79) Gossau, Switzerland
- Party: FDP (until 2009); The Liberals (after 2009)
- Spouse: Peter Kleiner (m. 1966)
- Children: 2
- Education: University of Zurich

Marianne Kleiner (née Schläpfer; born 29 May 1947) is a Swiss politician who served as a Member of the National Council from 2003 to 2011 and was President of the Radical Democratic Party from 2004 to 2005.

== Early life ==
Marianne Kleiner was born Marianne Schläpfer on 29 May 1947 in Gossau, in the canton of St. Gallen. She is originally from Rorschacherberg, in the same canton. Her father, Ernst Schläpfer, was a sales manager at the cannery in St. Gallen; her mother, born Hedi Schläpfer, was a housewife.

In 1966, she married Peter Kleiner, the sole editor of the Appenzeller Tagblatt, then director of the Zollikofer printing house. They have two children.

After her family moved to Hérisau, she attended primary and secondary school there, and obtained a maturity of the commercial type in St. Gallen. Once her children were teenagers, she began studying psychology at the University of Zurich in 1976, concluding with a bachelor's degree in 1979. She completed this with training in person-centered psychotherapy in Zurich (certificate in 1984).

From 1979 to 1994, she was a lecturer at the management center of the School of Economics and Social Sciences of the University of St. Gallen and led projects there.

== Political career ==
Kleiner joined the Francical Democratic Party (PRD) in 1994. She was elected the same year to the State Council of the Canton of Appenzell Ausserrhoden, even though she had no political experience. She is one of the first two women to sit on it, alongside Alice Scherrer-Baumann, five years after the introduction of women's suffrage. From 1994 to 2003, she headed the finance department. The first woman to be responsible for finance in a Swiss canton, she played an important role alongside the future federal councillor Hans-Rudolf Merz in the takeover of the bankrupt cantonal bank by UBS and also implemented cost-cutting and tax-reduction measures.

She was the first woman to lead the government of Appenzell Ausserrhoden (with the title of Landammann), from April 1997 to 2000. In 2003, she was elected to the National Council, where she sat until 2011. She sits on the Finance Committee (CdF) and, from the end of 2007 to the end of 2001, on the Social Security and Public Health Committee (CSSS). At the same time, she was Vice-President of the Swiss Radical Democratic Party from 1998 to 2006. She was also President ad interim from 2004 to 2005. Kleiner worked on several boards of foundations, associations and social and charitable organisations. She was the first woman to be admitted to the Rotary Club of Appenzell in 1999.

From 1998 to 2012, she was a member of the board of directors of the Institute of Tourism and Transport Economics at the University of St. Gallen. From 2011 to 2023, she chaired the cantonal section of Winterhilfe Schweiz, notably ensuring the external representation of the foundation. From 2014 to 2016, she chaired the Appenzell association for assistance to people with mental health problems, of which she then became vice-president.
