= Flavio Maspoli =

Swiss politician (1950–2007)

Flavio Maspoli (29 January 1950, Sorengo – 11/12 June 2007) was a Swiss politician and a co-founder of the Lega dei Ticinesi. He was a member of the Swiss National Council (1991–2003).
