= Gisèle Ory =

Swiss politician

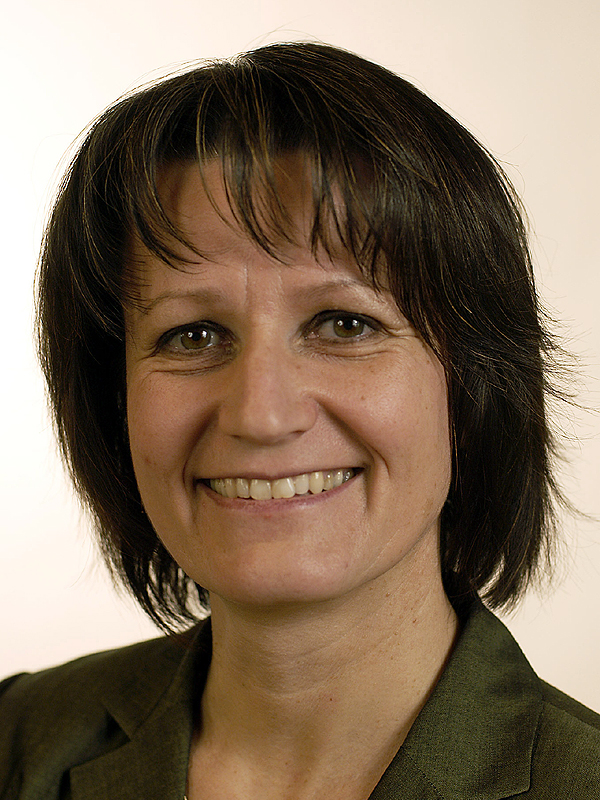
- Born: 30 April 1956 (age 70)
- Education: University of Lausanne (A.B. Pol Sci)
- Occupation: politician
- Political party: Socialist Party

Gisèle Ory (born 30 April 1956 in Biel/Bienne) is a politician from the Canton of Neuchâtel in Switzerland. She is a member of the Social Democratic Party of Switzerland.

Gisèle Ory graduated from the University of Lausanne (political sciences) in 1978. In 1996, she was elected to the municipal council of Chézard-Saint-Martin. In 2001 she was elected to the Grand Council of Neuchâtel. From 2001 to 2002 she was Chairwoman of the Neuchâtel section of the SP, but had to leave because of her nomination as spokeswoman of the Federal Department of the Interior.

Gisèle Ory was elected to the Council of States in 2003 along with Socialist Jean Studer. After Studer's resignation in 2006, she was joined by Pierre Bonhôte (also of the Social Democratic Party of Switzerland), who won a by-election against Philippe Bauer (Liberal Party of Switzerland).
