= Hans Uhlmann =

Swiss politician (born 1933)

Hans Uhlmann (born 11 November 1933 in Bonau, Switzerland) is a Swiss politician from the Swiss People's Party (SVP). A professional farmer, he has left the national political scene in 1999 and now works only behind the scenes.

Ulhman served on the council (1964–1987), the Grand Council of Thurgau (1980–1984) and the National Council (1983–1987). On 18 October 1987 Ulhmann was elected to the Senate for the canton of Thurgau, where he remained until 1999.

He served as president of the canton of Thurgau (1985–1989), and then the President of the SVP, following the presidency of Adolf Ogi.

Ulhmann's declared aim as a national party president was to open it to new voters, and in particular former Social Democratic Party (SP) voters, who no longer felt represented by their party.

Uhlmann is married and has two children.
