= Denis de la Reussille =

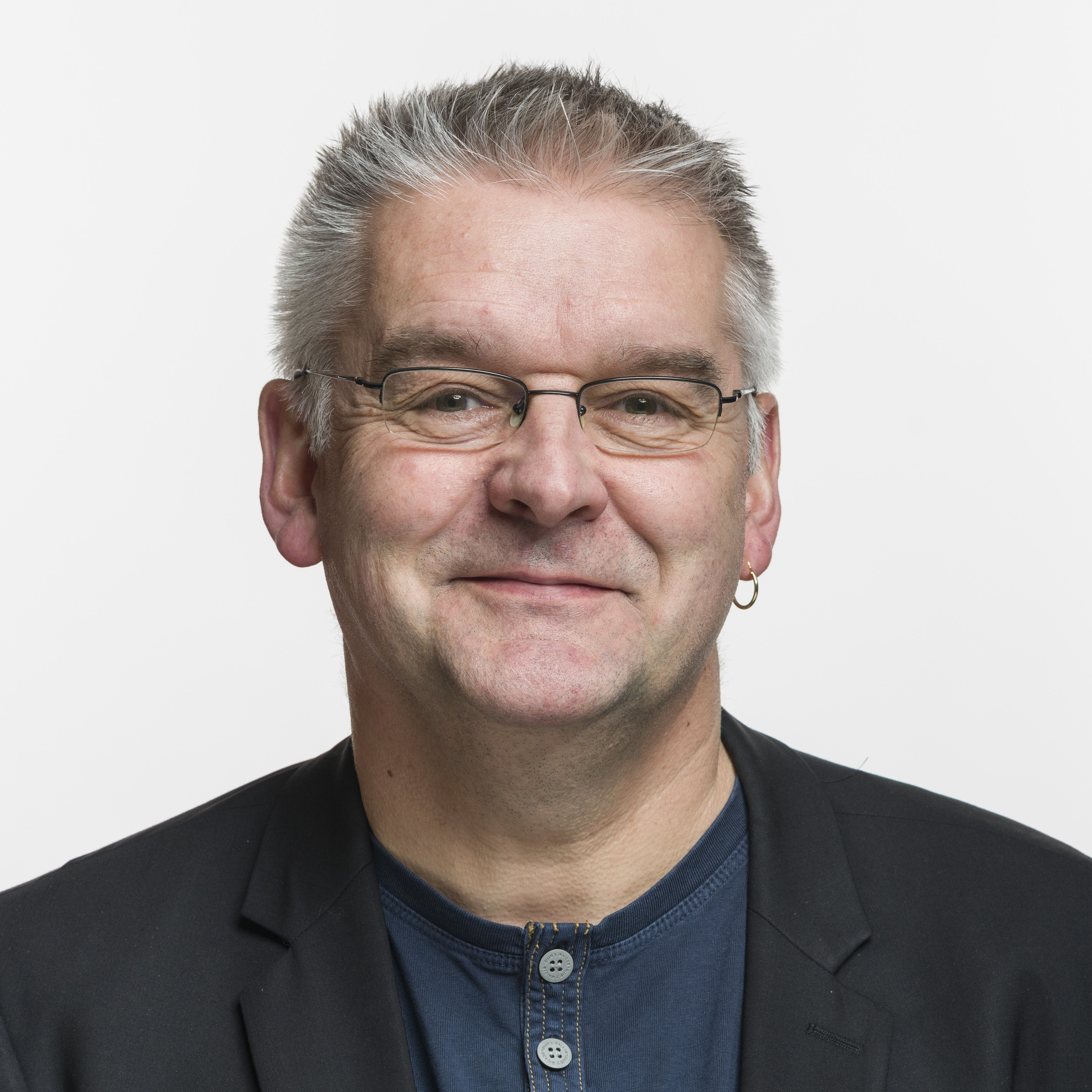
- Official portrait, 2019

Member of National Council (Switzerland)
- Incumbent
- Assumed office 30 November 2015
- Constituency: Canton of Neuchatel

Mayor of Le Locle
- In office 2000–2023

Personal details
- Born: Denis de la Reussille; 24 October 1960 (age 65) La Chaux-de-Fonds, Switzerland
- Party: Swiss Party of Labour
- Children: 2

Denis de la Reussille (born 24 October 1960) is a Swiss politician and labour unionist. He currently serves as a member of the National Council (Switzerland) since 2015 for the Swiss Party of Labour (PdA). He also served as mayor of Le Locle between 2000 and 2023 (town president).
