= Chantal Galladé =

Swiss politician (born 1972)

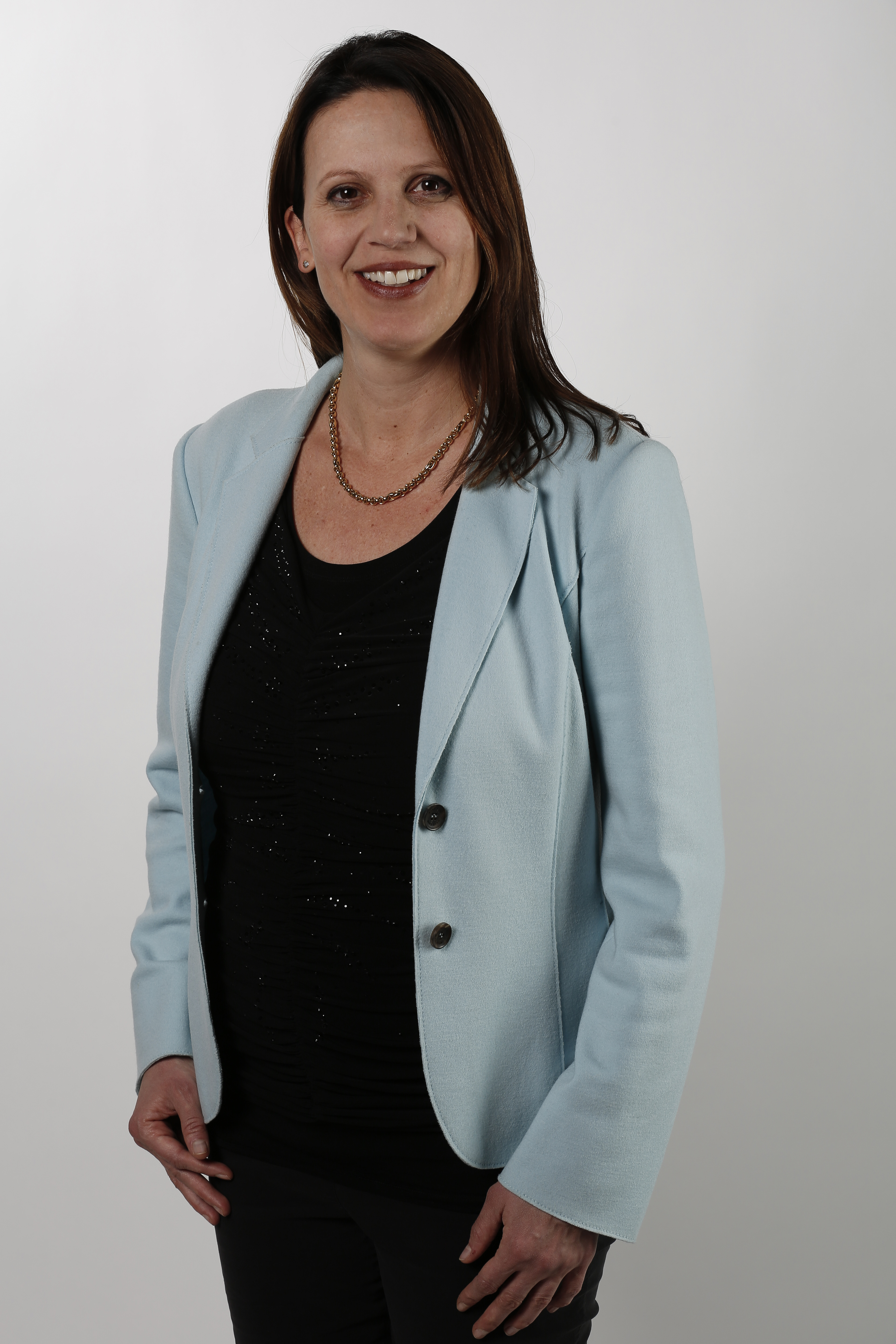
- Chantal Galladé in 2015

Member of the Cantonal Council of Zürich
- Incumbent
- Assumed office 18 August 1997
- Constituency: Winterthur

Member of the National Council (Switzerland)
- In office 1 December 2003 – 6 December 2018

Personal details
- Born: 17 December 1972 (age 53) Winterthur, Canton of Zürich, Switzerland
- Party: Green Liberal Party
- Other political affiliations: Social Democratic Party of Switzerland (until February 2019)
- Children: 2
- Education: University of Zurich
- Occupation: education researcher and politician
- Website: chantalgallade.ch (in German)

Chantal Juliane Galladé (born 17 December 1972) is a Swiss politician who currently serves on the Cantonal Council of Zürich for the Green Liberal Party. She previously served on the National Council (Switzerland) from 2003 to 2018 for the Social Democratic Party.

== Early life and education ==
Galladé was born on 17 December 1972 in Winterthur, Switzerland, to Georges-Roger Galladé, an attorney who was originally from Isérables in Valais, and Erika Galladé. Her father died by suicide in 1984 using his army rifle. She had a grandfather who was Jewish.

She completed a commercial apprenticeship from 1989 to 1992 and studied concurrently to complete her Maturity. She completed studies in pedagogy and political science at the University of Zürich.

== Professional career ==
Galladé was engaged as commissioner for apprenticeships, and professor at the cantonal college.

== Political career ==
In 1990, Chantal Galladé became a member of the Social Democratic Party (SP). She co-initiated the youth parliament (Jugendparlament), the youth lobby (Jugendlobby) and the cultural center (Kulturzentrum) in Winterthur in 1994. Three years later, Galladé was elected as member of the SP party in the parliament of the Canton of Zürich by 2003. Since December 2003, she's member of the Swiss National Council, among others focussing on the fields of youth, sustainability and national security policy.

At the beginning of June 2018, the eligible voters elected Galladé school president of the district school administration (Kreisschulpflege) in Winterthur Stadt-Töss. Due to the full-time office, she will step down from the National Council at the end of November 2018. In February 2019, she decided to change to the Green Liberal Party (GLP) as she didn't agree with the SP, who opposed further cooperation between the European Union and Switzerland due to Workers' Unions concerns.

== Personal life ==
Chantal Galladé is the mother of a daughter born in 2005. She was in a relationship with Daniel Jositsch.
