= Rolf Schweiger =

Swiss politician (1945–2025)

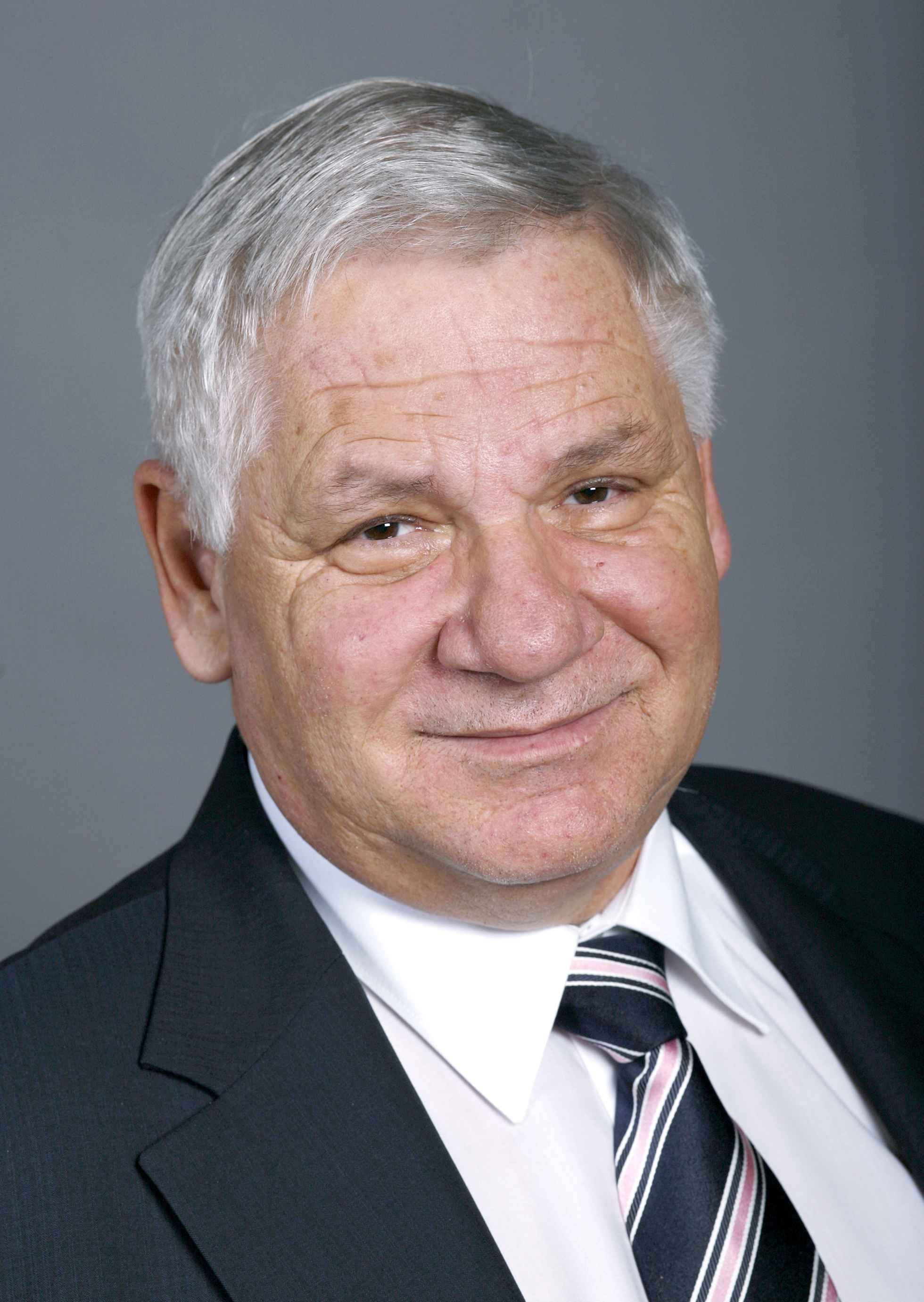
- Schweiger in 2007

Member of the Council of States of Switzerland
- In office 1 March 1999 – 4 December 2011

President of the Free Democratic Party of Switzerland
- In office 16 April 2004 – 5 November 2004
- Preceded by: Christiane Langenberger
- Succeeded by: Marianne Kleiner

Member of the Cantonal Council of Zug
- In office May 1976 – December 1994
- In office January 1971 – December 1974

Personal details
- Born: 9 January 1945; Baar, Zug, Switzerland
- Died: 11 January 2025 (aged 80); Baar, Zug, Switzerland
- Political party: FDP (until 2009); The Liberals (2009–2025)
- Education: University of Zurich
- Occupation: Lawyer

Rolf Schweiger (9 January 1945 – 11 January 2025) was a Swiss politician of the Free Democratic Party (FDP) and The Liberals.

== Life and career ==
Born in Baar on 9 January 1945, Schweiger studied law at the University of Zurich and was admitted to the bar in 1970. That year, he joined the FDP and was subsequently elected to the Cantonal Council of Zug, where he served until 1974 and again from 1976 to 1994. From 1980 to 1994, he led the FDP in the cantonal council. He represented the Canton of Zug in the Council of States from 1999 to 2011. He briefly led the FDP from April to November 2004 but resigned due to occupational burnout. In May 2011, he announced that he would not stand in the federal election.

Schweiger died in Baar on 11 January 2025, at the age of 80.
