= Ticino League =

Political party in Switzerland

- German name: Liga der Tessiner
- French name: Ligue des Tessinois
- Italian name: Lega dei Ticinesi
- President: Norman Gobbi
- Founded: 17 January 1991
- Headquarters: Via Monte Boglia 3, CH-6900 Lugano
- Youth wing: Movimento Giovani Leghisti
- Membership (2015): 1,500
- Ideology: Regionalism; National conservatism; Right-wing populism; Anti-environmentalism; Anti-immigration; Euroscepticism
- Political position: Right-wing
- Colours: Blue, Red
- National Council: 1 / 200
- Council of States: 0 / 46
- Cantonal Executives: 2 / 5 (Note: Total number of seats represents the Ticino Council of State, not the total number of cantonal executive seats in Switzerland.)
- Cantonal legislatures: 14 / 90 (Note: Total number of seats represents the Grand Council of Ticino, not the total number of cantonal parliament seats in Switzerland.)

Website
- lega-dei-ticinesi.ch

The Ticino League (Italian: Lega dei Ticinesi) is a regionalist, national-conservative political party in Switzerland active in the canton of Ticino.

The party was founded in 1991 by entrepreneur Giuliano Bignasca and journalist Flavio Maspoli. After some public campaigning in the Sunday newspaper Il Mattino della Domenica against political power and the use of public money, Bignasca and Maspoli founded the Ticino League to continue the fight at the political level. Bignasca (1945–2013) was the League's "president for life".

The League is one of the four major parties in the canton, alongside the Liberal Radical Party (PLR), the Democratic People's Party (PPD), and the Swiss Socialist Party (PS). Since 1991, the party has been represented in the National Council and the five-member cantonal executive of Ticino (the Council of State, Consiglio di Stato) with two seats. In the 90-seat Ticino legislature (the Grand Council, Gran Consiglio), the party has 18 seats.

At the 2011 federal election, the party won 0.8% of the national popular vote and secured two out of 200 seats in the National Council (the first chamber of the Swiss parliament), doubling their representation compared to the single seat they held in 2007 with 0.5% of the vote. In the 2015 election, the Ticino League slightly increased its share of the national vote to 1.0% and kept its two seats in parliament. The party is not represented in the Council of States nor on the Federal Council.

The 2019 Swiss federal election cost the League one of its representatives in the National Council, as Roberta Pantani was unable to hold her seat. Lorenzo Quadri was re-elected as the League's sole representative in the Parliament. The League formed an electoral list with the Swiss People's Party (SVP) for the 2023 Swiss federal election; the SVP was seen as gaining support at the League's expense.

== Ideology ==
In the Federal Assembly, the League sits with the Swiss People's Party (UDC), and commentators see it as the Swiss Italian equivalent of the UDC (although the UDC has a cantonal section, as well as seats in the Grand Council of Ticino). A more notable political position of the League is its support for banning the Burqa, which it achieved in 2015.

The League defines itself as neither a left nor a right-wing party, but is generally characterised as a right-wing populist. It is also strongly eurosceptic, supporting Swiss sovereignty and reduced immigration. It also argues for the protection of Swiss and Ticino national identity, wanting a more friendly environment for small businesses and policies to protect the elderly and more vulnerable members of society.

Although ideologically close to the UDC, the League has taken a more moderate posture on gay rights and voted in favour of the Marriage For All bill, which opened the process for the legalization of same-sex marriage in Switzerland. The party took a neutral stance during the 2021 Swiss same-sex marriage referendum.

The League supports continued Ticino membership in Switzerland. However, it supports the project of Insubria and has some ties with the regional and federalist northern Italian rightist party Lega Nord.

== Election results ==
=== National Council ===
| Election | Votes | % | Seats | +/- |
|---|---|---|---|---|
| 1991 | 28,290 | 1.4% (#11) | 2 / 200 | New |
| 1995 | 17,940 | 0.9% (#14) | 1 / 200 | ▼1 |
| 1999 | 17,118 | 0.9% (#11) | 2 / 200 | ▲1 |
| 2003 | 7,304 | 0.4% (#14) | 1 / 200 | ▼1 |
| 2007 | 13,031 | 0.6% (#11) | 1 / 200 | 0 |
| 2011 | 19,657 | 0.8% (#9) | 2 / 200 | ▲1 |
| 2015 | 24,713 | 1.0% (#10) | 2 / 200 | 0 |
| 2019 | 18,187 | 0.8% (#12) | 1 / 200 | ▼1 |
| 2023 | 14,160 | 0.6% (#10) | 1 / 200 | 0 |

== Literature ==
- Mazzoleni, Oscar (2005). Multi-Level Populism and Centre-Periphery Cleavage in Switzerland: The Case of the Lega dei Ticinesi. Vol. Challenges to Consensual Politics: Democracy, Identity, and Populist Protest in the Alpine Region. Brussels: P.I.E.-Peter Lang. pp. 209–228.

== See also ==
- Marco Borradori
