= Free Democratic Party of Switzerland =

Free Democratic Party/Radical Democratic Party German: Freisinnig-Demokratische Partei French: Parti radical-démocratique Italian: Partito Liberale Radicale Romansh: Partida liberaldemocrata svizra
- Founded: 1894; 132 years ago
- Dissolved: 1 January 2009; 17 years ago
- Merged into: FDP. The Liberals
- Headquarters: Neuengasse 20; Postfach 6136; CH-3001 Bern
- Ideology: Liberalism (Switzerland); Classical liberalism Conservative liberalism
- Political position: Centre-right
- European affiliation: European Liberal Democrat and Reform Party
- International affiliation: Radical International (before 1938); Liberal International (after 1947)
- Colours: Azure

The Free Democratic Party (German: Freisinnig-Demokratische Partei, FDP; Romansh: Partida liberaldemocrata svizra, PLD), also called Radical Democratic Party (French: Parti radical-démocratique, PRD; Italian: Partito liberale-radicale svizzero, PLR) was a liberal political party in Switzerland. Formerly one of the major parties in Switzerland, on 1 January 2009 it merged with the Liberal Party of Switzerland to form FDP. The Liberals.

The FDP was formed in 1894 from the Radicals, who had dominated Swiss politics since the 1830s, standing in opposition to the Catholic conservatives, and who from the creation of the federal state in 1848 until 1891 formed the federal government.

The FDP remained dominant until the introduction of proportional representation in 1919. From 1945 to 1987, it alternated with the Social Democratic Party to be the largest party. In 1959, the party took two seats in the magic formula. The party declined in the 1990s and 2000s (decade), as it was put under pressure by the Swiss People's Party. In response, the party formed closer relations with the smaller Liberal Party, leading to their formal merger in 2009.

== History ==
The elements 'liberal', 'radical' and freisinnig (an obsolete German word for 'liberal', or literally "free thinking") in the party's name originate from the conflicts during the period of Swiss Restoration between the Catholic-conservative cantons and the liberal cantons. This conflict led to the foundation of the Swiss federal state in 1848 after the victory of the predominantly Protestant and liberal cantons over the conservative and Catholic ones in the Sonderbund War.

German-language logo

From 1848 until 1891, the Federal Council was composed entirely of Radicals. The radical movement of the restoration was anti-clerical, and stood in opposition to the Catholic Conservative Party, the ancestor of the modern Christian Democratic People's Party. They were otherwise heterogeneous, including and classical liberal 'Liberals', federalist 'Radicals', and social liberal 'Democrats': placing the radical movement on the 'left' of the political spectrum. It was not until the rise of the Social Democratic Party in the early 20th century that the FDP found itself on the centre-right.

The FDP was the dominant party until the 1919 election, when the introduction of proportional representation led to a leap in the representation of the Social Democrats. In 1959, the Free Democrats joined the other major parties in agreeing the 'magic formula' to divide up the seats of the Federal Council, with the FDP permanently receiving two of the seven seats.

After the 2003 elections, lawmakers of FDP and Liberal Party formed a common parliamentary group in the Federal Assembly. In June 2005, they strengthened their cooperation by founding the Radical and Liberal Union. They merged on 1 January 2009 to form FDP. The Liberals.

== Election results ==
In 2003, it held 36 mandates (out of 200) in the National Council (lower chamber of the Swiss parliament); 14 (out of 46) in the Council of States, the upper chamber, and two out of seven mandates in the Swiss Federal Council (executive body). By 2005, it held 27.2% of the seats in the Swiss Cantonal governments and 19.7% in the Swiss Cantonal parliaments (index "BADAC", weighted with the population and number of seats). At the last legislative elections, 22 October 2007, the party won 15.6% of the popular vote and 31 out of 200 seats.

=== National Council ===
Election	Votes	%	Seats	+/–	Rank
1896	181,028	47.8 (#1)	86 / 147	▲12	1st
1899	183,216	49.7 (#1)	82 / 147	▼2	1st
1902	205,235	50.4 (#1)	100 / 167	▲16	1st
1905	202,605	49.2 (#1)	104 / 167	▲4	1st
1908	202,732	50.9 (#1)	105 / 167	▲1	1st
1911	198,300	49.5 (#1)	115 / 189	▲10	1st
1914	191,054	56.1 (#1)	112 / 189	▼3	1st
1917	210,323	40.8 (#1)	103 / 189	▼9	1st
1919	215,566	28.8 (#1)	60 / 189	▼43	1st
1922	208,144	28.3 (#1)	60 / 198	Steady	1st
1925	206,485	27.8 (#1)	60 / 198	Steady	1st
1928	220,135	27.4 (#2)	58 / 198	▼2	1st
1931	232,562	26.9 (#2)	52 / 187	▼6	1st
1935	216,664	23.7 (#2)	48 / 187	▼4	▼2nd
1939	128,163	20.7 (#2)	49 / 187	▲1	▲1st
1943	197,746	22.5 (#2)	47 / 194	▼2	▼2nd
1947	220,486	23.0 (#2)	52 / 194	▲5	▲1st
1951	230,687	24.0 (#2)	51 / 196	▼1	▲1st
1955	227,370	23.3 (#2)	50 / 196	▼1	▼2nd
1959	232,557	23.7 (#2)	51 / 196	▲1	▲1st (Note: Tied with the Social Democratic Party.)
1963	230,200	23.9 (#2)	51 / 200	Steady	▼2nd
1967	230,095	23.2 (#2)	49 / 200	▼2	2nd
1971	432,259	21.7 (#2)	49 / 200	Steady	▲1st
1975	428,919	22.2 (#2)	47 / 200	▼2	▼2nd
1979	440,099	24.0 (#2)	51 / 200	▼4	▲1st
1983	457,283	23.3 (#1)	54 / 200	▲3	1st
1987	457,283	22.9 (#1)	51 / 200	▼3	1st
1991	429,072	21.0 (#1)	44 / 200	▼7	1st
1995	384,515	20.2 (#2)	45 / 200	▲1	▼2nd
1999	388,780	19.9 (#3)	43 / 200	▼2	▼3rd
2003	364,493	17.3 (#3)	36 / 200	▼7	3rd
2007	364,736	15.8 (#3)	31 / 200	▼5	3rd

== List of party Presidents ==
	Name	Canton	Years
1st	Christian Friedrich Göttisheim	Basel-Stadt	1894–1896
2nd	Ernst Brenner	Basel-Stadt	1896–1897
3rd	Johannes Stössel	Zurich	1897–1898
4th	Johann Hirter	Bern	1898–1903
5th	Paul Scherrer	Basel-Stadt	1904–1906
6th	Walter Bissegger	Zurich	1907–1910
7th	Camille Decoppet	Vaud	1911–1912
8th	Félix Bonjour	Vaud	1912–1913
9th	Emil Lohner	Bern	1914–1918
10th	Robert Schöpfer	Solothurn	1919–1923
11th	Albert Meyer	Zurich	1923–1929
12th	Hermann Schüpbach	Bern	1929–1934
13th	Ernest Béguin	Neuchâtel	1934–1940
14th	Max Wey	Luzern	1940–1948
15th	Aleardo Pini	Ticino	1948–1954
16th	Eugen Dietschi	Basel-Stadt	1954–1960
17th	Nello Celio	Ticino	1960–1964
18th	Pierre Glasson	Fribourg	1964–1968
19th	Henri Schmitt	Geneva	1968–1974
20th	Fritz Honegger	Zurich	1974–1977
21st	Yann Richter	Neuchâtel	1978–1984
22nd	Bruno Hunziker	Aargau	1984–1989
23rd	Franz Steinegger	Uri	1989–2001
24th	Gerold Bührer	Schaffhausen	2001–2002
25th	Christiane Langenberger	Vaud	2002–2004
26th	Rolf Schweiger	Zug	2004
27th	Marianne Kleiner	Appenzell Innerrhoden	2004–2005
28th	Fulvio Pelli	Ticino	2005–2009

== See also ==
- Liberalism and radicalism in Switzerland
