= List of presidents of the National Council of Switzerland =

The President of the National Council of Switzerland (German: Nationalratspräsident; French: Président du Conseil national, Italian: Presidente del Consiglio nazionale; Romansh: President dal cussegl naziunal) presides over the National Council and Federal Assembly. The National Council President is often colloquially referred to as the "highest Swiss person" (German: der Höchste Schweizer), as the highest ranking person subject to the people's vote. However, this is an honorary title and the president is not the head of state; the head of state is the entire Federal Council. In the official order of precedence, she or he ranks behind the members of the Federal Council, but ahead of the President of the Swiss Council of States.

The President of the National Council also chairs the United Federal Assembly which meets to set elections, decides conflicts of jurisdiction between federal authorities and issues pardons. The officeholder is elected by the National Council for a term of one year without the possibility and may not be elected for a second consecutive term, but may be elected to the post in the future.

== List of presidents of the National Council ==
No.	Portrait	Name (Lifespan)	Term	Party	Canton
1		Ulrich Ochsenbein (1811–1890)	1848	Radical Left	Bern
2		Jakob Robert Steiger (1801–1862)	1848–1849	Radical Left	Lucerne
3		Alfred Escher (1819–1882)	1849–1850	Radical Left	Zurich
4		Johann Konrad Kern (1808–1888)	1850–1851	Radical Left	Thurgau
5		Jakob Stämpfli (1820–1879)	1851	Radical Left	Bern
6		Johann Jakob Trog (1807–1867)	1851–1852	Radical Left	Solothurn
7		Johann Matthias Hungerbühler (1805–1884)	1852–1853	Radical Left	St. Gallen
8		Giovanni Battista Pioda (1808–1882)	1853–1854	Radical Left	Ticino
9		Jakob Dubs (1822–1879)	1854	Radical Left	Zurich
10		Casimir Pfyffer (1794–1875)	1854–1855	Radical Left	Lucerne
11		Eduard Blösch (1807–1866)	1855–1856	Evangelical Right	Bern
12		Friedrich Siegfried (1809–1882)	1856	Radical Left	Aargau
13		Jules Martin (1824–1875)	1856	Radical Left	Vaud
(3)		Alfred Escher (1819–1882)	1856–1857	Radical Left	Zurich
14		Paul Migy (1814–1879)	1857	Radical Left	Bern
15		Augustin Keller (1805–1883)	1857–1858	Radical Left	Aargau
16		Johann Jakob Stehlin (1803–1879)	1858–1859	Liberal Centre	Basel-Stadt
17		Friedrich Peyer im Hof (1817–1900)	1859–1860	Radical Left	Schaffhausen
18		Johann Baptist Weder (1800–1872)	1860	Radical Left	St. Gallen
19		Édouard Dapples (1807–1887)	1860–1861	Liberal Centre	Vaud
20		Karl Karrer (1815–1886)	1861–1862	Radical Left	Bern
(3)		Alfred Escher (1819–1882)	1862–1863	Liberal Centre	Zurich
21		Joachim Heer (1825–1879)	1863	Liberal Centre	Glarus
22		Victor Ruffy (1823–1869)	1863–1864	Radical Left	Vaud
23		Gottlieb Jäger (1805–1891)	1864–1865	Liberal Centre	Aargau
24		Andreas Rudolf von Planta (1819–1889)	1865–1866	Liberal Centre	Grisons
25		Niklaus Niggeler (1817–1872)	1866	Radical Left	Bern
26		Jules Philippin (1818–1882)	1866–1867	Radical Left	Neuchâtel
(16)		Johann Jakob Stehlin (1803–1879)	1867–1868	Liberal Centre	Basel-Stadt
27		Simon Kaiser (1828–1898)	1868–1869	Radical Left	Solothurn
28		Louis Ruchonnet (1834–1893)	1869	Radical Left	Vaud
(21)		Joachim Heer (1825–1879)	1869–1870	Liberal Centre	Glarus
29		Fridolin Anderwert (1828–1880)	1870–1871	Democratic Left	Thurgau
30		Rudolf Brunner (1827–1894)	1871–1872	Radical Left	Bern
31		Charles Friderich (1828–1880)	1872	Liberal Centre	Geneva
32		Daniel Wirth (1815–1901)	1872–1873	Liberal Centre	St. Gallen
33		Gottlieb Ziegler (1828–1898)	1873–1874	Democratic Left	Zurich
34		Carl Feer-Herzog (1820–1880)	1874	Liberal Centre	Aargau
(28)		Louis Ruchonnet (1834–1893)	1874–1875	Radical Left	Vaud
(5)		Jakob Stämpfli (1820–1879)	1875	Radical Left	Bern
35		Emil Frey (1838–1922)	1875–1876	Democratic Left	Basel-Landschaft
36		Arnold Otto Aepli (1816–1897)	1876–1877	Liberal Centre	St. Gallen
37		Eduard Marti (1829–1896)	1877–1878	Radical Left	Bern
(26)		Jules Philippin (1818–1882)	1878	Radical Left	Neuchâtel
38		Melchior Römer (1831–1895)	1878–1879	Liberal Centre	Zurich
39		Arnold Künzli (1832–1908)	1879–1880	Radical Left	Aargau
40		Karl Burckhardt (1830–1893)	1880–1881	Radical Left	Basel-Stadt
41		Antoine Vessaz (1833–1911)	1881	Radical Left	Vaud
42		Karl Zyro (1834–1896)	1881–1882	Radical Left	Bern
43		Adolf Deucher (1831–1912)	1882–1883	DP	Thurgau
(27)		Simon Kaiser (1828–1898)	1883–1884	Radical Left	Solothurn
44		Georges Favon (1843–1902)	1884	Radical Left	Geneva
45		Johannes Stössel (1837–1919)	1884–1885	DP	Zurich
46		Andrea Bezzola (1840–1897)	1885–1886	Radical Left	Grisons
47		Henri Morel (1838–1912)	1886–1887	Radical Left	Neuchâtel
48		Josef Zemp (1834–1908)	1887	Catholic Right	Lucerne
49		Erwin Kurz (1846–1901)	1887–1888	Radical Left	Aargau
50		Eugène Ruffy (1854–1919)	1888–1889	Radical Left	Vaud
51		Friedrich Heinrich Häberlin (1834–1897)	1889–1890	Radical Left	Thurgau
52		August Suter (1829–1901)	1890	Radical Left	St. Gallen
53		Eduard Müller (1848–1919)	1890–1891	Radical Left	Bern
54		Adrien Lachenal (1849–1918)	1891–1892	Radical Left	Geneva
55		Albert Brosi (1836–1911)	1892–1893	Radical Left	Solothurn
56		Ludwig Forrer (1845–1921)	1893	DP	Zurich
57		Robert Comtesse (1847–1922)	1893–1894	Radical Left	Neuchâtel
58		Ernst Brenner (1856–1911)	1894–1895	FDP	Basel-Stadt
59		Jakob Huldreich Bachmann (1843–1915)	1895–1896	Liberal Centre	Thurgau
60		Joseph Stockmar (1851–1919)	1896	FDP	Bern
61		Rudolf Gallati (1845–1904)	1896	Liberal Centre	Glarus
62		Johann Joseph Keel (1837–1902)	1896–1897	Catholic Right	St. Gallen
63		Robert Grieshaber (1846–1928)	1897–1898	FDP	Schaffhausen
64		Adrien Thélin (1842–1922)	1898–1899	FDP	Vaud
65		Hermann Heller (1850–1917)	1899	FDP	Lucerne
66		Rudolf Geilinger (1848–1911)	1899–1900	FDP	Zurich
67		Fritz Bühlmann (1848–1936)	1900–1901	FDP	Bern
68		Gustave Ador (1845–1928)	1901–1902	Liberal Centre	Geneva
69		Ulrich Meister (1838–1917)	1902	FDP	Zurich
70		Clemens Iten (1858–1932)	1902	FDP	Zug
71		Conradin Zschokke (1842–1918)	1902–1903	FDP	Aargau
72		Louis Martin (1838–1913)	1903–1904	FDP	Neuchâtel
73		Josef Anton Schobinger (1849–1911)	1904–1905	Catholic Right	Lucerne
74		Johann Hirter (1855–1926)	1905–1906	FDP	Bern
75		Camille Decoppet (1862–1925)	1906–1907	FDP	Vaud
76		Paul Speiser (1846–1935)	1907–1908	Liberal Centre	Basel-Stadt
77		Adolf Germann (1857–1924)	1908–1909	FDP	Thurgau
78		Virgile Rossel (1858–1933)	1909–1910	FDP	Bern
79		Joseph Kuntschen (1849–1928)	1910–1911	Catholic Right	Valais
80		Karl Emil Wild (1856–1923)	1911–1912	FDP	St. Gallen
81		Carl Spahn (1863–1943)	1912–1913	FDP	Schaffhausen
82		Alfred von Planta (1857–1922)	1913–1914	LPS	Grisons
83		Felix Bonjour (1858–1942)	1914–1915	FDP	Vaud
84		Arthur Eugster (1863–1922)	1915–1916	FDP	Appenzell Ausserrhoden
85		Anton Büeler (1858–1939)	1916–1917	KVP	Schwyz
86		Henri Calame (1867–1936)	1917–1918	FDP	Neuchâtel
87		Heinrich Häberlin (1868–1947)	1918–1919	FDP	Thurgau
88		Eduard Blumer (1848–1925)	1919–1920	DP	Glarus
89		Evaristo Garbani-Nerini (1867–1944)	1920–1921	FDP	Ticino
90		Emil Klöti (1877–1963)	1921–1922	SP	Zurich
91		Johann Jenny (1857–1937)	1922–1923	BGB	Bern
92		Raymond Evéquoz (1863–1945)	1923–1924	KVP	Valais
93		Albert Mächler (1868–1937)	1924–1925	FDP	St. Gallen
94		Emil Hofmann (1865–1927)	1925–1926	DP	Thurgau
95		Paul Maillefer (1862–1929)	1926–1927	FDP	Vaud
96		Rudolf Minger (1881–1955)	1927–1928	BGB	Bern
97		Heinrich Walther (1862–1954)	1928–1929	KVP	Lucerne
98		Ernest-Paul Graber (1875–1956)	1929–1930	SP	Neuchâtel
99		Hans Sträuli (1862–1938)	1930–1931	DP	Zurich
100		Heinrich Roman Abt (1883–1942)	1931–1932	BGB	Aargau
101		Ruggero Dollfus (1876–1948)	1932–1933	KVP	Ticino
102		Johannes Huber (1879–1948)	1933–1934	SP	St. Gallen
103		Hermann Schüpbach (1877–1949)	1934–1935	FDP	Bern
104		Rudolf Reichling (1890–1977)	1935–1936	BGB	Zurich
105		Maurice Troillet (1880–1961)	1936–1937	KVP	Valais
106		Fritz Hauser (1884–1941)	1937–1938	SP	Basel-Stadt
107		Henry Vallotton (1891–1971)	1938–1939	FDP	Vaud
108		Hans Stähli (1889–1963)	1939–1940	BGB	Bern
109		Emil Nietlispach (1887–1962)	1940–1941	KVP	Aargau
110		Charles Rosselet (1893–1946)	1941–1942	SP	Geneva
111		Emil Keller (1878–1965)	1942–1943	FDP	Aargau
112		Paul Gysler (1893–1966)	1943–1944	BGB	Zurich
113		Pierre Aeby (1884–1957)	1944–1945	KVP	Fribourg
114		Robert Grimm (1881–1958)	1945–1946	SP	Bern
115		Max Wey (1892–1953)	1946–1947	FDP	Lucerne
116		Albert Picot (1882–1966)	1947–1948	LPS	Geneva
117		Josef Escher (1885–1954)	1948–1949	KVP	Valais
118		Jacques Schmid (1882–1960)	1949–1950	SP	Solothurn
119		Aleardo Pini (1907–1960)	1950–1951	FDP	Ticino
120		Karl Renold (1888–1959)	1951–1952	BGB	Aargau
121		Thomas Holenstein (1896–1962)	1952–1953	KVP	St. Gallen
122		Henri Perret (1928–1955)	1953–1954	SP	Neuchâtel
123		Hermann Häberlin (1894–1975)	1954–1955	FDP	Zurich
124		Paul Burgdorfer (1903–1973)	1955–1956	BGB	Bern
125		Josef Condrau (1894–1974)	1956–1957	KVP	Grisons
126		Robert Bratschi (1891–1981)	1957–1958	SP	Bern
127		Eugen Dietschi (1896–1986)	1958–1959	FDP	Basel-Stadt
128		Gaston Clottu (1912–1995)	1959–1960	LPS	Neuchâtel
129		Emil Duft (1895–1978)	1960–1961	KCVP	Zurich
130		Walther Bringolf (1895–1981)	1961–1962	SP	Schaffhausen
131		André Guinand (1901–1991)	1962–1963	FDP	Geneva
132		Otto Hess (1897–1988)	1963–1964	BGB	Thurgau
133		Franz Josef Kurmann (1917–1988)	1964–1965	KCVP	Lucerne
134		Pierre Graber (1908–2003)	1965–1966	SP	Vaud
135		Alfred Schaller (1908–1985)	1966–1967	FDP	Basel-Stadt
136		Hans Conzett (1915–1996)	1967–1968	BGB	Zurich
137		Max Aebischer (1914–2009)	1968–1969	KCVP	Fribourg
138		Mathias Eggenberger (1905–1975)	1969–1970	SP	St. Gallen
139		Alfred Weber (1923–2015)	1970–1971	FDP	Uri
140		William Vontobel (1909–1973)	1971–1972	LdU	Zurich
141		Enrico Franzoni (1920–2008)	1972–1973	KCVP	Ticino
142		Anton Muheim (1916–2016)	1973–1974	SP	Lucerne
143		Simon Kohler (1916–1990)	1974–1975	FDP	Bern
144		Rudolf Etter (1914–1982)	1975–1976	SVP	Bern
145		Hans Wyer (1927–2012)	1976–1977	CVP	Valais
146		Elisabeth Blunschy (1922–2015)	1977	CVP	Schwyz
147		Alfred Bussey (1915–1987)	1977–1978	SP	Vaud
148		Luigi Generali (1920–2005)	1978–1979	FDP	Ticino
149		Hanspeter Fischer (1930–2009)	1979–1980	SVP	Thurgau
150		Laurent Butty (1925–1990)	1980–1981	CVP	Fribourg
151		Hedi Lang (1931–2004)	1981–1982	SP	Zurich
152		Franz Eng (1928–2022)	1982–1983	FDP	Solothurn
153		André Gautier (1924–2000)	1983–1984	LPS	Geneva
154		Arnold Koller (born 1933)	1984–1985	CVP	Appenzell Innerrhoden
155		Martin Bundi (1932–2020)	1985–1986	SP	Grisons
156		Jean-Jacques Cevey (1928–2014)	1986–1987	FDP	Vaud
157		Rudolf Reichling (1924–2014)	1987–1988	SVP	Zurich
158		Joseph Iten (born 1943)	1988–1989	CVP	Nidwalden
159		Victor Ruffy (1937–2016)	1989–1990	SP	Vaud
160		Ulrich Bremi (1929–2021)	1990–1991	FDP	Zurich
161		Hans-Rudolf Nebiker (1929–2008)	1991–1992	SVP	Basel-Landschaft
162		Paul Schmidhalter (1931–2005)	1992–1993	CVP	Valais
163		Gret Haller (born 1947)	1993–1994	SP	Bern
164		Claude Frey (born 1943)	1994–1995	FDP	Neuchâtel
165		Jean-François Leuba (1934–2004)	1995–1996	LPS	Vaud
166		Judith Stamm (1934–2022)	1996–1997	CVP	Lucerne
167		Ernst Leuenberger (1945–2009)	1997–1998	SP	Solothurn
168		Trix Heberlein (born 1942)	1998–1999	FDP	Zurich
169		Hanspeter Seiler (born 1933)	1999–2000	SVP	Bern
170		Peter Hess (born 1948)	2000–2001	CVP	Zug
171		Liliane Maury Pasquier (born 1956)	2001–2002	SP	Geneva
172		Yves Christen (born 1941)	2002–2003	FDP	Vaud
173		Max Binder (born 1947)	2003–2004	SVP	Zurich
174		Jean-Philippe Maitre (1949–2006)	2004–2005	CVP	Geneva
175		Thérèse Meyer (born 1948)	2005	CVP	Fribourg
176		Claude Janiak (born 1948)	2005–2006	SP	Basel-Landschaft
177		Christine Egerszegi (born 1948)	2006–2007	FDP	Aargau
178		André Bugnon (born 1947)	2007–2008	SVP	Vaud
179		Chiara Simoneschi-Cortesi (born 1946)	2008–2009	CVP	Ticino
180		Pascale Bruderer (born 1977)	2009–2010	SP	Aargau
181		Jean-René Germanier (born 1958)	2010–2011	FDP	Valais
182		Hansjörg Walter (born 1951)	2011–2012	SVP	Thurgau
183		Maya Graf (born 1962)	2012–2013	Green	Basel-Landschaft
184		Ruedi Lustenberger (born 1950)	2013–2014	CVP	Lucerne
185		Stéphane Rossini (born 1963)	2014–2015	SP	Valais
186		Christa Markwalder (born 1975)	2015–2016	FDP	Bern
187		Jürg Stahl (born 1968)	2016–2017	SVP	Zurich
188		Dominique de Buman (born 1956)	2017–2018	CVP	Fribourg
189		Marina Carobbio Guscetti (born 1966)	2018–2019	SP	Ticino
190		Isabelle Moret (born 1970)	2019–2020	FDP	Vaud
191		Andreas Aebi (born 1958)	2020–2021	SVP	Bern
192		Irène Kälin (born 1987)	2021–2022	Green	Aargau
193		Martin Candinas (born 1980)	2022–2023	Centre	Grisons
194		Eric Nussbaumer (born 1960)	2023–2024	SP	Basel-Landschaft
195		Maja Riniker (born 1978)	2024–2025	FDP	Aargau
196		Pierre-André Page (born 1960)	2025–present	SVP	Fribourg

== Statistics by canton ==
These counts by canton do not take in account the varying number of members of the National Council per canton (in 2005: 1-34 members).

Presidencies	Cantons
28	Bern
23	Zürich
20	Vaud
15	Aargau
12	St. Gallen
10	Geneva, Neuchâtel, Thurgau
9	Lucerne
8	Basel-Stadt
7	Solothurn, Ticino, Valais
6	Grisons
4	Freiburg, Glarus, Schaffhausen, Basel-Landschaft
3	
2	Schwyz, Zug
1	Appenzell Innerrhoden, Appenzell Ausserrhoden, Nidwalden, Uri
0	Jura, Obwalden

== List of vice presidents of the National Council ==
=== Before 1999 ===
No.	Name	Term	Party	Canton
1	Alfred von Planta	1912–1913	LPS	Grisons
2	Arthur Eugster	1914–1915	FDP	Appenzell Ausserrhoden
3	Anton Büeler	1915–1916	KVP	Schwyz
4	Henri Calame	1916–1917	FDP	Neuchâtel
5	Heinrich Häberlin	1917–1918	FDP	Thurgau
6	Eduard Blumer	1918–1919	DP	Glarus
7	Evaristo Garbani-Nerini	1919–1920	FDP	Ticino
8	Emil Klöti	1920–1921	SP	Zurich
9	Johann Jenny	1921–1922	BGB	Bern
10	Raymond Evéquoz	1922–1923	KVP	Valais
11	Emil Hofmann	1924–1925	DP	Thurgau
12	Rudolf Minger	1926–1927	BGB	Bern
13	Heinrich Walther	1927–1928	KVP	Lucerne
14	Ernest-Paul Graber	1928–1929	SP	Neuchâtel
15	Hans Sträuli	1929–1930	DP	Zurich
16	Heinrich Roman Abt	1930–1931	BGB	Aargau
17	Johannes Huber	1932–1933	SP	St. Gallen
18	Hermann Schüpbach	1933–1934	FDP	Bern
19	Rudolf Reichling	1934–1935	BGB	Zurich
20	Maurice Troillet	1935–1936	KVP	Valais
21	Fritz Hauser	1936–1937	SP	Basel-Stadt
22	Henry Vallotton	1937–1938	FDP	Vaud
23	Hans Stähli	1938–1939	BGB	Bern
24	Emil Nietlispach	1939–1940	KVP	Aargau
25	Charles Rosselet	1940–1941	SP	Geneva
26	Emil Keller	1941–1942	FDP	Aargau
27	Paul Gysler	1942–1943	BGB	Zurich
28	Pierre Aeby	1943–1944	KVP	Fribourg
29	Robert Grimm	1944–1945	SP	Bern
30	Max Wey	1945–1946	FDP	Lucerne
31	Albert Picot	1946–1947	LPS	Geneva
32	Josef Escher	1947–1948	KVP	Valais
33	Jacques Schmid	1948–1949	SP	Solothurn
34	Aleardo Pini	1949–1950	FDP	Ticino
35	Karl Renold	1950–1951	BGB	Aargau
36	Thomas Holenstein	1951–1952	KVP	St. Gallen
37	Henri Perret	1952–1953	SP	Neuchâtel
38	Hermann Häberlin	1953–1954	FDP	Zurich
39	Paul Burgdorfer	1954–1955	BGB	Bern
40	Josef Condrau	1955–1956	KVP	Grisons
41	Robert Bratschi	1956–1957	SP	Bern
42	Eugen Dietschi	1957–1958	FDP	Basel-Stadt
43	Gaston Clottu	1958–1959	LPS	Neuchâtel
44	Emil Duft	1959–1960	KCVP	Zurich
45	Walther Bringolf	1960–1961	SP	Schaffhausen
46	André Guinand	1961–1962	FDP	Geneva
47	Otto Hess	1962–1963	BGB	Thurgau
48	Franz Josef Kurmann	1963–1964	KCVP	Lucerne
49	Pierre Graber	1964–1965	SP	Vaud
50	Alfred Schaller	1965–1966	FDP	Basel-Stadt
51	Hans Conzett	1966–1967	BGB	Zurich
52	Max Aebischer	1967–1968	KCVP	Fribourg
53	Mathias Eggenberger	1968–1969	SP	St. Gallen
54	Jacques Glaner	1969–1970	FDP	Glarus
55	William Vontobel	1970–1971	LdU	Zurich
56	Enrico Franzoni	1971–1972	KCVP	Ticino
57	Anton Muheim	1972–1973	SP	Lucerne
58	Simon Kohler	1973–1974	FDP	Bern
59	Rudolf Etter	1974–1975	SVP	Bern
60	Hans Wyer	1975–1976	CVP	Valais
61	Alfred Bussey	1976–1977	SP	Vaud
62	Luigi Generali	1977–1978	FDP	Ticino
63	Hanspeter Fischer	1978–1979	SVP	Thurgau
64	Laurent Butty	1979–1980	CVP	Fribourg
65	Hedi Lang	1980–1981	SP	Zurich
66	Franz Eng	1981–1982	FDP	Solothurn
67	André Gautier	1982–1983	LPS	Geneva
68	Arnold Koller	1983–1984	CVP	Appenzell Innerrhoden
69	Martin Bundi	1984–1985	SP	Grisons
70	Jean-Jacques Cevey	1985–1986	FDP	Vaud
71	Rudolf Reichling	1986–1987	SVP	Zurich
72	Joseph Iten	1987–1988	CVP	Nidwalden
73	Victor Ruffy	1988–1989	SP	Vaud
74	Ulrich Bremi	1989–1990	FDP	Zurich
75	Hans-Rudolf Nebiker	1990–1991	SVP	Basel-Landschaft
76	Paul Schmidhalter	1991–1992	CVP	Valais
77	Gret Haller	1992–1993	SP	Bern
78	Claude Frey	1993–1994	FDP	Neuchâtel
79	Jean-François Leuba	1994–1995	LPS	Vaud
80	Judith Stamm	1995–1996	CVP	Lucerne
81	Ernst Leuenberger	1996–1997	SP	Solothurn
82	Trix Heberlein	1997–1998	FDP	Zurich
83	Hanspeter Seiler	1998–1999	SVP	Bern

=== Since 1999 ===
First Vice President				Second Vice President				Term
No.	Name	Party	Canton	No.	Name	Party	Canton	Term
84	Peter Hess	CVP	ZG	85	Liliane Maury Pasquier	SP	GE	1999–2000
(85)	Liliane Maury Pasquier	SP	GE	86	Yves Christen	FDP	VD	2000–2001
(86)	Yves Christen	FDP	VD	87	Max Binder	SVP	ZH	2001–2002
(87)	Max Binder	SVP	ZH	88	Jean-Philippe Maitre	CVP	GE	2002–2003
(88)	Jean-Philippe Maitre	CVP	GE	89	Claude Janiak	SP	BL	2003–2004
(89)	Claude Janiak	SP	BL	90	Christine Egerszegi	FDP	AG	2004–2005
(90)	Christine Egerszegi	FDP	AG	91	André Bugnon	SVP	VD	2005–2006
(91)	André Bugnon	SVP	VD	92	Chiara Simoneschi-Cortesi	CVP	TI	2006–2007
(92)	Chiara Simoneschi-Cortesi	CVP	TI	93	Pascale Bruderer	SP	AG	2007–2008
(93)	Pascale Bruderer	SP	AG	94	Jean-René Germanier	FDP	VS	2008–2009
(94)	Jean-René Germanier	FDP	VS	95	Hansjörg Walter	SVP	TG	2009–2010
(95)	Hansjörg Walter	SVP	TG	96	Maya Graf	Green	BL	2010–2011
(96)	Maya Graf	Green	BL	97	Ruedi Lustenberger	CVP	LU	2011–2012
(97)	Ruedi Lustenberger	CVP	LU	98	Stéphane Rossini	SP	VS	2012–2013
(98)	Stéphane Rossini	SP	VS	99	Christa Markwalder	FDP	BE	2013–2014
(99)	Christa Markwalder	FDP	BE	100	Jürg Stahl	SVP	ZH	2014–2015
(100)	Jürg Stahl	SVP	ZH	101	Dominique de Buman	CVP	FR	2015–2016
(101)	Dominique de Buman	CVP	FR	102	Marina Carobbio Guscetti	SP	TI	2016–2017
(102)	Marina Carobbio Guscetti	SP	TI	103	Isabelle Moret	FDP	VD	2017–2018
(103)	Isabelle Moret	FDP	VD	104	Heinz Brand	SVP	GR	2018–2019
105	Andreas Aebi	SVP	BE	106	Irène Kälin	Green	AG	2019–2020
(106)	Irène Kälin	Green	AG	107	Martin Candinas	CVP	GR	2020–2021
(107)	Martin Candinas	Centre	GR	108	Eric Nussbaumer	SP	BL	2021–2022
(108)	Eric Nussbaumer	SP	BL	109	Maja Riniker	FDP	AG	2022–2023
(109)	Maja Riniker	FDP	AG	110	Pierre-André Page	SVP	FR	2023–2024
(110)	Pierre-André Page	SVP	FR	111	Katja Christ	GLP	BS	2024–2025
(111)	Katja Christ	GLP	BS	112	Farah Rumy	SP	SO	2025–present

== See also ==
- National Council (Switzerland)
- Presidents of the Council of States
- Presidents of the Confederation
- Members of the Swiss National Council
