= 1884 Swiss federal election =

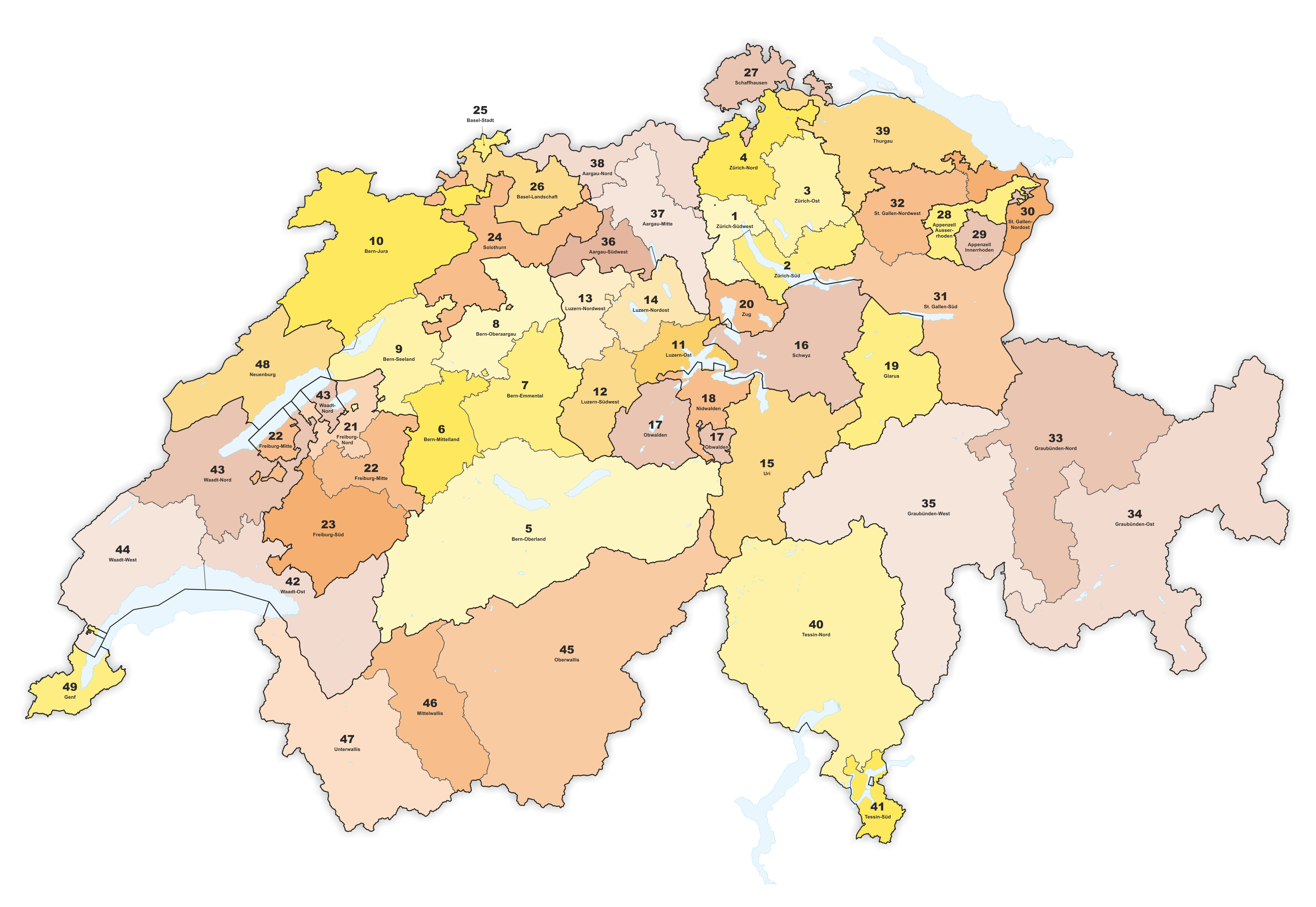
The 49 electoral districts

Federal elections were held in Switzerland on 26 October 1884. The Radical Left retained its majority in the National Council.

== Electoral system ==
The 145 members of the National Council were elected in 49 single- and multi-member constituencies using a three-round system. Candidates had to receive a majority in the first or second round to be elected; if it went to a third round, only a plurality was required. Voters could cast as many votes as there were seats in their constituency. There was one seat for every 20,000 citizens, with seats allocated to cantons in proportion to their population.

== Results ==
=== National Council ===
Voter turnout was highest in Schaffhausen (where voting was compulsory) at 95.9% and lowest in Neuchâtel at 25.1%.

Party	Votes	%	Seats	+/–
Radical Left		42.0	74	–1
Catholic Right		25.7	37	+2
Liberal Centre		16.8	18	–4
Democratic Group		8.2	15	+5
Evangelical Right		6.2	1	–2
Socialists		0.2	0	New
Independents		0.9	0	0
Total			145	0
Total votes	404,028	–		
Registered voters/turnout	640,262	63.10		
Source: BFS (seats)

==== By constituency ====
Constituency	Seats	Party	Seats won	Elected members
Zürich 1	5	Liberal Centre	4	Melchior Römer; Konrad Cramer; Wilhelm Hertenstein; Ulrich Meister Jr.
Zürich 1	5	Democratic Group	1	Arnold Syfrig
Zürich 2	4	Liberal Centre	3	Heinrich Landis; Johann Heinrich Bühler; Jakob Brennwald
Zürich 2	4	Democratic Group	1	Johann Jakob Keller
Zürich 3	4	Democratic Group	4	Rudolf Geilinger; Johannes Stössel; Friedrich Salomon Vögelin; Ludwig Forrer
Zürich 4	3	Democratic Group	3	Friedrich Scheuchzer; Johannes Moser; Johann Jakob Sulzer
Bern 5	5	Radical Left	5	Matthäus Zurbuchen; Johann Jakob Rebmann; Johann Zürcher; Jakob Scherz; Carl Samuel Zyro
Bern 6	5	Radical Left	5	Johann Jakob Hauser; Rudolf Brunner; Rudolf Rohr; Karl Stämpfli; Eduard Müller
Bern 7	4	Radical Left	4	Gottlieb Riem; Fritz Bühlmann; Karl Schenk; Karl Karrer
Bern 8	4	Radical Left	4	Johann Bützberger; Johann Friedrich Gugelmann; Andreas Schmid; Rudolf Leuenberger
Bern 9	4	Radical Left	4	Johannes Schlup; Eduard Marti; Rudolf Niggeler; Charles Kuhn
Bern 10	5	Radical Left	5	Joseph Stockmar; Henri Cuenat; Ernest Francillon; Pierre Jolissaint; Auguste-Adolphe Klaye
Lucerne 11	2	Radical Left	2	Josef Vonmatt; Friedrich Wüest
Lucerne 12	1	Catholic Right	1	Josef Zemp
Lucerne 13	2	Catholic Right	2	Josef Erni; Candid Hochstrasser
Lucerne 14	2	Catholic Right	2	Philipp Anton von Segesser; Franz Xaver Beck
Uri 15	1	Catholic Right	1	Josef Arnold
Schwyz 16	3	Catholic Right	3	Nikolaus Benziger; Vital Schwander Sr.; Fridolin Holdener
Obwalden 17	1	Catholic Right	1	Nicolaus Hermann
Nidwalden 18	1	Catholic Right	1	Robert Durrer
Glarus 19	2	Liberal Centre	1	Charles Mercier
Glarus 19	2	Democratic Group	1	Kaspar Schindler
Zug 20	1	Catholic Right	1	Theodor Keiser
Fribourg 21	2	Catholic Right	2	Georges Cressier; Georges Python
Fribourg 22	2	Catholic Right	2	Paul Aeby; Louis de Wuilleret
Fribourg 23	2	Catholic Right	2	Louis Grand; Alphonse Théraulaz
Solothurn 24	4	Radical Left	4	Bernhard Hammer; Simon Kaiser; Urs Schild; Albert Brosi
Basel-Stadt 25	3	Radical Left	2	Wilhelm Klein; Karl Burckhardt-Iselin
Basel-Stadt 25	3	Liberal Centre	1	Johann Rudolf Geigy-Merian
Basel-Landschaft 26	3	Radical Left	3	Jakob Bernhard Graf; Gédéon Thommen; Ambrosius Rosenmund
Schaffhausen 27	2	Radical Left	1	Robert Grieshaber
Schaffhausen 27	2	Democratic Group	1	Wilhelm Joos
Appenzell Ausserrhoden 28	3	Liberal Centre	1	Johann Jakob Sturzenegger; Johann Ulrich Eisenhut
Appenzell Ausserrhoden 28	3	Radical Left	1	Johann Conrad Sonderegger
Appenzell Innerhoden 29	1	Liberal Centre	1	Karl Justin Sonderegger
St. Gallen 30	4	Democratic Group	2	Roderich Albert Kunkler; Adolf Grubenmann
St. Gallen 30	4	Catholic Right	1	Johann Gebhard Lutz
St. Gallen 30	4	Evangelical Right	1	Christoph Tobler
St. Gallen 31	3	Catholic Right	1	Wilhelm Good
St. Gallen 31	3	Radical Left	1	Gallus August Suter
St. Gallen 31	3	Democratic Group	1	Carl Theodor Curti
St. Gallen 32	3	Catholic Right	3	Johann Fridolin Müller; Johann Joseph Keel; Laurenz Schönenberger
Grisons 33	2	Liberal Centre	1	Peter Theophil Bühler
Grisons 33	2	Radical Left	1	Luzius Raschein
Grisons 34	2	Catholic Right	2	Caspar Decurtins; Johann Schmid
Grisons 35	1	Radical Left	1	Andrea Bezzola
Aargau 36	3	Radical Left	3	Arnold Künzli; Erwin Kurz; Ludwig Karrer
Aargau 37	4	Radical Left	2	Hans Riniker; Theodor Haller
Aargau 37	4	Liberal Centre	2	Johann Rohr; Peter Emil Isler
Aargau 38	3	Liberal Centre	2	Emil Welti; Emil Albert Baldinger
Aargau 38	3	Catholic Right	1	Arnold Münch
Thurgau 39	5	Radical Left	4	Friedrich Heinrich Häberlin; Johann Philipp Heitz; Gustav Merkle; Adolf Deucher
Thurgau 39	5	Liberal Centre	1	Jakob Huldreich Bachmann
Ticino 40	2	Radical Left	2	Carlo Battaglini; Costantino Bernasconi
Ticino 41	5	Catholic Right	5	Martino Pedrazzini; Ignazio Polar; Giovanni Dazzoni; Carlo Vonmentlen; Agostino Gatti
Vaud 42	5	Radical Left	5	Louis Ruchonnet; Louis Mayor; Eugène Ruffy; Louis Paschoud; Louis Chausson
Vaud 43	4	Radical Left	4	Jacques-François Viquerat; Louis Déglon; Frédéric Criblet; Donat Golaz
Vaud 44	3	Radical Left	3	Adrien Thélin; Charles Baud; Jules Colomb
Valais 45	2	Catholic Right	2	Hans Anton von Roten; Victor de Chastonay
Valais 46	1	Catholic Right	1	Maurice Evéquoz
Valais 47	2	Catholic Right	2	Charles de Werra; Fidèle Joris
Neuchâtel 48	5	Radical Left	5	Numa Droz; Charles-Émile Tissot; Henri Morel; Robert Comtesse; Arnold Grosjean
Geneva 49	5	Radical Left	3	Antoine Carteret; Adrien Lachenal; Georges Favon
Geneva 49	5	Liberal Centre	2	Jean-Étienne Dufour; Gustave-Jules Pictet
Source: Gruner

=== Council of States ===
Party	Seats	+/–
Catholic Right	18	0
Radical Left	17	0
Liberal Centre	4	0
Democratic Group	3	0
Evangelical Right	1	0
Independents	1	0
Total	44	0
Source: Federal Assembly
