= Maya Graf =

Swiss politician

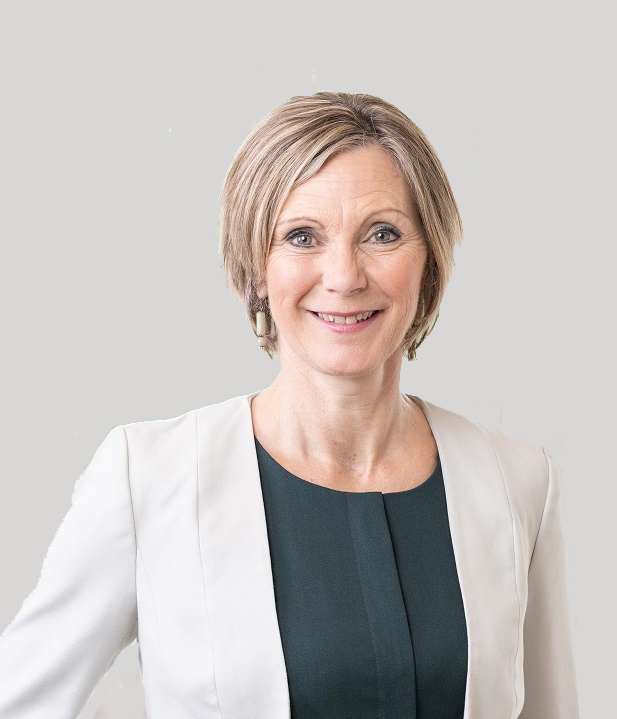

Member of the Council of States
- Incumbent
- Assumed office 4 December 2019
- Preceded by: Claude Janiak

Member of the National Council of Switzerland
- In office 5 June 2001 – 3 December 2019
- Succeeded by: Florence Brenzikofer

President of the National Council
- In office 26 November 2012 – 25 November 2013
- Preceded by: Hansjörg Walter
- Succeeded by: Ruedi Lustenberger

Personal details
- Born: 28 February 1962 (age 63) Sissach, Switzerland
- Party: Green Party of Switzerland

Maya Graf (born 28 February 1962) is a Swiss politician. She is a member of the Council of States from the Canton of Basel-Landschaft. From 2001 to 2019, she was a member of the National Council of Switzerland. From 2012 to 2013, she was the president of the council, the first member of the Green Party to hold that seat.

Graf was first elected to the National Council in 2001 and has been re-elected ever since. She was elected President of the National Council in 2012 with 173 out of 189 delegates voting in her favour.

== Personal life ==
Graf is married and has two children. She is the daughter of former SVP politician Fritz Graf. Graf was as a social worker before she started to run an organic farm together with her brother.

Preceded by Hansjörg Walter	President of the National Council; 2012–2013	Succeeded by Ruedi Lustenberger
