= Jean-François Leuba =

Swiss lawyer and jurist

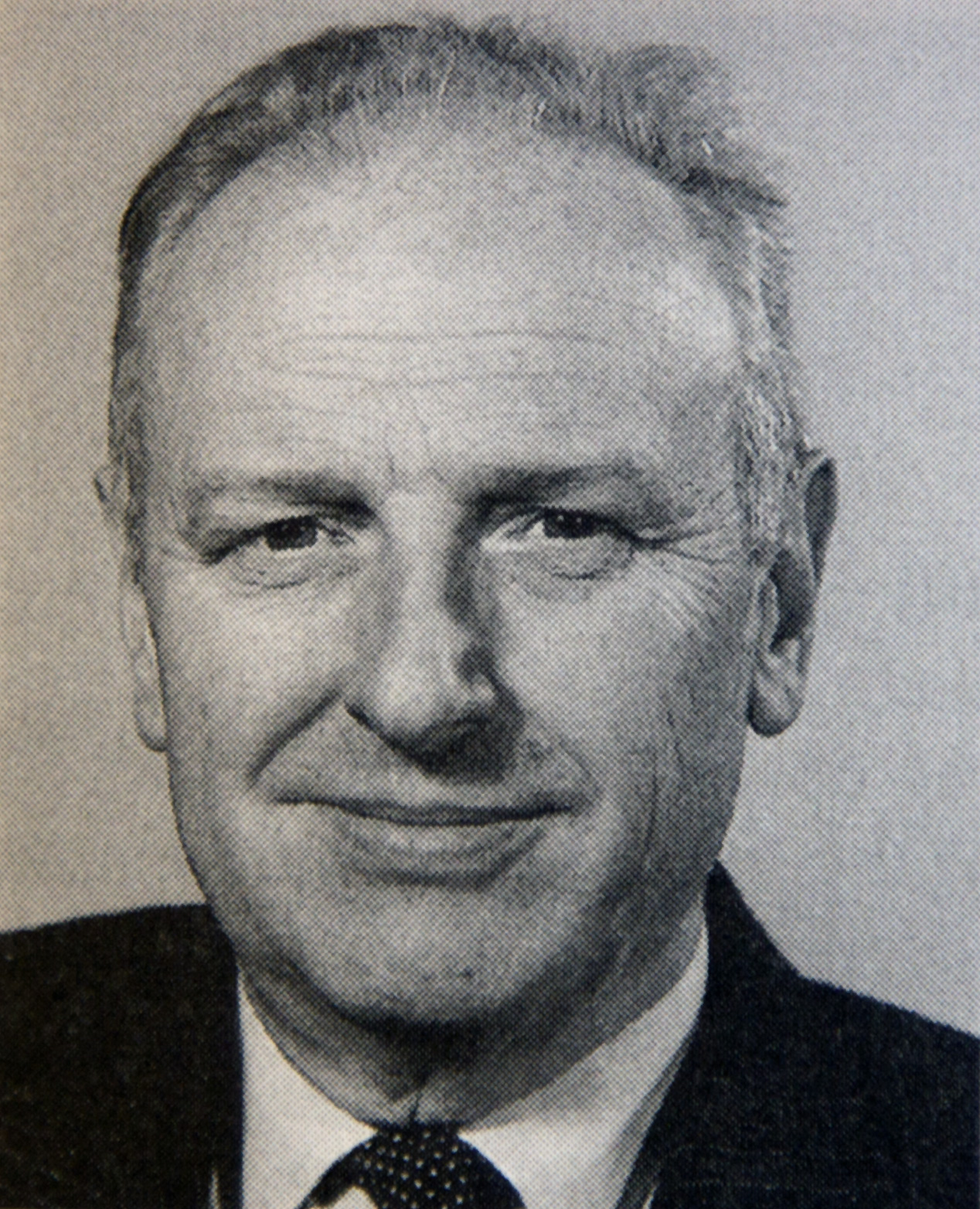

Jean-François Leuba (16 July 1934 – 22 October 2004) was a Swiss lawyer and jurist. He belonged to the Liberal Party of Switzerland and served as President of the National Council of Switzerland in 1995/1996.

Preceded by Claude Frey	President of the Swiss National Council; 1995/1996	Succeeded by Judith Stamm
