= Simon Kaiser =

Simon Kaiser may refer to:

- Simon Kaiser (politician)
- Simon Kaiser (biathlete)
