= Eugster =

Eugster may refer to:

- 5664 Eugster, a Main-belt Asteroid
- Eugster/Frismag, a Swiss producer of home appliances

== People with the surname ==
- Al Eugster (1909–1997), American animator, writer, and film director
- Arthur Eugster (1863–1922), Swiss politician of Appenzell Ausserrhoden
- Arthur Eugster (Scouting)
- Basil Eugster (1914–1984), Commander in Chief, UK Land Forces
- Hans Eugster (1929–1956), Swiss gymnast and Olympic Champion
- Hans P. Eugster (1925–1987), Swiss-American geochemist
