= Anton Muheim =

Swiss politician

Anton Muheim

Anton Muheim (13 June 1916 – 11 May 2016) was a Swiss Social Democratic politician.

== Personal life ==
Muheim was born and raised in Lucerne, the son of an inspector at the Lake Lucerne Navigation Company. He studied law and economics, leading his own law practice and receiving a doctorate in economics.

== Politics ==
He served on the Cantonal Council of Lucerne from 1959 until 1978. He served concurrently on the National Council from 1963 until 1983, serving as its President in 1973 and 1974.

Preceded by Enrico Franzoni	President of the Swiss National Council; 1973/1974	Succeeded by Simon Kohler
