= Hanspeter Seiler =

Swiss politician

Personal details
- Born: 9 September 1933 (age 91); Grindelwald, Switzerland

Hanspeter Seiler (born September 9, 1933) is a former Swiss politician and President of the National Council (1999–2000). He sat on the national council from 1987 to 2000.

Preceded by Trix Heberlein	President of the National Council; 1999–2000	Succeeded by Peter Hess
