= Ruedi Lustenberger =

Swiss politician

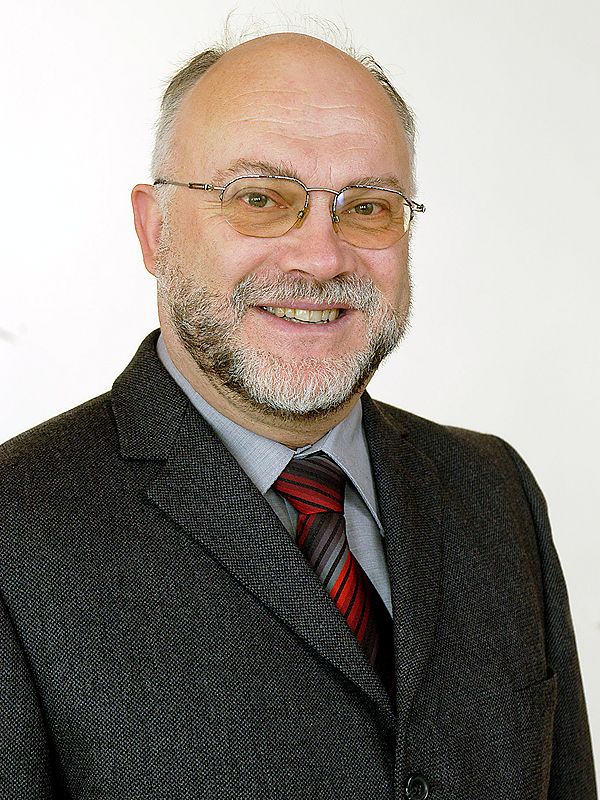

Personal details
- Born: 2 April 1950 (age 75) Romoos, Switzerland
- Party: Christian Democratic People's Party

Ruedi Lustenberger (born 2 April 1950) is a Swiss politician and President of the Swiss National Council for 2013–2014.

Lustenberger was elected to the National Council in 1999, on the list of the Christian Democratic People's Party (CVP/PDC) in the Canton of Lucerne.

Lustenberger is a carpenter and contractor. He is married and has five children.

| Preceded by Maya Graf | President of the National Council; 2013–2014 | Succeeded by Stéphane Rossini |
