= Christa Markwalder =

Swiss politician (born 1975)

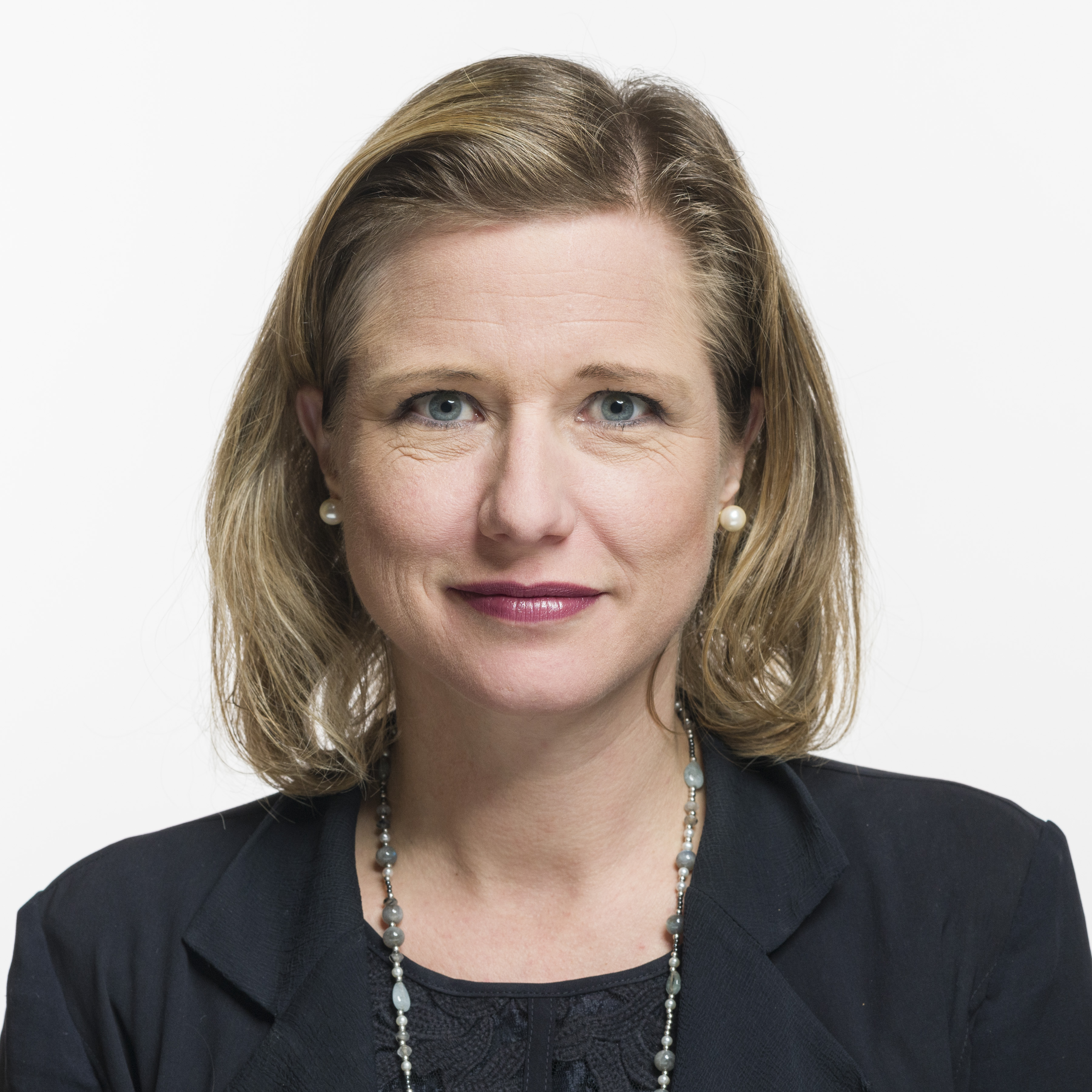

Personal details
- Born: 27 July 1975 (age 51) Burgdorf, Switzerland
- Party: FDP.The Liberals
- Education: University of Bern

Christa Markwalder (born 27 July 1975) is a Swiss politician and former President of the National Council.

Markwalder studied jurisprudence and ecology at the University of Bern. She then worked as an assistant at the Institute for European and International Economic Law at the University of Bern. Since January 2008 she has been working as a lawyer for Zurich Financial Services.

== Politics ==
Markwalder joined the Young Liberals and sat in the city council of Burgdorf between 1999 and 2002. In 2002, she was elected to the Grand Council of Berne while her father, Hans-Rudolf Markwalder, conceded defeat in the same elections. In 2003, Markwalder resigned from the Grand Council as she was elected to the National Council, and her father assumed her vacant Grand Council seat. Markwalder was re-elected to the National Council in 2007, 2011 and 2015.

After the election of Simonetta Sommaruga to the Federal Council, Markwalder ran for the vacant Bernese seat in the Council of States in February 2011. She finished in third place in the first round and subsequently decided to withdraw from the race.

Markwalder was elected President of the National Council on 30 November 2015.

Preceded by Stéphane Rossini	President of the National Council; 2015–2016	Succeeded by Jürg Stahl
