= Louis Ruchonnet =

19th-century Swiss attorney and politician

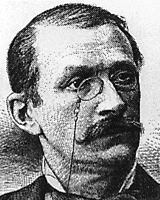
- Born: Antoine Louis John Ruchonnet; 28 April 1834; Lausanne, Vaud, Switzerland
- Died: 14 September 1893 (aged 59); Bern, Bern, Switzerland
- Resting place: Bois-de-Vaux Cemetery, Lausanne; 46.5237°N 6.5936°E
- Monuments: Musée des Beaux-Arts, Lausanne (portrait); Old Town of Lausanne (bronze statue)
- Education: Univ. of Lausanne, 1856 (MLaw)
- Occupation: Patent attorney
- Years active: 1859 – 1893
- Office: President of the Swiss Confederation
- Term: 1883, 1890
- Predecessor: Simeon Bavier, Bernhard Hammer
- Successor: Emil Welti
- Political party: Free Democratic Party of Switzerland
- Parents: François-Louis Ruchonnet (father); Susanne Boomer (mother)
- Awards: Doctorate (honorary), University of Bern (1886)

Antoine Louis John Ruchonnet (French pronunciation: [lwi ʁyʃɔnɛ]; 28 April 1834 – 14 September 1893) was a 19th-century Swiss attorney and politician. In 1864, he founded the Vaud Credit Union (French: l'Union vaudoise de crédit). After his election to the Federal Council in 1875, he declined to take his seat; he was elected again in 1881, this time taking office and sitting until his death in 1893.

== Public service ==
He was first elected to public service as a deputy to the Grand Council of Vaud in 1863, then twice to the Lausanne Communal Council (1866–1868, 1878–1881). On 10 December 1875 he was elected to the Swiss Federal Council for the canton of Vaud but declined to serve. He was elected again as Federal Counsellor on 3 March 1881 and this time accepted the position and died still in office on 14 September 1893. He served twice as President of the Confederation, first in 1883 and again in 1890. He was a unifying figure, along with his successor as Federal Counsellor for Vaud, Eugène Ruffy, in the Free Democratic Party of Switzerland.

During his time in office he was responsible for the following federal administrative departments:

- Trade and Agriculture (since renamed Economic Affairs, Education and Research) - 1881
- Foreign Affairs - 1883
- Justice and Police - 1882, 1884–1893

== Freemasonry ==
Ruchonnet was elected to serve as the first Master of Liberty Masonic Lodge (French: Loge Maçonnique Liberté à l'Orient de Lausanne) in Lausanne when it was chartered on 11 September 1871.

== Likenesses and namesakes ==
Avenue Louis-Ruchonnet in Lausanne is named after him and a bronze statue of him stands in the Old Town of Lausanne, erected in 1906. There is also an 1888 portrait of him by Adolfo Müller-Ury (1862–1947) in the Musee des Beaux-Arts in Lausanne, gifted by his son Ernest in 1894.

Political offices
Preceded by Simon Kaiser	President of the Swiss National Council; 1869	Succeeded by Joachim Heer
Preceded by Carl Feer-Herzog	President of the Swiss National Council; 1874/1875	Succeeded by Jakob Stämpfli
Preceded by Fridolin Anderwert	Member of the Swiss Federal Council; 1881–1893	Succeeded by Eugène Ruffy
