= Evaristo Garbani-Nerini =

Swiss politician

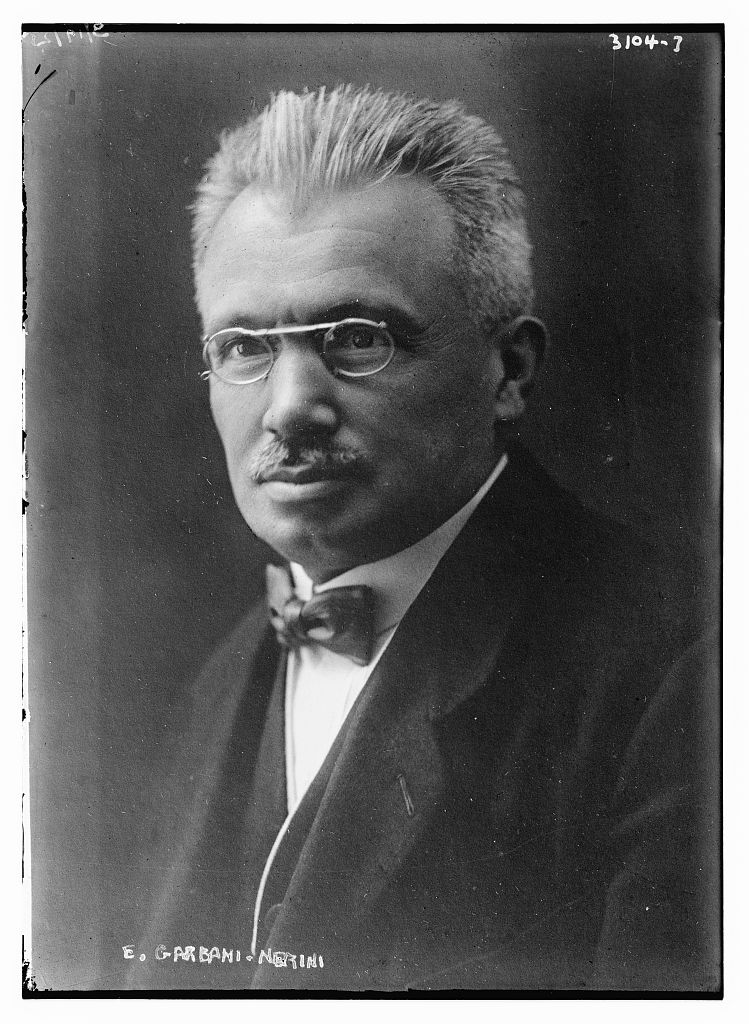

Evaristo Garbani-Nerini (26 October 1867 – 16 February 1944) was a Swiss politician and president of the Swiss National Council (1920/1921).

Preceded by Eduard Blumer	President of the National Council; 1920/1921	Succeeded by Emil Klöti
