= Stéphane Rossini =

Swiss politician

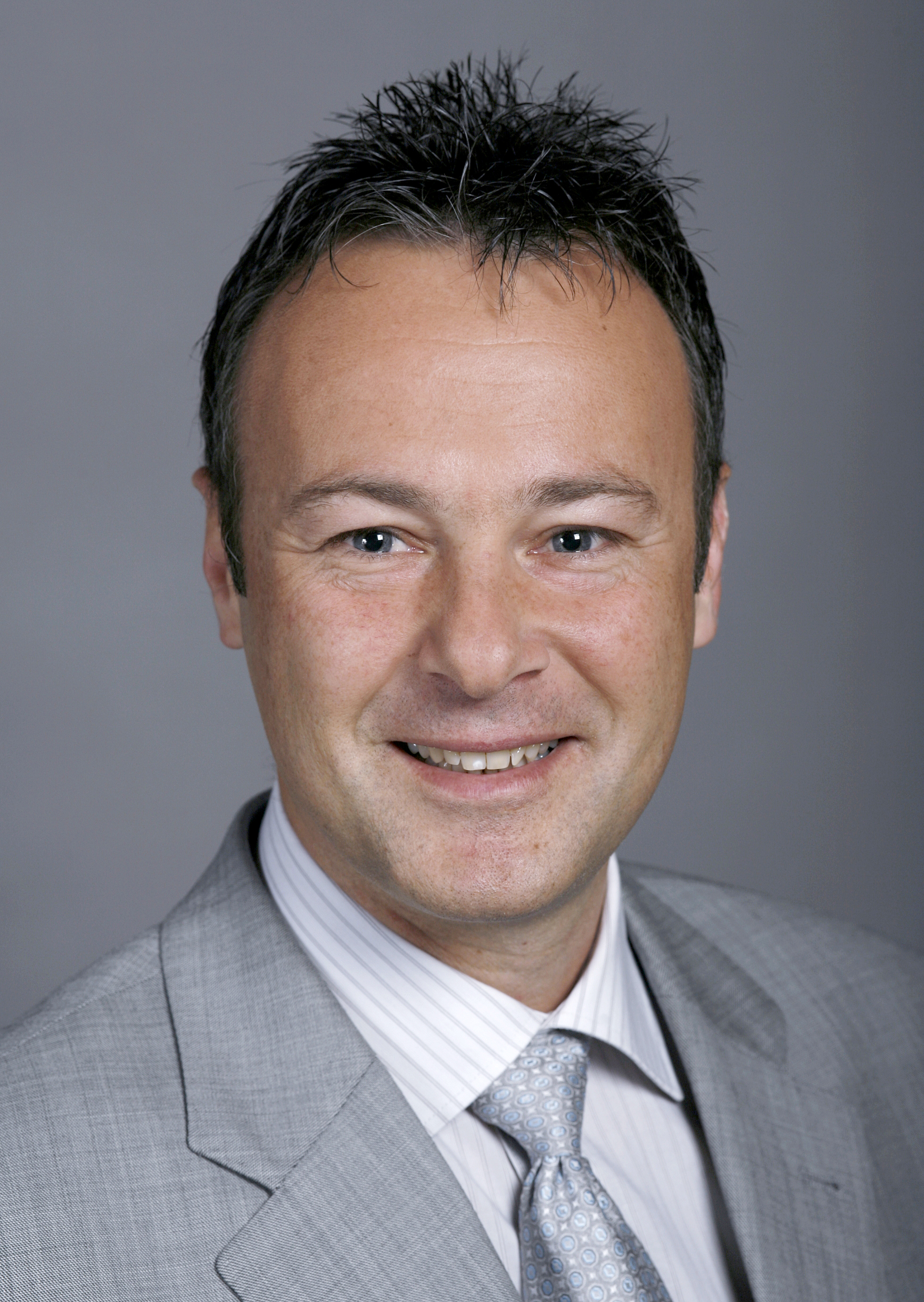

Personal details
- Born: 9 August 1963 (age 63) Sion, Switzerland
- Party: Social Democratic Party
- Education: University of Lausanne

Stéphane Rossini (born 9 August 1963 in Sion, Switzerland) is a Swiss politician and the former vice President of the Social Democratic Party of Switzerland (2008–2012).

Rossini sat on the Grand Council of Valais between 1993 and 1999. He was elected to the National Council for the first time in 1999 and reelected in 2003, 2007 and 2011.

In 2011, Rossini announced his candidacy to replace Micheline Calmy-Rey in the Swiss Federal Council, but was ultimately not nominated by his party.

In 2014, Rossini was elected as President of the National Council. Towards the end of his one-year term as President, Rossini announced he would not seek another term in the National Council. In 2016, Rossini considered running for the Conseil d'État of the canton of Valais but ultimately decided against it.

Rossini studied political science at the University of Lausanne and obtained a doctor's degree in 1995. He is a professor at the Universities of Geneva and Neuchâtel and was elected to succeed Christine Beerli as president of the agency council of Swissmedic in 2017.

Preceded by Ruedi Lustenberger	President of the National Council; 2014–2015	Succeeded by Christa Markwalder
