= Paul Schmidhalter =

Swiss politician

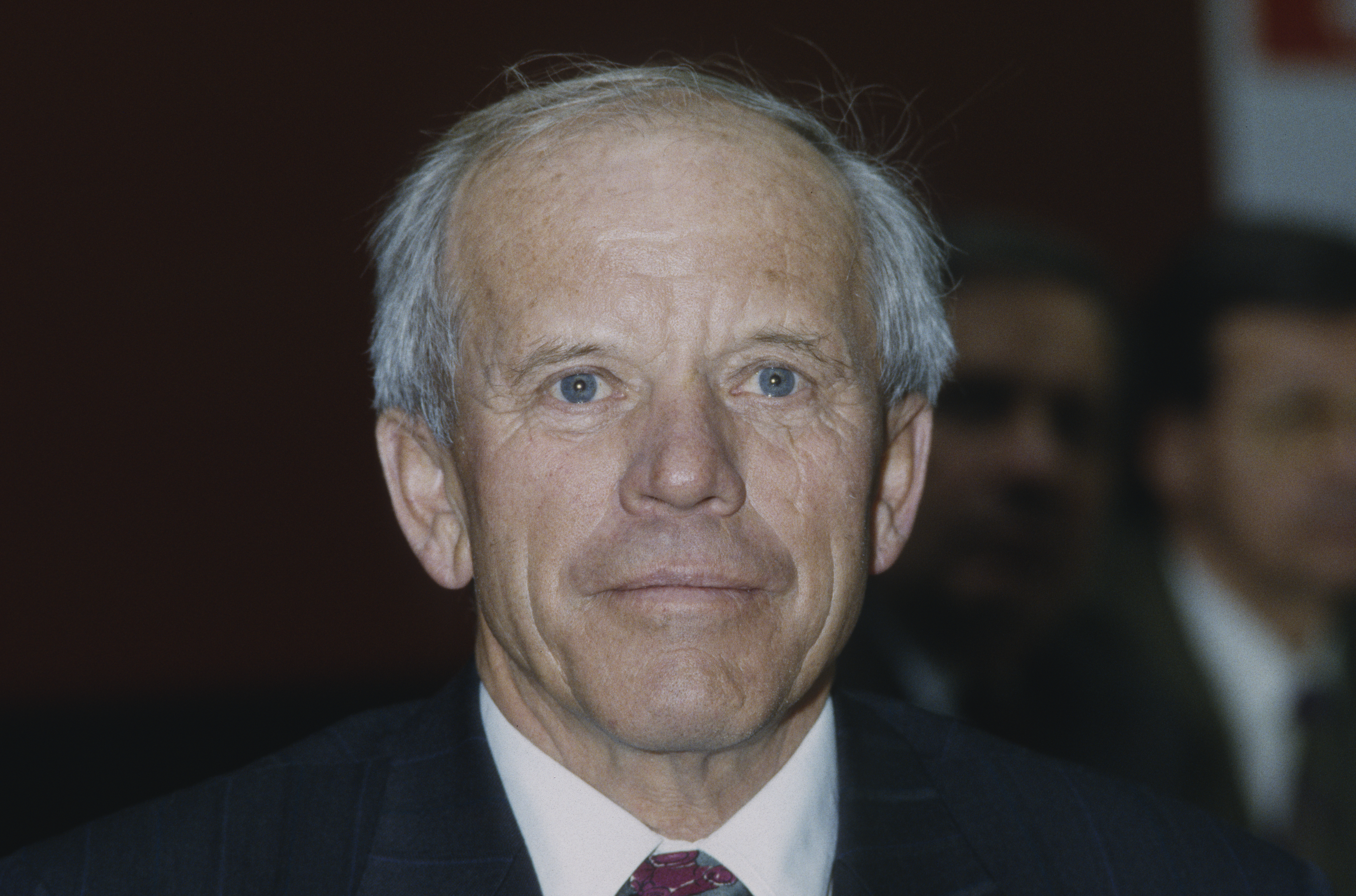

Member of the National Council of Switzerland
- In office 28 November 1983 – 3 December 1995
- Constituency: Canton of Valais

President of the National Council
- In office 30 November 1992 – 29 November 1993
- Preceded by: Hans-Rudolf Nebiker
- Succeeded by: Gret Haller

Personal details
- Born: 12 January 1931; Brig, Switzerland
- Died: 23 August 2005 (aged 74); Montana, Switzerland
- Political party: Christian Democratic People's Party of Switzerland

Paul Schmidhalter (1 December 1931 – 23 August 2005) was a Swiss politician. He was a member of the National Council of Switzerland from 1983 to 1995 and served as the President of the National Council from 1992 to 1993. He was a member of the Christian Democratic People's Party of Switzerland.

== Biography ==
Paul Schmidhalter was born in the town of Brig, Switzerland, now part of the municipality of Brig-Glis in the Canton of Valais, on 1 December 1931 to Leopold and Olga Schmidhalter. After he finished high school, he studied engineering at ETH Zurich, the Swiss Federal Institute of Technology. He operated his own civil engineering practice for a number of years.

In 1973, he was elected to the city council of Brig and the Grand Council of Valais. He held his city council seat until 1983 and his deal in the Grand Council until 1985. In 1983, he was elected to the National Council from Valais. In 1992, he was selected to the council presidency. After his one-year term ended, he continued to serve for two more years. He did not run for re-election in 2005.

Schmidhalter died on 23 August 2005 in the town of Montana, Switzerland from cancer.

Preceded by Hans-Rudolf Nebiker	President of the Swiss National Council; 1992/1993	Succeeded by Gret Haller
