= Martin Bundi =

Swiss politician and historian (1932–2020)

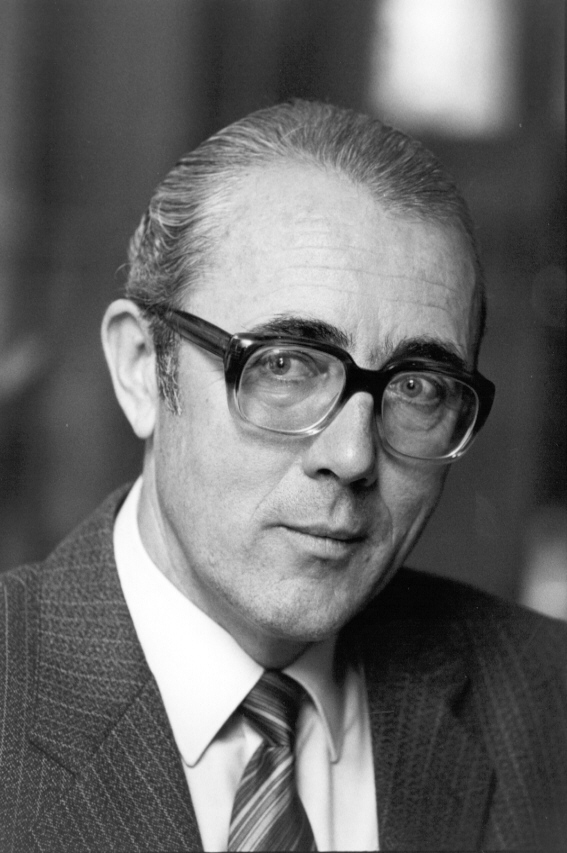

Member of the National Council of Switzerland
- In office 1 December 1975 – 3 December 1995

President of the National Council
- In office 2 December 1985 – 1 December 1986
- Preceded by: Arnold Koller
- Succeeded by: Jean-Jacques Cevey

Personal details
- Born: 19 October 1932 Sagogn, Switzerland
- Died: 1 January 2020 (aged 87) Chur, Switzerland
- Party: Social Democratic Party

Martin Bundi (19 October 1932 – 1 January 2020) was a Swiss historian and politician. He was a member of the Swiss National Council from 1975 to 1995 and was the chamber’s President in 1985 and 1986. He was a native of the Canton of Grisons and a longtime member of the Social Democratic Party.

Prior to his political career, he was a teacher who conducted research of the history of Grisons and the Rhaetian Alps. He was also active in the preservation of the Rhaeto-Romance language.

== Biography ==
Bundi was born in Sagogn in the Canton of Grisons on 19 October 1932. He earned a doctorate at the University of Zürich in 1963 and became a teacher at the Graubünden Teacher Training College in Chur. He became the deputy director of the college in 1967.

In 1972, Bundi was elected to the municipal council of Chur where he served until 1975.

In the 1975 Swiss federal election, Bundi was elected to the National Council. While on the council, he was on the committee for science and research, the military committee and the foreign policy committee. He was a supporter of the Romansh language and worked to upgrade its status in the Swiss Federal Constitution.

In 1991, Bundi became the President of the Federal National Park Commission and was the chairman of Renania, a society dedicated to Rhaeto-Romance.

Bundi was married with five children. He died on 1 January 2020 at the age of 87.
