= Andreas Aebi =

Swiss politician (born 1958)

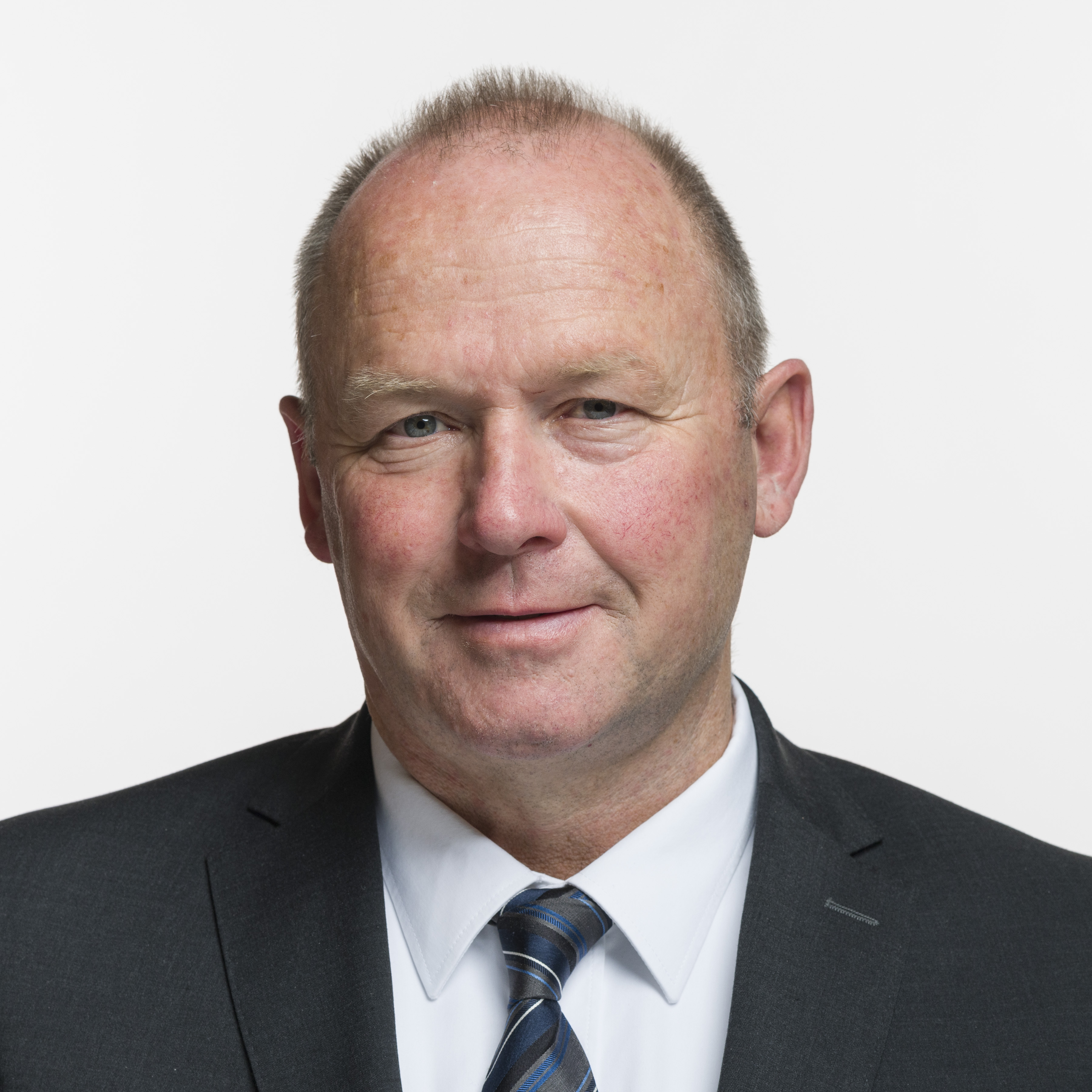

President of the National Council
- In office 30 November 2020 – 29 November 2021
- Preceded by: Isabelle Moret
- Succeeded by: Irène Kälin

First Vice President of the National Council
- In office 2 December 2019 – 30 November 2020
- Preceded by: Isabelle Moret
- Succeeded by: Irène Kälin

Member of the National Council
- Incumbent
- Assumed office 3 December 2007
- Constituency: Bern

Personal details
- Born: 26 November 1958 (age 67) Burgdorf, Switzerland
- Party: Swiss People's Party
- Profession: Farmer

Andreas Aebi (born 26 November 1958) is a Swiss politician who was the President of the National Council from 2020 to 2021. A member of the Swiss People's Party (SVP/UDC), he was first elected to the National Council in 2007. Aebi was First Vice President of the National Council for the 2019–2020 session under the presidency of Isabelle Moret.

== Biography ==
Aebi was born in Burgdorf, in the Emmental region of the Canton of Bern. He is a farmer by profession and also works as an auctioneer.

From 1999 to 2020, he was on the board of the Arbeitsgemeinschaft Schweizerischer Rinderzüchter, the Association of Cattle Breeders. He led the association from 2014 to 2020. In 2018, he joined the board of directors of Lüthi & Portmann Fleischwaren AG, one of the largest meat processors in Switzerland.

He entered politics in 1998 as the president of the municipality of Alchenstorf. In 2007, he was elected to the National Council as a member of the Swiss People’s Party. In the National Council, he has been on the Committee for Foreign Affairs and the delegation to the Organization for Security and Co-operation in Europe.

In 2008, the Bern SVP nominated for a seat on the Federal Council to succeed Samuel Schmid, who resigned. At the time, he was not viewed as a serious contender, but was placed into nomination as a representative of agricultural interests in the party. The Federal Council seat ultimately went to Ueli Maurer, the former SVP chairman.

In 2007, left his role as a municipal executive and became the SVP party president the following year.

In the 2019 election, Heinz Brand, the council’s Second Vice President, was defeated for re-election. As Second Vice President, he would have been the successor to Isabelle Moret as First Vice President upon her election as National Council President. To replace Brand in the role, the SVP nominated Aebi over Thomas Hurter and Christian Imark. The National Council elected him to the post with 187 of 191 votes. Aebi is now first in line to become the National Council President in 2020.
