= Johann Jakob Stehlin =

Swiss politician (1803–1879)

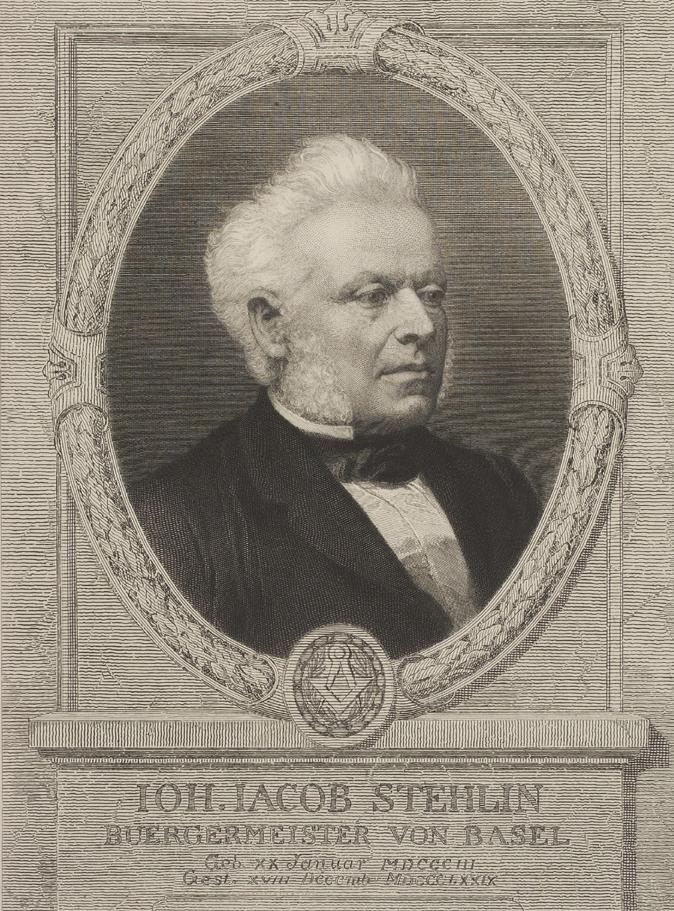
Johann Jakob Stehlin.

Johann Jakob Stehlin (20 January 1803 – 18 December 1879) was a Swiss politician of the Free Democratic Party.

Born in Basel, Stehlin was mayor of that city from 1858 to 1868. He also represented the canton Basel-City in the National Council, which he presided over in 1858/59 and 1867/68, and in the Council of States.

On 11 July 1855, Stehlin was elected to the Swiss Federal Council to succeed the deceased Josef Munzinger. The next day, he declined the election, becoming the first of five Councillor-elects (as of 2020) to do so. Josef Martin Knüsel was elected in his place on 14 July.

Two of Stehlin's sons also acquired renown: Karl Rudolf Stehlin, also a member of the Council of States, and Johann Jakob Stehlin junior, a noted architect.

Preceded by Augustin Keller	President of the National Council; 1858/1859	Succeeded by Friedrich Peyer im Hof
Preceded by Jules Philippin	President of the National Council; 1867/1868	Succeeded by Simon Kaiser
