= Joachim Heer =

Swiss politician (1825–1879)

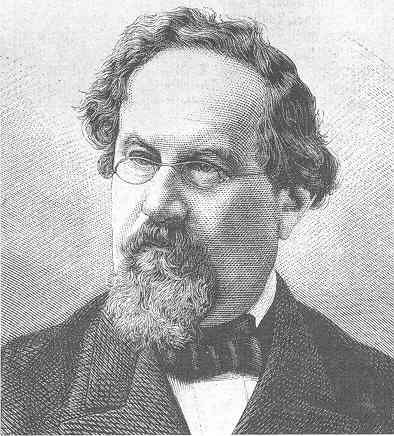
Joachim Heer

Joachim Heer (25 September 1825 – 1 March 1879) was a Swiss politician and member of the Swiss Federal Council (1875–1878).

He was elected to the Swiss Federal Council on 10 December 1875 and handed over office on 31 December 1878. He was affiliated to the Liberal Centre, which later evolved into the Liberal Party of Switzerland. During his office time he held the following departments:

- Department of Posts and Telegraph (1876)
- Political Department (1877)
- Department of Railway and Trade (1878)

He was President of the Confederation in 1877.

Dr. Joachim-Heer-Strasse in Glarus is named for him.

Political offices
Preceded by Alfred Escher	President of the National Council; 1863	Succeeded by Victor Ruffy
Preceded by Louis Ruchonnet	President of the National Council; 1869/1870	Succeeded by Fridolin Anderwert
Preceded by Melchior Josef Martin Knüsel	Member of the Swiss Federal Council; 1875–1878	Succeeded by Simeon Bavier
