= Peter Hess (Swiss politician) =

Swiss politician

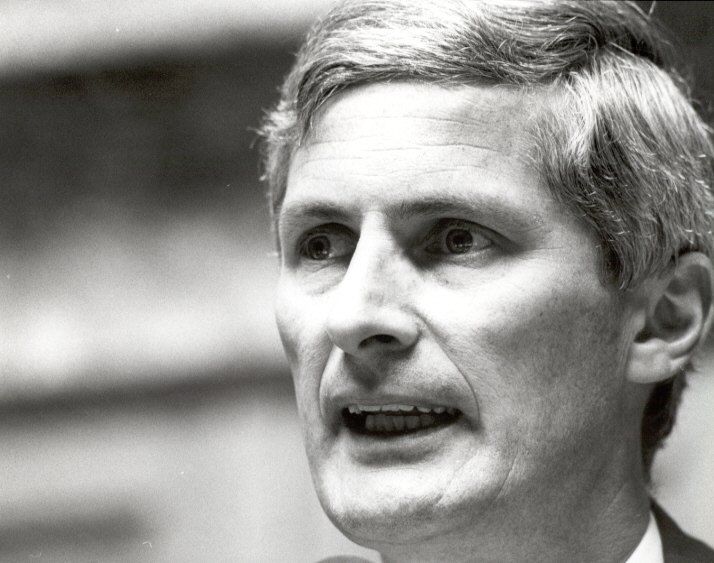

Personal details
- Born: 14 May 1948 (age 77) Unterägeri, Zug, Switzerland
- Party: CVP

Peter Hess (born 14 May 1948) is a Swiss politician and former President of the National Council (2000–01).

Hess was embroiled in controversy whilst serving as President of the National Council. A scandal arose when it was revealed that he was concurrently serving as director of several companies which had been accused of money laundering. Hess had garnered criticism for not disclosing his business dealings prior to serving as president. Hess was called to resign, but he refused. Furthermore, Hess had resigned from the board of British-American Tobacco, which had been involved in cigarette smuggling in the 1990s.

Hess is a lawyer and notary. He is married and has four children.

Preceded by Hanspeter Seiler	President of the National Council; 2000–2001	Succeeded by Liliane Maury Pasquier
