= Ulrich Bremi =

Swiss politician (1929–2021)

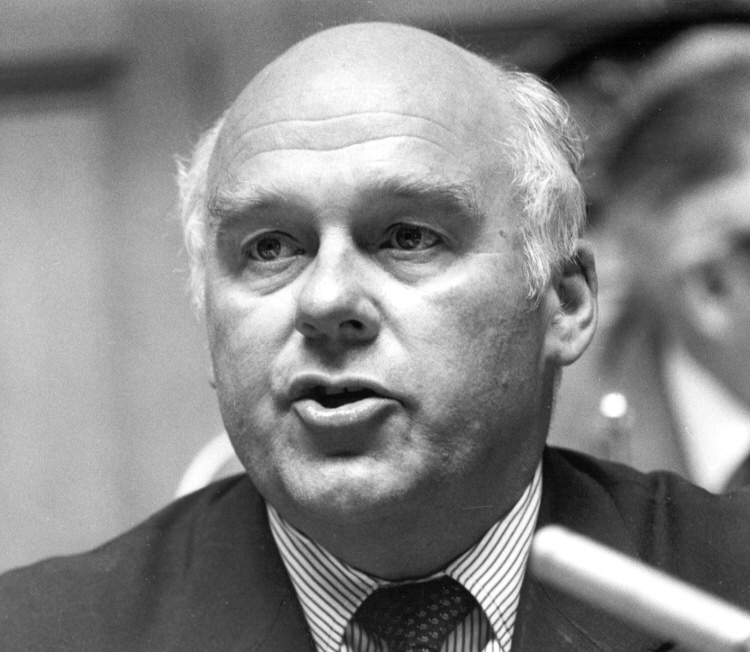
Ulrich Bremi

Ulrich Bremi (6 November 1929 – 17 June 2021) was a Swiss politician who served as member (1986–1989) and President of the National Council.
