= Irène Kälin =

Swiss politician

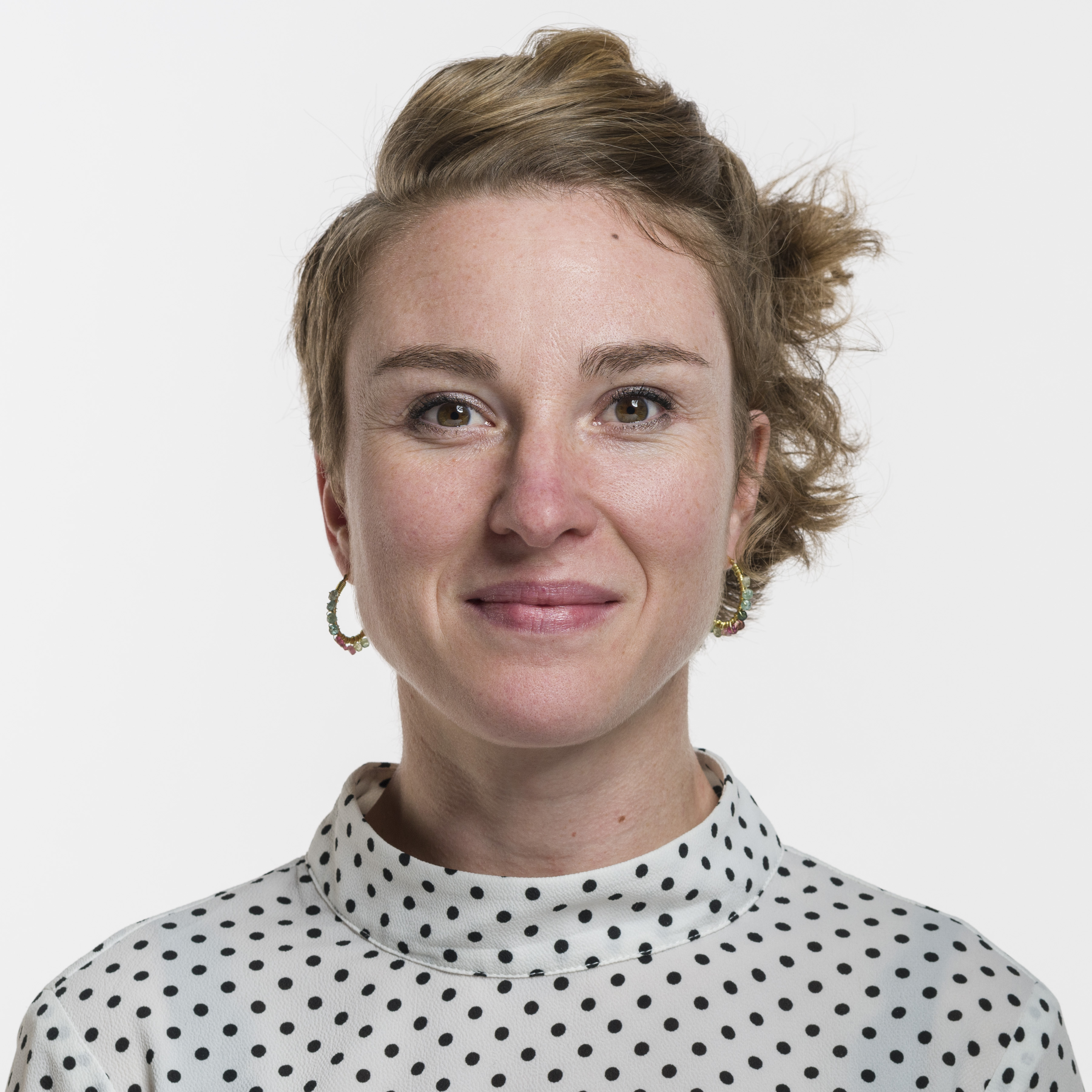
- Irène Kälin in 2019.

President of the National Council
- In office 29 November 2021 – 28 November 2022
- Preceded by: Andreas Aebi
- Succeeded by: Martin Candinas

Member of the National Council of Switzerland
- Incumbent
- Assumed office 27 November 2017
- Preceded by: Jonas Fricker

Member of the Grand Council of Aargau
- In office January 2010 – November 2017

Personal details
- Born: 6 February 1987 (age 39) Lenzburg, Aargau
- Party: Green Party of Switzerland
- Education: University of Zurich; University of Bern
- Occupation: Trade unionist

Irène Kälin (born 6 February 1987 in Lenzburg, Aargau; originally from Einsiedeln) is a Swiss politician of the Green Party.

== Life and career ==
=== Studies and professional career ===
Kälin earned her Matura at the Gymnasium Leonhard in Basel in 2007. In 2009, she started her Islamic and religion studies at the University of Zurich and obtained a Bachelor of Arts in 2013. In 2014, she joined the master's programme Religionskulturen of the University of Bern, where she wrote a dissertation about the state recognition of Islam. She worked as a trade unionist for Unia Aargau from 2015 to 2016 and is now the chairwoman of ArbeitAargau, the umbrella organisation of employees in the canton.

=== Political career ===
From January 2010 to November 2017, Kälin sat in the Grand Council of Aargau, where she served as the vice-chairwoman of three committees: the Committee for Responsibility Planning and Finance (2010–2013), the Naturalization Committee (2013–2015) and the Committee for Environment, Building, Transport, Energy and Land Use Planning (2013–2015); besides, she became a member of the Business Examination Committee in 2017. Moreover, she was the co-chairwoman of the Green Party group in the Grand Council.

Kälin was the vice-chairwoman of the Green Party of Switzerland from 2012 to 2014.

In the 2015 federal election, Kälin stood for the National Council and the Council of States but was defeated by 2,500 votes by Jonas Fricker. On 27 November 2017, she replaced the resigning Fricker in the National Council as she was listed second on the party's electoral list. She retained her seat in the 2019 federal election and was appointed as the second vice-chairwoman of the National Council for the year 2019–20. After having served as the first vice president in the legislature 2020-2021, she assumed as the President of the National Council in November 2021.

=== Political positions ===
In Parliament, Kälin has advocated for gender equality, ecology and animal welfare as well as the state recognition of Islam and supported the anti-nuclear movement. In April 2022 she and other Swiss parliamentarians were invited to Ukraine where they informed themselves on the situation of the ongoing Russian invasion of Ukraine.

=== Private life ===
In 2013, Kälin entered into a legal union with journalist Werner De Schepper. In 2018 they moved from Lenzburg to Oberflachs, Aargau. In the same year she gave birth to their first son whom she takes to the National Council during parliamentary debates. In 2023, her separation from De Schepper was announced, and Kälin moved to Aarau. She also speaks Persian and Arabic.

== See also ==
- List of members of the Federal Assembly from the Canton of Aargau
