= Isabelle Moret =

Swiss politician (born 1970)

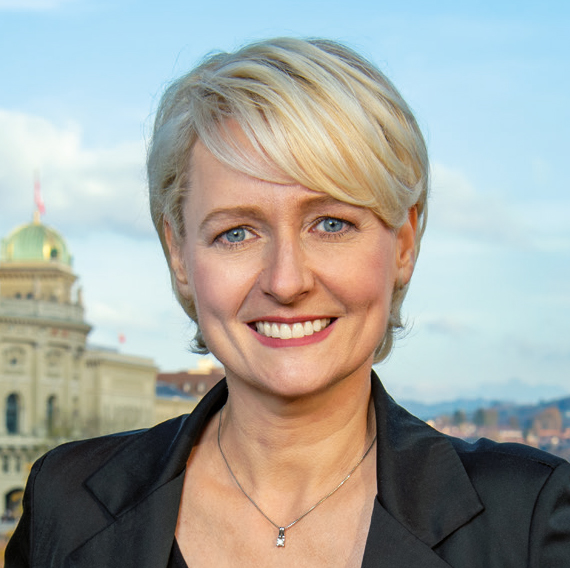

President of the National Council
- In office 2 December 2019 – 30 November 2020
- Preceded by: Marina Carobbio Guscetti
- Succeeded by: Andreas Aebi

First Vice President of the National Council
- In office 26 November 2018 – 2 December 2019
- Preceded by: Marina Carobbio Guscetti
- Succeeded by: Andreas Aebi

Member of the National Council
- Incumbent
- Assumed office 4 December 2006
- Constituency: Vaud

Personal details
- Born: Isabelle Zuppiger; 30 December 1970 (age 55) Lausanne, Switzerland
- Party: Free Democratic Party (before 2009); FDP.The Liberals (since 2009)

Isabelle Moret (born Zuppiger, 30 December 1970) is a Swiss politician who served as President of the National Council from 2019 to 2020. A member of FDP.The Liberals since its foundation in 2009, she first entered the National Council in 2006 as a member of the Free Democratic Party (FDP/PRD). Moret is a resident of Yens-sur-Morges in the canton of Vaud.

== Biography ==
The daughter of a railway worker, she grew up and studied in Lausanne, where she studied law and later obtained a postgraduate degree in European law. She then received her law license in Bern. She speaks fluent French, German, Swiss German, Italian, and English. She is the mother of two children.

== Career ==
After becoming a licensed attorney, she worked for several years in a Lausanne-based law firm. In 2013, she left the bar to concentrate on politics. She has chaired the Swiss Federation of Food Industries (Fial) and the Swiss umbrella association of hospitals (H+). She is also Vice Chairman of the Board of Directors of Swissgrid, the Swiss transmission system operator. In August 2017, while running for the Federal Council, the press revealed that she earns a gross annual income of 310,000 Swiss francs.

She began her political career in the Swiss Radical Democratic Party (PRD), now the FDP.The Liberals, as a member of the Committee on Domestic Policy in 1997. She was a member of the municipal council in Etoy from 1998 to 2006. In 1998 she also became vice-president of the Young Radicals Switzerland, while being a member of the SME committee and the Economic Commission of the Vaud PRD, of which she became president in 2003.

She was elected to the Grand Council of Vaud in 1999, before becoming a member of the Vaud Constitutional Assembly from 1999 to 2002. She left the Cantonal parliament in 2006, having notably been a member of the Finance Committee from 2002 to 2006.

In December 2006, she was elected to the Swiss Federal Parliament as a member of the National Council. She successfully ran for reelection in 2007, 2011 and 2015. In 2015, she received the most votes of all federal candidates in Francophone Switzerland with 65,351 votes. She sat on the Political Institutions Committee (CIP-CN) and the Social Security and Health Committee (CSSS-CN). The core of her activities pertain to issues related to the healthcare and pension systems and issues related to immigration and asylum.

In parallel with her office as member of the National Council, from 2008 to 2016 she was the vice-president of the Swiss Radical Democratic Party, and then of the FDP.The Liberals following the merger with the Swiss Liberal Party.

She ran for the Federal Council in September 2017 in a bid to succeed Didier Burkhalter. In the second round of voting, she came third, with 28 votes.

In December she was elected as the President of the National Council. She is the first woman from Vaud to hold the post.
