= Martin Candinas =

Swiss politician (born 1980)

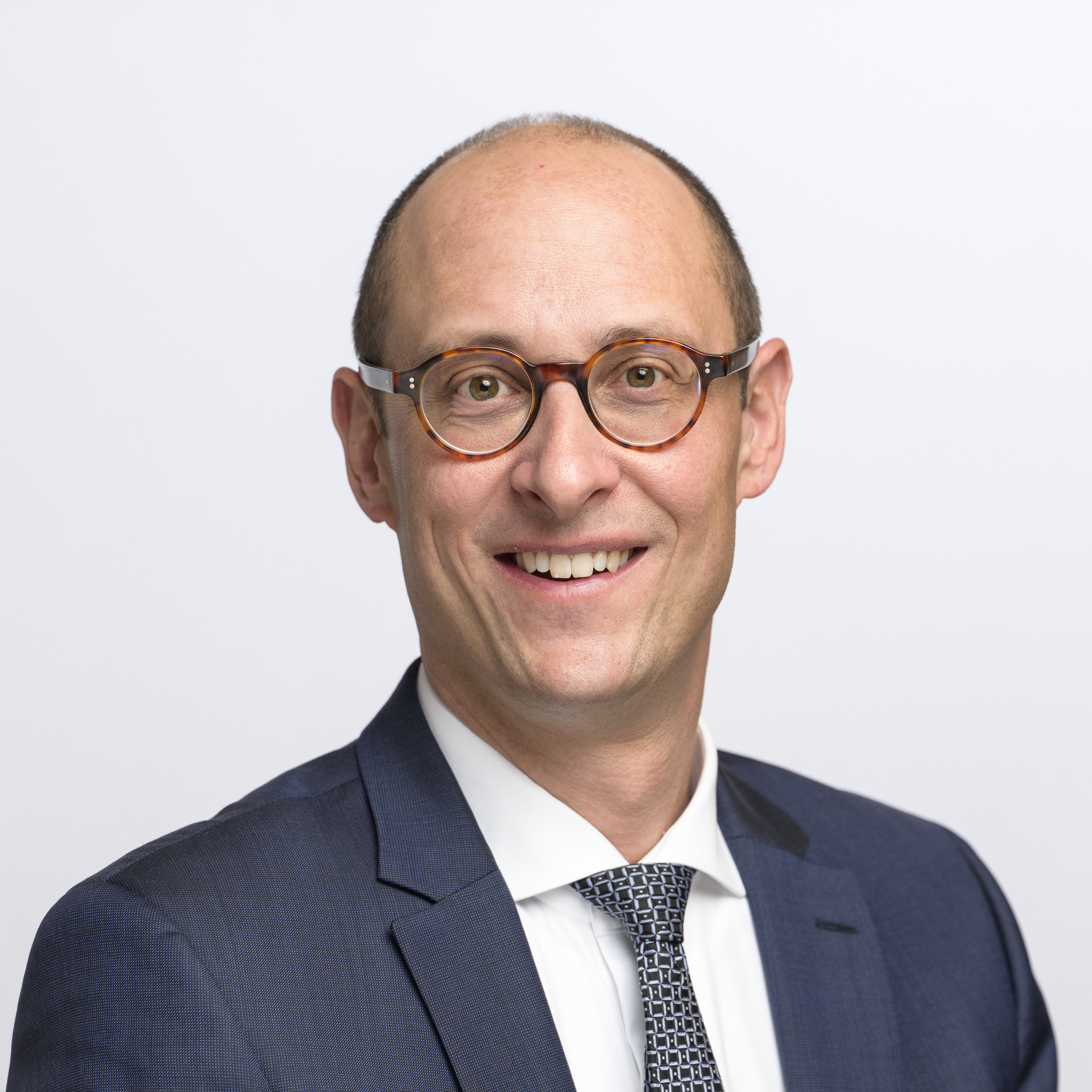
- Official portrait, 2023

Member of the National Council
- Incumbent
- Assumed office 5 December 2011
- Constituency: Grisons

President of the National Council
- In office 28 November 2022 – 3 December 2023
- Preceded by: Irène Kälin
- Succeeded by: Eric Nussbaumer

Personal details
- Born: 20 August 1980 (age 45) Ilanz, Switzerland
- Party: The Centre (until 2020 CVP)

Martin Candinas (born 20 August 1980) is a politician of The Center (DM) a member of the National Council of Switzerland.

== Early life ==
Candidas was born in Ilanz and graduated with a Matura from high school in Chur.

== Career ==
He worked for health insurance Helsana. In 2006 he was promoted to branch director in Chur. After he was elected to the National Council in 2011, he decreased his pensum to 50%. Until 2017 he was in charge of the sales department at the Helsana branches in Samedan, Chur and Glarus. In 2017 he became a specialist in Partner- and Key account management. In 2016 he assumed the presidencies of the Swiss Helicopter Association and Litra, which provides information on public transport.

=== Politics ===
At age 26, the youngest at the time, Candinas entered the Grand Council of Grisons in 2006. In the Federal Elections of 2011, he was elected to the National Council. He was subsequently re-elected in 2015 and 2019. He was considered as an Executive Councilor in Grisons for the elections in 2018, but he declined. In 2021, he assumed the Vice-Presidency of the National Council and elected to the rotating Presidency in November 2022. The Canton of Grisons had not had a President of the National Council for thirty-seven years and his election was celebrated in attendance of the Federal Councilor Viola Amherd in the Disentis Abbey and later Chur.

=== Political views ===
Candinas defended the interests of the mountainous cantons. He supported the farmers in their aim to be allowed to hunt wolves and suggested that municipalities with over 20% of vacation homes should be allowed to provide inhabitants with options to enlarge their homes. He opposed gay marriage, because he believes that the possibility to adopt a child should only be possible for a man and a woman. He is one of only three members in the National Council who speak Romansh and as the National Council's Vice-President, he used to begin sessions with a phrase in his native language, which he has stated, he will do as its president.

== Personal life ==
Candinas is married and is the father of three children. He speaks Romansh, Switzerland's fourth official language.
