= André Bugnon =

Swiss politician (born 1947)

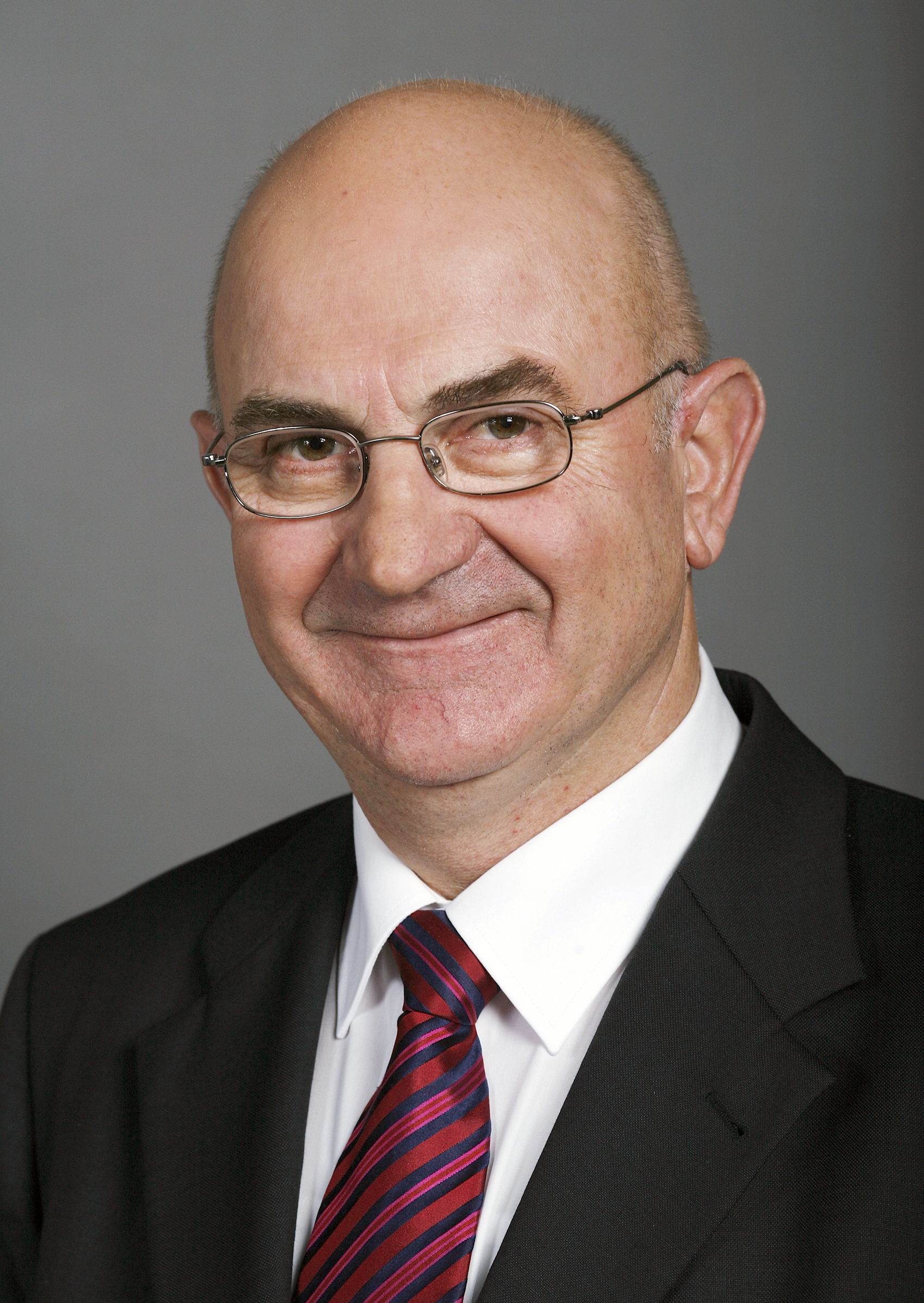
André Bugnon

André Bugnon (born 13 September 1947) is a member of the Swiss National Council and was President of the National Council for the 2007/2008 term. A member of the Swiss People's Party (UDC/SVP), Bugnon was elected to the National Council in 1999 and re-elected in 2003 and 2007.

Bugnon was born in Saint-Prex, Vaud. From 1988 to 1999, he was a member of the cantonal parliament of Vaud. He was mayor of his home town of Saint-Prex from 1990 to 2002.

Preceded by Christine Egerszegi	President of the National Council; 2007/2008	Succeeded by Chiara Simoneschi-Cortesi
