= Pascale Bruderer =

Swiss politician

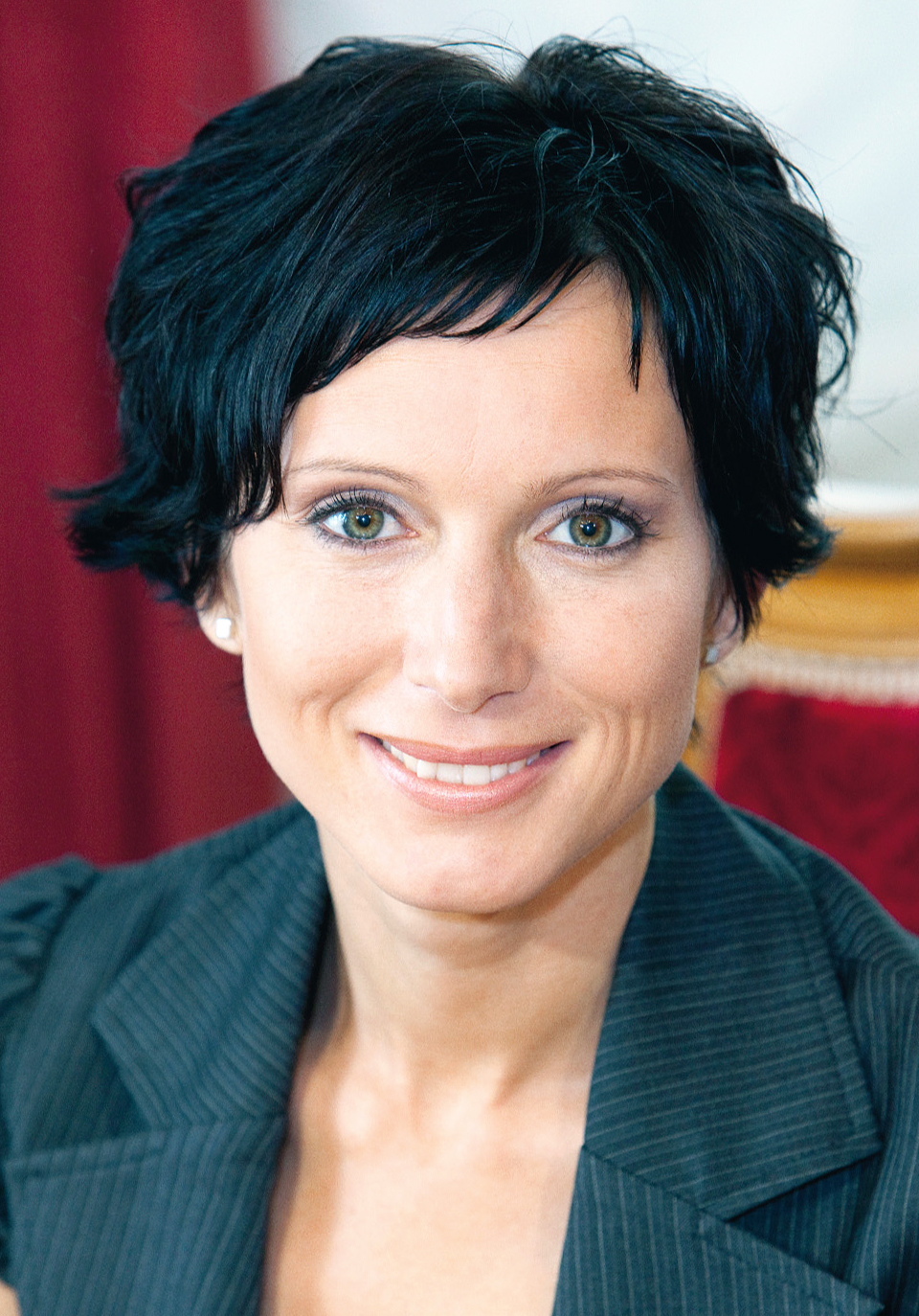

Member of the Council of States
- In office 5 December 2011 – 1 December 2019
- Constituency: Aargau

Member of the National Council of Switzerland
- In office 15 April 2002 – 4 December 2011

President of the National Council
- In office 23 November 2009 – 28 November 2010

Personal details
- Born: 28 July 1977 (age 48) Baden, Switzerland
- Party: Social Democratic Party of Switzerland
- Spouse: Urs Wyss
- Profession: Politician

Pascale Bruderer Wyss (born 28 July 1977 in Baden, Switzerland) is a Swiss politician. She was a member of the Council of States from 2011 to 2019 and a member of the National Council of Switzerland from 2002 to 2011. She was the President of the National Council in 2009 and 2010. She is a member of the Social Democratic Party.

== Biography ==
Bruderer attended the University of Zurich, and the University of Växjö, where she earned a master's degree in political science.

Bruderer retired from politics and did not run for re-election in 2019. She was elected to the board of Bernexpo Holding in 2019.

Preceded by Chiara Simoneschi	President of the National Council; 2009–2010	Succeeded by Jean-René Germanier
