= Christine Egerszegi =

Swiss politician (born 1948)

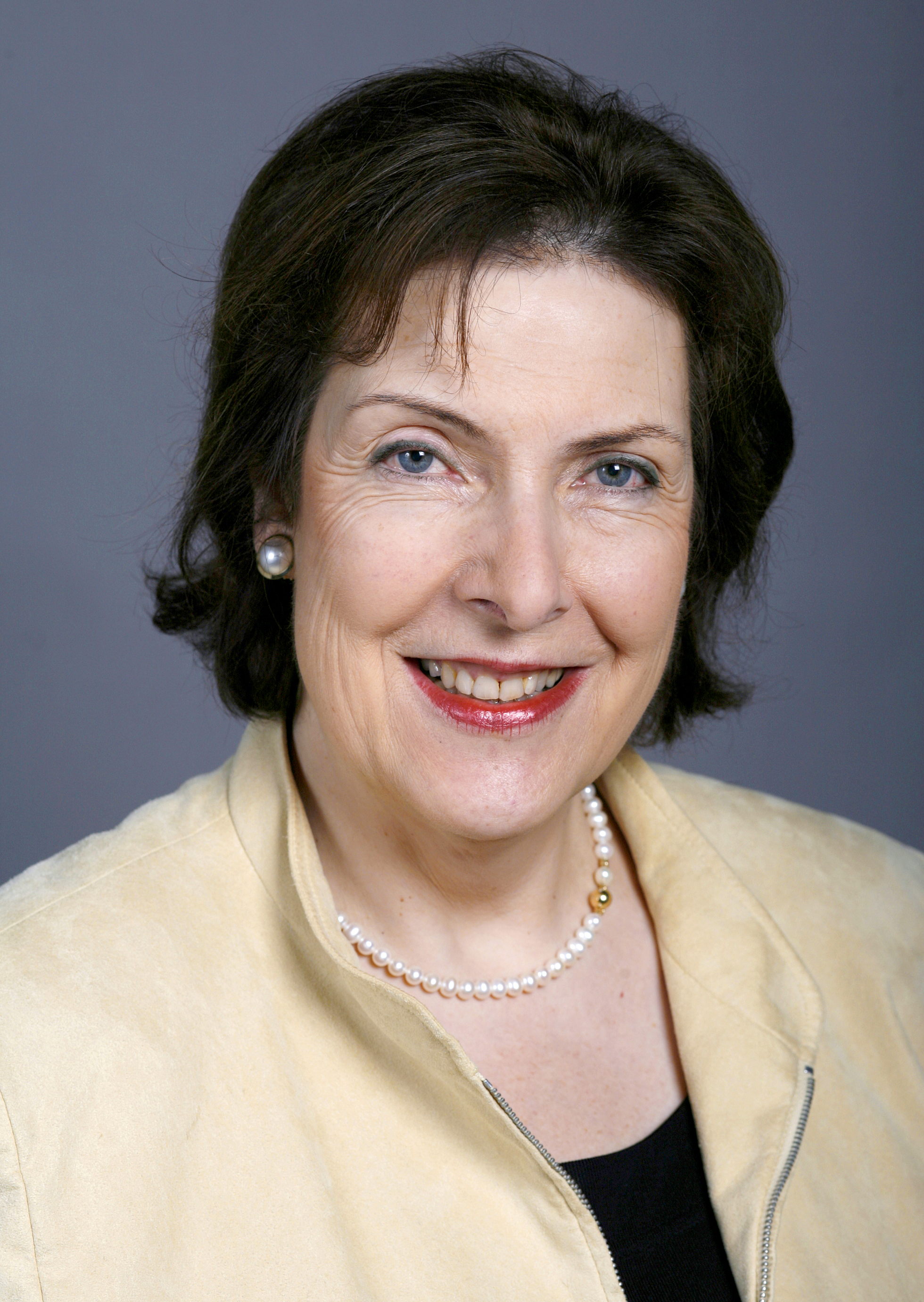

Christine Egerszegi-Obrist (born 29 May 1948) is a Swiss politician. She was a member of the Swiss Council of States from 2007 to 2015 and the National Council from 1995 to 2007. From 2006 to 2007, she was the President of the Swiss National Council. In the 2007 federal election, she became the first female representative of Aargau in the Council of States.

Preceded by Claude Janiak	President of the National Council; 2006/2007	Succeeded by André Bugnon
