= Chiara Simoneschi-Cortesi =

Swiss politician (born 1946)

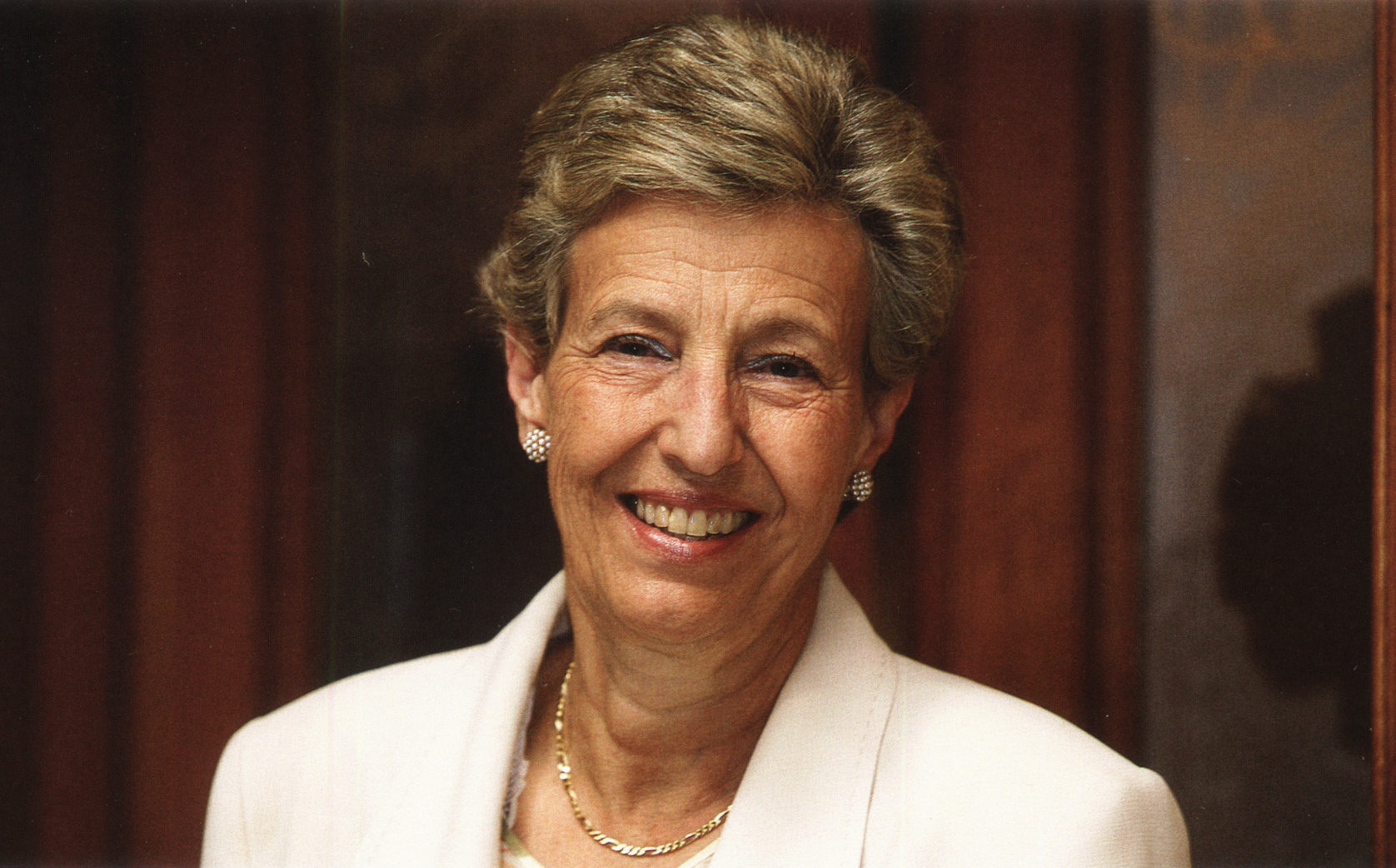
Chiara Simoneschi-Cortesi

Chiara Simoneschi-Cortesi (born 21 April 1946) is a Swiss politician. A member of the Christian Democratic People's Party (PPD/CVP/PDC), she was elected to the National Council in 1999 and re-elected in 2003 and 2007. Simoneschi was the President of the Swiss National Council in 2008/2009.

From 1987 to 1999, Simoneschi was a member of the cantonal parliament of Ticino and its president in 1998/1999. She was encouraged to go into politics by a young mother by the name of Ersilia Fossati, who was one of the first generation of women to be elected to the Grand Council of Ticino in 1971.

Preceded by André Bugnon	President of the National Council; 2008/2009	Succeeded by Pascale Bruderer
