= Alfred Weber (Swiss politician) =

Swiss politician and lawyer

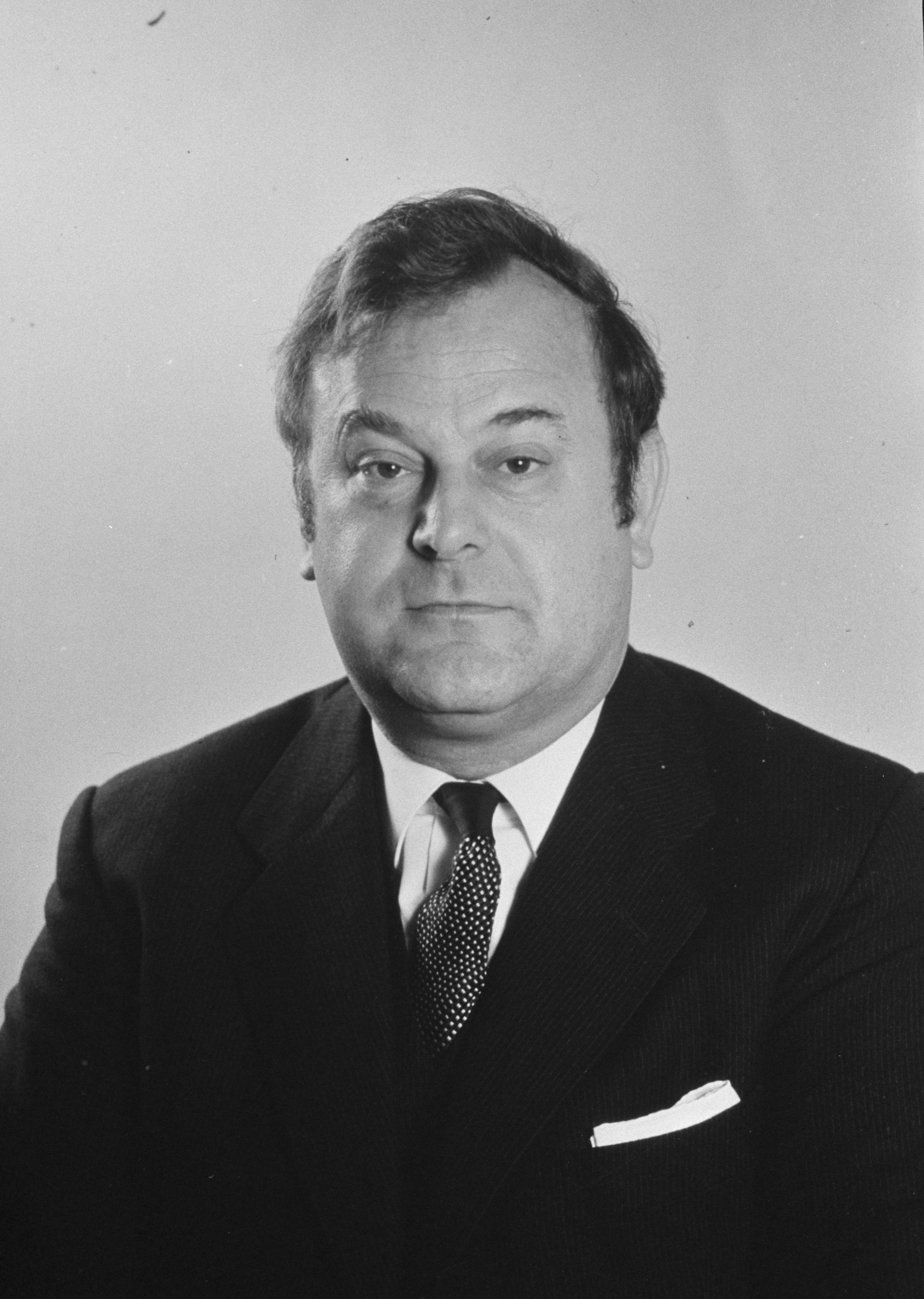
Alfred Weber

Alfred Hans Weber (19 November 1923, Linthal, Glarus – 26 March 2015) was a Swiss politician, lawyer, and former member of the National Council of Switzerland (1963–1979), the chamber of the federal parliament he presided in the 1970/1971 term.

Member of the Free Democratic Party (FDP/PRD), Weber was elected to the National Council in the Canton of Uri.

Weber was a citizen of Altdorf and Rothrist.

Preceded by Mathias Eggenberger	President of the Swiss National Council; 1970/1971	Succeeded by William Vontobel
