= Johannes Stössel =

Swiss politician (1837–1919)

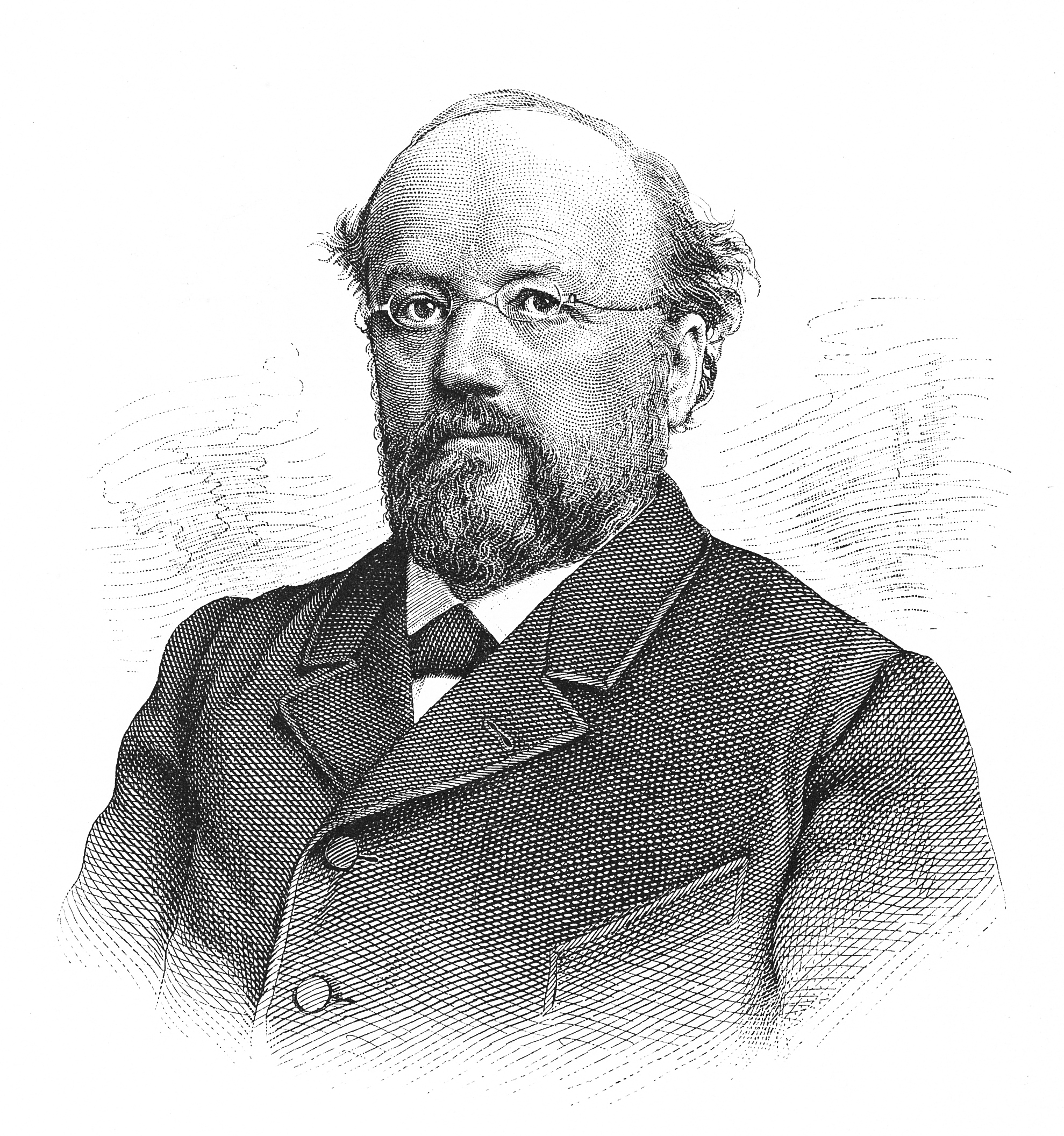

President of the National Council
- In office 1884–1885
- Preceded by: Georges Favon
- Succeeded by: Andrea Bezzola

Member of the National Council
- In office 1878–1891
- Constituency: Zurich

Personal details
- Born: 8 May 1837; Bettswil, Zurich
- Died: 7 November 1919 (aged 82); Rüschlikon, Zurich
- Political party: Free Democratic Party

Johannes Stössel (8 May 1837 – 7 November 1919) was a Swiss politician and President of the Swiss National Council (1884/1885).

== Early life and education ==
Stössel was born in 1837 in Bettswil as the son of a farmer. After finishing his training as a teacher in Küsnacht, he studied Legal science at the University of Zurich. After finishing his Bachelor of Laws degree in 1859, he then worked as a Privatdozent for National economy at the Zurich University of Applied Sciences and the ETH Zurich. In 1862, Stössel became the secretary of the Federal Statistics Bureau that was founded two years earlier. In 1864 he became the first editor of the Swiss Journal of Economics and Statistics and president of the Swiss Society of Economics and Statistics.

== Political career ==
As a Leader of the Democratic Movement of the Zürcher Oberland, Stössel was first a member of the Democratic Party until its dissolution. After which, he joined the Free Democratic Party and was later its third president in 1897.

=== Local ===
From 1869 to 1873, Stössel was Stadtholder of the Hinwil District. After which he was a prosecutor for two years. In 1875, he was elected to the Government Council of Zürich, where he served for 42 years, the longest in its history, until 1917. He was its president seven times.

=== National ===
In the 1878 Swiss federal election. Stössel was elected to the National Council as part of the Democratic Party. He was a member of the National Council until 1891, including a term as the president. In 1881, he ran for Chancellor of Switzerland but lost in the fourth round to Gottlieb Ringier. After his time in the National Council, he then became a member of the Council of States until 1905.

== Works ==
- Stössel, Johannes (1859). Die stillschweigende Willenserklärung nach römischem Rechte [The tacit declaration of intent under Roman law] (in German). Orell Füssli. OCLC 604444537.
