= Georges Favon =

Swiss politician

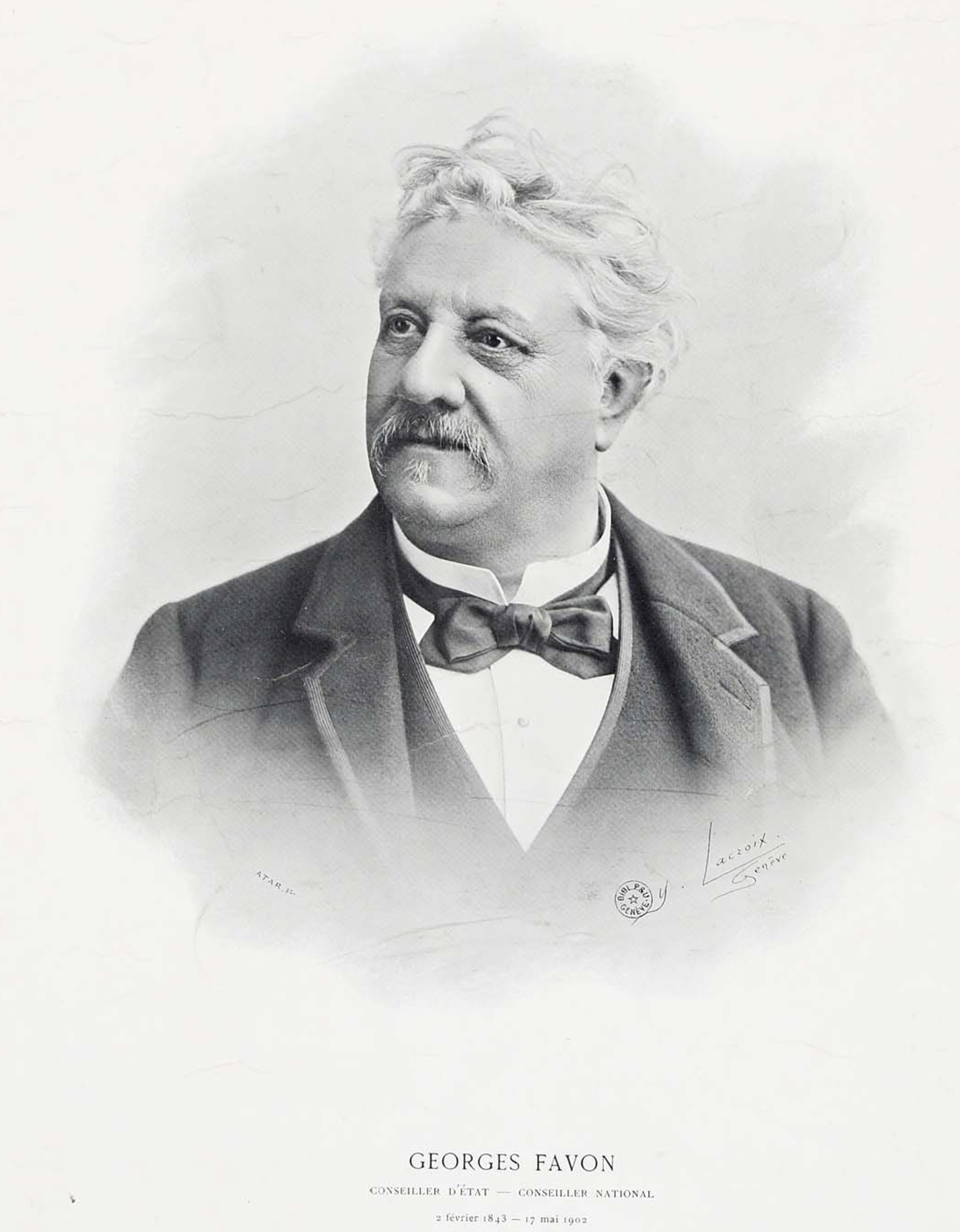
Portrait of Georges Simon Favon

Georges Simon Favon (2 February 1843 in Plainpalais – 17 May 1902) was a Swiss politician and President of the Swiss National Council (1884).

Boulevard Georges-Favon in Geneva is named for him.

| Preceded by Simon Kaiser | President of the National Council; 1884 | Succeeded by Johannes Stössel |
