= Gret Haller =

Swiss politician

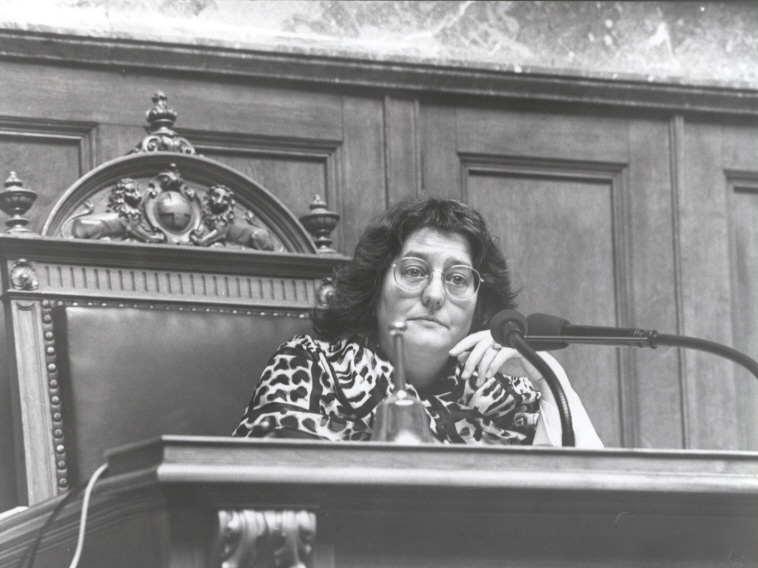

Member of the National Council of Switzerland
- In office November 1987 – November 1994

President of the Swiss National Council
- In office November 1993 – November 1994
- Preceded by: Claude Frey
- Succeeded by: Paul Schmidhalter

Personal details
- Born: Gret Haller; 1 October 1947 (age 78)
- Party: Social Democratic Party of Switzerland

Gret Haller (born 1 October 1947) is a jurist and a former Swiss politician of the Social Democratic Party of Switzerland (SP). From 1993 until 1994 she presided over the National Council of Switzerland.

== Political career ==
Between 1984 and 1988 she was a member of the executive council at the Municipality of Bern. In the federal election in 1987 she was elected into the National Council, over which she was the president during the legislative term of 1993–1994.

=== Political positions ===
She supports women's rights and an accession of Switzerland to the European Union.

== Diplomatic career ==
Between 1994 and 1996 she was Switzerland's ambassador to the Council of Europe in Strasburg and from 1996 onwards until 2000 she was the ombudswoman for human rights in Bosnia and Herzegovina on behalf of the Organization for Security and Co-operation in Europe (OSCE). In 2006 she became the Swiss representative to the Venice Commission, as which she was active until 2011. In 1999 she was the Swiss candidate for the Commissariat of Human Rights at the OSCE, but Álvaro Gil-Robles was elected instead.

== Academic career ==
Her doctoral degree she obtained with a thesis about the Human Rights in the United Nations and the Women's rights in Switzerland. Between 2006 and 2011 she was an assistant lecturer at the Goethe University in Frankfurt is currently a visiting scientist at the University of Konstanz.

== Honors ==
- 2004, Honorary Doctorate from the University of St. Gallen
- Honorary president of the Swiss Society for Foreign Policy

== Publications ==
Haller is a freelance journalist and has been President of the Swiss Society for Foreign Policy since 2014. She authored two books.
