= Arthur Eugster =

Swiss politician

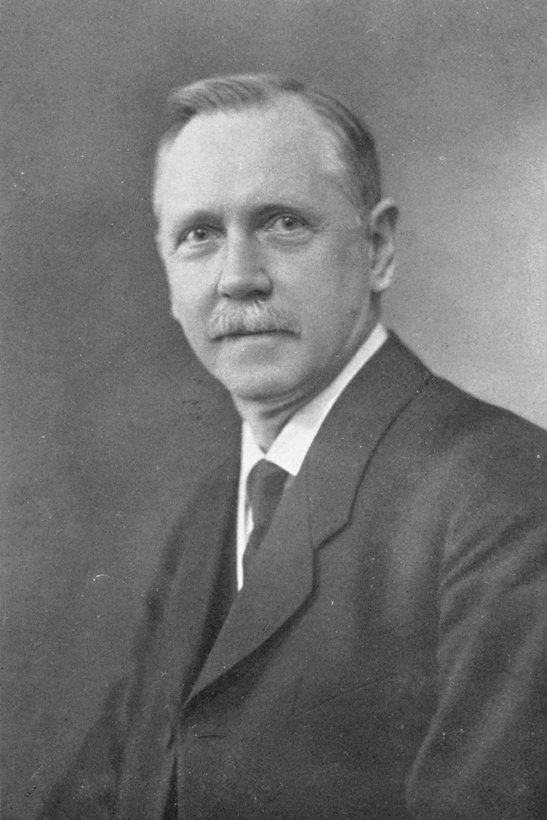

President of the National Council (Switzerland)
- In office 1 January 1915 – 1 January 1916
- Preceded by: Felix Bonjour
- Succeeded by: Anton Büeler
- Constituency: Appenzell-Ausserrhoden

Member of the National Council (Switzerland)
- In office 1 December 1902 – 1 March 1921

Personal details
- Born: Arthur Eugster; 5 April 1863 New York City, U.S.
- Died: 7 January 1922 (aged 58) Speicher, Switzerland
- Spouse: Bertha Eugster (m. 1887)
- Children: 5
- Occupation: Pastor, politician

Arthur Eugster (5 April 1863 – 7 January 1922) was an American-born Swiss pastor and politician who most notably served as a member of the National Council (Switzerland) from 1902 to 1921 and concurrently as its president in 1915/1916.

== Early life and education ==
Eugster was born 5 April 1863 in New York City, the younger of two sons, to Jakob Eugster (1833–1866), a textile merchant, and Anna Elisabeth Eugster (1839–1863), into an affluent Protestant family. His brother was Howard Eugster.

His paternal family was originally from Speicher in Appenzell-Ausserrhoden and emigrated to New York, where he was active in the textile industry, more specifcially in embroidery.

Preceded by Felix Bonjour	President of the National Council; 1915/1916	Succeeded by Anton Büeler
