= Claude Janiak =

Swiss politician

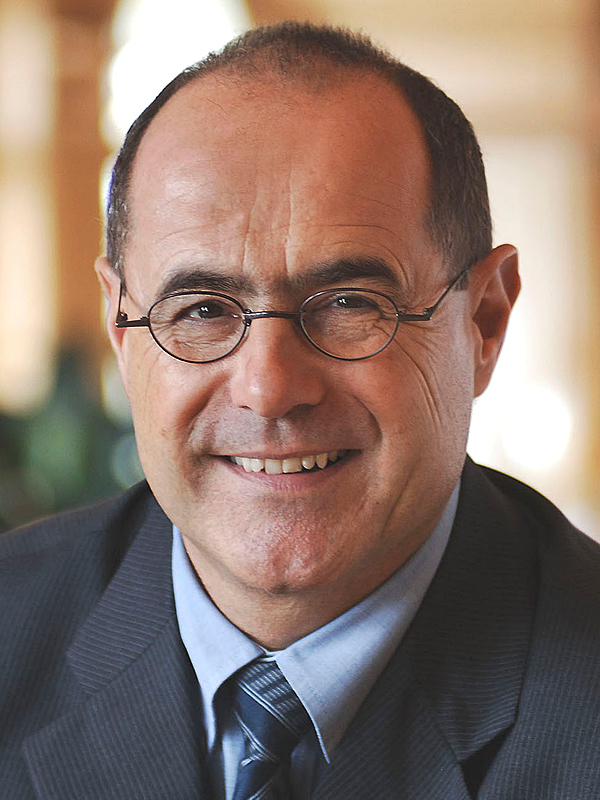
Claude Janiak

Claude Janiak (born 30 October 1948 in Basel) is a Swiss politician of Polish origin, lawyer and President of the Swiss National Council for the 2005/2006 term. Member of the Social Democratic Party (SPS), he was elected to the National Council in 1999 in the canton of Basel-Land and reelected in 2003. In 2007, he was elected to the Swiss Council of States.

He studied law at the University of Basel (1967–1971) and in London. In 1975, he completed his doctorate degree. He is attorney-at-law in Binningen since 1978. From 1991, he is a member of the board of the cantonal bank of Basel-Land (Basellandschaftliche Kantonalbank).

He was a member of the cantonal parliament of Basel-Landschaft (1981–1987 and 1994–1999, president 1998/1999), of the city parliament of Binningen (1988–1995), and of the executive of Bubendorf (1976–1979).

Born in Basel of Polish father and a Swiss mother, he acquired Swiss citizenship only in 1956 (he has also been a Polish citizen since birth). Today, he is a citizen of Basel and Binningen.

He was the first openly LGBT President of the Swiss National Council and lives in a registered partnership.

Preceded by Thérèse Meyer	President of the National Council; 2005/2006	Succeeded by Christine Egerszegi
