= Judith Stamm =

Swiss jurist and politician (1934–2022)

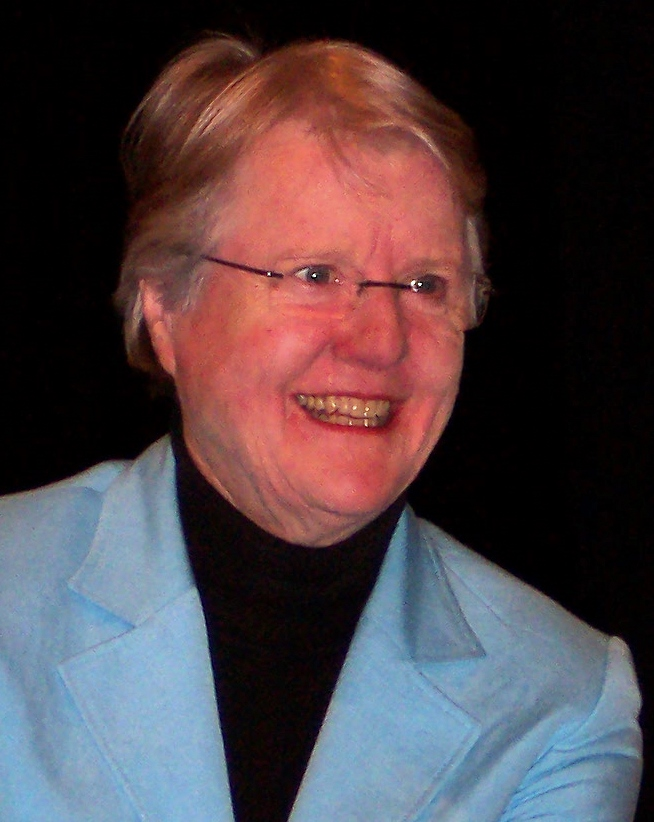
- Stamm in 2009

Member of the National Council
- In office 1983–1999

President of the National Council
- In office 1996–1997

Personal details
- Born: Judith Stamm; 25 February 1934 Schaffhausen, Switzerland
- Died: 20 July 2022 (aged 88) Lucerne, Switzerland
- Party: Christian Democratic People's Party
- Education: University of Zurich

Judith Stamm (25 February 1934 – 20 July 2022) was a Swiss jurist and politician of the Christian Democratic People's Party (CVP). She was seen as an influential women's rights activist.

== Early life and education ==
Judith Stamm was born in Schaffhausen on 25 February 1934, the daughter of a railway official and a housewife. She knew early on that she wanted to become a lawyer and studied law at the University of Zurich, from where she graduated with a doctorate.

== Professional career ==
Until 1960, Stamm worked at the district court in Uster. She would have liked to become a court clerk, and the courts president would have hired her, but as a woman she lacked the political rights required for the post. Instead, she applied for and obtained the position of an assistant to the cantonal police in Lucerne, where she initially was the only woman in the police corps. For twenty years, she remained with the police, trained new recruits in the police force and eventually she herself was promoted to become a police officer.

== Political career ==
Stamm's political career began in 1970, the first year women were allowed to take part in elections in Lucerne. In early 1971 she was asked to join the CVP and become a candidate in the local elections later that year. She accepted and was elected into the Grand Council of Lucerne, of which she remained a member until 1984.

In the Federal Elections of 1983, she was elected National Councilor. In 1986, she submitted a bill demanding the enforcement of the constitutional article "Equal rights for Men and Women", which then led in the year 1988 to the founding of the Federal Office for Equal Opportunities for Women and Men. In 1986, disappointed by the fact that her party did not put forward a woman candidate, she became a candidate to succeed one of the Federal Councillors, Alfons Egli and Kurt Furgler, but was unsuccessful. Despite the failure, her efforts encouraged other women to become candidates in the future.

In 1989, Stamm became the President of the Federal Commission for Women's Issues (EKF) after being elected by the Federal Council. In the 1996–1997 legislative term she acted as the President of the National Council.

== Later life ==
After her political career, she became the first woman to preside over the Schweizerische Gemeinnützige Gesellschaft (SGG) as well the Rütli commission between 1998 and 2007. In 2019 she was an editor of seniorweb, an online outlet for people over 50 years of age.

== Award ==
- 2002 Badge of Honour (de:Ehrennadel der Stadt Luzern) by the City of Lucerne
