= Simon Kaiser (politician) =

Swiss politician (1828–1898)

Simon Kaiser (24 October 1828 in Biberist – 27 March 1898) was a Swiss politician and President of the Swiss National Council twice (1868/1869 and 1883/1884).

Preceded by Johann Jakob Stehlin	President of the National Council; 1868/1869	Succeeded by Louis Ruchonnet
Preceded by Adolf Deucher	President of the National Council; 1883/1884	Succeeded by Georges Favon
