= Trix Heberlein =

Swiss politician

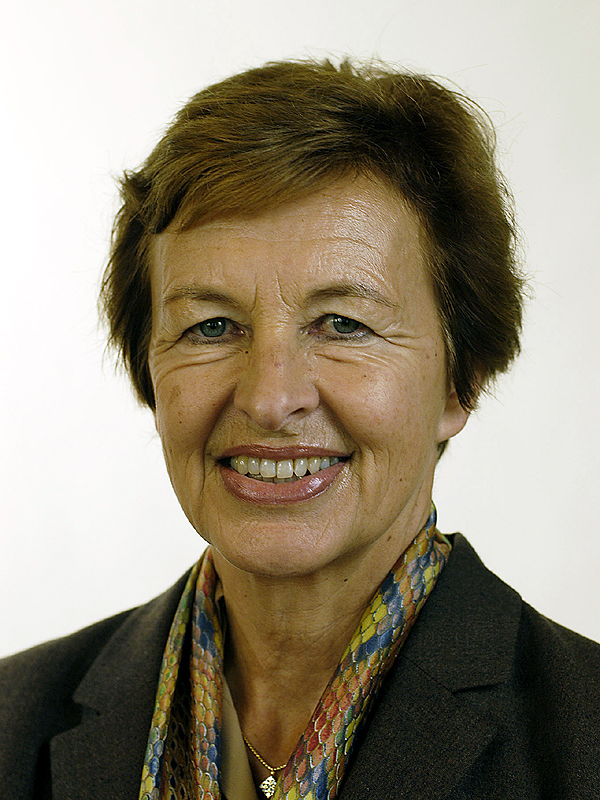

Member of the Council of States of Switzerland
- In office 1 December 2003 – 2 December 2007

Member of the National Council of Switzerland
- In office 13 March 1991 – 11 November 2003

Personal details
- Born: 17 July 1942 (age 84) St. Gallen, Switzerland
- Party: Free Democratic Party of Switzerland
- Education: University of Zurich
- Occupation: Lawyer

Trix Heberlein-Ruff (born 17 July 1942, in St. Gallen) is a Swiss politician of the Free Democratic Party (FDP) and a former president of the National Council of Switzerland.

== Life and career ==
Heberlein attended primary school in Teufen, later cantonal school in St. Gallen and earned her Matura in 1961. She subsequently studied law at the University of Zurich and earned a license degree in 1965. Later she took the lawyer exam.

== Political career ==
Heberlein was elected into the Cantonal Council of Zurich in 1979 which she was a part of until 1991. From 1991 to 2003, she was a member of the National Council which she chaired from November 1998 to December 1999. Then she represented the canton of Zurich in the Council of States from 2003 to 2007. On 20 December 2006, she announced she would retire by the end of her term. From 1998 to 2014, Heberlein chaired the foundation Swisstransplant that promotes organ donation. After she resigned from the Council of States she was the president of Zewo, a foundation which certifies NGO's. between 2008 and 2015.

== Personal life ==
Since 1967, she has been married to lawyer Robert Heberlin, with whom she has two daughters. She is a proficient skier and during her political career she organized several Ski races between Swiss parliamentarians, and interparliamenetarian races with members of the parliaments of either Austria or Great Britain. Her places of origin are Zumikon and Wattwil.
