= Enrico Franzoni =

Swiss lawyer and politician

Enrico Franzoni (1971)

Enrico Franzoni (born 10 January 1920 in Locarno; died 7 September 2008 in Locarno) was a Swiss lawyer and politician with the Christian Democratic People's Party of Switzerland.

== Biography ==
Franzoni studied at the University of Bern from which he obtained a licence in law. He also attended the Graduate Institute of International Studies in Geneva. He then opened a law and notary practice in Locarno.

Franzoni began his political career in Muralto, where he sat for the Conservatives on the municipal council from 1948 to 1952 and was mayor from 1952 to 1963. From 1959 to 1975, he sat on the National Council of Switzerland, which he chaired in 1972 to 1973. In 1971–1972, he was also president of the parliamentary group of the Christian Democratic People's Party of Switzerland. He was also president of the National Council's Audit Committee from 1969 to 1971. From 1963 to 1970, Franzoni was a member of the Consultative Assembly (now Parliamentary Assembly) of the Council of Europe.

In 1973, Franzoni was a Christian Democratic People's Party candidate for the Swiss Federal Council in Ticino, but he was not elected. He then served as president of the non-profit Caritas Switzerland and vice-president of the Postal Telegraph and Telephone (Switzerland) agency's board of directors.
