= List of members of the National Council of Switzerland, 2003–2007 =

This is a list of the 200 members of the Swiss National Council for the term 2003–2007.

The elections were held on October 19, 2003, and the first session opened on December 1, 2003. The final autumn session was held September 17 - October 5, 2007 and the elections for the next term on October 21, 2007.

For the abbreviations, see Political parties of Switzerland

Name	Party	Canton	URL	Note
Fabio Abate	FDP/PRD	Ticino		
Ruedi Aeschbacher	EVP	Zürich		
Evi Allemann	SPS/PSS	Bern		
Viola Amherd	CVP/PDC	Valais		Since May 31, 2005; succeeded to Jean-Michel Cina
Adrian Amstutz	SVP/UDC	Bern		
Josiane Aubert	SPS/PSS	Vaud		Since June 4, 2007, succeeded by Pierre Salvi
Caspar Baader	SVP/UDC	Basel-Landschaft		
Elvira Bader	CVP/PDC	Solothurn		
Boris Banga	SPS/PSS	Solothurn		
Luc Barthassat	CVP/PDC	Geneva		Since May 30, 2005; succeeded to Jean-Philippe Maitre
Alexander Baumann	SVP/UDC	Thurgau		
Martin Bäumle	GLP	Zürich		
Serge Beck	LPS/PLS	Vaud		
Didier Berberat	SPS/PSS	Neuchâtel		
Urs Bernhardsgrütter	GPS	St. Gallen		Since June 6, 2006; succeeded to Pia Hollenstein
Duri Bezzola	FDP/PRD	Grisons		Resigned March 2007, succeeded by Jürg Michel
Elmar Bigger	SVP/UDC	St. Gallen		
Attilio Bignasca	Lega	Ticino		
Max Binder	SVP/UDC	Zürich		President 2003/2004
Christoph Blocher	SVP/UDC	Zürich		Presided the opening of the first session on December 1, 2003, as longest-serving member; Elected to the Federal Council in December 2003; succeeded by Hans Rutschmann
Roland Borer	SVP/UDC	Solothurn		
Toni Bortoluzzi	SVP/UDC	Zürich		
Pascale Bruderer	SPS/PSS	Aargau		
Franz Brun	CVP/PDC	Lucerne		
Toni Brunner	SVP/UDC	St. Gallen		
Martine Brunschwig Graf	LPS/PLS	Geneva		
Jakob Büchler	CVP/PDC	St. Gallen		
André Bugnon	SVP/UDC	Vaud		Vice-president 2006/2007, Second Vice-president 2005/2006
Cécile Bühlmann	GPS	Lucerne		Resigned March 4, 2006; succeeded by Louis Schelbert
Dominique de Buman	CVP/PDC	Fribourg		
Gerold Bührer	FDP/PRD	Schaffhausen		
Didier Burkhalter	FDP/PRD	Neuchâtel		
Marina Carobbio Guscetti	SPS/PSS	Ticino		Since June 6, 2007, succeeded to Franco Cavalli
Ignazio Cassis	FDP/PRD	Ticino		Since June 4, 2007, succeeded to Laura Sadis
Sep Cathomas	CVP/PDC	Grisons		
Franco Cavalli	SPS/PSS	Ticino		Resigned June 2007, succeeded by Marina Carobbio Guscetti
Liliane Chappuis	SPS/PSS	Fribourg		Since March 5, 2007; succeeded to Erwin Jutzet; died June 25, 2007; succeeded by Jean-François Steiert
Maurice Chevrier	CVP/PDC	Valais		
Yves Christen	FDP/PRD	Vaud		Resigned December 4, 2006; succeeded by Isabelle Moret
Jean-Michel Cina	CVP/PDC	Valais		Until May 30, 2005; succeeded by Viola Amherd
Fernand Cuche	GPS	Neuchâtel		Resigned May 30, 2005; succeeded by Francine John-Calame
André Daguet	SPS/PSS	Bern		
Christophe Darbellay	CVP/PDC	Valais		
Walter Donzé	EVP	Bern		
Marlyse Dormond Béguelin	SPS/PSS	Vaud		
Jean Henri Dunant	SVP/UDC	Basel-Stadt		
John Dupraz	FDP/PRD	Geneva		
Christine Egerszegi-Obrist	FDP/PRD	Aargau		President 2006/2007, Vice-president 2005/2006
Jacques-Simon Eggly	LPS/PLS	Geneva		
Eduard Engelberger	FDP/PRD	Nidwalden		
Hugo Fasel	CSP	Fribourg		
Hildegard Fässler-Osterwalder	SPS/PSS	St. Gallen		
Jean Fattebert	SVP/UDC	Vaud		
Charles Favre	FDP/PRD	Vaud		
Hans Fehr	SVP/UDC	Zürich		
Hans-Jürg Fehr	SPS/PSS	Schaffhausen		
Jacqueline Fehr	SPS/PSS	Zürich		
Mario Fehr	SPS/PSS	Zürich		
Leni Flüglistaller	SVP/UDC	Aargau		Since May 30, 2005; succeeded to Christian Speck
Kurt Fluri	FDP/PRD	Solothurn		
Peter Föhn	SVP/UDC	Schwyz		
Oskar Freysinger	SVP/UDC	Valais		
Therese Frösch	GPS	Bern		
Brigitta Gadient	SVP/UDC	Grisons		
Chantal Galladé	SPS/PSS	Zürich		
Valérie Garbani	SPS/PSS	Neuchâtel		
Ruth Genner	GPS	Zürich		
Jean-René Germanier	FDP/PRD	Valais		
Ulrich Giezendanner	SVP/UDC	Aargau		
Ida Glanzmann-Hunkeler	CVP/PDC	Lucerne		Since September 2006, succeeded to Josef Leu
Jean-Paul Glasson	FDP/PRD	Fribourg		
Walter Glur	SVP/UDC	Aargau		
Christine Goll	SPS/PSS	Zürich		
Maya Graf	GPS	Basel-Landschaft		
Andreas Gross	SPS/PSS	Zürich		
Jost Gross	SPS/PSS	Thurgau		Died May 6, 2005; succeeded by Edith Graf-Litscher
Yves Guisan	FDP/PRD	Vaud		
Paul Günter	SPS/PSS	Bern		
Felix Gutzwiller	FDP/PRD	Zürich		
Josy Gyr-Steiner	SPS/PSS	Schwyz		Resigned April 10, 2007 (died April 18, 2007); succeeded by Andy Tschümperlin
Hans Rudolf Gysin	FDP/PRD	Basel-Landschaft		
Remo Gysin	SPS/PSS	Basel-Stadt		
Brigitte Häberli-Koller	CVP/PDC	Thurgau		
Barbara Haering	SPS/PSS	Zürich		
Ursula Haller	SVP/UDC	Bern		
Andrea Hämmerle	SPS/PSS	Grisons		
Hansjörg Hassler	SVP/UDC	Grisons		
Rolf Hegetschweiler	FDP/PRD	Zürich		
Bea Heim	SPS/PSS	Solothurn		
Bernhard Hess	SD	Bern		
Norbert Hochreutener	CVP/PDC	Bern		
Urs Hofmann	SPS/PSS	Aargau		
Pia Hollenstein	GPS	St. Gallen		Resigned in June 2006; succeeded by Urs Bernhardsgrütter
Gabi Huber	FDP/PRD	Uri		
Vreni Hubmann	SPS/PSS	Zürich		
Marianne Huguenin	PdA	Vaud		
Ruth Humbel Näf	CVP/PDC	Aargau		
Jasmin Hutter	SVP/UDC	St. Gallen		
Markus Hutter	FDP/PRD	Zürich		
Adrian Imfeld	CVP/PDC	Obwalden		
Otto Ineichen	FDP/PRD	Lucerne		
Claude Janiak	SPS/PSS	Basel-Landschaft		President 2005/2006, Vize-President 2004/2005, Second Vice-president 2003/2004
Walter Jermann	CVP/PDC	Basel-Landschaft		
Rudolf Joder	SVP/UDC	Bern		
Francine John-Calame	GPS	Neuchâtel		Since May 31, 2005; succeeded to Fernand Cuche
Erwin Jutzet	SPS/PSS	Fribourg		Resigned March 2007; succeeded by Liliane Chappuis
Hans Kaufmann	SVP/UDC	Zürich		
Robert Keller	SVP/UDC	Zürich		
Margret Kiener Nellen	SPS/PSS	Bern		
Marianne Kleiner	FDP/PRD	Appenzell Ausserrhoden		
Pierre Kohler	CVP/PDC	Jura		
Josef Kunz	SVP/UDC	Lucerne		
Josef Lang	SGA	Zug		
Otto Laubacher	SVP/UDC	Lucerne		
Josef Leu	CVP/PDC	Lucerne		Resigned June 2006; succeeded by Ida Glanzmann-Hunkeler
Ueli Leuenberger	GPS	Geneva		
Filippo Leutenegger	FDP/PRD	Zürich		
Susanne Leutenegger Oberholzer	SPS/PSS	Basel-Landschaft		
Doris Leuthard	CVP/PDC	Aargau		Elected to the Federal Council on June 14, 2006, succeeded by Markus Zemp
Christian Levrat	SPS/PSS	Fribourg		
Edith Graf-Litscher	SPS/PSS	Thurgau		Since May 30, 2005; succeeded to Jost Gross
Arthur Loepfe	CVP/PDC	Appenzell Innerrhoden		
Ruedi Lustenberger	CVP/PDC	Lucerne		
Pierre-Yves Maillard	SPS/PSS	Vaud		Until end of November 2004; succeeded by Roger Nordmann
Jean-Philippe Maitre	CVP/PDC	Geneva		President for 2004/2005, resigned for March 1, 2005 (died February 1, 2006); succeeded by Luc Barthassat
Christa Markwalder Bär	FDP/PRD	Bern		
Werner Marti	SPS/PSS	Glarus		
Barbara Marty Kälin	SPS/PSS	Zürich		
Hans Ulrich Mathys	SVP/UDC	Aargau		
Ueli Maurer	SVP/UDC	Zürich		
Liliane Maury Pasquier	SPS/PSS	Geneva		
Lucrezia Meier-Schatz	CVP/PDC	St. Gallen		
Anne-Catherine Menétry-Savary	GPS	Vaud		
Werner Messmer	FDP/PRD	Thurgau		
Thérèse Meyer	CVP/PDC	Fribourg		President 2005; succeeded to Jean-Philippe Maitre as president for the remainder of 2005
Jürg Michel	FDP/PRD	Grisons		Since March 5, 2007, succeeded to Duri Bezzola
Christian Miesch	SVP/UDC	Basel-Landschaft		
Isabelle Moret	FDP/PRD	Vaud		Since December 4, 2006; succeeded to Yves Christen
Christoph Mörgeli	SVP/UDC	Zürich		
Geri Müller	GPS	Aargau		
Thomas Müller	CVP/PDC	Vaud		Since December 4, 2006; succeeded to Felix Walker
Philipp Müller	FDP/PRD	Aargau		
Walter Müller	FDP/PRD	St. Gallen		
Vreni Müller-Hemi	SPS/PSS	Zürich		
Felix Müri	SVP/UDC	Lucerne		
Roger Nordmann	SPS/PSS	Vaud		succeeded to Pierre-Yves Maillard
Ruedi Noser	FDP/PRD	Zürich		
Fritz Abraham Oehrli	SVP/UDC	Bern		
Jacques Pagan	SVP/UDC	Geneva		
Guy Parmelin	SVP/UDC	Vaud		
Fabio Pedrina	SPS/PSS	Ticino		
Fulvio Pelli	FDP/PRD	Ticino		
Yvan Perrin	SVP/UDC	Neuchâtel		
Gerhard Pfister	CVP/PDC	Zug		
Theophil Pfister	SVP/UDC	St. Gallen		
Johannes Randegger	FDP/PRD	Basel-Stadt		Resigned December 11, 2006; succeeded by Urs Schweizer
Paul Rechsteiner	SPS/PSS	St. Gallen		
Rudolf Rechsteiner	SPS/PSS	Basel-Stadt		
Luc Recordon	GPS	Vaud		
Jean-Claude Rennwald	SPS/PSS	Jura		
Jean-Noël Rey	SPS/PSS	Valais		
André Reymond	SVP/UDC	Geneva		
Kathy Riklin	CVP/PDC	Zürich		
Jean-François Rime	SVP/UDC	Fribourg		
Meinrado Robbiani	CVP/PDC	Ticino		
Stéphane Rossini	SPS/PSS	Valais		
Maria Roth-Bernasconi	SPS/PSS	Geneva		
Claude Ruey	LPS/PLS	Vaud		
Hans Rutschmann	SVP/UDC	Zürich		Since March 30, 2004; succeeded to Christoph Blocher
Laura Sadis	FDP/PRD	Ticino		Resigned June 2007, succeeded by Ignazio Cassis
Pierre Salvi	SPS/PSS	Vaud		Resigned June 2007, succeeded by Josiane Aubert
Géraldine Savary	SPS/PSS	Vaud		
Louis Schelbert	GPS	Lucerne		Since March 6, 2006; succeeded to Cécile Bühlmann
Simon Schenk	SVP/UDC	Bern		
Silvia Schenker	SPS/PSS	Basel-Stadt		
Marcel Scherer	SVP/UDC	Zug		
Ernst Schibli	SVP/UDC	Zürich		
Ulrich Schlüer	SVP/UDC	Zürich		
Walter Schmied	SVP/UDC	Bern		
Johann N. Schneider	FDP/PRD	Bern		
Pirmin Schwander	SVP/UDC	Schwyz		
Urs Schweizer	FDP/PRD	Basel-Stadt		Since December 11, 2006; succeeded to Johannes Randegger
Ulrich Siegrist	-	Aargau		Elected on the list of SVP/UDC, left the SVP/UDC caucus in May 2006.
Chiara Simoneschi-Cortesi	CVP/PDC	Ticino		Second Vice-president 2006/2007
Carlo Sommaruga	SPS/PSS	Geneva		
Christian Speck	SVP/UDC	Aargau		Died May 5, 2005; succeeded by Lieni Füglistaller
Peter Spuhler	SVP/UDC	Thurgau		
Jürg Stahl	SVP/UDC	Zürich		
Luzi Stamm	SVP/UDC	Aargau		
Jean-François Steiert	SPS/PSS	Fribourg		Since September 17, 2007; succeeded to Liliane Chappuis
Rudolf Steiner	FDP/PRD	Solothurn		
Hans Stöckli	SPS/PSS	Bern		Since 2004; succeeded to Rudolf Strahm
Rudolf Strahm	SPS/PSS	Bern		Until July 31, 2004, elected to head the Federal Price Surveillance Office; succeeded by Hans Stöckli
Heiner Studer	EVP	Aargau		
Doris Stump	SPS/PSS	Aargau		
Marc F. Suter	FDP/PRD	Bern		Since December 2006, succeeded to Kurt Wasserfallen
Franziska Teuscher	GPS	Bern		
Anita Thanei	SPS/PSS	Zürich		
Georges Theiler	FDP/PRD	Lucerne		
Pierre Triponez	FDP/PRD	Bern		
Andy Tschümperlin	SPS/PSS	Schwyz		Since April 2007; succeeded to Josy Gyr-Steiner
Pierre Vanek	Sol	Geneva		
René Vaudroz	FDP/PRD	Vaud		
Pierre-François Veillon	SVP/UDC	Vaud		
Ruth-Gaby Vermot-Mangold	SPS/PSS	Bern		
Daniel Vischer	GPS	Zürich		
Peter Vollmer	SPS/PSS	Bern		
Christian Waber	EDU	Bern		
Markus Wäfler	EDU	Zürich		
Felix Walker	CVP/PDC	St. Gallen		Resigned December 2006, succeeded by Thomas Müller
Hansjörg Walter	SVP/UDC	Thurgau		
Hansruedi Wandfluh	SVP/UDC	Bern		
Kurt Wasserfallen	FDP/PRD	Bern		Died December 2, 2006, succeeded by Marc F. Suter
Reto Wehrli	CVP/PDC	Schwyz		
Peter Weigelt	FDP/PRD	St. Gallen		Resigned June 2006, succeeded by Andreas Zeller
Hermann Weyeneth	SVP/UDC	Bern		
Hans Widmer (politician)	SPS/PSS	Lucerne		
Walter Wobmann	SVP/UDC	Solothurn		
Ursula Wyss	SPS/PSS	Bern		
Rosmarie Zapfl	CVP/PDC	Zürich		
Andreas Zeller	FDP/PRD	St. Gallen		Since September 2006, succeeded to Peter Weigelt
Markus Zemp	CVP/PDC	Aargau		Since 18 September 2006; succeeded to Doris Leuthard
Josef Zisyadis	PdA	Vaud		
Bruno Zuppiger	SVP/UDC	Zürich		

== See also ==
- List of members of the Swiss National Council (2007-2011)
- Presidents of the National Council of Switzerland
- List of members of the Swiss Council of States
