= Same-sex marriage in Switzerland =

Same-sex marriage has been legal in Switzerland since 1 July 2022. Legislation to open marriage to same-sex couples passed the Swiss Parliament in December 2020. The law was challenged in a referendum on 26 September 2021 by opponents of same-sex marriage and was approved with the support of 64% of voters and a majority in all 26 cantons. The law went into force on 1 July 2022. A provision of the law permitting same-sex marriages performed abroad to be recognised in Switzerland took effect on 1 January 2022. Switzerland was the seventeenth country in Europe and the 30th in the world to allow same-sex couples to marry.

Switzerland allowed registered partnerships for same-sex couples from 1 January 2007, following a 2005 referendum. These partnerships provided most, but not all, of the rights and benefits of marriage. Since the introduction of same-sex marriage on 1 July 2022, registered partnerships are no longer available in Switzerland.

== Registered partnerships ==
Results of the 2005 registered partnership referendum by canton, 5 June 2005

=== Passage and referendum ===
In a nationwide referendum on 5 June 2005, Swiss voters approved a registered partnership law granting same-sex couples the same rights and protections as married couples in terms of next of kin status, taxation, social security, insurance and shared possession of a dwelling. However, same-sex couples would not have the same rights in terms of joint adoption of children, access to fertility treatments and facilitated Swiss naturalisation of the foreign partner. Swiss law provides a faster route to citizenship for the spouse of a Swiss citizen, but did not recognise same-sex marriages conducted in foreign countries, instead classing them as registered partnerships (German: eingetragene Partnerschaft, pronounced [ˈaɪ̯nɡɛˌtraːɡɛnɛ ˈpartnərʃaft]; French: partenariat enregistré, pronounced [paʁtənaʁja ɑ̃ʁəʒistʁe]; Italian: unione domestica registrata, pronounced [uˈnjoːne doˈmɛstika redʒiˈstraːta]; Romansh: partenadi registrà, pronounced [pɐrtɐˈnaːdi rɐdʑiˈstraː]). The partnership bill was passed by the National Council 118–50 on 3 December 2003, and by the Council of States with some minor changes on 3 June 2004 by 25 votes to 0. An amendment proposed by the Green Party to allow adoption by registered partners was rejected. The National Council approved it again on 18 June, by a vote of 112 to 51, and the Council of States by 33 votes to 5.

18 June 2004 vote in the National Council
Party	Voted for	Voted against	Abstained	Absent (Did not vote)
Swiss People's Party	9: André Bugnon; Brigitta Gadient; Ursula Haller; Rudolf Joder; Yvan Perrin; Jean-François Rime; Ulrich Siegrist; Luzi Stamm; Pierre-François Veillon	39: Adrian Amstutz; Caspar Baader; Alexander Baumann; Elmar Bigger; Roland Borer; Toni Bortoluzzi; Toni Brunner; Jean Henri Dunant; Jean Fattebert; Hans Fehr; Peter Föhn; Oskar Freysinger; Ulrich Giezendanner; Walter Glur; Hansjörg Hassler; Jasmin Hutter; Hans Kaufmann; Robert Keller; Josef Kunz; Hans Ulrich Mathys; Ueli Maurer; Christian Miesch; Christoph Mörgeli; Felix Müri; Fritz Abraham Oehrli; Jacques Pagan; Theophil Pfister; André Reymond; Hans Rutschmann; Simon Schenk; Marcel Scherer; Ernst Schibli; Ulrich Schlüer; Walter Schmied; Hansjörg Walter; Hansruedi Wandfluh; Hermann Weyeneth; Walter Wobmann; Bruno Zuppiger	1: Otto Laubacher	5: Guy Parmelin; Pirmin Schwander; Christian Speck; Peter Spuhler; Jürg Stahl
Social Democratic Party	47: Evi Allemann; Boris Banga; Pascale Bruderer; Franco Cavalli; André Daguet; Marlyse Dormond Béguelin; Hildegard Fässler; Hans-Jürg Fehr; Jacqueline Fehr; Mario Fehr; Chantal Galladé; Valérie Garbani; Christine Goll; Andreas Gross; Jost Gross; Paul Günter; Josy Gyr-Steiner; Remo Gysin; Barbara Haering; Andrea Hämmerle; Urs Hofmann; Vreni Hubmann; Claude Janiak; Erwin Jutzet; Margret Kiener Nellen; Susanne Leutenegger Oberholzer; Christian Levrat; Pierre-Yves Maillard; Werner Marti; Barbara Marty Kälin; Liliane Maury Pasquier; Vreni Müller-Hemi; Fabio Pedrina; Rudolf Rechsteiner; Jean-Claude Rennwald; Jean-Noël Rey; Stéphane Rossini; Maria Roth-Bernasconi; Pierre Salvi; Géraldine Savary; Silvia Schenker; Rudolf Strahm; Doris Stump; Anita Thanei; Ruth-Gaby Vermot-Mangold; Hans Widmer; Ursula Wyss	–	–	5: Didier Berberat; Bea Heim; Paul Rechsteiner; Carlo Sommaruga; Peter Vollmer
Free Democratic Party	28: Fabio Abate; Duri Bezzola; Gerold Bührer; Didier Burkhalter; Yves Christen; John Dupraz; Christine Egerszegi-Obrist; Charles Favre; Kurt Fluri; Jean-Paul Glasson; Yves Guisan; Felix Gutzwiller; Gabi Huber; Markus Hutter; Otto Ineichen; Marianne Kleiner; Filippo Leutenegger; Christa Markwalder Bär; Philipp Müller; Walter Müller; Ruedi Noser; Fulvio Pelli; Laura Sadis; Rudolf Steiner; Georges Theiler; Pierre Triponez; René Vaudroz; Peter Weigelt	2: Werner Messmer; Kurt Wasserfallen	1: Eduard Engelberger	5: Jean-René Germanier; Hans Rudolf Gysin; Rolf Hegetschweiler; Johannes Randegger; Johann Schneider
Christian Democratic People's Party	9: Sep Cathomas; Norbert Hochreutener; Ruth Humbel Näf; Pierre Kohler; Doris Leuthard; Jean-Philippe Maitre; Lucrezia Meier-Schatz; Kathy Riklin; Rosmarie Zapfl	5: Elvira Bader; Maurice Chevrier; Adrian Imfeld; Thérèse Meyer; Reto Wehrli	12: Franz Brun; Jakob Büchler; Jean-Michel Cina; Christophe Darbellay; Dominique de Buman; Brigitte Häberli-Koller; Walter Jermann; Josef Leu; Ruedi Lustenberger; Gerhard Pfister; Meinrado Robbiani; Chiara Simoneschi-Cortesi	2: Arthur Loepfe; Felix Walker
Green Party	11: Cécile Bühlmann; Fernand Cuche; Therese Frösch; Ruth Genner; Maya Graf; Pia Hollenstein; Ueli Leuenberger; Anne-Catherine Menétry-Savary; Geri Müller; Franziska Teuscher; Daniel Vischer	–	–	1: Luc Recordon
Liberal Party	1: Martine Brunschwig Graf	–	2: Serge Beck; Claude Ruey	1: Jacques-Simon Eggly
Evangelical People's Party	–	3: Ruedi Aeschbacher; Walter Donzé; Heiner Studer	–	–
Federal Democratic Union	–	1: Markus Wäfler	–	1: Christian Waber
Swiss Party of Labour	2: Marianne Huguenin; Josef Zisyadis	–	–	–
Christian Social Party	1: Hugo Fasel	–	–	–
Green Liberal Party	1: Martin Bäumle	–	–	–
Socialist Green Alternative Zug	1: Josef Lang	–	–	–
Solidarity	1: Pierre Vanek	–	–	–
Swiss Democrats	–	1: Bernhard Hess	–	–
Ticino League	1: Attilio Bignasca	–	–	–
Total (Note: The President of the National Council, Max Binder, votes only in case of a tied vote.)	112	51	16	20
Total	56.3%	25.6%	8.0%	10.1%

The social conservative Federal Democratic Union collected signatures to force a referendum. Subsequently, the Swiss people voted 58% in favor of the bill on 5 June 2005. The law came into effect on 1 January 2007. Switzerland was the first nation to pass a same-sex union law by referendum. At the end of August 2008, the Federal Supreme Court ruled that long-term same-sex partners were entitled to the same vested pension benefits as long-term opposite-sex partners. A shared residence is not required.

Federal Act on registered partnerships of same-sex couples
Choice	Votes	%
For	1,559,848	58.04
Against	1,127,520	41.96
Total	2,687,368	100.00
Valid votes	2,687,368	98.30
Invalid/blank votes	46,470	1.70
Total votes	2,733,838	100.00
Registered voters/turnout	4,837,844	56.51

The ability to enter into a registered partnership was closed off on 1 July 2022. No further partnerships are granted in Switzerland, and couples may retain their status as registered partners or convert their union into a recognized marriage.

=== Adoption and parenting ===
Article 27 of the partnership law outlines the rights and responsibilities concerning a partner's child. It requires the partner of a biological or adoptive parent to provide financial support for the child and grants them full legal authority to represent the child in all matters by virtue of being the parent's partner. In the event of a partnership dissolution, the ex-partner also retains the right to maintain close ties with the child. This provision gives couples a genuine parental role. In 2010, Swiss LGBT organisations started the petition "Same Chances For All Families", calling for broader adoption rights. On 30 September 2011, the National Council debated the petition, but ultimately rejected it by a vote of 83–97. Nonetheless, the close vote reflected shifting attitudes. For example, Maja Ingold, MP for the Evangelical People's Party, spoke in favour of greater recognition of gay and lesbian parents, although her party had opposed the registered partnership law in 2005. While there was not yet a majority for full joint adoption, stepchild adoption (i.e. adoption of a partner's child) emerged as a potential compromise with broader parliamentary support.

The Council of States accepted the petition, and the Legal Affairs Committee approved a motion by MP Claude Janiak backing the right to full joint adoption regardless of marital status or sexual orientation. In November 2011, the committee voted unanimously in favour, including members of the conservative Swiss People's Party. In February 2012, the Federal Council issued its response, expressing support for stepchild adoption but opposing full joint adoption rights. Despite this, on 14 March 2012, the Council of States approved 21–19 the extension of full adoption rights to same-sex couples, irrespective of marital status or sexual orientation. Since the National Council had previously rejected the proposal in September 2011, the bill returned to that chamber. On 13 December 2012, the National Council voted 113–64 to allow a person in a registered partnership to adopt the biological or adopted children of their partner. However, the chamber rejected the Council of States' broader motion on full joint adoption rights. Finally, on 4 March 2013, the Council of States accepted the revised version approved by the National Council by a majority of 26–16.

In November 2014, taking into account the parliamentary votes, the Federal Council approved allowing stepchild adoption as part of a larger adoption reform. The bill would permit registered partners and cohabiting couples to petition to adopt, and would also lower the minimum age to adopt from 35 to 28. The legislation had to be approved by Parliament, though opponents had already announced they would force an optional referendum. For such a referendum to occur, citizens opposing the law had to gather 50,000 signatures within 100 days. In January 2016, the Council of States' Legal Affairs Committee voted 7 to 3 with one abstention to approve the bill. The Council of States voted 25–14 in favor on 8 March 2016. Federal Councillor Simonetta Sommaruga expressed her support for the bill and argued that it was "necessary" to legally protect children already raised by same-sex couples. On 13 May 2016, the National Council's Legal Affairs Committee voted 15–9 to approve the bill. The following day, it was approved by the National Council in a 113–64 vote. Differing texts caused the two chambers to agree on a final, slightly modified version of the bill that was passed in Parliament on 17 June 2016 by a vote of 125–68 with 3 abstentions. Following the final vote in Parliament, a referendum committee was established including members of several different political parties with the aim of forcing a referendum on the bill. No major party supported the committee. On 4 October 2016, it was confirmed that the referendum would not take place as only 20,000 signatures had been collected. The law took effect on 1 January 2018.

=== Statistics ===
The first same-sex partnership was registered on 2 January 2007 in the Italian-speaking canton of Ticino. By the end of June 2022, 12,332 same-sex partnerships had taken place in Switzerland.

Number of partnerships registered in Switzerland
	2007	2008	2009	2010	2011	2012	2013	2014	2015	2016	2017	2018	2019	2020	2021	2022 (Note: until 30 June)	Total
Female	573	271	284	221	246	267	230	270	261	227	306	275	225	265	221	65	4,237
Male	1,431	660	588	499	426	428	463	450	440	502	483	425	419	386	361	134	8,055
Total	2,004	931	872	720	672	695	693	720	701	729	789	700	674	651	582	199	12,332

Most partnerships were performed in the canton of Zurich at 3,786, followed by Vaud (1,350), Bern (1,271), Geneva (1,131), Aargau (655), Basel-Stadt (493), St. Gallen (426), Lucerne (412), Basel-Landschaft (404), Ticino (342), Fribourg (326), Valais (295), Solothurn (283), Thurgau (257), Neuchâtel (179), Zug (158), Schwyz (130), Grisons (129), Schaffhausen (88), Jura (55), Appenzell Ausserrhoden (46), Glarus (29), Nidwalden (28), Obwalden (24), Uri (22), and Appenzell Innerrhoden (13).

== Cantonal laws ==
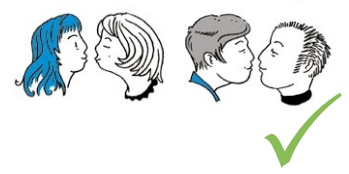
"Same-sex partnerships are allowed in Switzerland." Image from a 2016 Lucerne cantonal government publication for refugees

=== Cohabitation ===
Certain Swiss cantonal constitutions recognise and guarantee the right to cohabit and to found a family outside of marriage for both different-sex and same-sex couples; these include among others the constitutions of Vaud, Zurich, Appenzell Ausserrhoden, Basel-Stadt, Bern, Geneva, Zug, Schaffhausen, and Fribourg.

=== Registered partnerships ===
The canton of Geneva has had a partnership law on a cantonal level since 2001. It grants unmarried couples, both same-sex and opposite-sex, many of the same rights, responsibilities and protections as married couples. However, it does not allow benefits in taxation, social security, or health insurance premiums (unlike the federal law). The law is based on the French civil solidarity pact. In autumn 2016, the Department of Public Instruction of Geneva introduced new forms in schools allowing same-sex parents to be recognized; the previous forms with boxes for "father" and "mother" were replaced with two boxes listing "parents".

On 22 September 2002, the canton of Zurich passed a same-sex partnership law by referendum (62.7% in favor) that goes further than Geneva's law, but requires couples to live together for six months before registering. In July 2004, the Grand Council of Neuchâtel passed a partnership law recognizing unmarried couples by 65 votes to 38. The law grants registered partners all the cantonal-level rights of marriage. Registered partnerships for same-sex couples are also recognized in the Constitution of Fribourg. In May 2004, voters approved the Constitution with 58.03% in favor and 41.97% against. It took effect on 1 January 2005. Article 14(2) states: "The right to register a partnership for same-sex couples is guaranteed". (Note: In the official languages of Fribourg: French: Le droit d'enregistrer un partenariat pour les couples de même sexe est garanti.; German: Das Recht zur Eintragung einer Partnerschaft für gleichgeschlechtliche Paare ist gewährleistet.)

=== Marriage ===
On 6 June 2016, the Cantonal Council of Zurich rejected by a vote of 110–52 a proposal, entitled "Protection of Marriage" (German: Schutz der Ehe), that would have defined marriage in the Constitution of Zurich as "a union between one man and one woman". The proposal, introduced by the Federal Democratic Union (EDU/UDF), sought to constitutionally ban same-sex marriage in the canton. EDU and most members of the Swiss People's Party were in favor of the measure, while all other parties, including the Christian Democratic People's Party and the Evangelical People's Party, were opposed. The EDU subsequently gathered 6,000 signatures to force a cantonal referendum on the issue. The referendum took place on 27 November 2016, where the proposal was overwhelmingly rejected; 80.9% voted against it, while 19.1% voted in favor. Voters in Zurich's Aussersihl and Industriequartier districts voted "No" by more than 92%. All municipalities rejected the proposal.

Initiative «Schutz der Ehe»
Choice	Votes	%
For	75,362	19.09
Against	319,501	80.91
Total	394,863	100.00
Valid votes	394,863	97.73
Invalid/blank votes	9,162	2.27
Total votes	404,025	100.00
Registered voters/turnout	893,285	45.23

== Same-sex marriage ==
Laws regarding same-sex partnerships in Europe¹ Marriage Civil union Limited domestic recognition (cohabitation) Unrecognized Constitution limits marriage to opposite-sex couples ¹ May include recent laws or court decisions that have not yet entered into effect.

=== Political parties and support ===
In 2012, Parliament requested that the executive Swiss Federal Council examine how to update family law to reflect changes in society. In March 2015, the Council released its governmental report about marriage and new rights for families, raising the possibility of the introduction of registered partnerships for straight couples and marriage for gay and lesbian couples. Federal Councillor Simonetta Sommaruga, in charge of the Federal Department of Justice and Police, also stated she hoped that gay and lesbian couples would soon be allowed to marry.

Same-sex marriage is supported by the Green Party (GPS/PES), the Social Democratic Party (SP/PS), the Green Liberal Party (GLP/PVL), the Swiss Party of Labour (PdA/PST-POP), The Liberals (FDP/PLR), The Centre (formed in 2021 by the merger of the Christian Democratic People's Party (CVP/PDC) and the Conservative Democratic Party (BDP/PBD)), and Solidarity. The Swiss People's Party (SVP/UDC), the Evangelical People's Party (EVP/PEV), the Ticino League and the Federal Democratic Union (EDU/UDF) are mostly opposed. In 2017, Gerhard Pfister said he believed that around two-thirds of Christian Democratic lawmakers opposed same-sex marriage. However, a 2019 survey showed that about 83% of CVP candidates running in the October 2019 federal election were in favour of same-sex marriage. The same survey showed that 48% of SVP candidates were in favour. In April 2018, the women's wing of The Liberals voted by 56 votes to 2 to support same-sex marriage. On 26 January 2019, the national Swiss People's Party adopted a new party programme. A proposal to strike the party's opposition to same-sex marriage was rejected by the delegates with a vote of 126 to 166.

During a 2019 public consultation on the legalisation of same-sex marriage, the governments of Geneva, Vaud, Zurich, Bern, Basel-Stadt, Basel-Landschaft, Aargau, Luzern, Valais, Schaffhausen, Grisons, Ticino, Fribourg, Neuchâtel, St. Gallen, Solothurn, Jura, Glarus, Appenzell Ausserrhoden, Zug, Uri and Thurgau expressed support for the opening of marriage to same-sex couples, while the governments of Schwyz, Nidwalden, Appenzell Innerrhoden and Obwalden expressed opposition. Several organisations and associations also indicated their support, including LGBT and feminist groups, Operation Libero, the National Ethics Committee, ProFamilia CH, the Swiss Psychological Society, and religious groups such as the Old Catholic Church, the Protestant Church of Switzerland and the Swiss Federation of Jewish Communities. Opposition was found mainly among pro-life and religious groups, including the Episcopal Conference of Switzerland. On 15 August 2019, Gottfried Locher, president of the Protestant Church, declared his personal support for same-sex marriage. In November 2019, the Protestant Church voted to support the opening of marriage to same-sex couples. This followed a June 2019 statement from the church, "We are created by God. We cannot choose our sexual orientation. We perceive it as an expression of creative fullness."

=== Popular initiative "For the couple and the family" ===
==== Signature gathering and approval ====
In 2011, the Christian Democratic People's Party (CVP/PDC) began gathering signatures for a popular initiative entitled "For the couple and the family - No to the penalty of marriage" (German: Für Ehe und Familie - gegen die Heiratsstrafe; French: Pour le couple et la famille - Non à la pénalisation du mariage; Italian: Per il matrimonio e la famiglia - No agli svantaggi per le coppie sposate; Romansh: Per la lètg e la famiglia - Na als dischavantatgs per pèrs maridads). This initiative sought to amend article 14 of the Swiss Federal Constitution to equalise fiscal rights and social security benefits between married couples and unmarried cohabiting couples. However, the text would have also introduced a definition of marriage for the first time, specifically the "sole union between a man and a woman". Under Swiss law, cohabiting unmarried couples are entitled to two full pensions. However, the pension of married couples is limited to 150% of the maximum pension per person, meaning that if both partners earn relatively well during their working life, they receive only one and a half times the maximum pension instead of two full pensions.

In November 2012, signature gathering ended and the initiative was submitted. The Federal Council reviewed the initiative and decided to support it, formally asking Parliament in October 2013 to recommend that voters approve the initiative. On 10 December 2014, the National Council discussed the initiative. The Greens proposed to amend the bill stating that "any forms of unions" could not be penalised and the Green Liberals proposed to amend the bill so that "marriage and all the other forms of union defined by the law" could not be penalised. The debate opposed mainly the Swiss People's Party and the Christian Democrats to the Green Liberals, the Greens, the Social Democrats and the Conservative Democrats. The Liberals were mostly divided on the issue. The Swiss People's Party and the Christian Democrats stated their opposition to "any form of homophobia". On the other hand, the opposing parties highlighted the discrimination that would be introduced by the initiative and called for a future definition of marriage that would include same-sex couples. Some MPs called the Christian Democrats a "retrograde" party.

After having rejected both counter-propositions from the Greens and the Green Liberals, the National Council finally approved a suggestion from the Commission for Economic Affairs and Taxation, which retained the spirit of the initiative but removed the definition of marriage as exclusively between a man and a woman. This counter-proposition was approved 102–86, thus rejecting the popular initiative and recommending to the Swiss electorate to reject the initiative and accept the counter-proposition. The Council of States approved the counter-proposition on 4 March 2015 in a 24–19 vote. The debate in the upper house also mainly focused on the definition of marriage, though the idea of equal fiscal rights and equal social security benefits between married couples and unmarried cohabiting couples was unopposed. A few Liberal members changed their mind, and the counter-proposition was rejected in the Council of States in a later vote. A subsequent conciliation conference in June 2015 of both chambers of Parliament decided to recommend rejecting the original initiative. On 19 June 2015, the formal order of Parliament recommending voters to reject the initiative was published. On 17 November 2015, the Federal Council also recommended rejecting the initiative. It had supported the initiative two years earlier, but now was obliged to change its position because Parliament was opposed.

==== Referendum ====
The Christian Democrats' proposal was put to a referendum on 28 February 2016, with voters deciding whether to define marriage as a "durable cohabitation of a man and a woman" that "must not be disadvantaged in comparison of other lifestyles", thus prohibiting same-sex marriage in the Swiss Federal Constitution. Amongst parliamentary parties, the Christian Democrats (apart from the Young Christian Democrats of Zurich and Geneva, which had declared opposition to the initiative of their parent party), the national-conservative Swiss People's Party and the conservative Evangelical People's Party campaigned for a "Yes" vote. Meanwhile, the Social Democrats, the Liberals, the Greens, the Conservative Democrats and the Green Liberals opposed the text and campaigned for a "No" vote, along with Amnesty International, Economiesuisse, the Swiss Federation of Trade Unions and Operation Libero. A month before the vote, various polls showed 67% support (22 January 2016) and 53% support (17 February 2016). On 28 February 2016, the initiative was rejected by 50.8% of voters, with 1,609,328 in favor and 1,664,217 against, a margin of 54,979 votes. A majority of cantons approved the initiative (16.5 to 6.5), with the cantons of Geneva, Vaud, Bern, Zurich, Grisons, Basel-Stadt, Basel-Landschaft and Appenzell Ausserrhoden opposing the initiative.

During the referendum campaign, the Swiss Government informed voters that about 80,000 married couples were paying more tax than unmarried cohabiting couples, but later admitted that the true figure was almost half a million. The Christian Democratic Party filed a complaint in June 2018. On 10 April 2019, the referendum was declared invalid by the Federal Supreme Court, which ordered a re-vote. Days later, it was reported that a majority of the parliamentary bloc of the Christian Democratic Party opposed the initiative in its current form and wanted the definition of marriage to be removed. According to the Tages-Anzeiger, the party was hoping that the Parliament would propose an alternative measure to eliminate the tax discrimination against married couples, so the party could withdraw its initiative without losing face.

It was subsequently reported that the referendum would not be rerun as the Federal Council could either set a date for a new referendum, or establish a new law to go through the Federal Parliament. In the latter scenario, the Christian Democrats would have had the opportunity to withdraw their initiative, which was the party's preferred option. The vice-president of the party, Charles Juillard, said, "The party is ready to withdraw its initiative if the Federal Council puts an end to the tax penalty of marriage and the discrimination of spouses vis-à-vis the AVS [Old-age and survivors' insurance]." In early January 2020, the party chose to withdraw its initiative and announced it would begin collecting signatures for a second popular initiative. This initiative would again seek to equalise fiscal rights and social security benefits between married couples and unmarried cohabiting couples, but, unlike the previous one, it would not introduce a specific definition of marriage.

=== Parliamentary initiative "Marriage for All" ===
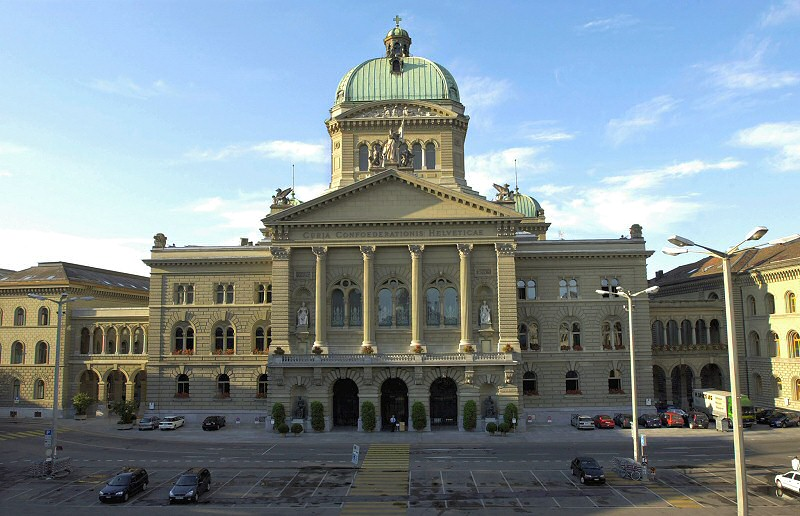
The Federal Palace in Bern houses the Swiss Federal Assembly.

==== Parliamentary deliberations ====
The first legislative proposal to legalise same-sex marriage was introduced by Greens MP Ruth Genner in December 1998. The National Council tabled the measure in December 1999.

In December 2013, the Green Liberal Party submitted a parliamentary initiative, "Marriage for All" (German: Ehe für alle, pronounced [ˈeːɛ fyːr ˈalɛ]; French: Mariage pour tous, pronounced [maʁjaʒ puʁ tus]; Italian: Matrimonio per tutti, pronounced [matriˈmɔːnjo per ˈtutti]; Romansh: Lètg per tuts, pronounced [lɛtɕ pɛr tuts]), for a constitutional amendment to legalise same-sex marriage. On 20 February 2015, the Committee for Legal Affairs of the National Council voted to proceed with the initiative, by 12 votes to 9 with 1 abstention. A petition supporting the measure was launched in May 2015. The signatures were submitted to the Legal Affairs Committee of the Council of States before it discussed the proposal, hoping to persuade the committee members to support it. On 1 September 2015, the committee voted by 7 votes to 5 to proceed with the initiative. The National Council's Legal Affairs Committee was then tasked to draft an act within two years (per Article 111 of the Constitution), i.e. by 2017. However, due to the complexity of the legal reform, it proposed on 11 May 2017 to extend the initiative's deadline by another two years (i.e. by 2019) and ask the government administration for further study of the issue. A minority consisting of the Swiss People's Party wanted to block the initiative. On 16 June 2017, the National Council voted by 118–71 in favour of the committee's proposal to extend the deadline to 2019.

The Legal Affairs Committee published its report on 17 May 2018, the International Day Against Homophobia. The committee recommended amending the Swiss Civil Code to remove the heterosexual definition of marriage and insert a gender-neutral definition. It also recommended amendments to the 1953 civil registration law, which defined marriage as being "between a man and a woman", as well as to other laws, including laws relating to naturalisation. According to the committee and the Federal Department of Justice and Police, the proposal would automatically legalise joint adoption by married same-sex couples. As such, the committee recommended no changes to adoption law, which allows married couples to adopt without explicitly defining the term "marriage". On 6 July 2018, the committee voted against rejecting the initiative altogether, by 18–1, and subsequently voted to recommend the Federal Parliament to approve the initiative by 14 votes to 11. The committee concluded that the legalisation of same-sex marriage did not require amending the Swiss Federal Constitution, and that it could be achieved through changes to statutory law. Therefore, the Swiss electorate would not necessarily be called to vote on the initiative (though opponents could still force a referendum on the issue, which would require a simple majority of those voting to succeed). Despite opposition from LGBT groups, the committee decided not to include the right of lesbian couples to access assisted reproductive technology so that the initiative would have a higher chance of approval. In early July 2018, Operation Libero began collecting signatures in favour of same-sex marriage to persuade Parliament to legalise it, collecting 30,000 signatures within a week.

On 14 February 2019, the committee approved the bill to allow same-sex marriage by 19 to 4 with one abstention. It was sent out for public consultation. The bill would end registered partnerships, and couples would be able to convert their partnerships into marriages. The consultation started on 14 March and lasted until 21 June 2019. It showed wide support for the legalisation of same-sex marriage among all main political parties, with the exception of the Swiss People's Party, and among 22 of the 26 cantonal governments. In January 2020, the Federal Council expressed its support for the same-sex marriage bill. On 11 June 2020, the National Council approved the bill with amendments allowing access to fertility treatments for lesbian couples in a 132–52 vote. The bill was supported by the Social Democrats, the Liberals, the Greens, the Green Liberals and the Conservative Democrats, while the Swiss People's Party was mostly opposed. The Christian Democrats announced they would support the bill if access to fertility treatments for lesbian couples was excluded. The bill passed the Council of States on 1 December 2020 with some minor amendments concerning fertility treatments, by a vote of 22–15 with 7 abstentions. It narrowly defeated, 22 to 20, a motion that would have required a constitutional amendment (which would have delayed the bill by years and mandated a referendum requiring a double majority of the people and the cantons). On 9 December, the National Council approved the changes made by the Council of States by 133 votes to 57 with 1 abstention. The final vote in both chambers took place on 18 December. The Council of States approved the bill by 24 votes to 11 with 7 abstentions, and the National Council approved it by 136 votes to 48 with 9 abstentions.

18 December 2020 vote in the National Council
Party	Voted for	Voted against	Abstained	Absent (Did not vote)
Swiss People's Party	14: Céline Amaudruz; Martina Bircher; Lars Guggisberg; Diana Gutjahr; Thomas Hurter; Christian Imark; Jacques Nicolet; Pierre-André Page; Nadja Pieren; Lukas Reimann; Sandra Sollberger-Muff; Barbara Steinemann; Hans-Ueli Vogt; Walter Wobmann	33: Jean-Luc Addor; Thomas Aeschi; Roland Büchel; Thomas Burgherr; Thomas de Courten; Marcel Dettling; Yvette Estermann; Andrea Geissbühler; Benjamin Giezendanner; Andreas Glarner; Jean-Pierre Grin-Hofmann; Frank Grüter; Martin Haab; Stefanie Heimgartner; Verena Herzog; Erich Hess; Alois Huber; Peter Keller; Roger Köppel; Piero Marchesi; Thomas Matter; Yves Nidegger; Albert Rösti; Monika Rüegger; Franz Ruppen; Gregor Rutz; Therese Schläpfer; Pirmin Schwander; Manuel Strupler; Mauro Tuena; Erich von Siebenthal; Bruno Walliser; David Zuberbühler	5: Michaël Buffat; Mike Egger; Esther Friedli; Alfred Heer; Magdalena Martullo-Blocher	–
Social Democratic Party	36: Matthias Aebischer; Mustafa Atici; Jacqueline Badran; Samuel Bendahan; Prisca Birrer-Heimo; Brigitte Crottaz; Christian Dandrès; Laurence Fehlmann Rielle; Yvonne Feri; Pierre-Alain Fridez; Claudia Friedl; Edith Graf-Litscher; Barbara Gysi; Baptiste Hurni; Beat Jans; Sandra Locher Benguerel; Pierre-Yves Maillard; Ada Marra; Min Li Marti; Samira Marti; Mattea Meyer; Fabian Molina; Martina Munz; Roger Nordmann; Eric Nussbaumer; Valérie Piller Carrard; Jon Pult; Mathias Reynard; Franziska Roth; Ursula Schneider Schüttel; Prisca Seiler Graf; Bruno Storni; Gabriela Suter; Flavia Wasserfallen; Cédric Wermuth; Céline Widmer	–	–	3: Angelo Barrile; Tamara Funiciello; Nadine Masshardt
FDP. The Liberals	29: Frédéric Borloz; Jacques Bourgeois; Rocco Cattaneo; Damien Cottier; Simone de Montmollin; Jacqueline de Quattro; Marcel Dobler; Christoph Eymann; Alex Farinelli; Olivier Feller; Doris Fiala; Kurt Fluri; Anna Giacometti; Petra Gössi; Matthias Jauslin; Christian Lüscher; Christa Markwalder; Isabelle Moret; Philippe Nantermod; Hans-Peter Portmann; Maja Riniker; Regine Sauter; Daniela Schneeberger; Andri Silberschmidt; Susanne Vincenz-Stauffacher; Albert Vitali; Beat Walti; Christian Wassfallen; Laurent Wehrli	–	–	–
Green Party	28: Gerhard Andrey; Sibel Arslan; Christine Badertscher; Kilian Baumann; Daniel Brélaz; Florence Brenzikofer; Christophe Clivaz; Kurt Egger; Fabien Fivaz; Bastien Girod; Balthasar Glättli; Greta Gysin; Irène Kälin; Delphine Klopfenstein Broggini; Sophie Michaud Gigon; Isabelle Pasquier-Eichenberger; Léonore Porchet; Katharina Precliz-Huber; Valentine Python; Franziska Ryser; Regula Rytz; Marionna Schlatter; Meret Schneider; Michael Töngi; Aline Trede; Nicolas Walder; Manuela Weichelt-Picard; Felix Wettstein	–	–	–
Christian Democratic People's Party	9: Marianne Binder-Keller; Ida Glanzmann-Hunkeler; Philipp Kutter; Vincent Maitre; Stefan Müller-Altermatt; Marie-France Roth Pasquier; Elisabeth Schneider-Schneiter; Simon Stadler; Priska Wismer-Felder	11: Philipp Matthias Bregy; Martin Candinas; Alois Gmür; Jean-Paul Gschwind; Sidney Kamerzin; Christian Lohr; Leo Müller; Thomas Rechsteiner; Fabio Regazzi; Benjamin Roduit; Marco Romano	4: Ruth Humbel; Nicolo Paganini; Gerhard Pfister; Markus Ritter	1: Christine Bulliard-Marbach
Green Liberal Party	15: Martin Bäumle; Judith Bellaïche; Kathrin Bertschy; Thomas Brunner; Isabelle Chevalley; Katja Christ; Roland Fischer; Beat Flach; Corina Gredig; Jörg Mäder; Michel Matter; Melanie Mettler; Tiana Angelina Moser; François Pointet; Barbara Schaffner	–	–	1: Jürg Grossen
Conservative Democratic Party	3: Lorenzo Hess; Martin Landolt; Heinz Siegenthaler	–	–	–
Evangelical People's Party	–	3: Niklaus-Samuel Gugger; Marianne Streiff; Lilian Studer	–	–
Federal Democratic Union	–	1: Andreas Gafner	–	–
Solidarity	–	–	–	1: Stefania Prezioso
Swiss Party of Labour	1: Denis de la Reussille	–	–	–
Ticino League	1: Lorenzo Quadri	–	–	–
Total (Note: The presidents of the National Council and the Council of States, Andreas Aebi and Alex Kuprecht respectively, vote only in case of a tied vote.)	136	48	9	6
Total	68.3%	24.1%	4.5%	3.0%

18 December 2020 vote in the Council of States
Party	Voted for	Voted against	Abstained	Absent (Did not vote)
Christian Democratic People's Party	4: Erich Ettlin (OW); Andrea Gmür-Schönenberger (LU); Brigitte Häberli-Koller (TG); Charles Juillard (JU)	5: Stefan Engler (GR); Daniel Fässler (AI); Peter Hegglin (ZG); Marianne Maret (VS); Beat Rieder (VS)	3: Pirmin Bischof (SO); Benedikt Würth (SG); Heidi Z'graggen (UR)	1: Othmar Reichmuth (SZ)
FDP. The Liberals	7: Philippe Bauer (NE); Thierry Burkart (AG); Andrea Caroni (AR); Olivier Français (VD); Johanna Gapany (FR); Matthias Michel (ZG); Damian Müller (LU)	–	4: Josef Dittli (UR); Thomas Hefti (GL); Martin Schmid (GR); Hans Wicki (NW)	1: Ruedi Noser (ZH)
Social Democratic Party	9: Élisabeth Baume-Schneider (JU); Marina Carobbio Guscetti (TI); Eva Herzog (BS); Daniel Jositsch (ZH); Christian Levrat (FR); Paul Rechsteiner (SG); Carlo Sommaruga (GE); Hans Stöckli (BE); Roberto Zanetti (SO)	–	–	–
Swiss People's Party	–	5: Marco Chiesa (TI); Hannes Germann (SH); Hansjörg Knecht (AG); Werner Salzmann (BE); Jakob Stark (TG)	–	–
Green Party	4: Maya Graf (BL); Lisa Mazzone (GE); Adèle Thorens Goumaz (VD); Mathias Zopfi (GL)	–	–	1: Céline Vara (NE)
Independent	–	1: Thomas Minder (SH)	–	–
Total	24	11	7	3
Total	53.3%	24.4%	15.6%	6.7%

==== Referendum ====
Results of the 2021 same-sex marriage referendum by canton, 26 September 2021

In Switzerland's system of semi-direct democracy, a statute is subject to a popular referendum if opponents collect 50,000 signatures within three months. The right-wing Federal Democratic Union, supported by politicians from the Swiss People's Party and the Christian Democratic People's Party, gathered 61,027 signatures with the slogan "Yes to marriage and family, no to marriage for everyone". The Federal Chancellery validated the signatures on 27 April. In response, Operation Libero launched a counter-campaign and collected more than 100,000 signatures in support of same-sex marriage by late April 2021.

The referendum, in which passage of the bill required a simple majority of the popular vote, took place on Sunday, 26 September 2021. 64.1% of voters and all cantons supported the amendment. The vote made Switzerland the 30th country to introduce same-sex marriage, and one of the last in Western Europe.

Amendment to the Swiss Civil Code (Marriage for All)
Choice	Votes	%
For	1,828,642	64.10
Against	1,024,307	35.90
Total	2,852,949	100.00
Valid votes	2,852,949	98.27
Invalid/blank votes	50,279	1.73
Total votes	2,903,228	100.00
Registered voters/turnout	5,519,168	52.60

Federal Councillor Karin Keller-Sutter announced in a press conference that the legislation approved in the referendum would enter into force on 1 July 2022, and the first same-sex weddings took place on that date.

The legislation amended article 94 of the Swiss Civil Code to read:

- in German: Die Ehe kann von zwei Personen eingegangen werden, die das 18. Altersjahr zurückgelegt haben und urteilsfähig sind.
- in French: Le mariage peut être contracté par deux personnes âgées de 18 ans révolus et capables de discernement.
- in Italian: Per contrarre matrimonio, gli sposi devono aver compiuto il diciottesimo anno d'età ed essere capaci di discernimento.
- in Romansh: Pudair maridar pon duas persunas che han cumplenì il 18avel onn da vegliadetgna e ch'èn ablas da giuditgar.

(To be able to marry, the prospective spouses must have reached 18 years of age and have the capacity of judgement.)

Provisions of the same-sex marriage law relating to the recognition of foreign marriages came into force on 1 January 2022. Same-sex couples who have married abroad will now have their union recognized as a marriage rather than a registered partnership.

=== Impact ===
A 2024 study published in the Proceedings of the National Academy of Sciences of the United States of America showed that LGBT people experienced a notable increase in biological stress levels (i.e. cortisol and cortisone levels) during the 2021 marriage referendum campaign. These effects were, however, moderated by exposure to the "Yes" campaign.

=== Marriage statistics ===
6,964 same-sex marriages had been performed in Switzerland by the end of 2025, mostly in the Zurich, Lake Geneva and Espace Mittelland regions.

Number of marriages performed in Switzerland
Year	Same-sex marriages			Opposite-sex marriages	Total marriages	% same-sex
Year	Male	Female	Total	Opposite-sex marriages	Total marriages	% same-sex
2022	1,750	1,259	3,009	37,929	40,938	7.35%
2023	940	808	1,748	36,015	37,763	4.63%
2024	642	505	1,147	35,622	36,769	3.12%
2025	590	470	1,060	34,853	35,913	2.95%

=== Religious performance ===
Same-sex marriage remains a controversial topic among Switzerland's largest religious organisations: the Protestant Church and the Roman Catholic Church. The Catholic Church does not permit same-sex marriages in its places of worship, while most member churches of the Protestant Church allow their clergy to officiate at same-sex marriages. Some smaller religious denominations also permit same-sex marriages, including Quakers, and the Christian Catholic Church of Switzerland. The former has permitted its priests to perform same-sex marriages since 1 July 2022, and has also allowed blessings of same-sex partnerships since 2007. The Federation of Evangelical Lutheran Churches in Switzerland and the Principality of Liechtenstein does not perform same-sex marriages, but its Geneva church has offered blessings of same-sex partnerships since 2004. The Swiss Federation of Jewish Communities, an umbrella organisation representing a majority of Switzerland's Jewish communities, voted to support civil same-sex marriage in 2019 as a matter of "personal freedom and individual autonomy", while also concluding that a Jewish religious marriage was only "between a man and a woman".

In 2019, the Protestant Church voted to support the opening of civil marriage to same-sex couples, with its executive council voting 45–10 in favor. A majority of member churches allow same-sex marriages to be blessed in their places of worship, including those of Aargau (2022), Appenzell (2022), Basel-Landschaft (2022), Basel-Stadt (2022), Bern-Jura-Solothurn (2023), Freiburg (2022), Geneva (2022), Glarus (2022), Graubünden (2022), Lucerne (2022), Neuchâtel (2022), Nidwalden (2022), Obwalden (2022), St. Gallen (2022), Schaffhausen (2022), Schwyz (2022), Solothurn (2024), Thurgau (2022), Ticino (2022), Valais (2022), Vaud (2022), Zurich (2022), and Zug (2022). Pastors are under no obligation to bless same-sex unions if this would contravene their personal beliefs. Some other member churches, including the Evangelical Free Church of Geneva and the Evangelical-Reformed Church of Uri, do not allow their clergy to bless same-sex marriages.

The Catholic Church opposes same-sex marriage and does not allow its clergy to officiate at such marriages. In October 2014, a Catholic priest blessed a same-sex union in Bürglen. The priest subsequently gave a public apology. In June 2019, the Swiss Union of Catholic Women voted to support the introduction of civil same-sex marriage. In September 2019, the Bishop of Basel, Felix Gmür, announced that the diocese would conduct blessings for same-sex unions "as long as the rites differ from marriage ceremonies". In May 2021, the Catholic News Agency reported that Catholic churches in Zurich had joined churches in many German cities in blessing same-sex couples, in ceremonies known as "blessing services for lovers". In December 2023, the Holy See published Fiducia supplicans, a declaration allowing Catholic priests to bless couples who are not considered to be married according to church teaching, including the blessing of same-sex couples. The Swiss Bishops' Conference released a statement on 19 December that "[t]he declaration Fiducia supplicans testifies that the Church offers a place to all human beings. The bishops are aware that such a Church presupposes acceptance and mutual respect."

== Public opinion ==
According to an Ifop poll conducted in May 2013, 63% of the Swiss public supported allowing same-sex couples to marry and adopt children. After the Legal Affairs Committee's decision to approve same-sex marriage, two opinion polls released on 22 February 2015 showed support of 54% (Léger for Blick) and 71% (gfs group for the SonntagsZeitung) for allowing same-sex couples to marry and adopt children.

A poll carried out between April and May 2016 showed that 69% of the Swiss population supported same-sex marriage, 25% opposed and 6% were unsure. 94% of Green voters, 59% of Swiss People's Party voters and 63% of Christian Democratic voters were in favor of same-sex marriage. A poll conducted by Tamedia on 5 and 6 December 2017 found that 45% of respondents supported both same-sex marriage and adoption, 27% supported only same-sex marriage, 3% supported only same-sex adoption and 24% were against both. The poll thus found a 72% majority in favour of same-sex marriage. Green, Social Democratic and Green Liberal voters were the most supportive: 88% in favour, 9% against and 3% undecided. 76% of Liberal voters supported the legalisation of same-sex marriage, while 22% opposed it, and 66% of Christian Democratic voters and 56% of Swiss People's Party voters supported same-sex marriage.

A Pew Research Center poll, conducted between April and August 2017 and published in May 2018, showed that 75% of Swiss people supported same-sex marriage, 24% were opposed and 1% did not know or had refused to answer. When divided by religion, 89% of religiously unaffiliated people, 80% of non-practicing Christians and 58% of church-attending Christians supported same-sex marriage. Opposition was 16% among 18–34-year-olds. A public consultation held between March and June 2019 showed wide societal and political support for same-sex marriage in Switzerland. 83% of the participants to the consultation expressed support, and 63% expressed support for sperm donation and access to artificial insemination for lesbian couples.

A February 2020 survey, conducted by the gfs group and requested by Pink Cross, found an 81% majority in favour of same-sex marriage (63% "strongly" supporting and 18% "somewhat" supporting), whereas 18% were opposed (10% "strongly" and 8% "somewhat") and 1% was undecided. By party, 96% of Greens, 92% of Social Democrats and Green Liberals, 77% of Liberals and 67% of Swiss People's Party voters supported same-sex marriage. Adoption was supported by 67% of respondents and access to fertility treatments for lesbian couples by 66%. In November 2020, another poll conducted by the gfs group found that 82% of respondents "strongly" or "somewhat" supported same-sex marriage, 17% were opposed and 1% were undecided; 72% supported adoption and 70% supported access to fertility treatments for lesbian couples.

== See also ==
- LGBT rights in Switzerland
- Recognition of same-sex unions in Europe
