= Barbara Haering =

Swiss politician

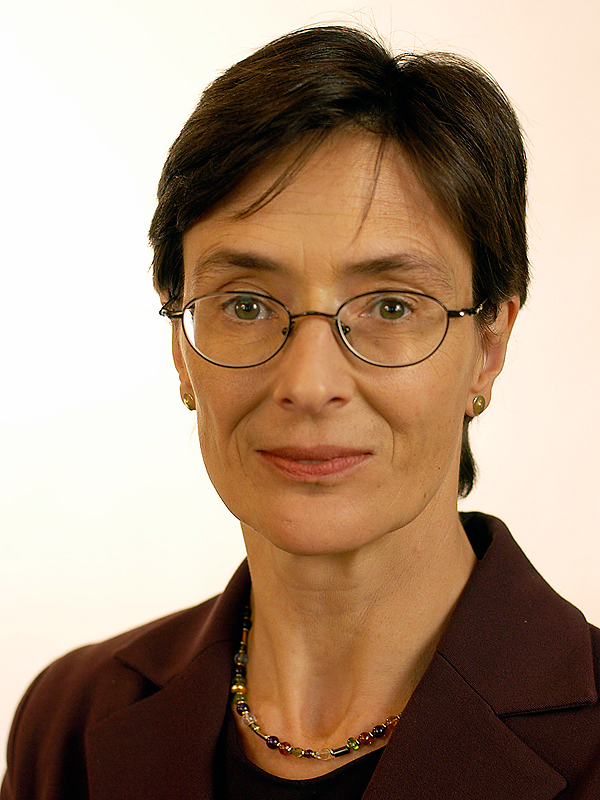

National Council of Switzerland
- In office 5 February 1990 – 2 December 2007
- Preceded by: Doris Morf
- Parliamentary group: Socialist (S)
- Constituency: Zurich

Personal details
- Born: September 20, 1953 (age 72) Montreal, Canada
- Citizenship: Switzerland; Canada
- Party: Social Democratic Party
- Education: ETH Zurich
- Committees: Political Security Commission; Science, Education and Culture Commission (1995-98), Transport and Telecommunications Committee

Barbara Haering (born 20 September 1953 in Montreal, originated from Zurich) is a Swiss politician of Canadian origin, and is member of the Social Democratic Party. She was member of the Swiss National Council between 1990 and 2007, representing Zurich.

== Life ==
Barbara Haering was born on 20 September 1953 in Montreal, Canada, and possesses Canadian citizenship, though her place of origin is Zurich. Her father is a Romand.

Haering was an environmental science student at the ETH Zurich, and obtained her doctorate in 1996.

== Political career ==
She was a member of the Cantonal Council of Zurich between 1979 and 1983, before becoming a member of the Swiss National Council in 1990, preceding Doris Morf after her retirement. During her time in the National Council, she was part of various committees, including the Political Security Commission, the Science, Education and Culture Commission, and the Transport and Telecommunications Committee.
