= Francine John-Calame =

Swiss politician

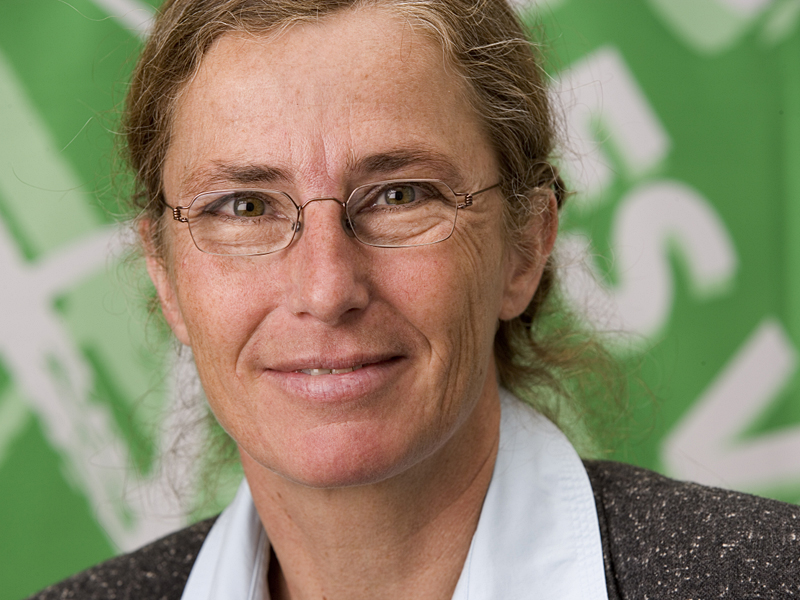
Francine John-Calame

Francine John-Calame (born 30 April 1954) is a Swiss politician from the Canton of Neuchâtel. She was a member of the National Council and the parliament of the Canton of Neuchâtel from 1993 to 2002. She is a municipal councillor in Le Cerneux-Péquignot.

On the list of the Green Party, she acceded to the National Council on 31 May 2005, following the resignation of Fernand Cuche.

Francine John-Calame is married and mother of two.
