= Doris Morf =

Swiss author and politician (1927–2003)

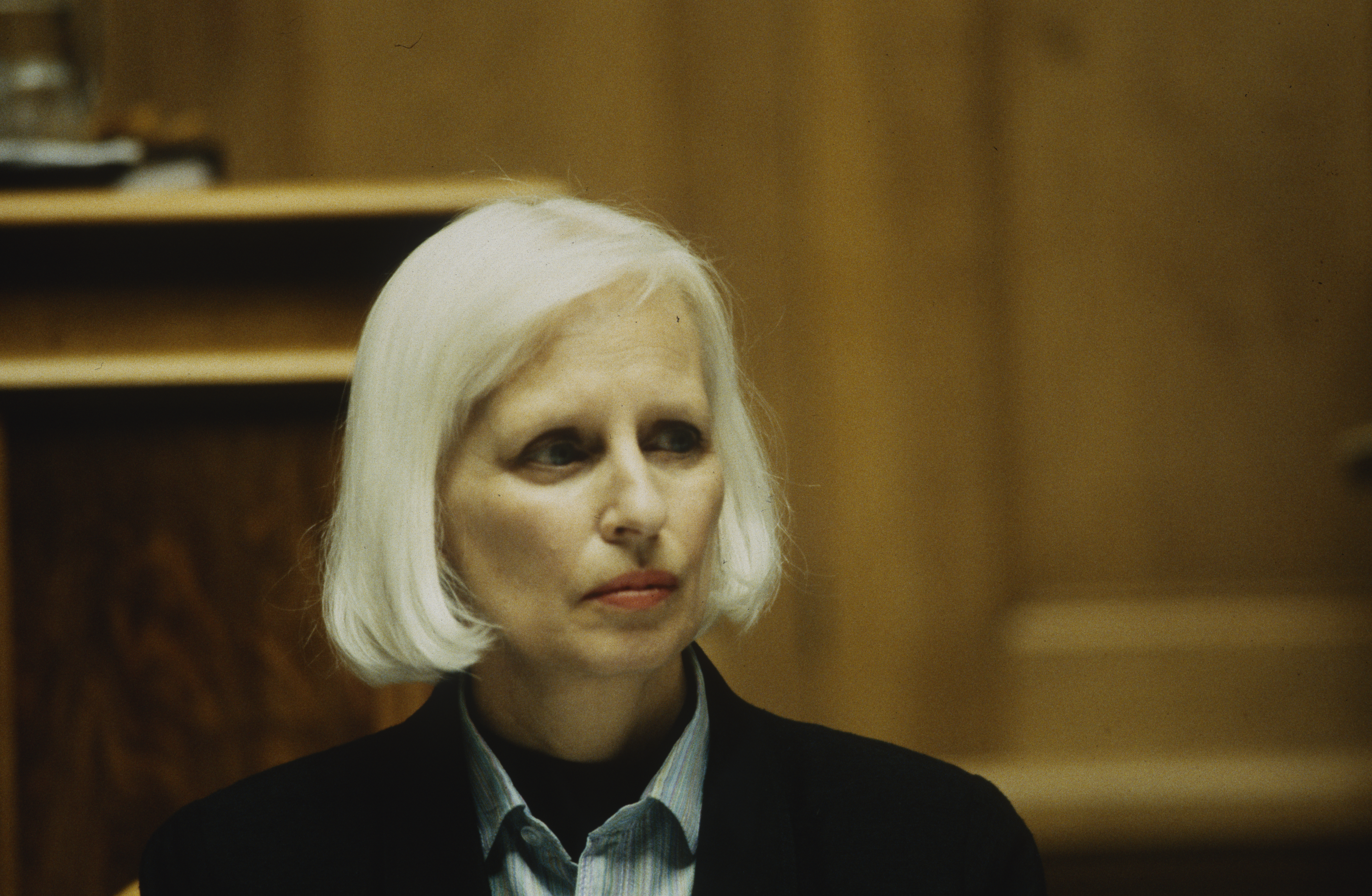
- Born: Doris Keller; 17 September 1927; St. Gallen, Switzerland
- Died: 27 August 2003 (aged 75)
- Occupation: Journalist
- Political party: Social Democratic Party
- Children: 3

Doris Morf (née: Keller; 17 September 1927 – 27 August 2003) was a Swiss author, journalist, and politician. She is known for her novels, screenplays, and children's books. She was one of the early women members of the Swiss National Council.

== Early life and education ==
Doris was born in St. Gallen on 17 September 1927. She studied German language, history and journalism in Zurich.

== Career and activities ==
Doris worked as a journalist in New York City for three years. After returning to Zurich she worked as a publisher between 1960 and 1975. In the mid-1960s she began to publish novels, screenplays, and children's books. She was a municipal councilor for the Social Democratic Party in Zurich from 1970 to 1977. In 1975, she was elected to the National Council being one of the first Swiss women to hold this post. Morf's term ended in 1990. She was a member and vice president of the Parliamentary Assembly of the Council of Europe between 1984 and 1990. She coauthored the political fiction book Hitler auf dem Rütli (German: Hitler on the Rutli) with Charles Lewinsky in 1984.

She served as the president of the education commission of the UNESCO Switzerland during the period between 1992 and 1997. She was elected as the Swiss representation for the executive board of UNESCO in 1993 and held the post until 1997. Doris Morf was a member of the board of trustees of Pro Helvetia Foundation for twelve years.

== Personal life and death ==
She first married Peter Jakob in 1949. Her second husband was the writer André Kaminski with whom she married in 1989. Morf had three children from her first marriage. She died on 27 August 2003 at age 75.

=== Awards ===
She was awarded the Jubilee Prize of the Swiss Lyceum Clubs for her novel Das Haus mit dem Magnolienbaum (1964; The House with the Magnolia Tree). She was recipient of the Zurich City Award in 1966.
