= Erwin Jutzet =

Swiss politician (1951–2025)

Erwin Jutzet (7 May 1951 – 29 November 2025) was a Swiss politician.

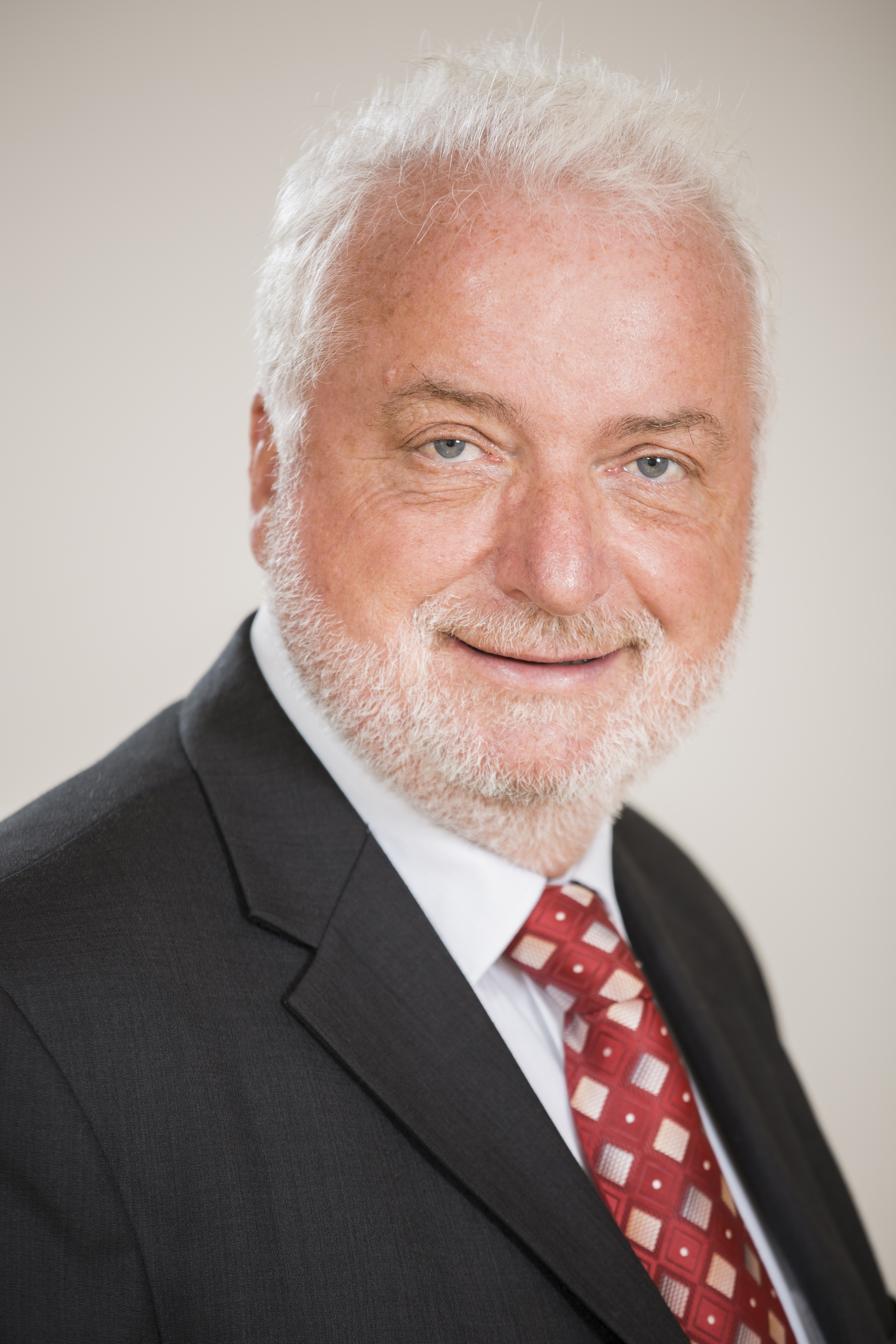
Jutzet in 2012

== Life and career ==
Jutzet was born in Fribourg on 7 May 1951. He was a member of the Social Democratic Party of Switzerland. He was a member of the Grand Council and State Council of the Canton of Fribourg as well as a National Councillor. In 2011, he served as President of the Freiburg State Council.

Jutzet died on 29 November 2025, at the age of 74.
