= Liliane Chappuis =

Swiss politician

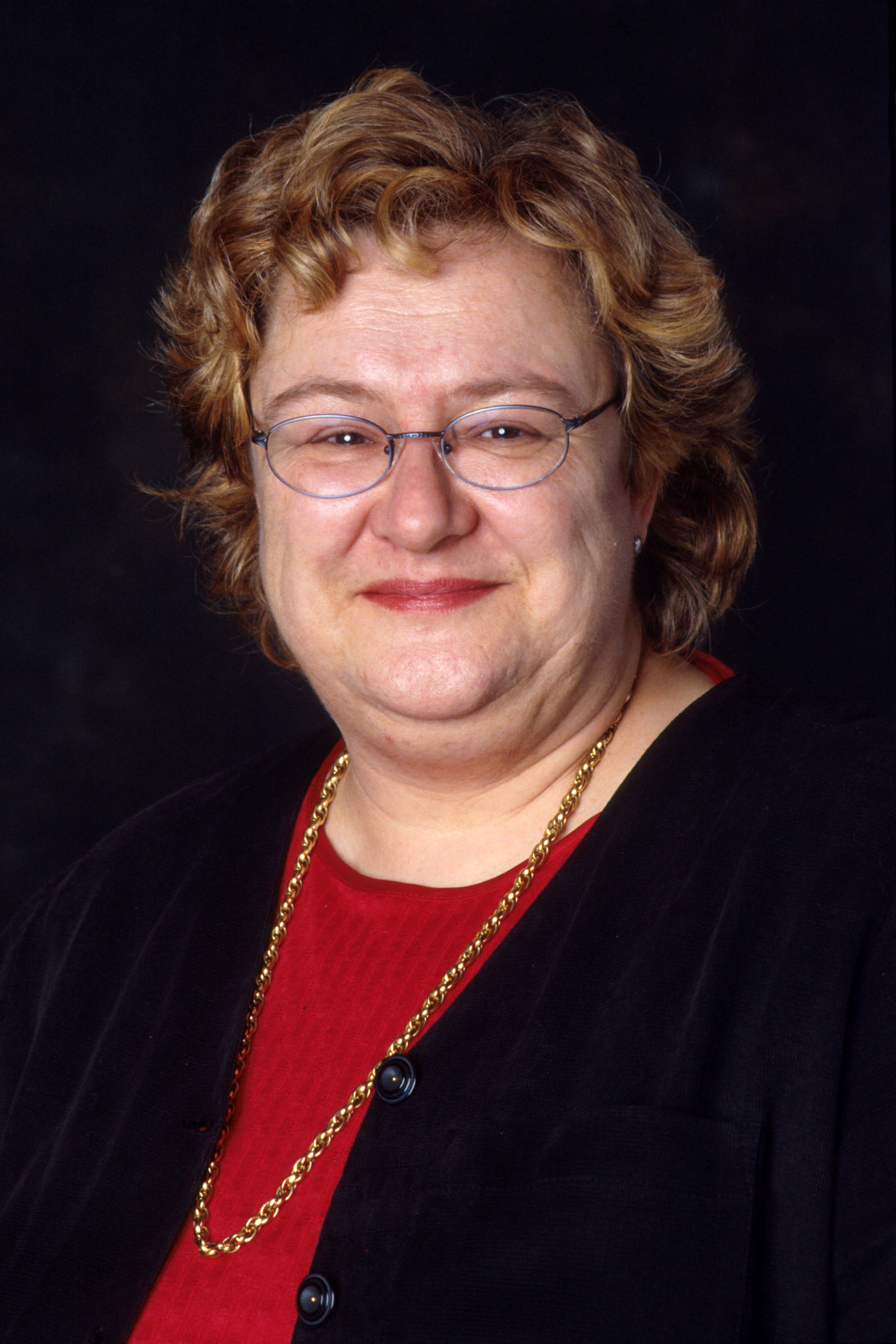

Liliane Chappuis (27 June 1955 in Fribourg – 25 June 2007) was a Swiss politician from the Canton of Fribourg and member of the Swiss National Council (1999–2003 and 2007).

Chappuis was elected to the executive of the municipality of Corpataux-Magnedens in 1986. She was mayor of the village since 1996. From 1990 to 1999 was member of the cantonal parliament of Fribourg.

In 1999, Chappuis was elected to the National Council on the list of the Social Democratic Party of Switzerland (SPS/PSS). She was on the Council's Committee for Science, Education and Culture.

In the 2003 elections, she was not reelected, finishing behind Erwin Jutzet. In 2007, when Jutzet was elected to the Conseil d'État of Fribourg and resigned his seat in parliament, Chappuis succeeded him and returned to the National Council on 5 March 2007.

Chappuis died of a heart attack, two days before her 52nd birthday.
