= Martine Brunschwig Graf =

Swiss politician (born 1950)

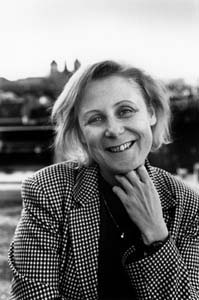
- Brunschwig Graf in 1993

Member of the National Council
- In office 2003–2011
- Constituency: Geneva

Personal details
- Born: 16 March 1950 (age 75) Fribourg, Switzerland
- Party: FDP.The Liberals

Martine Brunschwig Graf (born 16 March 1950 in Fribourg) is a Swiss politician and member of the Swiss National Council for the Canton of Geneva from 2003 to 2011. Her political party is FDP.The Liberals.

Brunschwig Graf was a member of the parliament of the Canton of Geneva from 1989 to 1993; as a member of Liberal Party of Switzerland. On 14 November 1993, she was elected to the Cantonal Government and later re-elected twice in 1997 and 2001. Initially, she headed Geneva's education department: 1993–2001; and thereafter, the finance department: 2003–2005. Brunschwig Graf presided over Geneva cantonal government in 1998/1999 and 2004/2005.

From June 2006 she was President of the Association for the Prevention of Torture and the co-president of the Association for the Promotion of a Swiss Human Rights Institution.

In 2012 she became the President of the Federal Commission against Racism. She held the position for a total of three terms of office until the end of 2023.
