= Caspar Baader =

Swiss politician (born 1953)

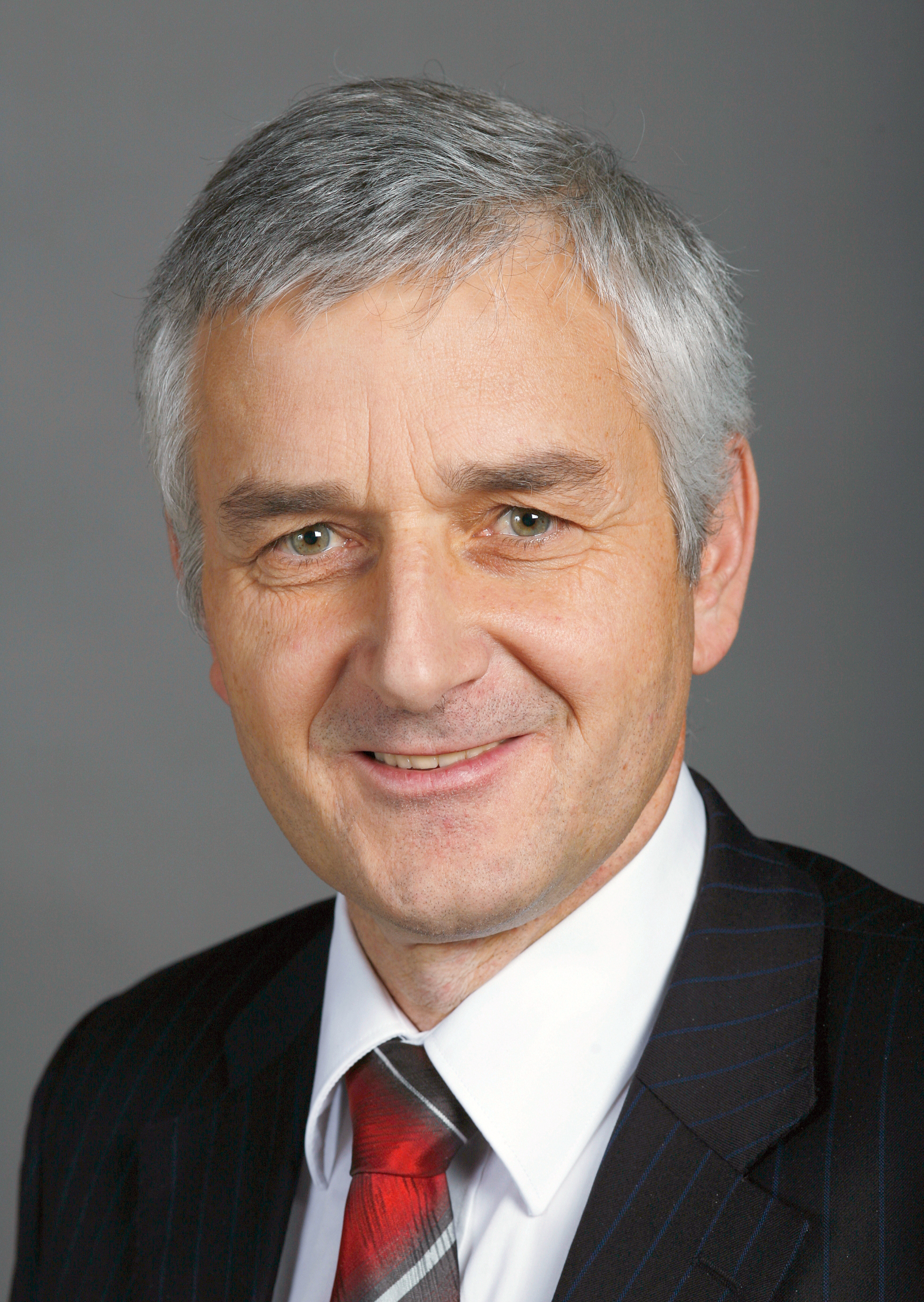
Caspar Baader

Caspar Baader (born 1 October 1953 in Basel) is a Swiss politician, attorney and member of the Swiss National Council from the canton of Basel-Landschaft. Elected in 1998, he is a member of the Swiss People's Party (SVP/UDC).

Baader is married and a father of three.
