= Paul Günter =

Swiss politician (1943–2024)

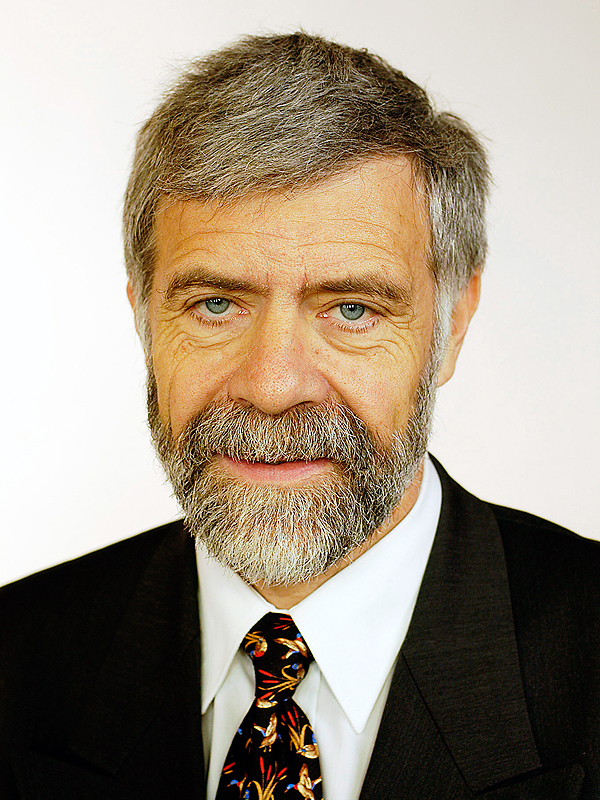

Member of the Swiss National Council
- In office 4 December 1995 – 2 December 2007
- In office 26 November 1979 – 24 November 1991

Member of the Grand Council of Bern
- In office 1972–1979

Personal details
- Born: 30 May 1943 Bern, Switzerland
- Died: 10 January 2024 (aged 80) Bern, Switzerland
- Party: LdU; SP
- Education: University of Bern
- Occupation: Doctor

Paul Günter (30 May 1943 – 10 January 2024) was a Swiss doctor and politician of the Alliance of Independents (LdU) and the Social Democratic Party (SP).

== Biography ==
Born in Bern on 10 May 1943, Günter studied medicine at the University of Bern and graduated in 1969. He became head doctor at a hospital in Interlaken. He then joined the LdU and was elected to the Grand Council of Bern in 1972. He then served in the National Council from 1979 to 1991. He left the LdU and joined the SP, rejoining the National Council in 1995 and serving until 2007.

In 1983, Günter founded the radio station Radio BeO, serving the inhabitants of the Bernese Oberland. He served as longtime president of the station and was a member of the board of directors for life.

Günter died following a long illness in Bern, on 10 January 2024, at the age of 80.
