= Simon Schenk =

Swiss politician (1946–2020)

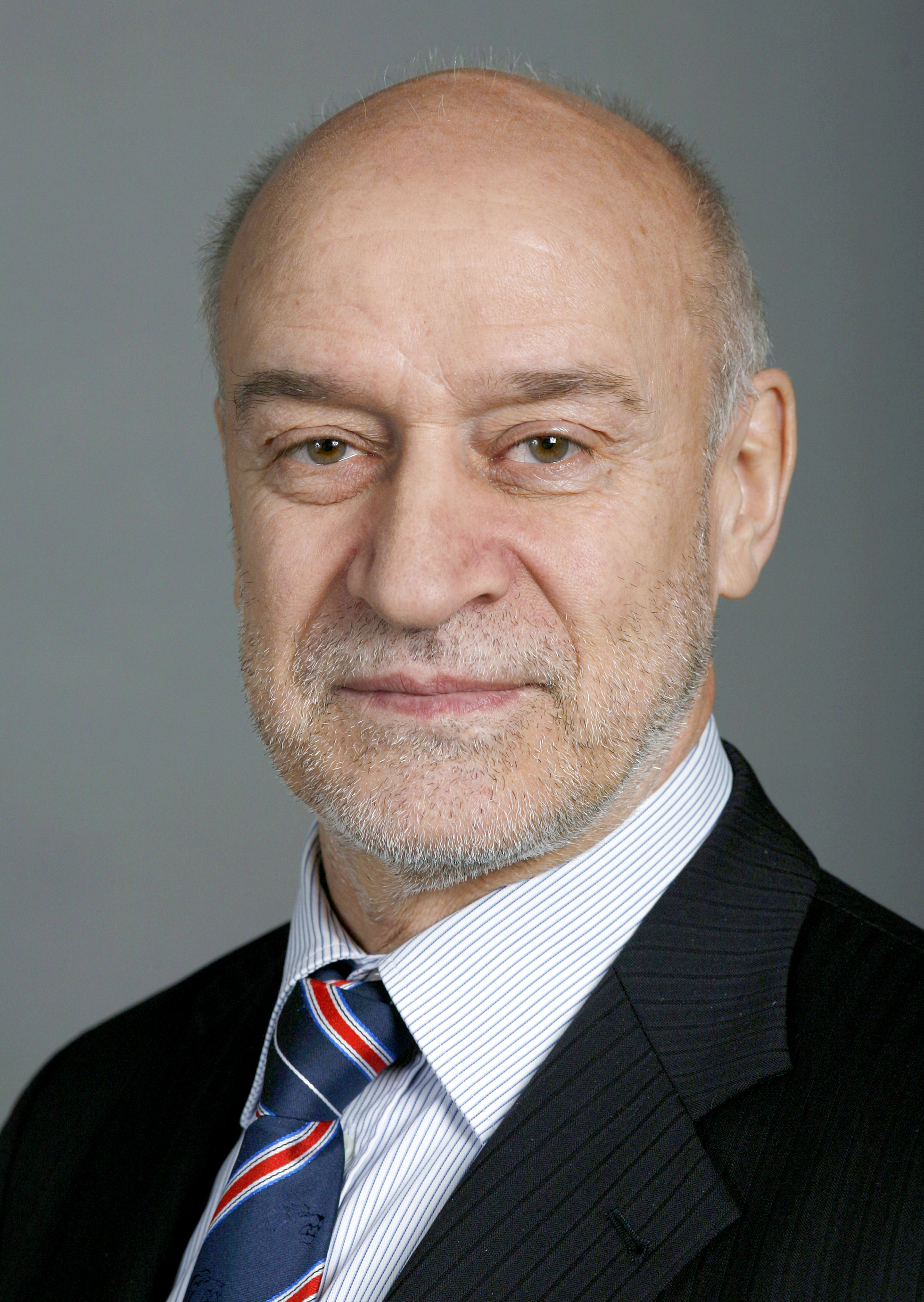

Member of the Swiss National Council for the Canton of Bern
- In office 28 November 1994 – 4 December 2011

Personal details
- Born: 16 May 1946 Langnau im Emmental, Switzerland
- Died: 1 May 2020 (aged 73) Bern
- Party: UDC

Simon Schenk (16 May 1946 – 1 May 2020) was a Swiss politician.

== Biography ==
Schenk served as a member of the National Council from 1994 to 2001, representing the Canton of Bern.

He was also the coach of the Switzerland men's national ice hockey team.
