= Charles Favre =

Swiss sailor

Personal information
- Nationality: Swiss
- Born: 23 January 1961
- Died: 14 May 2015 (aged 54)

Sport
- Sport: Sailing

Charles Favre (23 January 1961 – 14 May 2015) was a Swiss sailor. He competed at the 1984 Summer Olympics and the 1992 Summer Olympics.
