= John Dupraz =

Swiss politician (born 1945)

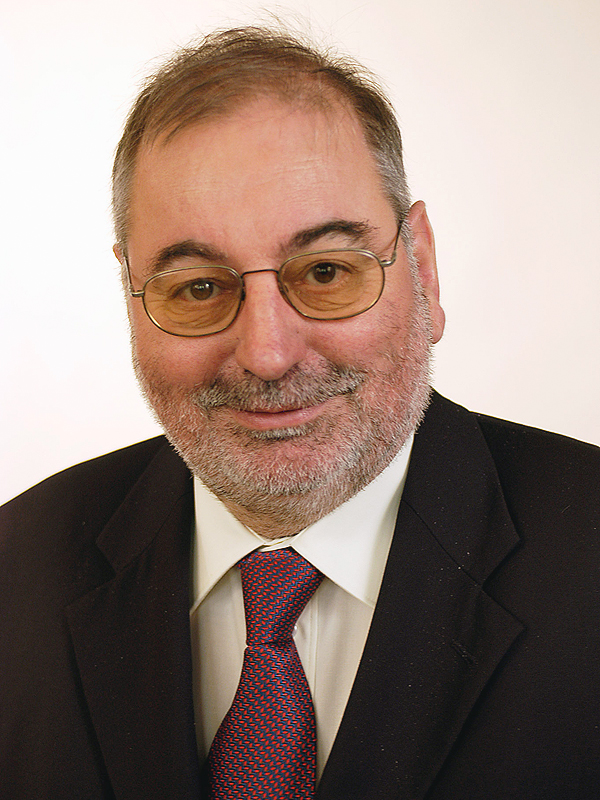
John Dupraz

John Dupraz (born 8 July 1945 in Geneva) is a Swiss politician and member of the National Council from the Canton of Geneva until 2007.

He was a member of the Grand Council of Geneva from October 1973 till October 1989, then again since October 1993. He was elected to the National Council in 1995, on the list of the Free Democratic Party, and to the Parliamentary Assembly of the Council of Europe from 2003 until 2007.
