= Felix Walker (Swiss politician) =

Swiss economist and politician

Felix Walker (born 5 March 1935 in Mörel) is a Swiss economist and politician of the Christian Democratic People's Party (CVP/PDC).

In 1999, Walker was elected to the Swiss National Council in the Canton of St. Gallen. He presided the council's Finance Committee in 2004 and 2005. In December 2006, Walker resigned from the National Council.
