= Daniel Vischer =

Swiss politician

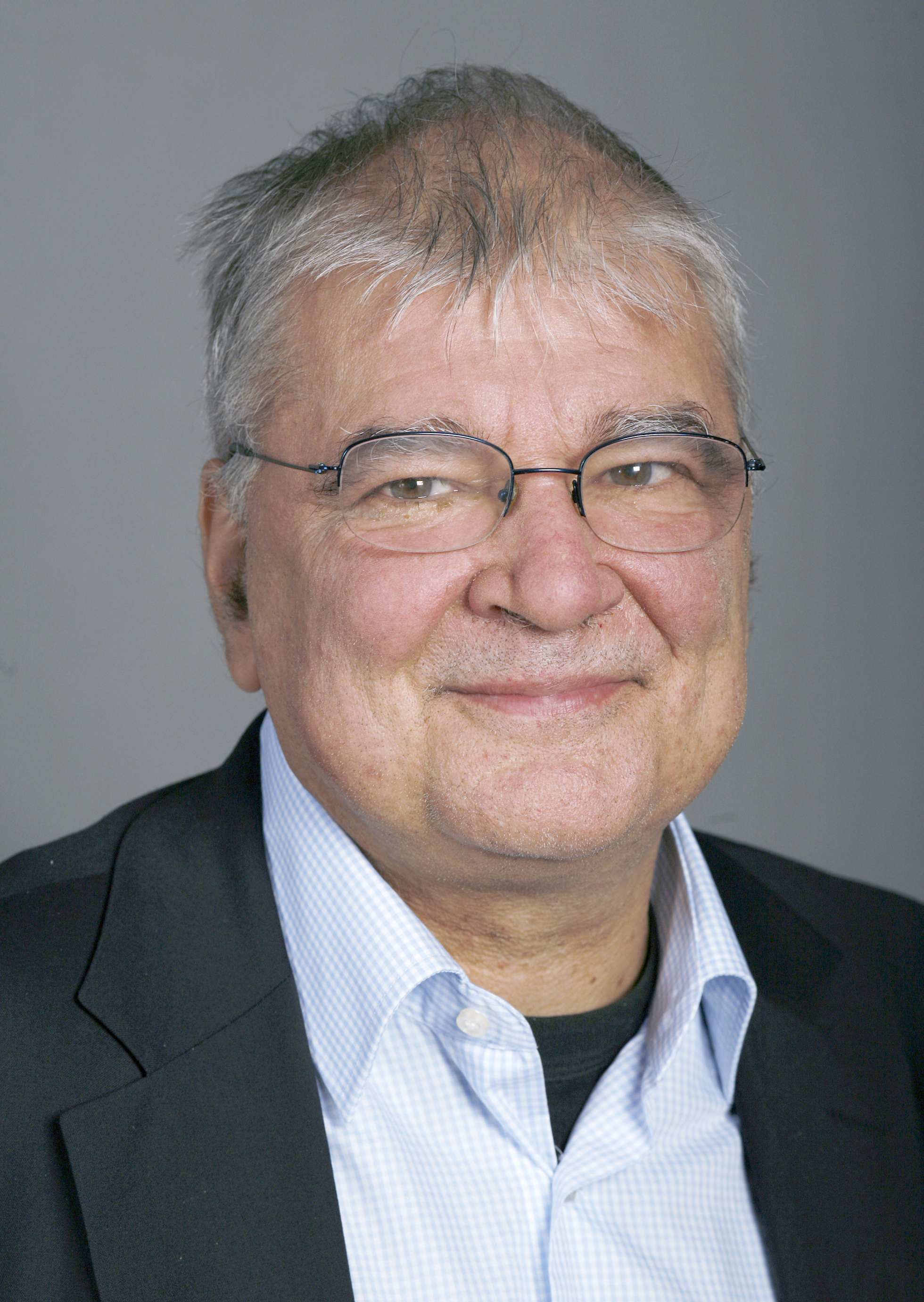
Vischer in 2007

Daniel Vischer (16 January 1950 – 17 January 2017) was a Swiss politician who represented the Green Party. He was elected to the National Council in 2003, and was reelected twice in 2007 and 2011. His term ended in 2015.

Born in Basel, Vischer was the son of jurist Frank Vischer (1923–2015). He was married and had two children.

Vischer died from cancer on 17 January 2017, a day after his 67th birthday, in Zürich.
