= Silvia Schenker =

Swiss politician

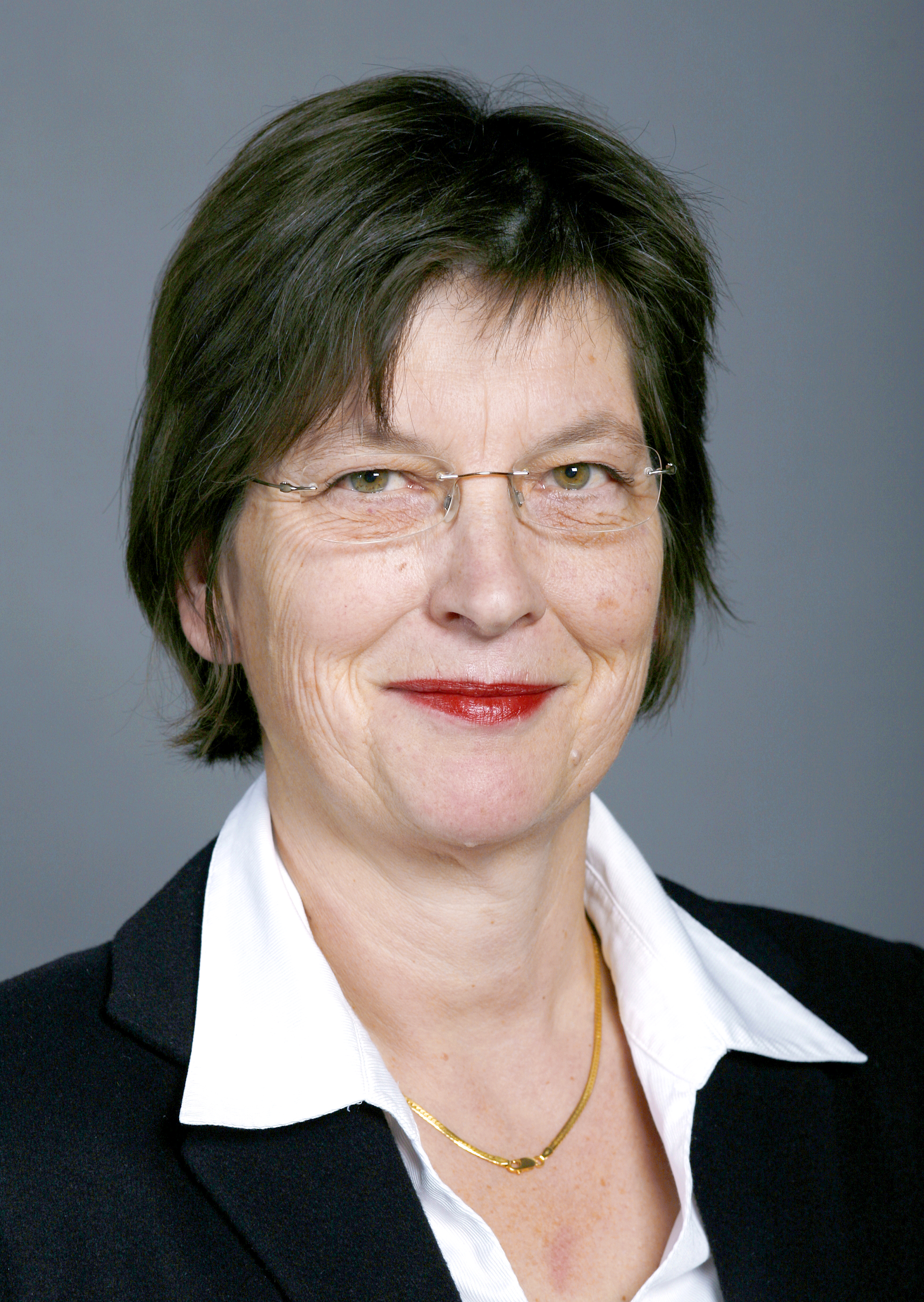
Silvia Schenker

Silvia Schenker (born 17 January 1954 in Aarau, the capital of the canton of Aargau, Switzerland) is a Swiss politician.

She joined the National Council of Switzerland (the lower house of the federal assembly) in 2003 and served until 2019. Schenker was a member of the Commission for Social Security and Health (CSSS). She is a member of the Swiss Socialist Party.

Now a national advisor, she lives in Bâle.
