= Maria Roth-Bernasconi =

Swiss politician

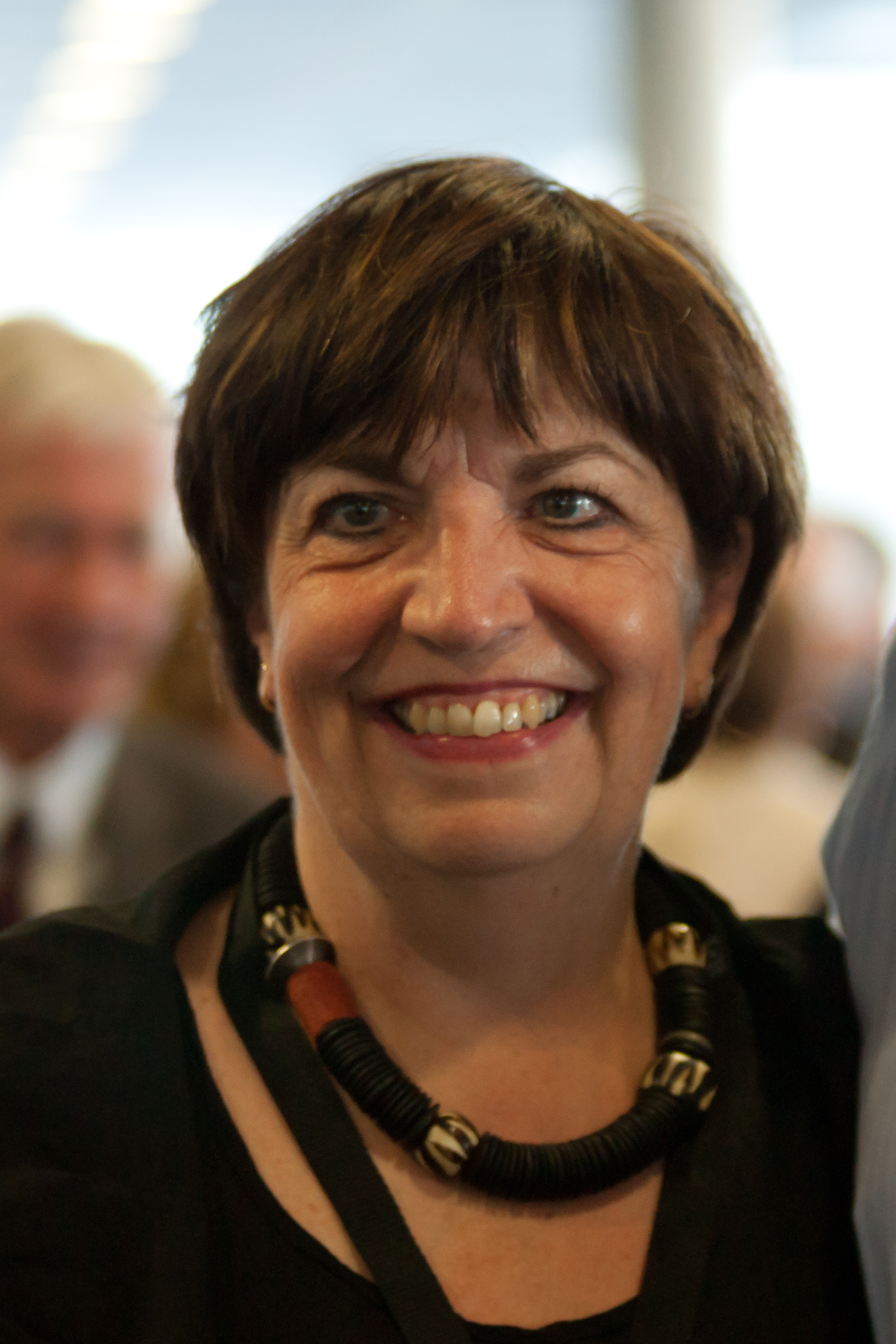
- Born: September 14, 1955 (age 70); Zurich, Switzerland
- Occupation: Politician

Maria Roth-Bernasconi (born 14 September 1955) is a Swiss politician who had served in the legislature and been former co-president of the women's chapter of the Social Democratic Party of Switzerland. As an MP she criticized Micheline Calmy-Rey's wearing a white headscarf to meet the Iranian President.
