= Jacques-Simon Eggly =

Swiss politician

Jacques-Simon Eggly (born September 4, 1942, in Geneva) is a Swiss politician from the canton of Geneva and a member of the Liberal Party of Switzerland. He was a member of the Swiss National Council from 1983 to 2007.

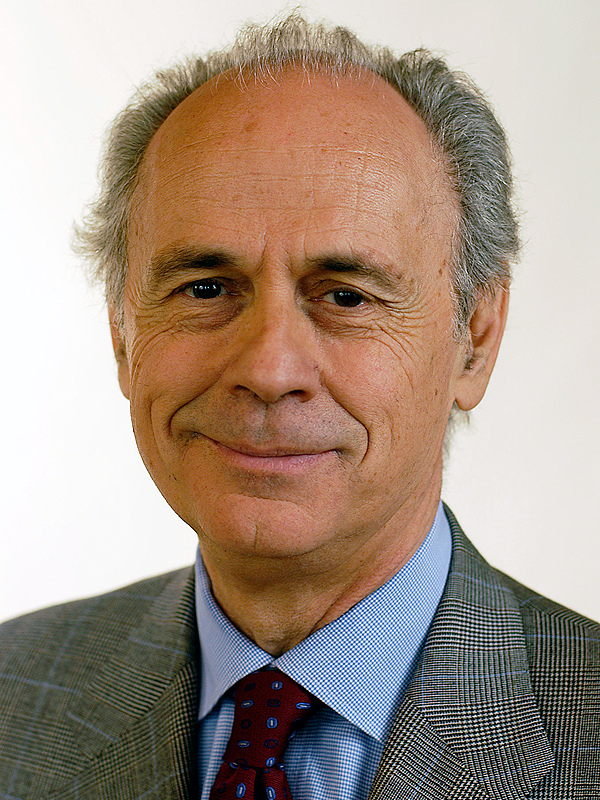
Jacques-Simon Eggly

== Biography ==
Eggly was a journalist and columnist for the Tribune de Genève. He was a member of the Grand Conseil of the canton of Geneva from 1977 to 1983. He was also president of the Liberal Party of Switzerland from 1997 to 2002. In 1983, he was elected to the Swiss National Council where he remained until 2007. During this period, he was co-president of the Swiss-Greece parliamentary group.

He studied law at the University of Geneva and at the Graduate Institute of International Studies in Geneva.

In August 1990, the German television program 10/10 revealed Eggly was among five members of the so-called "resistance council", a group of parliamentarians who, without any mandate from parliament, would have served as an advisory body for the army's chief of staff in the event of the mobilization of that stay-behind army as part of Projekt-26.
