= Hans Kaufmann =

Swiss politician (1948–2026)

Hans Kaufmann (13 June 1948 – 8 June 2026) was a Swiss politician and business consultant. He was a member of the Swiss National Council from 1999 to 2014.

== Early life and political career ==
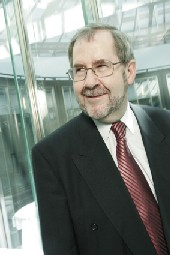
Hans Kaufmann

Hans Kaufmann was born in Ettiswil on 13 June 1948. He was first elected to the Swiss National Council in 1999 as a member of the Swiss People's Party (SVP/UDC) of the Canton of Zurich. In parliament, he was a member of the Committee for Economic Affairs and Taxation (CEAT), the Finance Committee (FC), and the Parliamentary Assembly of the Council of Europe (CE) in Strasbourg. In 2003, Hans Kaufmann was elected with 123,317 votes for the second time. In 2011, he was re-elected for his third term in office. In May 2014, he resigned from the national council due to the "unedifying collaboration with the federal council and some backers on matters related to the Swiss financial center".

== Business career ==
Between 2011 and 2018, he was member of the Board of Directors of Zürcher Kantonalbank. Between 1999 and 2018, Hans Kaufmann was the President of the Board of Directors of Kaufmann Research AG. He consulted on several other boards, particularly within the pension fund sector. Kaufmann was a member of the board of Swissfirst. Prior to that he was employed as Director and Chief Economist at Bank Julius Baer, where he was responsible for investment strategies in Switzerland. From 1986 to 1997 he headed the Department of Swiss Company Research. In addition to his work in this area, Hans Kaufmann has had extensive experience with a variety of brokers, such as Goldman Sachs, Salomon Brothers, and Kidder, Peabody & Co. in New York. He began working with Bank Julius Baer in 1980, after having served as a financial analyst with the Zurich Cantonal Bank (Zürcher Kantonalbank) since 1974. Hans Kaufmann began his career in 1973 as a gold mining analyst in Johannesburg. He had a master's degree in economics from the University of Zurich (lic.oec.publ.).

== Personal life and death ==
From 1976, he was married to Jana Kaufmann with whom he had two children. From 1994, Kaufmann lived and worked in the village of Wettswil am Albis, Switzerland. He was the nephew of the organ player Eduard Kaufmann.

Kaufmann died on 8 June 2026, at the age of 77.
