= Margret Kiener Nellen =

Swiss politician

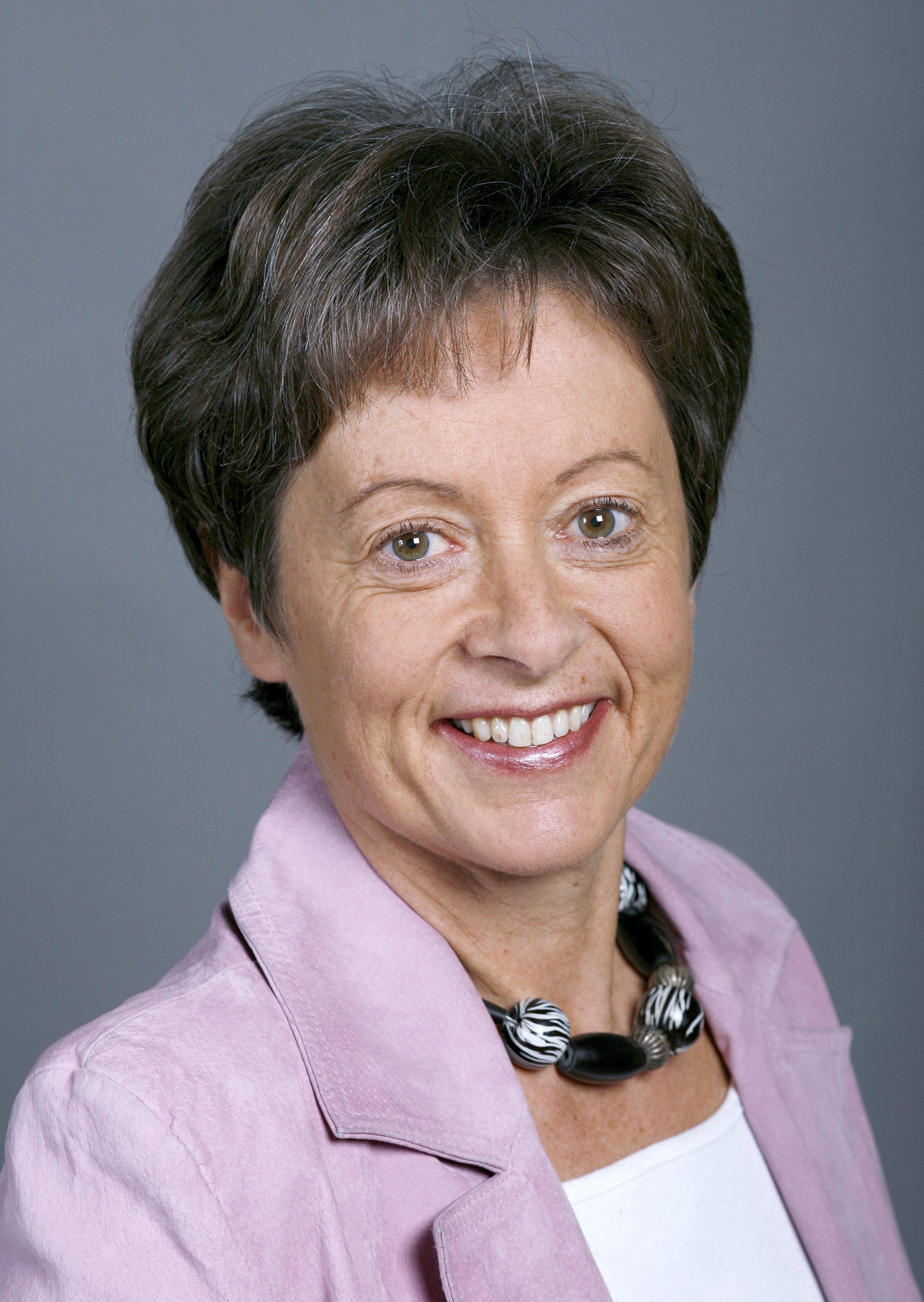
- Margret Kiener Nellen (2007)

Member of the National Council
- In office 1 December 2003 – 1 December 2019

Personal details
- Born: Margareta Kiener; 17 April 1953 (age 73) Bern, Bern, Switzerland
- Party: Social Democratic Party of Switzerland
- Spouse: Alfred Nellen (m. 1982)
- Children: 2
- Education: University of Geneva; University of St. Gallen (licentiate)

Margareta Kiener Nellen known as Margret Kiener Nellen (née Kiener; born 17 April 1953) is a Swiss attorney, translator and former Swiss politician. She served on the Swiss National Council between 2003 and 2019 for the Social Democratic Party of Switzerland (SP).

== Early life and education ==
Margareta Kiener was born on 17 April 1953 in Bern, Switzerland to Otto Kiener (1909-1978) and Ruth (née aus der Au) Kiener as the youngest of three children. Her father, a secondary school teacher, was the mayor of Bolligen and served on the Grand Council of Bern for the Swiss People's Party from 1962 to 1974. She grew-up in the Habstetten section of Bolligen.

Kiener initially attended the University of Geneva, Faculty of Translation and Interpreting and became a diplomaed translator (German, French, English and Italian). Subsequently, she studied commercial law at the University of St. Gallen and graduated in 1981 with a licentiate degree (equivalent to a master's degree).

== Professional career ==
In 1987, she was admitted to the bar in Geneva. Since then she was self-employed and had her own attorney and notary public practice in Bolligen. Since 1 June 2013, she is a partner in the private law practice Kiener & Nellen in Bern.

She has been president of the Bernese Union of Sports Associations (German Vereinigung der Berner Sportverbände) between 2011 and 2019 and is an advisory board member of Swiss Women's Football. Between 2004 and 2016, Kiener-Nellen, was on the board of trustees of Inselspital Bern as well as a board member of the Bernese Education Center for Health Care.

== Politics ==
Kiener-Nellen served on the National Council (Switzerland) between 1 December 2003 and 1 December 2019 for the Social Democratic Party of Switzerland (SP). Her political focus lied on taxation.

She is among Switzerland's richest legislators with an estimated net worth of CHF 12 million (equivalent to $13m). Despite her pro-tax politics she made national headlines about her own tax optimization.

== Personal life ==
Since 1982, Kiener has been married to Alfred Nellen, who is also an attorney. They reside in Habstetten (Bolligen) and have two children.
