= Barbara Marty Kälin =

Swiss politician (1954–2022)

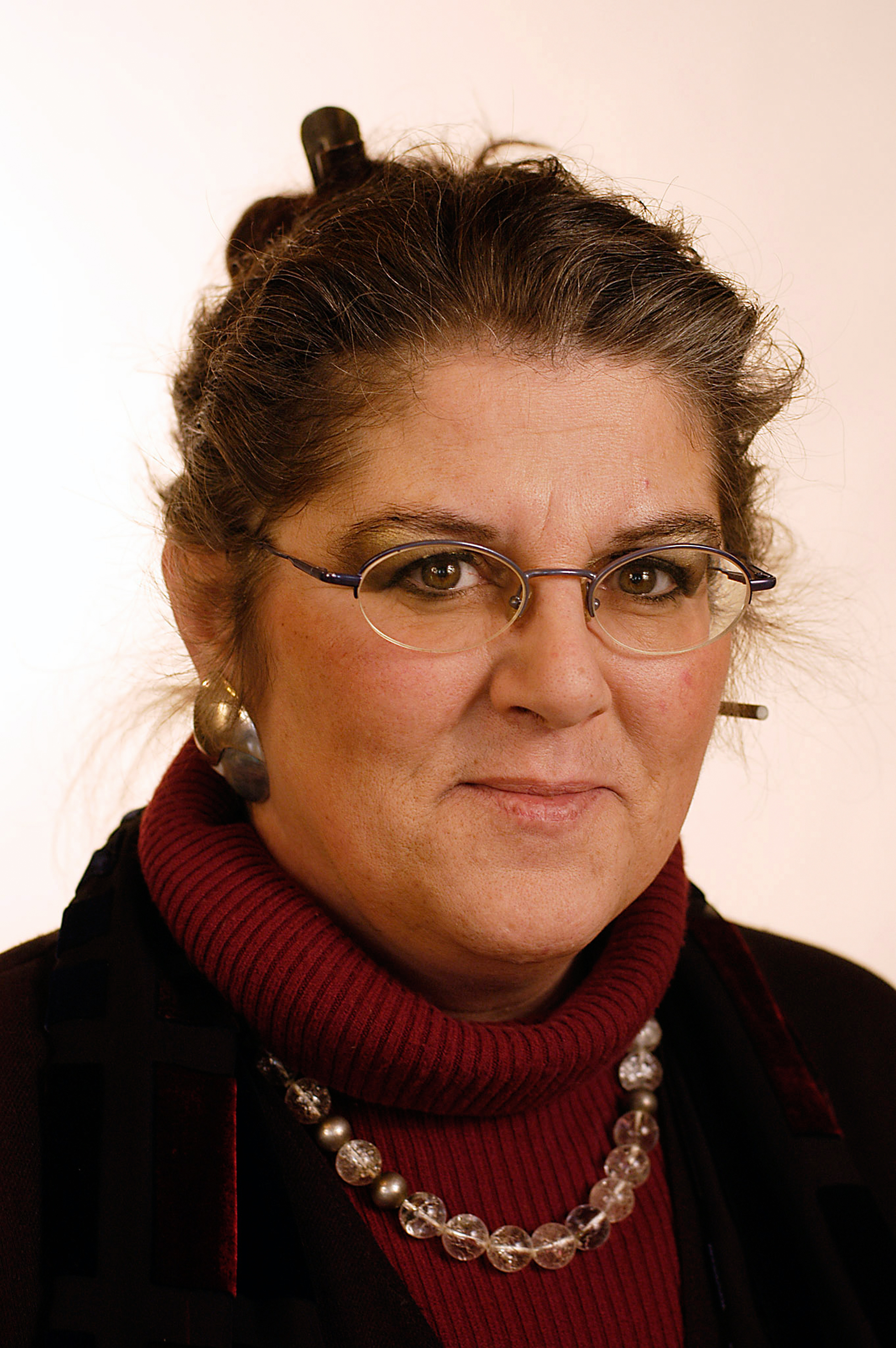
- Kälin in 2003

Member of the Swiss National Council
- In office 5 June 2000 – 2 December 2007

Member of the Cantonal Council of Zürich
- In office 1991–2003

Personal details
- Born: 28 March 1954 Schaffhausen, Switzerland
- Died: 27 November 2022 (aged 68)
- Party: SP

Barbara Marty Kälin (28 March 1954 – 27 November 2022) was a Swiss politician. A member of the Social Democratic Party, she served in the National Council from 2000 to 2007.

Kälin died on 27 November 2022, at the age of 68.
