= Christian Waber =

Swiss politician

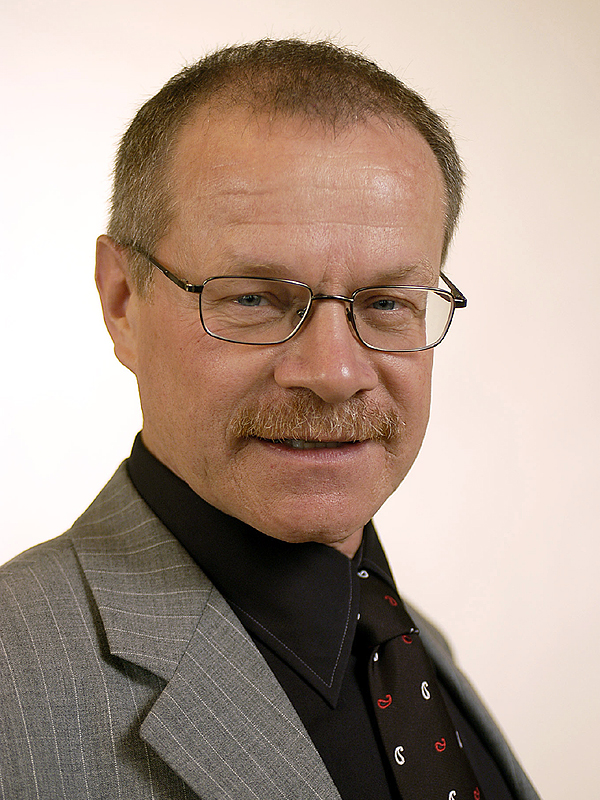

Christian Waber (born 7 May 1948) is a Swiss politician, member of the Federal Democratic Union of Switzerland. He was born in Waldkirch.

Waber has been communal councillor at Wasen, in the Sumiswald commune of Emmental, from 1984 to 1992. From 1990 to 1997, he has held an MP position at the Cantonal Council of Bern.

Waber served as an MP in the National Council of Switzerland from 1997 to 2009, first as a member of the PEV-UDF, and as an independent since 2007. He is the only representative of his party at the National Council.

== Sources and references ==
- Profile on the Federal Assembly website
- Site personnel de Christian Waber
