= Josy Gyr-Steiner =

Swiss politician

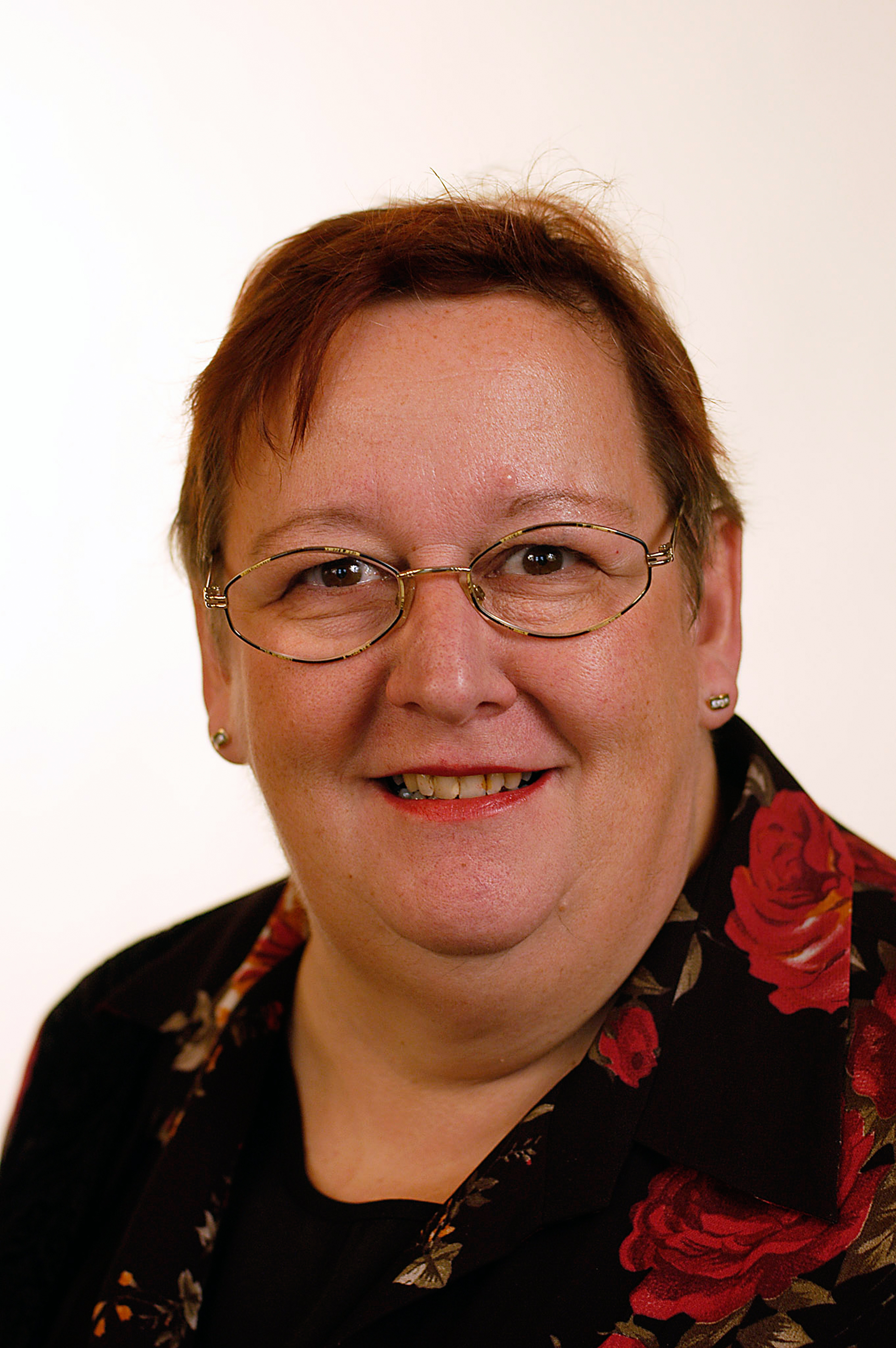
Josy Gyr-Steiner

Josy Gyr-Steiner (10 October 1949, Wädenswil – 18 April 2007) was a Swiss politician from the Canton of Schwyz and member of the Swiss National Council (2003–2007).

In 2003, Gyr was elected to the National Council on the list of the Social Democratic Party of Switzerland (SPS/PSS). She was on the Council's Control Committee and on the Committee for Public Buildings.

Suffering from pancreatic cancer, Gyr resigned on 10 April 2007, and died a few days later.
