= Jost Gross =

Swiss politician

Jost Gross (1 March 1946 – 6 May 2005) was a Swiss politician of the Social Democratic Party. From 1995 to his death he had a seat in the National Council.

Gross was born in Flawil, Switzerland. He was educated as a lawyer and taught at the University of St. Gallen. From 1979 to 1987 he belonged to the executive branch of Steckborn. From 1980 to 1984 he was in the legislative of the canton of Thurgau (Grosser Rat). Also from 1980 to 1984 he was president of the Social Democratic party in Thurgau. He was president of the trade union Thurgau (Gewerkschaftsbund) and Pro Mente Sana since 1994. In 1995 he was elected to the National Council as a representative for Thurgau.

He died while playing football at an international parliamentary tourney in Waldenburg, Baden-Württemberg, Germany.

His successor in the National Council was Edith-Graf Litscher who was sworn in on 30 May 2005.
