= Gerold Bührer =

Swiss politician (born 1948)

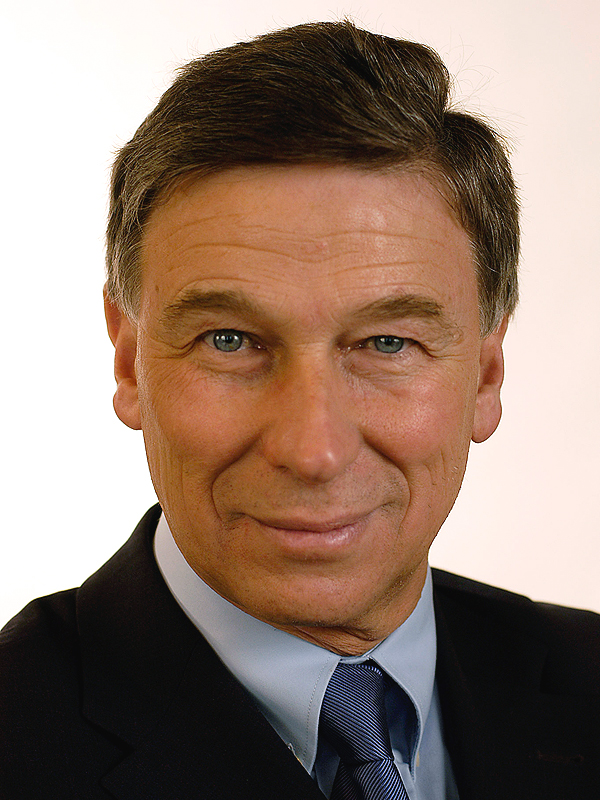
Gerold Bührer

Gerold Bührer (born 23 June 1948) is a Swiss politician and member of the National Council (1991-2007).

Bührer presided the Free Democratic Party (FDP/PRD) in 2001/2002. He was member of the parliament of the Canton of Schaffhausen from 1982 to 1991.

From 1991 to 2000, Bührer was head of Corporate Treasury and Executive Committee member of Georg Fischer AG (CFO).

Bührer is currently a member of the board of directors of Swiss Life (Vice Chairman), Georg Fischer AG, Bank Sal. Oppenheim jr. & Cie. (Schweiz) AG, Cellere AG, Züblin Immobilien Holding AG, as well as a member of a regional advisory board of Deutsche Bank AG.
