= Filippo Leutenegger =

Swiss journalist, economist and politician

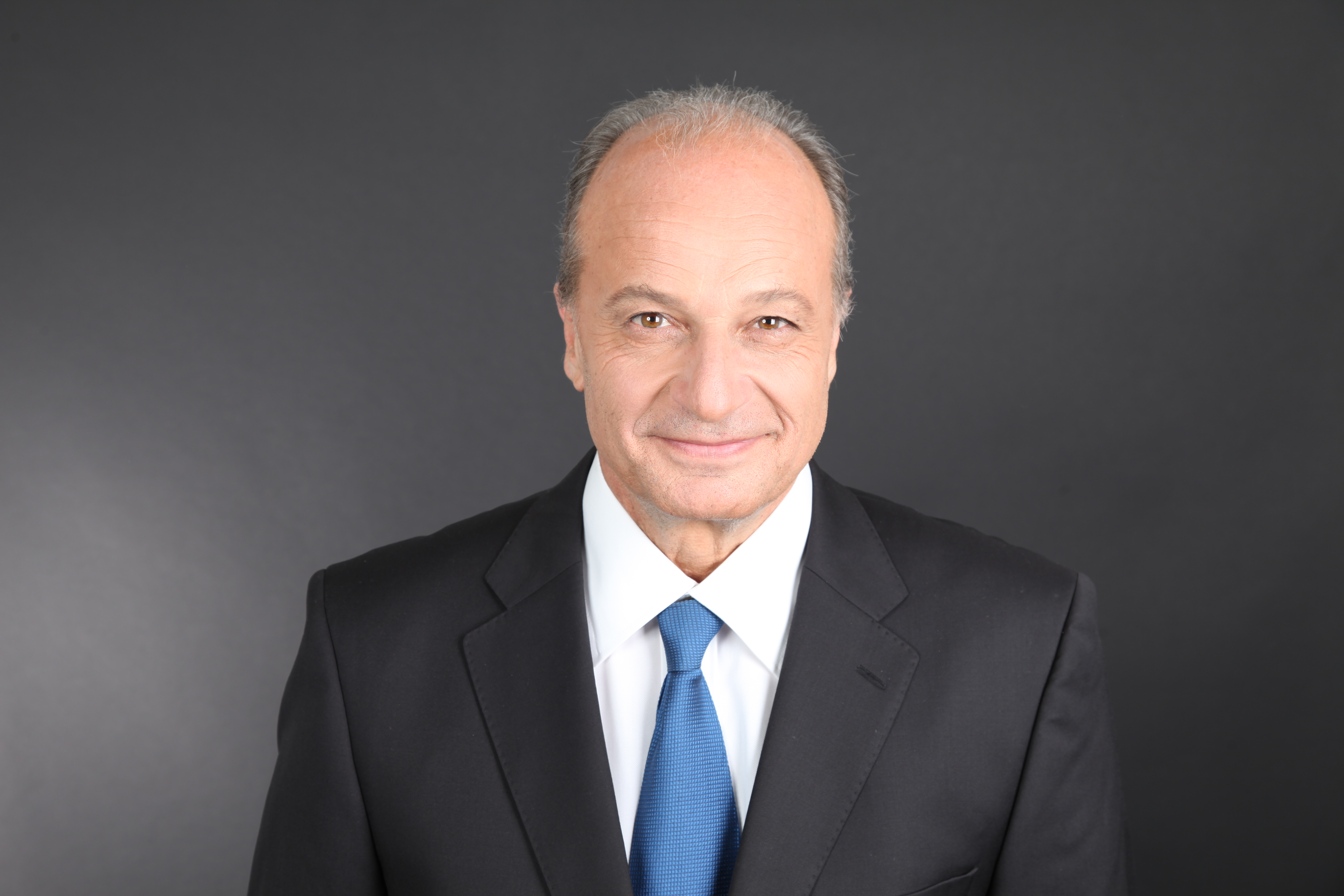
- Official portrait, 2013

Member of the City Council of Zürich
- Incumbent
- Assumed office 2021

Member of the National Council (Switzerland)
- In office 1 December 2003 – 6 May 2014

Personal details
- Born: Filippo Saverio Franz Leutenegger; 25 November 1952 (age 73) Rome, Italy
- Party: The Liberals
- Other political affiliations: Free Democratic Party of Switzerland (until 2009)
- Children: 5
- Occupation: Journalist, economist and politician

Filippo Franz Saverio Leutenegger (born 25 November 1952) is a Swiss journalist, economist and politician. He currently serves as a member of the City Council of Zürich for The Liberals where he serves as the Head of the Department of Education and Schools. He is a former member of the National Council (Switzerland) from 2003 to 2014. He is the former Editor-in-chief of Swiss Radio and Television (SRF).
