= Toni Bortoluzzi =

Swiss politician

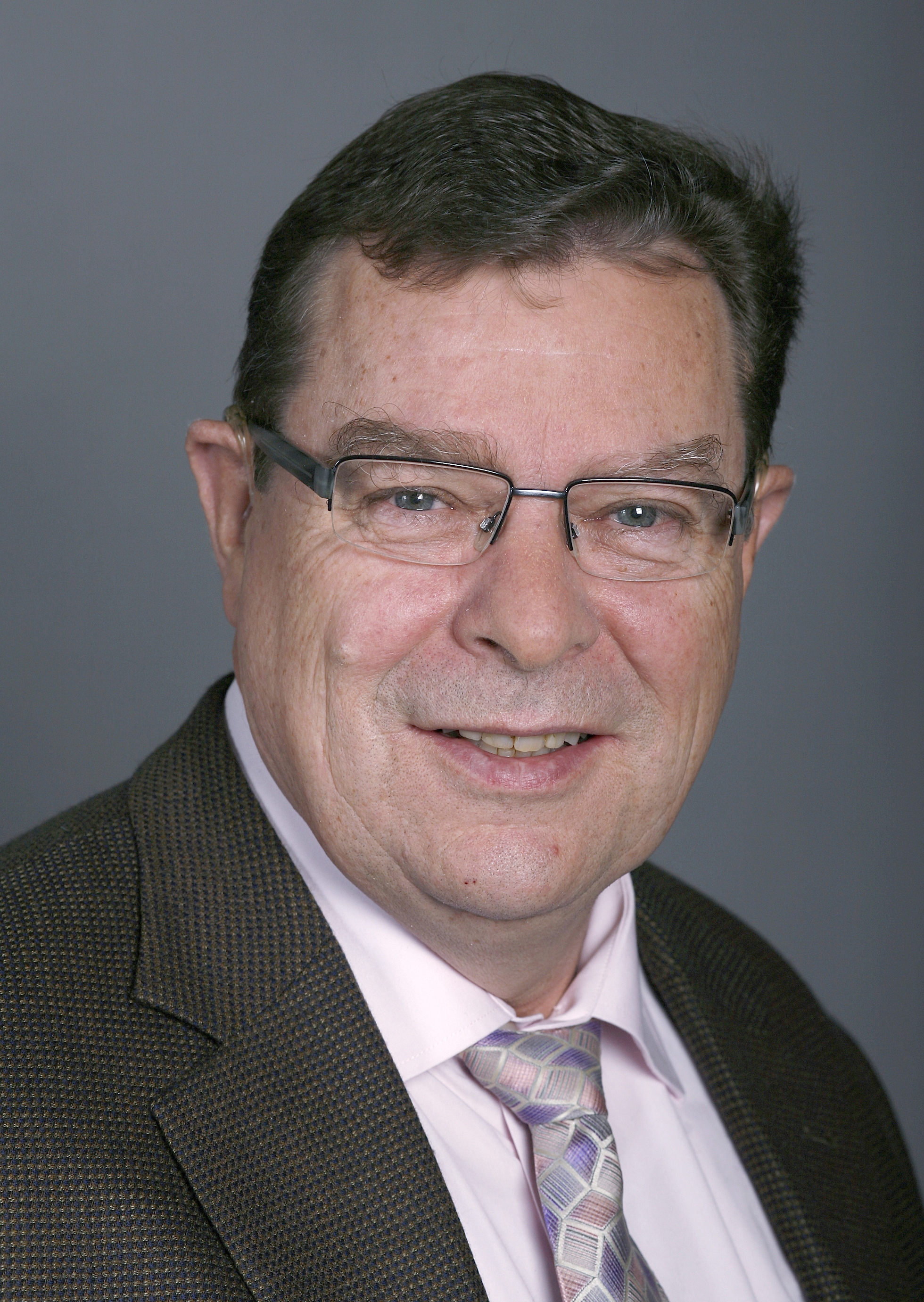
- Official portrait, 2007

Member of the National Council (Switzerland)
- In office 25 November 1991 – 29 November 2015
- Constituency: Canton of Zürich

Member of the Cantonal Council of Zürich
- In office 1984–1991

Personal details
- Born: Anton Bortoluzzi; 16 February 1947 (age 79) Affoltern am Albis, Switzerland
- Party: Swiss People's Party
- Spouse: Katharina Elmer (m. 1976)
- Children: 4
- Occupation: Carpenter, politician
- Website: Official website (inactive); Parliament website

Anton Bortoluzzi colloquially Toni Bortoluzzi (German pronunciation: [ˈtoːni bɔʁtoˈluːtsi]; born 16 February 1947) is a Swiss carpenter and former politician who served on the National Council (Switzerland) for the Swiss People's Party from 1991 to 2015 and previously on the Cantonal Council of Zürich from 1984 to 1991.

A prominent figure in Swiss right-wing politics, was often known as the stalking horse for the right. Bortoluzzi made headlines for his conservative views on homosexuals, lesbians and polyamory calling them misguided and contrary to nature. He was one of the close associates of Christoph Blocher. His son, Flavio Bortoluzzi (born 1977), is a member of the Grand Council of Fribourg since 2021, and candidate for National Council (Switzerland) during the 2023 Swiss federal election.

== Early life and education ==
Bortoluzzi was born 16 February 1947 in Affoltern am Albis, Switzerland. His paternal family originally hails from Farra d'Alpago in the Veneto region of Italy. In 1889, his grandfather, only aged 10, relocated to Switzerland with his family. They ultimately became Swiss citizens in Affoltern am Albis in 1927.

He completed an apprenticeship and became a skilled carpenter and ultimately took-over the carpentry business which his father started. He did not pursue any academic education and later spoke out against academics in government and their loss of reality. Although he was often referred to as Master craftsman, he never held such accreditation.

== Political career ==
Bortoluzzi served on the Affoltern am Albis municipal council from 1982 to 1998, and as the municipal president from 1986. He was a member of the Cantonal Council of Zürich from 1984 to 1991. In 1991, he was elected to the National Council (Switzerland), where he remained until his retirement in 2015. In the 2002 Federal Council (Switzerland) election, he unsuccessfully ran as the Swiss People's Party surprise candidate to succeed Ruth Dreifuss. He also ran unsuccessfully in early 2005 in the by-election for the Executive Council of Zurich. After receiving insufficient support from the Liberals and trailing significantly behind his competitor Hans Hollenstein (Swiss Christian People's Party) in the first round, he withdrew his candidacy.

== Personal life ==
In 1976, Bortoluzzi married Katharina Elmer, originally from Elm, Switzerland. They have four children.
