= Bruno Zuppiger =

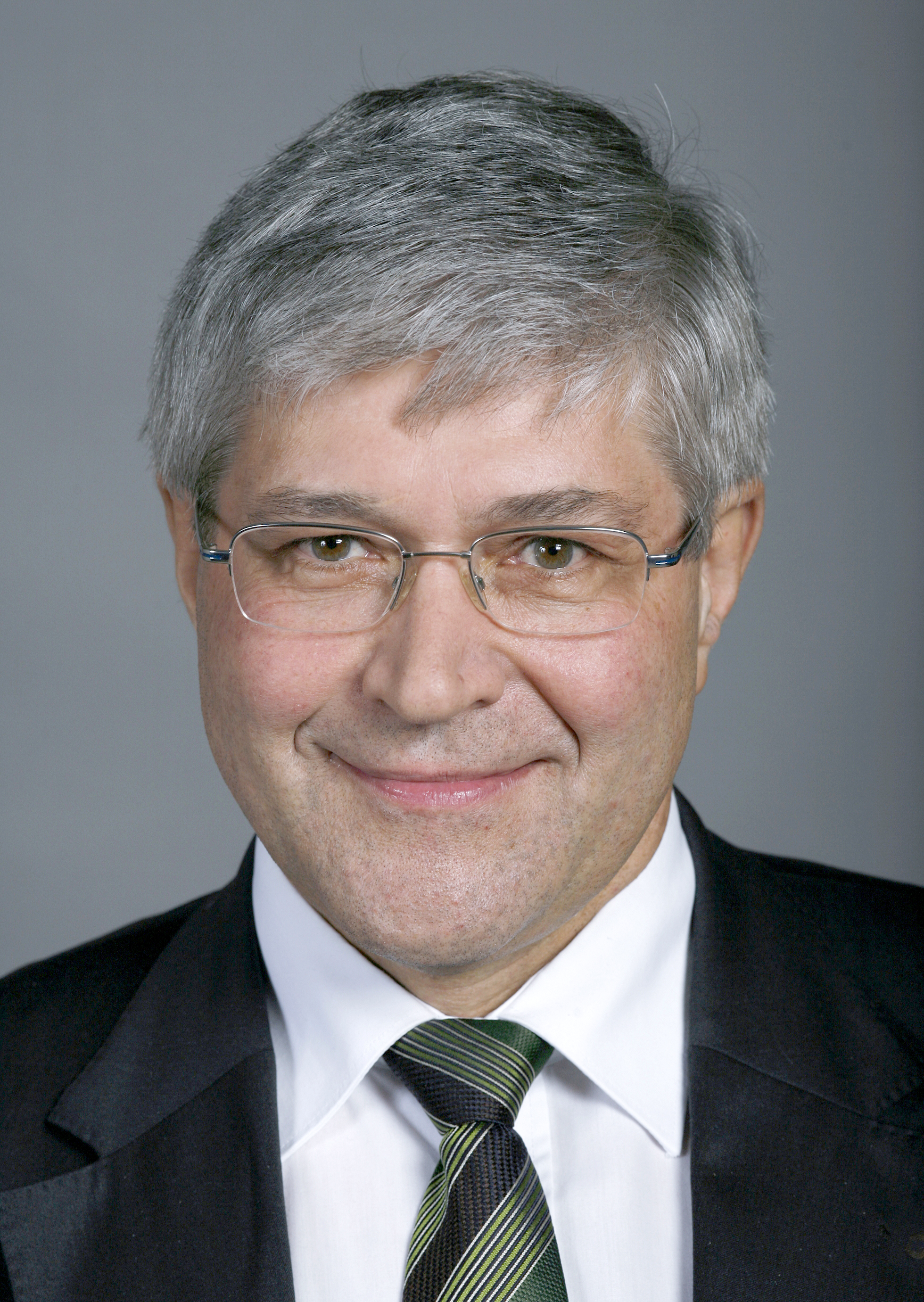
Bruno Zuppiger

Bruno Zuppiger (24 February 1952 – 19 February 2016) was a Swiss management consultant and politician. A member of the conservative Swiss People's Party, he served on the Swiss National Council representing the Canton of Zürich.

Born in St. Gallen, Zuppiger graduated from the University of St. Gallen and the Zürich Teachers' Seminary in 1976. After working as a schoolteacher, he served as secretary and then director of the Trade Association of the Canton of Zürich from 1982 to 1995. Since then, he operated an independent consultancy firm and served on the board of several corporations.

Zuppiger was married to Rösli Zuppiger-Stocker, with whom he had five children, and lived in Hinwil. In 2001, he retired with the grade of colonel from militia service in the Swiss Army, where he commanded an aid and rescue regiment (Rttg Rgt 91) since 1997.

He represented the Swiss People's Party in the Hinwil municipal government from 1982 to 1990. From 1988 to 1994 he headed the local party section. He has served on the board of the cantonal party section since 1993. From 1991 to 1999 he represented the People's Party in the cantonal parliament of Zürich. In 1999, he was elected to the National Council. He was chairman of the National Council's Finance Committee and also served on the Security Policy Committee.

In 2011, his party nominated him for a seat on the Federal Council, but his candidacy collapsed after he was indicted and eventually convicted of fraud. Zuppiger resigned from the National Council in 2012 and died in 2016 of heart failure.

== See also ==
- Swiss Union of Arts and Crafts
