= List of members of the National Council of Switzerland, 2007–2011 =

This is a list of the 200 members of the Swiss National Council for the 2007–2011 legislative term.

The elections were held on October 21, 2007 and the first session of Parliament will open on December 3, 2007. Some changes occurred as a result of the second round of Council of States elections.

== Presidency ==
Office \ Term	2007/2008	2008/2009	2009/2010	2010/2011
President	André Bugnon	Chiara Simoneschi	Pascale Bruderer	Jean-René Germanier
First Vice-President	Chiara Simoneschi	Pascale Bruderer	Jean-René Germanier	Hansjörg Walter
Second Vice-President	Pascale Bruderer	Jean-René Germanier	Hansjörg Walter	Maya Graf

Elections for 2010/2011 are held in December 2010. Traditionally the previous term's first vice-president is elected president.

== The members as of 2008 ==
This list is current as of December 6, 2008.

Name	Party	Canton	URL	Note
Fabio Abate	FDP.The Liberals	Ticino		Elected for FDP
Andreas Aebi	Swiss People's Party	Bern		Newly elected.
Ruedi Aeschbacher	Evangelical People's Party	Zürich		
Evi Allemann	Social Democratic Party	Bern		
Kathrin Amacker	Christian Democratic People's Party	Basel-Landschaft		Newly elected.
Viola Amherd	Christian Democratic People's Party	Valais		
Adrian Amstutz	Swiss People's Party	Bern		
Josiane Aubert	Social Democratic Party	Vaud		
Caspar Baader	Swiss People's Party	Basel-Landschaft		
Elvira Bader	Christian Democratic People's Party	Solothurn		
Marlies Bänziger	Green Party	Zürich		Newly elected.
Dominique Baettig	Swiss People's Party	Jura		Newly elected.
Martin Bäumle	Green Liberal Party	Zürich		
Luc Barthassat	Christian Democratic People's Party	Geneva		
Alexander Baumann	Swiss People's Party	Thurgau		
Didier Berberat	Social Democratic Party	Neuchâtel		
Elmar Bigger	Swiss People's Party	St. Gallen		
Attilio Bignasca	Ticino League	Ticino		
Max Binder	Swiss People's Party	Zürich		
Pirmin Bischof	Christian Democratic People's Party	Solothurn		
Roland Borer	Swiss People's Party	Solothurn		Newly elected.
Toni Bortoluzzi	Swiss People's Party	Zürich		
Jacques Bourgeois	FDP.The Liberals	Fribourg		Newly elected; elected for FDP
Daniel Brélaz	Green Party	Vaud		Newly elected.
Pascale Bruderer	Social Democratic Party	Aargau		
Franz Brun	Christian Democratic People's Party	Lucerne		
Toni Brunner	Swiss People's Party	St. Gallen		
Martine Brunschwig Graf	FDP.The Liberals	Geneva		Elected for Liberal Party
Jakob Büchler	Christian Democratic People's Party	St. Gallen		
André Bugnon	Swiss People's Party	Vaud		
Marina Carobbio Guscetti	Social Democratic Party	Ticino		
Ignazio Cassis	FDP.The Liberals	Ticino		Elected for FDP
Sep Cathomas	Christian Democratic People's Party	Graubünden		
Tarzisius Caviezel	Christian Democratic People's Party	Graubünden		Newly elected.
Maurice Chevrier	Christian Democratic People's Party	Valais		
André Daguet	Social Democratic Party	Bern		
Christophe Darbellay	Christian Democratic People's Party	Valais		
Dominique de Buman	Christian Democratic People's Party	Fribourg		
Walter Donzé	Evangelical People's Party	Bern		
Jean Henri Dunant	Swiss People's Party	Basel-City		
Esther Egger-Wyss	Christian Democratic People's Party	Aargau		Newly elected.
Corina Eichenberger-Walther	FDP.The Liberals	Aargau		Elected for FDP
Eduard Engelberger	FDP.The Liberals	Nidwalden		Elected for FDP
Yvette Estermann	Swiss People's Party	Lucerne		
Hildegard Fässler-Osterwalder	Social Democratic Party	St. Gallen		
Charles Favre	FDP.The Liberals	Vaud		Elected for FDP
Laurent Favre	FDP.The Liberals	Neuchâtel		Newly elected; elected for FDP
Hans Fehr	Swiss People's Party	Zürich		
Hans-Jürg Fehr	Social Democratic Party	Schaffhausen		
Jacqueline Fehr	Social Democratic Party	Zürich		
Mario Fehr	Social Democratic Party	Zürich		
Doris Fiala	FDP.The Liberals	Zürich		Newly elected; elected for FDP
Sylvia Flückiger-Bäni	Swiss People's Party	Aargau		Newly elected.
Peter Föhn	Swiss People's Party	Schwyz		
Kurt Fluri	FDP.The Liberals	Solothurn		Elected for FDP
Olivier Français	FDP.The Liberals	Vaud		Newly elected; elected for FDP
Oskar Freysinger	Swiss People's Party	Valais		
Therese Frösch	Green Party	Bern		
Lieni Füglistaller	Swiss People's Party	Aargau		
Brigitta Gadient	Conservative Democratic Party	Graubünden		Elected for SVP
Chantal Galladé	Social Democratic Party	Zürich		
Jean-René Germanier	FDP.The Liberals	Valais		Elected for FDP
Ulrich Giezendanner	Swiss People's Party	Aargau		
Yvonne Gilli	Green Party	St. Gallen		Newly elected.
Bastien Girod	Green Party	Zürich		Newly elected.
Ida Glanzmann-Hunkeler	Christian Democratic People's Party	Lucerne		
Alice Glauser	Swiss People's Party	Vaud		
Walter Glur	Swiss People's Party	Aargau		
Christine Goll	Social Democratic Party	Zürich		
Jean-Pierre Graber	Swiss People's Party	Bern		Newly elected.
Maya Graf	Green Party	Basel-Landschaft		
Edith Graf-Litscher	Social Democratic Party	Thurgau		
Jean-Pierre Grin-Hoffmann	Swiss People's Party	Vaud		Newly elected.
Andreas Gross	Social Democratic Party	Zürich		
Hans Grunder	Conservative Democratic Party	Bern		Newly elected; elected for SVP
Hans Rudolf Gysin	FDP.The Liberals	Basel-Landschaft		Elected for FDP
Brigitte Häberli-Koller	Christian Democratic People's Party	Thurgau		
Ursula Haller	Conservative Democratic Party	Bern		Elected for SVP
Andrea Hämmerle	Social Democratic Party	Graubünden		
Hansjörg Hassler	Conservative Democratic Party	Graubünden		Elected for SVP
Alfred Heer	Swiss People's Party	Zürich		Newly elected.
Bea Heim	Social Democratic Party	Solothurn		
Hugues Hiltpold	FDP.The Liberals	Geneva		Newly elected; elected for FDP
Norbert Hochreutener	Christian Democratic People's Party	Bern		
Antonio Hodgers	Green Party	Geneva		Newly elected.
Urs Hofmann	Social Democratic Party	Aargau		
Gabi Huber	FDP.The Liberals	Uri		Elected for FDP
Ruth Humbel Näf	Christian Democratic People's Party	Aargau		
Thomas Hurter	Swiss People's Party	Schaffhausen		Newly elected.
Jasmin Hutter	Swiss People's Party	St. Gallen		
Markus Hutter	FDP.The Liberals	Zürich		Elected for FDP
Otto Ineichen	FDP.The Liberals	Lucerne		Elected for FDP
Rudolf Joder	Swiss People's Party	Bern		
Francine John-Calame	Green Party	Neuchâtel		
Daniel Jositsch	Social Democratic Party	Zürich		Newly elected.
Hans Kaufmann	Swiss People's Party	Zürich		
Margret Kiener Nellen	Social Democratic Party	Bern		
Hans Killer	Swiss People's Party	Aargau		Newly elected.
Marianne Kleiner	FDP.The Liberals	Appenzell AR		Elected for FDP
Pierre Kohler	Christian Democratic People's Party	Jura		
Josef Kunz	Swiss People's Party	Lucerne		
Anita Lachenmeier-Thüring	Green Party	Basel-City		Newly elected.
Martin Landolt	Conservative Democratic Party	Glarus		Replaced Werner Marti on March 2, 2009
Josef Lang	Green Party	Zug		
Ueli Leuenberger	Green Party	Geneva		
Filippo Leutenegger	FDP.The Liberals	Zürich		Elected for FDP
Susanne Leutenegger Oberholzer	Social Democratic Party	Basel-Landschaft		
Christian Levrat	Social Democratic Party	Fribourg		
Arthur Loepfe	Christian Democratic People's Party	Appenzell IR		
Ricardo Lumengo	Social Liberal Movement	Bern		Newly elected. Elected for SP.
Christian Lüscher	FDP.The Liberals	Geneva		Newly elected; elected for Liberal Party
Ruedi Lustenberger	Christian Democratic People's Party	Lucerne		
Ada Marra	Social Democratic Party	Vaud		Newly elected.
Christa Markwalder Bär	FDP.The Liberals	Bern		Elected for FDP
Ueli Maurer	Swiss People's Party	Zürich		
Lucrezia Meier-Schatz	Christian Democratic People's Party	St. Gallen		
Werner Messmer	FDP.The Liberals	Thurgau		Elected for FDP
Thérèse Meyer	Christian Democratic People's Party	Fribourg		
Christian Miesch	Swiss People's Party	Basel-Landschaft		
Christoph Mörgeli	Swiss People's Party	Zürich		
Tiana Angelina Moser	Green Liberal Party	Zürich		Newly elected.
Geri Müller	Green Party	Aargau		
Philipp Müller	FDP.The Liberals	Aargau		Elected for FDP
Thomas Müller	Swiss People's Party	Vaud		Elected for CVP
Walter Müller	FDP.The Liberals	St. Gallen		Elected for FDP
Felix Müri	Swiss People's Party	Lucerne		
Jacques Neirynck	Christian Democratic People's Party	Vaud		Newly elected.
Roger Nordmann	Social Democratic Party	Vaud		
Ruedi Noser	FDP.The Liberals	Zürich		Elected for FDP
Eric Nussbaumer	Social Democratic Party	Basel-Landschaft		Newly elected.
Guy Parmelin	Swiss People's Party	Vaud		
Fabio Pedrina	Social Democratic Party	Ticino		
Fulvio Pelli	FDP.The Liberals	Ticino		Elected for FDP
Yvan Perrin	Swiss People's Party	Neuchâtel		
Sylvie Perrinjaquet	FDP.The Liberals	Neuchâtel		Newly elected; elected for Liberal Party
Gerhard Pfister	Christian Democratic People's Party	Zug		
Theophil Pfister	Swiss People's Party	St. Gallen		
Katharina Prelicz-Huber	Green Party	Zürich		From September 15, 2008; succeeded to Ruth Genner
Paul Rechsteiner	Social Democratic Party	St. Gallen		Presides the opening of the first session on December 3, 2007 as longest-serving member (since 1986).
Rudolf Rechsteiner	Social Democratic Party	Basel-City		
Lukas Reimann	Swiss People's Party	St. Gallen		Newly elected. Youngest member (born 1982)
Jean-Claude Rennwald	Social Democratic Party	Jura		
André Reymond	Swiss People's Party	Geneva		
Natalie Rickli	Swiss People's Party	Zürich		Newly elected.
Kathy Riklin	Christian Democratic People's Party	Zürich		
Jean-François Rime	Swiss People's Party	Fribourg		
Meinrado Robbiani	Christian Democratic People's Party	Ticino		
Stéphane Rossini	Social Democratic Party	Valais		
Maria Roth-Bernasconi	Social Democratic Party	Geneva		
Claude Ruey	FDP.The Liberals	Vaud		Elected for Liberal Party
Hans Rutschmann	Swiss People's Party	Zürich		
Louis Schelbert	Green Party	Lucerne		
Simon Schenk	Swiss People's Party	Bern		
Silvia Schenker	Social Democratic Party	Basel-City		
Marcel Scherer	Swiss People's Party	Zug		
Ernst Schibli	Swiss People's Party	Zürich		
Barbara Schmid-Federer	Christian Democratic People's Party	Zürich		Newly elected.
Roberto Schmidt	Christian Democratic People's Party	Valais		Newly elected.
Johann N. Schneider	FDP.The Liberals	Bern		Elected for FDP
Pirmin Schwander	Swiss People's Party	Schwyz		
Pius Segmüller	Christian Democratic People's Party	Lucerne		Newly elected.
Chiara Simoneschi-Cortesi	Christian Democratic People's Party	Ticino		
Christian van Singer	Green Party	Vaud		Newly elected.
Carlo Sommaruga	Social Democratic Party	Geneva		
Peter Spuhler	Swiss People's Party	Thurgau		
Jürg Stahl	Swiss People's Party	Zürich		
Luzi Stamm	Swiss People's Party	Aargau		
Jean-François Steiert	Social Democratic Party	Fribourg		
Hans Stöckli	Social Democratic Party	Bern		
Doris Stump	Social Democratic Party	Aargau		
Franziska Teuscher	Green Party	Bern		
Anita Thanei	Social Democratic Party	Zürich		
Georges Theiler	FDP.The Liberals	Lucerne		Elected for FDP
Adèle Thorens	Green Party	Vaud		Newly elected.
Pierre Triponez	FDP.The Liberals	Bern		Elected for FDP
Andy Tschümperlin	Social Democratic Party	Schwyz		
Pierre-François Veillon	Swiss People's Party	Vaud		
Daniel Vischer	Green Party	Zürich		
Alec von Graffenried	Green Party	Bern		Newly elected.
Christoph von Rotz	Swiss People's Party	Obwalden		Newly elected.
Erich von Siebenthal	Swiss People's Party	Bern		Newly elected.
Eric Voruz	Social Democratic Party	Vaud		Newly elected.
Christian Waber	Federal Democratic Union	Bern		
Hansjörg Walter	Swiss People's Party	Thurgau		
Hansruedi Wandfluh	Swiss People's Party	Bern		
Christian Wasserfallen	FDP.The Liberals	Bern		Newly elected; elected for FDP
Marie-Thérèse Weber-Gobet	Christian Social Party	Fribourg		From December 1, 2008; succeeded to Hugo Fasel
Reto Wehrli	Christian Democratic People's Party	Schwyz		
Thomas Weibel	Green Liberal Party	Zürich		Newly elected.
Hans Widmer (politician)	Social Democratic Party	Lucerne		
Walter Wobmann	Swiss People's Party	Solothurn		
Brigit Wyss	Green Party	Solothurn		Newly elected.
Ursula Wyss	Social Democratic Party	Bern		
Markus Zemp	Christian Democratic People's Party	Aargau		
Josef Zisyadis	Alternative Left	Vaud		Elected for PdA. Replaced Marianne Huguenin who resigned before the first session.
Bruno Zuppiger	Swiss People's Party	Zürich		

== Retired or deceased members ==
Name	Party	Canton	Note
Marianne Huguenin	Swiss Party of Labour	Vaud	Resigned on November 1, 2007, prior to first session; succeeded by Josef Zisyadis.
Ruth Genner	Green Party	Zürich	Resigned September 14, 2008; succeeded by Katharina Prelicz-Huber
Hugo Fasel	Christian Social Party	Fribourg	Resigned November 30, 2008, succeeded by Marie-Thérèse Weber-Gobet
Werner Marti	Social Democratic Party	Glarus	

== See also ==
- List of members of the Swiss National Council (2003-2007)
- Political parties of Switzerland for the abbreviations
- List of members of the Swiss Council of States

== Notes and references ==
- The data are from the website of the Swiss Federal Assembly.
