= Balthasar Glättli =

Swiss politician (born 1972)

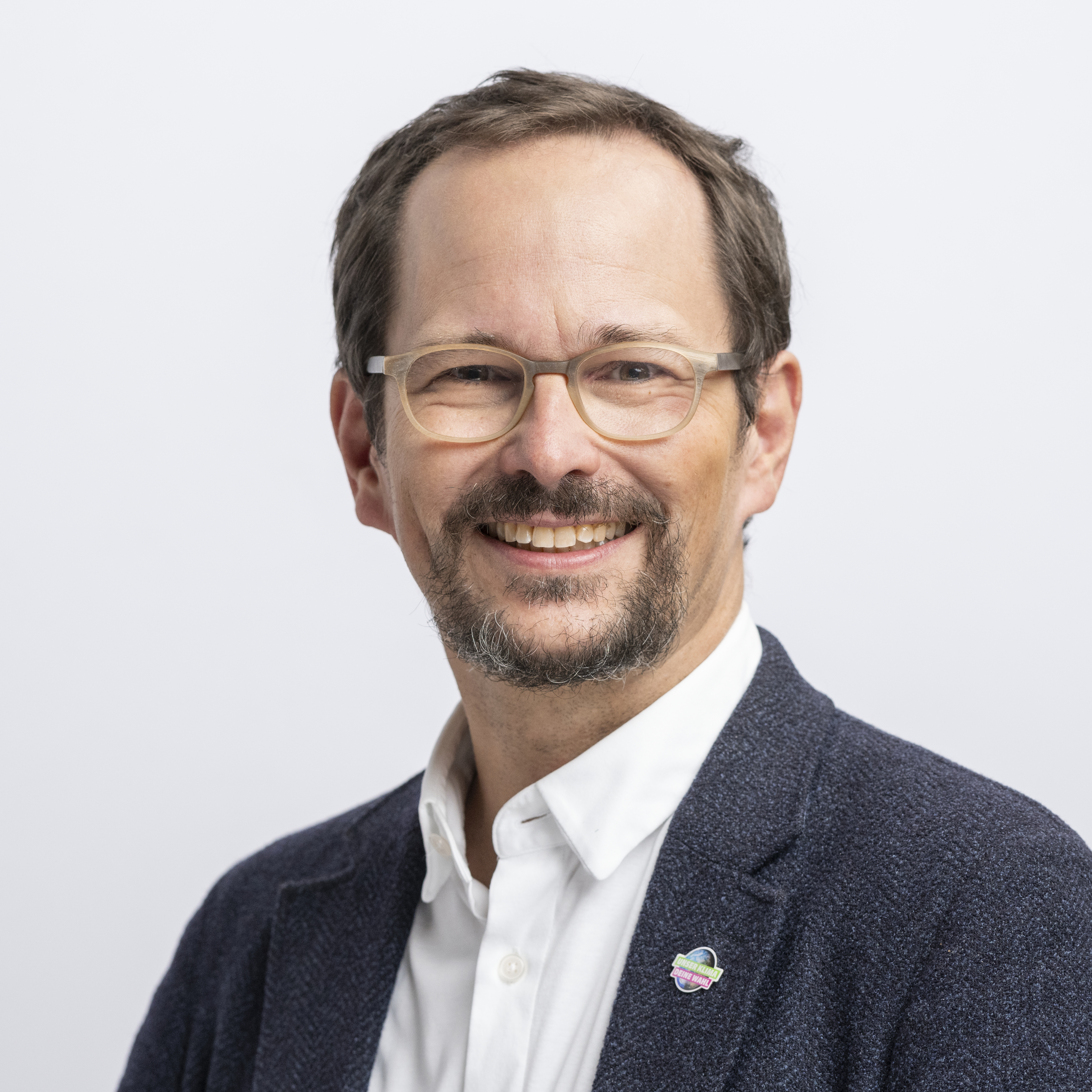
- Official portrait, 2023

Member of the National Council
- In office 5 December 2011 – 26 April 2026

President of the Green Party of Switzerland
- In office 20 June 2020 – 7 April 2024
- Preceded by: Regula Rytz
- Succeeded by: Lisa Mazzone

Personal details
- Born: 12 February 1972 (age 54) Zürich, Switzerland
- Party: Green Party of Switzerland
- Spouse: Min Li Marti
- Children: 1
- Education: University of Zurich (no degree)
- Occupation: Politician
- Profession: Web designer
- Website: balthasar-glaettli.ch (in German)

Balthasar Glättli (born 12 February 1972) is a Swiss politician. He was a member of the National Council and, was the president of the Green Party of Switzerland from June 2020 until April 2024.

== Early life and education ==
Glättli was born 12 February 1972 in Zürich, Switzerland, to Rolf Glättli and Silvia Glättli (née Züblin), both elementary school teachers. His younger brother is cellist Kaspar Singer (né Glättli). He completed his Matura at Kantonsschule Zürcher Oberland and then studied philosophy, linguistics and German at the University of Zürich between 1991 and 1996 and ultimately resumed studies from 2009 to 2014, but did not graduate with a degree.

== Political career ==
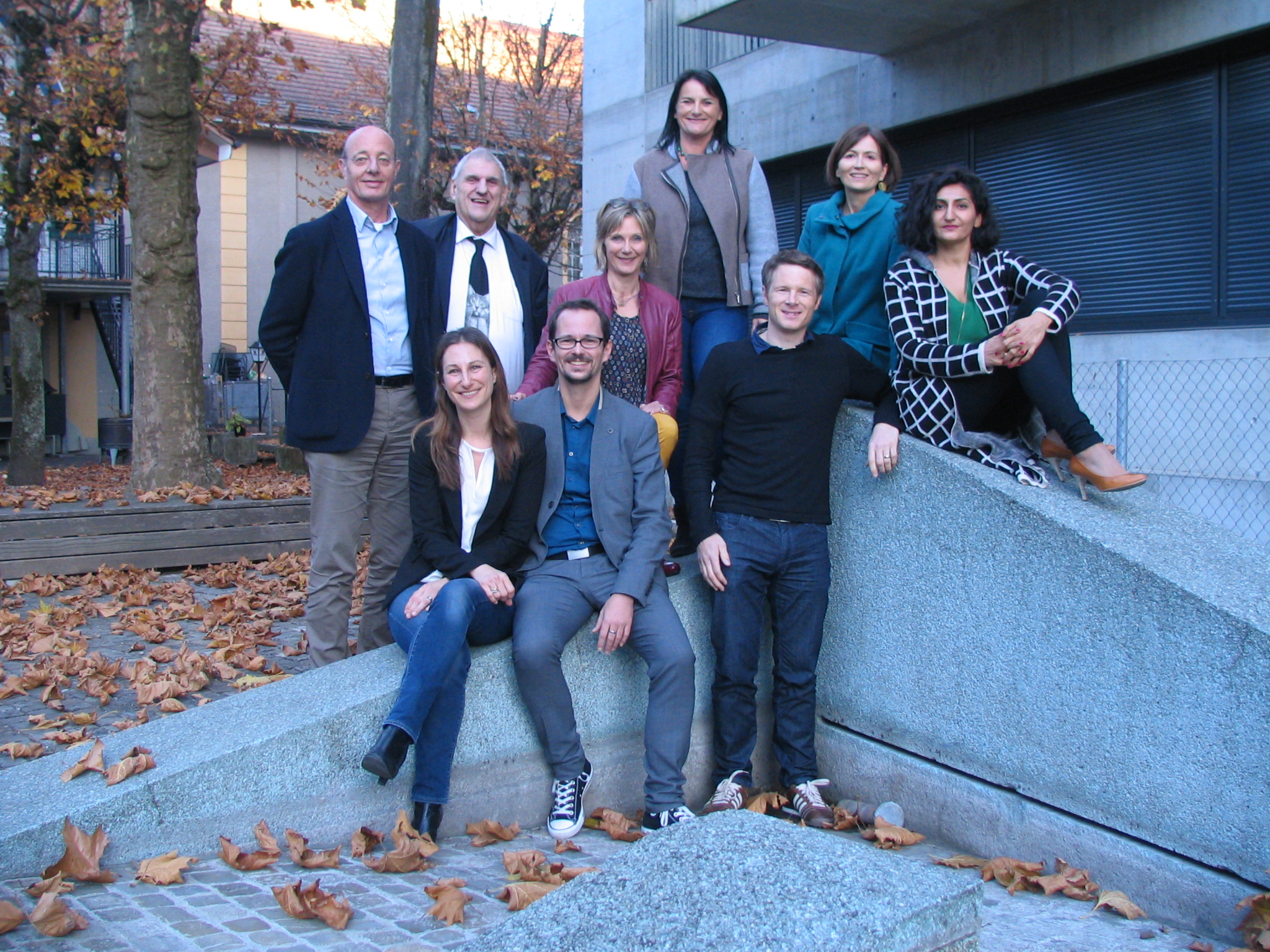
Balthasar Glättli, and among other GPS politicians, Regula Rytz and Sibel Arslan in November 2015

Glättli joined the Green Party of Switzerland in 1991 and was elected as board member of the cantonal section in Zürich. Between 1998 and 2011 he represented Zürich-Seefeld in the parliament of the city of Zürich. He was elected to the National Council in the Swiss federal election in October 2011, and re-elected several times. From December 2013 until June 2020, he was President of the Green parliamentarian Group. From 2004 to 2008 Glättli was co-president of the cantonal GPS party, in co-operation with Marlies Bänziger.

Between June 2020 and April 2024 he was President of the Green Party.

In 2026 Glättli was elected to the Zurich city government and stepped down as member of the National council.

== Mandatory work ==
Between 2010 and 2012 Glättli was in charge of the campaigns of the Swiss Union of Public Service Personnel. He presided the Mieterverband Deutschschweiz, the Swiss German section of the union of tenants from 2014 to 2023, and was vice-president of the Swiss national Mieterverband from 2013 to 2023. He is a member of various NGO's like the Erklärung von Bern, Amnesty International Switzerland and Greenpeace Switzerland.

== Personal life ==
Balthasar Glättli graduated Maturität at the gymnasium in Wetzikon in 1991, and studied philosophy, linguistics and German literature at the University of Zurich. Glättli directs a web design and consulting company, is married to the Swiss politician Min Li Marti. They live with their daughter in Zürich-Wipkingen.
