= Ueli Leuenberger =

Swiss politician

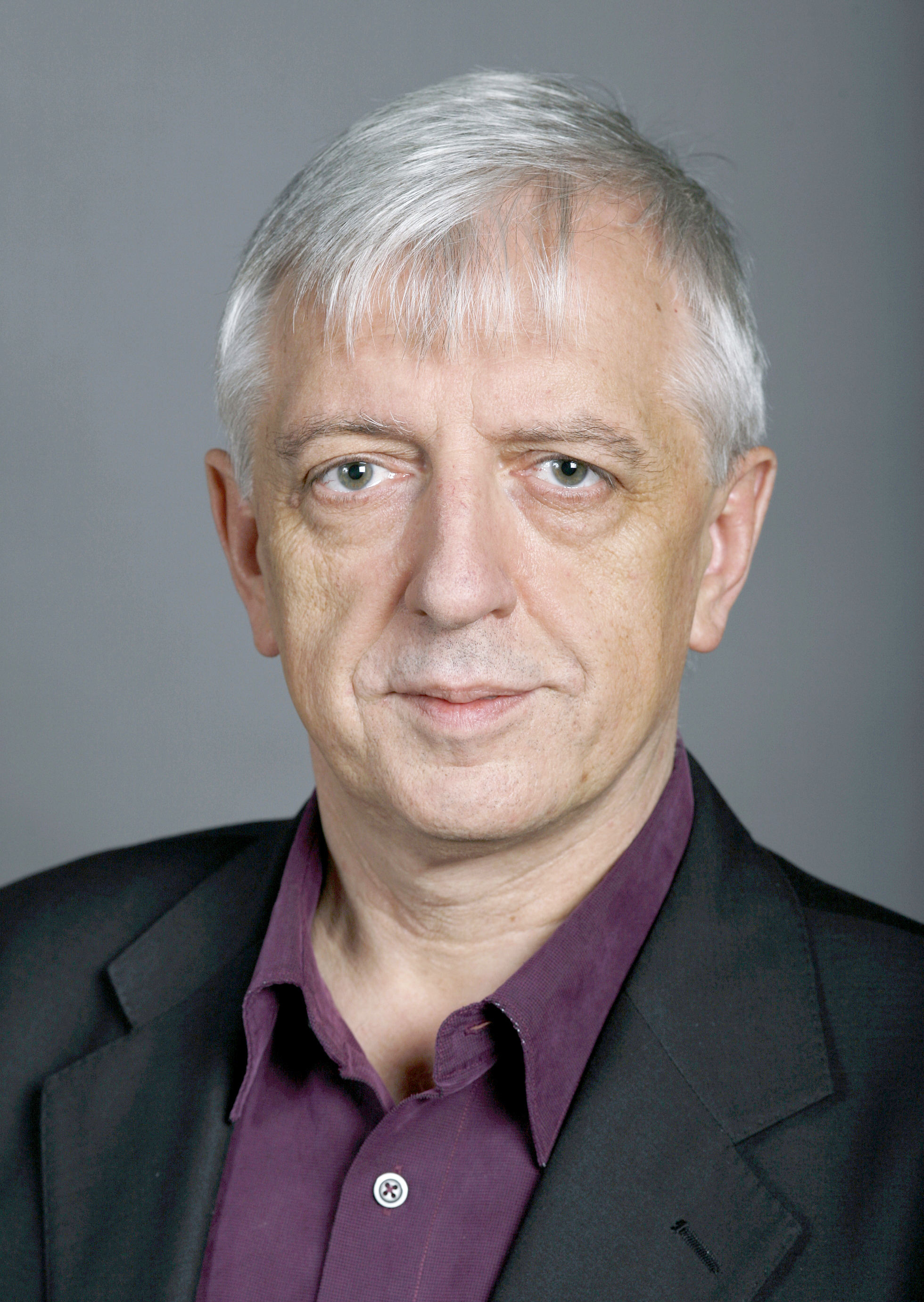
Ueli Leuenberger (2007)

Ueli Leuenberger (born 26 March 1952 in Oberönz; Place of origin in Rohrbachgraben, Bern) is a Swiss politician affiliated with the Green Party.

== Biography ==
Ueli Leuenberger was born to a working-class family. After completing his education he became a chef in Lucerne. In 1972, he moved to Geneva. There he began to study social work at the Institut d'Etudes Sociales de Genève, with a focus on environmental work.

After this study, he took up various roles in the social and union sectors, such as leader of a Caritas refugee centre, responsible member for the hotel and hospitality sector of the SIT union, social worker with the Swiss evangelical church and consultant at the Centre Social Protestant.

In 1996, Leuenberger founded the Université Populaire Albanaise (Albanian Peoples' University) in Geneva, a pilot project for the integration of Kosovar refugees into Swiss life, which he led until 2002. For this work, he received an award for human rights work from Le Courrier in 1996.

Today, he is a vocational teacher in Geneva and lectures irregularly on social integration and people from the Balkans.

== Politics ==
Leuenberger joined the Greens in Geneva in 1988. In 1990 he became the president of the Greens for Geneva City. The Left-Green coalition succeeded in achieving a majority in the municipal council and forming a government. From 1991 until 1997, he was a municipal councillor with the role of chairman of the social affairs committee. From 2001 until 2003, he was a member of the Cantonal parliament of Geneva.

On 1 June 2003, Leuenberger took the place of Patrice Mugny in the Swiss National Council, since the latter had been appointed to the Geneva city executive government. He was re-elected to the National Council on 21 October 2007, following the 2007 Swiss federal election.

In 2004, he was appointed Deputy President of the Green Party of Switzerland and in April 2008 he became president, succeeding Ruth Genner. He continued in this role until 2012, when he was replaced by two co-presidents, Adèle Thorens Goumaz and Regula Rytz.

As a politician, he has focussed on the defense of the rights of migrants, the right of asylum and human rights. He fought against xenophobia and the "Blocherisation" of Switzerland. Supportive of a greater north–south solidarity, he has also promoted labour ecology, protests against the "nuclear lobby", and participatory democracy.

== Awards ==
- 2013: Prix Diaspora for his engagement with Albanian culture and his work or the integration of Albanians in Switzerland.

== Works ==
- With Alain Maillard: Les damnés du troisième cercle. Les Kosovars en Suisse. 1965–1999 (The Damned of the Third Circle: The Kosovars in Switzerland, 1965–1999). Les éditions Metropolis, Genève 1999.
