= Katharina Prelicz-Huber =

Swiss politician (born 1959)

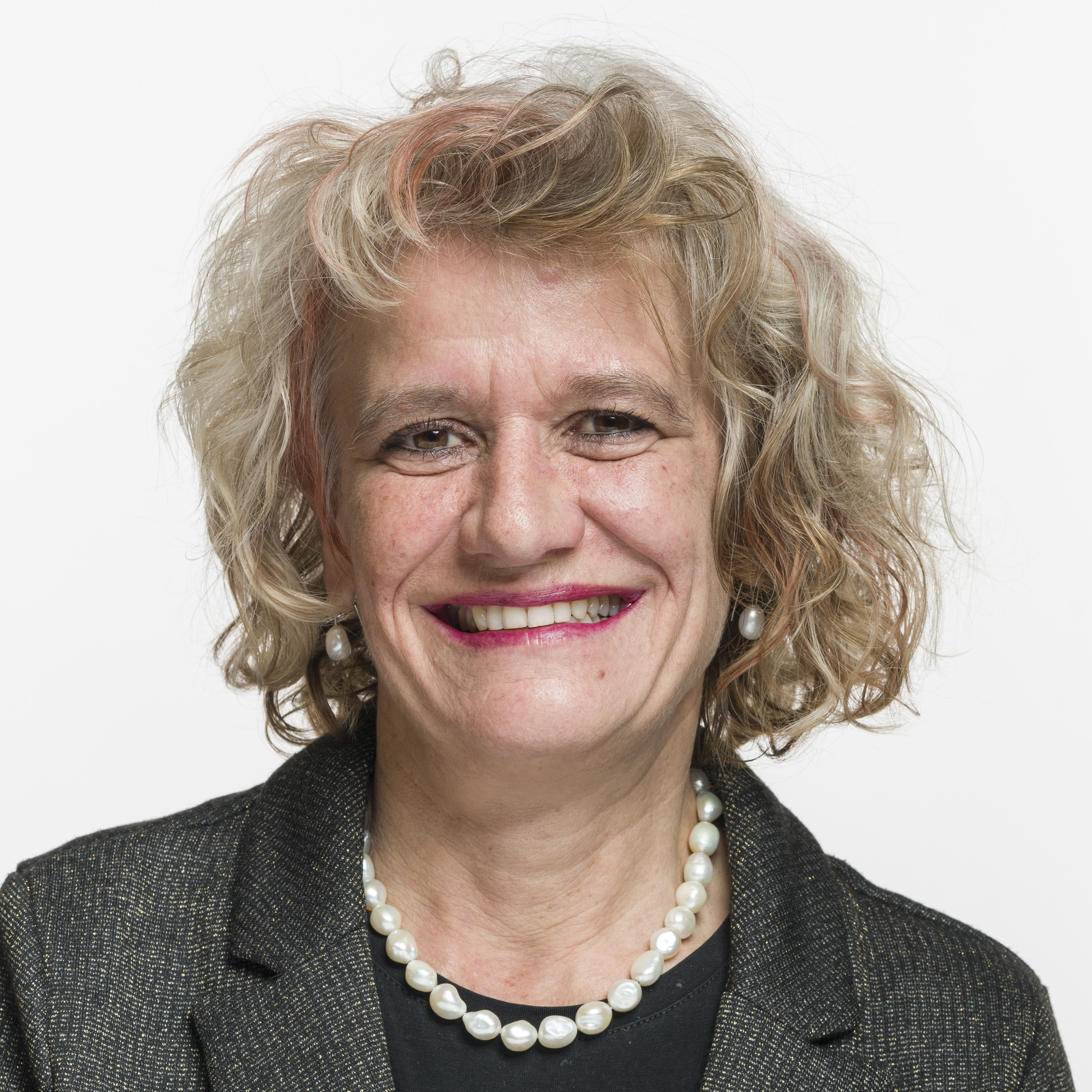

Member of the National Council of Switzerland
- In office 2008–2011
- Incumbent
- Assumed office 2019

President of the VPOD
- Incumbent
- Assumed office 2010

Personal details
- Born: 12 October 1959 (age 66) Bern, Switzerland

Katharina Prelicz-Huber (born 12 October 1959) is a Swiss politician of the Green Party of Switzerland who serves as the president of the Swiss Union of Public Service Personnel (VPOD) and a member of the National Council.

== Political career ==
Prelicz-Huber was active in the politics in Zurich for many years, in the municipal council of Zürich from 1990 to 2003 and again from 2014 to 2019 as well as the cantonal council of Zurich from 2002 to 2008. On 15 September 2008, she succeeded Ruth Genner, who had been elected to the executive council of Zurich, in the National Council. She had a seat in the Grand Chamber until the Swiss parliamentary elections in 2011. In the Federal Elections in October 2019, she was re-elected to the National Council.

=== Political views ===
Prelicz-Huber supports the Swiss political traditions of a direct democracy and federalism. She has also been an active member of the women's rights movement since 1991.

== Professional career ==
Prelicz-Huber is a former professor at the Lucerne University of Applied Sciences and Arts In March 2010 she succeeded Christine Goll as the president of the VPOD.

== Personal life ==
Prelicz-Huber is married, has a son. Her places of origin are Winterthur, Zürich and Meilen.
