= Valentine Python =

Swiss climatologist and politician

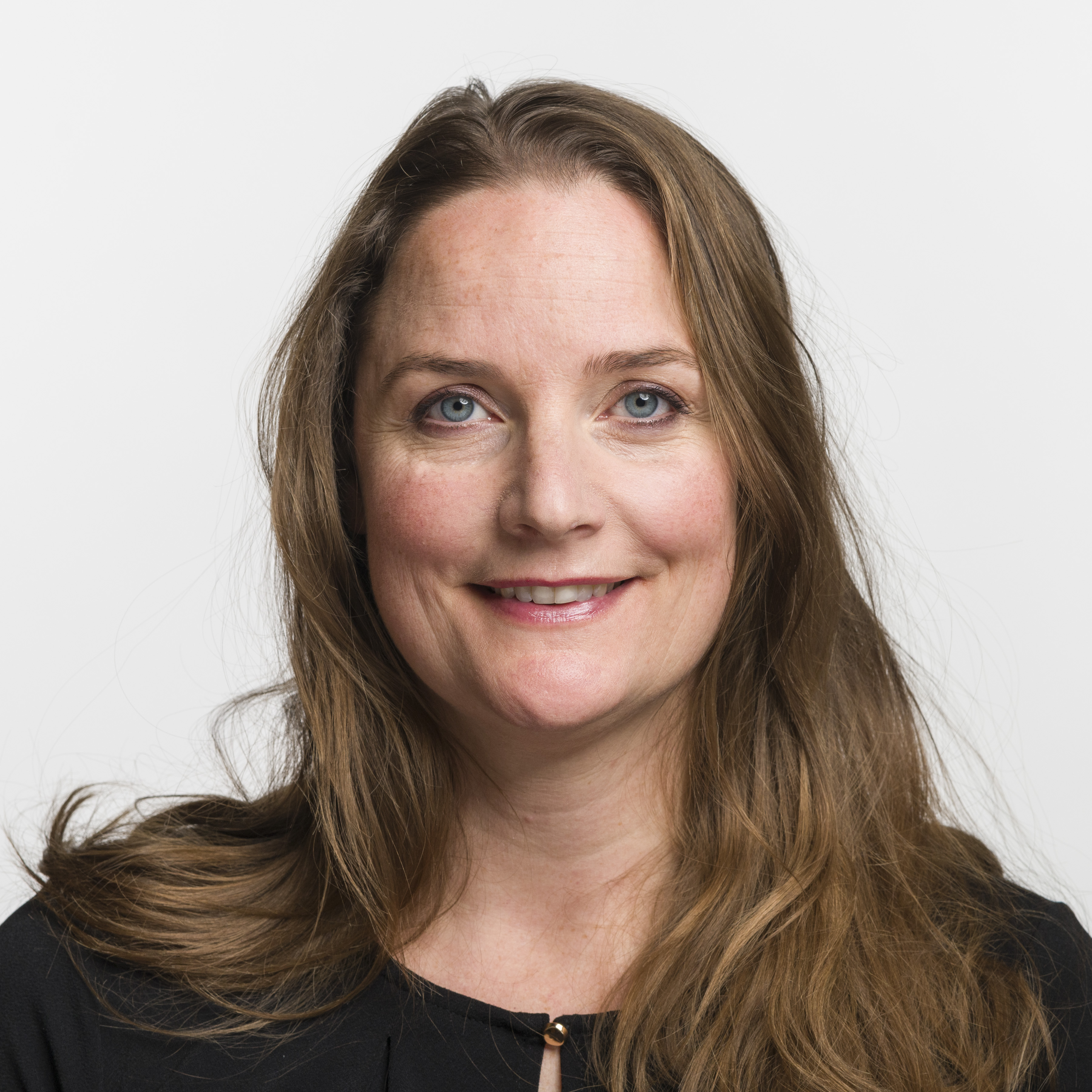
- Valentine Python

Member of the National Council of Switzerland
- Incumbent
- Assumed office December 2019
- Constituency: Canton de Vaud

Personal details
- Born: 18 June 1975 (age 51) Neuchâtel, Switzerland
- Party: Green Party of Switzerland
- Education: École Polytechnique Fédérale de Lausanne
- Occupation: Climatologist

Valentine Python (born 18 June 1975 in Neuchâtel) is a Swiss climatologist and a member in the National Council of Switzerland of the Green Party of Switzerland (GPS).

== Education and early life ==
Valentine Python was born on 18 June 1975 in Neuchâtel. She studied history and geography at the University of Neuchâtel and graduated in 2006 with a master's degree. In 2010 she completed her doctorate at the École Polytechnique Fédérale de Lausanne (EPFL).

== Professional career ==
While still preparing her Doctorate at the EPFL, she studied the report of the Intergovernmental Panel on Climate Change (IPPC) from 2007 onwards and she defends the view that the human being has a responsibility in the global warming effect. In March 2020, she was elected into the advisory council of the FH Switzerland, an organization focused on the higher education in Switzerland together with Élisabeth Baume-Schneider.

She also writes a blog on environmental issues for the newspaper Le Temps.

== Political career ==
Valentine Python only joined the Green Party in 2018 and was directly elected to the municipal council of La Tour-de-Peilz. In the Swiss parliamentary elections in 2019 Python ran for the National Council and became the first candidate to succeed. After Adèle Thorens Goumaz was elected into the Council of States on 10 November 2019, Phyton slipped into the National Council as her successor. She was sworn in as a national councilor on 2 December 2019. In parliament, she took a seat in the science, education and culture as well as the environmental commission.

=== Political positions ===
She introduced a bill on a feasibility study to evaluate an eventual introduction of a tax on financial transfers and she defends the view that the human being has a responsibility in the global warming effect. In 2023, she introduced a bill which demanded from the Federal Council an evaluation on how to prevent the denial of climate change.

== Personal life ==
Her place of origin is Bôle in Neuchâtel.
