= Li Min =

Li Min is the name of:

- Emperor Zhaozong of Tang (867–904), Tang dynasty emperor who briefly used the name Li Min from 888 to 889
- Li Min (daughter of Mao Zedong) (born 1936), daughter of Chinese leader Mao Zedong
- Li Min (synchronised swimmer) (born 1976), Chinese synchronized swimmer
- Min Li Marti (born 1974), Swiss politician, publisher, sociologist and historian
