= Esther Egger-Wyss =

Swiss politician (born 1952)

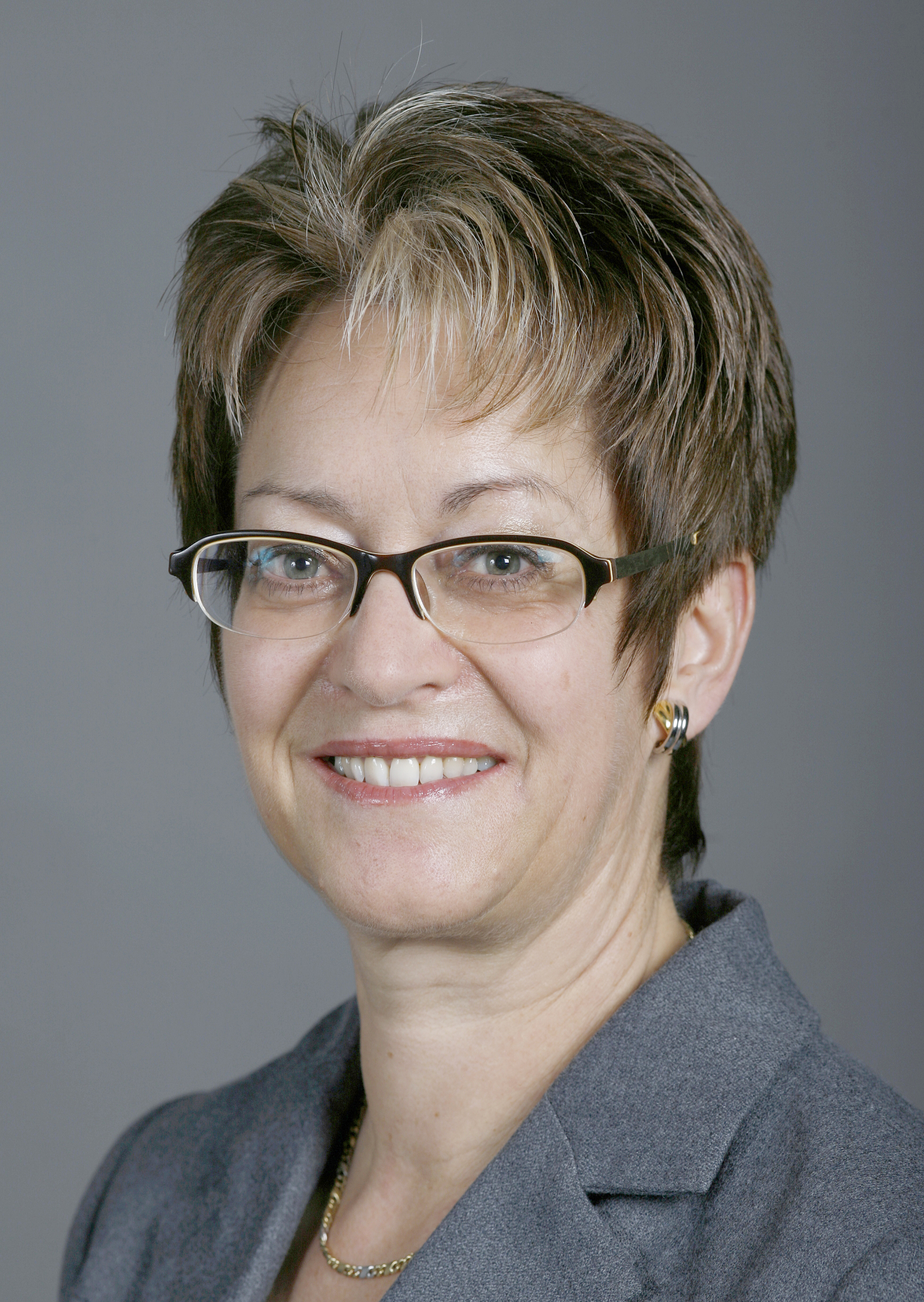

Member of the National Council of Switzerland
- In office 2007–2011

Personal details
- Born: 2 October 1952 (age 73) Menziken, Switzerland
- Party: Christian Democratic People's Party

Esther Egger-Wyss (born 2 October 1952) is a Swiss politician from the Christian Democratic People's Party of Switzerland (CVP). She was a member of the National Council of Switzerland from 2007 to 2011.

== Biography ==
Egger-Wyss was a member of the Grand Council of the Canton of Aargau from 1997 to 2007. She led the CVP parliamentary group for four and a half years and served as president of the council in 2006/2007. From 2001 until the end of 2011, she was vice president of the CVP Aargau.

She was elected to the National Council in 2007. There, she was a member of the Finance Committee, the Political Institutions Committee, the Committee for Pardons and Jurisdictional Conflicts, and the Rehabilitation Committee. In 2011, she failed to win re-election and left the National Council. In 2019, she was president of the Aargau Senior Citizens' Association (ASV).

Egger-Wyss lives in Kirchdorf. She is the mother of three children.

== See also ==
- List of members of the National Council of Switzerland, 2007–2011
