= Min Li Marti =

Swiss politician

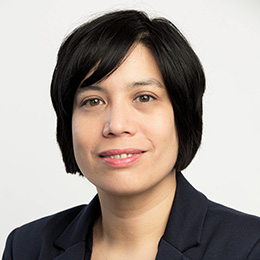
- Official portrait, 2016

Member of the National Council (Switzerland)
- Incumbent
- Assumed office 2015

Personal details
- Born: Min Li Marti; 1 June 1974 (age 52) Bern, Switzerland
- Party: Social Democratic Party of Switzerland
- Spouse: Balthasar Glättli
- Children: 1
- Education: University of Zurich
- Occupation: politician
- Profession: sociologist, journalist, social and economic historian
- Website: minli-marti.ch (in German)

Min Li Marti (born 1 June 1974) is a Swiss sociologist, historian, publisher and politician who currently serves on the National Council (Switzerland) for the Social Democratic Party since 2015.

== Early life and career ==
Marti was born 1 June 1975 in Bern, Switzerland, a daughter of a Swiss father and a Chinese-born refugee mother. She was ultimately raised in Olten, where she attended the local schools. In 1995, she moved to Zürich, where she completed her studies in sociology, journalism, and social and economic history at the University of Zurich in 2000.

== Professional career ==
In 2004, she co-founded the production company "Das Kollektiv für audiovisuelle Werke GmbH". From 2012 to 2015, Marti worked as a Senior Consultant for the Kampagnenforum and a communications agency. As a columnist of the free newspaper 20 Minuten, Marti became known to a wider public. Since the end of 2014, she has been the editor-in-chief of the weekly newspaper P.S. based in Zürich.

== Political career and mandatory work ==
Marti's political career began in the association of students of the University of Zurich (VSUZH). From 2002 to 2015, she represented the districts 4 and 5 for the SP political party in the Zürich city parliament (Gemeinderat). Working for the Zürich Film Foundation, she advised SP politicians, and from 2000 to 2004, she was party secretary of the SP of the Canton of Zurich, where she was responsible for the cantonal election campaign. From 2008 to 2010, she led the campaigns as central secretary at the Swiss Union of Public Service Personnel, and in 2011, together with Andrea Sprecher, organized the SP's national election campaign. From 2009 to 2015, she chaired the SP Group and the Intergroup Commission (IFC). Min Li Marti is a member of the local SP board of directors. At the 2015 Swiss National Council elections, she was elected for the SP, where she is a member of the Commission for Science, Education and Culture (WBK).

== Personal life ==
Marti is married to the Swiss politician Balthasar Glättli and lives in Zürich-Wipkingen. According to the two politicians, her daughter, born on 24 January 2018, is the first baby whose parents are members of the National Council at the same time. Until the spring session at the end of February 2018, Marti and Glättli took parental leave; Marti continued her maternity leave by end of spring 2018.

== Film production ==
Marti also produced three movies, among them two short films and the 2010 documentary Guru: Bhagwan, His Secretary & His Bodyguard as associate producer. She is member of the Das Kollektiv, a film production company based in Zürich.
