= Yves Christen =

Swiss politician

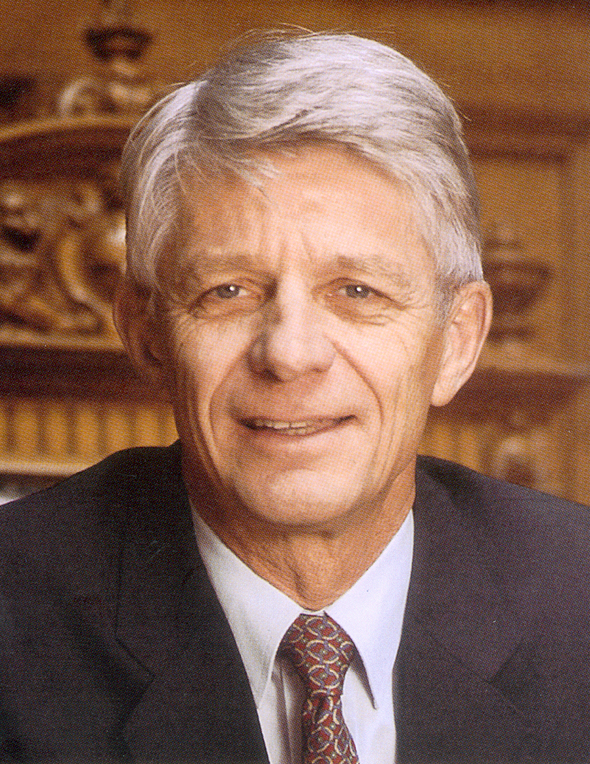

Personal details
- Born: 13 July 1941 (age 84) Bern, Switzerland
- Political party: FDP.The Liberals

Yves Christen (born 13 July 1941 in Bern, Switzerland) is a Swiss politician who served as President of the National Council from 6 November 2002 to 1 November 2003.

Christen studied at ETH Zurich and obtained a diploma in civil engineering. He was first elected to the National Council in 1995, serving until 2006.

Christen is married and has two children. A judo practitioner, he was the champion in the under 63 kg category at the 1968 Swiss Championship in Fribourg.

Preceded by Liliane Maury Pasquier	President of the National Council; 2002–2003	Succeeded by Max Binder
