= People's Movement for the Environment =

People's Movement for the Environment Mouvement populaire pour l'environnement
- Abbreviation: MPE
- Founded: 1971
- Succeeded by: Écologie et Liberté
- Headquarters: Neuchâtel
- Ideology: Environmentalism

The People's Movement for the Environment (French: Mouvement populaire pour l'environnement) was the first Swiss environmentalist party. It was founded in Switzerland in December 1971 in order to oppose a freeway planned to pass through the town of Neuchâtel.

== History ==
In 1972, the party stood for elections for the town legislature. The election was a major success: the MPE received 17.8% of the votes, and 8 out of 41 seats.

The MPE already dealt, in the 1970s, with subjects which became those of the Green Party of Switzerland: land development, particularly urban land development; resisting large road projects; and the protection of the natural environment.

In the 1976 elections, the MPE again obtained good results, with 7 out of 41 seats on the General Council of Neuchâtel. It also got a seat on the Municipal (Executive) Council with the election of Jacques Knoepfler, who managed the finances of the town between 1976 and 1980. During this term, the MPE became more environmentalist. Among its members in this era was the militant anti-nuclear professor Jean Rossel. The problems between the founding members, the members and the environmentalists begun in this era.

In 1980, the MPE registered a clear decline in electoral strength during the elections to the General Council. It dropped to 5 seats. During this term, the MPE positioned itself more strongly to the left, often supporting the actions of the Swiss Social Democratic Party.

On 24 January 1984, the MPE became Ecologie et Liberté when the cantonal party was founded.

== See also ==
- Environmental movement in Switzerland

== Bibliography ==
- Historique des Verts du canton de neuchâtel (PDF)
