= Marlies Bänziger =

Swiss politician (born 1960)

Alt Nationalrätin Marlies Bänziger
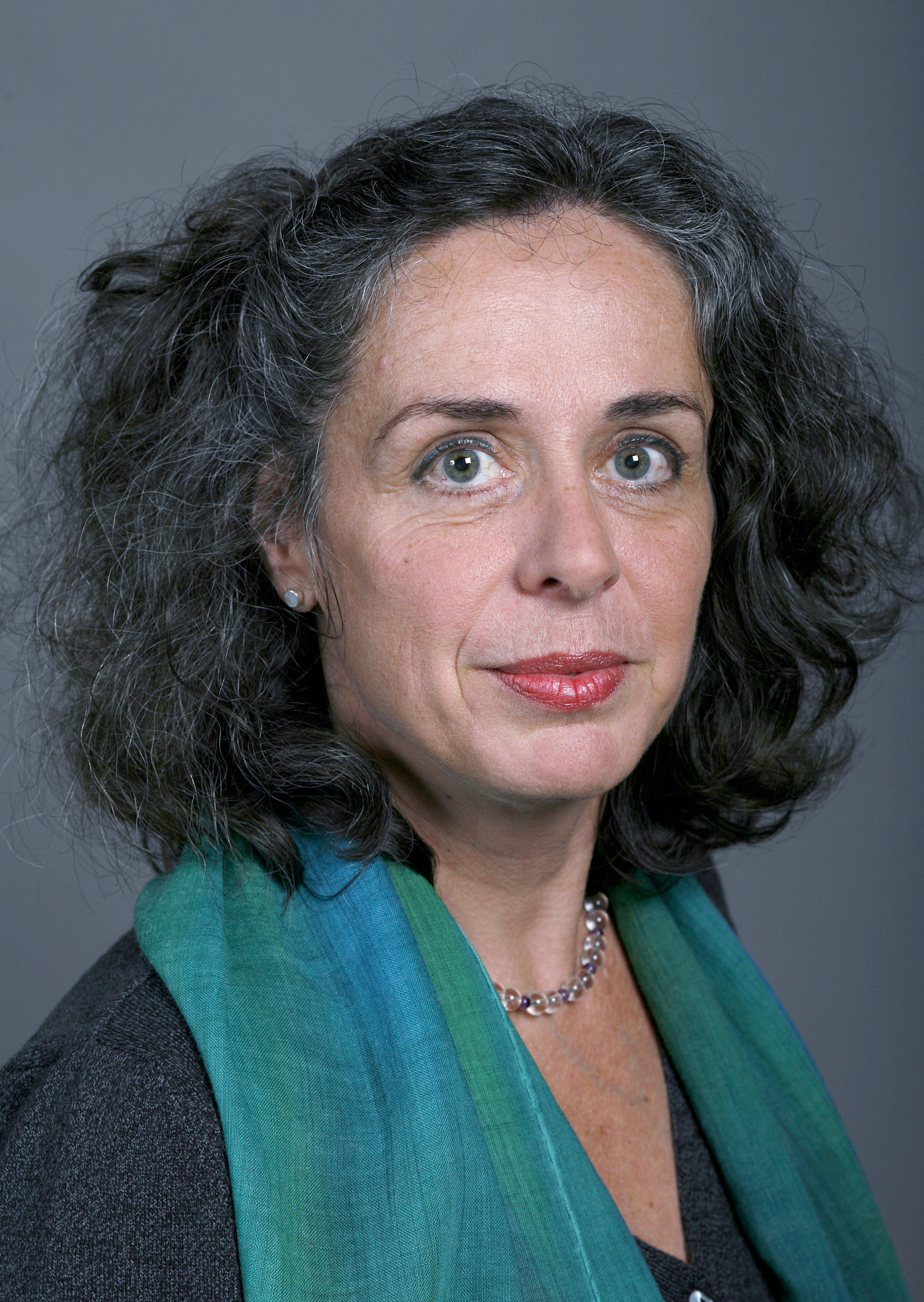
- Marlies Bänziger in 2008
- In office 2007–2011

Personal details
- Born: 14 March 1960 (age 66) Winterthur, Canton of Zürich, Switzerland
- Party: Green Party of Switzerland
- Children: 2
- Education: University of Zurich
- Occupation: politician
- Profession: educator

Marlies Bänziger (born 14 March 1960) is a Swiss politician of the Green Party of Switzerland.

== Political career ==
Marlies Bänziger joined the Green Party of Switzerland in the 1980s. In May 1990 she was elected to the municipal parliament (Gemeinderat) of Winterthur. From 2000 to 2005 Bänziger represented the municipality of Winterthur as a member of the cantonal parliament. From June 2004 to January 2008 she was co-president, in co-operation with Balthasar Glättli, and president of the Green Party of the canton of Zürich by November 2009. Bänziger was elected to the National Council (Nationalrat) in the Swiss federal election in October 2007, but the following legislature she failed the majority of votes by just 103 votes in October 2011.

== Mandatory work ==
From 1997 to 2009 she was elected as a councillor (Bezirksrätin) of the district of Winterthur. Among the parliament commissions, Bänziger was a member of the finance committee of the Swiss upper and lower parliament houses, and a member of the Swiss EFTA delegation. As constitutional councilor, in 2000 Bänziger became actively involved in the drafting of the new constitution of the Canton of Zürich, which was approved by the voters in 2005. In November 2008 Bänziger was elected president of the Swiss air emissions association (SSF), and in September 2009 she became president of Fussverkehr Schweiz, a pedestrian organisation.

== Personal life ==
Born in Winterthur, Marlies Bänziger was raised in Oberembrach and in Winterthur; she has the citizenship (Heimatort) of Heiden AR and Schüpfen by marriage. Bänziger acquired Maturität and the patent as a primary school teacher (Primarlehrer) at the Gymnasium in Winterthur, and worked for a short time as a flight attendant. She's a single mother of a daughter and a son.
