= Jean-Philippe Maitre =

Swiss politician (1949–2006)

Jean-Philippe Maitre (18 June 1949, Geneva – 1 February 2006) was a Swiss politician, member of the Swiss National Council (1983–2005). He was President of the National Council from 29 November 2004, until he resigned on 1 March 2005, due to a brain tumor.

Maitre studied law at the University of Geneva and practiced as an attorney in Geneva.

From 1973 to 1985 he was member of the cantonal parliament of Geneva. In 1985, Maitre was elected to the government of the canton of Geneva (Conseil d'Etat). He resigned in 1997, after presiding the council that year.

Maitre was married and father of three.

Preceded by Max Binder	President of the Swiss National Council; 2004/2005	Succeeded by Thérèse Meyer
