= Liliane Maury Pasquier =

Swiss politician

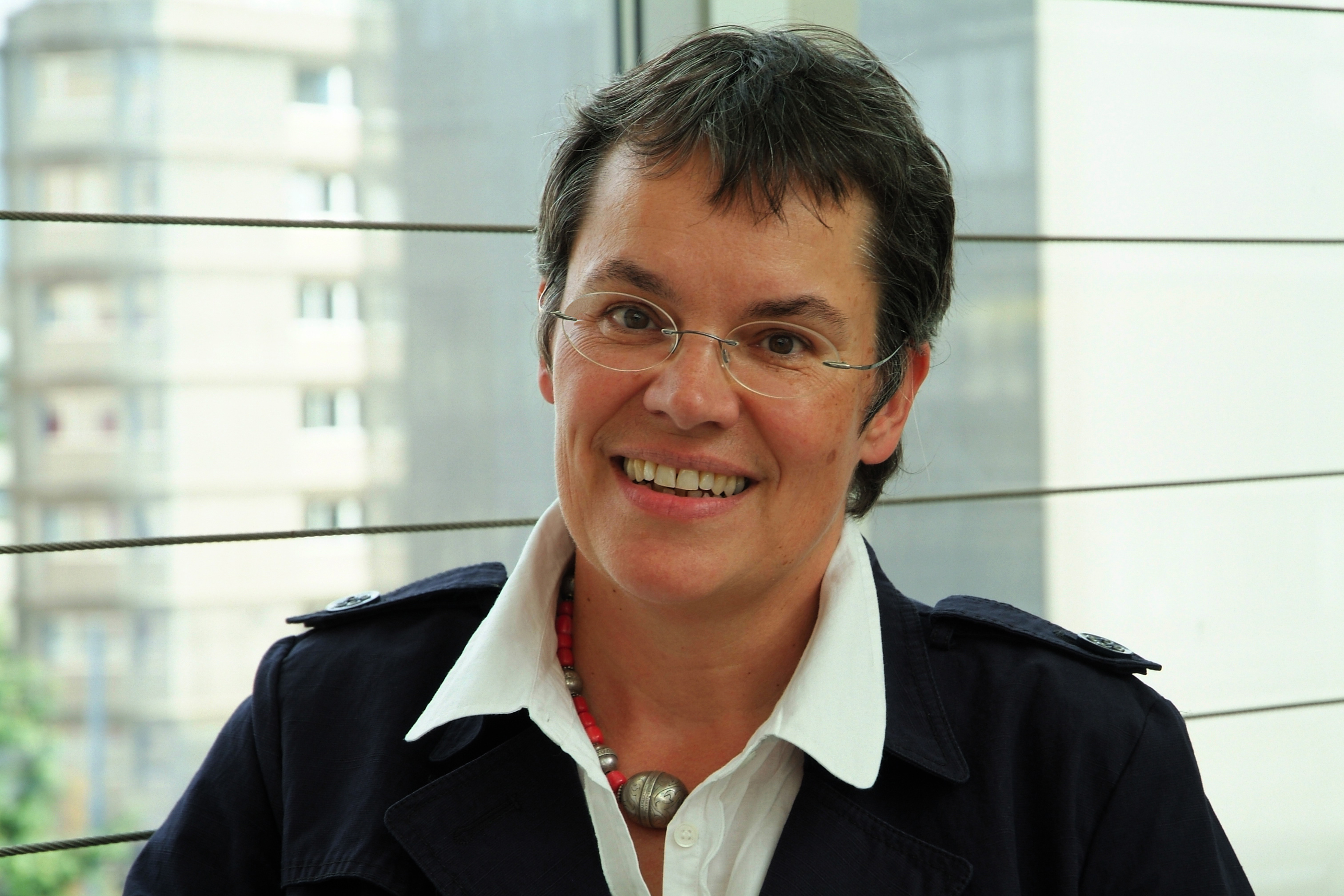

Personal details
- Born: 16 December 1956 (age 69) Geneva, Switzerland
- Party: Social Democratic Party

Liliane Maury Pasquier (born 16 December 1956 in Geneva) is a Swiss politician, member of the Social Democratic Party of Switzerland, elected to the Swiss Council of States for the canton of Geneva in 2007, and is currently a member of a delegation that cooperates with the French parliament to foster cooperation between the countries. From 2018 until 2020, she served as the President of the Parliamentary Assembly of the Council of Europe.

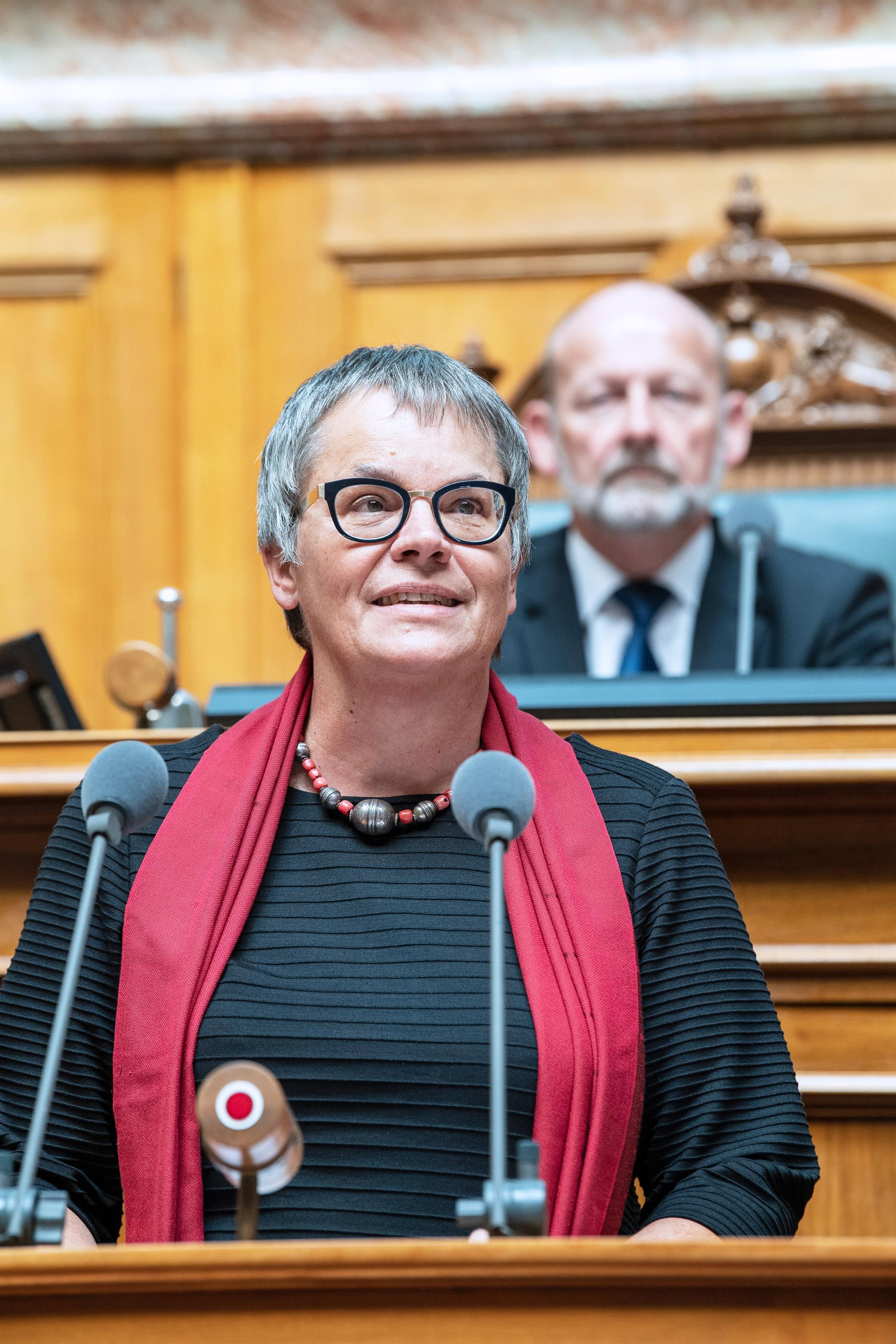
Liliane Maury Pasquier in 2018.

== Political career ==
A member of the Swiss delegation to the Parliamentary Assembly of the Council of Europe since 2012, Maury Pasquier has served on a number of committees, including the Committee on Political Affairs and Democracy and the Committee on the Honouring of Obligations and Commitments by Member States of the Council of Europe (Monitoring Committee). In addition, she was chairwoman of the Committee on Rules of Procedure, Immunities and Institutional Affairs as well as the co-rapporteur for the monitoring of Russia (alongside former Greek foreign minister Dora Bakoyannis). She was also part of a PACE pre-electoral delegation to Armenia ahead of the 2017 national elections. She led the Socialist Group within the Assembly before being elected its President in June 2018. She was the 32nd President of the Assembly since its creation in 1949, and only the fourth woman to hold the post.

== Political positions ==
On 20 March 2008, Maury Pasquier was reported in the media for remarks critical of Swiss Foreign Minister, Micheline Calmy-Rey for having worn a headscarf to a meeting with Iranian President Mahmoud Ahmadinejad to sign a gas contract, alleging that it had offended Iranian feminists.

In 2011, Maury Pasquier called on Swiss banks to ban investments in companies associated with anti-personnel mines and cluster munitions, following findings according to which 16 Swiss companies are among 166 leading financial institutions worldwide that are funding cluster bomb and parts manufacturing.

Preceded by Peter Hess	President of the National Council; 2001–2002	Succeeded by Yves Christen
