= Jacques Neirynck =

Belgian-Swiss academic and politician (1931–2025)

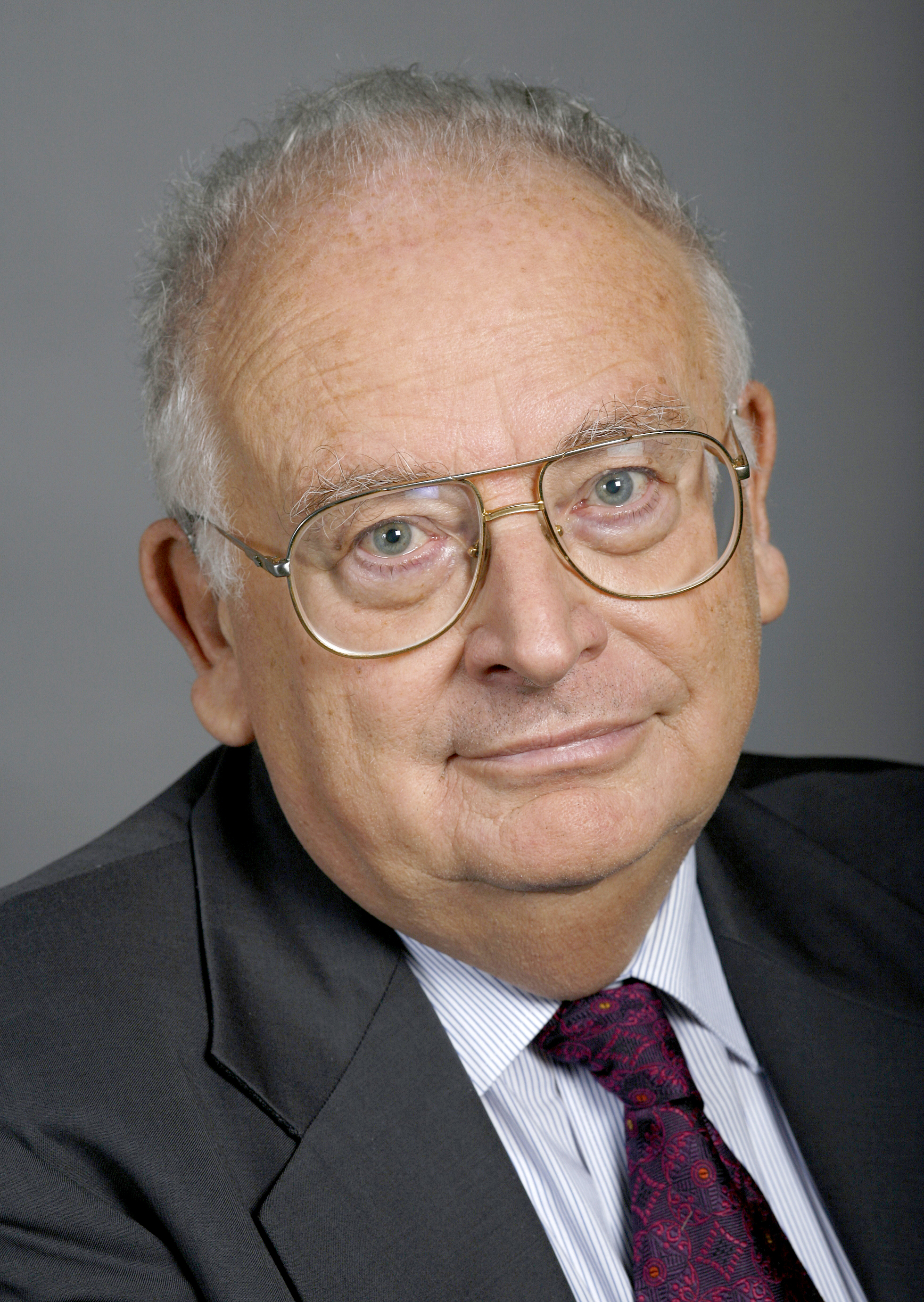

Member of the National Council
- In office 3 December 2007 – 30 November 2015

Member of the National Council
- In office 6 December 1999 – 30 November 2003

Personal details
- Born: 17 August 1931 Uccle, Belgium
- Died: 24 July 2025 (aged 93) Écublens, Vaud, Switzerland
- Party: Christian Democratic People's Party (PDC)
- Education: Catholic University of Leuven (1834–1968)

Jacques Julien Neirynck (17 August 1931 – 24 July 2025) was a Belgian-Swiss writer, politician and academic who was a professor at the École polytechnique fédérale de Lausanne (EPFL).

== Life and career ==
Neirynck was born in Uccle, Belgium in 1931. He studied electrical engineering at UCLouvain, eventually graduating with a PhD in 1958 and then becoming a professor. Around 1994, he became a Swiss citizen. Neirynck died in Écublens, Vaud on 24 July 2025, at the age of 93.

He was a member of the Christian Democratic People's Party of Switzerland. He was a member of the National Council between 1999 and 2003 as well as between 2007 and 2015.

== See also ==
- List of members of the National Council of Switzerland, 2007–11
- Presses polytechniques et universitaires romandes
