= Thérèse Meyer =

Swiss politician

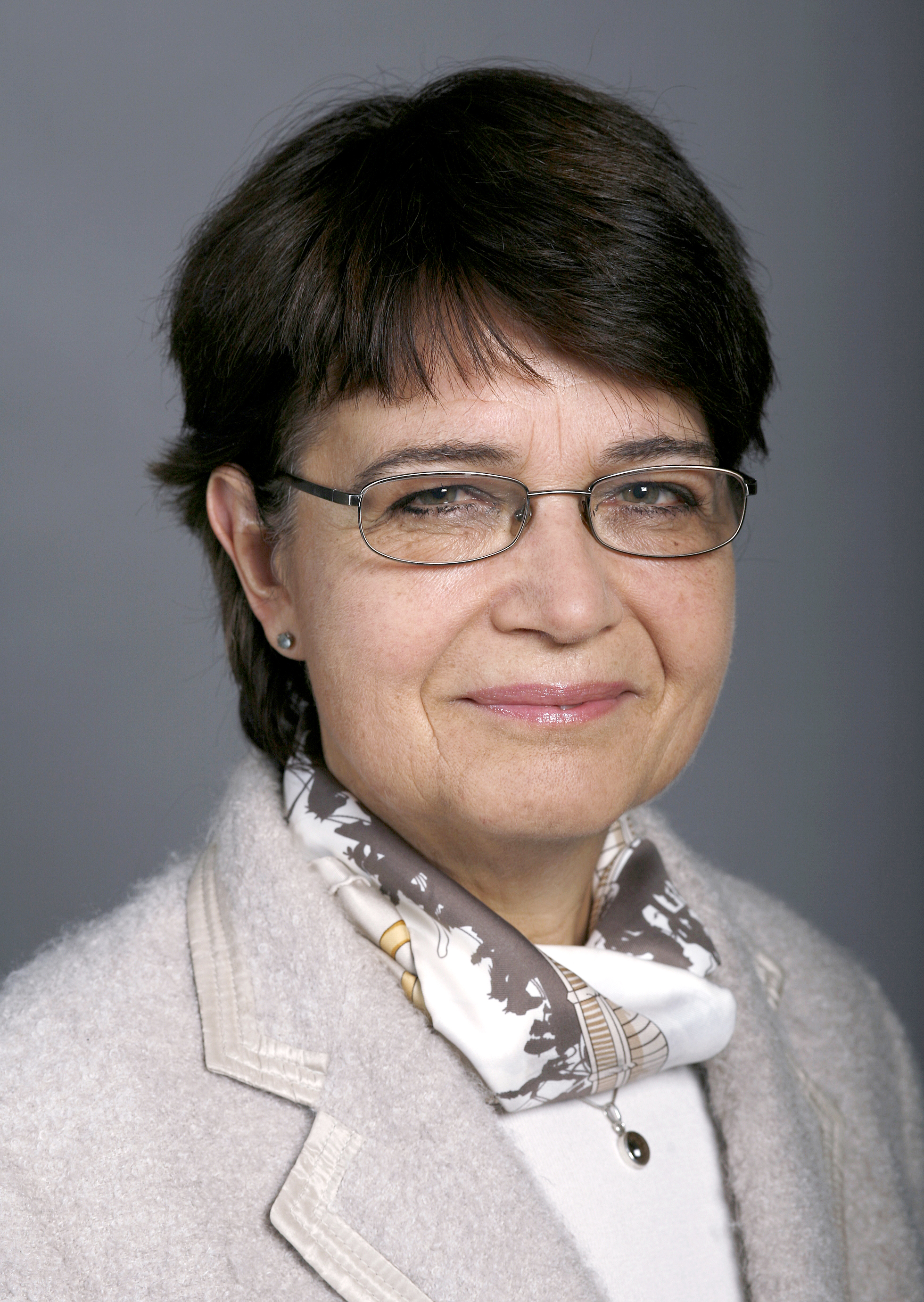
Thérèse Meyer

Thérèse Meyer-Kaelin (born 17 May 1948, in Châtel-Saint-Denis) is a Swiss politician. She is a member of the Swiss National Council and President of the National Council for 2005.

Christian-democratic member of the local Parliament of Estavayer-le-Lac from 1980 to 1982. Member of the Municipal council from 1982 to 1991. Mayor of Estavayer-le-Lac from 1991 to 1991. Member of the cantonal Parliament of Fribourg from 1996 to 1999. Became member of the National Council after Joseph Deiss' election to the Federal Council. Speaker from 8 March 2005 to 28 November 2005 after Jean-Philippe Maitre's retirement for health reasons. Paid official visits to Austria, Tunisia and Ireland. Attended the second summit of Speakers in New York in September 2005.

Member of the Committee for Health and Social Security since 1999 and then also of the Committee for Political Institutions from 2003 to date. From 1999 to 2003, member of the French Speaking Parliamentarians Assembly.

Meyer is married to Dr. Claude Meyer and mother of three.

Preceded by Jean-Philippe Maitre	President of the Swiss National Council; 2005	Succeeded by Claude Janiak
