= Hansjörg Walter =

Swiss politician (born 1951)

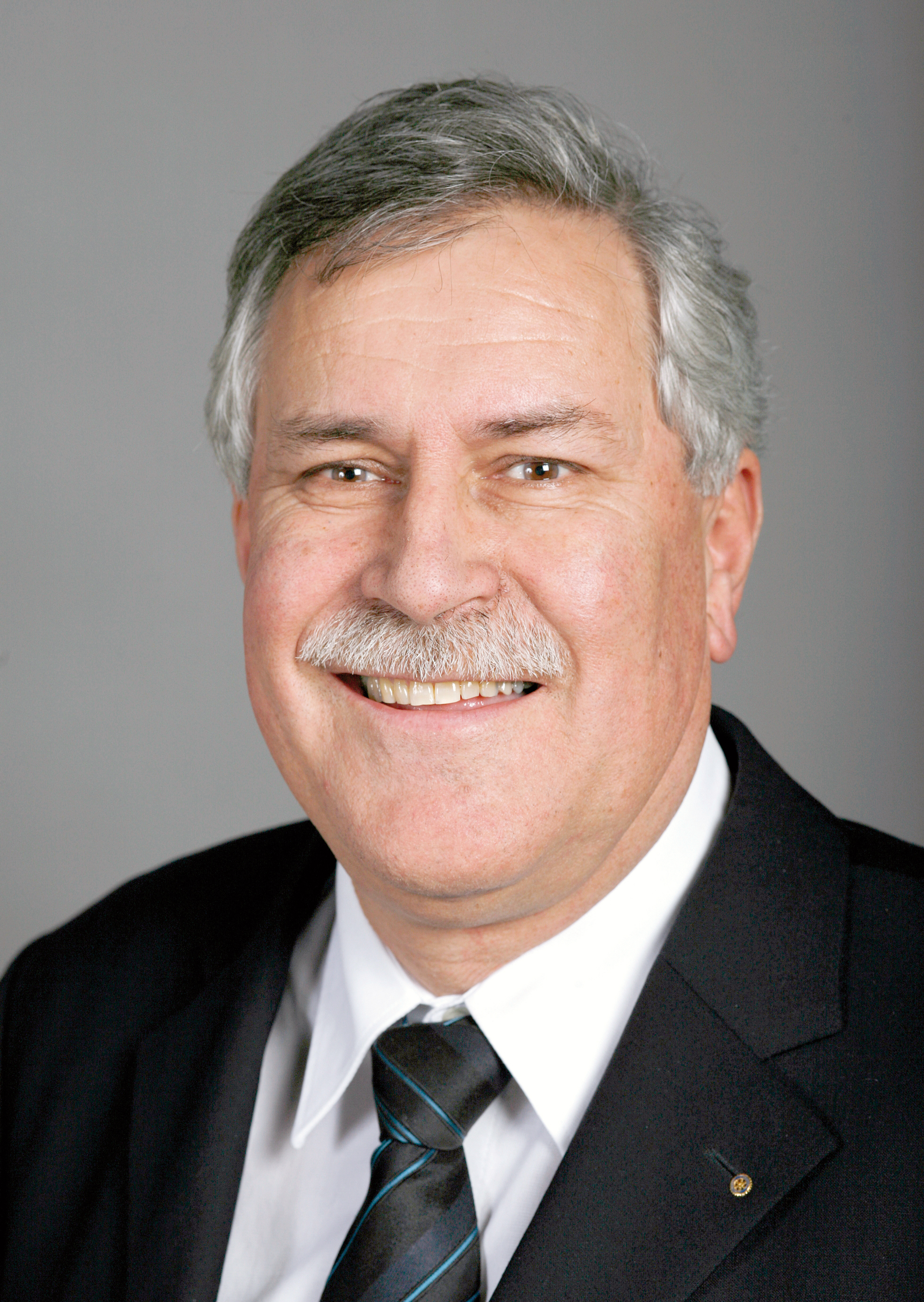

Personal details
- Born: 5 February 1951 (age 74) Frauenfeld, Switzerland
- Party: Swiss People's Party

Hansjörg Walter (born 5 February 1951, in Frauenfeld) is a Swiss politician of the Swiss People's Party. He was a member of the Swiss National Council for the canton of Thurgau (1999–2017) and president of the Swiss Farmers' Union (2000–2012). Walter served as the President of the National Council (2011–2012).

== Biography ==
Walter graduated from the Agricultural School Strickhof and underwent advanced agricultural and commercial training. In 1983, he graduated as a master farmer (Meisterlandwirt) and took over the Greuthof farm near Wängi from his parents.

His career in politics began with the vice presidency of the Wängi elementary school in 1985. He served in the municipal government of Wängi from 1995 to 2002 and in the cantonal parliament of Thurgau from 1992 to 1999, at which time he was elected to the National Council. He was reelected in 2003, 2007 and 2011 with the second highest number of votes and in 2015 with the highest number of votes of all candidates in Thurgau.

In the 2008 Swiss Federal Council election, Walter came close to being elected Federal Councillor despite his prior declaration that he would not accept an election. Supported by the parties left of the center, he obtained one vote less than the eventual victor and official People's Party candidate Ueli Maurer.

Walter has served in the Swiss Army with the rank of major.

He is a member of a Campaign for an Independent and Neutral Switzerland.

Preceded by Jean-René Germanier	President of the National Council; 2011–2012	Succeeded by Maya Graf
