= Josef Zisyadis =

Swiss politician

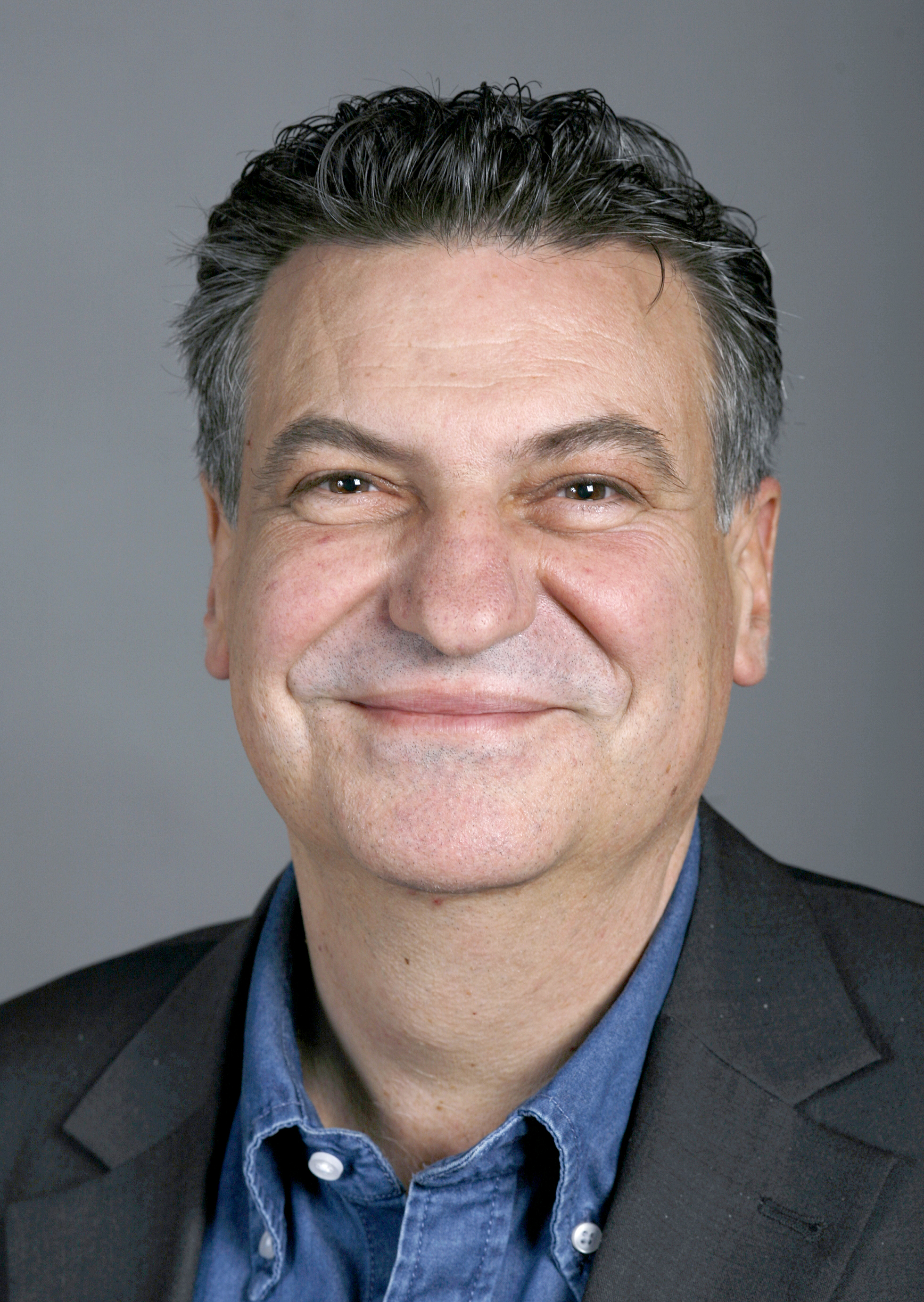
Josef Zisyadis, in 2007.

Josef Zisyadis (born 17 April 1956) is a Swiss politician, a member of the Swiss Party of Labour, and of the Alternative Left (since 2010). Born to Greek parents in Istanbul, and after a sojourn in Athens (1958–1962), he moved to Switzerland with his family in 1962, aged seven, and was later naturalized as citizen of Lausanne. He studied theology in Lausanne, graduating in 1979. During 1979-1983 he worked as pastor in the Mission populaire évangélique in Paris, returning to Lausanne in 1983, where he joined the Parti Ouvrier Populaire of Vaud. During 1994–1996, he acted as secretary of the Party of Labour.

He was a member of the Swiss National Council (1991–1996, 1999–2011) representing the Canton of Vaud. During 1996–1998, he was a member of the cantonal government of Vaud (Conseil d'Etat), heading the department of Justice, Police and Military affairs.

At the October 2007 federal elections, Zisyadis failed to win reelection, however, on 1 November 2007 successful party candidate Marianne Huguenin announced her resignation from the National Council to focus on her position as mayor of Renens, leaving Zizyadis to take the Party's seat in the National Council representing Vaud. Zisyadis since the founding of the new party Alternative Left in 2010 is a member of that party, but also stays member of the Swiss Party of Labour. Zisyadis again failed to retain his mandate in the 2011 elections, his seat passing to the Social Democrats. The Alternative Left coalition gathered 1.2% of the popular vote nationwide; with the loss of Zisyadis' seat, the far-left loses all representation at the federal level.

== See also ==
- Culinary Heritage of Switzerland
