= Adèle Thorens Goumaz =

Swiss politician

Adèle Thorens-Goumaz
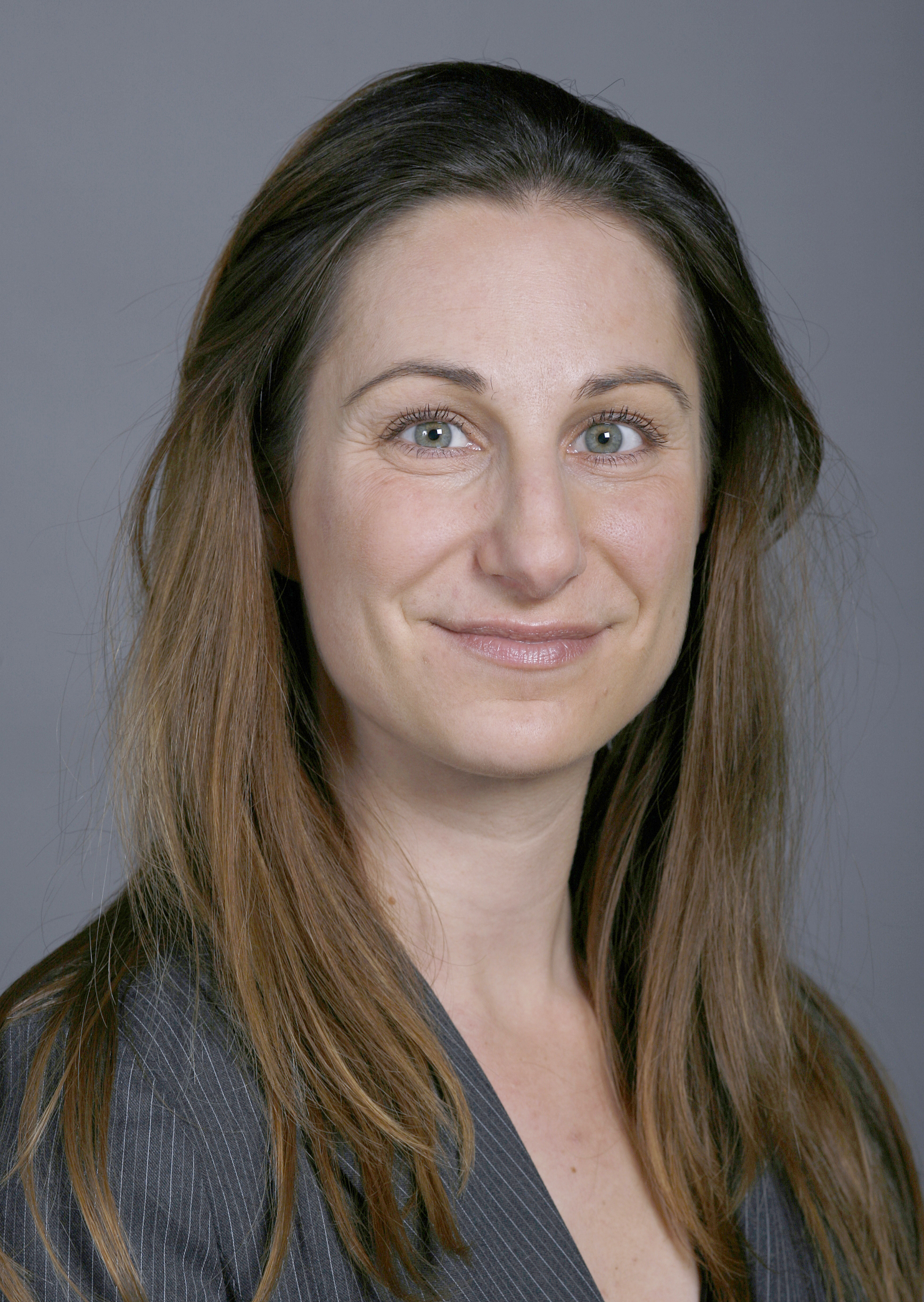

Member of the Council of States
- Preceded by: Géraldine Savary
- Incumbent
- Assumed office 2 December 2019
- Constituency: Vaud

Member of the National Council of Switzerland
- In office 3 December 2007 – 1 December 2019
- Succeeded by: Valentine Python
- Constituency: Vaud

Co-leader of the Green Party of Switzerland (with Regula Rytz)
- In office 12 April 2012 – 16 April 2016
- Preceded by: Ueli Leuenberger
- Succeeded by: Regula Rytz

Personal details
- Born: 15 December 1971 (age 54) Solothurn, Switzerland
- Party: Green Party of Switzerland
- Education: University of Lausanne
- Occupation: Politician

Adèle Thorens Goumaz (born 15 December 1971 in Solothurn) is a Swiss politician. She has been a member of the Council of States since December 2019. Previously, she served in the National Council of Switzerland from the Canton of Vaud from 2007 to 2019. She was elected as the co-president of the Green Party of Switzerland with Regula Rytz in 2012 and announced that she would not run for re-election in 2016, leaving the post solely in Rytz's hands.
