= Marianne Huguenin =

Swiss politician

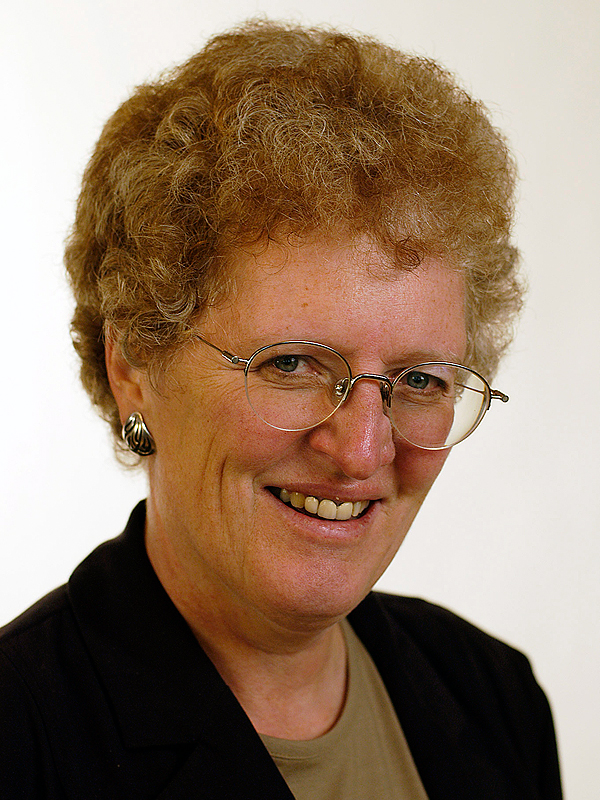

Syndic of Renens
- In office 2006 – 30 June 2016

Member of the National Council
- In office 1 December 2003 – 2 December 2007

Personal details
- Born: May 1, 1950 (age 75) Bern, Switzerland
- Citizenship: Swiss
- Party: PST-POP
- Profession: Medical doctor

Marianne Huguenin (born 1 May 1950 in Bern) is a former Swiss politician and member of the Swiss Party of Labour, who was elected to the Swiss National Council representing the Canton of Vaud from 2003 to 2007. A lesbian, she was the first openly gay politician in French-speaking Switzerland.

== Biography ==
Originally trained as a medical doctor, she served as a deputy in the Grand Council of Vaud from 1990 to 1999 and was president of the Vaud Cantonal branch of the Swiss Party of Labour from 1988 to 1995.

From 1996 to 2006, she served as a municipal councilor in the city of Renens, before becoming Syndic (mayor) of the city from 2006 to 2016.

In 2003 she was elected to the National Council and reelected in 2007. 11 days after the 2007 election, on 1 November 2007, Huguenin announced her resignation from the National Council in favour of Josef Zisyadis to focus on her position as mayor of Renens.

In 2004, Huguenin was the first French-speaking Swiss politician to come out as gay and in 2005 she campaigned for same-sex partnership recognition in the country's successful referendum on the issue.
