= Max Binder =

Swiss politician (born 1947)

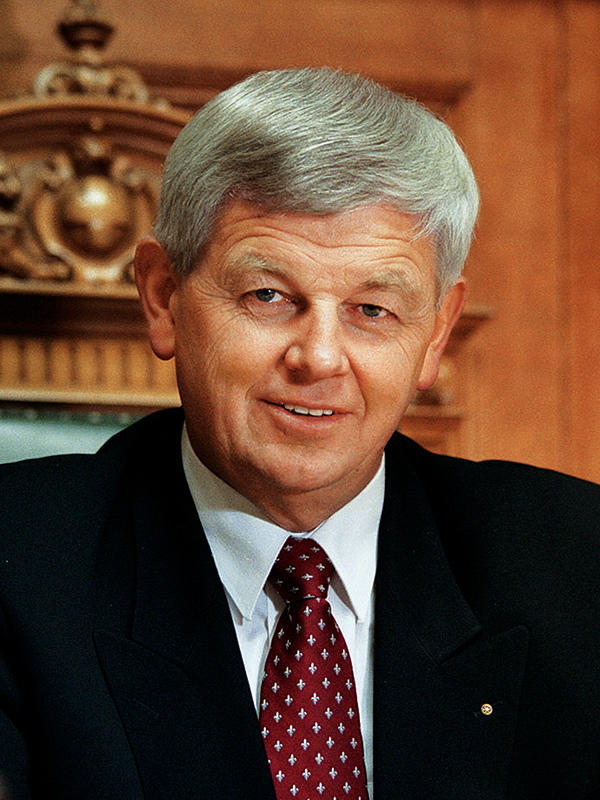

Councillor of State of Valais
- In office 25 November 1991 – 29 November 2015

President of the National Council of Switzerland
- In office 1 November 2003 – 29 November 2004
- Preceded by: Yves Christen
- Succeeded by: Jean-Philippe Maitre

Personal details
- Born: 26 November 1947 (age 77); Illnau-Effretikon, Switzerland
- Political party: Swiss People's Party
- Profession: farmer

Max Binder (born 26 November 1947) is a Swiss politician. He was a member of the National Council from the Canton of Zurich from 1991 to 2015 and served as the President (speaker) of the National Council from 2003 to 2004. A farmer by profession, he was member of the parliament of the canton of Zurich from 1985 to 1990. Since 1990, he is a municipal councilor in Illnau-Effretikon in charge of the Health Department.

He was elected to the National Council in 1991 as a candidate of the Swiss People's Party and re-elected 11 times. He paid visits to India as deputy Speaker (1993) and Bulgaria and Canada as Speaker (2004).

Preceded by Yves Christen	President of the Swiss National Council; 2003/2004	Succeeded by Jean-Philippe Maitre
