= Regula Rytz =

Swiss historian and politician

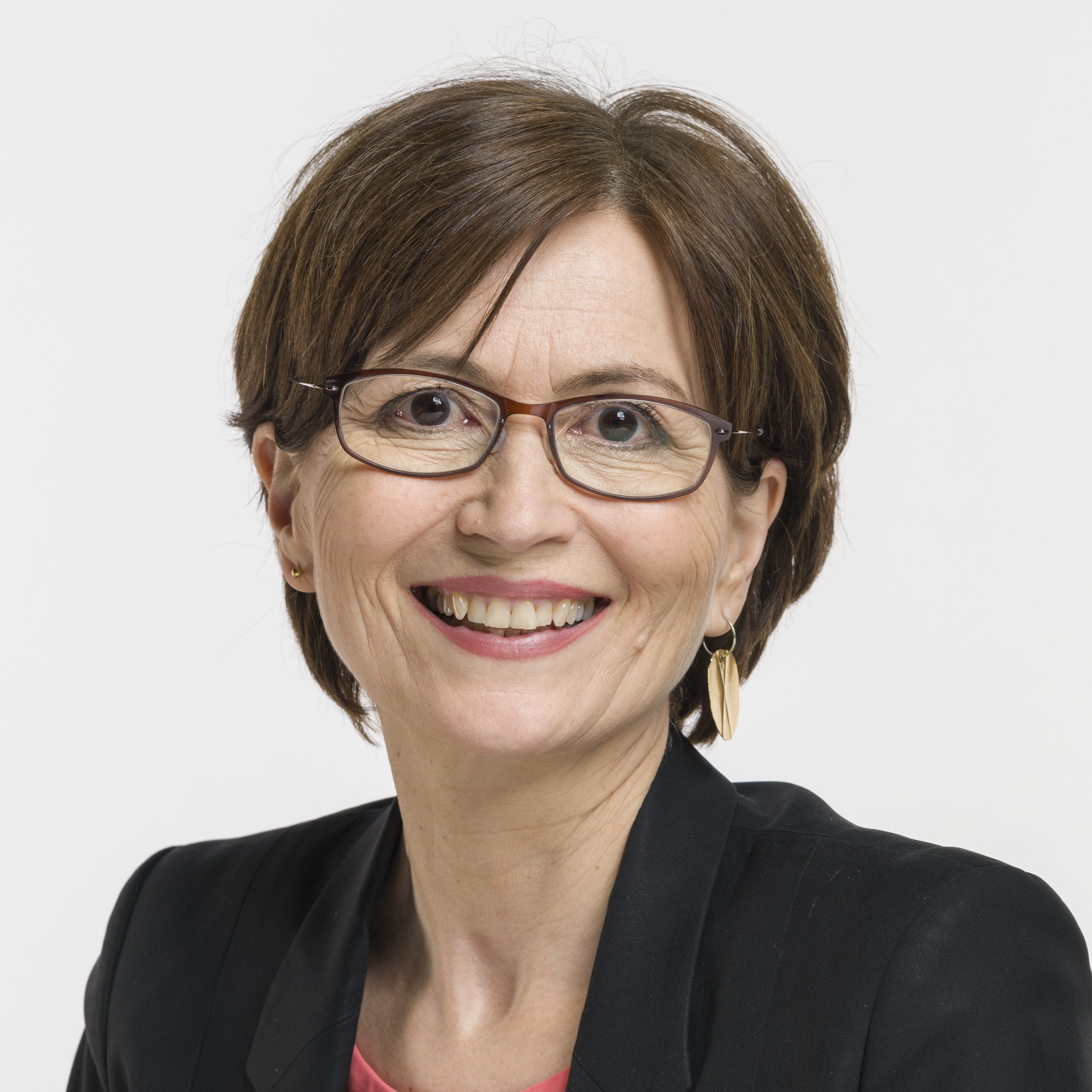
- Official portrait, 2019

Member of the National Council (Switzerland)
- In office 5 December 2011 – 9 May 2022
- Constituency: Canton of Bern

President of the Green Party of Switzerland
- In office 16 April 2016 – 20 June 2020
- Preceded by: Co-presidency with Adèle Thorens Goumaz
- Succeeded by: Balthasar Glättli

Personal details
- Born: 2 March 1962 (age 64) Thun, Canton of Bern, Switzerland
- Party: Green Party of Switzerland
- Spouse: Michael Jordi
- Occupation: Politician
- Profession: Historian, sociologist, constitutional lawyer
- Website: Official website Parliament website

Regula Rytz (Swiss Standard German: [ˈreːɡʊla ˈriːts]; born 2 March 1962) is a Swiss historian and politician who served on the National Council (Switzerland) for the Green Party from 2011 to 2022. She concurrently served as co-president of the Green Party of Switzerland from 2012 to 2016 and as president from 2016 to 2020.

== Early life and education ==
Rytz was born 2 March 1962 in Thun, Switzerland, the second of three children, to Rudolf Rytz (1934–2021), an architect, and Gisela Rytz (née Flören; 1936–2024). She has older and two younger brothers. Rytz was partially raised in Muri bei Bern and completed the teacher seminary (teacher's college) in 1983. She then taught at primary schools until 1989. Rytz then studied history, sociology, and constitutional law at the University of Bern, graduating with a master's degree in 1997.

== Professional career ==
From 1993 to 1998, Rytz was political secretary of the Green Alliance Bern. From 1998 to 2000, she conducted research on the topic of "Violence in everyday life and organized crime" as part of the Swiss National Science Foundation programme. From 2001 to 2004, she was central secretary of the Swiss Trade Union Federation. From 2005 to 2012, she was a member of the city government of the federal capital of Bern and, in this capacity, also chairwoman of the board of directors of the transport company Bernmobil. Since 2012, Rytz has been president of the Cantonal Commission for Gender Equality, a member of the Board of Directors of the Biel transport company and vice president of the university and Society Forum of the University of Bern.

After resigning from the national parliament, Rytz set up her own business as a consultant. In June 2022, she was elected President of Helvetas, a Swiss organisation for development cooperation and humanitarian aid. Shortly afterwards, she launched an appeal for "Global Justice", which was signed by personalities from the worlds of culture, politics and business and calls for Switzerland to make an appropriate contribution to combating poverty and achieving the Social Development Goals.

== Political career ==
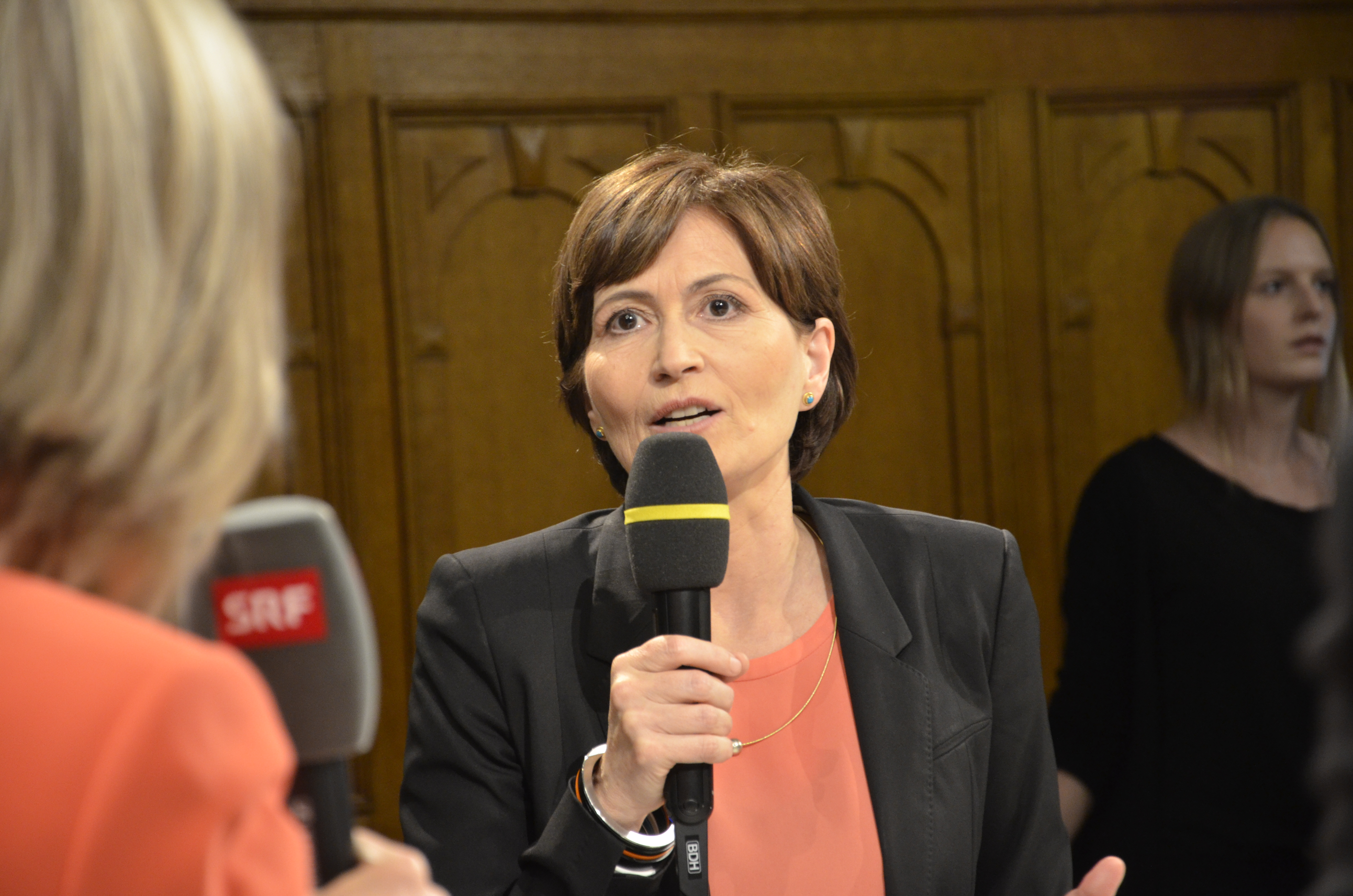
TV interview after the 2019 Swiss federal election

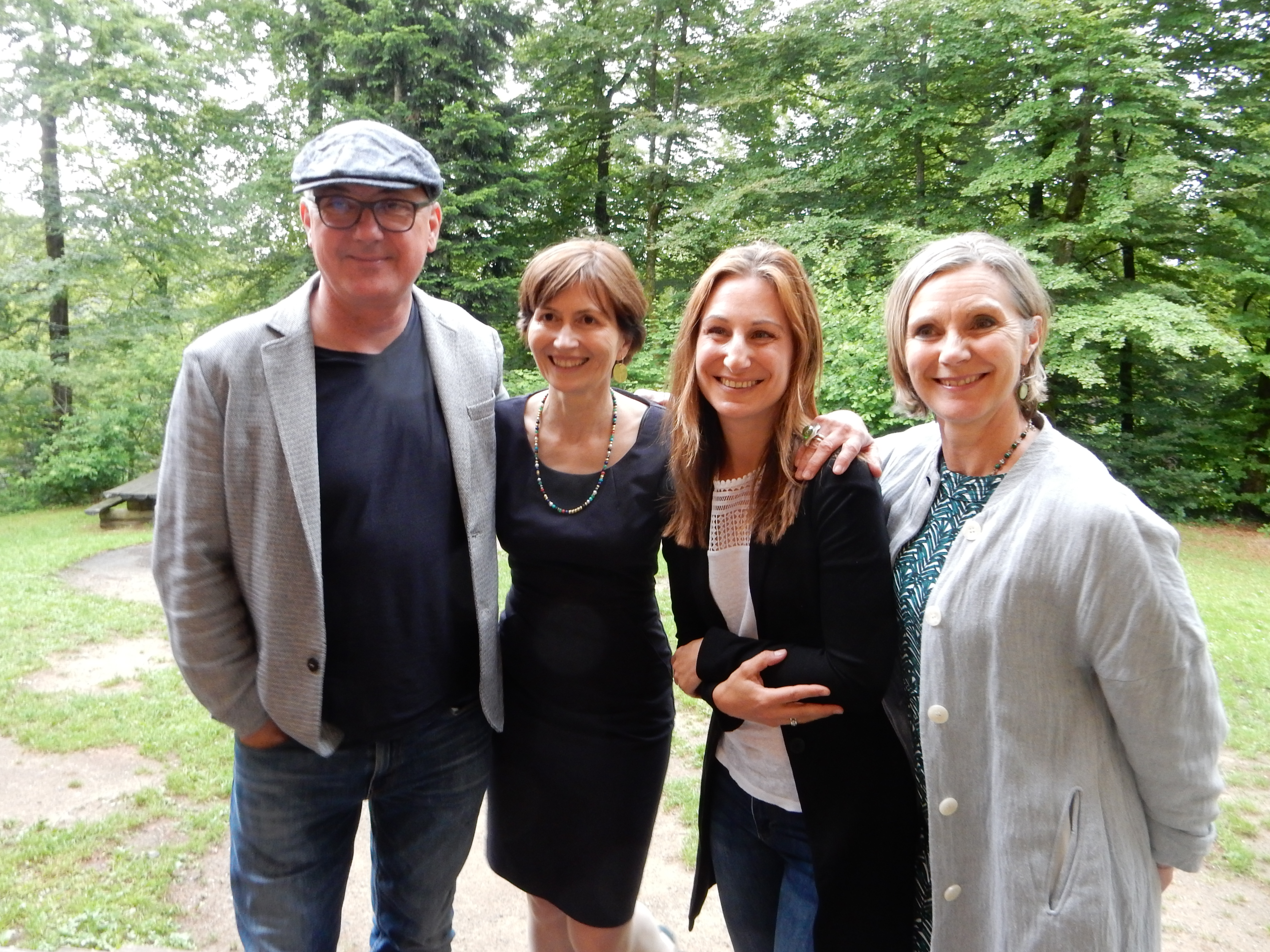
Rytz (second from the left) with other politicians of the green party

Rytz was a member of the Grand Council of the Canton of Bern (parliament) from April 1994 to April 2005. From January 2001 to April 2005, she was President of the Green Alliance of the City of Bern. In October 2004, she was elected to the municipal council (executive) of the City of Bern and took over the Department of Civil Engineering, Transport and Urban Greenery (TVS) with 750 employees. In November 2008, she was re-elected as a municipal councillor for a further four years with the best result of all those elected. She was elected to the National Council in the national parliamentary elections on 23 October 2011 and was re-elected in both October 2015 and October 2019. In the 2019 National Council elections, she received the most panache votes in the canton of Bern. She was a member of the Committee for Transport and Telecommunications (KVF) from 2013 to 2018 and sat on the Committee for Economic Affairs and Taxation (WAK) from March 2018, as spokesperson for economic policy of the Swiss Green Party.

In April 2022, it was announced that she would step down from the National Council after the special session in May and apparently take over the presidency of the development organisation Helvetas. She was replaced in the National Council by the Green Natalie Imboden. Her last day as a member of the National Council was on 9 May 2022.

On 21 April 2012, she and Adèle Thorens Goumaz were elected co-presidents of the Swiss Green Party. On 16 April 2016, the assembly of delegates of the Swiss Green Party elected Rytz as its sole president. On 20 June 2020, after a total of eight years - four of them as co-president with Thorens and four as sole president - she relinquished the presidency of the Swiss Green Party due to term limits.

After the historic election victory in the 2019 federal elections, the Swiss Greens claimed a seat for the FDP in the 2019 Federal Council election with Rytz as their candidate because, as the third-strongest force with two Federal Council seats, the FDP was overrepresented. Although Rytz failed, she received 82 votes, making her the Greens' most successful Federal Council candidate to date. Since 2023 Rytz is a delegate to the European Greens.

== Personal life ==
Rytz lives with her partner in the Breitenrain neighbourhood of Bern.
