= Jean-René Germanier =

Swiss politician (born 1958)

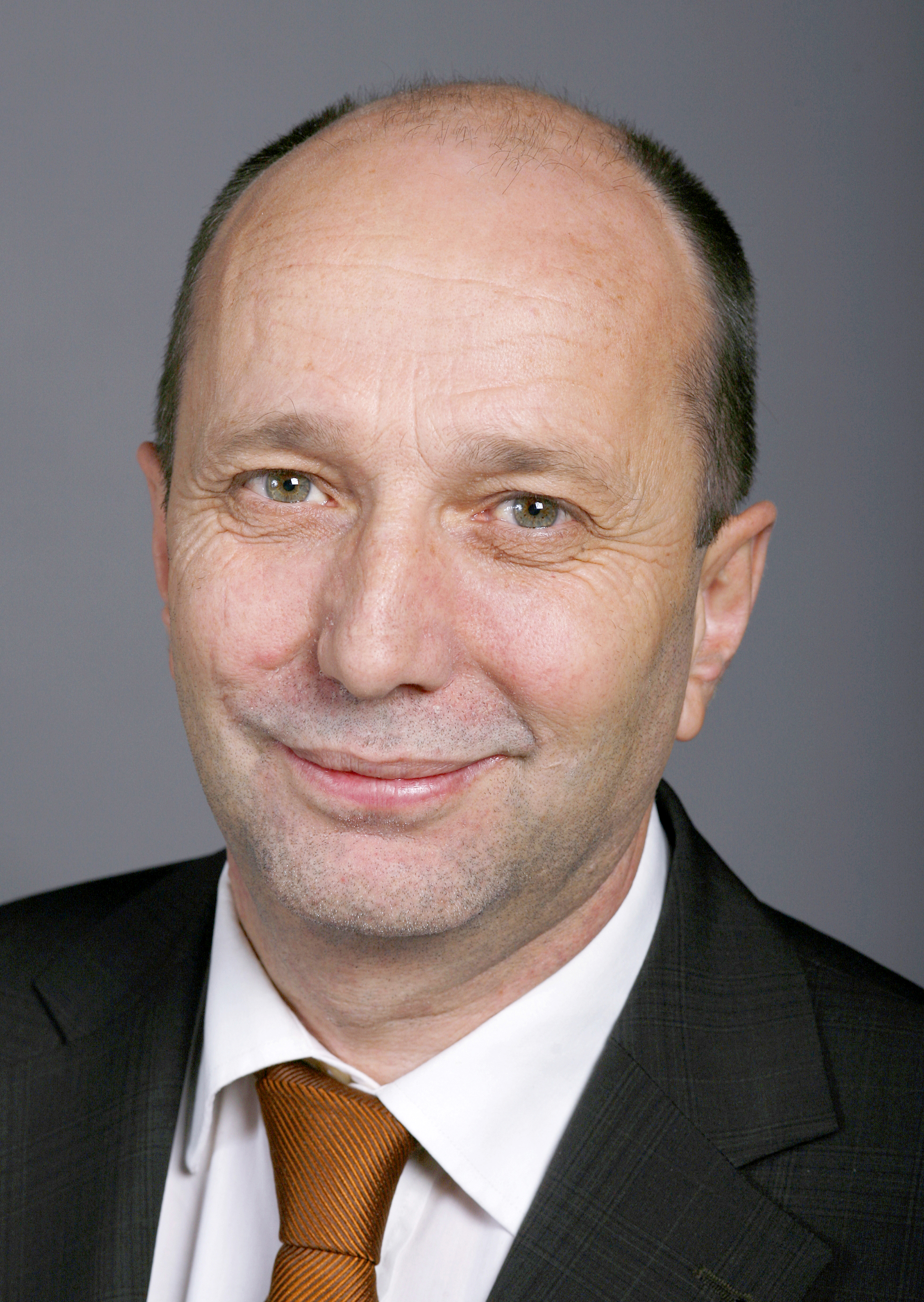

Personal details
- Born: 18 December 1958 (age 66); Sion, Switzerland
- Political party: FDP.The Liberals

Jean-René Germanier (born 12 December 1958) is a Swiss politician. He was first elected to the National Council for the canton of Valais. He was subsequently elected President of the National Council in 2010.

Germanier is an oenologist and winemaker. He lives in Vétroz and is father of a child. In the Swiss army, he held the rank of corporal.

Preceded by Pascale Bruderer	President of the National Council; 2010–2011	Succeeded by Hansjörg Walter
