= Thomas Hurter =

Swiss politician and aviator

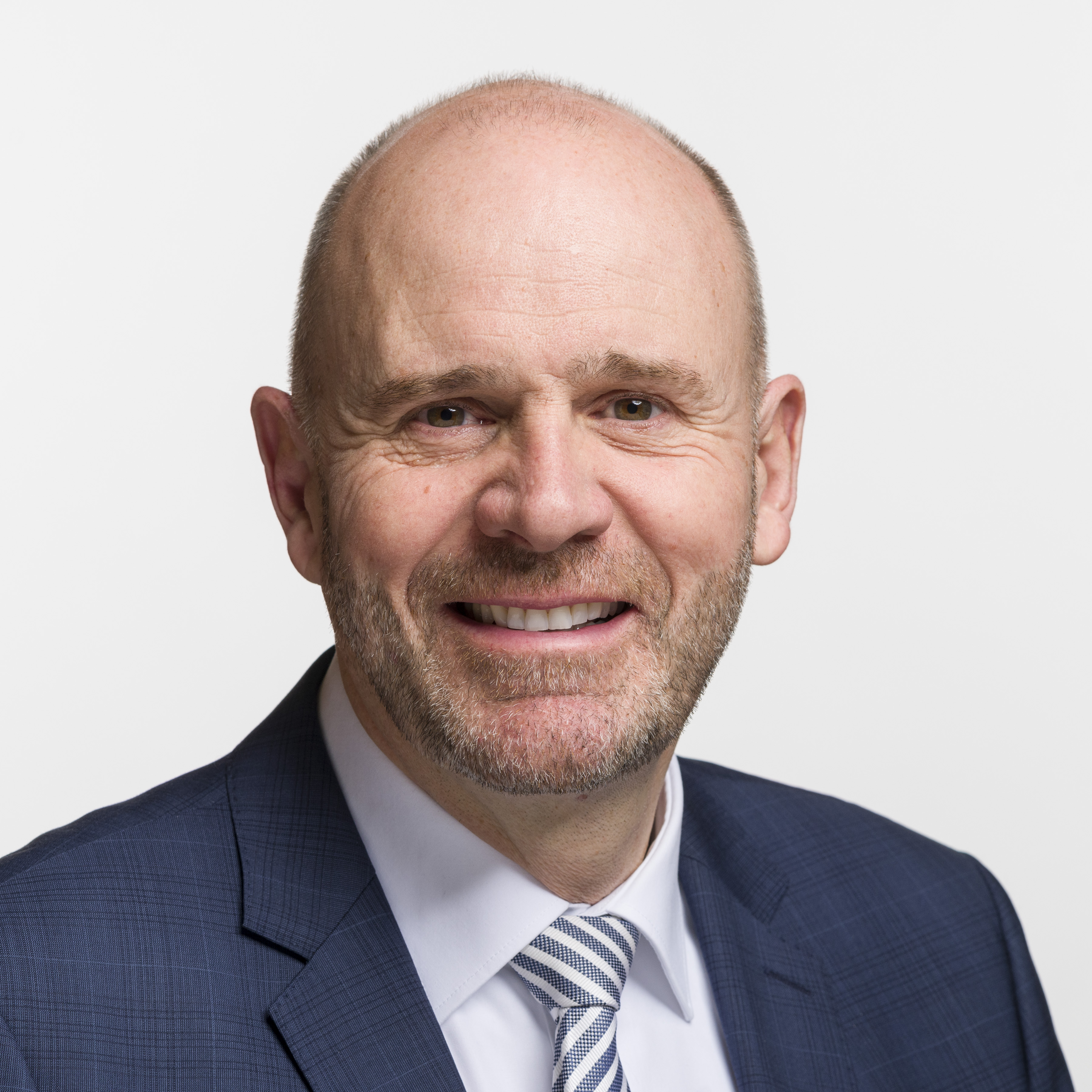
- Official portrait, 2019

Member of National Council (Switzerland)
- Incumbent
- Assumed office 3 December 2007
- Constituency: Canton of Schaffhausen

Personal details
- Born: Thomas August Hurter; November 1, 1963 (age 62) Zürich, Switzerland
- Party: Swiss People's Party
- Spouse: Cornelia Stamm (m. 1994)
- Children: 2
- Education: Heriot-Watt University (MBA)
- Occupation: Commercial pilot, politician
- Website: Official website

Military service
- Allegiance: Switzerland
- Branch/service: Swiss Air Force
- Rank: Captain

Thomas August Hurter (born 1 November 1963) is a Swiss politician and former commercial pilot. He currently serves as member of the National Council (Switzerland) for the Swiss People's Party since 2007. He also served on the Cantonal Council of Schaffhausen from 2005 to 2016. Since September 2016 he serves as president of Automobile Club of Switzerland. Hurter was previously a pilot for the Swiss Air Force and Swissair/Swiss International Air Lines. He is married to Cornelia Stamm Hurter, a member of the governing council of Schaffhausen.
