= Swiss Union of Public Service Personnel =

The Swiss Union of Public Service Personnel (German: Schweizerischer Verband des Personals öffentlicher Dienste, VPOD; French: Syndicat des services publics) is a trade union representing public sector workers in Switzerland.

The union was founded in 1905, as the Swiss Municipal and State Workers' Union. In 1920, it absorbed the Swiss Tram Union, and in 1924 it became VPOD. It affiliated to the Swiss Trade Union Federation, and became known for its political lobbying. Its membership steadily increased, reaching 18,505 in 1940, and 42,561 in 1980.

In its early years, the union's membership was mostly utility, tram and municipal building workers, but from the 1960s, education, social and heath workers became more prominent. As of 2017, the union had 34,252 members.

== Presidents ==
1905: Herman Greulich
1915:
1940: Ferdinand Böhny
1958: Herman Müller
1970: Ria Schärer
1982: Christiane Brunner
1989:
2003: Christine Goll
2010: Katharina Prelicz-Huber
2023: Christian Dandrès
