= Ruth Genner =

Swiss politician

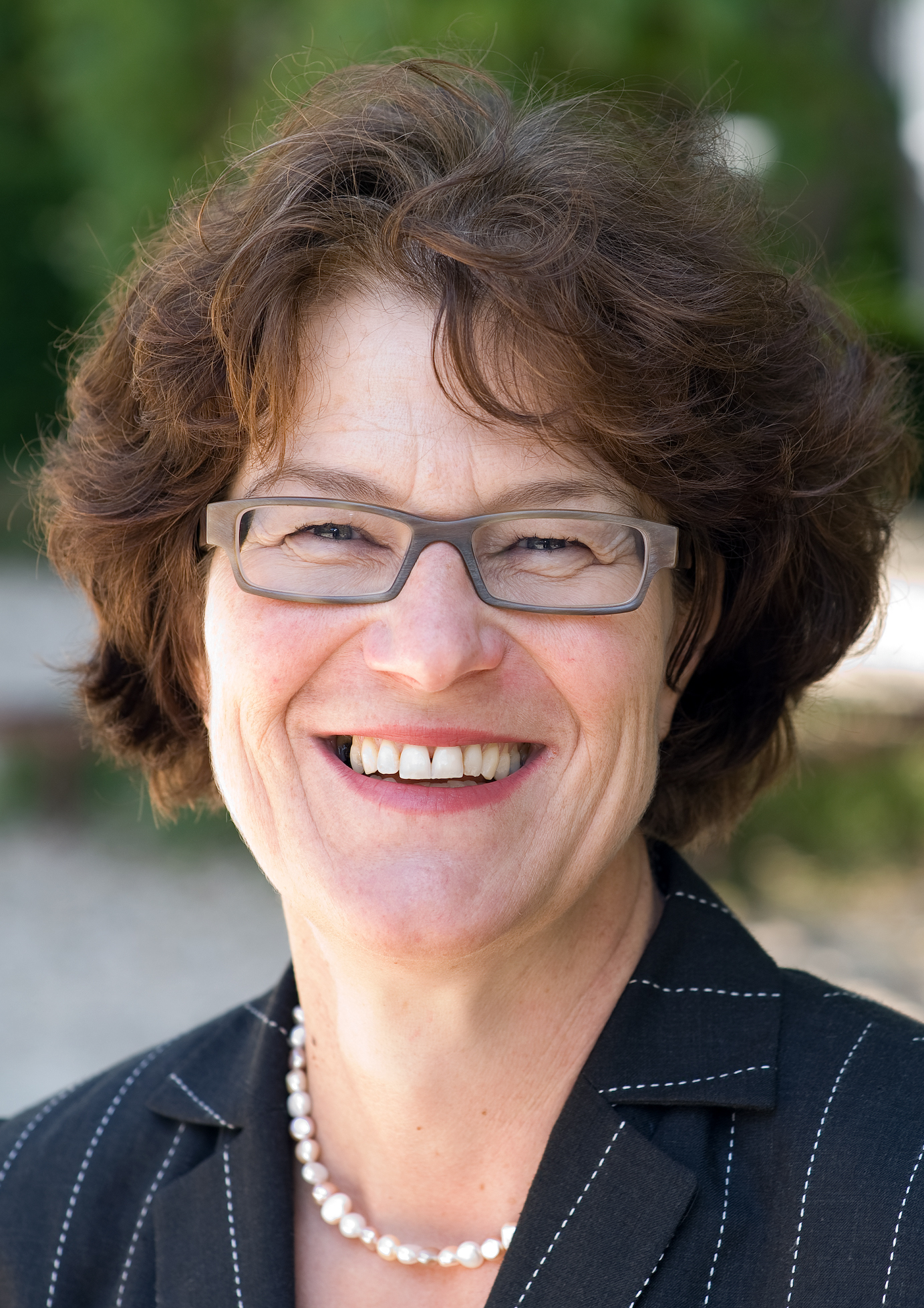
Genner in 2009

Ruth Genner (born 13 January 1956) is a Swiss politician. She was a member of the government of the city of Zürich (2008–2014), a member of the Swiss National Council (1998–2008) and leader of the Green Party of Switzerland (2001–2008). Genner was a member of the Council of Europe and regularly worked with the United Nations as the President of the Inter-European Parliamentary Forum on Population and Development.

Genner is a food engineer (Swiss Federal Institute of Technology). She was the chairman of the Swiss Aids Federation and in the board of directors of the company bio.inspecta.
