= Green Party of Switzerland =

Swiss political party

Green Party of Switzerland: GRÜNE Schweiz (German); Les VERT-E-S suisses (French); VERDI svizzeri (Italian); VERDA svizra (Romansh)
- President: Lisa Mazzone
- Founded: 28 May 1983; 43 years ago
- Headquarters: Waisenhausplatz 21, 3011 Bern
- Membership (2022): 13,000
- Ideology: Green politics
- Political position: Left-wing
- European affiliation: European Green Party
- International affiliation: Global Greens
- Colours: Green
- Federal Council: 0 / 7
- Council of States: 3 / 46
- National Council: 23 / 200
- Cantonal executives: 7 / 154
- Cantonal legislatures: 249 / 2,544

Website
- gruene.ch (German) verts.ch (French) verditicino.ch (Italian)

The Green Party of Switzerland (German: GRÜNE Schweiz; French: Les VERT-E-S suisses; Italian: VERDI svizzeri; Romansh: VERDA svizra) is a green political party in Switzerland. It is the fifth-largest party in the National Council of Switzerland and the largest party that is not represented on the Federal Council.

== History ==
The first Green party in Switzerland, MPE, was founded as a local party in 1971 in the town of Neuchâtel. In 1979, Daniel Brélaz was elected to the National Council as the first Green MP on the national level (in Switzerland and in the world). Local and regional Green parties and organisations were founded in many different towns and cantons in the following years.

In 1983, two different national green party federations were created: in May, diverse local green groups came together in Fribourg to form the Federation of Green Parties of Switzerland, and in June, some left-alternative groups formed the Green Alternative Party of Switzerland in Bern. In 1990, an attempt to combine these organisations failed. Afterward, some of the member groups from the Green Alternative Party joined the Federation of Green Parties which has become the de facto national Green party. In 1993, the Federation of Green Parties changed its name to the Green Party of Switzerland.

In 1985, Chaïm Nissim who in 1982 perpetrated a rocket attack on the Superphénix nuclear plant was elected to the Geneva cantonal legislature for the Swiss Green Party.

In 1986, the first two Green members of a cantonal government became members of the Regierungsrat of Bern.

In 1987, the Green Party of Switzerland joined the European Federation of Green Parties.

In the 1990s, members of the Green Party became town mayors, members of the high court, and even the president of a cantonal government (Verena Diener in 1999).

In 2007, the centrist wing of the party split away and formed the Green Liberal Party of Switzerland.

With the rise of right-wing and populist attitudes, the Greens continued to lose support in Switzerland. In the 2023 federal election, they came in fifth place.

== Policies ==
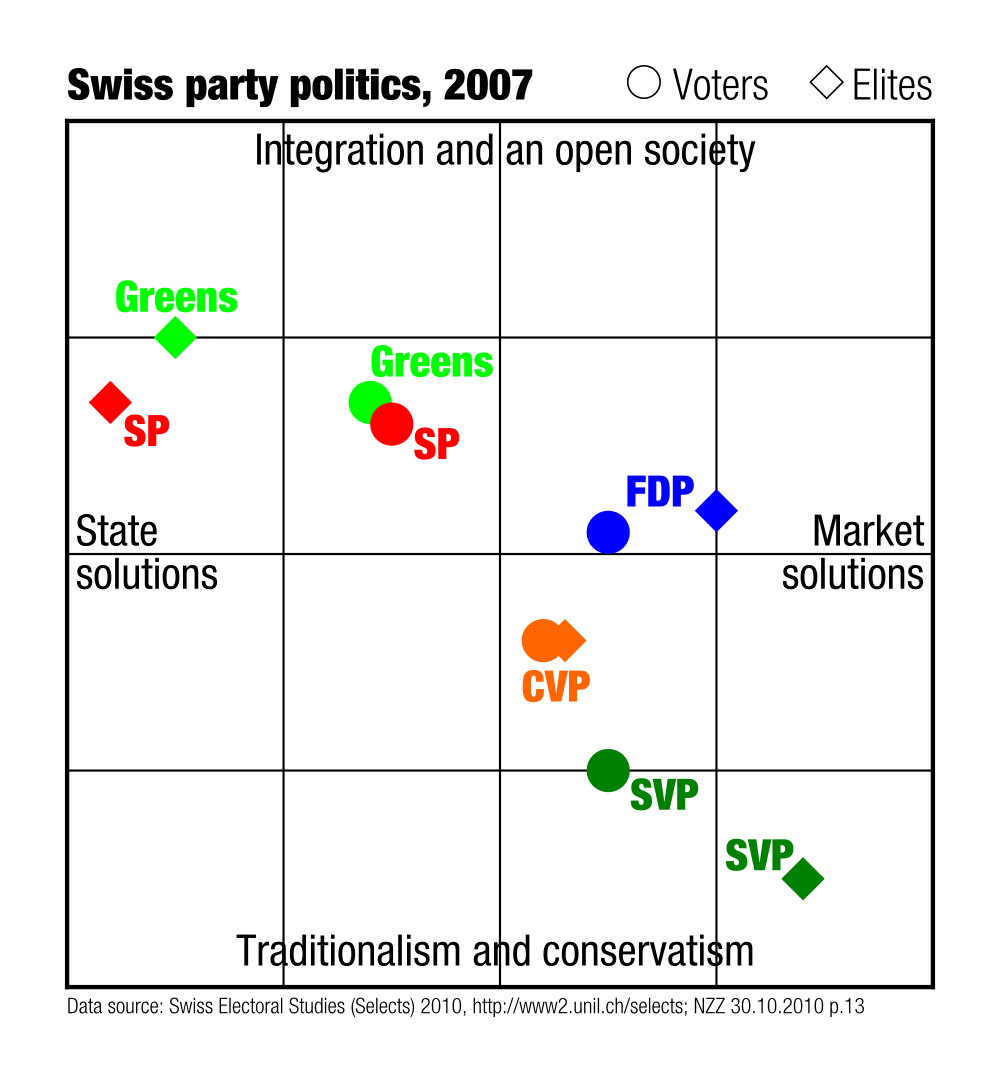
The Green Party's positions in the Swiss political spectrum (2007)

The party has been described as being left-wing. The traditional emphases of the party's policies lie in environmentalism and green transportation. In terms of foreign policy, the Greens set out on the course of openness and pacifism. In economic policy, the Greens are left-wing. The majority of Greens support an accession of Switzerland to the European Union. In immigration policy, the Greens support further integration initiatives for immigrants. The Greens also support measures to increase energy efficiency, oppose nuclear power, and support raising energy and fuel prices. According to their policies, the resulting revenues should be allocated to social security spending.

== Popular support ==
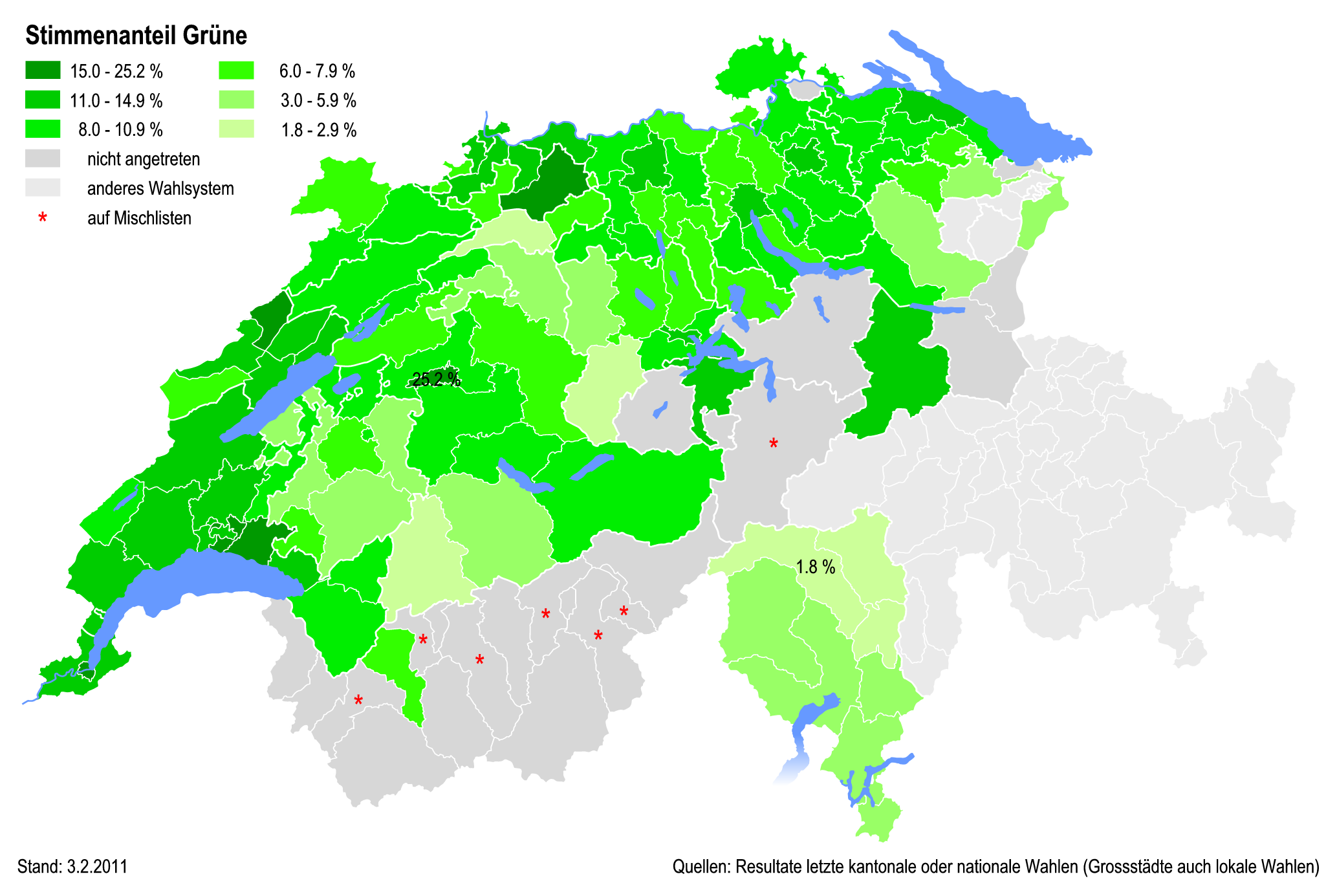
Percentages of the Green Party at district level in 2011

=== National Council and Council of States ===
Election year	# of overall votes	% of overall vote	# of National Council seats won	+/-	# of Council of States seats won	+/-	Notes
1979	11,583	0.6	1 / 200		0 / 46		
1983	37,079	1.9	3 / 200	▲2	0 / 46		
1987	94,378	4.9	9 / 200	▲6	0 / 46		
1991	124,149	6.1	14 / 200	▲5	0 / 46		
1995	96,069	5.0	8 / 200	▼6	0 / 46		
1999	96,807	5.0	8 / 200	0	0 / 46		
2003	156,226	7.4	13 / 200	▲5	0 / 46		
2007	222,206	9.6	20 / 200	▲7	2 / 46	▲2	
2011	205,984	8.4	15 / 200	▼5	2 / 46	0	
2015	177,938	7.1	11 / 200	▼4	1 / 46	▼1	
2019	319,988	13.2	28 / 200	▲17	5 / 46	▲4	
2023	249,891	9.78	23 / 200	▼5	3 / 46	▼2	

On the national level, in 2003 the Green Party was not represented in the Council of States or Federal Council. In 2007, two Green Party members were elected to the Council of States.

By 2005, the party held 3.8 per cent of the seats in the Swiss cantonal executive governments and 6.9 per cent in the Swiss cantonal parliaments (index "BADAC", weighted with the population and number of seats). In 2007, the Green Party was represented in the governments of the cantons Bern, Basel-City, Geneva (two ministers), Neuchâtel, Nidwalden, Vaud, Zug (two ministers) and Zurich.

== Party strength over time ==
Percentage of the total vote for the Green Party in Federal Elections 1971-2023
Canton	1971	1975	1979	1983	1987	1991	1995	1999	2003	2007	2011	2015	2019	2023
Switzerland	*	0.1	0.6	1.9	4.9	6.1	5.0	5.0	7.4	9.6	8.4	7.1	13.2	9.8
Zurich	*^{a}	*	1.3	4.2	8.0	7.0	6.5	4.1	8.5	10.4	8.4	6.9	14.1	9.9
Berne	*	*	*	*	9.2	9.9	5.9	7.5	9.3	12.9	9.4	8.5	13.6	10.8
Lucerne	*	*	*	*	*	9.3	8.1	8.0	9.8	9.5	8.3	7.1	12.2	8.1
Uri	*	*	*	*	*	*	*	*	30.6	*	*	26.3	*	*
Schwyz	*	*	*	*	*	*	*	*	*	3.4	3.8	1.4	2.6	2.7
Obwalden	*	*	*	*	*	*	*	*	*	*	*	*	*	*
Nidwalden	*	*	*	*	*	*	*	*	*	*	19.6	*	*	*
Glarus	*	*	*	*	*	*	*	*	*	*	*	*	2.7	*
Zug	*	*	*	*	*	*	*	*	*	17.0	15.4	7.2	19.2	16.2
Fribourg	*	*	*	*	4.2	*	2.3	*	4.0	6.3	5.0	5.3	12.5	11.8
Solothurn	*	*	*	*	*	7.3	5.8	4.9	6.0	10.0	7.5	5.6	11.4	9.3
Basel-Stadt	*	*	*	*	1.1	4.4	5.6	8.7	9.2	12.1	13.4	11.2	17.7	17.1
Basel-Landschaft	*	*	*	1.9	6.9	11.0	9.5	9.2	12.6	13.8	13.6	14.2	18.0	10.0
Schaffhausen	*	*	*	*	*	*	*	*	*	*	*	3.4	6.8	4.8
Appenzell A.Rh.	*	*	*	*	*	*	*	*	*	*	6.4	*	*	*
Appenzell I.Rh.	*	*	*	*	*	*	*	*	*	*	*	*	*	*
St. Gall	*	*	*	*	*	6.2	4.9	4.0	7.1	6.4	6.4	5.7	10.5	8.7
The Grisons	*	*	*	*	*	*	3.5	*	*	*	2.2	*	5.5	5.2
Aargau	*	*	*	*	*	6.8	5.3	4.4	5.1	8.1	7.3	5.5	9.8	7.1
Thurgau	*	*	*	5.9	10.8	9.0	9.3	6.2	7.9	10.2	7.0	5.4	10.6	8.5
Ticino	*	*	*	*	1.9	1.0	1.7	1.4	3.0	4.8	6.7	3.5	12.1	9.1
Vaud	*	1.0	6.4	7.0	8.4	6.3	4.1	7.1	11.3	14.3	11.6	11.3	19.7	13.5
Valais	*	*	*	*	1.7	1.3	1.3	2.1	2.6	3.9	5.0	4.9	10.6	8.4
Neuchâtel	*	*	*	7.4	7.1	8.0	5.9	14.7	13.8	9.4	11.7	9.3	20.8	16.5
Geneva	*	*	*	7.6	11.5	6.7	5.6	8.2	11.2	16.4	14.0	11.5	24.6	15.4
Jura	^{b}	^{b}	*	*	*	*	*	*	*	*	11.0	7.3	15.6	11.1

1.^a* indicates that the party was not on the ballot in this canton.
2.^bPart of the Canton of Bern until 1979.

== Party presidents ==
This is an incomplete list of the presidents of the Green Party since 1990:

- Irène Gardiol (1990–1992)
- Verena Diener (1992–1995)
- Hanspeter Thür (1995–1997)
- Ruedi Baumann (1997–2001)
- Patrice Mugny (co-president; 2001–2004)
- Ruth Genner (2001–2008; co-president until 2004)
- Ueli Leuenberger (2008–2012)
- Adèle Thorens Goumaz (co-president; 2012–2016)
- Regula Rytz (2012–2020; co-president until 2016)
- Balthasar Glättli (2020–2024)
- Lisa Mazzone (since 2024)

== Affiliates ==
- Alternative – die Grünen Zug

== See also ==
- Green party
- Green politics
- Environmental movement in Switzerland
- List of environmental organizations
