= Marianne Ehrmann =

Swiss & German novelist and publicist, editor

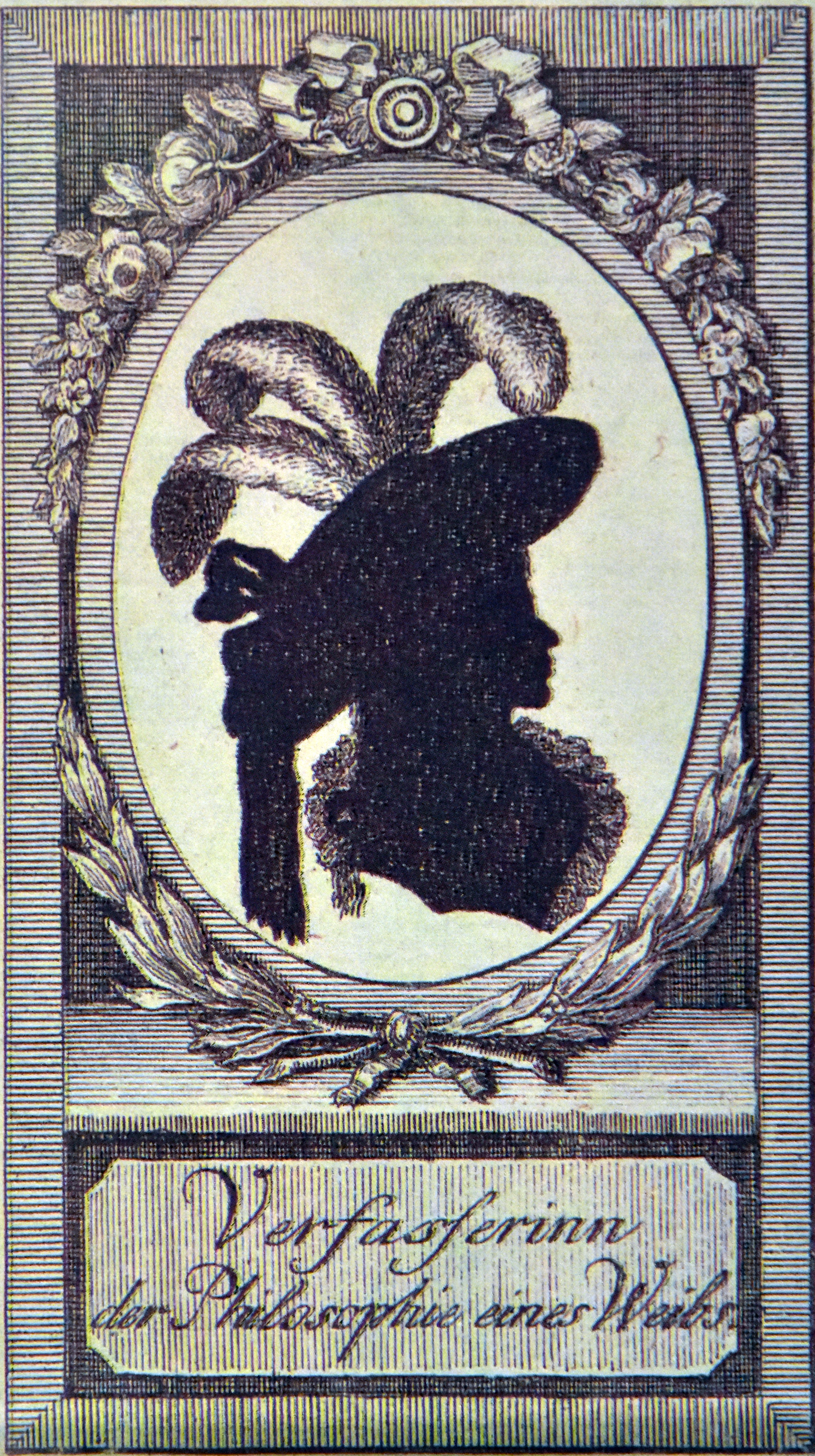
- "Verfasserin der, Philosophie eines Weibs", paper cutting by an unknown artist, being the only known portrait of Marianne Ehrmann.
- Born: 25 November 1755; Rapperswil
- Died: 14 August 1795 (aged 39); Stuttgart
- Other names: Marianne Ehrmann-Brentano; Madame Sternheim; Maria Anna Antonia Sternheim
- Occupations: journalist, novelist and publicist
- Years active: 1780–1795

Marianne Ehrmann (née: Marianne Brentano-Corti, also Marianne Ehrmann-Brentano and Madame Sternheim; 25 November 1755 – 14 August 1795) was one of the first women novelists, publicists and journalists in the German-speaking countries.

== Life and career ==
=== Early life ===
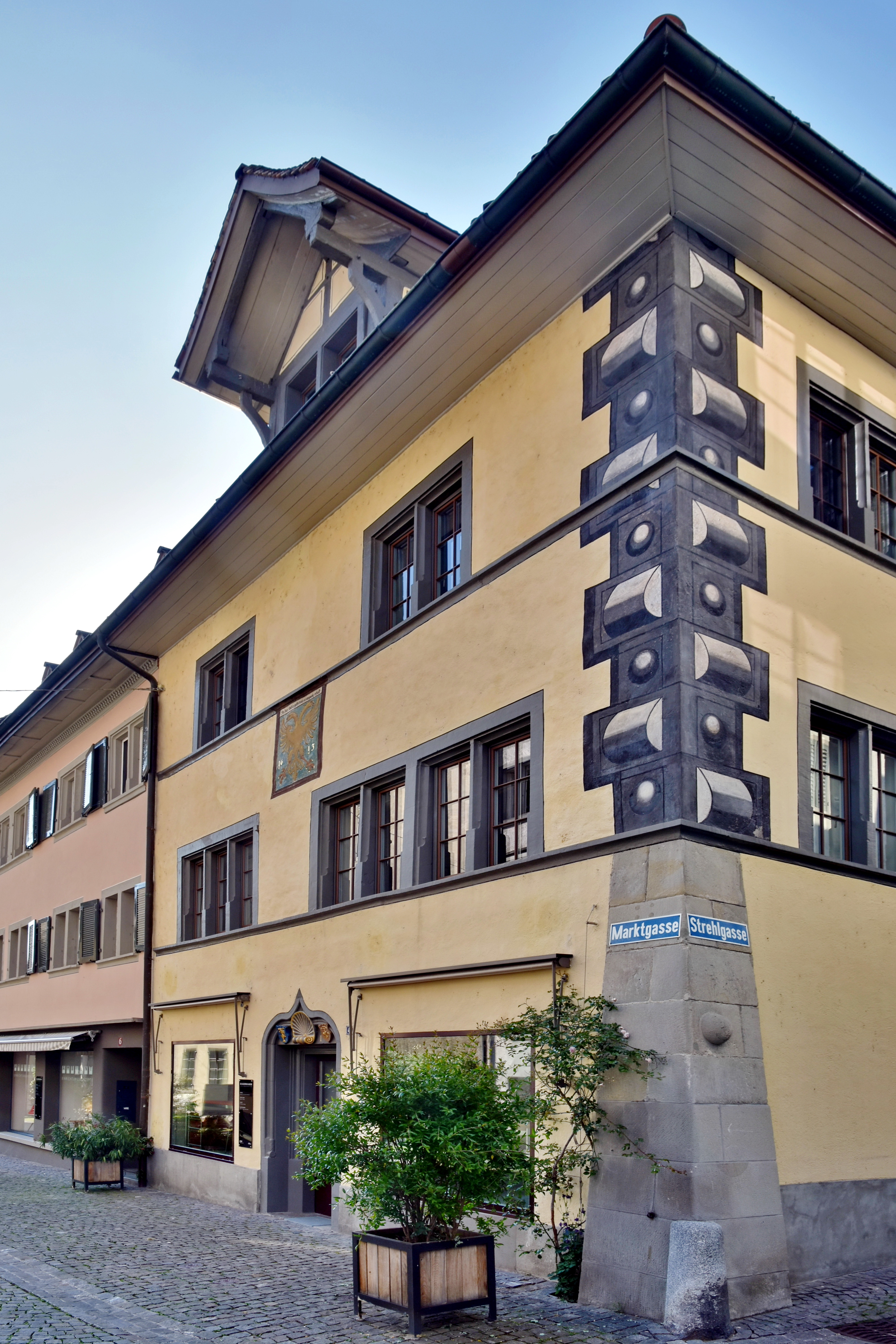
Haus zum Goldenen Adler where Marianne Ehrmann-Brentano was born, Marktgasse in Rapperswil

Born in Rapperswil in the canton of St. Gallen in Switzerland, Marianne was the daughter of Sebastiana Antonia Corti (Curti) and the merchant Franz Xaver Brentano. She had nine siblings; her mother died on 22 April 1770. Around 1772/73 Franz Xaver Brentano moved with his children to Wurzach in southern Germany. In 1775 her father died, as did her only surviving sister a little later. Marianne Brentano moved to her uncle Dominic von Brentano, who was a priest and chaplain at the Imperial Abbey of Kempten. He supported the young woman in the following years, when Marianne Brentano worked as a governess in aristocratic houses.

=== Learning years ===
Around 1777 Marianne Brentano married an officer of unknown name, but she got divorced in 1779, after he gambled away the money and was violent; she may have had a miscarriage caused by his ill-treatment of her. He became indebted, stole money and fled to escape punishment. Marianne was financially, physically and psychologically ruined after two years of marriage, fell into insanity and was confined for months. With the help of her uncle, she recovered. About three years later, she went to Vienna, where she unsuccessfully worked as a governess, and then joined a troupe of actors. Under the name Madame Sternheim she worked a number of years on the stage.

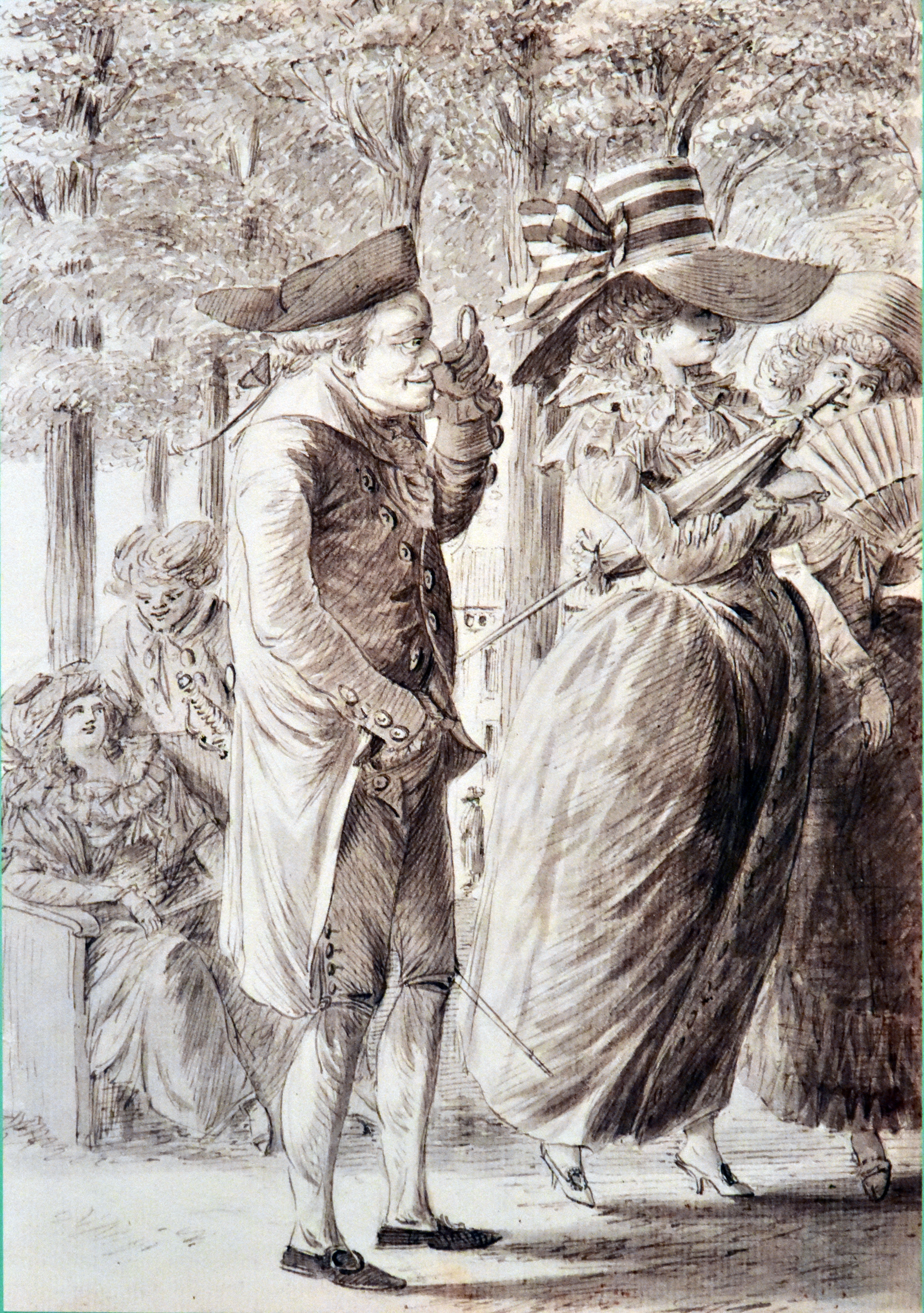
Theatergruppe Koberwein in Bern, drawing by Johann Jakob Lutz.

With various theater companies, among them with the group of Simon Friedrich Koberwein in Strasbourg, Marianne Brentano toured Austria, France, Germany, Holland, Switzerland, and even Hungary and Transylvania.

Her first tracts, Müssige Stunden eines Frauenzimmers (literally: Leisure Hours of a Lady) (By an Observer) and Philosophie eines Weibes, von einer Beobachterin (Philosophy of a Woman, by a woman observer), were published anonymously; the latter caused quite a stir. During a stay of the troupe in Strasbourg, the author met the junior postdoctoral lawyer Theophil Friedrich Ehrmann. In 1785, facing the resistance of his parents, they married in secret; her seven years younger husband continued to live with his parents and they met only in the evening until 1786, when reconciliation with Theophil Ehrmann's parents occurred. Also in 1786, under the pseudonym Maria Anna Antonia Sternheim, Marianne Ehrmann published the play Leichtsinn und gutes Herz oder die Folgen der Erziehung, (Frivolity and a Good Heart, or The Consequences of Education). Duke Charles of Württemberg and his wife Franziska promised Theophil Friedrich Ehrmann a position as professor in the Charles School, but in 1788, when the duke broke his word, the Ehrmanns moved to Stuttgart. Marianne Ehrmann became the co-editor of the journal Der Beobachter (Observer) that was published by her husband.

=== Journalist, publisher and novelist ===
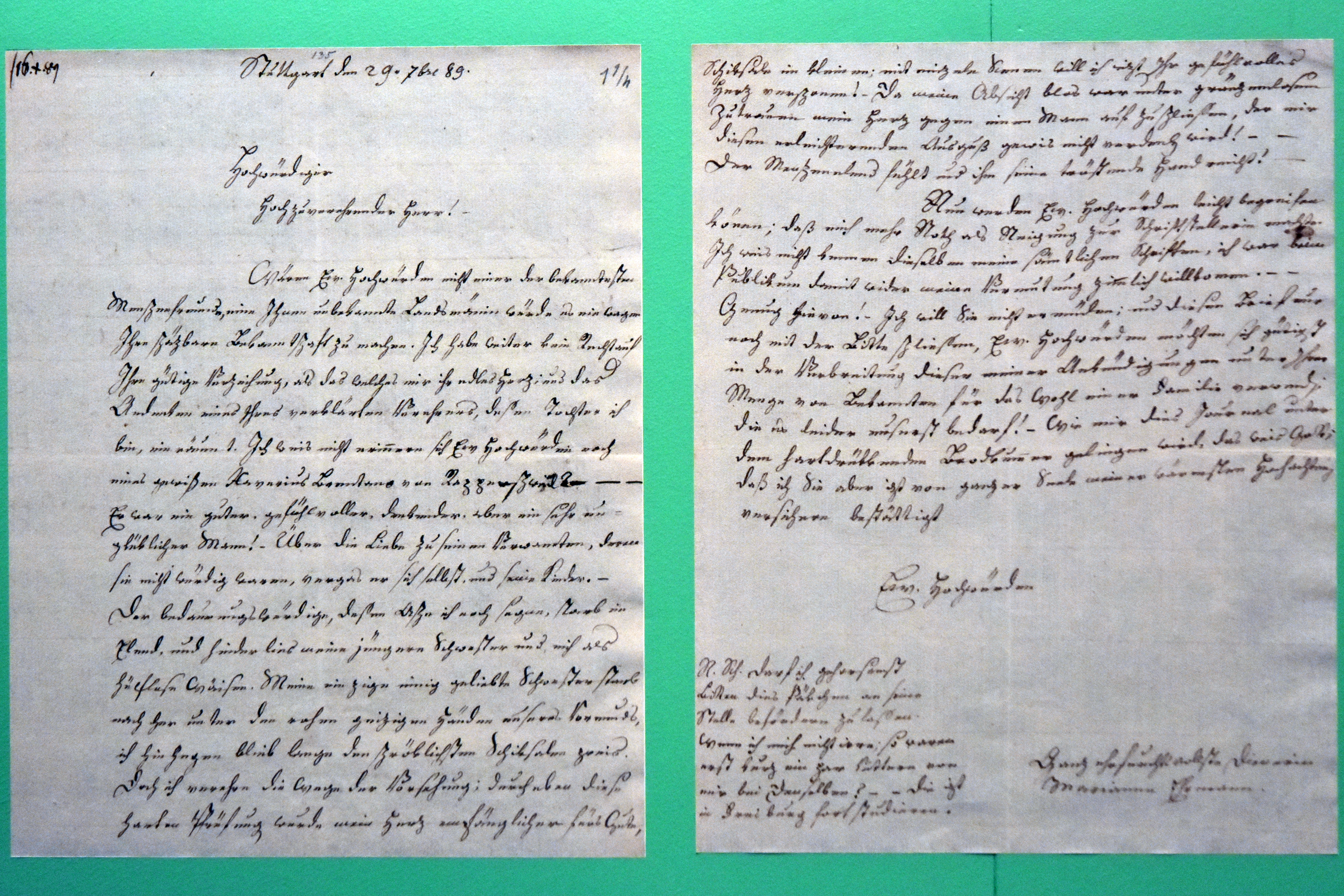
Letter written by Marianne Ehrmann on 29 September 1789 to J. C. Lavater in Zürich to support her publications.

Marianne Ehrmann became one of the first women journalists and publicists in the German speaking countries. After the literary success, in 1784, of the essay Philosophie eines Weibs, in 1788 she wrote the autobiographical epistolary novel Amalie: Eine wahre Geschichte in Briefen (literally: Amalie: a true story in letters). Beginning in 1787, she wrote for the Frauen-Zeitung newspaper which was published by her husband, and composed the epistolary novel Amalie and Minna. She also worked on the weekly Der Beobachter, published by her husband since August 1788. From 1790 to 1792 she issued a ground-breaking monthly magazine for women, Amaliens Erholungsstunden (literally: Amalie's holiday hours).

=== Amaliens Erholungsstunden ===
Amaliens Erholungsstunden was initially self-published monthly by Marianne Ehrmann under her own name. She sent advance notices to acquaintances, friends and potential patrons to distribute, and the first six editions resulted in an increase of subscribers. The debts contracted by the self-publishing were indeed paid off, but in all a financial disaster ensued, which is why in January 1791 Marianne and her husband started a cooperation with the publisher Johann Friedrich Cotta at his publishing house J. G. Cottaische Verlagsbuchhandlung in Tübingen. Marianne Ehrmann hoped to concentrate on the journalistic work. Indeed, the magazine was very successful; the circulation of around 1,000 copies was relatively high for a journal focussed on women's issues. It addressed readers from the upper middle class to support the social situation of women and to urge readers to express their own opinions. During the second year, probably caused by censorship and by the publisher, much of the content became trivial, and Marianne and Theophil Ehrmann's contributions were partially replaced by third party contributions. In the third year, contradicting Marianne Ehrmann's wishes, the magazine became much more commercial and trivial and more adapted by the publisher to prevailing social values. With that, the Ehrmanns quit, whereupon Cotta, using the Ehrmanns' subscriber base, published the magazine under the new name Flora. Marianne Ehrmann initiated a new magazine, Einsiedlerinn aus den Alpen (literally: The woman hermit in the Alps), with contributions again mostly written by herself.

=== Einsiedlerinn aus den Alpen ===
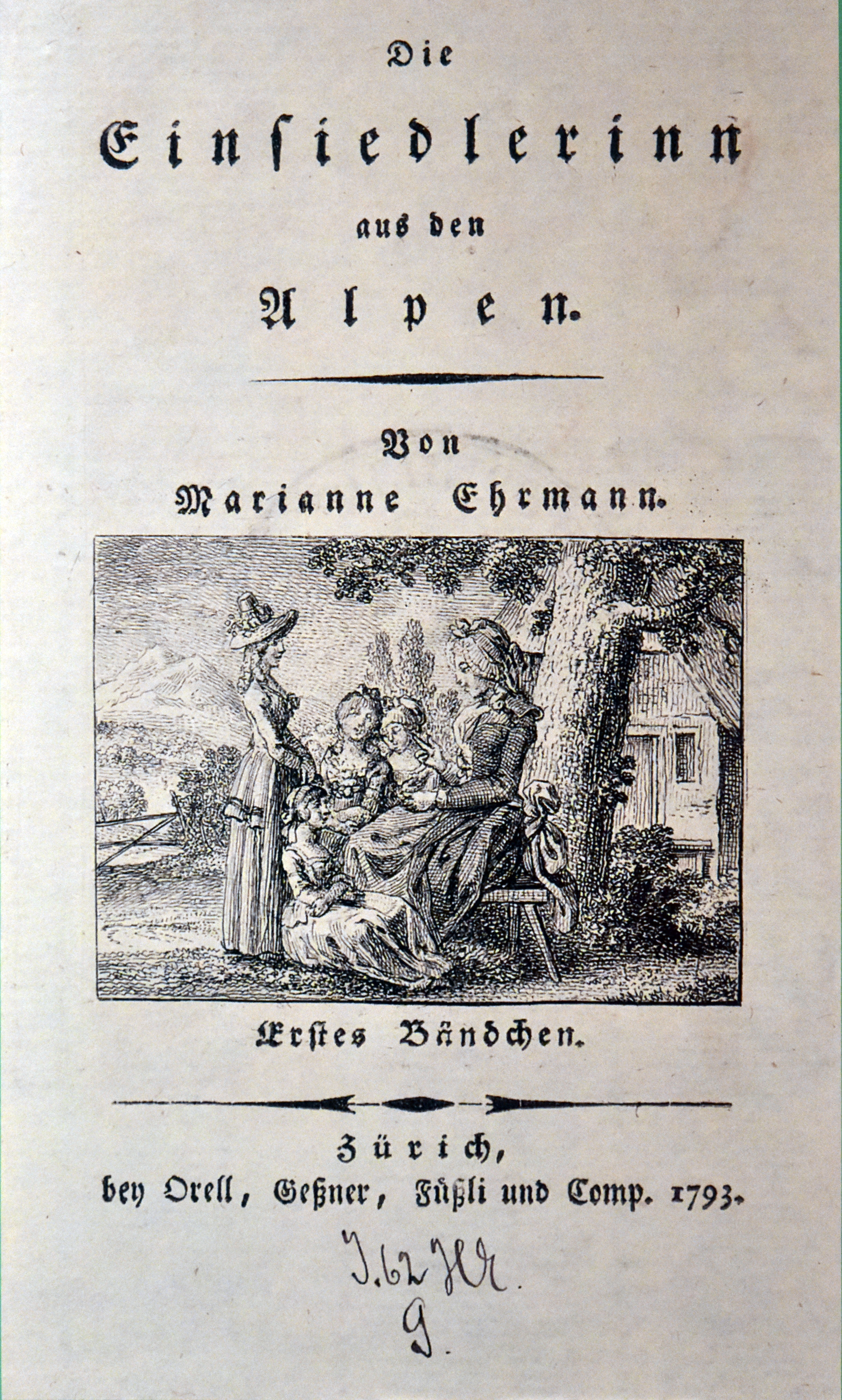
Cover of Einsiedlerin aus den Alpen, first volume, published in Zürich in 1793.

In spring 1792 the publishing house Orell, Gessner, Füssli & Cie in Zürich enabled Marianne Ehrmann to continue her work as a publicist. Beginning in December 1792 the first issue of Einsiedlerinn aus den Alpen appeared, the first magazine that was edited in Switzerland by a woman. Marianne Ehrmann had to recruit new readers, and the couple informed their previous subscribers about their new magazine. The start of the cooperation with the publishing house improved the business position of Marianne Ehrmann. When there were problems between her husband and the publisher, the publisher wanted to announce the collaboration, but out of respect to Marianne Ehrmann she could continue to draw up the magazine. Einsiedlerinn aus den Alpen largely corresponded to the first edition of her first magazine, to publish true stories and serialized novels. Theophil Ehrmann only wrote a few posts, but took over the correction of the articles. Marianne Ehrmann sought their employees herself, among them David Friedrich Gräter who became a close friend, Friederike Brun and Gottlieb Konrad Pfeffel. Editing was solely in the hands of Marianne Ehrmann, but her disease delayed the publication, so that the first two volumes comprised 70% foreign contributions, and were delayed. In early June 1795 the last issue was completed and Marianne Ehrmann, plagued by her years of disease, decided to stop the contribution of the journal.

== Death and aftermath ==
On 14 August 1795 Marianne Ehrmann Brentano died in Stuttgart at the age of 39 years of pneumonia. Her posthumous writings Amaliens Feierstunden (literally: Amalie's celebration hours) were published in 1796. Marianne Ehrmann's visionary dream of an individual female independence and her hope to establish an ongoing progressive female publication were not realized within the next hundred years, but she was regarded by contemporary people as a philosopher of the Age of Enlightenment.

== Work (excerpt) ==
- 1784: Philosophie eines Weibs: Von einer Beobachterin. Im Jahr 1784.
- 1786: Leichtsinn und gutes Herz oder die Folgen der Erziehung. Ein Original-Schauspiel in fünf Aufzügen. (play, written as Madame Sternheim)
- 1787: Amalie and Minna (novel)
- 1788: Amalie: Eine wahre Geschichte in Briefen (novel)
- 1790–1792: Amaliens Erholungsstunden (monthly women's magazine)
- 1793–1794: Die Einsiedlerinn aus den Alpen (women's magazine)
- 1796: Amaliens Feierstunden (posthumous work)
- Ein Weib ein Wort. Kleine Fragmente für Denkerinnen. Published by Maya Widmer and Doris Stump. Kore, Freiburg (i. Brsg.) 1994, ISBN 3-926023-51-1.
- Amalie. Eine wahre Geschichte in Briefen. Published by Maya Widmer and Doris Stump, in: Schweizer Texte, Volume 6. Chronos Verlag, Zürich 1995, ISBN 3-0340-0820-1.
- Die Einsiedlerinn aus den Alpen. Published by Annette Zunzer, in: Schweizer Texte, Volume 15. Chronos Verlag, Zürich 2001, ISBN 3-0340-0827-9.
- Nina's Briefe an ihren Geliebten. Zenodot, 2007, ISBN 978-3-86640-129-7.

== Literature ==
- Sophie Forst: “Marianne Ehrmann (1755–1795)”. In: Feministische Aufklärung in Europa. The Feminist Enlightenment across Europe. Interdisziplinäres Jahrbuch zur Erforschung des 18. Jahrhunderts und seiner Wirkungsgeschichte. Edited by Isabel Karremann and Gideon Stiening. Hamburg: Felix Meiner Verlag 2020, pp. 312–323. (https://meiner-elibrary.de/aufklarung-band-32-feministische-aufklarung-in-europa-the-feminist-enlightenment-across-europe.html).
- Mary Helen Dupree: The Mask and the Quill. Actress-Writers in Germany from Enlightenment to Romanticism. Bucknell University Press, Bucknell PA 2011, ISBN 9781611480245.
- Ruth P. Dawson: “'And This Shield is called—Self-Reliance,' Emerging Feminist Consciousness in the Late Eighteenth Century.“ In: German Women in the Eighteenth and Nineteenth Centuries: A Social and Literary History, ed. Ruth-Ellen B. Joeres and Mary Jo Maynes. Bloomington: Indiana Univ. Press, 1986. 157–74.
- Ruth P. Dawson: "Confronting the Lords of Creation: Marianne Ehrmann (1755–95). The Contested Quill: Literature by Women in Germany 1770–1880. Newark, Del.: University of Delaware, 2002. 221–285. ISBN 978-0874137620.
- Annette Zunzer: Marianne Ehrmann: Die Einsiedlerinn aus den Alpen. Paul Haupt Verlag, Bern 2002, ISBN 9783258063447.
- Anne Fleig: Handlungs-Spiel-Räume: Dramen von Autorinnen im Theater des ausgehenden 18. Jahrhunderts. Königshausen und Neumann, Würzburg 1999, ISBN 3-8260-1525-8.
- Helga Stipa Madland: Marianne Ehrmann: Reason and Emotion in her Life and Works. Women in German Literature. (Women in German Literature; vol. 1) Peter Lang, New York 1998, ISBN 978-0820439297.
- Alois Stadler: "Die Familie Brentano und die Stadt Rapperswil." In: Seepresse Bezirk See und Gaster, Rapperswil 1996.
- Gottfried August Bürger, Theophil Friedrich Ehrmann: Briefe an Marianne Ehrmann: Ein merkwürdiger Beitrag zur Geschichte der letzten Lebensjahre des Dichters. Industrie-Comptoir, 1802.

== See also ==
- List of women printers and publishers before 1800
