= LGBTQ history in Switzerland =

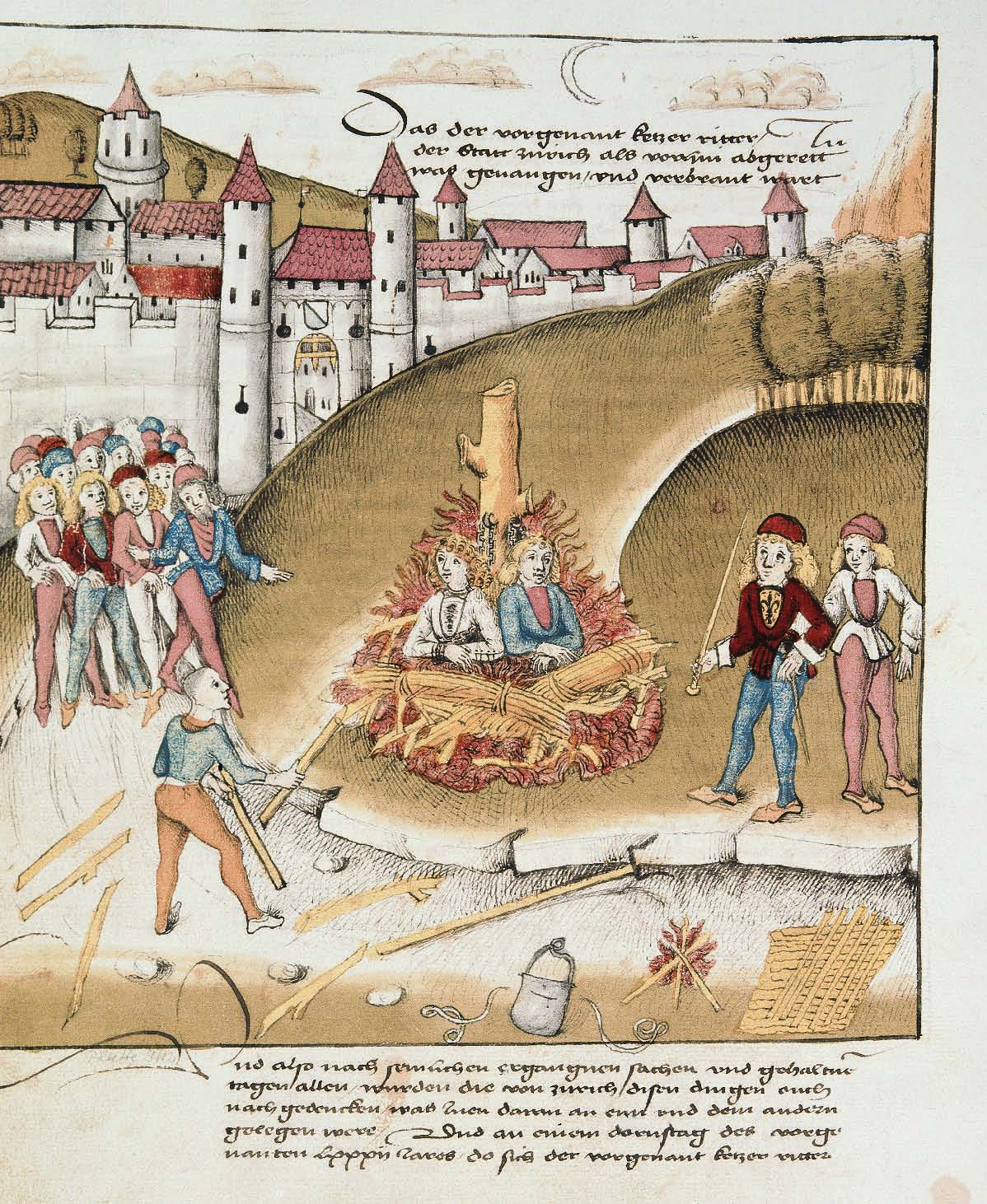
Burning of the Swiss noble Richard Puller von Hohenburg, accused of being a sodomite, in Zürich, 1482

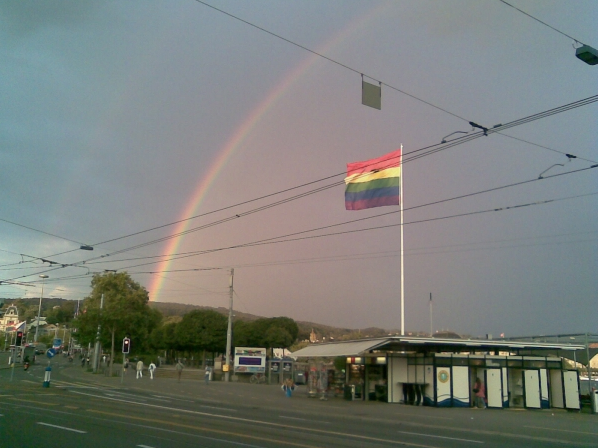
Europride flag, Buerkliplatz, Zurich, Switzerland, 2009

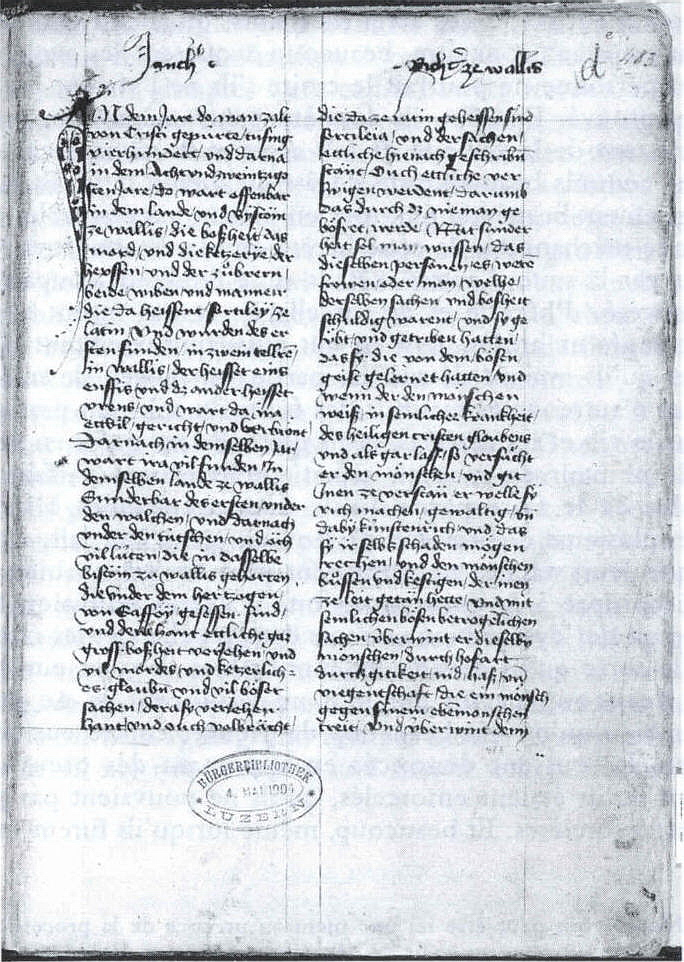
Hans Fründ - witch persecution in the canton of Valais

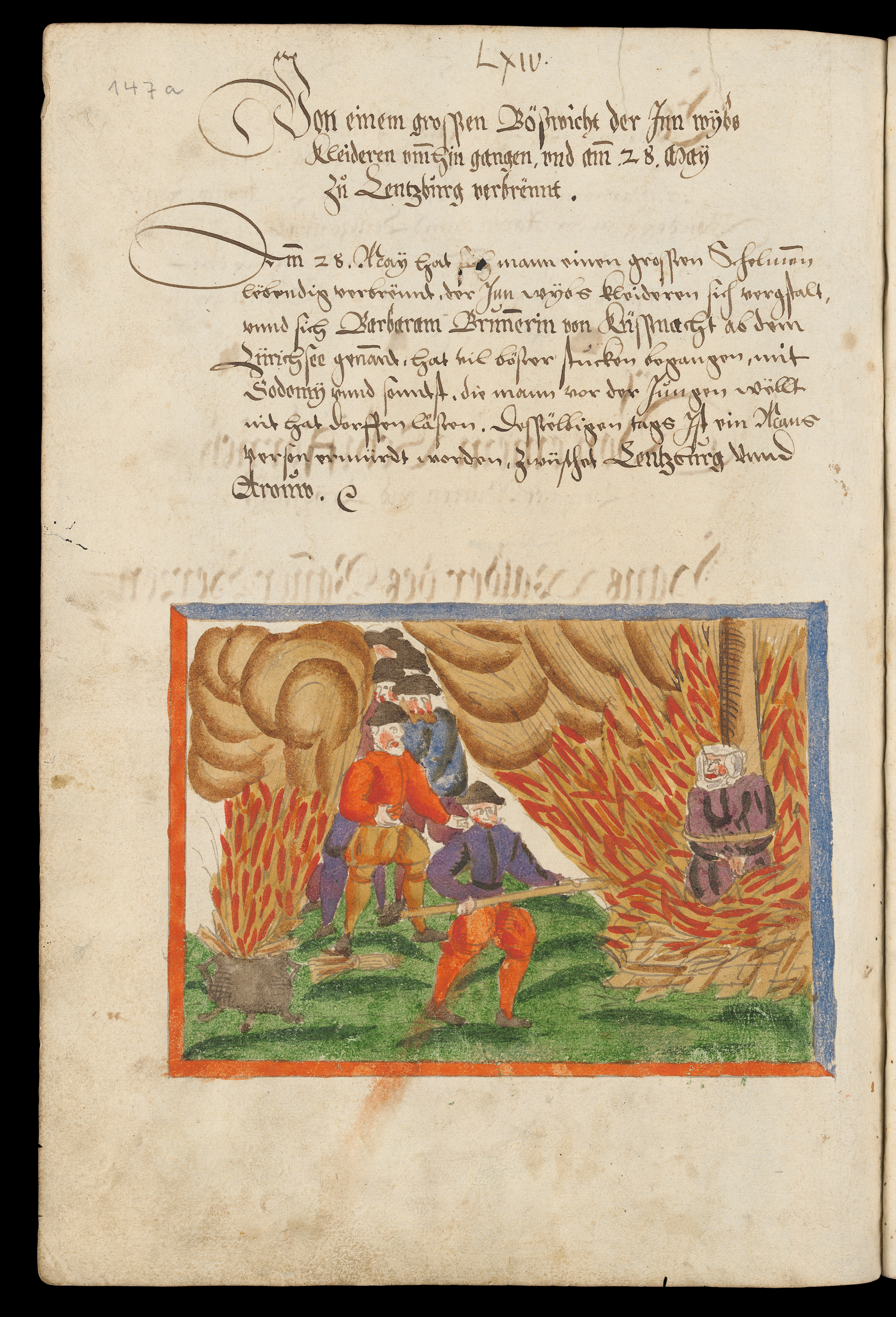
In 1586 in Lenzburg, Barbara Brunner was burned, as she was discovered to be male under her clothes.

Switzerland has a long history regarding the movement of equality for lesbian, gay, bisexual and transgender citizens. Prior to the 20th century, sodomy and other types of sexual intercourse between people of the same sex was held in various levels of legal contempt. Today, the modern LGBT rights movement in Switzerland is related to the larger international movement which developed largely after 1969.

== Pre-modern history ==
With the Christianization of Switzerland from the 3rd century AD, sodomy (anal intercourse), and especially homosexuality, were seen as two of many sins. The first ever unequivocal legal basis for the punishment of homosexuality in Switzerland is the Constitutio Criminalis Carolina, variations of which were introduced in many cantons of the Confederation by 1532. Even before that, in the 13th century, criminal prosecution and execution of men accused of practising the "sodomite vice" and penalties for sodomy increased significantly in Europe. Between 1400 and 1798 in the Canton of Zürich alone, out of a total of 1,424 death sentences, 179 were given after sodomy allegations, making it the third most common offence punished by the death sentence after theft and homicide. Even so, the number of people condemned to death for homosexual acts in the Swiss Confederation was relatively low compared to that in Italian cities in the fifteenth century.

In the German-speaking cantons of the Confederation, homosexuality was considered a "Gallic" sin. Men who were convicted of sodomy often admitted to have taken to French-or Italian-speaking countries to practise their homosexual behaviour. Conversely, abroad the Swiss were often reviled and, insulted as a people who had sex with cows, as a play on their rural origins. (Note: in modern Germa, "Sodomie" refers to bestiality, whereas in contrast, in the Middle Ages the term was used to refer to very different practises which were seen as "unnatural" at that time, mainly anal intercourse, so care must be taken in translation.) At the time of the Reformation, Catholics were often referred to as homosexuals, while those in favour of the Reformation were insulted in turn as "Kuhgeiger" ("cowfuckers").

As in other parts of Europe, most homosexual acts performed in the Confederation were pederastic (inter-generational). In court, it was more important what age the participants were rather than who had penetrated, in contrast to cities in southern Europe. Children and young people could escape a punishment. In 1416 in Basel, the Dominican Heinrich von Rheinfelden was protected from prosecution by the Grand Council by his order, despite evidence of homosexual acts.

The number of people who were sentenced to death for sodomy was very dependent on the will of the holder of the judiciary to uncover and prosecute such offenses. Thus, during the term of office of Hans Conrad Heidegger (1649–1721) as the provincial governor of Kyburg County between 1694 and 1698, 22 young people were executed for sodomy. When Heidegger moved on to the Upper Vogt of Höngg, this series ended. In the surviving court records, there is a documented linguistic distinction between the sodomy offences, where sodomia was used for homosexual acts and intercourse with animals was referred to as bestialitas.

== 19th century ==
=== Helvetic ===
In the Helvetic Republic (1798–1803), marked by the values of the French Revolution, homosexuality was not prosecuted. With the end of the Helvetic Republic, homosexuality was made an official offence in most Cantons, and penalised with up to several years of imprisonment.

=== "Liberal champion" ===
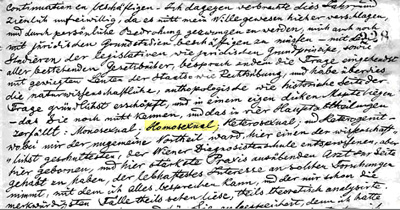
First mention of "homosexual" and "heterosexual" in a letter of the Austro-Hungarian writer by Karl Heinrich Ulrichs in 1868

The history of LGBT emancipation began in 1836, with the publication of a book by Heinrich Hössli, a cloth merchant from Glarus, defending homosexuality and love between men. In his two-volume work, «Eros. Die Männerliebe der Griechen» (Eros. The male love of the Greeks) (published in Glarus in 1836 and in St. Gallen in 1838) he presented, from the idea of liberalism, the demand that the recognition of homosexuality was a test of liberal democracy and civil rights. In the German-speaking world outside Switzerland during the mid-19th century, two liberal champions of gay rights made their ideas public. Johann Jakob Bachofen wrote about lesbianism and pederasty in Das Mutterrecht in 1861. His focus being on a connection between female homosexuality in Sappho and the island of Lesbos.

Karl Heinrich Ulrichs in the Kingdom of Hanover gave the name "Uranism" to the concept of same-sex love in 1864, followed in 1868 by Karl Maria Kertbeny from Austria-Hungary, who first called it "homosexuality."

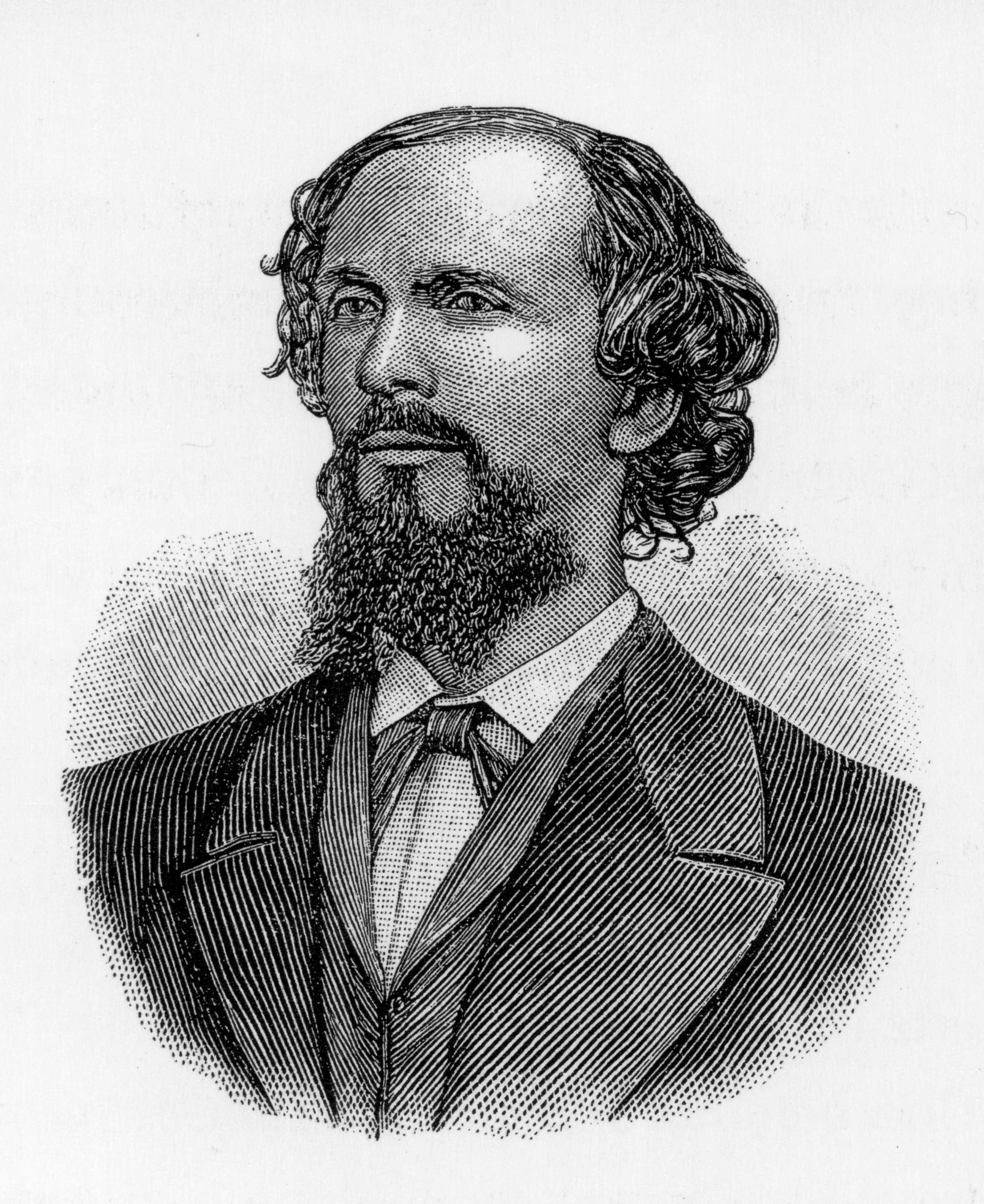
Karl Heinrich Ulrichs

In the 1880s and 1890s, Jakob Rudolf Forster from Brunnadern SG (1853–1926) was prosecuted by the St. Gallen authorities for his open homosexuality. In 1893, he presented the Federal Assembly with a petition for the Elimination of Discrimination Against Homosexuals («Beseitigung der Diskriminierung der Homosexuellen»). Karl Heinrich Ulrichs submitted an application for pardoning Forster to the St. Gallen authorities, but was turned away.

== 20th century ==
From the beginning of the 20th century, increasing numbers of cantons no longer treated sodomy as an official offence, and pursued charges only on request. For a conviction, the offence had to be proved through witness statements, leading to a drastic decline in the number of convictions. The usage of the term sodomy also changed.

=== 1930s: The scene arises ===
In the 1930s, dance clubs were created in Basel and Zürich. When the Nazis rose to power in Germany, Berlin's reputation across Europe as the most liberal and attractive city for LGBT people changed abruptly. Police in several Swiss cities began to create registers of homosexuals, to which they added people in raids on meeting places. In Zürich in 1931, some women founded the Damen-Club Amicitia (Amicitia Ladies Club). Soon, men were allowed to join too, and in 1932 the club started publishing a magazine called Freundschafts-Banner ("Friendship Banner"), whose name was changed in 1933 to the Schweizerisches Freundschafts-Banner ("Swiss Friendship Banner") and in 1937 to Menschenrecht ("Human Rights"). It repeatedly called on its readers to act against slander in the press and work for the decriminalization of homosexuality.

=== 1940s: Exemption from punishment and retreat ===
In 1942, during the Second World War, the first Swiss penal code came into force after 24 years of preparation. Article 194 only penalised acts with "underaged persons of the same sex older than sixteen years". Since the age of majority was 21 in Switzerland at the time, in effect this meant that same-sex sexual acts between adults aged 21 and older were legalised. However, Article 191 legalised different-sex acts from the age of 16 and older, thus leading to a discriminatory, unequal age of consent.

Due to the Nazi occupation in Europe and the new freedom in Switzerland, Zurich rose in importance as a European gay capital.

With the decriminalization of homosexuality, the combative tone of the magazine Human Rights began to soften. In 1942, the new editor Karl Meier renamed the magazine Der Kreis/Le Cercle ("The Circle"), and turned it into a culture magazine, now only targeted to gay men. His Der Kreis club organised parties several times a year. Both the bi-monthly magazine and the parties were known throughout Europe.

=== 1950s: Adapted and hidden ===
Karl Meier believed that it would take years for society to call for legal recognition of LGBT people, and that LGBT people could only achieve this by living in an adjusted and normal fashion. The Circle was the first magazine to feature edifying texts in German, French and English, and artistic photos of men. Members and subscribers referred to each other using pseudonyms rather than their real names.

Nevertheless, the Der Kreis club, being one of the first LGBT civil rights movements and groups founded in Europe, influenced and even inspired the formation and development of similar movements throughout Europe by the time of the Second World War. Examples are Die Runde (The Round) camaraderie in Reutlingen, Germany, the Journal Arcadie in France, the Cultuur- en Ontspannings Centrum in the Netherlands, Kredsen af 1948 in Denmark, and the Mattachine Society in the United States of America.

=== 1960s: The end of the Ice Age ===
In 1960, the Der Kreis club was wound up. This occurred after a series of murders of gay men brought the attention of the Zürich press, who published their address. Major events were no longer possible, and the climate was more liberal in some European countries, causing subscribers to fall away. The last issue of Der Kreis appeared at the end of 1967, whereupon young men from sources close to Der Kreis immediately founded the new Journal Club 68, which was renamed hey ab in 1970. The topic of homosexuality was first mentioned by Swiss Television, under the theme of "youth protection", in programmes broadcast in January and February 1967. The Swiss Organization of Homophiles (SOH) was founded in this environment in 1970. The SOH was the first gay umbrella organization, and was regarded as rather conservative, and "adjusted". Above all, it could not reach left-wing gays and gay students. The period of history between the founding of the Freundschafts-Banner in 1932 and the SOH is known as the first LGBT movement.

=== 1970s: Second, radical LGBT movement ===
Since the 1970s, a second gay and lesbian civil rights movement has formed, which has led to many forms of discrimination against LGBT people being abolished (for example, equalising the age of consent, Registered Partnership, elimination of different tax laws for homosexual and heterosexual members of the army).

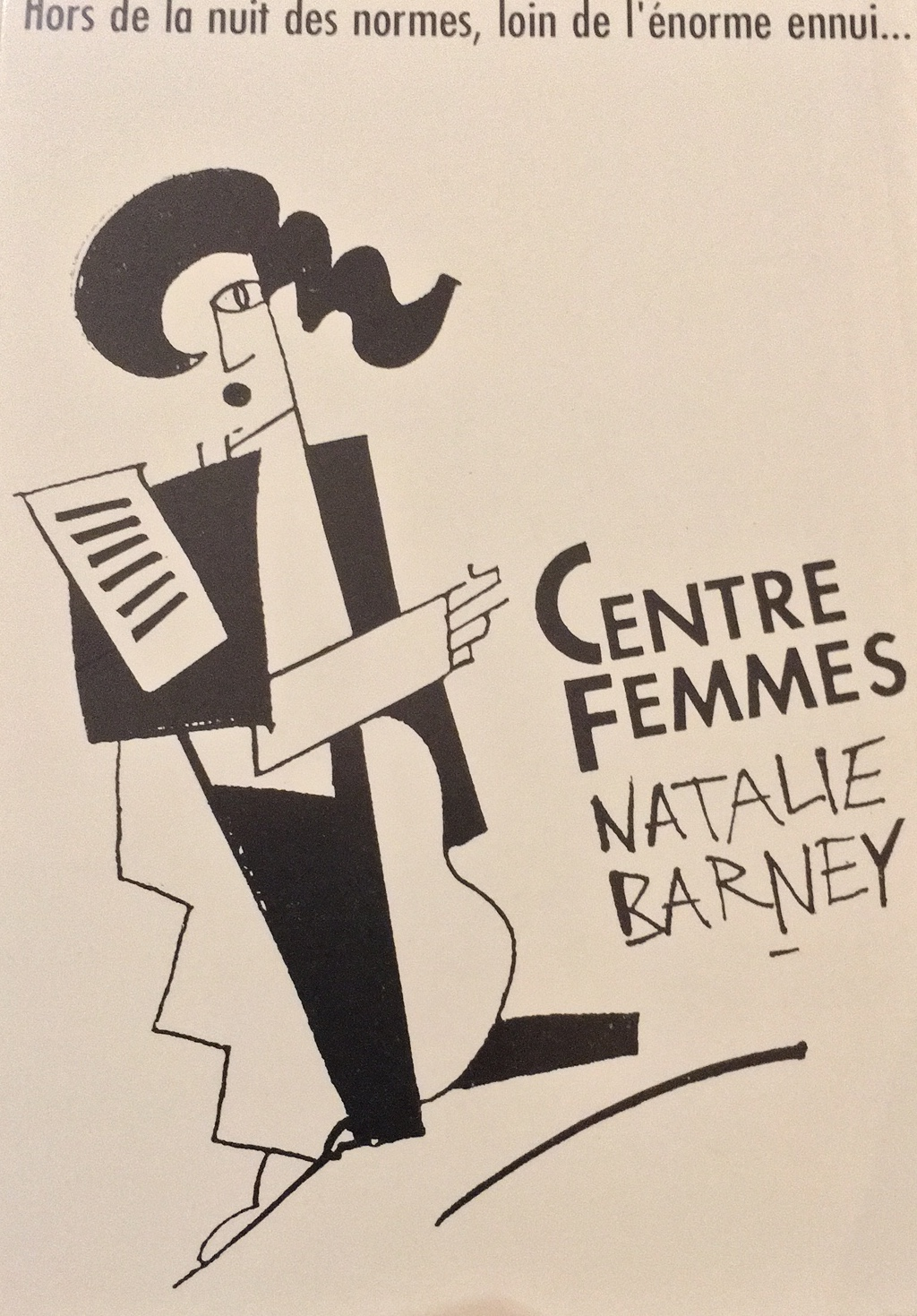
Nathalie Barney Center logo by Christiane Parth

In the early 1970s, the first news about the Stonewall riots by American LGBT people against police brutality filtered through to Europe. This particularly inspired and mobilised young, left-wing LGBT people. In 1970, Rosa von Praunheim showed his film «Nicht der Homosexuelle ist pervers, sondern die Situation, in der er lebt» (It's not the Homosexual who is perverse, but the situation in which he lives) at the universities of Zürich, Basel and Bern. Following the screenings, the LGBT groups in Zürich (HAZ), Basel (initially called HAB, then HABS) and Bern (HAB) were established. Politically, the HA groups were close to the Marxist–Leninist PO-groups.

In 1973 in Zürich, men in the leather subculture joined together to form the group Loge70. In 1974, the HA groups founded their first national governing body, the Homosexuellen Arbeitsgruppen Schweiz (HACH) (Homosexual Working Groups of Switzerland). There were a variety of groups and offerings on the commercial scene. The social climate changed significantly in favour of LGBT people. Large employers made rules stating that employees can no longer be dismissed because of their homosexuality. However, the police still maintained their register of LGBT people.

In 1975, gays marched with a banner on the 1 May (May Day) rally in Basel, the first time LGBT people had drawn attention to their concerns to the wider public. Part of the political left was very irritated by the participation of homosexuals.

=== 24 June 1978: The first Christopher Street Day (CSD) in Switzerland ===
The ‘Homosexuellen Arbeitsgruppen Schweiz’’ (HACH) (‘’Gay Working Groups of Switzerland’’), the ‘’Schweizer Organisation der Homophilen’’ (SOH) (Swiss Organization of Homophiles) and the ‘’Homosexuelle Frauengruppe’’ (HFG) (Gay Women's Group) organized the first ‘’Christopher-Street-Liberation-Memorial Day’’ (CSD) in Switzerland at the Zürich Platzspitz to commemorate the Stonewall riots. Christopher Street Day is the name for LGBT Pride parades in Germany and Switzerland (they are called Rainbow Parades in Austria). It started by collecting 5,500 signatures to call for the total abolition of the police register of homosexuals. This was accompanied by calls for the abolition of the register in the press, which together forced the destruction of the files.

From 1979 to 1982, annual national CSD LGBT pride rallies were organised. They were marked by a massive police presence due to fears of possible riots caused by the youth unrest at the time, but there was no rioting. In 1979, the ‘’Nationale Schwulendemo’’ (‘’National Gay Demo’’) was held in Bern. In 1980, Basel held ‘’Gay 80’’, followed by CSDs in Lausanne (1981) and Zurich (1982).

For the time, the demonstrators used radical, almost revolutionary slogans. In addition to specific demands such as lifting the gay registry and the elimination of discrimination in the criminal justice system, the demonstrators demanded an end to heteronormativity and consciously defined themselves as anti-bourgeois. Some wanted to fight against any State discrimination, not just against LGBT people. Unlike today, the demonstrations had an almost exclusively political character, and were followed in the evenings not by partying but by political discussion.

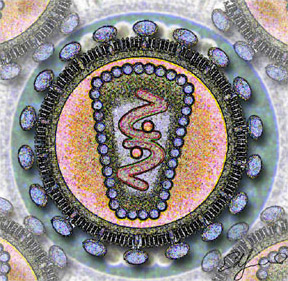
Human Immunodeficency Virus - stylized rendering

=== 1982: The AIDS crisis ===
In 1982, the first news of AIDS reached Switzerland. The first names given to it were "gay cancer", "gay disease", and "gay-related immune deficiency" (GRID). No-one knew at the time what caused AIDS, or how the infection spread. The advent of AIDS changed the movement of the mid-eighties completely. Many of the founders died, and LGBT people were stigmatised, leading to CSDs and gay rights demonstrations becoming sporadic rather than annual.

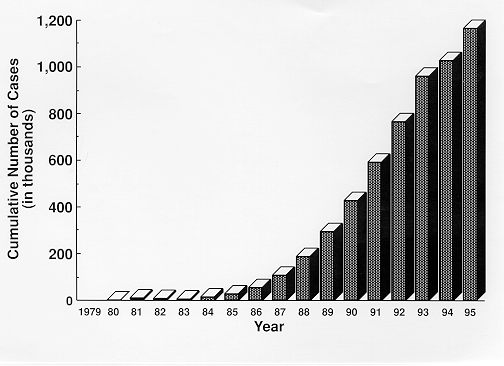
AIDS cases worldwide (1979–1995)

To meet this challenge, the Schwulen Medizinmänner (Gay Medicine Men) group was founded in 1984 (renamed Medi Gay in 1997), and led the first information sessions on HIV and AIDS in the same year, together with HAZ, SOH, and the University Hospital of Zurich.

In 1985, ‘’Loge 70’’, all ‘’HA’’ groups, ‘’SOH’’, and the Federal Health Office (BAG) founded ‘’Aids-Hilfe Schweiz’’ (AHS) (AIDS-Help Switzerland). In 1986, the AHS published an AIDS information brochure, which was distributed to all households in Switzerland. The AHS prevention campaign is the most successful prevention campaign in Switzerland.

CSDs resumed in Zurich in 1986, and in Bern in 1987. The 1987 Bern demonstration was more a protest against the withdrawal of a permit by the city authorities for a gay camp, than a gay pride parade.

In 1988, the culture Kaserne in Basel, there was an exhibition of Men's Stories about Gay Life in Basel, 1930–1980. The population began to perceive LGBT people outside of the subject of AIDS again. The show was such a success that a profit was generated, with which the Stonewall Foundation was founded, which funds the CSD-Stonewall-Award (see below).

In 1989, a Christopher Street Day was held in Zürich with a cultural program to mark the 20th anniversary of the Stonewall riots.

Despite the suffering that HIV and AIDS brought to many people, it also brought a broad understanding of alternative ways of life in Switzerland. Authorities and the gay rights movement worked successfully hand in hand.

=== 1990s ===
==== Pride festivals ====
CSDs have again been held annually in Zürich since the 25-year anniversary of the Stonewall riots in 1994, now with a cultural program. In the 1990s, CSDs were increasingly perceived by the general public in a positive light, and accompanied by positive coverage in the Swiss media. Thus, the attitude of the public to the concerns of gays and lesbians has changed for the positive, ultimately resulting in a gradual increase in equality. This is far more important in Switzerland, with its semi-direct democracy, than in the Federal Republic of Germany with its parliamentary democracy.

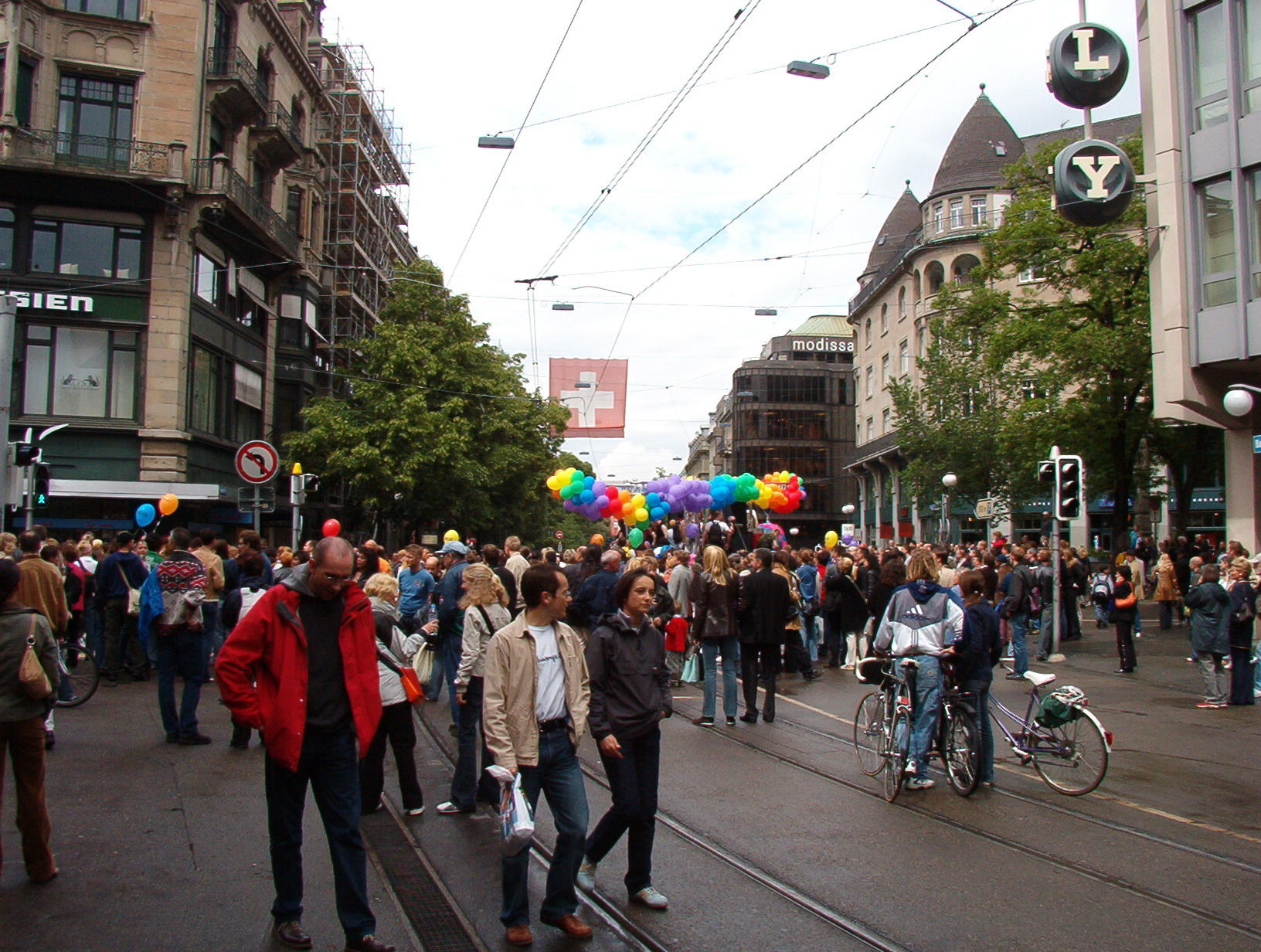
2004 Zürich Pride Festival

Since 1997, the CSD-Stonewall-Award has been awarded annually at the Zürich CSD for outstanding achievement for LGBT rights. Due to the growing numbers of visitors and participants in the CSD in Zurich, it has become an increasingly important festival and a major tourist attraction for the city. After Europride 2009, at the General Assembly in November 2009, the association CSD Zurich renamed itself the Zurich Pride Festival, giving itself a name like similar events around the world. In addition to the Parade and the final rallies, there are four days of street festivals and cultural events with artists, political events, lectures, readings and parties. As a political demonstration, often with a policy-related theme, the CSD shows mostly in the form of demonstration parades and a subsequent rally. Often, the rally is supported by artists with performances on stage. In addition, the political message of the CSD is celebrated there.

Since 1997, in addition to the CSD in Zurich there have been occasional Gay Prides in western Switzerland. It is held in a different part of French-speaking Switzerland every time, following the example of the LGBT demonstrations in the 1980s, which were held in a different part of German-speaking Switzerland every year.

In 2018 for the first time a pride parade was held in Ticino. This year the parade in Lugano acted as both the national and the French-speaking parade.

==== Other events ====
In 1999, Claude Janiak was first elected to the National Council of Switzerland, becoming the first openly gay male member of the federal Parliament.

=== 2000s ===
==== Pride festivals ====
The Gay Pride 2001 in Sion caused a sensation in particular, as the Valais Bishop Norbert Brunner condemned the relocation as a "teuflisches Spiel" ("devilish/satanic/diabolical/fiendish game"), triggering unimagined media coverage.

In 2003 in Basel, a "Dreiländer-CSD" (three-country CSD) was held (Germany - France - Switzerland) together with the Alsace Mulhouse and the Baden Freiburg. The idea, however, fizzled out.

In 2005, a CSDs was held in Lucerne (a Swiss German-speaking venue, as a gift to the West Switzerland vote for the Partnership Act 2005), and there was also a national demonstration. Zurich is the only Swiss city that holds an annual CSD.

==== Other events ====
Claude Janiak was elected as the first openly gay Speaker of the National Council in 2005. He was then elected to the Council of States in 2007, becoming the first openly gay member of that body.

Doris Stump, first elected to the National Council in 2003, was the first lesbian member of the Parliament.

==== Registered partnership and marriage in Switzerland ====
Since 1 January 2007 Switzerland has allowed registered partnerships for same-sex couples.

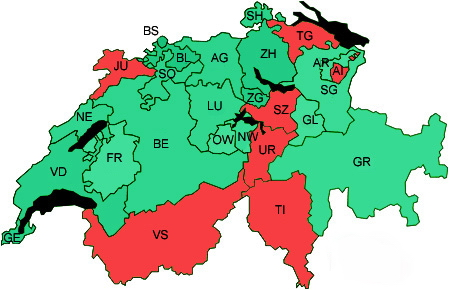
Vote results for partnership law in Switzerland

On 26 September 2021, a clear majority of the Swiss electorate voted in favour of marriage for all. From 1 July 2022, same-sex couples can now marry or convert their registered partnership into a marriage. With this decision, no new registered partnerships can be entered into after 1 July 2022.

== See also ==
- LGBT rights in Switzerland
