= LGBTQ rights in Switzerland =

- Location of Switzerland (green) in Europe (dark grey) – [Legend]
- Legal status: Legal nationwide since 1942; Equal age of consent since 1992
- Gender identity: Authorities do not register gender Change of legal sex is possible
- Military: Gays, lesbians and bisexuals allowed to serve openly Transgender people, who are deemed medically fit, allowed to serve openly
- Discrimination protections: Full protection in interactions with the state Extensive protections in other interactions

Family rights
- Recognition of relationships: Civil union from 2007 to 2022; Same-sex marriage since 2022
- Adoption: Full adoption rights since 2022

Lesbian, gay, bisexual, transgender, and queer (LGBTQ) rights in Switzerland are some of the most comprehensive by world standards. Social attitudes and the legal situation have liberalised at an increasing pace since the 1940s, in parallel to the situation in Europe and the Western world more generally. Legislation providing for same-sex marriage, same-sex adoption, and IVF access was accepted by 64% of voters in a referendum on 26 September 2021, and entered into force on 1 July 2022.

Same-sex sexual acts between adults have been legal in Switzerland since 1942. The age of consent has been the same (at 16, or below if the age difference does not exceed three years) for homosexual and heterosexual sex since a referendum in May 1992. There has been legal recognition for same-sex relationships since 2007, following a referendum in June 2005. A legal procedure for the registration of sex changes following sex reassignment surgery was outlined in 1993, though since 2010, authorities have followed a practice of registration of sex changes without any requirement of surgery. Since January 2022, people can change their legal sex by self-determination. The Swiss Constitution of 1999 (Art. 8) guarantees equal treatment before the law, specifying "way of life" as one of the criteria protected against discrimination. Certain forms of homophobic discrimination have been a criminal offense since a referendum in February 2020.

The largest LGBT rights advocacy groups in Switzerland are Lesbenorganisation Schweiz for lesbian rights (founded in 1989), Pink Cross for LGBT rights (founded in 1993), and Transgender Network Switzerland (founded in 2010). In the 2010s, these groups had increasingly tended to make use of the initialism LGBTI (for "lesbian, gay, bisexual, transgender, intersex") as an umbrella term for their respective areas of interest. Intersex organization Zwischengeschlecht campaigns for intersex rights and bodily autonomy.

== Legality of same-sex sexual activity ==
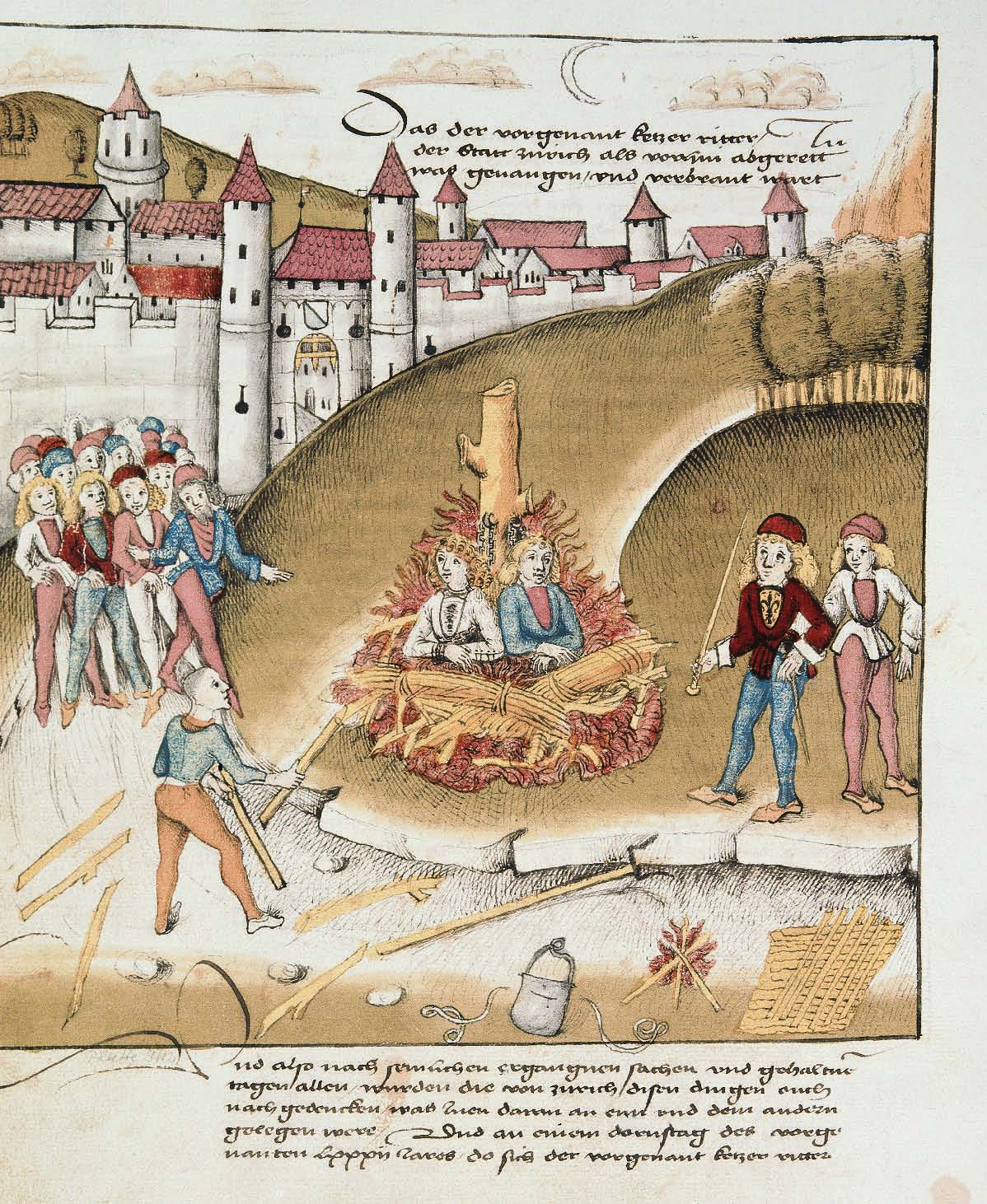
A Swiss knight Sir Richard Puller von Hohenburg and his squire are being punished for their acts of sodomy by being burned at the stake; they look unruffled. Zurich, Switzerland. 1482 (Zurich Central Library)

Same-sex sexual activity was decriminalised nationwide in 1942 with the introduction of a national criminal code. Some cantons had legalized same-sex sexual activity previously. The cantons of Geneva, Ticino, Vaud and Valais had done so in 1798 by adopting the Napoleonic Code.

The higher age of consent for same-sex sexual activity (20 years instead of 16 for heterosexual sexual activity) was repealed by the criminal law reform of 1992. In a national referendum on 17 May 1992, 73% of the voters accepted the reform of Swiss federal legislation on sexual offences, including the elimination of all discrimination against homosexuality from the Penal Code. Article 187 of the Criminal Code states that the general age of consent for sexual activity in Switzerland is 16.

== Recognition of same-sex relationships ==
=== Registered partnerships ===
2005 registered partnerships referendum
- 5 June 2005
- Federal Act on registered partnerships of same-sex couples
- Official results

Results
Choice	Votes	%
Yes	1,559,848	58.04%
No	1,127,520	41.96%

Registered partnerships have been recognized by law (for same-sex couples only) since 1 January 2007, when the Registered Partnership Act came into force. Prior to this, the cantons of Geneva, Fribourg, Neuchâtel and Zürich already allowed registered partnerships. In 2007, one in ten of all unions in Zürich were registered partnerships.

=== Same-sex marriage ===
2021 same-sex marriage referendum
- 26 September 2021
- Amendment to the Swiss Civil Code (Marriage for All)
- Preliminary official results

Results
Choice	Votes	%
Yes	1,828,427	64.10%
No	1,024,167	35.90%

Same-sex marriage was legalized in a referendum on 26 September 2021. 64.1% of voters supported an amendment to the civil code that allowed same-sex marriage, adoption by same-sex couples and assisted reproductive technology for female same-sex couples. The amendment came into force on 1 July 2022.

The amendment originated with a bill by the Green Liberal Party of Switzerland MP Kathrin Bertschy providing for same-sex marriage. On 18 December 2020, the Swiss federal legislature adopted corresponding legislation, which also provides for IVF access for lesbian couples. In Switzerland's system of semi-direct democracy, the statute was subject to a popular referendum if its opponents collected 50,000 signatures demanding one within three months. The right-wing EDU party did so, collecting 61,027 signatures.

=== Religious communities ===
- In June 2019, the Protestant Women of Switzerland announced its support for the introduction of same-sex marriage and assisted reproductive technology for lesbian couples.
- In June 2019, the Swiss Union of Catholic Women also expressed its support for the introduction of same-sex marriage and assisted reproductive technology for lesbian couples.
- In November 2019, the Protestant Church of Switzerland voted in favour of the introduction of civil marriage for same-sex couples.
- In August 2020, the Old Catholic Church in Switzerland voted in favour of performing same-sex marriages in its churches.

== Adoption and parenting ==
Single people, regardless of sexual orientation, may adopt children. A bill permitting stepchild adoption for same-sex couples was approved by Parliament in spring 2016. Opponents unsuccessfully tried to force a referendum on the bill. The law came into effect on 1 January 2018. By late December 2018, about one year after the adoption law had taken effect, about 173 same-sex stepchild adoption applications had been filed. This data does not include the cantons of Luzern, Thurgau, and Zürich. About 22 had been filed in the canton of Geneva and 20 in the city of Lausanne.

Joint adoption was illegal for same-sex couples in Switzerland because it is restricted to heterosexual married couples. The statutory amendment that legalised same-sex marriage permits married same-sex couples to adopt jointly and access IVF treatment went into legal effect from July 1, 2022.

== Discrimination protections ==
=== Anti-discrimination laws ===
==== Constitutional and civil law ====
The Swiss Constitution (Art. 8) guarantees equal treatment before the law, specifying "way of life" as one of the many stated criteria protected against unfair discrimination. Swiss law recognizes a very strong principle of freedom of association and, as such, has only limited provisions to outlaw discrimination in the private sector or between private individuals. Notable exceptions are the Law for Equal Treatment of Men and Women (German: Bundesgesetz über die Gleichstellung von Frau und Mann; French: Loi fédérale sur l'égalité entre femmes et hommes; Italian: Legge federale sulla parità dei sessi; Romansh: Lescha federala davart l'equalitad da dunna ed um) and Article 261bis of the Penal Code outlawing discrimination based on "race, ethnicity, religion or sexual orientation". Because of this situation, private lawsuits against alleged discrimination in recent years have increasingly attempted to invoke the difficult-to-interpret prohibition of "personal injury" (Art. 28a of the Civil Code). Discriminatory termination of employment is protected against if it can be shown that employment was terminated based on "a property to which the other party is entitled by virtue of their personhood, except where that property bears a relation to the nature of the employment contract or significantly affects the work environment". However, there have been very few actual legal proceedings based on lawsuits against alleged discrimination on such grounds. A 2015 survey found seven individual cases, none of which involved alleged discrimination based on sexual orientation or gender identity.

There are also anti-discrimination provisions in the laws and regulations of some cantons and municipalities. For example, in September 2017, the cantonal executive body of Geneva adopted new regulations against discrimination based on sex, sexual orientation and gender identity in the cantonal government. Workplace discrimination against LGBT people is considered to be an ongoing problem in a 2014 report by the Institute of Gender Studies at the University of Geneva and the Federation of LGBT Associations of Geneva.

==== Criminal law ====
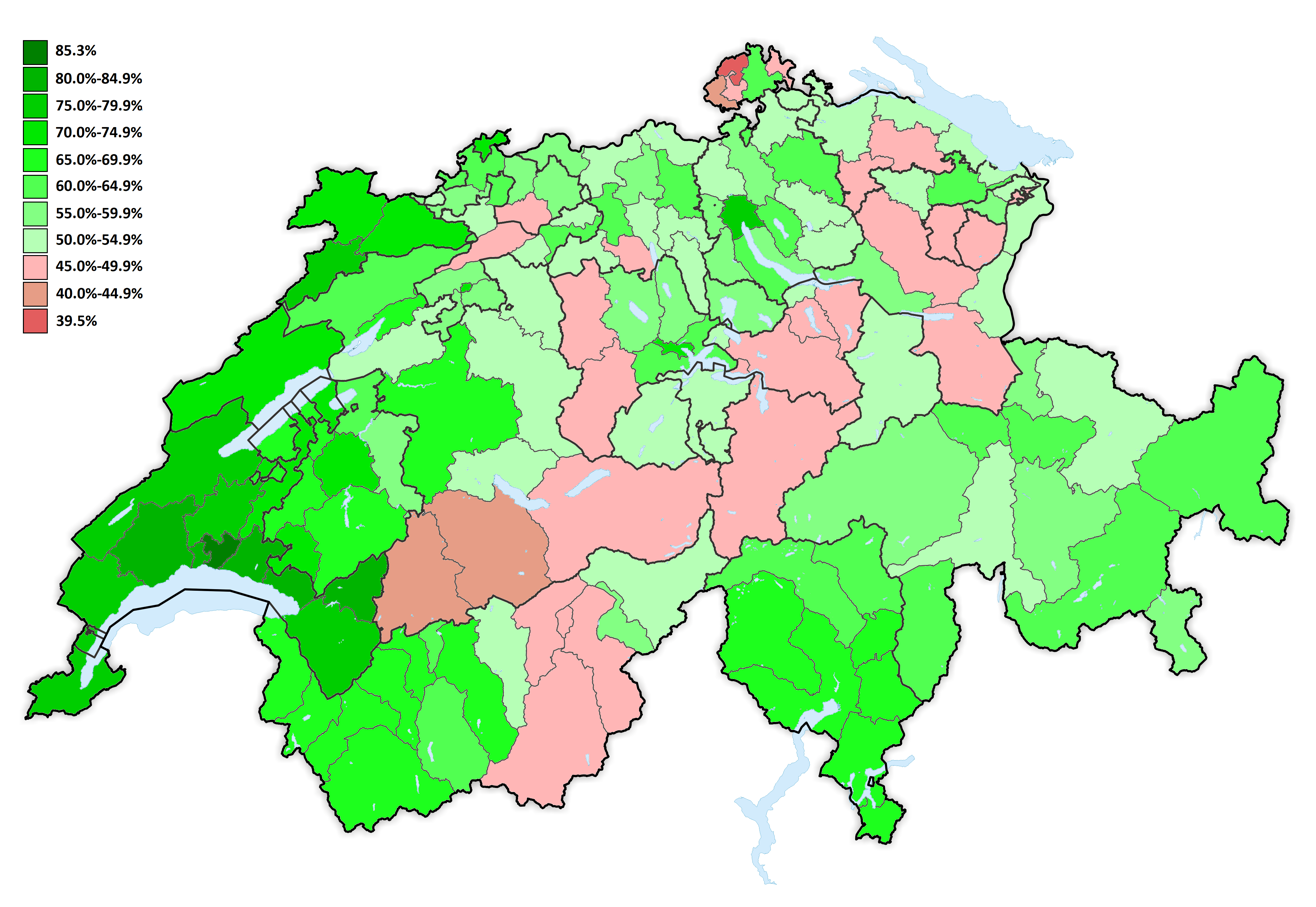
Map showing how the Swiss electorate voted in the February 2020 anti-discrimination referendum, by district

Since February 2020, discrimination because of a person's "sexual orientation" is prohibited by Art. 261^{bis} of the Swiss Criminal Code. This category was added by a 2018 law, adopted by Swiss voters in a referendum on 9 February 2020, to a provision that already prohibited discrimination because of race, ethnic origin or religion. The specific prohibited acts are:

- public incitement to hatred or discrimination,
- the public dissemination of ideologies or propaganda campaigns that have as their object the systematic denigration or defamation of persons,
- public denigration or discrimination of persons in a manner that violates human dignity, or
- refusing to provide a service that is intended to be provided to the general public.

Violations are liable to be punished by a custodial sentence not exceeding three years, or a monetary penalty.

This change in law was initiated in 2013 by Mathias Reynard, an MP of the Social Democratic Party, with a bill to outlaw all "discrimination and incitement of hatred" on the basis of "race, ethnicity, religion or sexual orientation". On 11 March 2015, the National Council voted 103–73 to allow the bill to continue through the legislative process. The Committee of Legal Affairs of the Council of States allowed the bill to proceed on 23 April 2015. In February 2017, the Committee of Legal Affairs of the National Council approved, in a 15–9 vote, an amendment to the bill adding "gender identity" as a prohibited ground of discrimination. The bill was opposed by several members of the Swiss People's Party (SVP/UDC), which regarded it as unnecessary, although the party as a whole chose not to take a position on the bill. The other parties mostly supported the bill, as did 86% of the Swiss people according to polls.

In August 2018, the Federal Council announced its support for the proposal, but recommended that the term gender identity be removed due to its "vagueness". The National Council refused to remove the term, and approved the bill on 25 September 2018, in a 118–60 vote with 5 abstentions. On 7 November 2018, the Legal Affairs Committee of the Council of States approved in a 9 to 2 vote (with 1 abstention) the legal change to make discrimination on the basis of sexual orientation and gender identity illegal. Outlining its decision to also include gender identity, the committee said transgender and intersex people were the victims of discrimination alongside homosexuals and bisexuals. In November 2018, the Council of States approved the bill in a 32–10 vote. However, by 23 votes to 18, it voted to remove the term "gender identity" due to it being "too vague". Many deputies and LGBT organisations welcomed the extension of the law to include sexual orientation, but expressed disappointment that gender identity was excluded, which according to Transgender Network Switzerland "excludes and further marginalises intersex and transgender people. [The law] will only be complete when it condemns discrimination based on gender identity." Because the legal text had been altered, the National Council had to re-vote on it. On 3 December, despite demands from the Social Democrats and the Greens, in a 107–77 vote, it voted to exclude gender identity from the bill. By April 2019, opponents had collected 70,000 signatures to force a referendum on the law. Despite concerns over the validity of the signatures, as several people reportedly signed the initiative believing it to be a campaign against homophobia, a referendum took place on 9 February 2020. Swiss voters approved the law with about 63% voting in favor.

=== Hate crime laws and violence ===
In November 2016, Swiss LGBT groups began offering a helpline to LGBT people.

In August 2017, the Swiss Federal Council expressed opposition to a motion proposed by the Conservative Democratic Party which would force the confederation to count and register hate crimes committed against members of the LGBT community. It argued it would be too difficult to keep track of these crimes, as it is not always clear whether homophobia or transphobia was a factor. In September 2019, the National Council voted in support of the bill (97 approve, 94 oppose), followed by the Council of States rejecting it in March of 2020 (18 approve, 21 oppose), thereby dismissing the motion.

A 2018 survey of 1,700 Neuchâtel school children (14–15-years old) found that 10% of girls and 5% of boys identified as LGBT. Among these, 38% reported receiving slaps, kicks or punches, 25% reported frequent harassment, 16% reported being victim of physical violence and 7% reported being discriminated against by a teacher.

== Military service ==
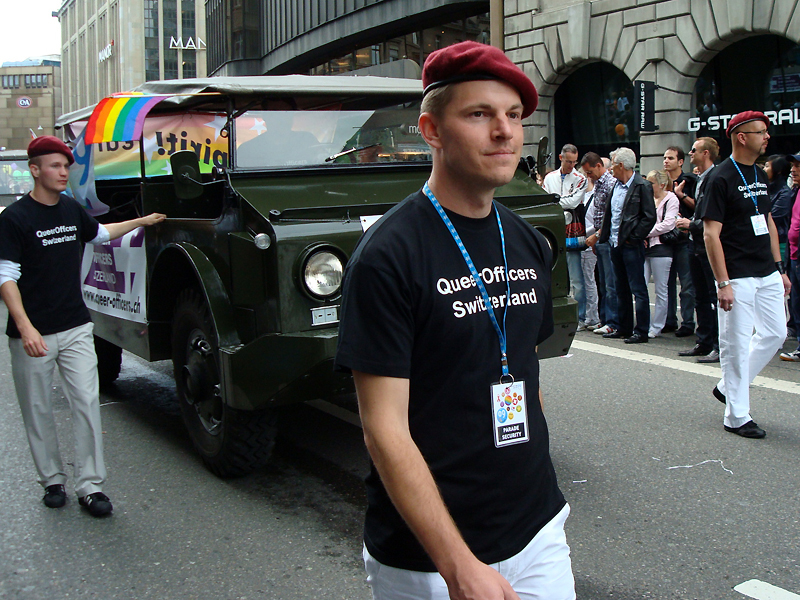
Members of the Swiss Armed Forces marching at an LGBT pride parade

Since 1992, homosexuality and bisexuality are no longer mentioned in the Military Criminal Code (MCC). After a referendum on 17 May 1992, the then Article 127 dealing with unnatural fornication in the military ("Who makes a lewd affair with a person of the same sex will be punished with prison ...") was abolished.

Since 2005, the association QueerOfficers Switzerland has acted as a network for queer members of the armed forces and thus as a representation of the interests of LGBTI members of the armed forces.

Since 2013, some transgender people have been able to serve openly in the Swiss Armed Forces. In that year, the case of a cook whose deployment to KFOR service was initially canceled after she came out as transgender was discussed in a high-profile TV programme. As a result, the Army changed its policy to allow the service of transgender people if a medical examination determines that they are "in good physical and psychical health, sufficiently resistant to stress, resilient and able to be subordinate", and it established a diversity office. Since 2019, the draft form has allowed draftees to indicate their gender identity separately from their legal sex, a change proposed by LGBT rights organizations. However, transsexuality or gender dysphoria remain reasons for dismissal according to Army regulations. Army medical officials said that about 18 draftees were so diagnosed annually. In 2019, a trans man was refused recruitment because of these regulations; but the Chief of the Armed Forces, Philippe Rebord, said that they and the case would be reviewed. In September 2019, Lt Col Christine Hug became the first trans woman to command a battalion.

== Transgender rights ==
On January 1, 2022, a new process to change one's legal sex based on self-determination came into effect in Switzerland. No divorce, surgery, or medical conditions are required. It allows to legally change between the female and male sex. The law refers to sex, and does not mention "gender", "gender identity" or related concepts. Furthermore, the accompanying official message, which outlines the reasoning of the legislative body, states that sex is binary in Swiss law. Neither gender nor gender identity is registered by Swiss authorities.

This situation developed as follows: A 1993 ruling by the Federal Supreme Court (BGE 119 II 264) allows for a legal procedure for the registration of sex changes. In February 2010, in an extension of the scope of the 1993 Federal Supreme Court ruling, the Federal Office for Civil Registration (EAZW/OFEC/UFSC) of the Federal Department of Justice and Police advised cantonal executives to legally recognize sex changes even in the absence of surgery. The EAZW made it explicit, with reference to the principle of separation of powers, that the order is binding only for cantonal executive organs and not for cantonal courts of law. The Federal Office for Civil Registration also stated that a marriage can be converted into a registered partnership, if one of the partners should change their legal sex. In May 2018, the Federal Council proposed altering Swiss legislation to allow individuals to change their registered sex and first name(s) by simply by making a declaration at the civil status registry. On 11 June 2020, the Council of States passed legislation to this effect by 31 votes for, 7 against, and 7 abstentions. It would permit people to change their legal sex without further requirements, such as surgery, medical examinations, et cetera. Minors aged between 12 and 18 would need the consent of a legal guardian to undertake a legal sex change. On 24 September 2020, the National Council passed the legislation by 121 votes for, 61 against, and 13 abstentions and suppressed the consent of a legal guardian by 100 votes for, 93 against, and 2 abstentions. On 2 December 2020, the Council of States approved the bill in its second reading, but introduced a limit of 16 years of age for which the consent of a legal guardian is no longer required. Swiss legal practice until the end of 2021 only allowed persons to change their officially registered sex through judicial proceedings.

In November 2019, the Grand Council of Basel-Stadt voted to include "gender identity" in its law on detention to better protect transgender people in regard to placement in correctional facilities.

In June 2023, the Federal Supreme Court upheld the firing of a teacher by a cantonal school after the teacher refused to call a transgender student by his chosen male first name. The court explained that the school was constitutionally required to protect the student's right to privacy and individual self-determination, including his identity, and that this requirement outweighed the teacher's religious objections.

=== Non-binary people ===
There is no legal recognition of non-binary gender in the country and the Swiss government has decided that it is not mandatory to recognize documents with neutral gender markers issued abroad, although it has expressed concern about the situation.

A Tamedia survey found that 62% of Swiss are against the introduction of a gender-neutral marker in official documents, while around 35-40% are in favour of the change.

== Intersex rights ==
Intersex infants in Switzerland may undergo medical interventions to have their sex characteristics altered. Human rights groups increasingly consider these surgeries unnecessary and, they argue, should only be performed if the applicant consents to the operation. In 2012, the Geneva University Hospitals issued guidelines prohibiting its doctors from performing such procedures without the consent of the applicant.

In 2018, the National Council, the lower house of Parliament, expressed support for an "X" sex descriptor on identity documents, with 107 votes in favour. A separate motion to allow intersex individuals to leave their sex entry blank was also accepted, with 109 votes in favour. The Federal Council will now review the motions and later express recommendations.

In April 2019, the Grand Council of Geneva passed two motions, one unanimously, against the use of such surgeries, which they labelled "mutilation". The motions foresee a reparation scheme and free psychosocial counselling for the victims, as well as the dismissal of any doctor or physician who performs these procedures on intersex people without their consent.

== Blood donation ==
From November 1, 2023, a 4-month deferral period after the last new sexual contact is to be implemented for gay men to donate blood, the same applied to everyone else (down from 1 year since 2017).

In the 1980s, as a result of the HIV/AIDS pandemic, a blanket ban on gay and bisexual men donating blood was enacted. In June 2016, the Swiss Red Cross announced it would address a request to Swissmedic, Switzerland's surveillance authority for medicine and medical devices, and ask for the ban to be lifted. Under the new rules, gay and bisexual men can donate blood and stem cells if they have not had sex in a year. The rules were implemented on 1 July 2017.

In early May 2017, the National Council approved a motion calling on all restrictions on gay and bisexual men donating blood to be lifted. According to the National Council, only risky behaviour should be a factor for blood donation, not one's sexual orientation. The motion, introduced by the Conservative Democrats, was approved 97–89. However, this was rejected by the Council of States on 29 November 2017. The 1 year deferral period for gay and bisexual men donating blood therefore remains in place - until November 1, 2023, when the 4-month deferral period goes into effect.

== Conversion therapy ==
So-called conversion therapies remain unregulated at the federal level, but legislative efforts to ban them are ongoing. Several cantons have banned them by way of cantonal legislation.

=== Federal regulation ===
In 2016, Conservative Democrat MP Rosmarie Quadranti requested the Swiss Federal Government to undertake measures to outlaw conversion therapy on LGBT minors. The Swiss Federal Council wrote in response that in its view, conversion therapies are "ineffective and cause significant suffering to young people subjected to them", and would constitute a breach of professional duties on the part of any care professional undertaking them. As such, in its view, any care professional undertaking such therapies is already liable to be sanctioned by the cantonal authorities, if the cantons make the choice to enforce this rule. Whether such therapies also constitute a criminal offense is to be determined by the criminal courts in individual cases, according to the Federal Council.

On 12 December 2022, the National Council adopted a motion of its legal commission calling for a national ban on "conversion therapies." 143 members of parliament voted in favor, 37 against (most of the Swiss People's Party's representatives), and 11 abstained. The motion remains pending in the Council of States.

In a 2026 government report concerning the necessity of regulating conversion therapies, the Federal Council confirmed that it rejects and condemns such practices, but wrote that current federal health regulations as well as some cantonal regulations already widely protect against conversion therapies. Nonetheless, the government wrote that it was open to further federal regulation if mandated to do so by Parliament in the pending motion.

=== Cantonal regulation ===
Neuchâtel banned conversion therapies in 2023, while the cantons of Valais and Vaud did so in 2024.

When in 2018 a therapist in Geneva claimed to be able to "cure" homosexuality through homoeopathy, he was fired, and the Geneva Ministry of Health opened an investigation because of the therapist's belief that homosexuality is an illness.

== Position of political parties ==
Among the major political parties, the Social Democratic Party (SP/PS), the Green Party (GPS/PES), FDP.The Liberals (FDP/PLR) and the Green Liberal Party (GLP/PVL) are in favour of LGBT rights including same-sex marriage, adoption and access to artificial insemination for lesbian couples, whereas the Swiss People's Party (SVP/UDC) is generally opposed.

Despite its large Catholic and socially conservative base, the Christian Democratic People's Party (CVP/PDC) has become increasingly supportive of same-sex marriage and LGBT rights in recent years. A 2019 survey showed that about 83% of CVP candidates running in the federal election in October were in favour of same-sex marriage. The party supports same-sex marriage and adoption, but opposes access to fertility treatments for lesbian couples.

== Public opinion ==
A 2016 poll commissioned by gay-rights organisation Pink Cross found that 69% of the Swiss population supported same-sex marriage, with 25% opposed and 6% undecided. Divided by political orientation, the poll found support at 94% among Green Party voters, 63% among Christian Democrat voters and 59% among Swiss People's Party voters. According to the same poll, 50% of the Swiss people supported full joint adoption for same-sex couples, while 39% were opposed and 11% were undecided.

A December 2017 Tamedia poll found that 72% of Swiss people supported same-sex marriage, with 25% opposed. 88% of Greens, Social Democrats and Green Liberals, 76% of Liberal voters, 66% of Christian Democrats, and 56% of Swiss People's Party voters expressed support.

A 2017 Pew Research Center poll found support for same-sex marriage among Switzerland's population at 75%, with 24% opposed and 1% undecided.

In February 2020, a poll conducted by the gfs group found that 81% of respondents "strongly" or "somewhat" supported same-sex marriage, 18% were opposed and 1% were undecided.

In November 2020, another poll conducted by the gfs group found that 82% of respondents "strongly" or "somewhat" supported same-sex marriage, 17% were opposed and 1% were undecided, 72% supported adoption and 70% supported assisted reproductive technology for lesbian couples.

== LGBT rights movement in Switzerland ==
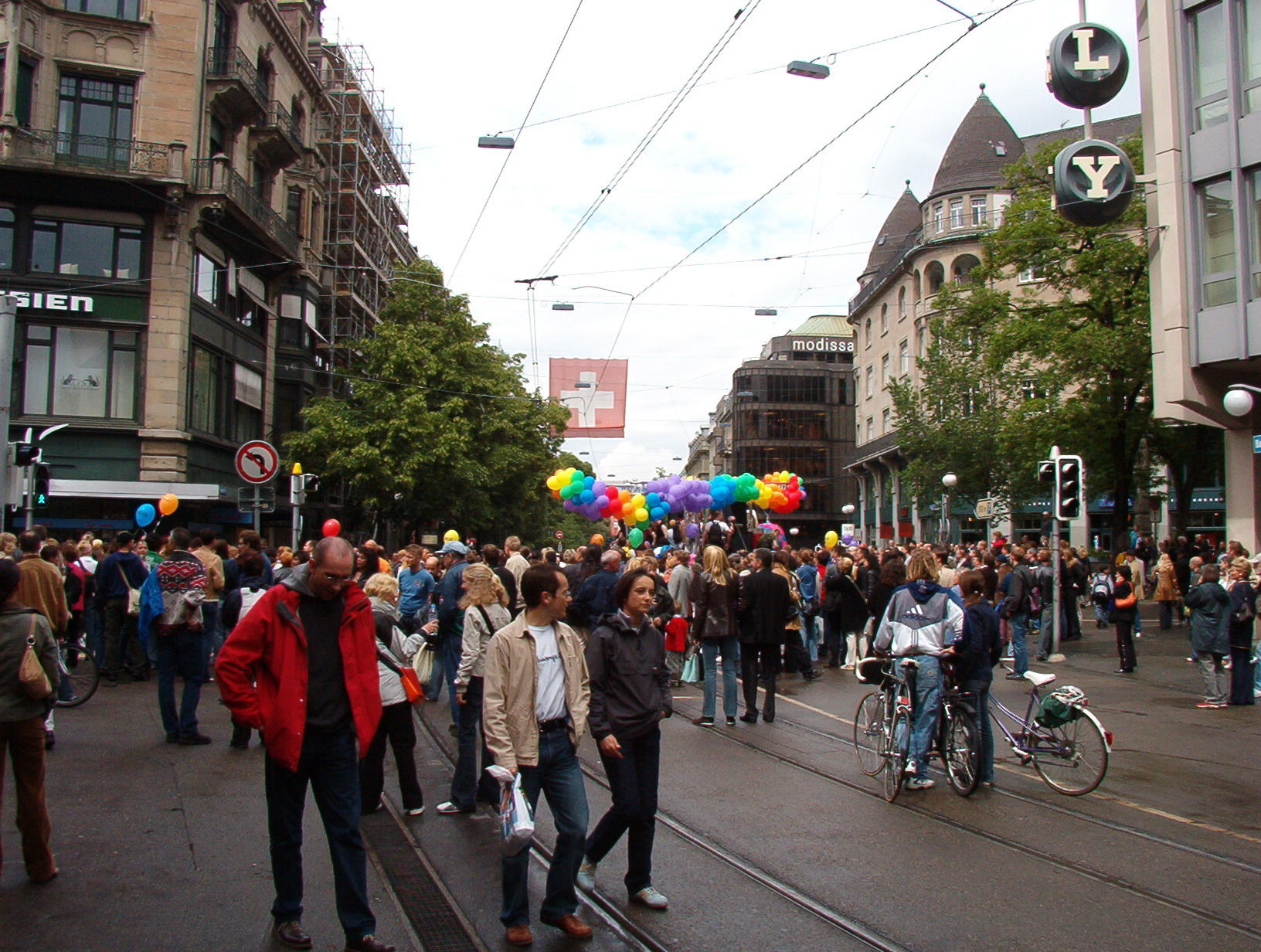
Gay Pride Parade in Zürich in 2004

Since the mid-1990s, an annual Coming Out Day has been held with various publicity events in order to encourage LGBT people to develop a positive relationship with their identity, particularly among young LGBT people. The day is also observed in schools, high schools, universities and other institutions throughout the country, often in the form of seminars, movies, questionnaires, group discussions, etc.

Numerous LGBT organisations operate in Switzerland, on both a national or regional level. The Swiss Lesbian Organisation (Lesbenorganisation Schweiz, Organisation suisse des lesbiennes, Organizzazione svizzera delle lesbiche, Organisaziun svizra da lesbas) was founded in 1989 to advocate for lesbian rights, and Pink Cross was founded in 1993 to campaign for the rights of gay and bisexual men. The groups advocate for visibility, as well as legal rights for same-sex couples and societal acceptance. Pink Cross describes its mission "as represent[ing] gay interests in the realms of politics, administration and public opinion." Transgender Network Switzerland campaigns for the betterment of the transgender community, offering its services to any transgender individual seeking advice on legal sex and name changes, the armed forces or asylum. Other groups include Dialogai, founded in 1982 to offer helplines and advice, Zwischengeschlecht, an intersex association, Queeramnesty, and Rainbow Families (Regenbogenfamilien, Familles arc-en-ciel, Famiglie arcobaleno, Famiglias d'artg). On a cantonal level, there are also several LGBT groups, including Vogay in Vaud, Alpagai in Valais, Homosexuelle Arbeitsgruppen Zürich (HAZ) in Zürich, GayBasel in Basel-Stadt and Imbarco Immediato in Ticino, amongst others. In addition, there are also several LGBT youth groups present at Swiss universities, including at EPFL, ETH Zurich, the University of Lausanne and the University of St. Gallen.

Pride parades are held throughout Switzerland. The largest and oldest such event is held in Zürich, first organised in 1994. In 2019, the event saw the participation of about 50,000 people. In the Romandy, Pride festivals rotate cities every year. The 2019 edition, which was held in Geneva, saw a turnout of 35,000 people. Other cities where such events have been held include Bern, Basel, Lausanne, Fribourg, Sion, Lugano, and Lucerne.

There are several openly LGBT politicians in Switzerland. Among them is Claude Janiak, State Councillor and former National Council President, who is involved in AIDS work and Pink Cross. Mayor of Zürich Corine Mauch is also openly gay.

The "Gay Happiness Index" (GHI) published based on a poll by PlanetRomeo lists Switzerland at rank nine with a GHI score of 70.

In 2017, the rights group Rainbow Europe ranked Switzerland three places lower after delay in updating its anti-discrimination laws to explicitly include gender identity and sexual orientation.

In 2018, a Chur bishop drew controversy after claiming that 90% of victims of child sex abuse and paedophilia in the Roman Catholic Church were of "a homosexual tendency".

In February 2020, the Swiss population voted, with 63.1% in favour, to extend the country's hate speech law to cover sexual orientation, thus making public incitement to hatred on account of sexual orientation a criminal offence. The results of the referendum varied significantly by linguistic region; whereas 75.3% of French-speaking Switzerland and 66.5% of Italian-speaking Switzerland supported the proposal, only 59.0% of German-speaking Switzerland did so. For instance, while the small French-speaking town of Rougemont voted 70.1% in support, the neighbouring German-speaking town of Saanen voted 55.7% against. The highest "yes" vote was recorded in the canton of Vaud, which voted 80.2% in favour (with its capital city, Lausanne, supporting the proposal at 86.3%). The town of Chigny recorded the highest "yes" vote of any town in the country, at 89.4%. Another distinction in the results were urban and rural areas; support was 73.7% in urban areas (79.6% in the French-speaking parts, 72.5% in the German-speaking parts and 68.5% in the Italian-speaking parts), while it was 54.8% in rural areas (70.6% in the French-speaking parts, 64.6% in the Italian-speaking parts and 48.6% in the German-speaking parts).

== Summary table ==
Same-sex sexual activity legal	Yes (Since 1942, nationwide)
Equal age of consent (16)	Yes (Since 1992)
Anti-discrimination laws concerning sexual orientation in employment	No
Anti-discrimination laws concerning sexual orientation in the provision of goods and services	Yes (Since 2020)
Anti-discrimination laws concerning sexual orientation in all other areas (incl. indirect discrimination, hate speech)	Yes (Since 2020)
Anti-discrimination laws concerning gender expression	No / Yes (In 2023, the Federal Supreme Court ruled this to be implicitly protected by existing law in many situations.)
Same-sex marriages	Yes (Since 2022)
Nationwide recognition of same-sex couples	Yes (Since 2007)
Adoption by a single LGBT person	Yes (Since 1942)
Stepchild adoption by same-sex couples	Yes (Since 2018)
Joint adoption by same-sex couples	Yes (Since 2022)
Gays, lesbians, bisexuals and transgender people allowed to serve openly in the military	Yes (Since 1992)
Right to change legal sex	Yes (Since 1993)
Surgery not required for change of legal sex	Yes (Since 2010)
Self-determination of legal sex	Yes (Since 2022)
Access to IVF for lesbian couples	Yes (Since 2022)
Conversion therapy banned	No / Yes (In the cantons of Neuchâtel, Valais and Vaud)
Commercial surrogacy for gay male couples	No (Banned for heterosexual couples as well)
MSMs allowed to donate blood	Yes (A 4-month deferral period implemented since 2023)

== See also ==
- Human rights in Switzerland
- Intersex rights in Switzerland
- LGBTQ history in Switzerland
- LGBTQ rights in Europe
