= Doris Stump =

Swiss German and English scholar, teacher, publisher and politician

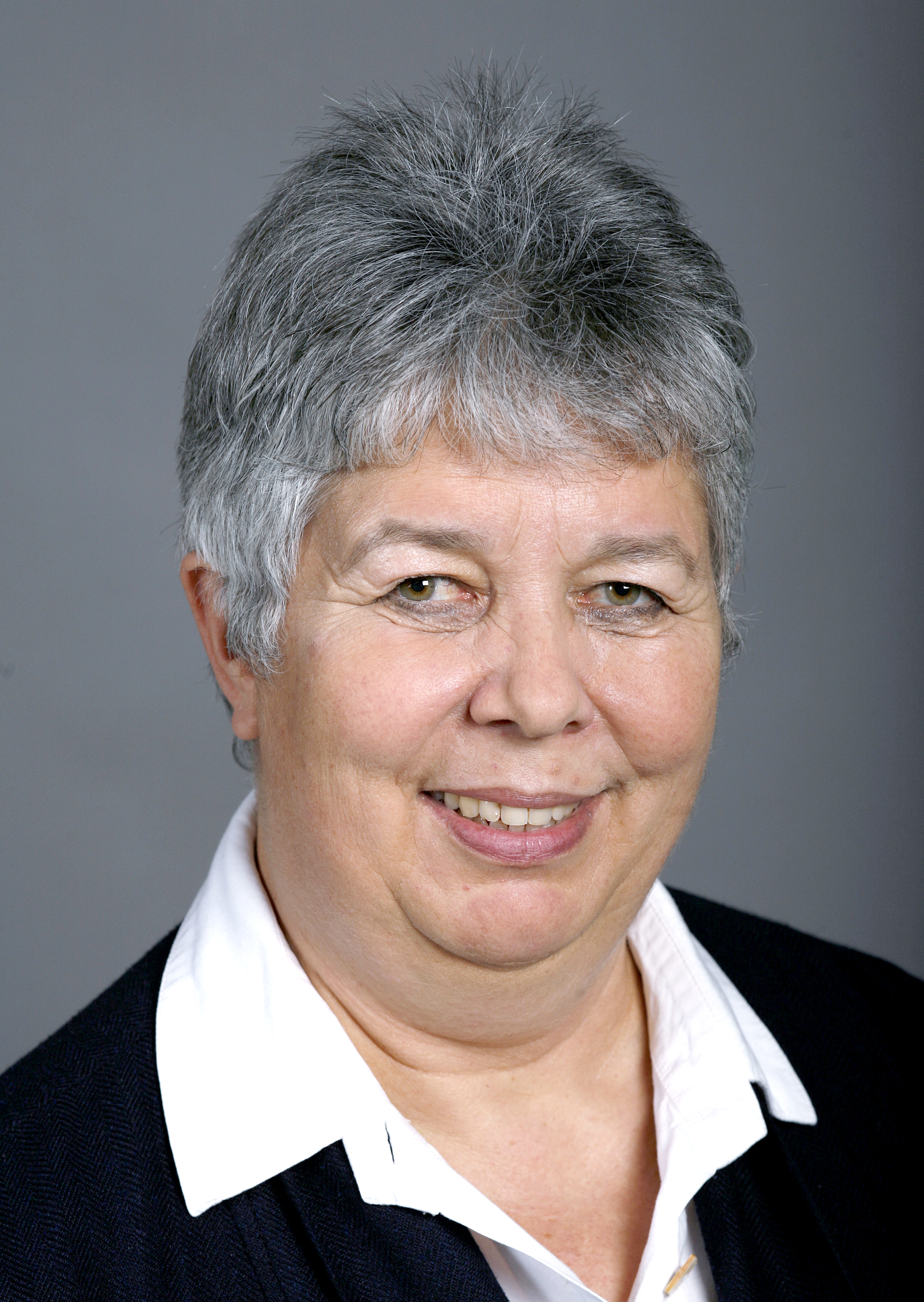

Personal details
- Born: February 6, 1950 (age 76)
- Died: Zürich, Switzerland
- Party: SP
- Education: University of Zurich
- Occupation: Scholar, teacher, publisher and politician

Doris Stump (born February 6, 1950, in Zurich, Switzerland) is a Swiss German and English scholar, teacher, publisher and politician, member of the Social Democratic Party of Switzerland (SP).

== Biography ==
After graduating from high school, she studied German and English at the University of Zurich and Bryn Mawr College in Pennsylvania from 1970 to 1977. In 1984, she completed her doctorate on the Swiss women's rights campaigner and writer Meta von Salis. Between 1978 and 1991, Stump worked as a teacher of German and English at district and cantonal schools in Aargau, including the grammar school in Wettingen. She played a key role in the Swiss National Science Foundation project on Swiss women writers from 1700 to 1945 and helped design the exhibition "Und schrieb und schrieb wie ein Tiger aus dem Busch". Since 2001 has headed the eFeF publishing house, which was founded in 1988. As a publisher, she is committed to the publication of the results of gender research. She calls for the institutionalization of women's and gender studies at Swiss universities and the implementation of the findings of this research in all areas of our society, especially in education and law.

=== Political career ===
Doris Stump was a local councillor in Wettingen from June 1987 to December 1989, then a municipal councillor until 2005.

From the Swiss parliamentary elections in 1995, she was a member of the National Council, where she was a member of the Commission for the Environment, Spatial Planning and Energy, the delegation to the Council of Europe and the delegation to the Inter-Parliamentary Union. In the Council of Europe, she was responsible for two reports on stereotypical portrayals of women and men in the media and on prenatal sex selection in Europe. She calls for action against the deliberate killing of female fetuses. She did not stand as a candidate in the 2011 parliamentary elections.

From May 2010 to April 2015, she served as President of Aargauer Spitex and was therefore jointly responsible for the implementation of care funding and the implementation of the education concept. Stump also chaired Spitex in her home town of Wettingen, which expanded its radius to include the municipality of Neuenhof in 2013.

== Publications ==
- Stump, Doris (1986). Sie töten uns, nicht unsere Ideen: Meta von Salis-Marschlins, 1855-1929, Schweizer Schriftstellerin und Frauenrechtskämpferin (in German). Paeda Media Genossenschaftsverlag. ISBN 978-3-7241-0040-9
- Salis-Marschlins, Meta von (1988). Die unerwünschte Weiblichkeit: Autobiographie, Gedichte, feministische Schriften (in German). Paeda Media Genossenschaftsverlag. ISBN 978-3-7241-0041-6
- Stump, Doris (1994). Deutschsprachige Schriftstellerinnen in der Schweiz, 1700-1945: eine Bibliographie (in German). Limmat-Verlag. ISBN 978-3-85791-214-6
